= List of South Korean films by year =

This is a list of films by year produced in the country of South Korea which came into existence officially in September 1948. The lists of Korean films are divided by period for political reasons. For earlier films of united Korea see List of Korean films of 1919–1948. For the films of North Korea (September 1948 to present) see List of North Korean films. For an A-Z list of films see Category:Korean films.

== 1948–1959 ==
- List of South Korean films of 1948–1959
- 1948
- 1949
- 1950
- 1951
- 1952
- 1953
- 1954
- 1955
- 1956
- 1957
- 1958
- 1959

== 1960–1999 ==
- 1960
- 1961
- 1962
- 1963
- 1964
- 1965
- 1966
- 1967
- 1968
- 1969
- 1970
- 1971
- 1972
- 1973
- 1974
- 1975
- 1976
- 1977
- 1978
- 1979
- 1980
- 1981
- 1982
- 1983
- 1984
- 1985
- 1986
- 1987
- 1988
- 1989
- 1990
- 1991
- 1992
- 1993
- 1994
- 1995
- 1996
- 1997
- 1998
- 1999

== 21st century ==
- 2000
- 2001
- 2002
- 2003
- 2004
- 2005
- 2006
- 2007
- 2008
- 2009
- 2010
- 2011
- 2012
- 2013
- 2014
- 2015
- 2016
- 2017
- 2018
- 2019
- 2020
- 2021
- 2022
- 2023
- 2024
- 2025
- 2026

== Sources ==
- Lee, Young-il (1988). The History of Korean Cinema. Motion Picture Promotion Corporation. ISBN 89-88095-12-X.
- Paquet, Darcy. "Koreanfilm.org".
- South Korean film at the Internet Movie Database
- Korean Movie Database
