= Kim Ji-mee =

South Korean actress and film producer (1940–2025)

- Portrait of Kim
- Born: July 15, 1940; Daejeon, Korea, Empire of Japan
- Died: December 9, 2025 (aged 85); Los Angeles, California, U.S.
- Occupation: Actress
- Years active: 1957–2000

Korean name
- Hangul: 김명자
- Hanja: 金明子
- RR: Gim Myeongja
- MR: Kim Myŏngja

Stage name
- Hangul: 김지미
- Hanja: 金芝美
- RR: Gim Jimi
- MR: Kim Chimi

Kim Ji-mee (Korean: 김지미; July 15, 1940 – December 9, 2025) was a South Korean actress, producer and film planner whose career began in 1957.

== Life and career ==
Kim was born in Daedeok, Chungcheongnam-do, Korea, Empire of Japan on July 15, 1940. While a student of Deokseong Girls' High School, Kim was cast to Kim Ki-young's film, Hwanghon yeolcha (황혼열차) in 1957. Kim was commonly dubbed "Elizabeth Taylor of Korea" by the South Korean news media for her resemblance to the American actress' appearance and popularity as well as her many marriages and divorces.

Kim died in Los Angeles on December 9, 2025, at the age of 85, after her health declined from complications of shingles. She was posthumously awarded the Golden Order of Cultural Merit by the South Korean government.

== Filmography ==
*Note; the whole list is referenced.

Year	English title	Korean title	Romanization	Role	Director
1992	Myong-ja Akiko Sonia		Myeongja Akkikko Ssonya		
1989	In the Name of Memory		Chueok-ui ireumeuro		
1989	All For You		A-Kkimeobsi juryeonda		
1988	America, America		Amaerica, Amaerica		
1986	Ticket		Tiket		
1985	Kilsodeum		Gilsotteum		
1983	A Woman's Outing		Woechul		
1982	Hwa-nyuh of '82		Hwanyeo '82		
1979	Eul-hwa		Eulhwa		
1975	The 49th Day After Death		49je		
1975	Wasteland		Hwangto		
1975	Promise		Yugche-ui yagsog		
1974	A Life		Ilsaeng		
1974	The Earth		Toji		
1973	Farewell		Ibyeol		
1973	Leaving Myeong Dong		Myeongdong-eul tteonamyeonseo		
1972	Non Gae, The Kisaeng		Nongae		
1972	Life is on the Lonely Road		Insaeng-eun nageunegil		
1972	My Love of the South and the North		Namgwa bug-ui dangsin		
1972	A Judge's Wife		Pansabu-in		
1972	A Man Between Walls		Byeogsog-ui namja		
1972	Please Be Happy, My Daughters		Jalsal-ada-o nae ttaldeul-a		
1972	My Beloved Sons and Daughters		Salanghaneun adeulttal-a		
1972	An Idle Love Affair		Buljangnan		
1972	Farewell		Jagbyeol		
1972	Two Sons Crying For Their Mother's Love		Mojeong-e uneun du-adeul		
1972	The Wedding Ring		Gyeolhonbanji		
1972	A Woman in a Mud Flat		Gaesbeolsog-ui yeoja		
1972	Don't Cry My Daughter		Naettal-a uljimala		
1971	I		Na		
1971	A Second Mother		Duljjae-eomeoni		
1971	Cell-mates		Dongchangsaeng		
1971	Whirl of Betrayals on Myeongdong		Myeongdongsamgugji		
1971	A Woman Who Left Home		Jib-eul na-on yeoja		
1971	Lee Sun-sin, The Great General		Seong-ung I Lee Sunsin		
1971	Bachelor in Trouble		Malsseongnan chonggag		
1971	The Alimony		Wijalyo		
1971	It Can't Be Tears		Amado bismul-igessji		
1971	I Miss You Forever		Mos-ij-eul dangsin		
1971	A Bout in 30 Years		30nyeonman-ui daegyeol		
1971	Before Too Late		Neujgi jeon-e		
1971	I Love You To The Death		Jugdolog salanghassnola		
1971	Time on Myeongdong		Myeongdong-e heuleuneun se-wol		
1971	A Nurse		Yumo		
1971	Man Shouldn't Cry		Sana-iga wae ul-eo		
1971	When We Meet Again		Mannabwado jigeum-eun		
1971	The Tiger in Tokyo		Donggyeong-ui holang-i		
1971	Two Weeping Women		Heuneukkineun du yeo-in		
1971	Quit Your life		Ingansapyoleul sseola		
1971	Action Episodes		Hwalgeugdaesa		
1971	What Happened That Night		Geunalbam saenggin il		
1971	Please, Leave When I Sleep		Jamdeulmyeon tteonaju-o		
1971	Beautiful Korea		Aleumda-un paldogangsan		
1970	Tokyo Lion and Myeongdong Tiger		Donggyeongsaja-wa Myeongdongholang-i		
1970	First Experience		Cheosgyeongheom		
1970	Yes, I'll Marry		Sijib-eun ga-yajyo		
1970	I Will Bear No More		Naneun cham-eul su eobsda		
1970	Bakdal Ridge of Tears		Nunmul-ui Bagdaljae		
1970	With or Without Love		Yujeongmujeong		
1970	Pagoda of No Shadow		Mu-yeongtab		
1970	The Night		Bam		
1970	A Woman with No Shadow		Geulimja eobsneun yeoja		
1970	Wailing Love		Salang-a naneun tonggoghanda		
1970	Night of No Return		Dol-a-oji anhneun bam		
1970	Wang and Pak on Myeongdong Street		Myeongdong-ui Wanggwa Bak		
1970	Lady Customer Without a Face		Eolgul-eobsneun yeojasonnim		
1970	Jang, the Knife		Naipeu Jang		
1970	I'll Say Goodbye		Seulpeodo tteonajuma		
1970	Angel, Put Your Clothes on		Cheonsa-yeo os-eul ib-eola		
1970	Tearful Separation at Busan Harbor		Nunmuljeoj-eun Busanhang		
1970	Count of Myeongdong		Myeongdongbaegjag		
1970	The Naked Sun		Beolgeobeoseun Taeyang		
1970	The House of Two Women		Du yeo-in-ui jib		
1970	What's the Use of Crying		Ulgineun wae ul-eo		
1970	Night of Tokyo		Donggyeong-ui bamhaneul		
1970	Heartless on Harbor		Hanggumujeong		
1970	Wang-geon, the Great		Taejo Wang Geon		
1970	Return of the Condemned		Dol-a-on sahyeongsu		
1970	When We Share Pain Together		Neo-wa naega apeum-eul gat-i haess-eul ttae		
1970	A Sword Under the Moon		Wolha-ui geom		
1970	A Seaman in Hong Kong		Hongkong-ui madoloseu		
1970	A Cameilla Blossoms and Falls		Dongbaegkkoch pigojigo		
1970	A Wanderer in Shanghai		Sanghae-ui banglangja		
1970	An Idiot Judge		Hopipansa		
1970	Secret Woman		Sumgyeonon yeoja		
1970	Sad Palace Court		Bijeon		
1970	Eight Daughters-in-law		Paldomyeoneuli		
1969	Madam Freedom		Jayu Buin		
1969	Jealousy and Murder		Charari Nam-iramyeon		
1969	Len's Sonata		Len-ui Aega		
1969	Mrs. Wonnim		Wonnimdaeg		
1969	Women of Yi-Dynasty		Ijo Yeoin Janhogsa		
1969	Rock of Crown Prince		Taejabawi		
1969	The Third Zone		Jesamjidae		
1969	Devotion		Hanmogsum Dabachyeo		
1969	Destiny of My Load		Jeonha Eodiro Gasinaikka		
1969	The Sisters		Idaero Gandahaedo		
1969	Jang Nok-su		Yohwa Jang Nok-su		
1969	Confess of Woman		Yeojaga Gobaeghal Ttae		
1969	Woman Captain		Yeoseonjang		
1969	Lost Love in the Mist		Angaesoge Gabeolin Sarang		
1969	Temporary Government in Shanghai		Sanghae Imsi Jeongbu Wa Kim Gu Seonsaeng		
1969	Three Musketeers in Myeong-dong		Myeong-dong Samchongsa		
1969	Your Name is Women		Neo-ui Ireum-eun Yeoja		
1969	Winter Woman		Gyeoul Buin		
1969	Hwang Jin-yi's First Love		Hwang Jini-ui Cheot-sarang		
1969	A Plateau		Gowon		
1969	Barber of Jangmaru Village		Jangmaruchon-ui Ibalsa		
1969	Let Me Free		Idaeto Tteonage Hae Juseyo		
1969	A Train to Beijing		Bukgyeong Yeolcha		
1969	Evil Person		Main		
1969	Kkotnae		Kkotnae		
1969	Lost Love		Eoneu Haneul Araeseo		
1969	Sky and Star		Haneul-eul Bogo Byeol-eul Ttago		
1969	Rejected First Love		Amuri Mi-wodo		
1969	Until That Day		Neujeodo Geunalkkaji		
1969	Catching Tigers		Sane Gaya Beomeul Japji		
1969	Wound		Sangcheo		
1969	Bring Back the Night Once More		Geu Bamiyeo Dasi Hanbeon		
1969	Cruel Youth		Janhokan Cheongchun		
1968	The Geisha of Korea		Paldo Gisaeng		
1968	A Child of Winds and Clouds		Pung-una		
1968	Vega		Jiknyeoseong		
1968	Returned Left-handed Man		Doraon Oensonjabi		
1968	Sweetheart		Jeongdeun nim		
1968	Cloisonne Ring		Chilbo Banji		
1968	Solitude		Godokan Sungan		
1968	Lady in Dream		Mongnyeo		
1968	A Male Housekeeper		Namja Singmo		
1968	Dark Flower		Heukhwa		
1968	The Mother's Diary		Eomma-ui Ilgi		
1968	The King of a Rock Cave		Amgul Wang		
1968	Journey into the Heart		Maeumui Yeoro		
1968	Herb of Longing		Sangsacho		
1968	Five Assassins		Oin-ui jagaek		
1968	Prince Daewon		Dae-wongun		
1968	Don't Leave Behind Your Love		Jeong Dugo Gajima		
1968	Three-thousand Miles of Legend		Jeonseol-ddara Samcheon-ri		
1968	Without Despair		Jeolmang-eun Eopda		
1968	A Solar Eclipse		Ilsik		
1968	The Eternal Motherhood				
1968	Older Woman		Yeonsang-ui Yeoin		
1968	Bell of Emile		Emile Jong		
1968	Pure Love		Sunjeongsanha		
1968	Desire		Galmang		
1968	White Bear		Hayan Gom		
1968	The Third Zone		Jesam jidae		
1968	Going Well		Jal Doegamnida		
1968	Feeling of Love		Aesim		
1968	Mother Gisaeng		Eeomma Gisaeng		
1968	Chorus of Trees		Galosu-ui Hapchang		
1968	Love		Sarang		
1968	Woman		Yeo		
1968	Until the Day Come Around		Geunari Olttaekkaji		
1968	Stars in My Heart		Byeora Nae Gaseume		
1967	A Secret Room		Milsil		
1967	Waves		Pado		
1967	Why a Cuckoo Cries		Dugyeonsae Uneun Sayeon		
1967	Female Power		Chimabaram		
1967	Four Sisters		Nejamae		
1967	The Body's Destination		Yugcheui Gil, The Way of All Flesh		
1967	A Queen Wasp		Yeowangbeol		
1967	Regret		Huhoe		
1967	When Bucketwheet Flowers Blossom		Memilkkot Pil Muryeop		
1967	Dongsimcho		Dongsimcho		
1967	Longing in Every Heart		Geuriumeun Gaseummada		
1967	Tourist Train		Gwan-gwang Yeolcha		
1967	Farewell		Gobyeol		
1967	Children in the Firing Range		Sagyeokjang-ui Aideul		
1967	I Am Not Lonely		Oeropji Anta		
1967	Step-mother		Gyemo		
1967	A Heavenly Peach Flower		Cheondohwa		
1967	Mrs. Seoul		Seoul Ajumma		
1967	History of the Three States		Pung-un Samgukji		
1967	A Deviation		Talseon		
1967	Chun-hui		Chunhui		
1967	An Angry Calf		Seongnan Songaji		
1967	Seoul is Full		Seoureun Manwonida		
1967	A Grief		Aesu		
1967	A Miracle of Gratitude		Bo-eunui Gijeok		
1967	Nostalgia		Manghyang Cheolli		
1967	Soil		Heuk		
1967	The White Crow		Hayan Kkamagwi		
1967	The Freezing Point		Bingjeom		
1966	A Lucky Adventurer		Daejiui Punguna		
1966	Pyeongyang Gisaeng		Pyeongyang Gisaeng		
1966	What Misunderstanding Left Behind		Ohaega Namgin Geot		
1966	Yeomchungyo		Ulmyeo Hejin Yeomchungyo		
1966	A Student Boarder		Hasuksaeng		
1966	Hun's		Dongdaemun Sijang Huni Eomma		
1966	10 Years of Tragedy		Biryeonsimnyeon		
1966	Eyes of Gold		Hwanggeumeu Nun		
1966	Nilliri		Nilliri		
1966	Buy My Fist		Nae Jumeogeul Sara		
1966	Na Un-gyu		Naungyu Ilsaeng		
1966	Flower Palanquin		Ggockgama		
1966	Wanna Be with You		Geudae Yeope Garyeonda		
1966	Thousand Miles Between the South and the North		Nambukcheonri		
1966	Villains Era		Aginsidae		
1966	Red Ants		Bulgaemi		
1966	How's Your Wife?		Daegui Buineun Eoddeosimnigga		
1966	Decorations Never Rust		Hunjangeun Nokseulji Anneunda		
1966	Tarantula		Dokgeomi		
1966	A Salt Peddler		Sogeum Jangsu		
1966	Prosecutor Min and a Female Teacher		Min Geomsa-wa Yeo-seonsang		
1966	Love, Give Me a Miracle		Saranga Gijeogeul Dao		
1966	River of Farewell		Ibyeol-eui Gang		
1966	Seok's Mother		Hanmanheun Seok-i Eomma		
1966	The Loser and The Winner		Ireun Jawa Chajeun Ja		
1966	Enchantress Bae Jeong-ja		Yohwa Bae Jeong-ja		
1966	Bitter Daedong River		Hanmaneun Daedonggang		
1966	Dongjakdong Mom		Dongjakdong Eomeoni		
1966	Obokmun		Obokmun		
1966	The Last Empress		Majimak Hwanghu Yunbi		
1966	A Black Design Scarf		Geomeun munui-ui mahura		
1966	An Island Girl		Seomsaeksi		
1966	Offsprings		Jasikdeul		
1965	55 Street Shanghai		Sanghai Osip-obeonji		
1965	Blood-soaked Mountain Guwol		Pi-eorin Gu-wolsan		
1965	Lee Seong-gye King Taejo		Taejo Lee Seonggye		
1965	The Married Daughter		Chulga-oe-in		
1965	Pay for My Youth		Cheongchun-eul Byeonsanghara		
1965	The Third Doom		Jesam-ui Unmyeong		
1965	The Castle of Chastity		Jeongjoseong		
1965	The Nobleman at Jeong-dong		Jeongdongdaegam		
1965	Lee Su-il and Shim Sun-ae		I Suilgwa Sim Sunae		
1965	To the End of the World		I sesang Kkeutkkaji		
1965	The King and the Servant Boy		Wanggwa Sangno		
1965	Ok-i's Mom		Ogi Eomma		
1965	Even Mountains and Streams Cried, Too		Sancheondoul-eotda		
1965	You've Got to Live				
1965	Wind, Please Tell Me		Baram-a Malhara		
1965	The Secret Meeting		Milhoe		
1965	The Fugitive		Domangja		
1965	The Foster Mother & the Natural Mother				
1965	The Ruler of the Unnamed Street		Mumyeongga-ui Jibaeja		
1965	The Lady of Honor		Jeonggyeong Bu-in		
1965	Never Regret		Huhoehaji Angetda		
1965	Don't Cry, Hong-do		Hongdo-ya Ulji Mara		
1965	The Cash Is Mine		Hyeongeum-eun Nae Geot-ida		
1965	The Last Passion		Majimak Jeong-yeol		
1965	The Night of Sadness		Aesu-ui Bam		
1965	Missing You to Death		Jukdorok Bogo Sip-eo		
1965	The Tiger Moth		Bulnabi		
1965	The Night Street of the Vagabond		Nageune Bamgeori		
1964	The Heartbreaking Love of Mother		Pi-eorin Mojeong		
1964	The Chaser		Chugyeokja		
1964	The Opium War		Apyeong Jeonjaeng		
1964	The Intimidator		Hyeopbakja		
1964	The Sorrowful Separation		Ibyeolman-eun Seulpeudeora		
1964	The Yangtze River		Yangjagang		
1964	The Night When Raining over the Acacia		Akasi-a-e Bi-oneun Bam		
1964	The Smile in Grief		Seulpeun Miso		
1964	The Saja Castle		Saja Seong		
1964	When Love Makes an Echo		Sarangi Mearichimyeon		
1964	Princess Snow White		Baekseolgongju		
1964	Let's Meet on Thursday		Mogyoire Mannapsida		
1964	The Korean Instrument with 12 Strings		Ga-yageum		
1964	General Nami		Nami Janggun		
1964	The Invisible Border Line		Guggyeong-anin Gukgyeongseon		
1964	Sakyamuni Buddha		Seokgamoni		
1964	The Housemaid		Singmo		
1964	I Sacrifice myself Silently		Maleopssi Bachiryeonda		
1964	The Teacher with Ten Daughters		Sipjamae Seonsaeng		
1964	The Thirsty Youth		Cheongchuneun Mongmareuda		
1963	A Winter Vagabond		Gyeo-ul Nageune		
1963	The Long Nakdong River		Nakdonggang Chilbaengri		
1963	Golden Grass of Yesterday		Yennare Geumjandi		
1963	The Loneliest Man in Seoul		Seo-ulseo Je-il Sseulsseulhan Sanai		
1963	The Only Son		Oe-adeul		
1963	Gaya's House		Gaya-ui Jib		
1963	Stars on the Earth		Daeji-ui Seongjwa		
1963	To Part at Busan Harbor in Tears		Ulmyeo He-eojin Busanhang		
1963	A Beggar Prince		Geoji Wangja		
1963	When Black Flowers Fade		Geomeun Kkonnipi Jilttae		
1963	China Town		Chaina Taun		
1963	Kinship		Hyeolmaek		
1963	No. 77 Miss Kim		Chisipchilbeon Miss Kim		
1963	Jimmy Is Not Sad		Jimmyneun Seulpeuji Anta		
1963	The Fiancee		Yakhonnyeo		
1963	The Virgin in the Pub		Seonsuljib Cheonyeo		
1963	The Masked Prince		Bongmyeondaegun		
1963	Love and Good-bye		Mannal Ttaewa He-eojil Ttae		
1963	Even Dandelions Bloom in Spring		Mindeullekkotdobom-imyeon Pinda		
1963	Prince Sun and Princess Moon		Haennim Wangjawa Dalnim Gongju		
1962	Lee Chadon		Lee Chadon		
1962	A Log Bridge		Oenamudari		
1962	Qin Shu Huangdi and the Great Wall of China		Jinsihwangje-wa Mallijangseong		
1962	Donghak Revolution		Donghak Nan		
1962	Want to Go Somewhere		Eodinji Gago Sipeo		
1962	Yang Kuei-Fei		Yang Gwibi		
1962	Leaving the Fatherland		Dugo-on Sanha		
1962	Great Monk Wonhyo		Wonhyo Daesa		
1962	Sad Miari Pass		Hanmaneun Miari Gogae		
1962	Son Ogong		Son Ogong		
1962	The Way to Seoul		Seoullo Ganeun Gil		
1962	Gyewolhyang		Pyeongyang Gisaeng Gyewolhyang		
1962	A New Recruit, Mr. Lee		Sinibsawon Mr. Lee		
1962	Memory of Red Roses		Bulgeun Jangmi-ui Chu-eok		
1962	Between the Sky and the Earth		Haneulgwa Ttangsa-i-e		
1962	The Best Bride and a Plain Young Man		Teukdeungsinbu-wa Samdeung Sillang		
1962	The Gate to Hell		Ji-okmun		
1962	Undercover Agent Park Munsu		Amhaeng-eosa Park Munsu		
1962	What Happens in an Alley		Golmogan Punggyeong		
1961	The Sea Knows		Hyeonhaetaneun Algo Itda		
1961	An Idiot		Babo Chilseong-i		
1961	A Flower of Evil		Ag-ui Kkot		
1961	Gate to the Forbidden		Geumdan-ui mun		
1961	Emile		Emille Jong		
1961	The Love Story of Chun-hyang		Chun-hyang Jeon		
1961	Daughter of a Coachman		Yeokbu-ui Ttal		
1961	Lady Jang		Janghuibin		
1961	Farewell at Busan		Ibyeol-ui Busan Jeonggeojang		
1961	Half Brothers		Ibok Hyeongje		
1961	Wonsullang		Wonsullang		
1961	Don't Worry, Mother!		Eomeonim Ansimhasoseo		
1961	A Torrent		Gyeokryu		
1961	Ondal the Fool and Princess Pyeong-Gang		Babo Ondal-gwa Pyeonggang Gongju		
1961	On the Eve of the Liberation Day		Pariro Jeonya		
1960	A Sad Saturday		Aesu-e jeoj-eun to-yo-il		
1960	Song in My Heart		Naegaseum-e geu nolaeleul		
1960	Sorrow like a River		Seulpeum-eun gangmulcheoleom		
1960	Although it is Far		Gil-eun meol-eodo		
1960	Katyusha		Katyusha		
1960	A Revival		Jaesaeng		
1960	A Murder Without Passion		Jeong-yeol-eobsneun sal-in		
1960	The Grief of a Rebel		Ban-yeogja-ui bi-ae		
1960	A Sunny Field		Haesbich ssod-ajineun beolpan		
1960	As You Please		Jemeosdaelo		
1960	Homecoming		Gwigeorae		
1960	A Stormy Hill		Pogpung-ui eondeog		
1960	The Milky Way in the Blue Sky		Pureunhanul Eunhasu		
1959	Rainy Day 3 p.m.		Bioneun Narui Ohu Sesi		
1959	A Barber of Jangmaru Village		Jangmaruchonui Ibalsa		
1959	Daewongun Regent and Queen Minbi		Daewongungwa Minbi		
1959	Sorrow of Twilight		Hwanghonui Aesang		
1959	An Inn		Yeoinsuk		
1959	A Youth Theater		Cheongchungeukjang		
1959	If You Overcome the Crisis		Gogaereul Neomeumyeon		
1959	Affection and Apathy		Yujeongmujeong (original title: Pamun)		
1959	Streets of the Sun		Taeyangui Geori		
1959	No More Tragedies		Bigeugeun Eopda		
1959	You Don't Know of My Heart		Namui Sokdo Moreugo		
1959	Independence Association and Young Lee Seung-Man		Dongniphyeophoewa Cheongnyeon Lee Seung-man		
1959	Before a Love is Gone		Sarangi Gagi Jeone		
1959	A Way of a Body		Yukcheui Gil, The Way of All Flesh		
1959	Burden of Love		Sarangui Sipjaga		
1959	Stars Over the Window		Byeoreun Changneomeoro		
1959	Always Thinking of You		Jana Kkaena		
1958	Over the Mountain and Sea		Sanneom-eo badageonneo		
1958	The Sad Rose		Jangmineun seulpeuda		
1958	The First Snow		Choseol		
1958	The Star of Lost Paradise		sequela		
1958	The Mother and Daughter		Monyeo		
1958	The Star in My Heart		Byeol-a nae gaseum-e		
1957	The Twilight Train		Hwanghon-yeolcha		

== Awards ==
- 1965, the 3rd Blue Dragon Film Awards : Favorite Actress
- 1966, the 4th Blue Dragon Film Awards : Favorite Actress
- 1967, the 5th Blue Dragon Film Awards : Favorite Actress
- 1969, the 5th Baeksang Arts Awards : Best Film Acting (대원군)
- 1970, the 6th Baeksang Arts Awards : Favorite Film Actress selected by readers
- 1970, the 7th Blue Dragon Film Awards : Best Actress (너의 이름은 여자)
- 1971, the 7th Baeksang Arts Awards : Favorite Film Actress selected by readers
- 1971, the 8th Blue Dragon Film Awards : Favorite Actress
- 1972, the 8th Baeksang Arts Awards : Favorite Film Actress selected by readers
- 1972, the 9th Blue Dragon Film Awards : Favorite Actress
- 1973, the 9th Baeksang Arts Awards : Favorite Film Actress selected by readers
- 1974, the 10th Baeksang Arts Awards : Best Film Acting (잡초)
- 1974, the 10th Baeksang Arts Awards : Favorite Film Actress selected by readers
- 1974, the 13th Grand Bell Awards : Best Actress (토지)
- 1975, the 14th Grand Bell Awards : Best Actress (육체의 약속)
- 1985, the 24th Grand Bell Awards : Best Actress (길소뜸)
- 1987, the 23rd Baeksang Arts Awards : Best Film Acting (티켓)
- 1987, the 7th Korean Association of Film Critics Awards : Best Actress (티켓)
- 1990, the 28th Grand Bell Awards : Best Supporting Actress (추억의 이름으로)
- 1991, the 15th Golden Cinematography Awards : Favorite Actress
- 1992, the 30th Grand Bell Awards : Planning Award (명자 아끼꼬 쏘냐)
- 2000, the 37th Grand Bell Awards : Film Development Lifetime Achievement
- 2000, the 20th Korean Association of Film Critics Awards : Lifetime Achievement (전 영화인협회 이사장)
