= Tae Hyun-sil =

South Korean actress (born 1941)

- Tae in 1962
- Born: November 11, 1941 (age 84); Songjin, Korea, Empire of Japan
- Occupation: Actress
- Years active: 1962–2007

Korean name
- Hangul: 태현실
- Hanja: 太賢室
- RR: Tae Hyeonsil
- MR: T'ae Hyŏnsil

Tae Hyun-sil (Korean: 태현실; born November 11, 1941) is a South Korean actress. Tae was born in Songjin, Kankyōhoku Province, Korea, Empire of Japan in 1941.

== Career ==
While studying Film at Dongguk University, she was selected as a TV actress in a public recruit held by KBS. While preparing to star for a drama series, Tae was offered to be an exclusive actress of Shin Film established by Shin Sang-ok. Tae's debut film is Beautiful Shroud, directed by Lee Hyeong-pyo in 1962. With the film, she won New Actress from the 1963 Buil Awards. Since her debut as an actress, Tae has starred in about 300 films. 250 films were shot during 7 years and were mostly roles in depicting a cheerful university student or cute daughter characters. Tae married businessman Kim Cheol-hwan in 1968. She resumed her acting career by starring in a daily soap opera Jangmi-ui geori.

== Filmography ==
*Note; the whole list is referenced.

Year	English title	Korean title	Romanization	Role	Director
2007	Virgin Snow		Cheonnun		
	Paradise Lost		Sillag-won		
	Boss		Boseu		
	The Man Who Always Takes the Last Train		Eonjena magchaleul tago oneun salam		
	Do You Like the Afternoon After the Rain?		Bigae-in ohuleul joh-ahase-yo		
	Lost Love		Ilh-eobeolin neo		
	A Pale Rainy Day		Ha-yan bi-yo-il		
	Honeymoon		Milwol		
	Gam-dong		Kkamdong		
	That Last Winter		Geu magimak gyeowul		
	Sorrow		Bichang		
1986	Eunuch		Naesi		
	A Long Journey, A Long Tunnel		Meon yeohaeng gin teoneol		
	The Last Month of Pregnancy		Mansag		
	The Oldest Son		Jangnam		
1984	Between the Knees		Muleupgwa muleupsa-i		
	The House Where Sun Rises		Haetteuneun jib		
	Wild Woman		Yaseong-ui cheonyeo		
	Sorrow To Even Those Stars...		Seulpeum-eun jeobyeoldeul-egedo		
	The Panmunjom Poplar Operation		Panmunjeom milyunamu jagjeon		
1977	Chu-ha, My Love		Chu Ha naesalang		
1977	A War Diary		Nanjung-ilgi		
1977	The Popular Student		Somunnan gogyosaeng		
1976	Wife		Anae		
1976	Wonsan Secret Operation		Wonsangongjag		
1976	Ever So Much Good!		Neomu Neomu Joh-eun geo-ya		
1976	Five Commandments		Ogye		
1976	Lovers In The Rain		Bissog-ui yeon-indeul		
1976	Good Bye, Sir!		Seonsaengnim annyeong		
1976	My Love, Elena		Naesalang Elena		
1976	Murder With Ax In Pan Moon Jeom		Panmunjeom dokkisal-in		
1975	Outing In 10 Years		Sibnyeonman-ui oechul		
1975	Graduating School Girls		Yeogojol-eobban		
1974	Snowy Night		Seol-ya		
1974	In a Lonely Mountain Villa		Oelo-un sanjang-eseo		
1974	First snow		Sinseol		
1974	I Have to Live		Naneun sal-a-ya handa		
1973	False Charge		Numyeong		
1973	Father		Bu		
1973	The Military Academy		Yuggunsagwanhaggyo		
1973	A Family With Many Daughters		Ttalbujajib		
1973	Way of Woman		Yeolo		
1973	General Tiger		Holang-ijanggun		
1973	Way of Woman 2		Yeolo		
1973	Leaving Myeong Dong		Myeongdong-eul tteonamyeonseo		
1973	Obaekhwa		Obaeghwa		
1973	Daddy's name is...		Appa-ui ileum-eun		
1972	Aunt		Imo		
1972	An Odd General		Byeolnanjanggun		
1972	Don't Cry My Daughter		Naettal-a uljimala		
1969	Lost Love in the Mist		Angaesoge Gabeolin Sarang		
1969	Gallant Man		Paldo Sanai		
1968	Escape		Talchul Sipchilsi		
1968	Your Name		Geudae Ireumeun		
1968	Spring Breeze		Chunpung		
1968	The Geisha of Korea		Paldo Gisaeng		
1968	Femme Fatale, Jang Hee-bin		Yohwa, Jang Hee-bin		
1968	A Wondering Swordsman		Yurang-ui Geom-ho		
1968	Warm Wind		Nanpung		
1968	A Wandering Swordsman and 108 Bars of Gold		Nageune Geomgaek Hwanggeum 108 Gwan		
1968	A Man of Great Strength: Im Ggyeok-jeong		Cheonha Jangsa, Im Ggyeok-jeong		
1968	Chunhyang		Chunhyang		
1968	Daughter		Ttal		
1968	Blue Writings of Farewell		Paran Ibyeorui Geulssi		
1968	A Devoted Love		Sunaebo		
1968	Horrible 18 Days		Gongpo-ui Sipparil		
1968	Fallen Leaves		Nagyeop		
1968	Arirang		Airang		
1968	Nice Girls		Meojaeng-i Agassideul		
1968	Mother Gisaeng		Eeomma Gisaeng		
1968	Vega		Jiknyeoseong		
1967	Do Not Tempt Me		Yuhokaji Mara		
1967	Nine Defecting Soldiers		Gu-inui Gwisunbyeong		
1967	Cheerful Girl		Gibunpa Agassi		
1967	Dolmuji		Dolmusi		
1967	A Meritorious Retainer		Ildeunggongsin		
1967	Love Rides the Surf		Sarangeun Padoreul Tago		
1967	The Sun is Mine		Taeyangeun Naeget-ida		
1967	A Virtuous Woman		Chilbuyeollyeo		
1967	The Japanese Emperor and the Martyr		Ilboncheonhwanggwa Poktanuisa		
1967	Imjin River		Imjingang		
1967	Lost Migrant		Gil-ireun Cheolsae		
1966	Women Only		Namseong Geumji Guyeok		
1966	Hwangpo Mast		Hwangpodochdae		
1966	An Invulnerable		Mujeokja		
1966	A Naked		Beolgeosungi		
1966	Crisis 113		Wigi 113		
1966	Blues of Glory		Yeongkwangui Blues		
1966	Goodbye, Japan		Jal Itgeora Ilbonttang		
1966	River of Farewell		Ibyeol-eui Gang		
1966	Emergency Wedding		Teukgeub Gyeolhon Jakjeon		
1966	Confession of a Rose		Jangmiui Gobaek		
1966	Land		Ttang		
1966	I Am a King		Naneun Wang-ida		
1966	A Long Journey		Gin Yeoro		
1966	Thousand Miles between the South and the North		Nambukcheonri		
1966	Night Blues		Bamhaneurui Blues		
1966	Father's Youth		Appaui Cheongchun		
1966	I Have Something to Say		Nado Hal Mari Idda		
1966	The Final Frontline		Choehujeonseon Baekpalsimni		
1966	I Want to Say Goodbye on a Rainy Night		Bioneun Bame Tteonago Sibda		
1966	The 76th Prison Camp		Je 76 Poro Suyongso		
1966	Lady Teacher		Gasinae Seonsaeng		
1966	The Only Daughter		Oedongttal		
1965	The Heroes in the Continent		Daeryuk-ui Yeong-ungdeul		
1965	[lBetrayer Shanghai Park		Baebanja Sanghai Park		
1965	The Nickname of the Student		Maengkkong-i		
1965	The Youngest Daughter		Mangnaettal		
1965	The Man's Life		Nam-a-ilsaeng		
1965	The Girl at the Ferry Point		Naruteo Cheonyeo		
1965	I Don't Want to Die		Naneun Jukgi Silta		
1965	The Smile at the Rotary		Rotary-ui Miso		
1965	The Cradlesong in Tears		Nunmur-ui Jajangga		
1965	For Whom He Resist		Nugureul Wihan Banhang-inya		
1965	The Fake College Girl		Gajja-yeodaesaeng		
1965	The Love Affair		Jeongsa		
1965	Only a Woman Should Cry?		Yeojamani Uleoya Hana		
1965	Lion in the Dark World		Amheukga-ui Saja		
1965	A Rooster Man		Sutakgat-eun Sana-i		
1965	Behold with an Angry Face		Seongnan Eolgullo Dol-abora		
1965	The Virgin Playing Saxophone		Saxophone Buneun Cheonyeo		
1965	The Angry Eagle		Seongnan Doksuri		
1965	The Sunflower Blooming at Night		Bam-e pin Haebaragi		
1965	The Secret Meeting		Milhoe		
1965	A Hong Kong Left-handed		Hongkong-ui Oensonjabi		
1965	The Messengers to Hamheung		Hamheungchasa		
1965	Every Dog Has His Day		Jwigumeong-edo Byeotddeulnal Itda		
1965	Come Back, Oh My Daughter Geumdan		Dol-a-ora Nae Ttal Geumdan-a		
1964	The Heartbreaking Love of Mother		Pi-eorin Mojeong		
1964	The Old Korean Folk Song in Downtown		Dosimui Hyangga		
1964	The Maiden City		Cheo-nyeo Dosi		
1964	What Is More Valuable than Life		Moksumboda Deohan Geot		
1964	The Heartbreaking Story		Danjanglok		
1964	The Thirsty Trees		Mokmareun Namudeul		
1964	The Distorted Youth		Binnagan Cheongchun		
1964	My Wife Is Confessing		Anaeneun Gobaekhanda		
1964	My Dear Elder Brother		Oppa		
1964	The Struggling Young		Momburim Chineun Jeolmeunideul		
1964	The Teacher with Ten Daughters		Sipjamae Seonsaeng		
1964	The Extra Mortals		Ing-yeo Ingan		
1964	The East of Mongolia		Monggo-ui Dongjjok		
1964	The Guitar for Mother and Her Daughter		Monyeo Gita		
1964	I Have Been Cheated		Naneun Sogatda		
1964	The Sad Movie		Saed Mubi		
1964	The Body Confession		Yukche-ui Gobak		
1964	Don't Cry, Mom!		Eomeoni Ulji Mase-yo		
1963	The Ridge of Youth		Cheongchun Sanmaek		
1963	The Pitiful Train to the South				
1963	Until Peonies Bloom		Morani Pigikkajineun		
1963	Love Making Company		Yeon-aejusikhoesa		
1963	The Twelve Nyang Life		Yeoldunyangjjari Insaeng		
1963	Dreams of Youth will be Splendid		Pureun Kkumeun Binnari		
1963	No. 77 Miss Kim		Chisipchilbeon Miss Kim		
1963	Love and Good-bye		Mannal Ttaewa He-eojil Ttae		
1962	Beautiful Shroud		Areumda-un Su-ui		

== Awards ==
- 1964 the 2nd Blue Dragon Film Awards : Favorite Actress
- 1976 the 15th Grand Bell Awards : Best Supporting Actress for (원산공작)
- 1977 the 13th Baeksang Arts Awards : Best Film Actress for (아내)
