= Kim Seung-ho =

South Korean actor

- Born: July 13, 1917; Keijo, Korea, Empire of Japan (now Seoul, South Korea)
- Died: December 1, 1968 (aged 51)
- Occupation: Actor

Korean name
- Hangul: 김해수
- Hanja: 金海壽
- RR: Gim Haesu
- MR: Kim Haesu

Stage name
- Hangul: 김승호
- Hanja: 金勝鎬
- RR: Gim Seungho
- MR: Kim Sŭngho

Kim Seung-ho (July 13, 1917 – December 1, 1968) was a South Korean actor. Kim was a star of the 1950s and 1960s and regarded as one of the best actors in South Korean film history. Kim started acting at the age of 20, but he took lead roles when he was over 40 years old. Kim is also the father of actor Kim Hee-ra.

== Filmography ==
*Note; the whole list is referenced.

=== Acting ===
| Year | English title | Korean title | Romanization | Role | Director |
|---|---|---|---|---|---|
| 1947 | My Liberated Hometown | 해방된 내고향 | Haebangdoen joguk | | Jeon Chang-keun |
| 1948 | The Sun of Night | 밤의 태양 | Bam-ui tae-yang | | Ki-chae Park |
| 1955 | Yangsan Province | 양산도 | Yangsando | Ok-rang's father (막쇠(옥랑 부) | Kim Ki-young |
| 1956 | Prince Ho-Dong and Princess Nak-Rang | 왕자 호동과 낙랑공주 | WangjaHodonggwa Nakranggongju | General Anam (아남장군) | Kim So-dong |
| 1956 | The Virgin Star | 처녀 | Cheonyeobyeol | Jeong Panseo (정판서) | Yun Bong-Chun |
| 1956 | The Enemy of Woman | 여성의 적 | Yeoseong-ui jeog | Gynecologist (산부인과 의사) | Kim Han-il |
| 1956 | Nongae | 논개 | Non-gae | Waejang (왜장) | Yun Bong-chun |
| 1956 | The Wedding Day | 시집가는 날 | Sijibganeun nal | Maeng Jin-sa (맹진사) | Lee Byung-il |
| 1957 | The Palace of Ambition | 풍운의 궁전 | Pung-un-ui gungjeon | Hwa Pidal (화피달) | Jeong Chang-hwa |
| 1957 | Princess Seonhwa | 선화공주 | Seonhwagongju | Jeonokjang (전옥장) | Choi Sung-kwan |
| 1957 | Bong-i Kim Seondal | 봉이 김선달 | Bong-i Gimseondal | Park Cho-shi (박초시) | Han Hong-yeol |
| 1957 | Don't Misunderstand | 오해마세요 | Ohaemase-yo | Yoon Sang-soo (윤상수) | Kwon Yeong-sun |
| 1957 | The Lost Youth | 잃어버린 청춘 | Ilh-eobeolin cheongchun | Baekdal (백달 | Yu Hyun-mok |
| 1957 | The Postwar Generation | 전후파 | Jeonhupa | Chief investigator (조사장) | Jo Jeong-ho |
| 1957 | The Night of Truth | 진리의 밤 | Jinli-ui bam | Choi Eok-man (최억만) | Kim Han-il |
| 1957 | Lady of Freedom 2 | 자유부인 2 | Ja-yu bu-in | University president (대학총장) | Kim Hwa-rang |
| 1957 | The Life | 인생 화보 | Insaenghwabo | Yoon Hong-deok (윤홍덕) | Lee Chang-chun |
| 1957 | Arirang | 아리랑 | Arirang | Cheonga (천가) | Kim So-dong |
| 1957 | The Star of Lost Paradise | 실락원의 별 | Sillag-won-ui byeol | Jongguk, Youngrim's father (종국, 영림의 부) | Hong Seong-ki |
| 1957 | Shadowless Pagoda | 무영탑 | Muyeongtab | Paeng-gae (팽개) | Shin Sang-ok |
| 1957 | The Wanderer | 김삿갓 | Gimsatgat | Hong Kyung-rae (홍경래) | Lee Man-heung |
| 1957 | Wife and Mistress | 처와 애인 | Cheo-wa ae-in | Hospital director (병원장) | Kim Seong-min |
| 1957 | A Brier Flower | 찔레꽃 | Hwasim | | Shin Kyeong-gyun |
| 1958 | The Hill with the Zelkova Tree | | Neutinamu inneun eondeog | Bang Eok-man (방억만 | Choi Hoon |
| 1958 | The Seizure of Life | | Insaengcha-ab | Lee Joong-saeng | Yu Hyun-mok |
| 1958 | An Incense Fire | 마도의 향불 | Mado-ui hyangbul | | Shin Kyung-gyun |
| 1958 | The Island of Disappointed Love | | Bilyeon-ui seom | Park Chu-bong (박추봉) | Jeong Chang-hwa |
| 1958 | The Star of Lost Paradise (sequel) | | Sillag-won-ui byeol (hupyeon) | Jongguk, Youngrim's father (종국(영림의 부)) | Hong Seong-Gi |
| 1958 | The Love Marriage | 자유결혼 | Ja-yugyeolhon | Grandfather (할아버지) | Lee Byung-il |
| 1958 | Forever with You | 그대와 영원히 | Geudae-wa yeong-wonhi | Sapil (사필이) | Yu Hyun-mok |
| 1958 | The Money | 돈 | Don | Bong-su (봉수) | Kim So-dong |
| 1958 | The Sad Rose | 장미는 슬프다 | Jangmineun seulpeuda | Safety guard (안전무) | Park Sang-ho |
| 1958 | First Snow | 초설 | Choseol | Heo Man-seok (허만석) | Kim Ki-young |
| 1958 | The Fallen Blossoms | 낙화유수 | Naghwa-yusu | | Ahn Hyun-cheol |
| 1958 | The Way of the Mother | 엄마의 길 | Eomeoni-ui gil | Min Seong-sam (민성삼) | Ahn Hyun-cheol |
| 1958 | Flowing Star | 흐르는 별 | Heureuneun Byeol | | Kim Mook |
| 1958 | A College Woman's Confessesion | 어느 여대생의 고백 | Eoneu yeodaesaeng-ui gobaeg | Choi Rim (최림) | Shin Sang-ok |
| 1958 | The Third Class Hotel | 3등호텔 | Samdeunghotel | | Park Si-chun |
| 1958 | The Pearl of the Heart | 마음의 진주 | Ma-eum-ui jinju | | Yoon Dae-ryong |
| 1958 | The Fallen Leaves | 낙엽 | Nag-yeob | Lee In-cheol (이인철) | Park Sung-bok |
| 1958 | The Seven Daughters | 딸 칠형제 | Ttal chilhyeongje | Daughters' father (딸 아버지) | Park Si-chun |
| 1959 | Looking for a Sunny Place | 양지를 찾아서 | Yangjileul Chajaseo | | Kwon Young-soon |
| 1959 | A Way of a Body | 육체의 길 | Yukcheui Gil | Kim Sang-do (김상도) | Jo Pyeong-ha |
| 1959 | Heungbu and Nolbu | 흥부와 놀부 | Heungbu-wa Nolbu | | Kang Tae-woong |
| 1959 | A Blood Bamboo | 한말풍운과 민충정공 | Hanmalpung-ungwa Minchungjeonggong | Ito Hirobumi 이토 히로부미) | Yoon Bongchun |
| 1959 | Chun-Hui | 춘희 | Chunhui | Min Du-hwan | Shin Sang-ok |
| 1959 | Always Thinking of You | | Jana Kkaena | Wangcho (왕초) | Baek Sun-Seong |
| 1959 | A Wife | | Anae | Videographer (연출가) | Kim Muk |
| 1959 | Madam | 사모님 | Samonim | Shim Seong-seop | Choi Hoon |
| 1959 | Before A Love Is Gone | 사랑이 가기 전에 | Salang-i gagijeon-e | Jeongsajang (정사장) | Jeong Chang-hwa |
| 1959 | Even The Love Has Gone | 사랑은 흘러가도 | Salang-eun Heulleogado | Kyungho (경호) | No Pil |
| 1959 | Dongsimcho | 동심초 | Dongsimcho | Busan President Kim (부산 김사장) | Shin Sang-ok |
| 1959 | Independence Association and young Lee Seung-Man | 독립협회와 청년 이승만 | Dongniphyeophoewa Cheongnyeon Lee Seung-man | King Gojong (고종황제) | Shin Sang-ok |
| 1959 | Sorrow of Twilight | 황혼의 애상 | Hwanghon-ui Aesang | Park Yoon-seok | Lee Sun-kyung |
| 1959 | Diary of Youths | 청춘 일기 | Cheongchun-ilgi | Park Kyung-hoon (박경훈) | Lee Byung-il |
| 1959 | King Gojong and Patriot An Jung-geun | 고종 황제와 의사 안중근 | Gojonghwangjewa Uisa An Junggeun | King Gojong | Jeon Chang-geun |
| 1959 | Streets of the Sun | 태양의 거리 | Tae-yang-ui Geoli | Park No-in (박노인) | Kim Hwa-rang |
| 1959 | A Necklace of Reminiscence | 추억의 목걸이 | Chu-eog-ui Moggeol-i | Yoon Deok-je (윤덕제) | Park Sang-ho |
| 1959 | Three Brides | 3인의 신부 | Sam-in-ui sin bu | Mr. Nam (남씨 | Kim Soo-yong |
| 1959 | Gobau | 고바우 | Gobau | Gobau (고바우) | Jo Jeong-ho |
| 1959 | An Immortal Constellation | 불멸의 성좌 | Bulmyeol-ui Seongjwa | Mr. Park (박사장) | Yoo Jin-sik |
| 1959 | Sisters' Garden | 자매의 화원 | Jamae-ui Hwa-won | Bang 방사장) | Shin Sang-ok |
| 1959 | You Don't Know of My Heart | 남의 속도 모르고 | Nam-ui Sogdo Moleugo | Principal (교장) | Choi Seong-gwan |
| 1959 | Even the Clouds are Drifting | 구름은 흘러도 | Gureumeun Heulleodo | Port captain (항장) | Yu Hyun-mok |
| 1959 | Daewongun Regent and Queen Minbi | 대원군과 민비 | Daewongungwa Minbi | Prince Daewongun | Yoo Jin-sik |
| 1959 | An Affection for 7 Days | 7일간의 애정 | Chililgan-ui Aejeong | Jeong Jin-tae (정진태) | Jang Hwang-yeon |
| 1959 | A Flower Blossomed Again | 다시 피는 꽃 | Dasi pi neun kkoch | Goyang Deok (고양덕) | Lee Bong-rae |
| 1959 | Gom | 곰 | Gom | Kang Jin-gu (강진구 | Jo Pyeong-ha |
| 1959 | A Real-estate Agent for Life | 인생 복덕방 | Insaengbogdeogbang | Cheomji (첨지 | Park Sung-bok |
| 1959 | She Should Live | 살아야 한다 | Saraya Handa | | |
| 1959 | A Glorious Bedroom | 영광의 침실 | Yeonggwangui chimshil | | Kim Eung-cheon |
| 1959 | Come Back to Me | 내 품에 돌아오라 | Naepume dol-a-ola | | Byun Soon-he |
| 1960 | An Unrealized Love | 지상에서 맺지못할 사랑 | Jisang-eseo maejjimoshal salang | | Kim Sung-min |
| 1960 | Before Sunset | 해 떨어지기 전에 | Haetteol-eojigi jeon-e | Kim Yong-deok (김용덕) | Kang Dae-jin |
| 1960 | A Terminal Station of Separation | 이별의 종착역 | Ibyeol-ui jongchag-yeog | | Park Young-hwan |
| 1960 | Homecoming | 귀거래 | Gwigeorae | Jo Pil-jae (조필재) | Lee Yong-min |
| 1960 | A Forget-me-not | 물망초 | Mulmangcho | Public prosecutor (검사) | Park Gu |
| 1960 | Bawigogae | 바위고개 | Bawigogae | President Yoon (윤사장) | Jo Jung-ho |
| 1960 | A Bloody Fight | 피 묻은 대결 | Pimud-eun daegyeol | Coach Lim (임코치) | Kim Mook |
| 1960 | Over the Hill | 저 언덕을 넘어서 | Jeo eondeog-eul neom-eoseo | Kim Chun-bae (김춘배) | Park Sung-bok |
| 1960 | Rock Nakhwa and Three Thousand Court Ladies | 낙화암과 삼천궁녀 | Naghwa-amgwa samcheongungnyeo | King of Chairs (의자왕) | Lee Kyu-hwan |
| 1960 | A Revival | 재생 | Jaesaeng | Baek Yoon-hee (백윤희) | Hong Sung-ki, Park Chan |
| 1960 | A Couple | | Bubu | | |
| 1960 | Your Voice | 그대 목소리 | Geudae mogsoli | Attorney Kim (김변호사) | Shin Kyung-gyun |
| 1960 | Soil | 흙 | Heulg | Yun Champan (윤참판) | Kwon Young-soon |
| 1960 | Mother's Power | 어머니의 힘 | Eomeoni-ui him | Lee Eun-jik (이은직) | Ahn Hyun-cheol |
| 1960 | A Son's Judgement | 아들의 심판 | Adeul-ui simpan | Jeong Hong-jo (정홍조) | Ahn Hyun-cheol |
| 1960 | A Daughter | 딸 | Ttal | Kim Bong-sik (김봉식) | Kim Ha-wrang |
| 1960 | A Murder without Passion | | Jeong-yeol-eobsneun sal-in | | Lee Seong-gu |
| 1960 | A Sunny Field | | Haesbich ssod-ajineun beolpan | Jeong Hyo-won (정효원) | Jeong Chang-hwa |
| 1960 | A Romantic Papa | 로맨스 빠빠 | Lomaenseu ppappa | Father (아버지) | Shin Sang-ok |
| 1960 | Mr. Park | 박서방 | Parkseobang | Mr. Park (박서방) | Kang Daejin |
| 1961 | Fishermen | 어부들 | Eobudeul | Bae Samryong (배삼룡) | Kang Daejin |
| 1961 | A Petty Middle Manager | 삼등과장 | Samdeung Gwajang | Koo Jun-taek (구준택) | Lee Bong-rae |
| 1961 | Daughter's Secret | | Ttal-ui Bimil | Choi Myung-woo (최명우) | Cha Byeong-kwon |
| 1961 | A Disobedient Son | 불효자 | Bulhyoja | | Lee Ma-hee |
| 1961 | The Sea Knows | 현해탄은 알고 있다 | Hyeonhaetaneun Algo Itda | Saito (사이또) | Kim Ki-young |
| 1961 | A Bar Without Address | 번지없는 주막 | Beonji-eomneun Jmak | Route owner (노선주) | Kang Chan-woo |
| 1961 | Jean Valjean | 쟌발쟌 | Jean Valjean | Jean Valjean (쟌발쟌), Jjeomdol (점돌) | Jo Pyeong-ha |
| 1961 | Five Marines | 오인의 해병 | O in-ui haebyeong | Oh Seok-man (오석만) | Kim Ki-duk |
| 1961 | A Bonanza | 노다지 | Nodaji | Jang Woon-chil (장운칠) | Jeong Chang-hwa |
| 1961 | Emile | | Emille Jong | | Hong Sung-gi |
| 1961 | Daughter of a Coachman | 역부의 딸 | Yeokbu-ui Ttal | Kim Kwan-oh (김관오) | Kim Hwa-rang |
| 1961 | My Father | 아버지 | Abeoji | Kang Chang-hwan (강창환) | Choi Hoon |
| 1961 | A Rickshaw | | Illyeokgeo | Deokgu (Deokgu) | |
| 1961 | Lady Jang | 장희빈 | Janghuibin | Park Tae-bo (박태보) | Jeong Chang-hwa |
| 1961 | Half Brothers | 이복 형제 | Ibok Hyeongje | Shin Min-woo (신민우) | Kim Hwa-rang |
| 1961 | Wonsullang | 원술랑 | Wonsullang | Kim Yu-shin (김유신) | Jang Il-ho |
| 1961 | Don't Worry, Mother! | | Eomeonim Ansimhasoseo | Director Choi (최원장) | Kim Hwa-rang |
| 1961 | Yangsando | 양산도 | Yangsando | | Ahn Hyun-cheol |
| 1961 | Under the Sky of Seoul | 서울의 지붕 밑 | Seoul-ui Jibungmit | Kim Hak-gyu (김학규) | Lee Hyung-pyo |
| 1961 | Dark Day | 백주의 암흑 | Baekju-ui Amheuk | Kim Wan-sik (김완식) | Lee Bong-rae |
| 1961 | An Idiot | 바보 칠성이 | Babo Chilseong-i | Hwang Chil-seong (황칠성) | Kim Hwa-rang |
| 1961 | The Coachman | 마부 | Mabu | Ha Chun-sam (하춘삼) | Kang Dae-jin |
| 1961 | A Gang of Robbers | 군도 | Gundo | | Yu Sim-pyeong |
| 1961 | A Miser | | Gudusoe | Park Young-soo (박영수) | Park Sung-bok |
| 1961 | My Sister Is a Hussy | 언니는 말괄량이 | Eonni-neun Malgwallyang-i | Dal-su (달수) | Park Seong-ho |
| 1961 | Love against All Odds | | Pacheon-neomeo Haedanghwa | Seogi-dae (서기대) | Choi Sung-min, Song Kook |
| 1961 | A Sunflower Family | 해바라기 가족 | Haebaragi Gajok | Jeong Jin-goo (정진구) | Park Seong-bok |
| 1961 | A Wayfarer | 나그네 | Nageune | Mr. Park (박노인) | Lee Kang-cheon |
| 1961 | Ondal the Fool and Princess Pyeong-Gang | 바보 온달과 평강 공주 | Babo Ondal-gwa Pyeonggang Gongju | King Pyeongwon (평원왕) | Lee Kyu-woong |
| 1961 | Kaleidoscope | | 주마등 | Kwon Jin-sa (권진사) | Lee Ma-hee |
| 1961 | A Dream of Fortune | 돼지꿈 | Dwaejikkum | Son Chang-soo (손창수) | Han Hyeong-mo |
| 1961 | Bumpkin Oh-bok | 촌놈 오복이 | Chon Obogi | Choi Oh Bok (최오복) | Im Won-jik |
| 1962 | Revenge | 원한의 일월도 | Wonhanui Irwoldo | Lee Hwal-min (이활민) | Gyeong-ok Choi |
| 1962 | A Runaway Wife | 아내를 빼앗긴 사나이 | Anaereul Ppae-atgin Sanai | Jang Seo Bang (장서방) | Kim Hwa Rang |
| 1962 | The Great Hero Yi Sun Shin | 성웅 이순신 | Seong-ung Lee Sun-sin | King Seonjo (선조대왕) | Lee Eun-seong |
| 1962 | Lonely and Miserable | 부산댁 | Busandaek | Kwon Dal-ho (권달호) | Im Won-jik |
| 1962 | A Salaryman | 월급쟁이 | Wolgeubjaeng-i | Park Jong-dal (박종달) | Lee Bong Rae |
| 1962 | The Seven Princesses | 칠공주 | Chilgongju | Maharaja (대왕) | Jeong Chang-hwa |
| 1962 | Qin Shu Huangdi and the Great Wall of China | 진시황제와 만리장성 | Jinsihwangje-wa Mallijangseong | Si Hwang (시황) | Kwon Young-soon |
| 1962 | The Sun Does Not Shine on Me | 태양을 등진 사람들 | Tae-yang-eul Deungjin Saramdeul | Baek Sango-ho (백상호) | Choi Sung Kwan |
| 1962 | The War and an Old Man | 전쟁과 노인 | Jeonjaenggwa No-in | Kim Un-cheon (김운천) | Im Kwon-taek |
| 1962 | A Boat That Belongs to No One | 임자 없는 나룻배 | Imja-eomneun Narutbae | Park Chun-sam (박춘삼) | Eom Sim Ho |
| 1962 | A Log Bridge | 외나무 다리 | Oenamudari | Song Gap-su (송갑수) | Kang Dae Jin |
| 1962 | Undercover Agent Park Munsu | | Amhaeng-eosa Park Munsu | Oh Cheol-bo (오철보) | Lee Kyu-woong |
| 1962 | Sorrow Is Mine | 슬픔은 나에게만 | Seulpeumeun Naegeman | Min Tae-hwan (민태환) | Ahn Hyun-cheol |
| 1962 | A Man from Tokyo | 동경서 온 사나이 | Donggyeongseo On Sanai | Monghyeon (몽현) | Park Sung-bok |
| 1962 | View from an Alley | 골목안 풍경 | Golmogan Punggyeong | Go Ju-sa (고주사) | Park Jong-ho |
| 1962 | Queen Dowager Inmok | 인목대비 | Inmok Daebi | Imhaegun (임해군) | Anh Hyun chul |
| 1962 | Heartlessness | 무정 | Mujeong | Park Jin-sa (박진사) | Lee Kang-cheon |
| 1962 | War and Love | | Jeonjaenggwa Sarang | Elder (최장로) | Kim Muk |
| 1962 | Donghak Revolution | 동학난 | Donghak Nan | Choi Soon-young (최순영) | Choi Hoon |
| 1962 | Family Meeting | 가족회의 | Gajog Hoe-ui | | Park Sang-ho |
| 1962 | Great Challenge | 대도전 | Dae-dojeon | Maenghak (맹학) | No Pil |
| 1962 | King Dongmyeong | 사랑의 동명왕 | Sarang-ui Dongmyeong-wang | King Geumwa (금와왕) | Choi Hoon |
| 1962 | Yang Kuei-Fei | 양귀비 | Yang Gwibi | Hyeonjong (현종) | Choi Hoon |
| 1962 | The Country Left Behind | 두고 온 산하 | Dugo-on Sanha | Officer Shirenkov (시렌코프(소련군 장교)) | Lee Kang-cheon |
| 1962 | A Happy Day of Jinsa Maeng | 맹진사댁 경사 | Maengjinsadaek Gyeongsa | Maengjinsa (맹진사) | Lee Yong-min |
| 1962 | A Woman Judge | 여판사 | Yeopansa | Chae Sa-jang (채사장) | Hong Eun-won |
| 1962 | Mr. Gong | 감나무골 공서방 | Gamnamugol Gongseobang | | Kim Eung-cheon |
| 1962 | The Way to Seoul | 서울로 가는 길 | Seoullo Ganeun Gil | Mingsibu (명신 부) | Lee Byung-il |
| 1962 | A Mother | 초립동 | Choribdong | | Shim Woo-seop |
| 1962 | Tremendously Lucky Man | 억세게 재수 좋은 사나이 | Eoksege Jaesujo-eun Sanai | Cha Young-seok (차영석) | Sim Woo-seop |
| 1962 | When the Cloud Scatters Away | 구름이 흩어질 때 | Gureumi Heuteojil Ttae | Oh Yoon Do (오윤도) | Lee Bong Rae |
| 1963 | An Aristocrat's Love Affair | 돈바람 님바람 | Donbaram Nimbaram | Lee Chun-pung (이춘풍) | Kim Soo-yong |
| 1963 | Bearer | 지게꾼 | Jigekkun | Porter (지게꾼) | Jo Uncheon |
| 1963 | Hundred Years' Enmity | 백년한 | Baengnyeonhan | Emperor Gojong (고종제) | Lee Jong-gi |
| 1963 | I Have a Secret | | Naneun Bimiri Itda | Choi Doo-chil (최두칠) | Kim Yongdeok |
| 1963 | The Woman's Key | 여자의 열쇠 | Yeoja-ui Yeolsoe | Song Sa-jang (송사장) | Son Jeon |
| 1963 | Heuksan Island | | Heuksando | Lee Joo-sa (이주사) | Han Hongyeol |
| 1963 | No Matter How Fine Feathers Make Fine Birds | | Amuri Osi Nalgaerajiman | Mr. Park (박노인) | Jeon Eung-joo |
| 1963 | The Rose Life | | Jangmikkot Insaeng | | Yoon Ye-dam |
| 1963 | My Old Jealous Wife | 강짜소동 | Gangjjasodong | Oh Chang-gyu (오창규) | Lim Ji-won |
| 1963 | Private Tutor | 가정교사 | Gajeonggyosa | Jeon Taek-bo (전택보) | Kim Kee-duk |
| 1963 | The Torchlight | 횃불 | Hwaetbul | Jihyang Jang (장지향) | Shin Sang-ok |
| 1963 | Black Gloves | 검은 장갑 | Geomeun Janggab | | Kim Sung-min |
| 1963 | Blood Relation | 혈맥 | Hyeolmaek | Kim Deok-sam (김덕삼) | Kim Soo-yong |
| 1963 | The Man's Tears | | Sanaiui Nunmul | Yeong (영) | Kim Ku-duk |
| 1963 | A Reluctant Prince | 강화도령 | Ganghwadoryeong | Kyung-eung (경응) | Shin Sang-ok |
| 1963 | Dad, Please Get Married! | | Abeoji Gyeolhonhaseyo | Song Jae-gwan (송재관) | Kim Yong-deok |
| 1963 | A Daughter-in-law's Secret | 며느리의 비밀 | Myeoneuri-ui Bimil | Dr. Park (박사장) | Baek Ho-bin |
| 1963 | The Wife and the Woman | 처와 그 여인 | Cheo-wa Geu Yeo-in | Kwangcheol (광철) | Ahn Sung-chan |
| 1963 | The Honam Railroad in the Rain | 비나리는 호남선 | Binarineun Honamseon | President Choi (최사장) | Yoon Ye-dam |
| 1963 | The Middle-aged Woman | | Jungnyeonby-in | | Choi Jin |
| 1963 | Dried Yellow Croaker Fish | 공처가 | Gulbi | Kim Saeng-won (김생원) | Kim Soo-yong |
| 1963 | Love Affair | 로맨스 그레이 | Romanseugrei | Youngha Cho (조영하) | Shin Sang-ok |
| 1963 | Flyboy's Penniless Trip | 후라이보이무전여행기 | Huraiboi Mujeon-yeohaenggi | Do Tae-pyeong (도태평) | Kim Soo-yong |
| 1964 | The Daughter's Medal | | Ttal-ui Hunjang | Sang-cheol (상철) | Kang Dae-jin |
| 1964 | Wife's Confession | 아내는 고백한다 | Anaeneun Gobaekhanda | Attorney Oh (오변호사) | Yu Hyun-mok |
| 1964 | When Night Falls at Myeongdong | 명동에 밤이 오면 | Myeongdong-e Bam-i Omyeon | Instructor (강사장) | Lee Hyung Pyo |
| 1964 | The Housemaid | | Singmo | Park Jin-won (박진원) | Minje |
| 1964 | My Dear Elder Brother | 오빠 | Oppa | Chungsik (충식) | Kim Dong-hyuk |
| 1964 | The Night Fog | | Bamangae | Dong-Geum Lim (임동근) | Jeong Chang-hwa |
| 1964 | What Is More Valuable than Life | | Moksumboda Deohan Geot | President Han (한사장) | Kang Dae-jin |
| 1964 | The Student Couple | 학생 부부 | Haksaeng Bubu | Kim Jong-hyun (김종현) | Kim Soo-yong |
| 1964 | The Regular Customers | 단골 손님 | Dangol Sonnim | Ahn Man-yong (안만용) | Kang Dae-jin |
| 1964 | The Pickled Radishes | 총각김치 | Chonggak Gimchi | First sergeant (상사) | Jang Il-ho |
| 1964 | Keep Silent When Leaving | 떠날 때는 말없이 | Tteonal Ddaeneun Mareopossi | President Eom (엄사장) | Kim Ki-duk |
| 1964 | Are You Really a Beauty? | | Niga Jalna Ilsaeg-inya | President Heo (허사장) | Kim Soo-yong |
| 1964 | The Single Mom | 홀어머니 | Hol-eomeoni | An Bin (안빈) | Hong Eun Won |
| 1964 | The Peacock Lady | 공작부인 | Gongjakbu-in | President Kwon (권사장) | Lee Byeong-il, Lee Sang-eon |
| 1964 | The Modern Grandma | 신식 할머니 | Sinsik Halmeoni | Mr. Park (박노인) | Baek Ho-bin |
| 1964 | The Apron | 행주치마 | Haengjuchima | Kang Joong-seo (강중서) | Lee Bong-rae |
| 1964 | The Ferryboat Is Leaving | 연락선은 떠난다 | Yeonnakseoneun Tteonanda | President (오사장) | Kim Jin-seop, Kim Hwa-rang |
| 1964 | The Governor at Pyeongyang Province | 평양 감사 | Pyeongyang Gamsa | Kang Joong-seo (강중서) | Jo Geung-ha |
| 1964 | Princess Dalgi | 달기 | Dalgi | | Wong Yuet Ting |
| 1964 | The Pay Envelope | 월급봉투 | Wolgeupbongtu | | Kim Soo-yong |
| 1964 | The Maiden City | 처녀 도시 | Cheo-nyeo Dosi | Kim Jeong-ho (김정호) | Lee Hyung Pyo |
| 1964 | Are All Potbellied People Presidents? | 배만 나오면 사장이냐 | Baeman naomyeon sajang-inya | Bae Man Geun (배만근) | Ha Han Soo |
| 1964 | The Teacher with Ten Daughters | 십자매 선생 | Sipjamae Seonsaeng | | Im Kwon-taek |
| 1964 | The Beautiful Maid | 이쁜이 | Ippeuni | Professor Kim (김교수) | Kang Dae-jin |
| 1964 | Dangerous Body | | Wiheomhan Yukche | Han Chan-yoo (한찬윤) | Kim Soo-yong |
| 1964 | The Completion of Love | | Yeonae Joleobban | Yoon Tae-sik (윤태식) | Lee Hyung Pyo |
| 1964 | The Girl Is Nineteen | 여자 십구세 | Yeoja Sipguse | | Kim Soo-yong |
| 1964 | The Father at Sinchon & the daughter at Myeongdong | 신촌 아버지와 명동 딸 | Sinchon-abeoji-wa Myeongdong ttal | Kim Oh-seon (김오선) | Lee Seong-gu |
| 1964 | Prince Suyang and Mt. Baekdu | | Suyanggwa Baekdusan | Suyang (수양) | Lee Kang-cheon |
| 1964 | The Woman of Myeongdong | 명동아줌마 | Myeongdong-ajumma | | Kim Ki-duk |
| 1964 | The Camellia Girl | | Dongbaek-agassi | Choi Deok-chil (최덕칠) | Kim Ki |
| 1964 | The Regular Tardy Student | 단골지각생 | Dangol Jigagsaeng | Jang Seong-hak (장성학) | Im Kwon-taek |
| 1964 | No Way Out | | Nagal Gili Eopda | Songsan Daejwa (송산 대좌) | Lee Han-wook, Lamberto V. Avellana |
| 1965 | Market | 시장 | Sijang | | Lee Ma-hee |
| 1965 | Throw Out Your Chest | 가슴을 펴라 | Gaseum-eul Pyeora | Buhoyeon (부호연) | Jeon Eung-joo |
| 1965 | The Widow's Daughter | | Gwabu-ui Ttal | Electrician (전기진) | Lee Seong-gu |
| 1965 | The Messengers to Hamheung | 함흥차사 | Hamheungchasa | | Im Won-jig |
| 1965 | Let Me Rest under the Blue Starlight | 푸른 별 아래 잠들게 하라 | Pureunbyeol-arae Jamdeulge Hara | Chosun Jae (조선재 | Yu Hyun-mok |
| 1965 | Two Sons-in-law | | Keun Sawi Jageun Sawi | Gilusa (길주사) | Lee Bong-rae |
| 1965 | The Married Daughter | 출가외인 | Chulga-oe-in | Deokchil (덕칠) | Jeong-won |
| 1965 | The Sino-Japanese War and Queen Min the Heroine | 청일전쟁과 여걸 민비 | Cheong-iljeonjaenggwa yeogeol Minbi | Prince Dae-won (대원군) | Lim Won-sick |
| 1965 | When a Woman Goes Over the Hill | | Yeojaga Gogaereul Neom-eulttae | Cheonseobang (천서방) | Kim Ki |
| 1965 | Mother's Heyday | 어머니의 청춘 | Eomeoni-ui Cheongchun | Gongsajang (공사장) | Yoo Dong-il |
| 1965 | A Legend of Urchins | 얄개전 | Yalgaejeon | Professor Na (나교수) | Jeong Seung-moon |
| 1965 | Farewell, Sorrow | | Seulpeumiyeo Jal Itgeora | Attorney Kim (김변호사) | Kang Dae-jin |
| 1965 | A Rooster Man | | Sutakgat-eun Sana-i | President Kim (김사장) | Park Jong-ho |
| 1965 | The Heir | 상속자 | Sangsokja | Youngjin (영진) | Kim Soo-yong |
| 1965 | The Youngest Daughter | | Mangnaettal | Hyung-tak (형탁) | Kim Soo-yong |
| 1965 | Madam Wing | 날개부인 | Nalgae Bu-in | President Han (한사장) | Kim Soo-yong |
| 1965 | I Can Also Love | 나도 연애할 수 있다 | Nado Yeon-aehal Su Itda | Yoo Hang-deok (유항덕) | Im Wonjig |
| 1965 | The Married Woman | 유부녀 | Yubunyeo | Baek Nak-su (백낙수) | Jeong Chang-hwa |
| 1965 | The Story of Local Official Bae | 배비장 | Baebijang | Local Official Bae (배비장) | Shin Sang-ok |
| 1965 | The Third Doom | 제3의 운명 | Jesam-ui Unmyeong | Jong-gyu (종규) | Kim Soo-yong |
| 1965 | Love Affair | 정사 | Jeongsa | | Jang Il-ho |
| 1965 | The Nobleman at Jeong-dong | 정동대감 | Jeongdongdaegam | Jung Jong (중종) | Lee Kyu Woong |
| 1965 | Lee Su-il and Shim Sun-ae | 이수일과 심순애 | I Suilgwa Sim Sunae | | Kim Dal-woong |
| 1965 | To the End of the World | | I sesang Kkeutkkaji | | |
| 1965 | A Life Wailing in Sorrow | 울면서 한세상 | Ulmyeonseo Hansesang | Bang Han-soo (방한수) | Noh Jin-seop |
| 1965 | The King and the Servant Boy | 왕과 상노 | Wanggwa Sangno | | Im Kwon-taek |
| 1965 | Ok-i's Mom | | Ogi Eomma | Jeong Tae-geun (정태근) | Jang Il-ho |
| 1965 | Madam Oh | 오마담 | Omadam | Song Ki-ho (송기호) | Bong-rae Lee |
| 1965 | The Contract Marriage | 계약 결혼 | Gyegag Gyeolhon | Park Nak-jun (박낙준) | Jang Il-ho |
| 1965 | The Great Sokgulam Cave Temple | 대석굴암 | Dae Seoggul-am | Kim Jo-rang (김조랑) | Hong Sung-gi |
| 1965 | The Way of the Woman | | Yeoja-ui Gil | Immigration officer (이주사) | Lee Hyung Pyo |
| 1965 | Hwang, Man of Wealth at Mapo | 마포사는 황부자 | Mapo Saneun Hwangbuja | Hwanggeobbi (황고비) | Lee Bong-rae |
| 1965 | Come Back, Oh My Daughter Geumdan | | Dol-a-ora Nae Ttal Geumdan-a | Shin Mun-jun (신문준) | Kim Ki-poong |
| 1965 | The First Love | 첫사랑 | Cheossarang | Hwang Ui-won (황의원) | Kim Ki |
| 1965 | The Night Street of the Vagabond | 나그네 밤거리 | Nageune Bamgeori | Doo-chil (두칠) | Choi Young-cheol |
| 1966 | Tyrant | 대폭군 | Daepokgun | King of Myojang 묘장왕) | Lim Won-sik |
| 1966 | Miss Samcheonpo | 삼천포 아가씨 | Samcheonpo Agassi | Fisherman (어부) | Kang Chan-woo |
| 1966 | Tragedy on a Solitary Mountain | 소문난 여자 | Somunnan Yeoja | | Lee Hyung-pyo |
| 1966 | The Way to Seonghwangdang | 성황당 고갯길 | Seonghwangdang Gogaetgil | Kim Man-seok (김만석) | Kang Chan-woo |
| 1966 | Mother | 친정 어머니 | Chinjeong Eomeoni | Park Joo-sa (박주사) | Kim Ki-duk |
| 1966 | Divorce Clinic | 이혼 상담소 | Ihonsangdamso | Park Ik-seo (박익서) | Hwang Yong-ha |
| 1966 | A Journey | 여정 | Yeojeong | Medic (의사) | |
| 1966 | Land | 땅 | Ttang | Kim Deok-bo (김덕보) | Kim Dong-hyuk |
| 1966 | I Am a King | 나는 왕이다 | Naneun Wang-ida | Maeng Du-ho (맹주오) | Im Kwon-taek |
| 1966 | A Long Journey | | Gin Yeoro | Kim Jang-wi (김장위) | Kim Si-hyeon |
| 1966 | Flower Palanquin | 꽃가마 | Ggockgama | | Na Bonghan |
| 1966 | Why Not a Daughter | 딸이면 어때 | Ttalimyeon Eottae | Choi Young-gi (최영기) | Jang Il Ho |
| 1966 | Father's Youth | 아빠의 청춘 | Appaui Cheongchun | Mr. Park (박영감) | Jeong Seung-moon |
| 1966 | Love Detective | 연애 탐정 | Yeonae Tamjeong | Park Sang-gyu (박상규) | Kim Soo-yong |
| 1966 | Living in a Rented House | 셋방살이 | Setbang Sali | Kim Joong-seok (김중석) | Roh Jin-seop |
| 1966 | Offsprings | 자식들 | Jasikdeul | Park Chang-gu (박창구) | Minje |
| 1966 | An Island Girl | 섬색시 | Seomsaeksi | | Yoon Seong-hwan |
| 1966 | Forbidden Lips | 금지된 입술 | Geumjidoen Ibsul | Park Tae-sik (박태식) | Kang Tae-woong |
| 1966 | The Only Daughter | 외동딸 | Oedongttal | Jeong Deuk-su (정득수) | Noh Jin-seop |
| 1966 | Barefooted Lovers | 맨발의 연인 | Maenbalui yeonin | Dongwook (동욱) | Kim Jun-sik |
| 1966 | A Story of a Nobleman | 양반전 | Yangbanjeon | Bangga-nam (방가남) | Choi In-hyeon |
| 1966 | Enchantress Bae Jeong-ja | 요화 배정자 | Yohwa Bae Jeong-ja | Gojong (고종) | Kim Jun-sik |
| 1966 | A Soldier Speaks after Death | 병사는 죽어서 말한다 | Byeongsaneun Jugeoseo Malhanda | General Son (손장군) | Kim Ki-young |
| 1966 | Nostalgia | 망향 | Manghyang | Old man Choi (최노인) | Kim Soo-yong |
| 1966 | Fleeting Life | | Harusal-i Insaeng | Hwang Seok-do (황석도) | Kwon Hyuk Jin |
| 1966 | Kim's Sons | 김서방 | Gim Seobang | Kim Man-bok (김만복) | Kim Soon-sik |
| 1966 | Three Brothers and Sisters in the Shade | 그늘진 삼남매 | Geuneuljin Samnammae | Choi Seok-ju (최석주) | Choi Young Chul |
| 1967 | United Front | 연합전선 | Yeonhapjeonseon | Commander (사단장) | Lee Hyuk-soo |
| 1967 | A Female Student and an Old Gentleman | 여대생과 노신사 | Yeodaesaenggwa Nosinsa | Mr. Park (박노인) | Minje |
| 1967 | A Gisaeng Daughter-in-law | 어느 기생 며느리 | Eoneu Gisaeng Myeoneuri | Seonho (선호) | Ha Han-soo |
| 1967 | Mubeonji | | Mubeonji | Park Seung-ho (박승호) | Kang Dae-jin |
| 1967 | The Third Youth | 제3의 청춘 | Jesamui Cheongchun | Im Bong-su (임봉수) | Sim Woo-seop |
| 1967 | Full Ship | 만선 | Manseon | Gom-chi (곰치) | Kim Soo-yong |
| 1967 | Dolmuji | | Dolmusi | Kim Si-joong (김시중) | Jeong Chang-hwa |
| 1967 | Revenge for Me | | Naehaneul Pureodao | Kim Dal-su (김달수) | Kim Bong-hwan |
| 1967 | A College Girl Asking for Direction | 길을 묻는 여대생 | Gil-eul Munneun Yeodaesaeng | Yang Seong-il (양성일) | Kim Soo-kyu |
| 1967 | Six Daughters | 팔도강산 | Paldogangsan | First father-in-law (첫 사돈) | Bae Seok-in |
| 1967 | Love Rides the Surf | 사랑은 파도를 타고 | Sarangeun Padoreul Tago | Hong Eun-seong (홍은성) | Go Young-nam |
| 1967 | Chun-Hui | 춘희 | Chunhui | Yeong-il Bu (영일 부) | Chung Jin-woo |
| 1967 | Stroller | 역마 | Yeogma | Oh Dong-woon (오동운) | Kim Kang-yun |
| 1967 | Joy | 환희 | Hwanhui | Mr. Shin (신노인) | Park Jong-ho |
| 1967 | Madame Jet | 제트부인 | Jeteu Buin | Jeon Dae-po (전대포) | Lee Kyu Woong |
| 1967 | The King with My Face | 鐵頭皇帝 | Cheolmyeonhwangje | Lord Tau Po Bei | Ho Meng Hua |
| 1967 | The Body's Destination | 육체의 길 | Yugcheui Gil, The Way of All Flesh | Kim Sang-do (김상도) | Jo Keung Ha |
| 1968 | Youth Gone in Void | 허공에 진 청춘 | Heogong-e Jin Cheongchun | | Jeong-won |
| 1968 | The General's Mustache | 장군의 수염 | Janggun-ui Suyeom | Detective Park (박형사 | Lee Seong-gu |
| 1968 | Winds and Clouds | 풍운 - 임란야화 | Pung-un; Imran Yahwa | Tonkugawa Ieyasu (도꾸가와 이에야스) | Kwon Young-soon |
| 1968 | The Land of Korea | 팔도강산 2 | Paldo-gangsan | | Yang Jong-hae |
| 1968 | The Eternal Motherhood | 영원한 모정 | Yeongwonhan mojeong | Kim Man-ho (김만호) | Jo Geung-ha |
| 1968 | Acknowledgement | | Nae Moksum Dahadorog | Eunshik (은식) | Ahn Hyun-cheol |
| 1968 | Daddy, Daddy, My Daddy | 아빠 아빠 우리 아빠 | Abba, Abba, U-ri Abba | Father (아버지) | Kim Ki-duk |
| 1968 | Seven Secret Envoys | 7인의 밀사 | Chil-inui Milsa | | Go Yeong Nam |
| 1968 | Chunhyang | 춘향 | Chunhyang | Woonbong (운봉) | Kim Soo-yong |
| 1968 | Madame Anemone | 아네모네 마담 | Anemone Madam | Father-in-law (시아버지) | Kim Ki-duk |
| 1969 | The Fan of Witchcraft | 마법선 | Mabeopseon | Kim No-wang (김노왕) | Lee Chang-geun |
| 1969 | Sahwasan Mountain | 사화산 | Sahwasa | Kim Won-pal (김원팔) | Go Yeong Nam |
| 1971 | A Family Tree | | Jogbo | Uncle (숙부) | Go Young-nam |

=== Producing ===
| Year | English title | Korean title | Romanization | Director |
|---|---|---|---|---|
| 1958 | Men vs. Women | | Namseong Dae Yeoseong | Han Hyeong-mo |
| 1958 | The Money | 돈 | Don | Kim So-dong |
| 1967 | Dolmuji | | Dolmusi | Jeong Chang-hwa |
| 1968 | Daughter | 딸 | Ttal | Kim Soo-dong |
| 1968 | Seven Secret Envoys | 7인의 밀사 | Chil-inui Milsa | Go Yeong Nam |
| 1969 | Sahwasan Mountain | 사화산 | Sahwasa | Go Yeong Nam |

== Awards ==
- 1963, the 1st, Blue Dragon Film Awards : Best Actor (혈맥)
- 1964, the 3rd Grand Bell Awards : Best Actor (혈맥)
- 1967, the 5th Blue Dragon Film Awards : Best Actor (만선)
