= Lee Byung-il =

South Korean film director and producer

- Born: June 2, 1910; Hamhung
- Died: 1978; South Korea
- Occupation(s): Film director, Film producer

- Lee Byung-il
- Hangul: 이병일
- Hanja: 李炳逸
- RR: I Byeongil
- MR: I Pyŏngil

Lee Byung-il (Korean: 이병일; 1910–1978) was a South Korean film director and producer. He debuted with Spring on the Korean Peninsula in 1941, when Korea was still under the Japanese rule. His best known film, The Wedding Day (1956), was screened at the Berlin Film Festival - the first Korean film to do so. Today considered a classic, it has been listed as a Registered Cultural Property by the Korean Government in 2007 and chosen by Korea Post to be commemorated in a 2008 special stamps edition together with three other representative films from 1940-60s. His next film, The Love Marriage (1958), won a special comedy award at Asia-Pacific Film Festival. In his later years he was more active as a producer.

== Filmography as director ==
Year	Title	Hangul title	Romanization	Hanja title	Notes
1941	Spring of Korean Peninsula	반도의 봄	Ban-do-ui bom		
1956	The Wedding Day	시집가는 날	Sijibganeun nal		
1958	The Love Marriage	자유결혼	Ja-yugyeolhon	自由結婚	
1959	A Youth Diary	청춘일기	Cheongchun-ilgi		
1962	The Way to Seoul	서울로 가는 길	Seoullo Ganeun Gil		
1963	A Returning Ship	귀국선	Gwigukseon		
1964	The Peacock Lady	공작부인	Gongjakbu-in		Co-directed with Lee Sang-eon (이상언)

== See also ==
- List of Korean film directors
- Cinema of Korea
