= List of South Korean films of 1965 =

A list of films produced in South Korea in 1965:

Title	Director	Cast	Genre	Notes
1965
7 Women P.O.W's	Lee Man-hee			
A Devilish Homicide	Lee Yong-min	Lee Ye-chun; Do Kum-bong	Horror	
Father, Come Back				
It's My Money	Lee Sang-eon			
The Lion of Gangland				
Market	Lee Man-hee	Shin Young-kyun	Drama	Best film at Blue Dragon Film Awards
Min-myeon-euri	Choi Eun-hee			
North and South	Kim Ki-duk			
Sad Story of Self Supporting Child	Kim Soo-yong	Shin Young-kyun	Family melodrama	Best Film at the Blue Dragon Film Awards
The Sea Village	Kim Soo-yong	Shin Young-kyun; Ko Eun-ah		Best Film at the Grand Bell Awards
The Starting Point	Lee Man-hee	Shin Seong-il		
Speak to Me, Yellow River				
