= List of South Korean films of 1960 =

This is a list of films produced in South Korea in 1960:

Title	Director	Cast	Genre	Notes
1960
The Housemaid	Kim Ki-young	Lee Eun-shim		
Obaltan	Yu Hyun-mok	Choi Mu-ryong		
Mr. Park	Kang Dae-jin			
A Returned Man	Kim Soo-yong			
Romance Papa	Shin Sang-ok			
Sad Pastorale	Kim Ki-young			
To the Last Day	Shin Sang-ok			Won a Silver Bear at Berlin
