= List of South Korean films of 1961 =

A list of films produced in South Korea in 1961:

Title	Director	Cast	Genre	Notes
1961
A Flower of Evil	Lee Yong-min			
Chunhyang-jeon	Hong Seong-ki			
A Darkness at Noon				
The Coachman	Kang Dae-jin	Kim Seung-ho		Entered into the 11th Berlin International Film Festival
The Evergreen	Shin Sang-ok			
Five Marines	Kim Ki-duk			
Father				
Foolish Chil-seong				
The Fool and the Princess				
The Houseguest and My Mother	Shin Sang-ok			
Jang Hee-bin	Shin Sang-ok			
The Sea Knows	Kim Ki-young	Kim Wun-Ha; Gong Midori		
Seong Chunhyang	Shin Sang-ok			
Prince Yeonsan	Shin Sang-ok	Shin Young-kyun	Historical drama	Best Film at the first Grand Bell Awards
