= Eulhwa =

Korean novel

Eulhwa (을화 ULHWA The Shaman) is a novel written by Kim Dong-ri.

Eulhwa was adapted from Kim Dong-ri's 1936 short story "Munyeodo" (무녀도 The Way of the Shaman) and was published by Munhaksasang in 1978. Through depicting the life of a woman whose fate turns her to the path of a Shaman, Eulhwa explores the struggles between traditional Korean mysticism and modern rationalism.

== Summary ==
Set in a rural Korean village in Gyeongju in the 1920s, Eulhwa depicts the life story of a woman named Okseon. Living with her single mother, Okseon is raised in a poor household. When she is 16, Okseon forms a relationship with the neighbor, Seongchul, and has a son named Yeongsul. Okseon leaves the child to her mother to be raised and is forced to marry an old man, but soon thereafter, her aged husband and Okseon's mother die in quick succession, leaving Okseon alone to raise Yeongsul.

One day, Yeongsul becomes sick. Afraid the sickness may kill him, Okseon seeks the help of the village Shaman, Bbakji. The shaman performs a gut (exorcism) and Yeongsul is cured. But it is not long before Okseon also becomes ill. Bbakji returns and performs the Sinnerim—a ritual to endow a deity to a person destined to become a Shaman—and leads Okseon on the path to Shaman-hood, giving her the new name of Eulhwa (transliterated as Ulhwa in the official English translation, see below).

Okseon, with her new name, meets a man named Pangdol, and the two of them live together raising Yeongsul. Eulhwa and Pangdol eventually have another child between the two of them: a daughter named Wolhui. Once Yeongsul is old enough, Eulhwa sends him to study at a Buddhist temple. While Yeongsul is away from home, he becomes a devout Christian. At the same time, Eulhwa becomes a famous Shaman; this, however, does not save her from a life of poverty. When Yeongsul returns to the village, he intends to provide salvation to his mother and younger sister through the Christian faith. Eulhwa, however, fights against her son's attempt to spread the gospel. She begins reciting incantations, vowing to rid her house of Jesus's ghost, and burns her son's bible. And as Yeongsul attempts to stop his mother from doing this, he falls onto her knife and dies. After Eulhwa performs funeral rites for her son, Pangdol takes Wolhui and leaves Eulhwa.

== "Munyeodo" and Eulhwa ==
The short story "Munyeodo", published in May 1936 in JoongAng, is one of Kim Dong-ri's earliest works. Kim Dong-ri was known to have been fond of this work, and as such, attempted adapting it several times. Eulhwa, published in 1978, is the forty-two-year culmination of these efforts at adaption into a full-length novel.

Part of the reason Kim Dong-ri continued to return to "Munyeodo" was because of the time in which he wrote the work and the issues he was concerned with at that time. Kim Dong-ri wrote "Munyeodo" during the Japanese colonial period, and at that time, he was searching for the most fundamental aspect of the Korean people, a group whose very existence was being threatened by Japanese colonialism and assimilationist policies. Kim Dong-ri's answer to this question was not Confucianism nor Buddhism, but Korean Shamanism, which existed in Korea before either of the other two.

== Themes ==
Kim Dong-ri has said that he wrote and adapted Eulhwa in order to "find a new human religion through the Shamanism buried in the weeds"—a position that he expressed in the afterword to Eulhwa's republishing. In particular, Kim Dong-ri thought that, in order to overcome the chaos and unease of the 20th century, we needed to create a new type of human and a god or gods with a different temperament from those that exist today. And it was through the image of a Shamanistic human that Kim Dong-ri pursued this ideal of a "new type of human." In this sense, as noted by one critic, Kim Dong-ri didn't imagine a world in which man and god, and heaven and Earth, were separated—instead, through a Shamanistic world view, he searched for the possibility that humans could become gods.

== Critical reception ==
Eulhwa has been lauded as a work that perceptively depicts the conflict and antagonism between Shamanism and Christianity, East and West, traditional mysticism and modern rationalism, and which successfully attempts to elevate the native ethos of Koreans to universal and humanistic themes. In addition to this, the literary circles of Korea acknowledged Kim Dong-ri's astonishing feat of carefully adapting his famous short story into a full-length novel for more than forty years. Around the time of Eulhwa's publishing, interest in "Munyeodo" had been rekindled. Eulhwa also received attention abroad, as it was chosen as a candidate for the Nobel Prize in literature in 1982.

== Adaption ==
=== Eulhwa (movie) ===
Eulhwa was adapted into a movie bearing the same. The movie Eulhwa was released in Korean theatres on the 28th of September in 1979. The script was written by Shin Bong-seung, who used Kim Dong-ri's novel as source material, and the movie was directed by Byeon Jang-ho. Just as in the novel, the movie depicts the conflict between a Christian son and the Shaman mother he attempts to convert, and gives a compelling picture of a time in Korean history when Christian thought and native Korean faith were colliding. The movie stars famous actors and actresses such as Kim Ji-mee, Jeong Ae-ran, Baek Il-seob, and Lee Sun-jae. For her role in Eulhwa, Jeong Ae-ran won the 1979 Daejong Film award for Best Supporting Actress. Attracting more than 110,000 moviegoers, Eulhwa was one of the top ten box office hits of the 1970s in Korea.

=== Eulhwa (drama) ===
Eulhwa was a single-episode drama that aired on KBS on December 18, 1980. The screenplay was based on Kim Dong-ri's novel, Eulhwa, and was written by Jung Ha Youn. Eulhwa was the first single-episode drama produced and adapted from a classic of Korean literature by KBS's 'TV Cultural Center'. The drama stars Chang Mi-hee, Baek Yun-shik, Im Dong-jin, and Kim Na-young. The drama won the Grand Prize in TV for the Baeksang Arts Award in 1981.

== Bibliography ==
=== Editions ===
- Kim, Dong-ri. Eulhwa. Moonhaksasang, 1978.
- Kim, Dong-ri. The Complete Collection of Kim Dong-ri's Works: Volume 6 – Eulhwa. Minumsa, 1995.
- Kim, Dong-ri. The Complete Works of Kim Dong-ri: Volume 2 – Eulhwa. Gaegangmunyae, 2013.

== Works in Translation ==
<<을화>>, 문학사상, 1978 / ULHWA the Shaman, Larchwood, 1979.

<<을화>>, 문학사상, 1978 / La Chamane, Maisonneuve & Larose, 2001.

<<을화>>, 문학사상, 1978 / Ulhwa, die schamanin, Pendragon, 2005.

<<을화>>, 문학사상, 1978 / ULHWA, la exorcista, Editorial Complutense, 2000.

<<을화>>, 문학사상, 1978 / LA SCIAMANA DI CHATSIL, O barra O, 2006.

<<을화>>, 문학사상, 1978 / ULHVA, ŠAMANKA, Geopoetika, 2019.

<<을화>>, 문학사상, 1978 / 巫女乙火, 成甲書房, 1982.

<<을화>>, 문학사상, 1978 /乙火, 上海译文出版社, 2004.
