= Between the Knees =

- Film poster
- Directed by: Lee Jang-ho
- Written by: Lee Jang-ho
- Produced by: Lee Tae-won
- Starring: Lee Bo-hee; Ahn Sung-ki
- Cinematography: Seo Jeong-min
- Edited by: Kim Hyeong-ju
- Music by: Jeong Min-seob
- Distributed by: Taehung Pictures
- Release date: September 30, 1984 (Korea)
- Running time: 97 minutes
- Country: South Korea
- Language: Korean

Between the Knees (Korean: 무릎과 무릎사이; RR: Mureupgwa mureupsai) is a 1984 South Korean erotic drama film about a young woman with a traumatizing past. She grows to be a talented musician, with a fiancé. However, events from her and her family's past come back to haunt her in more ways than one.

== Cast ==
- Ahn Sung-ki
- Lee Bo-hee
- Yim Sung-min
- Lee Hye-young
- Na Han-il
- Gang Jae-il
- Kim In-moon
- Tae Hyun-sil
- Kim Tae-hwan
- Park Yeong-ro

== Reception ==
The film achieved huge success, and ranked as the number 2 highest-grossing domestic Korean film in 1984.
