= List of South Korean films of 1958 =

This is a list of films produced in South Korea in 1958.

Title	Director	Cast	Genre	Notes
1958
Confession of a University Student	Shin Sang-ok			
A Country Girl	Park Young-hwan			
First Snow	Kim Ki-young	Kim Ji-mee; Kim Seung-ho		
A Flower in Hell	Shin Sang-ok	Choi Eun-hee		
Forever With You	Yu Hyun-mok			
Free Marriage	Lee Byung-il			
The Hill With a Zelkova Tree	Choi Hoon			
Money	Kim So-dong	Kim Seung-ho		
A Mother's Love	Yang Ju-nam			
