= Madam Oh =

- Directed by: Bong-rae Lee
- Written by: Jung-hie Kim
- Produced by: Jeong-hwan Kwak
- Starring: Hye-jeong Kim; Mu-ryong Choi; Seung-Ho Kim; Jeong-sun Hwang
- Cinematography: Myeong-hie Ahn
- Edited by: Hui-su Kim
- Music by: Yun-ju Jeong
- Release date: March 8, 1965
- Country: South Korea
- Language: Korean

Madam Oh is 1965 South Korean drama film directed by Bong-rae Lee.

== Plot ==
During Japan's occupation of Korea, a Korean man and his Japanese lover conceived a child. While his lover was pregnant, the Japanese ended their occupation and the couple was forced to separate. After twenty years, the man is finally given an opportunity to meet his daughter. He learns that she is working at a coffee shop but has difficulties with money. Against the wishes of his current wife, he attempts to help his daughter with her problems.
