= Ruined Reeds =

- Film poster
- Hangul: 상한 갈대
- RR: Sanghan galdae
- MR: Sanghan kaltae
- Directed by: Yu Hyun-mok
- Written by: Kim Yong-jin
- Produced by: Jeong Do-hwan
- Starring: Choi Chong-min; Park Il-jun; Mun Sun-seop
- Cinematography: Jung Il-sung
- Edited by: Ree Kyoung-ja
- Music by: Han Sang-ki
- Production company: Shin Han Films
- Release date: May 2, 1984
- Running time: 105 minutes
- Country: South Korea
- Language: Korean

Ruined Reeds (Korean: 상한 갈대) is a 1984 South Korean film directed by Yu Hyun-mok.

== Plot ==
The film tells the story of the Korean wife of an American GI who struggles to save her mixed-race son after he joins a biker gang.

== Cast ==
- Choi Chong-min
- Park Il-jun
- Mun Sun-seop
- Lee Ja-young
- Na So-un
- Moon Mi-bong
- Han Jae-su
- Jang Gang-won
