= List of South Korean films of 1975 =

A list of films produced in South Korea in 1975:

Title	Director	Cast	Genre	Notes
1975
The 49th Day After Death				
Anna's Will				
End of an Affair				
Flame	Yu Hyun-mok	Hah Myung-joong	Anti-communist	Best Film at the Grand Bell Awards
Promise of the Flesh	Kim Ki-young			
The Road to Sampo	Lee Man-hee			
Sad San Francisco				
True Love				
Yeong-ja's Heydays	Kim Ho-sun			
Story Of The Youth 청춘극장; Cheongchun geugjang		Jeong Yun-hui		
Lust 욕망; Yogmang		Jeong Yun-hui		
