= Mist (1967 film) =

1967 film by Kim Soo-yong

- Film poster under the title The Foggy Town.
- Hangul: 안개
- Lit.: Fog
- RR: Angae
- MR: An'gae
- Directed by: Kim Soo-yong
- Written by: Kim Seung-ok
- Produced by: Kim Tai-soo
- Starring: Shin Seong-il; Yoon Jeong-hee
- Cinematography: Jang Seok-jun
- Edited by: Yu Jae-won
- Music by: Jeong Yoon-joo
- Production company: Taechang Productions
- Release date: 18 October 1967 (South Korea)
- Running time: 79 minutes
- Country: South Korea
- Language: Korean

Mist (Korean: 안개), also known as The Foggy Town, is a 1967 black and white drama film directed by Kim Soo-yong about a businessman, Yun Gi-jun (Shin Seong-il), who married into wealth and lives in Seoul, yet travels back to Mujin, his hometown. He embarks on a love affair with the local music teacher Ha In-suk (Yoon Jeong-hee) and starts questioning his life choices.

The film won Best Director award at the 14th Asia-Pacific Film Festival.

It was screened at the 28th Busan International Film Festival as part of a 'Special screening' to honour late actress Yoon Jeong-hee on 6 October 2023.

== Cast ==
- Shin Seong-il as Yun Gi-jun
- Yoon Jeong-hee as Ha In-suk
- Kim Jeong-cheol
- Lee Nak-hoon

== Release ==
The film was selected at the 22nd Busan International Film Festival in 'Korean Cinema Retrospective' in 2017. It was also screened at the 69th San Sebastián International Film Festival in The "Flowers in Hell: The Golden Age of Korean Cinema" retrospective section in 2021.

== Awards ==
- 1967 6th Grand Bell Awards: Best Director (Kim Soo-yong)
- 1968 11th Buil Film Awards: Best Director (Kim Soo-yong)
