= Sorrow Even Up in Heaven =

1965 South Korean film by Kim Soo-yong

- Theatrical poster for Sorrow Even Up in Heaven (1965)
- Hangul: 저 하늘에도 슬픔이
- RR: Jeo haneuredo seulpeumi
- MR: Chŏ hanŭredo sŭlp'ŭmi
- Directed by: Kim Soo-yong
- Written by: Shin Bong-seung
- Produced by: Shin Sang-ok
- Starring: Shin Young-kyun
- Cinematography: Chun Jo-myuong
- Edited by: Yu Jae-won
- Music by: Jeong Yoon-joo
- Distributed by: Shin Films Co., Ltd.
- Release date: 5 May 1965
- Running time: 105 minutes
- Country: South Korea
- Language: Korean

Sorrow Even Up in Heaven (Korean: 저 하늘에도 슬픔이) aka Sorrow in the Heavens (저 하늘에도 슬픔이) is a 1965 South Korean drama film directed by Kim Soo-yong. It was awarded Best Film at the Blue Dragon Film Awards ceremony. Actor Kim Yong-yeon was given a special award for his performance in the film at the Grand Bell Awards ceremony.

== Synopsis ==
This family melodrama tells the story of Lee Yun-bok, a fourth-grader in a poor family. Unable to tolerate his father's gambling and cruelty, his mother leaves home. Yun-bok helps support the family by shining shoes, and keeps a journal. When his journal is made public in school, Yun-bok's father repents of his bad behavior, and his mother returns home.

== Cast ==
- Shin Young-kyun
- Kim Cheon-man
- Ju Jeung-ryu
- Kim Yong-yeon
- Choe Nan-gyeong
- Hwang Jung-seun
- Kim Sin-jae
- Jo Mi-ryeong
- Jang Min-ho
- Kang Kye-shik

== Bibliography ==
=== English ===
- "JEO HANEULEDO SEULPEUMI". The Complete Index to World Film.
- "JEO HANEULEDO SEULPEUMI (second entry)". The Complete Index to World Film.
- Jeo haneuledo seulpeumi (1965) at IMDb
- "Sorrow Even Up in Heaven ( Jeo Haneul-edo Seulpeum...(1965)". Korean Movie Database (KMDb).

=== Korean ===
- 저 하늘에도 슬픔이 (in Korean). Cine21.
- 저 하늘에도 슬픔이 (1965) (in Korean). Korean Movie Database (KMDb).
