= Sunwoo Yong-nyeo =

South Korean actress (born 1945)

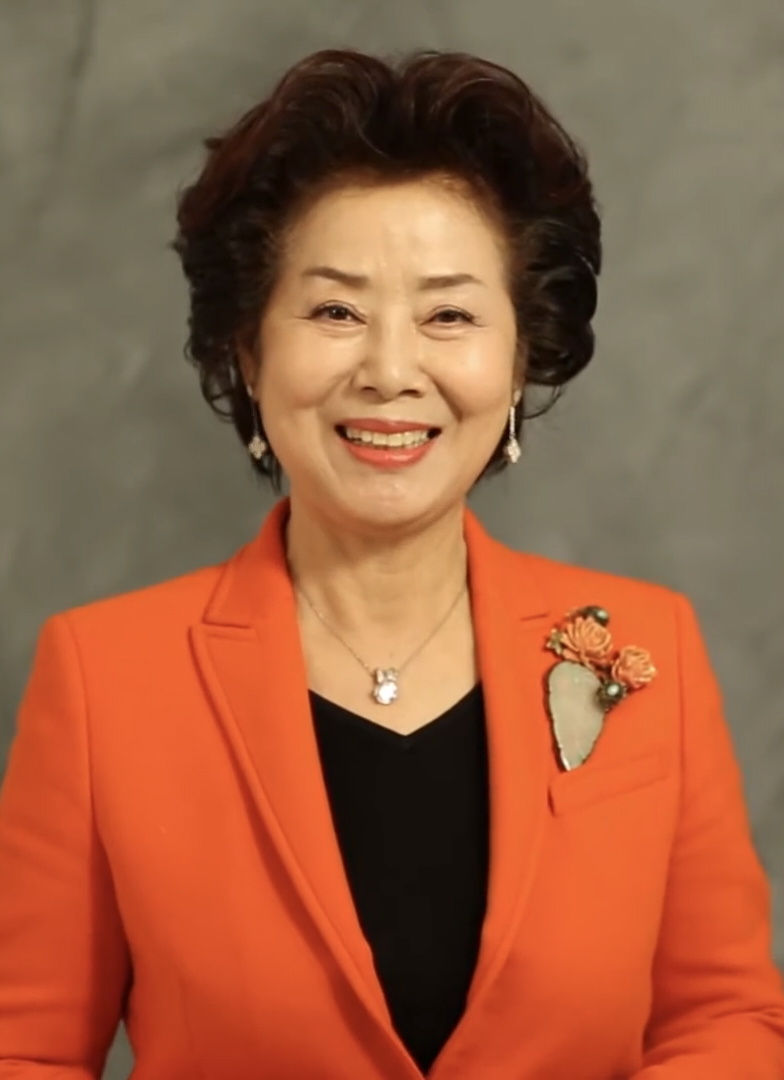
- Sunwoo in 2016
- Born: August 15, 1945 (age 81); Jinju, Korea, Empire of Japan
- Education: Sorabol College of Arts
- Occupation: Actress
- Years active: 1965–present

Korean name
- Hangul: 정용례
- Hanja: 鄭蓉禮
- RR: Jeong Yongrye
- MR: Chŏng Yongnye

Stage name
- Hangul: 선우용여
- RR: Seonu Yongyeo
- MR: Sŏnu Yongyŏ

Sunwoo Yong-nyeo (born Jung Yong-rye on August 15, 1945) is a South Korean actress. Sunwoo originally wanted to become a classical ballerina, but when she passed TBC's open recruitment in 1965, this led to her entertainment debut as a dancer on television. She began acting in 1966, and went on to an acting career in film, TV and stage spanning five decades. In 2010, Sunwoo also became the CEO of matchmaking company Red Hills.

== Filmography ==
=== Film ===
| Year | Title | Role |
|---|---|---|
| 1963 | Goryeojang | |
| 1966 | A Soldier Speaks After Death | |
| 1967 | A Female Student and an Old Gentleman | |
| 1969 | Girls | |
| 1974 | Myonyeo | |
| 1975 | Dangerous Relations | |
| 1975 | The Tae-baeks | |
| 1975 | Story of the Youth | |
| 1975 | Escape | |
| 1976 | The Kept Woman | |
| 1976 | Feelings | |
| 1976 | Blue Classroom | |
| 1977 | A Young Man Aware of Gwanghamun Well | |
| 1977 | Forest Fire | |
| 1977 | Winter Woman | Yi-hwa's mother |
| 1978 | Sadness Under the Sky | |
| 1978 | King Sejong the Great | |
| 1978 | Floating Plants | |
| 1979 | Romance Gray | |
| 1979 | 26 x 365 = 0 | |
| 1979 | The Terms of Love | |
| 1979 | Run Towards Tomorrow | |
| 1979 | Jade Color | |
| 1979 | The Rose That Swallowed Thorns | |
| 1979 | The Story of Yellow Village | |
| 1980 | Woman's Room | |
| 1981 | Subzero Point '81 | Sung-ae |
| 1981 | Rainy Days | Dong-man's mother |
| 1982 | Geniuses With the Grade F | Boarding house landlady |
| 1982 | Idiot in the Forest | |
| 1982 | Mistress | |
| 1983 | The Lover of a Friend | |
| 1990 | Man Market | |
| 1992 | The Beginning of Sorrowful Love | Mrs. Hong |
| 1992 | The Swamp Haze Will Not Clear | |
| 1993 | I Will Survive | Sug-young's mother |
| 1994 | I Wish for What Is Forbidden to Me | Consulting director |
| 1994 | Vanished | Young-ae |
| 1994 | The President's Daughter | First Lady |
| 1994 | Love on a Rainy Day | Mrs. Moon |
| 1995 | Bellybutton Bus | Hyuk-joon's mother |
| 1996 | Albatross | Eun-joo's mother |
| 2002 | Sex of Magic | Sung-bin's mother |
| 2004 | Dance with Solitude | Song In-joo |
| 2004 | Everybody Has Secrets | Mother |
| 2006 | Between Love and Hate | Young-woon's mother |
| 2006 | The Fox Family | Mother fox (cameo) |

=== Television series ===
| Year | Title | Role | Network |
|---|---|---|---|
| 1975 | Living in a Rented Room | | KBS1 |
| 1981 | Eun Ha-su | | KBS1 |
| 1981 | Heaven and Earth | | KBS1 |
| 1991 | A Honeymoon | | KBS2 |
| 1992 | Haetteulnal | | KBS2 |
| 1992 | Whale Hunting '92 | | KBS2 |
| 1992 | For Love | | KBS2 |
| 1993 | Our Hot Song | | SBS |
| 1993 | Never on Sunday | | KBS2 |
| 1993 | Unstoppable Love | | KBS2 |
| 1993 | Pilot | Noh Hye-ran's mother | MBC |
| 1994 | Farewell | Jang Ik-gu's mother | SBS |
| 1995 | Agatha Christie | Kim Hyuk's mother | SBS |
| 1995 | Hotel | | MBC |
| 1995 | The Age of Uniqueness | | KBS2 |
| 1995 | I Love Yumi | | KBS2 |
| 1995 | Fourth Republic | Jang Jeong-yi | MBC |
| 1996 | Project | | KBS2 |
| 1996 | Until We Can Love | | KBS2 |
| 1997 | Star in My Heart | Kang Min-hee's mother | MBC |
| 1997 | Cinderella | Seo Joon-seok's mother | MBC |
| 1997 | Only You | | SBS |
| 1997 | Three Women | | KBS2 |
| 1998 | Soonpoong Clinic | Sunwoo Yong-nyeo | SBS |
| 1998 | Heart of Lies | Kang Jin-jin | MBC |
| 1998 | I Love You, I'm Sorry | | KBS2 |
| 1999 | Into the Sunlight | Wang Joo-yeon | MBC |
| 2000 | Because of You | Jo Ae-sun | MBC |
| 2001 | Delicious Proposal | Jang Hee-ae's mother | MBC |
| 2002 | Dae Bak Family | | SBS |
| 2003 | Good News | Lee Gook-hee | MBC |
| 2004 | War of the Roses | Gong Jin-sook | MBC |
| 2004 | Kkangsooni | Maeng Choon-ja | EBS |
| 2004 | Choice | Lee Soon-joo | SBS |
| 2005 | Wonderful Life | Yoon Tae-hee | MBC |
| 2005 | Dangerous Love | Na Hyo-shil | KBS2 |
| 2005 | HDTV Literature: "The Post Horse Curse" | Myung-rye | KBS1 |
| 2006 | Love Can't Wait | Kang In-sook | MBC |
| 2006 | Love Me When You Can | Park Geum-rae | MBC |
| 2006 | The Vineyard Man | Song Mal-ja | KBS2 |
| 2007 | Drama City: "Sky Lovers" | | KBS2 |
| 2008 | Who Are You? | Geum Nan-hee | MBC |
| 2008 | Saranghae (I Love You) | Seok Chul-soo's mother | SBS |
| 2008 | You Are My Destiny | Lee Hwa-ran | KBS1 |
| 2008 | Daughter-in-Law | Jang Ok-soon | SBS |
| 2009 | Hilarious Housewives | Sunwoo Yong-nyeo | MBC |
| 2009 | Can't Stop Now | Gu Hyo-sook | MBC |
| 2009 | High Kick Through the Roof | Sunwoo Yong-nyeo, Lee Soon-jae's past love (cameo, episode 124) | MBC |
| 2011 | Believe in Love | Lee Mi-kyung | KBS2 |
| 2012 | Golden Time | Park Geum-nyeo | MBC |
| 2012 | The Sons | Myung-ja | MBC |
| 2012 | Family | Na Il-ran | KBS2 |
| 2013 | Can't Stand Anymore | Gil Bok-ja | jTBC |
| 2013 | Potato Star 2013QR3 | Noh Song's younger sister (cameo, episode 14) | tvN |
| 2015 | Flower of Queen | Bang Eun-ah | MBC |
| 2016 | Beautiful Gong Shim | Seok Dae-hwang's birth mother | SBS |
| 2019 | Left-Handed Wife | Cheon Sun-im | KBS2 |
| 2021 | Miss Monte-Cristo | Han Yeong-ae | KBS |

=== Variety show ===
| Year | Title | Notes/Ref. |
|---|---|---|
| 2006–2007 | Super Kids | |
| 2007 | Big Mama | |
| 2008–present | Quiz to Change the World | Panelist |
| 2009 | Conversation with the President | Celebrity panelist |
| 2009 | You Value What Is Beautiful: Becoming a Green Energy Powerhouse | |
| 2011 | Dugeun Dugeun, Studio of Stars' Love | |
| 2011 | Star King | Panelist |
| 2011 | I Want to See a Buddhist Monk with Sunwoo Yong-nyeo | Host |
| 2011 | Wonderful Korea | Host |
| 2012 | Happy Together - Season 3 | Guest, "The National Mother; Special" episode |
| 2013 | Hello | Panelist |
| 2014 | Vitamin | |
| 2015 | People Looking for a Laugh | Cameo, "A Movie Is a Movie" sketch in episode 99 |
| 2025 | Trendy Table | Cast member with Yoo Se-yoon |

== Theater ==
| Year | Title | Role |
|---|---|---|
| 1991 | Death of a Salesman | |
| 2005 | Lady | Mother |
| 2010 | My Mom | Mother |
| 2013 | War in Gobu | Kang Choon-shim, the mother-in-law |

== Ambassadorship ==
- Public Relations Ambassador 2022 Boryeong Marine Mud Expo (2022)

== Awards and nominations ==
| Year | Award | Category | Nominated work | Result |
|---|---|---|---|---|
| 1977 | 16th Grand Bell Awards | Best Supporting Actress | Forest Fire | Won |
| 2009 | MBC Entertainment Awards | Special Award in a Variety Show | Quiz to Change the World | Won |
| 2011 | MBC Entertainment Awards | Congeniality Award | Quiz to Change the World | Won |
| 2013 | 4th Korean Popular Culture and Arts Awards | Presidential Commendation | —N/a | Won |
