= The Sea Village =

- Theatrical poster for The Sea Village (1965)
- Hangul: 갯마을
- RR: Gaenmaeul
- MR: Kaenmaŭl
- Directed by: Kim Soo-yong
- Written by: O Yeong-su
- Produced by: Ho Hyeon-chan
- Starring: Shin Young-kyun; Ko Eun-ah
- Cinematography: Jeon Jo-Myeong
- Edited by: Yu Jae-won
- Music by: Jeong Yun-ju
- Distributed by: Daeyang Movies
- Release date: 19 November 1965
- Running time: 91 minutes
- Country: South Korea
- Language: Korean

The Sea Village (Korean: 갯마을) is a 1965 South Korean drama film directed by Kim Soo-yong. It was chosen as Best Film at the Grand Bell Awards.

== Plot ==
A woman in a fishing village is widowed when her husband dies in a fishing boat. She has a liaison with a mainland man who is drafted. She goes insane and waits on a mountain for the return of her husband. Based on a novel.

== Cast ==
- Shin Young-kyun: Sang-soo
- Ko Eun-ah as Hae-soon
- Lee Min-ja
- Hwang Jung-seun as Seong-goo's mother
- Jeon Gye-hyeon as Soon-im
- Lee Nak-hoon as Seong-chil
- Cho Yong-soo
- Kim Jeong-ok
- Kim Ok
- Jeong Deuk-sun

== Bibliography ==
- "GAETMAUL". The Complete Index to World Film. Archived from the original on 2012-03-25.
- 갯마을. Cine21 (in Korean).

=== Contemporary reviews ===
- November 7, 1965. "「갯마을」시사회에 독자 3백여 명 초대 / 「주부생활」사서". The Chosun Ilbo.
- November 9, 1965. "[연예수첩] 웃고 만난 한ㆍ미의『돌리』/ 『갯마을』ㆍ『시장』에 기대". The Dong-A Ilbo.
- November 18, 1965. "[영화평] 새로운 시네포엠 시도「갯마을」(한)". The Chosun Ilbo.
