= Flame (1975 film) =

- Theatrical poster for Flame (1975)
- Hangul: 불꽃
- RR: Bulkkot
- MR: Pulkkot
- Directed by: Yu Hyun-mok
- Written by: Lee Eun-seong; Yoon Sam-yook
- Produced by: Seo Jong-ho
- Starring: Hah Myung-joong
- Cinematography: Jung Il-sung
- Edited by: Ree Kyoung-ja
- Music by: Han Sang-ki
- Distributed by: Nam A Pictures Co., Ltd.
- Release date: December 15, 1975
- Running time: 95 minutes
- Country: South Korea
- Language: Korean
- Box office: $1,254

Flame (Korean: 불꽃) is a 1975 South Korean war drama film directed by Yu Hyun-mok. It was awarded Best Film at the Grand Bell Awards ceremony.

== Plot ==
In this anti-communist film, a young man hiding from the Korean War learns about his father's death while fighting the Japanese. By telling him the family history, his mother inspires him to fight the North Korean communists.

== Cast ==
- Hah Myung-joong
- Kim Jin-kyu
- Ko Eun-ah
- Yun So-ra

== Bibliography ==
- "BULGGOT". The Complete Index to World Film. Archived from the original on 2012-09-15.
- 불꽃. Cine21 (in Korean).

== Notes ==
Preceded by The Land	Grand Bell Awards for Best Film; 1975	Succeeded by Mother
