= A Soldier Speaks After Death =

A Soldier Speaks after Death
- Poster for A Soldier Speaks after Death (1966)
- Hangul: 병사는 죽어서 말한다
- Hanja: 兵士는 죽어서 말한다
- RR: Byeongsaneun jugeoseo malhanda
- MR: Pyŏngsanŭn chugŏsŏ marhanda
- Directed by: Kim Ki-young
- Written by: Kim Ki-young
- Produced by: Park Won-seok
- Starring: Hwang Jung-seun; Sunwoo Yong-nyeo
- Cinematography: Choe Su-yeong
- Edited by: Kim Ki-young
- Music by: Han Sang-ki
- Distributed by: Korea Art Movie Co., Ltd.
- Release date: January 22, 1966
- Country: South Korea
- Language: Korean

A Soldier Speaks after Death (Korean: 병사는 죽어서 말한다) is a 1966 South Korean film directed by Kim Ki-young.

== Plot ==
It is a war film about a soldier who plants flower seeds before leaving for his military service. After he is killed in combat, the flowers bloom.

== Cast ==
- Hwang Jung-seun
- Sunwoo Yong-nyeo
- Shin Young-kyun
- Kim Seok-gang
- Kim Seung-ho
- Twist Kim
- Joo Sun-tae
- Park Am
- Jeon Chang-keun
- Kim Yong-yeon

== Bibliography ==
- Choi, Eun-Yeung. "Soldiers Talk After Death". www.asianfilms.org. Archived from the original on 2004-05-09.
