= Barefooted Youth =

1964 film

- Poster to Barefooted Youth
- Hangul: 맨발의 청춘
- Hanja: 맨발의 青春
- RR: Maenbarui cheongchun
- MR: Maenbarŭi ch'ŏngch'un
- Directed by: Kim Ki-duk
- Written by: Seo Yun-seong
- Produced by: Cha Tae-jin
- Starring: Shin Seong-il; Um Aing-ran
- Cinematography: Byeon In-jib
- Edited by: Go Yeong-nam
- Music by: Lee Bong-jo
- Distributed by: Keuk Dong Entertainment
- Release date: February 28, 1964
- Running time: 116 minutes
- Country: South Korea
- Language: Korean

Barefooted Youth (Korean: 맨발의 청춘) is a 1964 South Korean film directed by Kim Ki-duk. It is one of the best-known examples of the "adolescent film" genre that was popular in South Korea during the 1960s. In 1997, it was adapted as a television series starring Bae Yong-joon and Ko So-young.

== Synopsis ==
A good-hearted young gangster falls in love with a diplomat's daughter. When their romance is opposed by her mother, they commit suicide together.

== Cast ==
- Shin Seong-il
- Um Aing-ran
- Lee Ye-chun
- Yoon Il-bong
- Lee Min-ja

== Bibliography ==
- "The Barefooted Young ( Maenbal-ui Cheongchun )(1964)". [KMDb Korean Movie Database].
- "(한국영화걸작선) 맨발의 제임스 딘，<맨발의 청춘> ("Korean Film Masterpiece Collection" Barefoot James Dean, "Barefoot Young"" (in Korean). [www.cine21.com].
- Maenbaleui cheongchun (1964) at IMDb
- Paquet, Darcy. "Barefooted Youth (1964)". [www.koreanfilm.org]. Archived from the original on 21 January 2008.
- "맨발의 청춘 The Barefooted Young, 1964" (in Korean). [www.cine21.com].
