= List of South Korean films of 1959 =

This is a list of films produced in South Korea in 1959.

Title	Director	Cast	Genre	Notes
1959
Defiance of a Teenager	Kim Ki-young	Hwang Hae-nam; Um Aing-ran		
Dongsimcho	Shin Sang-ok			
Even the Clouds are Drifting	Yu Hyun-mok			Entered into the 10th Berlin International Film Festival
Female Executive	Han Hyeong-mo			
It's Not Her Sin	Shin Sang-ok			
Three Brides	Kim Soo-yong			
