= Obaltan =

1961 film by Yu Hyeon-mok

- Theatrical release poster
- Hangul: 오발탄
- Hanja: 誤發彈
- RR: Obaltan
- MR: Obalt'an
- Directed by: Yu Hyun-mok
- Written by: Lee Beom-seon
- Produced by: Kim Seong-chun
- Starring: Choi Moo-ryong; Kim Jin-kyu; Moon Jeong-suk
- Cinematography: Kim Hak-seong
- Edited by: Kim Hui-su
- Music by: Kim Seong-tae
- Distributed by: Cinema Epoch
- Release date: 13 April 1961
- Running time: 110 minutes
- Country: South Korea
- Language: Korean

Obaltan (Korean: 오발탄; also known as Aimless Bullet and Stray Bullet) is a 1961 South Korean tragedy film directed by Yu Hyun-mok. The plot is based on the novella of the same name by Yi Beomseon. It has often been called the best Korean movie ever made.

== Plot ==
The film depicts Cheolho, an accountant living a hard life in post-war South Korea. He supports his pregnant wife, his younger sister Myeongsuk, who is a prostitute for American soldiers, his younger brother Yeongho, a war veteran, and their mother, who has post-traumatic stress disorder and is constantly screaming, 'Let's get out of here!' Cheolho has a toothache, but he refuses to go to the dentist despite his brother's insistence that the toothache is a much worse problem than paying for dental treatment.

Myeongsuk's former fiancé is also a war veteran who was left crippled and now needs crutches to walk. He calls off the engagement, believing that he would only be a burden.

Yeongho befriends an actress named Miri. Miri aims to help Yeongho get a job by casting him in a film. While reading his lines from the script, Yeongho realises that his character is being judged for his appearance, which is scarred from the Korean War. Choosing dignity over a rare chance to earn money, Yeongho quits the film. However, he later regrets his decision and wonders if he was too rash to leave such a promising job.

He then meets Seol-hui, a former nurse who tended to him in hospital during the Korean War. They confess their love for each other; however, Seol-hui is later killed in a murder-suicide by her neighbour, who was obsessed with her. Seeing her with Yeongho drove the neighbour mad with jealousy. He pushed Seol-hui off the roof of their apartment building and then jumped off after her.

The final part of the film portrays Yeongho robbing a bank with a gun he had secretly stolen from Seol-hui. After being caught by the police, Yeongho hands over the money and then his gun, breaking down into tears as he is arrested. Now in jail, Yeongho tells Cheolho to take his niece, Hae Ok, on a trip and to be a good father to his wife's child.

After hearing that his wife had died in childbirth and failing to see either her body or the baby, who had survived, Cheolho finally decided to visit the dentist. Although the dentist finds that two of Cheolho's teeth must be removed, he refuses to remove more than one tooth on the same day. He tells the taxi driver to take him to the police station to see his brother. However, once they arrive, he orders the driver to continue, repeatedly echoing his mother's plea, "Let's get out of here!" With his family gone and his toothache still troubling him, the taxi continues to drive aimlessly, leaving Cheolho's fate unknown.

== Cast ==
- Kim Jin-kyu as Cheolho
- Choi Moo-ryong as Yeongho
- Seo Ae-ja as Myeongsuk
- Kim Hye-jeong
- Noh Jae-sin
- Moon Jung-suk
- Yoon Il-bong
- Yu Gye-seon
- Nam Chun-yeok
- Park Gyeong-hui

== Reception ==
The government banned Obaltan because of its unremittingly downbeat depiction of life in post-armistice South Korea. An American consultant to the Korean National Film Production Center saw the film and persuaded the government to release it in Seoul so that it might qualify for entry in the San Francisco International Film Festival. Director Yu Hyun-mok attended the film's première in San Francisco in November 1963. Variety called Obaltan a "remarkable film", and noted that its "brilliantly detailed camera work is matched by probing sympathy and rich characterizations."

== Legacy ==
The most-cited quote from the film, mentioned in the contemporary Variety review and in later texts on South Korean cinema, is "Let's get outta here! Let's get outta here!" (가자! 가자!; gaja! gaja!)

== Availability ==
In December 2002, Obaltan was released on Region 0 DVD in South Korea with English subtitles, but as of November 2007 is currently out of print. Gregory Hatanaka's Cinema Epoch released the film on Region 1 DVD on 13 March 2008.

== See also ==
- Cinema of South Korea

== Sources ==
- Judy. (13 November 1963). "The Aimless Bullet". Variety.
- Min, Eungjun; Joo Jinsook; Kwak HanJu (2003). Korean Film : History, Resistance, and Democratic Imagination. Westport, Connecticut: Praeger Publishers. pp. 41, 46. ISBN 0-275-95811-6.
- "OBALTAN". The Complete Index to World Film. Archived from the original on 2 December 2010.
- Ralske, Josh. "The Aimless Bullet". AllMovie.
