= List of South Korean films of 1964 =

A list of films produced in South Korea in 1964:

Title	Director	Cast	Genre	Notes
1964
Asphalt	Kim Ki-young	Kim Jin-kyu		
Barefooted Youth	Kim Ki-duk	Shin Seong-il		
Confession of the Flesh	Jo Geung-ha			
Deaf Sam-yong	Shin Sang-ok	Kim Jin-kyu; Choi Eun-hee		Best Film at the Grand Bell Awards
The Evil Stairs	Lee Man-hee	Kim Jin-kyu		
Ingyeo ingan	Yu Hyun-mok	Kim Jin-kyu	Literary drama	Best Film at Blue Dragon Film Awards
Red Scarf	Shin Sang-ok	Shin Young-kyun		
