= List of South Korean films of 1973 =

A list of films produced in South Korea in 1973:

Title	Director	Cast	Genre	Notes
1973
5 White Flowers	Jung Jin-woo	Park No-sik	Drama	orig titled 5 baekhwa
At the Age of 18	Won-se Lee	Namkoong Won	Drama	orig titled Bangnyeon 18 se
A Cafe in September	Go Yeong-nam	Shin Seong-il	Drama	orig titled 9wol-ui chasjib
Cheju Island Terror; Hipijok sal yuk	Ki-young Kim; Yoon Kyo Park	Moon Kang; Mayu Loh; Keiko Mari; Alice Woo	Kaiju	A film alleged to exist, but was probably mistaken for the later produced feature The Flying Monster.
Fidelity	Ha Gil-jong	Hah Myung-joong	Historical Drama	orig titled Sujeol
The General in Red Robes	Lee Doo-yong	Hwang Hae; Ko Eun-ah	Historical drama	Best Film at the Grand Bell Awards
Heroes of the Anke				
Love Class				
A Resentful Woman	Lee Yu-seob	Shin Yeong-il	Horror	orig titled Wonnyeo
Testimony	Im Kwon-taek	Kim Chang-sook; Shin Il-ryong	War Drama	orig titled Jeungeon
The Three-Day Reign	Shin Sang-ok	Shin Young-kyun	Historical drama	Best Film at the Blue Dragon Film Awards orig titled Sam-il-cheon-ha
The Tragedy of Deaf Sam-yong	Byun Jang-ho	Kim Hee-ra	Drama	orig titled Biryeonui beongeori Samyong
