= Ingyeo ingan =

- Theatrical poster for Ingyeo ingan (1964)
- Hangul: 잉여인간
- Hanja: 剩餘人間
- RR: Ingyeoingan
- MR: Ingyŏin'gan
- Directed by: Yu Hyun-mok
- Written by: Lim Hee-Jae; Sin Bong-seung
- Produced by: Baek Wan
- Starring: Kim Jin-kyu
- Cinematography: Hong Dong-hyuk
- Edited by: Yu Jae-won
- Music by: Jeong Yoon-joo
- Distributed by: Han Yang Films Co., Ltd.
- Release date: April 11, 1964
- Running time: 100 minutes
- Country: South Korea
- Language: Korean

Ingyeo ingan (Korean: 잉여인간), sometimes translated The Extra Mortals, is a 1964 South Korean drama film directed by Yu Hyun-mok. At the 2nd Blue Dragon Film Awards ceremony, the film won six awards, among them Best Film, Best Director, and Best Actor for lead Kim Jin-kyu. The film was based on a novel.

== Plot ==
This drama tells the story of a group of men in a hospital waiting room. A dentist and a wounded war veteran are among the group. Their disgruntled conversation of their lot in life includes discussions of past love affairs and patriotism.

== Cast ==
- Kim Jin-kyu
- Shin Young-kyun
- Do Kum-bong
- Kim Seok-gang
- Tae Hyun-sil
- Park Am
