= Promise of the Flesh =

- Theatrical film poster
- Hangul: 육체의 약속
- Hanja: 肉體의 約束
- RR: Yukcheui yaksok
- MR: Yukch'eŭi yaksok
- Directed by: Kim Ki-young
- Written by: Kim Ji-heon
- Produced by: Lee Woo-suk
- Starring: Kim Ji-mee; Lee Jung-gil
- Cinematography: Jung Il-sung
- Edited by: Hyeon Dong-chun
- Music by: Han Sang-ki
- Distributed by: Dong-a Exports Co. Ltd.
- Release date: July 26, 1975
- Running time: 95 minutes
- Country: South Korea
- Language: Korean
- Box office: $4,706

Promise of the Flesh (Korean: 육체의 약속; RR: Yukcheui yaksok) is a 1975 South Korean film directed by Kim Ki-young.

== Plot ==
A melodrama about a female prisoner who meets a man while on leave to visit her mother's grave. Not knowing that the man is a thief, she promises to meet him at a park two years later, after she is released from prison.

== Cast ==
- Kim Ji-mee
- Lee Jung-gil
- Park Jung-ja
- Park Am
- Jo Jae-seong
- Han Se-hun
- Yu Chun-su
- Yeo Han-dong
- Kim Chung-chul
- Lee Yong-ho

== Awards ==
- Grand Bell Awards (1975)
  - Best Actress (Kim Ji-mee)
  - Best Supporting Actress (Park Jung-ja)

== Bibliography ==
- Berry, Chris. "Promise of the Flesh". The House of Kim Ki-young. Archived from the original on 2004-05-05.
- Berry, Chris. "Whose Story Is It? Gender, Narrative and Narration in Promise of the Flesh". The House of Kim Ki-young. Archived from the original on 2004-05-05.
- "Kim, Ki-young Master of Madness (From the 41st San Francisco International Film Festival)". www.cinekorea.com. Archived from the original on 2008-02-12.
