= The General in Red Robes =

- Theatrical film poster
- Hangul: 홍의장군
- Hanja: 紅衣將軍
- RR: Honguijanggun
- MR: Hongŭijanggun
- Directed by: Lee Doo-yong
- Written by: Moon Sang-hun; Lee Doo-yong
- Produced by: Kwak Jeong-hwan
- Starring: Hwang Hae; Ko Eun-ah
- Cinematography: Son Hyeon-chae
- Edited by: Ree Kyoung-ja
- Music by: Hwang Mun-pyeong
- Distributed by: Hap Dong Films Co., Ltd.
- Release date: October 13, 1973
- Running time: 88 minutes
- Country: South Korea
- Language: Korean

The General in Red Robes (Korean: 홍의 장군) is a 1973 South Korean film directed by Lee Doo-yong. It was awarded Best Film at the Grand Bell Awards ceremony.

== Plot ==
In this historical drama set during the Imjin War, Kwak Jae-Wu leads an army against the Japanese invaders. Once he and his soldiers have helped defeat the Japanese, Kwak refuses a government post as reward from the Royal Court, and chooses instead to live the rest of his life in Bipa Mountain.

== Cast ==
- Hwang Hae
- Ko Eun-ah
- Do Kum-bong
- Lee Kang-jo
- Kim Young-in
- An Gil-won
- Han Tae-il
- Yu Il-su
- Kim Mu-yeong
- Cheon Bong-hak
- Shin Goo

== Bibliography ==
- "Hong-ui jang-gun". The Complete Index to World Film. Archived from the original on 2012-09-08.
- 홍의 장군. Cine21 (in Korean).

Preceded by Patriotic Martyr An Jung-gun	Grand Bell Awards for Best Film; 1973	Succeeded by The Land
