= List of South Korean films of 1974 =

A list of films produced in South Korea in 1974:

Title	Director	Cast	Genre	Notes
1974
2 Nights 3 Days	Mun-jin Jo	Lee Nak-hoon		orig titled 2bag 3il
70 Women Prisoners	Ko Young-nam	Yeong-guk Yu		orig titled 70inui yeojoisu
At 13 Years Old	Shin Sang-ok	Shin Seong-il		orig titled 13se sonyeon
The Cat Woman	Hong Pa	Yongnyeo Seonwoo		orig titled Myonyeo
The Stars Heavenly Home	Lee Jang-ho	Ahn In-sook		orig titled Byeoldeul-ui gohyang
Seven Reasons for Divorce	Ki-won Lee	Eun-jin Han		orig titled Chilgeojiak
The Land	Kim Soo-yong	Kim Ji-mee		Best Film at the Grand Bell Awards
The Third Son	Hyeong-pyo Lee	Ji-yeong Park		orig titled Adeul 3 hyeonje
Transgression	Kim Ki-young	Choi Bool-am		orig titled Pagye
