= List of South Korean films of 1989 =

A list of films produced in South Korea in 1989:

| Title | Director | Cast | Genre | Notes |
|---|---|---|---|---|
1989
| Come Come Come Upward | Im Kwon-taek | Kang Soo-yeon; Jin Yeong-mi | | Entered into the 16th Moscow International Film Festival |
| Gagman | Lee Myung-se | | | |
| Happiness Does Not Depend On School Records | Kang Woo-suk | | | |
| Oh! Country of Dreams | Lee Eun; Jang Dong-hong; Chang Yoon-hyun | | | |
| Rainbow Over Seoul | Kim Ho-sun | Kang Ri-na; Kim Ju-seung | | |
| A Sketch of a Rainy Day | Kwak Jae-yong | | | |
| Ureme 6 | Kim Cheong-gi | Han Jeong-ho | | |
| Why Has Bodhi-Dharma Left for the East? | Bae Yong-gyun | Yi Pan-yong | | Screened at the 1989 Cannes Film Festival |
| Adultery | Park Yong-jun | Bang Hee | | |
