= List of South Korean films of 1966 =

Films produced in South Korea in 1966 include:

Title	Director	Cast	Genre	Notes
1966
8240 KLO	Jung Jin-woo			
Cho-woo	Jung Jin-woo			
Cho-yeon	Jung Jin-woo			
Dangerous Youth	Jeong Chang-hwa			
I Am the King	Im Kwon-taek			
It Never Misses the Mark				
Notorious Man				
A Soldier Speaks After Death	Kim Ki-young	Hwang Jung-seun; Sunwoo Yong-nyeo		
The Student Boarder	Jung Jin-woo	Shin Sung-il		
Vile Days				
Gunsmoke; Choyeon		Nam Jeong-im		
Court Ladies; Sang-gung Nain		Nam Jeong-im		
A Story of a Nobleman; Yangbanjeon		Nam Jeong-im		
I Will Be a King for the Day; Oneul-eun Wang		Nam Jeong-im		
Affection; Yujeong		Nam Jeong-im		
Let's Meet at Walkerhill; Wokeohileseo Mannapsida		Nam Jeong-im		
Villains Era; Aginsidae		Nam Jeong-im		
Hit the Bull's Eye; Baekbalbaekjung		Nam Jeong-im		
Nostalgia; Manghyang		Nam Jeong-im		
The Sword of Iljimae; Iljimae Pilsaui Geom		Nam Jeong-im		
A Gisaeng with a Bachelor's Degree; Haksa Gisaeng		Nam Jeong-im		
A Killer's Note; Salin Sucheop		Nam Jeong-im		
Love Detective; Yeonae Tamjeong		Nam Jeong-im		
Living in a Rented House; Setbang Sali		Nam Jeong-im		
The Heart Feels Empty; Heomuhan Maeum		Nam Jeong-im		
