= Ko Eun-ah (actress, born 1946) =

South Korean actress (born 1946)

- Born: February 16, 1946 (age 80); Busan, South Korea
- Education: Hongik University, Busan Girls' High School
- Occupation: Actress
- Years active: 1965–present

Korean name
- Hangul: 고은아
- Hanja: 高銀兒
- RR: Go Euna
- MR: Ko Ŭna

Ko Eun-ah (Korean: 고은아; born February 16, 1946) is a South Korean actress. Ko's acting career spanned from 1965 to 1979, appearing in films including The Sea Village (1965), The General in Red Robes (1973) and Yeonhwa (1974). She won Popular Star Award at the Blue Dragon Film Awards in 1966, 1972 and 1973, and Lifetime Achievement Award at the 49th Grand Bell Awards in 2012.

== Personal life ==
Ko married film producer Kwak Jeong-hwan on November 21, 1967. Her first child was a son, followed by a daughter in August 1970.

== Selected filmography ==
Year	Title	Role
1965	The Ran's Elegy	
1965	The Sea Village	Hae-soon
1973	The General in Red Robes	
1974	Yeonhwa	
1975	Yeonhwa 2	
1975	Flame	
1978	Chorus of Doves	
1978	There Must be Mother Somewhere	
1978	Widow	
1979	The Hey Days of Youth 77	
1979	Zero Woman	
1979	Scholar Yul-gok and His Mother Shin Sa-im-dang	

== Awards and nominations ==
Year	Award	Category	Nominated work	Result	Ref.
1966	4th Blue Dragon Film Awards	Popular Star Award	—N/a	Won	
1972	9th Blue Dragon Film Awards	Popular Star Award	—N/a	Won	
1972	8th Baeksang Arts Awards	Best Actress	Confession (고백)	Won	
1973	10th Blue Dragon Film Awards	Popular Star Award	—N/a	Won	
2012	49th Grand Bell Awards	Lifetime Achievement Award	—N/a	Won	
