= Five Marines =

- Hangul: 오인의 해병
- Hanja: 五人의 海兵
- RR: Oinui haebyeong
- MR: Oinŭi haebyŏng
- Directed by: Kim Ki-duk
- Written by: Yoo Han-Cheol
- Produced by: Cha Tae-jin
- Starring: Shin Young-kyun; Choi Moo-ryong
- Cinematography: Lee Seong-chun
- Edited by: Kim Ki-duk
- Music by: Kim Yong-hwan
- Distributed by: Keuk Dong Entertainment
- Release date: October 20, 1961
- Running time: 118 minutes
- Country: South Korea
- Language: Korean

Five Marines (Korean: 오인의 해병) is a 1961 South Korean film. It was popular genre-film director Kim Ki-duk's directorial debut.

== Synopsis ==
During the Korean War, five marines are selected for a mission in enemy territory. They carry out the mission successfully, but four of the five are killed before they can return.

== Bibliography ==
- 5inui haebyeong (1961) at IMDb
- "Five Marines (O in-ui haebyeong) (1961)". KMDb Korean Movie Database.
- "5인의 해병 Five Marines, 1961" (in Korean). Cine21. (dead link 2011-11-07)
