= List of South Korean films of 1963 =

A list of films produced in South Korea in 1963:

Title	Director	Cast	Genre	Notes
1963
A 12 Penny Life				
300 Years of Love				
Bloodline	Kim Soo-yong	Kim Seung-ho	Anti-communist	Best Film at the Grand Bell Awards and Blue Dragon Film Awards
Daughters of Pharmacist Kim	Yu Hyun-mok			
The Five Eagles				
Goryeojang	Kim Ki-young	Kim Jin-kyu; Ju Jeung-ryu		
Number 77, Miss Kim				
The Marines Who Never Returned	Lee Man-hee	Jang Dong-hwi		
Rice	Shin Sang-ok			
Ttosun-i	Park Sang-ho			
