= Kim Ki-duk (director, born 1934) =

South Korean film director and professor (1934–2017)

- Born: 29 September 1934; Keijō, Korea, Empire of Japan
- Died: 7 September 2017 (aged 82); Seoul, South Korea
- Occupation(s): Film director, professor

Korean name
- Hangul: 김기덕
- Hanja: 金基德
- RR: Gim Gideok
- MR: Kim Kidŏk

Kim Ki-duk (Korean: 김기덕; 29 September 1934 – 7 September 2017) was a South Korean film director and professor. Best known outside of Korea for his 1967 monster film Yongary, Monster from the Deep, Kim Ki-duk directed 66 movies in total from his directorial debut in 1961 until his retirement from the film industry in 1977. Along with Kim Soo-yong and Lee Man-hee, Kim was one of the leading young directors of the Korean cinematic wave of the 1960s. The most distinctive and successful genre of this period was the melodrama (Korean: 청춘영화; RR: cheongchun yeonghwa). He is not related to Kim Ki-duk, the South Korean director of 3-Iron.

== Career ==
Kim Ki-duk studied creative writing at Seorabeol Arts University, which later merged with Chung-Ang University. After graduating in 1956, Kim entered the film industry, first working as an editorial engineer. He worked as assistant director to director Kim So-dong on the film, Prince Hodong and Princess Nakrang (Korean: 호동왕자와 낙랑공주; RR: Hodongwangjawa Nakranggongju, 1956). Kim's directorial debut was with the Korean War-themed film Five Marines (1961), which he co-directed with Kim Hwarang. For this film, Kim received the Best New Director award at the 1962 Grand Bell Awards ceremony. Other major films by Kim include Until Peonies Blossom (1962), Private Tutor (1963), Barefooted Youth (1964), Keep Silent When Leaving (1964), A Burning Youth (1966), Mother (1966) A Teacher in an Island (1967), A Female Student President (1967), Madam Anemone (1968), A Starry Night (1972), The Young Teacher (1972), A Flowery Bier (1974), and The Last Inning (1977). After 1977, Kim Ki-duk retired from directing films and worked as a professor in the film department of Seoul Institute of the Arts.

He died on 7 September 2017 at the age of 82 from lung cancer.

== See also ==
- List of Korean film directors
- Korean cinema
