= List of South Korean films of 1962 =

A list of films produced in South Korea in 1962:

Female cast of the film The Best Bride and a Plain Young man

Title	Director	Cast	Genre	Notes
1962
A Bonanza	Jeong Chang-hwa			
Farewell to the Duman River	Im Kwon-taek	Kim Seok-hun	War film	Celebrated director Im Kwon-taek's directorial debut
Freely Given				
Maengjin-sa's Happy Day	Lee Yong-min			
The Memorial Gate for Virtuous Women	Shin Sang-ok	Choi Eun-hee	Melodrama	Best Film at the Grand Bell Awards, entered into the 13th Berlin International Film Festival
There Are No Bad Men				
Park Mun-su: Secret Agent				
When Acacias Bloom				
The Best Bride and a Plain Young man	Jeon Hong-jik	Kim Ji-mee, Shin Seong-il, Um Aing-ran, Choi Moo-ryong, and Yun Il-bong	Romantic comedy	
