= Kim Soo-yong =

South Korean film director (1929–2023)

- Born: 23 September 1929; Korea, Empire of Japan
- Died: 3 December 2023 (aged 94)
- Occupation: Film director
- Years active: 1958–1999

Korean name
- Hangul: 김수용
- Hanja: 金洙容
- RR: Gim Suyong
- MR: Kim Suyong

Kim Soo-yong (Korean: 김수용; 23 September 1929 – 3 December 2023) was a South Korean film director. Kim made his debut in 1958 with A Henpecked Husband and directed more than 100 movies through 1999, with his final film being Scent of Love (2000). He made many popular commercial films of the past decades, such as Sad Story of Self Supporting Child (a.k.a. Sorrow in the Heavens) (1965), as well as some 50 literary movies based on popular Korean novels such as The Sea Village (1965) and Mist (1967). Kim died on 3 December 2023, at the age of 94.

== Filmography ==
- A Henpecked Husband (1958)
- Three Brides (1959)
- Delivery of Youths (1959)
- A Grief (1959)
- A Band for Proposal (1959)
- A Love Front (1960)
- A Returned Man (1960)
- A Deserted Angel (1960)
- How to Become Man and Wife (1961)
- An Upstart (1961)
- My Only Love (1961)
- Bravo, Young Ones! (1962)
- Son Ogong (1962)
- Farewell to My Adolescence (1962)
- The Fiancee (1963)
- Flyboy's Penniless Trip (1963)
- Dried Yellow Croaker Fish (1963)
- My Wife Is Best (1963)
- The Classroom of Youth (1963)
- Bloodline (a.k.a. Kinship) (1963)
- An Aristocrat's Love Affair (1963)
- The Opium War (1964)
- Are You Really a Beauty? (1964)
- The Dangerous Flesh (1964)
- The Pay Envelope (1964)
- The Student Couple (1964)
- The Girl Is Nineteen (1964)
- The Life in the Red Figures (1965)
- The Youngest Daughter (1965)
- The Seashore Village (1965)
- The Heir (1965)
- Sad Story of Self Supporting Child (a.k.a. Sorrow in the Heavens) (1965)
- Madam Wing (1965)
- The Legal Wife (1965)
- The Sea Village (1965)
- The Third Doom (1965)
- Affection (1966)
- A Gisaeng with a Bachelor's Degree (1966)
- Nostalgia (1966)
- Love Detective (1966)
- Goodbye, Japan (1966)
- Full Ship (1967)
- Confession of an Actress (1967)
- Lost Migrant (1967)
- Lovers (1967)
- Flame in the Valley (1967)
- The Freezing Point (1967)
- Accusation (1967)
- Mist (1967)
- Children in the Firing Range (1967)
- Sound of Magpies (1967)
- Chunhyang (1968)
- A Devoted Love (1968)
- Glory of Barefoot (1968)
- Salt Pond (1968)
- A Japanese (1968)
- Correspondent in Tokyo (1968)
- Bun-nyeo (1968)
- Starting Point (1969)
- Rejected First Love (1969)
- Spring, Spring (1969)
- Parking Lot (1969)
- Chaser (1969)
- A Barren Woman (1969)
- Mi-ae (1970)
- The Bride's Diary (1970)
- The Pagoda of No Shadow (1970)
- Agony of Man (1970)
- That Is the Sky over Seoul (1970)
- Love in the Snowfield (1970)
- The Alimony (1971)
- When a Woman Breaks Her Jewel Box (1971)
- His Double Life (1971)
- The Merry Wife (1972)
- When a Little Dream Blooms (1972)
- Flower in the Rain (1972)
- A Family with Many Daughters (1973)
- Guests on Sunday (1973)
- The Land (1974)
- The Instinct (1975)
- Bird of Paradise (1975)
- Truth of Tomorrow (1975)
- Wasteland (1975)
- Windmill of My Mind (1976)
- Hot Wind in Arabia (1976)
- Similar Toes (1976)
- My Love, Elena (1977)
- Night Journey (1977)
- Scissors, Rock, and Wrap (1977)
- Forest Fire (1977)
- Two Decades as a Woman Journalist (1977)
- A Splendid Outing (1978)
- The Swamp of Exile (1978)
- The Sound of Laughter (1978)
- Yeosu (The Loneliness of the Journey) (1979)
- The Terms of Love (1979)
- Flowers and Birds (1979)
- Man-suk, Run! (1980)
- Rainbow (1980)
- White Smile (1980)
- Water Spray (1980)
- The Maiden Who Went to the City (1981)
- Late Autumn (1982)
- Bird That Cries At Night (1982)
- The Chrysanthemum and the Clown (1982)
- Sadness Even in the Sky (1984)
- Jung-kwang's Nonsense (1986)
- The Apocalypse of Love (1995)
- Scent of Love (2000)

== Awards ==
- 1965 3rd Blue Dragon Film Awards: Best Director (Sad Story of Self Supporting Child)
- 1966 9th Buil Film Awards: Best Director (The Sea Village)
- 1967 6th Grand Bell Awards: Best Director (Mist)
- 1967 5th Blue Dragon Film Awards: Best Director (Children in the Firing Range)
- 1968 11th Buil Film Awards: Best Director (Mist)
- 1974 13th Grand Bell Awards: Best Director (The Land)
- 2008 16th Chunsa Film Art Awards: Chunsa Daesang (Grand Prize)
- 2009 29th Korean Association of Film Critics Awards: Award for Contribution to Cinema
