= Yu Hyun-mok =

South Korean film director (1925–2009)

- 유현목
- Born: July 2, 1925; Sariwon, Korea, Empire of Japan
- Died: June 28, 2009 (aged 83); Seoul, South Korea
- Occupation: Director
- Years active: 1948–2007
- Awards: Geumgwan Order of Cultural Merit (2009)

Korean name
- Hangul: 유현목
- Hanja: 兪賢穆
- RR: Yu Hyeonmok
- MR: Yu Hyŏnmok

Yu Hyun-mok (Korean: 유현목; July 2, 1925 – June 28, 2009) was a South Korean film director. Born in Sariwon, Korea, Empire of Japan (now in North Korea), he made his film debut in 1956 with Gyocharo (Crossroads). According to the website koreanfilm.org, his 1961 film Obaltan "has repeatedly been voted the best Korean film of all time in local critics' polls." Yu attended the San Francisco International Film Festival in 1963, where Variety called Obaltan a "remarkable film", and praised Yu's "[b]rilliantly detailed camera" and the film's "probing sympathy and rich characterizations."

His dedication to the intellectual side of film and interest in using film to deal with social and political issues led him to have difficulties both with box-office-oriented producers, and with Korea's military government during the 1960s and 1970s. Korean critics have said his directing style is "in the tradition of the Italian Neorealists," yet "the terms 'modernist' or 'expressionistic' [are] just as applicable to his works."

Besides his directing activities, he has taught film, and made a significant contribution to Korean animation by producing Kim Cheong-gi's 1976 animated film, Robot Taekwon V. A retrospective of Yu's career was held at the 4th Pusan International Film Festival in 1999.

Yu died from a stroke on June 28, 2009.

== Filmography ==
| Title | Original title | Transliteration | year |
|---|---|---|---|
| The Crossroad | 교차로 | Gyocharo | 1956 |
| The Lost Youth | 잃어버린 청춘 | Irobeorin Cheongchun | 1957 |
| The Life Seized | 인생차압 | Insaeng Chaab | 1958 |
| Forever With You | 그대와 영원히 | Geudae-wa Yeongwon-hi | 1958 |
| Beautiful Woman | 아름다운 여인 | Areumda-un Yeo-in | 1959 |
| Even the Clouds Are Drifting | 구름은 흘러가도 | Gureum-un Heulleogado | 1959 |
| The Aimless Bullet | 오발탄 | Obaltan | 1961 |
| To Give Freely | 아낌 없이 주련다 | Akkim Eobsi Juryeonda | 1962 |
| Great Hero, Yi Sun-Sin | 성웅 이순신 | Seong-ung Yi Sun-sin | 1962 |
| Daughters of Pharmacist Kim | 김약국집 딸들 | Kim Yakkuk Jip Ttaldeul | 1963 |
| The Blue Dream Shall Shine | 푸른 꿈은 빛나리 | Pureun Ggum-eun Bitnari | 1963 |
| Extra Human Being | 잉여인간 | Ingyeo Ingan | 1964 |
| Wife's Confession | 아내는 고백한다 | Anae-neun Gobaekhanda | 1964 |
| Sleep Under the Blue Star | 푸른 별아래 잠들게 하라 | Pureun Byeolarae Jamdeul-ge Hara | 1965 |
| An Empty Dream | 춘몽 | Chunmong | 1965 |
| Martyr | 순교자 | Sungyoja | 1965 |
| Secret Marriage Operation | 특급 결혼작전 | Teukgeup Gyeolhon Jakjeon | 1966 |
| Sun Will Rise Again | 태양은 다시 뜬다 | Taeyang-eun Dasi Ddeunda | 1966 |
| Guests Who Arrived on the Last Train | 막차로 온 손님들 | Makcharo On Son-nim-deul | 1967 |
| Three Henpeck Generations | 공처가 삼대 | Gongcheoga Samdae | 1967 |
| Han | 한 | Han | 1967 |
| Arirang | 아리랑 | Arirang | 1968 |
| Han 2 | 한 2 | Han | 1968 |
| Descendants of Cain | 카인의 후예 | Kain-ui Huye | 1968 |
| I'll Give You Everything | 몽땅 드릴까요 | Mongddang Deuril Kkayo | 1968 |
| Yeo | 여 | A Woman | 1968 |
| Nightmare | 악몽 | Akmong | 1968 |
| School Excursion | 수학여행 | Suhak Yeohaeng | 1969 |
| I Would Like to Become a Human | 나도 인간이 되련다 | Nado Ingan-i Doe-Ryeonda | 1969 |
| Two Husbands | 두여보 | Du Yeobo | 1970 |
| Bun-Rye's Story | 분례기 | Bunlyegi | 1971 |
| Flame | 불꽃 | Bulkkot | 1975 |
| The Gate | 문 | Mun | 1977 |
| Once Upon a Time, Hweo-oi Hweo-i | 옛날 옛적에 훠어이 훠이 | Yetnal Yetjeok-e, Hweo-oi Hweo-i | 1978 |
| Rainy Days | 장마 | Jangma | 1979 |
| A Song Everyone Wants to Sing Together | 다함께 부르고 싶은 노래 | Dahamggye Bureugo Sipeun Norae | 1979 |
| Son of Man | 사람의 아들 | Saram-ui Adul | 1980 |
| Ruined Reeds | 상한 갈대 | Sanghan Galdae | 1984 |
| Mommy, Star, and Sea Anemone | 말미잘 | Malmijal | 1995 |

== Awards ==
- Blue Dragon Film Awards
  - Best Picture/Best Director (Descendant of Cain) (1968)
- Grand Bell Awards
  - Best Director (To Give Freely) (1962)
  - Best Director (Martyr) (1965)
  - Best Director (Bun-Rye's Story) (1971)
  - Best Picture (Flame) (1975)
  - Honorary Director Award (1995)
- Korean Film Critics Awards
  - Best Director (Son of Man) (1980)
- Samil Prize (1999)
- Order of Cultural Merit, Korean government - Geumgwan (Gold Crown), 1st Class (2009)
- Pusan International Film Festival
  - Award for Artistic Contribution (2003)
