= Winter Woman =

- Film poster
- Hangul: 겨울여자
- Hanja: 겨울女子
- RR: Gyeouryeoja
- MR: Kyŏuryŏja
- Directed by: Kim Ho-sun
- Written by: Kim Seung-ok
- Based on: Winter Woman by Cho Hae-il
- Produced by: Park Chong-chan
- Starring: Chang Mi-hee; Shin Seong-il
- Cinematography: Jung Il-sung
- Edited by: Hyeon Dong-chun
- Music by: Jeong Sung-jo
- Distributed by: Tae Chang Enterprises Co., Ltd
- Release date: September 27, 1977
- Running time: 100 minutes
- Country: South Korea
- Language: Korean

Winter Woman (Korean: 겨울여자; RR: Gyeouryeoja) is a 1977 South Korean erotic romantic drama film. It is based on a novel by Cho Hae-il which was serialised in The Chosun Ilbo in 1975. The popularity of the novel led to the film being made. Dealing with the sexual awakening of the female protagonist, the book and film earned the condemnation of conservative critics, however, the author's leftist subtext was overshadowed by their sexual themes. The film was the best selling Korean film of the 1970s, and made a star of its female lead Chang Mi-hee.

== Plot ==
Yi-hwa is the daughter of a prosperous Christian preacher and has been raised to be morally and sexually conservative. Whilst still in High School her beauty earns her the admiration of many including Yo-sub with whom she becomes friends, however when Yo-sub desires sex with her she rejects him and he commits suicide. Becoming a university student she becomes the girlfriend of Suk-gi and he too desires to have sex with her. When Yi-hwa remains true to herself and rejects his advances he rapes her. Suk-gi dies in a car accident and she receives a posthumous letter from him accusing her of being selfish for withholding from him that which she could give without cost to herself, and valuing her chastity more than those she claims to love.

Shocked by her first sexual experience and the deaths of the two men she rejected, she becomes a sex volunteer, offering her body to men to use for sex; however she refuses both emotional attachment and money. Graduating from university she becomes a journalist covering stories about Seoul's female factory workers and she meets an idealist young teacher working with the children of the urban poor. Just as she is giving her body to those in need of sex, he is giving his mind to those in need of inspiration, they are both giving "water to the thirsty". She offers herself to him for his use. Even though they are now together, the novel concludes with the implication that she will continue to volunteer herself to those who have need of her.

== Cast ==
- Chang Mi-hee as Yi-hwa
- Shin Seong-il
- Kim Choo-ryeon
- Sin Gwang-il
- Song Jae-ho
- Park Won-sook
- Han Sang-mi

== Context ==
In the years around the writing of the novel, the years of the Miracle on the Han River, South Korea had undergone a massive and rapid urbanisation and industrialisation. Led by the military dictatorship the Korean people were seen as a resource to be mobilised to build and strengthen the country. The prostituting of Korean women, especially young peasant women who in previous generations would have worked the land, was seen by the military as a means to earn foreign currency through sex tourism, and as a means of maintaining good relations with American servicemen based in Korea; the continued presence of whom was seen as essential in deterring the North from further aggression. However, this commodification of South Korean women was at a mismatch to the social conservatism of the military dictatorship and the image of the virtuous wife and daughter in Korean Confucianism. The protagonist is of a class not usually the subject of sexual exploitation, and the fact that she does not take money for her services differentiates her from her unluckier sisters. The sexual and social mores of that place and time deny her the right as a woman to be a sexual being in and of herself with the right to pursue sex for her own gratification, instead she must justify her sexuality in terms of the needs of men, as acts of charity.

During the Park Chung Hee dictatorship, film making like all other media was heavily censored to disallow open criticism of the regime. Criticism of the military government and the advancing of leftist ideas therefore had to be indirect and by allegory. Of the film genres that enjoyed the greatest latitude was the so-called "Hostess films", lurid melodramas about the world of the Korean bargirl. Despite the fact that the protagonist is neither the good nor bad girl of Korean films, but combines elements of both, Winter Woman falls into this genre; and perhaps the critics would have found the film less shocking, if despite her background, Yi-hwa had accepted money for her sex work.

Metaphorically Yi-hwa is a representative of the bourgeoisie, and awakened to the needs of the proletariat gives that which she can to those in need.

== See also ==
- A Dream of Good Fortune
- Sex Volunteer: Open Secret 1st Story
