= Death Song =

Death Song can refer to:

- "Death Song" or "In Praise of Death", a 1926 song by Korean singer Yun Sim-deok
- +Death Song (film), a 1991 film about Yun Sim-deok, named for the 1926 song
- "The Black Angel's Death Song", a 1967 song by the American band Velvet Underground
- "Death-Song of Conan the Cimmerian", a 1972 poem by American author Lin Carter
- Death Song (album), a 2017 album by The Black Angels
- "Death's Song", a 2013 song by City and Colour from the album The Hurry and the Harm

== See also ==
- Death (disambiguation)#Albums and songs
- Dirge
- Lament
