= Lee Jong-suk filmography =

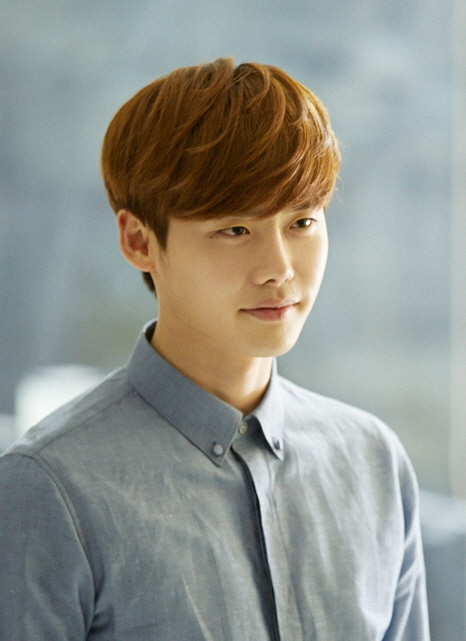
- Film: 9
- Television series: 16
- Web series: 1
- Television show: 1
- Music videos: 5

Lee Jong-suk (Korean: 이종석, born September 14, 1989) is a South Korean actor and model. His breakout role was in School 2013 (2012), and is also well known for his roles in I Can Hear Your Voice (2013), Pinocchio (2014), W (2016), While You Were Sleeping (2017), and Romance Is a Bonus Book (2019).

== Film ==
Year	Title	Role	Notes	Ref.
2005	Sympathy	Lee Han-sol		
2010	Ghost	Baek Hyun-wook		
2012	As One	Choi Kyung-sub		
2012	R2B: Return to Base	First Lieutenant Ji Seok-hyun		
2013	The Face Reader	Kim Jin-hyeong		
2013	No Breathing	Jeong Woo-sang		
2014	Hot Young Bloods	Kang Joong-gil		
2017	V.I.P.	Kim Gwang-il		
2022	The Witch: Part 2. The Other One	Jang	Cameo	
2022	Decibel	Jeon Tae-seong		
2024	The Plot	Colleague	Cameo	

== Television series ==
Year	Title	Role	Notes	Ref.
2010	Prosecutor Princess	Lee Woo-hyun		
2010–2011	Secret Garden	Han Tae-sun		
2011–2012	High Kick: Revenge of the Short Legged	Ahn Jong-suk		
2012	KBS Drama Special – "My Prettiest Moments"	Yoon Jung-hyuk	Drama Special	
2012–2013	School 2013	Go Nam-soon		
2013	I Can Hear Your Voice	Park Soo-ha		
2013	Potato Star 2013QR3	Jong-suk	Cameo (Episode 15)	
2014	Doctor Stranger	Park Hoon		
2014–2015	Pinocchio	Choi Dal-po / Ki Ha-myung		
2016	W	Kang Chul		
2016	Gogh, The Starry Night	Song Dae-ki	Cameo (Episode 5)	
2016	Weightlifting Fairy Kim Bok-joo	Jong-suk	Cameo (Episode 2)	
2017	While You Were Sleeping	Jung Jae-chan		
2018	The Hymn of Death	Kim Woo-jin	Drama Special	
2019	Romance Is a Bonus Book	Cha Eun-ho		
2022	Big Mouth	Park Chang-ho		
2025	Law and the City	Ahn Joo-hyung		
2026	The Remarried Empress	Heinrey		

== Web series ==
Year	Title	Role	Notes	Ref.
2016	7 First Kisses	Lee Jong-suk	Episode 6–7	

== Television shows ==
Year	Title	Role	Notes	Ref.
2012	Inkigayo	MC	June 3 – August 19, 2012; August 26 – December 2, 2012	

== Music video appearances ==
Year	Title	Artist	Ref.
2009	"I Don't Care"	2NE1	
2011	"Don't Play Around"	CHI CHI	
2012	"Lost"	Nicole Jung	
2015	"My Valentine"	Jung Yup	
2016	"Love is"	Davichi	
