= List of South Korean films of 1996 =

A list of films produced in South Korea in 1996:

Title	Director	Cast	Genre	Notes
1996
The Adventures of Mrs. Park	Kim Tae-kyun			
Armageddon	Lee Hyun-se			
Born to Kill	Jang Hyun-su	Jung Woo-sung; Shim Eun-ha		
Change	Lee Jin-seok			
Channel 69	Lee Jung-gook			
Corset	Jung Byung-gak			
Crocodile	Kim Ki-duk	Cho Jae-hyun		
The Day a Pig Fell into the Well	Hong Sang-soo	Kim Eui-sung		
Farewell, My Darling	Park Chul-soo			
Festival	Im Kwon-taek	Ahn Sung-ki		
The Gate of Destiny	Lee Geung-young			
Ghost Mama	Han Ji-seung			
The Gingko Bed	Kang Je-gyu			
Henequen	Kim Ho-sun	Chang Mi-hee	Historical drama	Won best film and best director at the Grand Bell Awards
Jungle Story	Kim Hong-joon			
Kill the Love	Im Jong-jae	Lee Byung-hun; Jeong Seon-kyeong		
Love Story	Bae Chang-ho			
A Petal	Jang Sun-woo	Lee Jung Hyun		
Piano Man	Yoo Sang-wook			
The Rules of a Gangster	Kim Sang-jin			
Seven Reasons Why Beer Is Better Than a Lover	Various			
Their Last Love Affair	Lee Myung-Se			
Three Friends	Yim Soon-rye			
Two Cops 2	Kang Woo-suk			
Wild Animals	Kim Ki-duk	Cho Jae-hyun	Drama	
Yuri	Yang Yun-ho			
