= Seok Rae-myeong =

South Korean film director (1936–2003)

- Born: May 19, 1936; South Korea
- Died: May 20, 2003 (aged 67)
- Occupation: Film director

Korean name
- Hangul: 석래명
- Hanja: 石萊明
- RR: Seok Raemyeong
- MR: Sŏk Raemyŏng

Seok Rae-myeong (May 19, 1936 – May 20, 2003) is a South Korean film director. Seok made his directorial debut with Until Next Time (1972). After the success of his film, Yalkae, a Joker in High School (1977), he directed Mischief's Marching Song (1977), Prankster of Girl's High School (1977) and Our High School Days (1978), leading a boom in teen movies during the late 1970s.

In 2009, Yalkae, a Joker in High School was issued as part of the third series of Korean film stamps by Korea Post, which also included The Road to Sampo, Never Ever Forget Me and Chilsu and Mansu.

== Filmography ==
- Until Next Time (1972)
- Yalkae, a Joker in High School (1977)
- K&J (1977)
- Mischief's Marching Song (1977)
- Prankster of Girl's High School (1977)
- Our High School Days (1978)
- Energy Teacher (1978)
- The Twelve Boarders (1979)
- Under an Umbrella (1979)
- The House Where Sun Rises (1980)
- Don Quixote on Asphalt (1988)
- My Love, Don Quixote (1989)
- Day of Standing Alone (1990)
