= Kim Woo-jin (disambiguation) =

Kim Woojin (born 1997) is a South Korean singer.

Kim Woo-jin may also refer to:

- Kim Woo-jin (archer) (born 1992), South Korean archer
- Kim U-jin (1897–1926), Korean playwright and poet
