= Yun Sim-deok =

Korean singer (1897–1926)

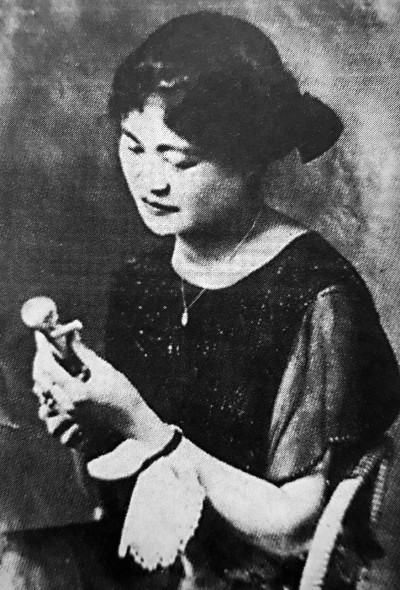

Background information
- Born: Yun Sim-deok; 25 July 1897; Pyongyang, Joseon
- Died: 4 August 1926 (aged 29) Korea Strait
- Occupations: Singer, stage actress
- Years active: 1924–1926

Korean name
- Hangul: 윤심덕
- Hanja: 尹心悳
- RR: Yun Simdeok
- MR: Yun Simdŏk

Art name
- Hangul: 수선
- Hanja: 水仙
- RR: Suseon
- MR: Susŏn

사의 찬미(Hymn of Death)

Yun Sim-deok (Korean: 윤심덕; Hanja: 尹心悳; 25 July 1897 – 4 August 1926) was a Korean singer. She was the country's first professional soprano.

== Life and career ==
Yun was born in Pyongyang in 1897. She studied at the Pyongyang Girls' Middle and High Schools, and graduated from Kyongsong Women's Teaching College in Seoul in 1914. After graduation she became a primary school teacher in Wonju.

After teaching for one year, Yun went to Japan, becoming the first Korean to study at the Tokyo Music School. In Japan, she met and fell in love with a married English literature student, Kim U-jin, with whom she had an affair.

After graduating from music school, Yun returned to Korea, where she debuted as a soprano in 1923. Though audiences were impressed by her powerful voice, she was unable to make a living performing Western classical music, and became a pop singer and actress to support herself.

Yun and Kim U-jin committed suicide together in 1926, jumping off a passenger ship en route from Simonoseki to Busan. The shocking news caused a sensation in Korea, and Yun's 1926 recording of "Hymn of Death" (사의 찬미; also called "Death Song") sold a record 100,000 copies following her death.

== Legacy ==
Yun's most famous recording, 1926's "Hymn of Death," is considered the first "popular" (yuhaeng changga) Korean song. It was recorded in Osaka by the Japanese Nitto recording company, with Yun's sister accompanying her on piano. The song is set to the tune of "Waves of the Danube" by Ion Ivanovici.

Two films have been made about Yun. The first, a 1969 film titled Yun Sim-Deok, was directed by An Hyeon-cheol (안현철) and starred Moon Hee. The second was a 1991 film called Death Song, directed by Kim Ho-sun and starring Chang Mi-hee. The film won numerous awards in South Korea, including Best Film at the 1991 Blue Dragon Film Awards and the 1991 Chunsa Film Art Awards. A television series was also made in 2018 titled The Hymn of Death.

== Gallery ==
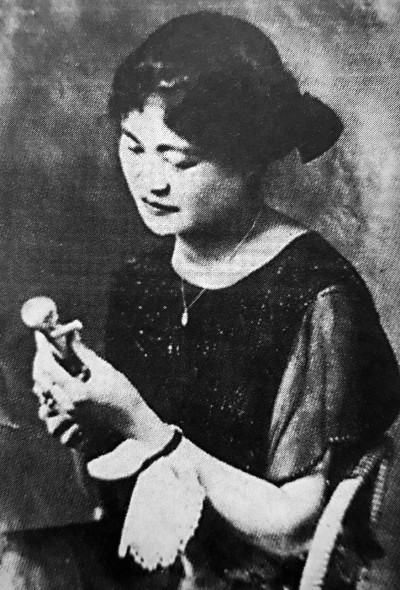

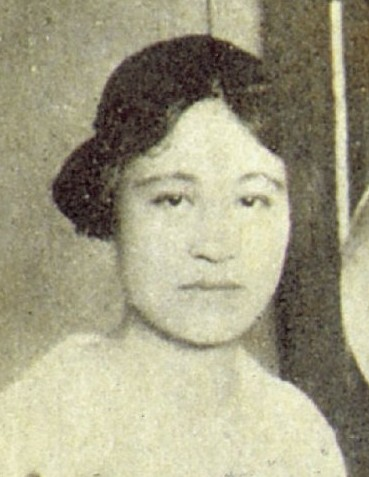

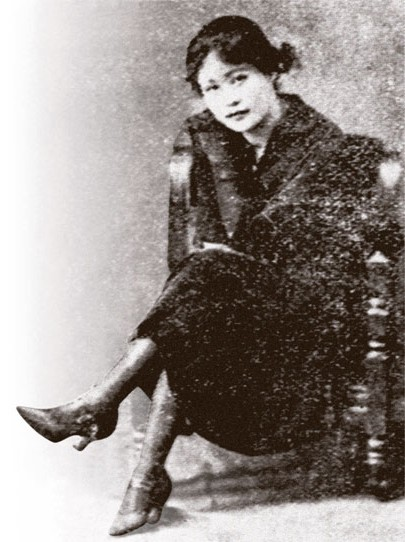

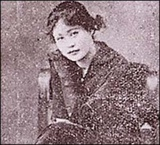

=== Actresses who played Yun Sim-deok ===
- Portrayed by Moon Hee in the 1969 film Yun Sim-Deok.
- Portrayed by Chang Mi-hee in the 1991 film Death Song.
- Portrayed by Shin Hye-sun in the 2018 SBS TV series The Hymn of Death.
