= Coming Back (film) =

- Theatrical poster for Coming Back (1967)
- Hangul: 귀로
- Hanja: 歸路
- RR: Gwiro
- MR: Kwiro
- Directed by: Lee Man-hee
- Written by: Baek Gyeol
- Produced by: Woo Ki-dong
- Starring: Kim Jin-kyu
- Cinematography: Lee Seok-gi
- Edited by: Kim Hui-su
- Music by: Jeon Jeong-geun
- Distributed by: Seki Trading Co.
- Release date: July 27, 1967
- Running time: 90 minutes
- Country: South Korea
- Language: Korean
- Box office: $4,329

Coming Back (Korean: 귀로), also known as Homebound, is a 1967 South Korean romantic drama film directed by Lee Man-hee. It was chosen as Best Film at the Grand Bell Awards.

== Plot ==
A melodrama about the wife of a handicapped war-veteran writer. Their marriage is tested when the wife is tempted by a romance with a younger man.

== Cast ==
- Kim Jin-kyu as Choe Dong-u
- Moon Jung-suk as Ji-yeon
- Jeon Gye-hyeon as Choe I-yeong

== Bibliography ==
- "GWILO". The Complete Index to World Film. Archived from the original on 2012-03-25.
- 귀로. Cine21 (in Korean).

=== Contemporary reviews ===
- August 5, 1967. "「[영화단평] 영육 갈등 여심의 방황, <귀로>」". The Dong-A Ilbo.

Preceded by The Sea Village	Grand Bell Awards for Best Film; 1967	Succeeded by Prince Daewon
