= Elegy of Ren =

- Poster for Elegy of Ren (1969)
- Hangul: 렌의 애가
- Hanja: 렌의 哀歌
- RR: Renui aega
- MR: Renŭi aega
- Directed by: Kim Ki-young
- Written by: Kim Ki-young
- Produced by: Guk Chae-wan
- Starring: Kim Jin-kyu; Kim Ji-mee
- Cinematography: Kim Jae-yeong
- Edited by: Jang Hyeon-su
- Music by: Han Sang-ki
- Distributed by: Seki Trading Co.
- Release date: October 16, 1969
- Running time: 103 minutes
- Country: South Korea
- Language: Korean

Elegy of Ren (Korean: 렌의 애가) is a 1969 South Korean film directed by Kim Ki-young and starring Kim Jin-kyu and Kim Ji-mee.

== Plot ==
The film is a wartime melodrama about an artist and a woman who helps him to paint.

== Cast ==
- Kim Jin-kyu as Simon
- Kim Ji-mee as Ren
- Kim Myeong-jin
- Baek Yeong-min
- Park Am
- Sa Mi-ja as Simon's wife
- Kim Sin-jae
- Ji Bang-yeol
- Kim Se-ra
- Lim Hae-lim

== Bibliography ==
- Ahn, Min-hwa. "Elegy of Ren". The House of Kim Ki-young. Archived from the original on 2004-05-08.
