= Moon Hee =

South Korean former actress (born 1947)

- Born: July 16, 1947 (age 79); Busan, South Korea
- Occupation: Actress
- Years active: 1965–1971

Korean name
- Hangul: 이순임
- RR: I Sunim
- MR: I Sunim

Stage name
- Hangul: 문희
- Hanja: 文姬
- RR: Mun Hui
- MR: Mun Hŭi

Moon Hee (Korean: 문희; born July 16, 1947) is a South Korean former actress. She was born in Busan and has been active since 1965. While attending Seorabeol Art College with a film and theater major, she applied for recruiting new actors by KBS TV. When she was attending for a camera test, Moon was picked up by an assistant director of Lee Man-hee . She was cast to star in Lee's film Heukmaek. She was commonly referred to as one of the "Troika" along with her rival actresses, Yoon Jeong-hee and Nam Jeong-im of the 1960s and early 1970s. Moon Hee retired from the acting career when she married Jang Gang-jae, the vice president of Hankook Ilbo in November 1971 who later became the chair of the newspaper company.

== Filmography ==
*Note; the whole list is referenced.

English title	Korean title	Romanization	Year	Role	Director
Fire for Cleaning Hatred		Ssisgimbul	1973		
On the Road at Night		Bamgil	1972		
A Woman Called 'Daddy'	아빠라 부르는 연인	Appala buleuneun yeo-in	1972		
Flowers and Birds	화조	Hwajo	1971		
Brother and Sister		Gileogi nammae	1971		
A Love Story	어느 사랑의 이야기	Eoneu salang-ui i-yagi	1971		
A Stranger in My Heart	타인이 된 당신	Ta-in-i doen dangsin	1971		
Two Sons		sequel, Du adeul	1971		
The Lost Season		Ilh-eobeolin gyejeol	1971		
30,000 Leagues in Taipei Looking for Mother		Taipei sammanli	1971		
The Story of Chunhyang		Chunhyangjeon	1971		
Once More, For Love	미워도 다시 한번 4	Miwodo Dasi Hanbeon Sa	1971		
Tomorrow's Scenery of Korea		episode 3, Nae-il-ui paldogangsan	1971		
Daughters of the General		Janggun-ui ttaldeul	1971		
Let's Borrow Love	사랑을 빌립시다	Salang-eul billibsida	1971		
Big Shot Bridegroom		Daegamsinlang	1971		
All For Love	미워도 정 때문에	Mi-wodo jeong ttaemun-e	1971		
Kachusa	카추사	Kyachusa	1971		
Please, Leave When I Sleep	잠들면 떠나주오	Jamdeulmyeon tteonaju-o	1971		
Is Your Husband Like This Too?	댁의 아빠도 이렇습니까	Daeg-ui appado ileohseubnikka	1971		
Fresh Love	풋사랑	Pussalang	1971		
Snow Falls on the Bloody Street		Wonhan-ui geoli-e nun-i nalinda	1971		
Loving Only You	사랑은 당신만	Salang-eun dangsinman	1971		
The Crying Bird in Cheongsan	청산에 우는 새야	Cheongsan-e uneun sae-ya	1971		
Bachelor in Trouble		Malsseongnan chonggag	1971		
Darling, I'm Sorry	아내여 미안하다	Anae-yeo mi-anhada	1971		
Until Next Time	미워도 안녕	Mi-wodo annyeong	1971		
Dear Mother	어머님 전상서	Eomeonim jeonsangseo	1971		
Brother	오빠	Oppa	1971		
Mothers of Two Daughters		Du ttal-ui eomeoni	1971		
I'm Your Daughter		Jigeum-eun nam-ijiman	1971		
The Women of Kyeongbokgung		Gyeongboggung-ui yeo-indeul	1971		
I'm Your Family		Na-ege jogeon-eun eobsda	1971		
When Flowers Sadly Fade Away		Seulpeun kkoch-ip-i jil ttae	1971		
Black Rose in Shanghai		Sanghae-ui bulnabi	1971		
An Inner Affair		Naesil samonim	1971		
Three Half-brothers	이복 삼형제	Ibog samhyeongje	1971		
Say Goodbye Like a Man	사나이 멋진 이별	Sana-i meosjin ibyeol	1971		
Little Bridegroom		third episode, Kkomasinlang	1971		
Little Swordsman		Kkomageomgaeg	1970		
Lefty Without a Tomorrow	내일 없는 왼손잡이	Nae-il-eobsneun oensonjab-i	1970		
Sad Palace Court		Bijeon	1970		
Frozen Spring	동춘	Dongchun	1970		
Blue Bedroom		Puleun chimsil	1970		
Little Bridegroom		Kkomasinlang	1970		
Two Bosses with a Grudge		Hanmaejhin teojudaegam	1970		
The Lost Wedding Veil		Ilh-eobeolin myeonsapo	1970		
Underground Women's College		Jiha-yeojadaehag	1970		
A Girl on Myungdong Street	명동 가시내	Myeongdong gasinae	1970		
Farewell My Love Part Three	미워도 다시 한 번 3편	Miwodo Dasi Han Beon Sam-pyeon	1970		
What's Parents?	떠나야 할 사람은	Tteona-yahal salam-eun	1970		
When We Have Hatred	당신이 미워질 때	Dangsin-i mi-wojilttae	1970		
Love Goes With The Leaves	낙엽따라 가버린 사랑	Nag-yeobttala gabeolin salang	1970		
The Bride's Diary		Sinbu-ilgi	1970		
After I Met You	당신을 알고 나서	Dangsin-eul algonaseo	1970		
Father-in-Law		Si-abeoji	1970		
Two Husbands		Du yeobo	1970		
The Rainy Myungdong Street	비내리는 명동거리	Binaelineun Myeongdonggeoli	1970		
Three Odd Ladies		Byeolnan yeoja	1970		
Fair Lady of Tapgol		Tabgol-assi	1970		
Nobody Said Anything		Amumaldo haji anh-assda	1970		
Madame Shell		Solabu-in	1970		
A Bogus President		Ildeungsajang	1970		
Taming of the Shrewd		Cheonha-ilsaeg malgwallyang-i	1970		
Little Bridegroom		the sequel, Kkomasnilang	1970		
Please Turn Off the Light	방에 불을 꺼주오	Bang-e bul-eul kkeoju-o	1970		
Two Wives		Cheo-wa cheo	1970		
If There Were No Parting Again		Ibyeol-eobs-i sal-ass-eumyeon	1970		
Night of Seongbul Temple		Seongbulsaui Bam	1970		
Sad No More		Seulpeum-eul oemyeonhal ttae	1970		
Two Women in the Rain	비에 젖은 두 여인	Bi-e jeoj-eun du yeo-in	1970		
Dangerous Liaison		Wiheomhan gwangye	1970		
Marriage Classroom		Gyeolhongyosil	1970		
Mi-ae	청춘무정	Cheongchunmujeong	1970		
Turn Around at Samgakji		Dol-aganeun Samgagji	1970		
Woman with Long Eyelashes		Sognunseob-i gin yeoja	1970		
The Little Bridegroom's Return		Dol-a-on agisinlang	1970		
Love and Death		Ae-wa sa	1970		
The House of Two Women	두 여인의 집	Du yeo-in-ui jib	1970		
Put Some Clothes On Her		Geu yeoja-ege os-eul ibhyeola	1970		
A Woman in the Wall		II, Byeogsog-ui yeoja	1970		
Odd Bride	별난 새댁	Byeolnan saedaeg	1970		
The Woman Who Said Goodbye in Tears	울고 간 여인	Ulgo gan yeo-in	1970		
All for Love	사랑에 목숨 걸고	Salang-e mogsum geolgo	1970		
A Crape-Myrtle with Morning Dew		Iseulmaj-eun baeg-ilhong	1970		
When a Woman Removes Her Make-up	여자가 화장을 지울 때	Yeojaga hwajang-eul ji-ul ttae	1970		
How Can I Forget		Ij-eul suga iss-eulkka	1970		
Though There Was No Vow		Yagsog-eun eobs-eossjiman	1970		
Men vs. Women		Namdae-yeo	1970		
Does Anyone Know the Woman?		Nuga geu yeo-in-eul moleusina-yo	1970		
Yes, I'll Marry		Sijib-eun ga-yajyo	1970		
Five Brothers	별명을 가진 5형제	Byeolmyeong-eul gajin ohyeongje	1970		
Tears in the Heart		Gaseum-e Maetchin Nunmul	1969		
Rainy Gomoryeong Hill		Binarineun Gomoryeong	1969		
A Lonely Wild Goose		Ulgo Ganeun Oegireogi	1969		
Rebirth		Jaesaeng	1969		
A Letter from an Unknown Woman		Moreuneun Yeoin-ui Pyeonji	1969		
Woman in Apartment	아파트의 여인	Apateu-ui Yeoin	1969		
The Last Letter		Majimak Pyeonji	1969		
Bye Bye Seoul	서울이여 안녕	Seoul-iyeo Annyeong	1969		
Immortal Rivers And Mountains		Mangogangsan	1969		
Calling Out Your Name		Mongmae-eo Bulleobwado	1969		
A Thing Called Love	사랑이라는 것은	Salangiraneun Geoseun	1969		
As Echoes Come Back		Sanulim Childdae Mada	1969		
Empty Heart		Heomuhan Ma-eum	1969		
The Main Room		Naesil	1969		
Leave Your Heart	떠나도 마음만은	Ddeonado Maeummaneun	1969		
Cruel Revenge	피도 눈물도 없다	Pido Nunmuldo Eopda	1969		
A Story of Seoul	서울 야화	Seoul Yahwa	1969		
Endless Love	아무리 사랑해도	Amuri Saranghaedo	1969		
Three Sisters of House Maid	식모 삼형제	Singmo Samhyeongje	1969		
Affection and Love		Jeonggwa Ae	1969		
Housekeeper's Legacy		Singmo-ui Yusan	1969		
A Woman in the Wall		Byeoksok-ui Yeoja	1969		
Lady Hong the Beauty	미녀 홍낭자	Minyeo Hong Nangja	1969		
Sanai U.D.T.	사나이 UDT	Sanai UDT	1969		
Enmity and Affection		Miumboda Jeong-eul	1969		
Always Stranger	언제나 타인	Eonjena Ta-in	1969		
Jealousy and Murder		Charari Nam-iramyeon	1969		
A Far Away Star		Byeol-eun Meol-eodo	1969		
School Excursion	수학여행	Suhagyeohaeng	1969		
Brother	형	Hyeong	1969		
Yun Sim-deok	윤심덕	Yun Sim-deok	1969		
Singer and Daughter		Uljido Motamnida	1969		
Everything of Woman		Yeoja-ui Modeun Geot	1969		
Bitter But Once Again	미워도 다시 한번 2부	Miwodo Dasi Hanbeon I-bu	1969		
Enuch		Naesi	1969		
A Barren Woman		Seongnyeo	1969		
Hiding Tears		Nunmul-eul Gamchugo	1969		
Flower Sandals		Kkot Beoseon	1969		
Tears Behind the Back		Nammolle Heullin Nunmul	1969		
Black Evening Gowns		Geomeun Yahoebok	1969		
Forgotten Woman	잊혀진 여인	Ichyeojin Yeoin	1969		
A Leaving Left-handers	떠나가는 왼손잡이	Ddeonaganeun Oensonjabi	1969		
The Geisha of Korea		Paldo Gisaeng	1968		
Herb of Longing		Sangsacho	1968		
The Gate of Filial Piety	효자문	Hyojamun	1968		
Fight in Gongsan		Gongsanseong-ui Hyeoltu	1968		
Purple Ribbon		Jaju Daenggi	1968		
A Young Zelkova	젊은 느티나무	Jeolmeun Neutinamu	1968		
Scandal	파문	Pamun	1968		
Love	사랑	Sarang	1968		
Woman	여	Yeo	1968		
Crossing the Teary Hill of Bakdaljae		Ulgo Neomneun Bakdaljae	1968		
A Pastoral Song		Mokga	1968		
Rang		Rang	1968		
Stars in My Heart		Byeora Nae Gaseume	1968		
Sword of a Chivalrous Robber		Goedo-ui Geom	1968		
Unfulfilled Love		Motdahan Sarang	1968		
Daughter		Ttal	1968		
Love Me Once Again	미워도 다시 한번	Miwodo Dasi Hanbeon	1968		
Fallen Leaves		Nagyeop	1968		
The Wings of Lee Sang		Lee Sang-ui Nalgae	1968		
The King of a Rock Cave		Amgul Wang	1968		
Autumn Love		Chujeong	1968		
Descendants of Cain		Cain-ui Huye	1968		
Labyrinth	미로	Miro	1968		
Cloisonne Ring		Chilbo Banji	1968		
A Police Note	형사 수첩	Hyeongsa Sucheop	1968		
Grudge	한 2	Han I	1968		
No Grudge After Death	죽어도 한은 없다	Jugeodo Haneun Eopda	1968		
Death Can't Fall Us Apart		Jugeodo Monijeo	1968		
Burning Passions	정염	Jeongyeom	1968		
A Bride on the Second Floor	이층집 새댁	I-Cheungjip Saedaek	1968		
Dreams of Sora		Soraui Ggum	1968		
White Night		Baegya	1968		
Acknowledgement		Nae Moksum Dahadorog	1968		
Trees Stand on Slope	나무들 비탈에 서다	Namudeul Bitare Seoda	1968		
Women's Quarter		Gyubang	1968		
Cloud		Gureum	1968		
Ghost Story		Goedam	1968		
Hometown		Gohyangmujeong	1968		
A Young Bride		Cheolbuji Assi	1968		
Where is He Now?		Jigeum Geu Sarameun	1968		
The Guests of the Last Train		Makcharo On Sonnimdeul	1967		
A King's Command		Eomyeong	1967		
Survive for Me		Nae Mokkkaji Saraju	1967		
Light and Shadow		Bitgwa Geurimja	1967		
Waves	파도	Pado	1967		
A Child Who Was Born in the Year of Liberation	해방동이	Haebangdong-i	1967		
Lingering Attachment	미련	Miryeon	1967		
The King's First Love	임금님의 첫사랑	Imgeumnimui Cheotsarang	1967		
Lost People		Ireobeorin Saramdeul	1967		
Bare-handed Youth	맨주먹 청춘	Maenjumeok Cheongchun	1967		
Nostalgia		Manghyang Cheolli	1967		
The Last Day of the Week		Majimak Yoil	1967		
A Traveling King		Nageune Imgeum	1967		
Lost Migrant	길 잃은 철새	Gil-ireun Cheolsae	1967		
Cheerful Girl		Gibunpa Agassi	1967		
Love Rides the Surf	사랑은 파도를 타고	Sarangeun Padoreul Tago	1967		
A Regret	한	Han	1967		
Others	타인들	Taindeul	1967		
Kong-Jwi Pat-Jwi		Kongjwi patjwi	1967		
The Sun and the Moon		Irwol	1967		
The Way of a Lover		Yeoninui Gil	1967		
A Teacher in an Island		Seommaeul Seonsaeng	1967		
When April Goes by		Sawori Gamyeon	1967		
A Secret Talk		Mireo	1967		
The Starting Point		Wonjeom	1967		
Original Sin		Wonjoe	1967		
A Princess Daughter-in-law		Gongju Myeoneuri	1967		
A Misty Grassland		Angaekkin Chowon	1967		
A Honeymoon		Mirwol	1967		
Yeonhwa	연화	Yeonhwa	1967		
A Full Danger		Wiheomeun Gadeuki	1967		
Traces		Ijojanyeong	1967		
My Days Set in the Twilight	내 청춘 황혼에 지다	Nae Cheongchun Hwanghon-e Jida	1966		
A Nameless Grass		Mumyeongcho	1966		
Starberry Kim		Starberry Gim	1966		
No. 0, the Third Pier		Jesambudu Yeongbeonji	1966		
8240 K.L.O	8240 K.L.O	8240 K.L.O	1966		
Ok-i Makes a Judge Cry		Beopchangeul ulrin ok-i	1966		
Dangerous Youth	위험한 청춘	Wiheomhan Cheongchun	1966		
Black-haired Youth	흑발의 청춘	Heukbarui Cheongchun	1966		
Heukmaek		Heukmaek	1965		

== Awards ==
- 1966, the 5th Grand Bell Awards : New Actress (흑맥)
- 1967, the 3rd Baeksang Arts Awards : New Film Actress
- 1968, the 7th Grand Bell Awards : Best Actress (카인의 후예)
- 1968, the 4th Baeksang Arts Awards : Best Film Acting (막차로 온 손님들)
- 1969, the 6th Blue Dragon Film Awards : Favorite Actress
- 1970, the 6th Baeksang Arts Awards : Favorite Film Actress selected by readers
- 1970, the 7th Blue Dragon Film Awards : Favorite Actress
- 1971, the 7th Baeksang Arts Awards : Favorite Film Actress selected by readers
- 1971, the 8th Blue Dragon Film Awards : Favorite Actress
