= Death Song (film) =

1991 South Korean film directed by Kim Ho-sun

- Theatrical poster for Death Song (1991)
- Hangul: 사의 찬미
- Hanja: 死의 讚美
- RR: Saui chanmi
- MR: Saŭi ch'anmi
- Directed by: Kim Ho-sun
- Written by: Kim Seung
- Produced by: Im Yu-sun
- Starring: Chang Mi-hee
- Cinematography: Lee Seong-chun
- Edited by: Hyeon Dong-chun
- Music by: Shin Byung-ha
- Distributed by: Keuk Dong Screen
- Release date: September 21, 1991
- Running time: 160 minutes
- Country: South Korea
- Language: Korean

Death Song (Korean: 사의 찬미), also known as Praise of Death, is a 1991 South Korean biographical romantic period drama film directed by Kim Ho-sun. It won multiple awards in the 1991 Chunsa Film Art Awards, including Best Film, the 1991 Blue Dragon Film Awards, again including Best Film, and the 1992 Grand Bell Awards.

== Synopsis ==
Yun Sim-deok, is a Korean woman studying singing at Tokyo University during the 1920s, where she falls in love with a married Korean man studying composition. They leave Japan together, returning to Korea by ship. However the closer they come to Korea, the closer they come to being parted; and they throw themselves overboard to be together in death.

== Cast ==
- Chang Mi-hee: Yun Sim-deok
- Kim Sung-min: Kim Woo-jin
- Lee Geung-young: Hong Nan-pa
- Kim Hye-ri: Yun Seong-deok
- Kim Seong-su: Lee Yong-mun
- Cho Seon-mook: Cho Myeong-hee
- Kim Ji-hyeon: Park Jeong-sik
- Jo Min-ki: Hong Hae-seong
- Kang Kye-shik: Woo Jin-bu
- Kim Jin-hwa: Woo Jin-cheo

== Awards ==
Year	Awarding body	Category	Recipient(s)	Result
1991	Blue Dragon Film Awards	Best Film		Won
1991	Blue Dragon Film Awards	Best Leading Actor	Im Sung-min	Won
1991	Blue Dragon Film Awards	Best Leading Actress	Chang Mi-hee	Won
1991	Blue Dragon Film Awards	Best Supporting Actor	Lee Geung-young	Won
1991	Chunsa Film Art Awards	Best Film		Won
1991	Chunsa Film Art Awards	Best Actress	Chang Mi-hee	Won
1991	Chunsa Film Art Awards	Best Supporting Actor	Lee Geung-young	Won
1991	Chunsa Film Art Awards	Best Original Screenplay	Im Yu-sun	Won
1991	Chunsa Film Art Awards	Best Cinematography	Lee Seong-chun	Won
1991	Chunsa Film Art Awards	Best Lighting	Im Jae-young	Won
1991	Chunsa Film Art Awards	Best Editing	Yeo Dong-chin	Won
1991	Chunsa Film Art Awards	Best Art Direction	Jo Yong-san	Won
1991	Chunsa Film Art Awards	Technical Award	Yang Dae-ho	Won
1991	Chunsa Film Art Awards	Best Costume Design	Kim Young-joo, Ha Young-soo, Lee Hae-yoon	Won
1992	Grand Bell Awards	Excellence Award		Won
1992	Grand Bell Awards	Best Director	Kim Ho-sun	Won
1992	Grand Bell Awards	Best Actress	Chang Mi-hee	Won
1992	Grand Bell Awards	Best Supporting Actor	Lee Geung-young	Won
1992	Grand Bell Awards	Screenplay	Im Yu-sun	Won
1992	Grand Bell Awards	Cinematography	Lee Seong-chun	Won
1992	Grand Bell Awards	Sound recording	Kim Kyong-il	Won
1992	Grand Bell Awards	Costume	Kim Young-joo, Ha Young-soo, Lee Hae-yoon	Won
1992	Grand Bell Awards	Special Award	Kim Cheol-seok	Won
1992	Asia-Pacific Film Festival	Best Actress	Chang Mi-hee	Won
1992	Korean Association of Film Critics Awards	Technical Award-Editing	Yeo Dong-chin	Won

== Bibliography ==
=== English ===
- "DEATH SONG". [The Complete Index to World Film].
- "Death song(Sa-ui chanmi)(1991)". Korean Movie Database (KMDb).

=== Korean ===
- 사의 찬미 (in Korean). [www.cine21.com].
- 사의 찬미 (1991) (in Korean). Korean Movie Database (KMDb).

== Television series ==
In 2018, a 3-episode drama titled The Hymn of Death based on the film was produced by SBS.
