= Yalkae, a Joker in High School =

- Film poster
- Hangul: 고교얄개
- RR: Gogyoyalgae
- MR: Kogyoyalgae
- Directed by: Seok Rae-myeong
- Screenplay by: Yoon Sam-yook
- Based on: A Legend of Urchins by Cho Heun-pa
- Produced by: Choi Cun-ji
- Starring: Lee Seung-hyeon; Kim Jeong-hun; Hah Myung-joong
- Cinematography: Jeong Il-seong
- Edited by: Lee Kyeong-ja
- Music by: Choi Chang-kwon
- Production companies: Yun Bang Films Co., Ltd.
- Release date: January 29, 1977
- Running time: 97 minutes
- Country: South Korea
- Language: Korean

Yalkae, a Joker in High School (Korean: 고교얄개; RR: Gogyoyalgae) is a 1977 South Korean comedy film starring Lee Seung-hyeon, Kim Jeong-hun and Hah Myung-joong, and directed by Seok Rae-myeong. It was based on Cho Heun-pa's bestselling novel A Legend of Urchins (Yalgaejeon).

== Plot ==
Na Doo-soo (Lee Seung-hyeon), nicknamed "Yalkae" (an abbreviation of Korean word "얄궂은 개구쟁이(Yalkuteun Gaegujaengi)" meaning "cheeky, cocky person"), is a student who is still in his second year of Christian missionary high school because he failed as a student and acts like a troublemaker. One day Baek Sang-do, a teacher that is the former apprentice of Yalkae's father, arrives to Yalkae's high school as his new teacher. Yalkae, while doing errands for Baek, falls in love with In-sook, a convenient store clerk and student from Moran Girls' High School. He joins a biking club to get closer to In-sook. Meanwhile, the Na family tries to introduce Na Doo-joo, the older sister of Yalkae, to Baek as wife. Baek works as a private tutor for Yalkae while also having a conversation with Na Doo-joo.

Baek discourages In-sook from meeting Yalkae in order to improve his grades. After Yalkae gets called out by a teacher after Kim Ho-cheol tells the teacher that he brought an electric shaver to the school, Yalkae pulls a prank on Kim Ho-cheol, a poor but hard working student, by painting his glasses in red that leads to his glasses being broken. Baek gets furious and decides to abandon Yalkae. However in a teachers meeting he pleads the board to give Yalkae one more chance and saves Yalkae from being expelled from school. Next day Ho-cheol does not go to school and Yalkae goes to his home to find Ho-cheol with a broken leg from a bike accident as the town's milkman because he had no glasses for his poor eyesight.

Feeling guilty, he apologizes to Ho-cheol. Ho-cheol gives a speech to Yalkae about a brighter future. Touched by Ho-cheol's speech, he helps him earn money to buy Kim new glasses and pay off his tuition by delivering milk to earn money. While helping Ho-cheol, his grades also began to improve as he begins to ask questions to help explain homework problems to Ho-cheol. Yalkae hears from Ho-cheol's neighbor that Ho-cheol's leg has worsened and goes to the hospital and gifts him new glasses. After hearing that Ho-cheol may need to get his injured leg amputated, Yalkae does a prayer to hope Ho-cheol doesn't have to undergo the amputation.

While delivering milk, Yalkae gets in an accident with a car. As Yalkae's family and Ho-cheol's older sister goes to the hospital, they find that Yalkae has already left the hospital and went back to delivering milk. When Yalkae visits Ho-cheol at the hospital, he finds out that Ho-cheol did not have to go through the amputation. The story touches high school Principal Hudson and Yalkae's family and friends. Movie ends with a Mr. Baek marrying Doo-joo, with the relationship of Yalkae and In-sook officially acknowledged.

== Cast ==
- Lee Seung-hyeon as Yalkae (Na Doo-soo)
- Kim Jeong-hun as Kim Ho-cheol, Yalkae's Classmate
- Hah Myung-joong as Baek Sang-do, Yalkae's Teacher
- Jeong Yun-hui as Na Doo-joo, Yalkae's Older Sister
- Kang Ju-hee as In-sook, Yalkae's Love Interest
- Jin Woo-young as Yong-ho, Yalkae's Friend

== Sequels and spinoffs ==
The success of the film gave birth to a lot of sequels and spinoffs. High School Champ (1977), Mischief's Marching Song (Yalgaehaengjingog) (1977), and Wild Scoundrels of College (1982) continue the story of the characters from this film. Prankster of Girl's High School (1977) is a spinoff that focuses on the story that happens in a girls' high school after Baek Sang-do arrives as a new teacher for the school. The Scoundrel Rookie (1984) is a spinoff that barely cashes on the Yalkae franchise; it is about a guy who tries to get a job as a girl.

== Box Office ==
The film earned 250,000 viewers when it was first released.

== Legacy ==
In 2009, Korea Post issued Yalkae, a Joker in High School as part of the third series of Korean film stamps, which also included The Road to Sampo, Never Ever Forget Me and Chilsu and Mansu.

Yalkae was released on DVD in South Korea by the Korean Film Archive in 2009.
