= Cho Hae-il =

South Korean writer (1941–2020)

- Born: Cho Hae-ryong; April 18, 1941; Harbin, Manchukuo
- Died: June 19, 2020 (aged 79); South Korea
- Citizenship: South Korean
- Writing career
- Language: Korean

Korean name
- Hangul: 조해룡
- Hanja: 趙海龍
- RR: Jo Haeryong
- MR: Cho Haeryong

Pen name
- Hangul: 조해일
- Hanja: 趙海一
- RR: Jo Haeil
- MR: Cho Haeil

Cho Hae-il (birth name Cho Hae-ryong, 18 April 1941 – 19 June 2020) was a South Korean writer.

== Life ==
Cho Hae-il was born April 18, 1941, in Manchukuo and was originally given the name Haeryong, which means "Sea Dragon". After the liberation of Korea his family returned to Seoul, and five years later the Korean War began. During the war his family joined the stream of refugees who retreated to Busan, only returning to Seoul in 1954 after the cessation of hostilities. Cho entered Posung High School where, by his own admission, he had "the lowest scholastic achievements". At this school he entered the creative writing club. In 1960 he lived through the student revolution of April 19, about which he said made him very proud for the achievements of others and very shamed for his own failure to participate.

In 1961 he entered Kyunghee University, where he majored in Korean literature and met Hwang Sunwon, one of the greatest senior writers in Korea. Graduating in 1966, he served his mandatory military service in various roles. Upon his discharge from the service, he began writing. When his writing career began to wind down in the late 80s, Cho moved to teaching creative writing at Kyunghee University. He married in 1972 and has one son.

== Work ==
Cho made his literary debut with The Man Who Dies Every Day, which won first prize in the JoongAng Ilbo spring literary contest in 1970. Over the next few years Cho was quite prolific, publishing at least twelve short stories and the novella America between his first work and 1974. In 1976 Cho published The Winter Woman, which went on to achieve massive success and made Cho a popular writer, though he believed his fame to be undeserved. From 1974 to 1986, Cho wrote steadily, both short stories and newspaper serials.

Cho's work often focuses on the weaknesses of individuals and societies. His America (in English) tells the story of a man and local society deformed by the presence of U.S. troops in South Korea. His short story The Iron Mask tells the story of a couple attacked, and the wife beaten, while The Psychologists explores the dynamics of violence in the confines of a bus.

== Selected works ==
- Kyŏul yŏja (1975) - serialized in The Chosun Ilbo
- Uyoil (1977) - collection
- Jibongwiui namja (1979) - serialized in the Seoul Shinmun
- Eksŭ (1982) - serialized in The Dong-a Ilbo
- Kalsu ŏmnŭn nara (1984) - serialized in JoongAng Ilbo
- Im Kkŏk-chŏng e kwanhan ilgopkae ŭi iyagi (1986)
- Amerikʻa (1990)

== Media based on publications ==
- Wangshibri (1976)
- Winter Woman (1977), based on Kyŏul yŏja
- Jibongwiui namja (1979), based on Jibongwiui namja
- Wooyoil (1980), based on Uyoil
- X (1983), based on Eksu
- PpilKu (1997)
