= Descendants of Cain (film) =

- Poster for Descendants of Cain (1968)
- Hangul: 카인의 후예
- Hanja: 카인의 後裔
- RR: Kainui huye
- MR: K'ainŭi huye
- Directed by: Yu Hyun-mok
- Written by: Lee Sang-hyun; Hwang Su-won
- Produced by: Seong Dong-ho
- Starring: Kim Jin-kyu; Moon Hee
- Cinematography: Lee Seok-chul
- Edited by: Ree Kyoung-ja
- Music by: Kim Dong-jin
- Distributed by: Dong Yang Films Co., Ltd.
- Release date: June 1, 1968
- Running time: 107 minutes
- Country: South Korea
- Language: Korean

Descendants of Cain (Korean: 카인의 후예) is a 1968 South Korean drama film directed by Yu Hyun-mok.

== Plot ==
An anti-communist film depicting North Koreans extorting the land and property of civilians in the name of revolution after the liberation from Japan in 1945.

== Cast ==
- Kim Jin-kyu as Pak Hun
- Moon Hee as O Jang-nyeo
- Park No-sik as Do-seop
- Jang Dong-he
- Jeong Min
- Choe Bong
- Yang Hun
- Jang hoon
- Kim Chil-seong
- Seong So-min

== Awards ==
At the Blue Dragon Film Awards in 1968, it won the award for Best Film. The film was also selected as the South Korean entry for the Best Foreign Language Film at the 41st Academy Awards, but was not accepted as a nominee.

== See also ==
- List of submissions to the 41st Academy Awards for Best Foreign Language Film
- List of South Korean submissions for the Academy Award for Best Foreign Language Film
