= The Road to Sampo =

- Poster for The Road to Sampo (1975)
- Directed by: Lee Man-hee
- Screenplay by: Yoo Dong-hun
- Story by: Hwang Sok-yong
- Produced by: Joo Dong-jin
- Starring: Baek Il-seob; Kim Jin-kyu; Moon Sook
- Cinematography: Kim Deok-jin
- Edited by: Jang Hyeon-su
- Music by: Choi Chang-kwon
- Production companies: Yun Bang Films Co., Ltd.
- Release date: May 23, 1975
- Running time: 95 minutes
- Country: South Korea
- Language: Korean

The Road to Sampo (Korean: 삼포가는 길; RR: Sampoganeun gil) is a 1975 South Korean drama film starring Baek Il-seob, Kim Jin-kyu and Mun Suk. The final and posthumous work of director Lee Man-hee, it is adapted from an original short story of the same name by Hwang Sok-yong.

Lee collapsed during the editing phase of the film. He was admitted to a hospital and soon died. According to Baek Kyeol, a screenwriter, Lee's health was already at its worst when he took on the project, and he may have known that he might not live to see the film's completion.

== Plot ==
With little money left and no work during winter, Roh Young-dal (Baek Il-seob), a young construction worker is at a loss where to go when he meets a middle-aged man named Jeong (Kim Jin-kyu) who is on his way back to his hometown. Jeong gets by doing odd jobs using skills he learned while serving time in prison. After more than ten years' absence, he is homesick and dreams of his hometown, Sampo, where he can fish in the sea and tend his crops.

Young-dal and Jeong meet Baek-hwa (Mun Suk), a runaway waitress at a restaurant in town and the three of them begin their journey together. At first, Young-dal and Baek-hwa argue constantly but soon become attached to each other. As they continue their travel to the train station, each reminisces about his or her past.

At the train station, Young-dal buys Baek-hwa a ticket for her onward journey, hinting at a farewell. He and Jeong then depart for Sampo. After finding a job, Young-dal leaves Jeong. When Jeong finally arrives in Sampo, he is shocked to see how his hometown has changed.

== Cast ==
- Baek Il-seob as Roh Young-dal
- Kim Jin-kyu as Jeong
- Moon Sook as Baek-hwa
- Kim Ki-bum
- Kim Yong-hak
- Sok In-soo
- Seok Myeong-sun
- Jang In-han
- Choe Jae-ho

== Awards and nominations ==
Year	Award	Category	Recipient	Result
1975	14th Grand Bell Awards	Best Film	The Road to Sampo	Won
1975	14th Grand Bell Awards	Best Director	Lee Man-hee	Won
1975	14th Grand Bell Awards	Best Supporting Actor	Kim Jin-kyu	Won
1975	14th Grand Bell Awards	Best New Actress	Moon Sook	Won

== Korean film stamps ==
In 2009, Korea Post issued The Road to Sampo as part of the third series of Korean film stamps, which also included Yalkae, a Joker in High School, Never Ever Forget Me and Chilsu and Mansu.
