= Park No-sik =

South Korean actor (1930–1995)

Park Noh-sik
- Born: February 4, 1930; Suncheon, Zenranan-dō, Korea, Empire of Japan
- Died: April 3, 1995 (aged 65)
- Occupation: Actor
- Years active: 1956–1991
- Family: Park Jun-gyu (son)

Korean name
- Hangul: 박노식
- Hanja: 朴魯植
- RR: Bak Nosik
- MR: Pak Nosik

Park Noh-sik (Korean: 박노식; February 4, 1930 – April 3, 1995) was a South Korean actor. Park was born in Suncheon, Zenranan-dō, Korea, Empire of Japan in 1930. Park graduated from Suncheon School of Education. Park debuted as an actor in 1956 by starring in Gyeoktoe (격퇴) directed by Lee Gang-cheon. Park had starred in over 900 films and established his career as an action film star. In the 1970s, Park started directing.

== Filmography ==
*Note; the whole list is referenced.

Year	English title	Korean title	Romanization	Role	Director
	As You Please		Ne meosdaelo hae-la		
	The Spring of Weeds		Jabchodeul-ui bom		
	The Chameleon's Poem		Kamael-leon-ui si		
	Setting Sun		Nagjo		
	A Night Guard, Yong-Pal		Bangbeomdae-won Yongpal-i		
	A Madwoman		Gwangnyeo		
	A Life		Ilsaeng		
	Why?		Wae?		
	The Witness in the Dark		Eodumsog-ui moggyeogja		
	Silver Beard		Ha-yan su-yeom		
	A Match		Seungbu		
	5 White Flowers		5 baekhwa		
	The Wolves		Neugdaedeul		
	The Military Academy		Yuggunsagwanhaggyo		
	Three Days of Their Reign		Sam-ilcheonha		
	Obaekhwa		Obaeghwa		
	Weeds		Jabcho		
	Yong Ku and Yong Pal Yi		Yonggu-wa Yongpal-i		
	Suspended Sentence		Jibhaeng-yu-ye		
	Baettaragi		Baettalagi		
	A Badge of a Man		Sana-i hunjang		
	Leaving Myeong Dong		Myeongdong-eul tteonamyeonseo		
	Friendship		Ujeong		
	A Warrant for an Arrest		Chepolyeong		
	Zip Up		Jyagkeuleul chae-wola		
	Looking for Sons and Daughters		Adeul ttal chaj-a cheonligil		
	The Way for Man		Sana-i ganeun gil-e		
	An Honorable Student of Life		Insaeng-udeungsaeng		
	Japanese Pirate		Ilbonhaejeog		
	My Love of the South and the North		Namgwa bug-ui dangsin		
	Our Land of Korea		Uli-ui paldogangsan		
	[LHatred Becomes...		Mi-um-i byeonha-yeo		
	Voices		Mogsoli		
	Bang-ja and Hyang Dan-yi		Bangja-wa Hyangdan-i		
	Oh, Frailty		Yaghanja-yeo		
	An Jung-Geun, the Patriot		Uisa An Junggeun		
	One to One		Ildae-il		
	A Cattle Seller		Sojangsu		
	Cruel History of Myeong Dong		Myeongdongjanhogsa		
	Ever Smiling Mr. Park		Usgo saneun Bakseobang		
	30 Years of Love		Yujeongsamsibnyeon		
	A Court Lady		Gungnyeo		
	My Mome Where I Can Never Go Back		Dol-agal su eobsneun gohyang		
	Daughters-In-Law		Myeoneuli		
	A Family Tree		Jogbo		
	The Outraged Man		Babogat-eun sana-i		
	Madame at 54th Street		54beonga-ui madam		
	Today's Men		Hyeondae-in		
	The Man in Red Scarf		Ppalgan mahula-ui sana-i		
	Aboard the Ship		Hweliholeul tala		
	I		Na		
	Five Daggers		Daseosgae-ui dangeom		
	Pent Up with Love		Gaseum-i teojidolog		
	The Tiger in Tokyo		Donggyeong-ui holang-i		
	Twelve Guys in Myeongdong		Myeongdong-e yeoldu sana-i		
	Action Episodes		Hwalgeugdaesa		
	Big Brother, Yong-Chil		Yongchil-ihyeongnim		
	Newly-Employed Yong-Pal		Sin-ibsa-won Yongpal-i		
	Five Fighters		5in-ui geondaldeul		
	A Sudden Calamity		Nalbyeolag		
	Time on Myungdong		Myeongdong-e heuleuneun se-wol		
	A Lefthander on the Dock		Hanggu-ui oensonjab-i		
	Forty Steps of Revenge		Wonhan-ui 40gyedan		
	Hong Kong Blues		Hongkong buleuseu		
	I'm a Man on Myungdong		Myeongdongsana-i ttalo issdeonya		
	Iron Man from Hong Kong		Hongkong-eseo on cheol-inbag		
	Snow Falls on the Bloody Street		Wonhan-ui geoli-e nun-i nalinda		
	Two Guys		Du namja		
	A Student of Life		Insaeng-yuhagsaeng		
	Yong-Pal in Deep Trouble		Wigi-ilbal Yongpal-i		
	It Rains on the Heart of a Man		Sana-i gaseum-e biga naelinda		
	Sad Neon Lights		Mujeong-ui ne-onga		
	Number One in the Country		Hangug je-il-ui sana-i		
	Tomorrow's Scenery of Korea		Nae-il-ui paldogangsan		
	Find the 72 Karat Diamond		72K da-i-yaleul chaj-ala		
	Yong-Pal, the Driver		Unjeonsu Yongpal-i		
	Dark Glasses		Gem-eun angyeong		
	A Bout in 30 Years		30nyeonman-ui daegyeol		
	The Graduation from Myeongdong		Myeongdongjol-eobsaeng		
	Sergeant Kim's Return from Vietnam		Wolnam-eseo dol-a-on Gimsangsa		
	War and Human Being		Jeonjaenggwa ingan		
	Jijiharu's Black Sun		Jijihalu-ui heugtae-yang		
	Saturday Afternoon		To-yo-il-ohu		
	Myeongdong Fella, Nampodong Fella		Myeongdongsana-i-wa Nampodongsana-i		
	Scamp in Hanyang		Han-yanggeondal		
	Love in the Snowfield		Seol-won-ui jeong		
	With Bare Fists		Maenjumeog-eulo wassda		
	Five Brothers		Byeolmyeong-eul gajin ohyeongje		
	Old Gentleman in Myeongdong		Myeongdongnosinsa		
	The Story of Yong-pal		Yeogjeonchulsin Yongpal-i		
	Count of Myungdong		Myeongdongbaegjag		
	The Revengeful Man		Wonhan-ui paldosana-i		
	The Harbor Man Returns		Dol-a-on hanggu-ui sana-i		
	Walking Barefoot		Maenballo wassda		
	My Seoul]L		Mujagjeong sanggyeong		
	Dolsoi, a Man of Loyalty		Uili-ui sana-i Dolsoe		
	A Man Who Arrived by Night Train		Bamchalo on sana-i		
	The Story of Warriors		Suhoji		
	Madame Jang from Hong Kong		Honkong-eseo on madamJang		
	Yong-pal, A King of Namdaemoon Area		Namdaemunchulsin Yongpal-i		
	The Javelin Killer in the Wild		Gwang-ya-ui pyochangjab-i		
	The Sun Never Gets Old		Tae-yang-eun neulgji anhneunda		
	Wailing Love		Salang-a naneun tonggoghanda		
	Girls from Eight Provinces		Paldogasina-i		
	Revengeful Sam-dol		Wonhanmaejhin Samdol-i		
	Housemaids from Eight Provinces		Paldosigmo		
	Heartless on Harbor		Hanggumujeong		
	Swordsmen from Eight Provinces		Paldogeomgaeg		
	A Seaman in Hong Kong		Hongkong-ui madoloseu		
	One-eyed Park		Aekkunun Bak		
	With or Without Love		Yujeongmujeong		
	Army Unit 124		Il-isa gunbudae		
	Wang and Pak on Myeongdong Street		Myeongdong-ui Wanggwa Bak		
	Born in Nampo-dong		Nampodong chulsin		
	Operation Tokyo Expo '70		Egseupo chilsib Donggyeongjeonseon		
	Seoul is Not That Nice		Seo-ul-i johdajiman		
	Myengdong Blues		Myeogdong buleuseu		
	The Return of the Wanderer		Dol-a-on banglangja		
	Back Alley No. 5		Dwisgolmog obeonji		
	One-armed Master of the Wild		Hwang-ya-ui woepal-i		
	Man and Woman from Hong Kong		Hongkong-eseo on yeo-wa nam		
	[LMan with a Reputation		Somunnan namja		
	Forgotten Woman		Ichyeojin Yeoin		
	The Best Korean Man		Hanguk Jeil-ui Sanai		
	Ruler of the Underworld		Amheug-ga-ui Jibaeja		
	In Your Arms		Jug-eodo Geudae Pume		
	A Glorious Operation		Gyeolsa Daejakjeon		
	The Man of the Man		Sanai Jung Sanai		
	Black Pearl		Heugjinju		
	The Third Zone		Jesamjidae		
	Sons-in-Law		Paldo Sa-wi		
	Gallant Man		Paldo Sanai		
	Chaser		Chugyeogja		
	Hong Gil-dong		Uijeog Hong Gil-dong		
	Jang Nok-Su		Yohwa Jang Nok-su		
	Shanghai of Fog		Angaekkin Sanghae		
	Temporary Government in Shanghai		Sanghae Imsi Jeongbu Wa Kim Gu Seonsaeng		
	A Blues of a Man		Sanai Bureuseu		
	A Native of Myeong-dong		Myeong-dong Chulsin		
	Nagyo Bridge		Nagyo		
	Jin and Min		Jug-eodo Joa		
	Jumper Q		Jamba Kyu		
	Evil Person		Main		
	Sky and Star		Haneul-eul Bogo Byeol-eul Ttago		
	The Night of Full Moon		Siboya		
	Yeojin Tribe		Yeojinjog		
	Heartless Sword		Mujeonggeom		
	Visit of Spy		Jigeumeun Jugeul Ttaega Anida		
	Sanai U.D.T.		Sanai UDT		
	The Last Left-hander		Majimak Oensonjabi		
	Pallid Sword		Baek-myeon-geom-gwi		
	Sword		Pilsal-ui Geom		
	Blues at Midnight		Yeongsi-ui bureuseu		
	A Returned Man of Korea		Doraon Paldo Sanai		
	Twin Dragon Sword		Ssangyong-geom		
	Shanghai Blues		Shanghai Bureuseu		
	An Agile Tiger		Biho		
	Sahwasan Mountain		Sahwasa		
	The World of Men		Sanai-ui Segye		
	Eagle of Wild Field		Hwang-ya-ui Dogsuri		
	White Rose		Baekjangmi		
	Rainy Gomoryeong Hill		Binarineun Gomoryeong		
	Youth Gone in Void; Mother's Balloon		Heogong-e Jin Cheongchun; Eomma-ui Pungseon		
	Trial		Simpan		
	Arirang		Airang		
	Descendants of Cain		Cain-ui Huye		
	Potato		Gamja		
	Outing		Oechul		
	The Eternal Motherhood				
	Bell of Emile		Emile Jong		
	Pure Love		Sunjeongsanha		
	Sun-deok		Sundeogi		
	The Land of Korea		Paldo-gangsan		
	Scared of Night		Bameun Museoweo		
	Eunuch		Naesi		
	Winds and Clouds		Pung-un; Imran Yahwa		
	A Police Note		Hyeongsa Sucheop		
	The Grudge		Han		
	The Third Zone		Jesam jidae		
	The Sword of a Shooting Star		Yuseong-ui Geom		
	A Wondering Swordsman		Yurang-ui Geom-ho		
	A Wandering Swordsman and 108 Bars of Gold		Nageune Geomgaek Hwanggeum 108 Gwan		
	A Man of Great Strength: Im Ggyeok-jeong		Cheonha Jangsa, Im Ggyeok-jeong		
	Chunhyang		Chunhyang		
	Lady in Dream		Mongnyeo		
	Returned Left-handed Man		Doraon Oensonjabi		
	Bell Daegam		Bang-ul Daegam		
	Shaded Love		Geuneuljin Sunjeong		
	Fight in Gongsan		Gongsanseong-ui Hyeoltu		
	Going Well		Jal Doegamnida		
	A Gaze		Euddeon Nunmangul		
	The Crossroads of Hell		Jiogui Sipjaro		
	A Wonderer		Pungranggaek		
	The Son of the General		Daejwaui Adeul		
1968	Revenge		Boksu		
	Secret Mission of Seven People		Chil-inui Milsa		
	The King of a Rock Cave		Amgul Wang		
	Dangerous Blues		Sarin Bureus		
	Sam-hyeon-yuk-gak		Sam-hyeon-yuk-gak		
	Do Not Tempt Me		Yuhokaji Mara		
	Phantom Queen		Dajeongbulsim		
	Street N. 66		66beongaui Hyeolyeon		
	A Cold-heartedness		Bijeong		
	When Bucketwheet Flowers Blossom		Memilkkot Pil Muryeop		
	The Sun And the Moon		Irwol		
	The Japanese Emperor And the Martyr		Ilboncheonhwanggwa Poktanuisa		
	Legend of Ssarigol		Ssarigorui Sinhwa		
	Destiny		Sungmyeong		
	The Princess Cheolseon		Cheolseongongju		
	A Man with Scars		Sangcheoppunin Sanai		
	Full Ship		Manseon		
	Mounted Bandits		Majeok		
	A Secret Royal Inspector		Amhaeng-eosa		
	History of the Three States		Pung-un Samgukji		
	A Deviation		Talseon		
	A Brother and Sister		Nammae		
	Hometown		Gohyang		
	Accusation		Gobal		
	The Queen of Elegy		Ellejiui Yeowang		
	Six Daughters		The Land of Korea/Paldogangsan		
	Breakthrough in Shanghai		Yeongbeon Sanghaedolpa		
	A Heavenly Peach Flower		Cheondohwa		
	Injo Restoration		Injobanjeong		
	A Girl Rowdy		Nangja Mangnani		
	Horror of Triangle		Samgagui Gongpo		
	Her White Mourning Dress		Sobok		
	A Queen Wasp		Yeowangbeol		
	A Public Cemetery of Wol-ha		Wolhaui Gongdongmyoji		
	Journey to the West		Seoyugi		
	Secret 88		Bimiljeongbo Palsibpalbeonji		
	Hun's		Dongdaemun Sijang Huni Eomma		
	A Rescue Order		Talchul Myeongryeong		
	Betrayal		Banyeok		
	Buy My Fist		Nae Jumeogeul Sara		
	Wanna Be with You		Geudae Yeope Garyeonda		
	Fighters on a Wide Plain		Gwan-gya-ui Gyeolsadae		
	A Seoul Boy		Seoul meoseuma		
	Bitter Daedong River		Hanmaneun Daedonggang		
	Lady Suk		Sukbuin		
	A Tear-Soaked Crown		Nunmul Jeojeun Wanggwan		
	SOS Hong Kong		SOS Hong Kong		
	A Lucky Adventurer		Daejiui Punguna		
	Black Thief		Heukdojeok		
	I Am a Traitor		Naneun maegukno		
	Starberry Kim		Starberry Gim		
	A Crosspatch		Simsul Gakha		
	55 Street Shanghai		Sanghai Osip-obeonji		
	You Are Aimed		Neoreul Norigo Itda /		
	Betrayer Shanghai Park		Baebanja Sanghai Park		
	The Great Sokgulam Cave Temple		Dae Seoggul-am		
	The Girl at the Ferry Point		Naruteo Cheonyeo		
	Behold with an Angry Face		Seongnan Eolgullo Dol-abora		
	The Castle of Chastity		Jeongjoseong		
	To the End of the World		I sesang Kkeutkkaji		
	The Same Starlight on this Land		I ttang-edo Jeo Byeolbicheul		
	The Dangerous Reward		Wiheomhan Bosu		
	Courage is Alive		Yongsaneun Sara Itda		
	Mother's Heyday		Eomeoni-ui Cheongchun		
	Speak, the Yalu River		Aprokgang-a Malhara		
	Dad, Please Return Home		Appa Dorawayo		
	The Double Rainbow Hill		Ssangmujigae Tteuneun Eondeok		
	Hwalbindang		Hwalbindang		
	A Hong Kong Left-handed		Hongkong-ui Oensonjabi		
	The Cash is Mine		Hyeongeum-eun Nae Geot-ida		
	The Messengers to Hamheung		Hamheungchasa		
	Blood-soaked Mountain Guwol		Pi-eorin Gu-wolsan		
	Lee Seong-gye King Taejo		Taejo Lee Seonggye		
	The Sino-Japanese War and Queen Min the Heroine		Cheong-iljeonjaenggwa yeogeol Minbi		
	The Song of Cheongsan		cheongsanbyeolgok		
	The Man's Life		Nam-a-ilsaeng		
	The Fugitive		Domangja		
	The Girl Raised as a Future Daughter-in-law		Minmyeoneuri		
	The Myth-Making Marine		Sinhwareul Namgin Haebyeong		
	A Female Spy, Elisa		Yeogancheop Elisa		
	The Milestone		Ijeongpyo		
	Take a Course to the South		Gisureul Namjjok-euro Dollyeora		
	Deaf Samryongi		Beongeori Samryongi		
	The Housemaid		Singmo		
	Prince Suyang and Mt. Baekdu		Suyanggwa Baekdusan		
	The Beauty and the Robber		Minyeo-wa Dojeok		
	Myohyang's Elegy		Myohyangbigok		
	The Port Sea Gulls Sing a Song		Galmaegi Uneun Hanggu		
	Seaman Park		Madoroseu Park		
	I Have Been Cheated		Naneun Sogatda		
	No Way to Go Ahead		Nagal Gili Eopda		
	Where Can I Stand?		Naega Seol Ttang-eun Eodinya		
	Sakyamuni Buddha		Seokgamoni		
	The Passion in the Cave		Donggulsogui Aeyok		
	The Intimidator		Hyeopbakja		
	The Women Divers		Haeyeo		
	I Cannot Die As It Is		Idaero Juk-eulsu Eopda		
	The Yangtze River		Yangjagang		
	The Panmunjeom Truce Village		Panmunjeom		
	The Chaser		Chugyeokja		
	The Ferryboat is Leaving		Yeonnakseoneun Tteonanda		
	Please Be Careful with the Young Lady!		Agassireul Josimhaseyo		
	Only for You		Dangsinman-eul Wiha-yeo		
	Genghis Khan		Gwang-ya-ui Wangja Dae Genghis Khan		
	The Heaven and the Hell		Cheongukkwa Ji-ok		
	Kim's Daughters		Gimyakguk-ui Ttaldeul		
	With All My Heart		Naema-eum Bachiri		
	The Conqueror		Jeongbokja		
	The Ruffians		Bulhandang		
	A Bridegroom from a Grave		Mudeomeseo Na-on Sillang		
	When Black Flowers Fade		Geomeun Kkonnipi Jilttae		
	Black Gloves		Geomeun Janggab		
	Shanghai Riru		Sanghae Riru		
	The Twelve Nyang Life		Yeoldunyangjjari Insaeng		
	Cheongwannyeo		Cheongwannyeo		
	Soldiers of YMS504		YMS 504-ui Subyeong		
	The Wandering Troupe		Yurang Geugjang		
	Good and Better		Ttwineun Nom Wi-e Naneun Nom		
	A Black Discontinuous Line		Geomeun Buryeonsokseon		
	Aeran		Aeran		
	The Sea is Silent		Badaneun Mari Eopda		
	Eight Hours of Horror		Gongpo-ui Yeodeolsigan		
	A Mother		Choribdong		
	12 Fighters		Sibi-inui Yado		
	A New Recruit, Mr. Lee		Sinibsawon Mr. Lee		
	King Dongmyeong		Sarang-ui Dongmyeong-wang		
	Call 112		112reul Dollyeora		
	Where Love and Death Meet		Sarang-gwa Jugeum-ui Haehyeob		
	The Gate to Hell		Ji-okmun		
	Qin Shu Huangdi and the Great Wall of China		Jinsihwangje-wa Mallijangseong		
	Sorrow is Mine		Seulpeumeun Naegeman		
	Farewell Tumen River		Dumangang-a Jal Itgeora		
	Queen Dowager Inmok		Inmok Daebi		
	The Sea Knows		Hyeonhaetaneun Algo Itda		
	Lim Kkeok-jeong		Lim Kkeok-jeong		
	Five Marines		O in-ui haebyeong		
	A Bonanza		Nodaji		
	At the Dawn		Meondong-i Tteul Ttae		
	Lady Jang		Janghuibin		
	Chastity		Jeongjo		
	Wails of the Night		Bameun Tonggokhanda		
	Ondal the Fool and Princess Pyeong-Gang		Babo Ondal-gwa Pyeonggang Gongju		
	Wanted		Hyeonsangbuteun Sanai		
	When Love is Flowering and Fading		Sarang-i pigojideon nal		
	A Sunny Field		Haesbich ssod-ajineun beolpan		
	Your Voice		Geudae mogsori		
	A Bloody Fight		Pimud-eun daegyeol		
	A Pearl Tower		Jinjutab		
	Don't Ask About My Past		Gwageoreul Mutji Maseyo		
	A Blooming Season		Kkotpineun Sijeol		
	Today and Tomorrow		Oneuldo Naeildo		
	A Real-estate Agent for Life		Insaengbogdeogbang		
	My Love to You		Nae Sarang Geudaeege		
	Madam		Samonim		
	Before a Love is Gone		Sarangi Gagi Jeone		
	Life Theater		Insaenggeukjang		
	A White Pearl		Baekjinju		
	Sunshine Again		Dasi Chajeun Yangji		
	Independence Association and young Lee Seung-Man		Dongniphyeophoewa Cheongnyeon Lee Seung-man		
	Dreaming Again		Kkumiyeo Dasi Hanbeon		
	The Life of a Flower		Kkotdo saengmyeong-i itdamyeon		
	The Tears		Nunmul		
	The Mother and Daughter		Monyeo		
	Mother's Way		Eomeoni-ui gil		
	The Fallen Leaves		Nag-yeob		
	Brother and Sister		Du nammae		
	The Hill with a Zelkova Tree		Neutinamu inneun eondeog		
	The Sorrow of a Wanderer		Nagne seol-um		
	The Great Story of Chun-Hyang		DaeChunhyangjeon		
	I Don't Like You		Naneun neoleul silh-eohanda		
	Fight Back		Gyeogtoe		

=== Director ===
Year	English title	Korean title	Romanization	Role	Director
	Yong-pal Has Returned		Dol-a-on yongpal-i		
	A Night Guard, Yong-Pal		Bangbeomdae-won Yongpal-i		
	Devil ! Take The Train To Hell.		Ag-in-i-yeo ji-oghaeng yeolchaleul tala		
	No Violence		Poglyeog-eun eobsda		
	A Madwoman		Gwangnyeo		
	Silver beard		Ha-yan su-yeom		
	Why?		Wae?		
	A Life		Ilsaeng		
	The military academy		Yuggunsagwanhaggyo		
	Suspended Sentence		Jibhaeng-yu-ye		
	Zip up		Jyagkeuleul chae-wola		
	Jeep		Jipeu		
	I		Na		
	Quit Your Life		Ingansapyoleul sseola		

== Awards ==
- 1963, the 2nd Grand Bell Awards : Best Supporting Actor for (진시황제와 만리장성)
- 1965, the 3rd Blue Dragon Film Awards : Best Supporting Actor for (용사는 살아 있다)
- 1965, the 4th Grand Bell Awards : Best Supporting Actor for (청일전쟁과 여걸 민비)
- 1967, the 6th Grand Bell Awards : Best Actor for (고발)
- 1968, the 7th Grand Bell Awards : Best Supporting Actor for (카인의 후예)
- 1969, the 6th Blue Dragon Film Awards : Best Supporting Actor for (카인의 후예)
- 1970, the 7th Blue Dragon Film Awards : Best Actor for (돌아온 팔도사나이)
- 1972, the 9th Blue Dragon Film Awards : Best Actor for (소장수)
- 1972, the 9th Blue Dragon Film Awards : Favorite Actor
- 1973, the 10th Blue Dragon Film Awards : Favorite Actor
