= Woman (1968 film) =

- Theatrical poster
- Hangul: 여
- Hanja: 女
- RR: Yeo
- MR: Yŏ
- Directed by: Kim Ki-young; Jung Jin-woo; Yu Hyun-mok
- Written by: Lee Eun-seong; Kim Seung-ok; Kim Ki-young
- Produced by: Park Gwan-sik
- Starring: Shin Seong-il; Moon Hee
- Cinematography: Jang Seok-jun; Son Hyeon-chae; Choe Ho-jin
- Edited by: Kim Hee-su
- Music by: Han Sang-ki
- Distributed by: Korea Art Movie Co., Ltd.
- Release date: December 23, 1968
- Running time: 100 minutes
- Country: South Korea
- Language: Korean

Woman (Korean: 여) is a 1968 three-part South Korean film directed by Kim Ki-young, Jung Jin-woo and Yu Hyun-mok. The film was based on ideas of Kim Ki-young's wife, Kim Yu-bong, and Kim directed the last third.

== Synopsis ==
The film is a melodrama about a man who falls in love with a woman while traveling to Seoraksan. The man becomes infatuated with the woman's hair. The woman, who has a terminal illness, promises to leave her hair to the man after she has died. Later the man finds that the woman has died, and her hair has been sold to someone else. He then has a romantic relationship with another woman who turns out to be his mother.

== Cast ==
- Shin Seong-il
- Moon Hee
- Kim Ji-mee
- Choi Eun-hee

== Bibliography ==
- Lee, Kyung-eun. "Woman". asianfilms.org. Archived from the original on 2004-09-08.
