= The Evil Stairs =

- Poster to The Evil Stairs (1964)
- Hangul: 마의 계단
- Hanja: 魔의 階段
- RR: Maui gyedan
- MR: Maŭi kyedan
- Directed by: Lee Man-hee
- Written by: Lee Jong-taek
- Produced by: U Gi-dong
- Starring: Kim Jin-kyu; Moon Jung-suk
- Cinematography: Seo Jeong-min
- Edited by: Kim Hee-su
- Music by: Han Sang-gi
- Distributed by: Seki Trading Co.
- Release date: July 10, 1964
- Running time: 108 minutes
- Country: South Korea
- Language: Korean

The Evil Stairs (Korean: 마의 계단; also known as The Devil's Stairway) is a 1964 South Korean mystery film directed by Lee Man-hee.

== Synopsis ==
A chief surgeon kills the nurse with whom he is having an affair after he becomes engaged to be married to the hospital director's daughter. After disposing of the nurse's body in a lake, he becomes tormented by her spirit, and in a confused mental state, kills his fiancée.

== Cast ==
- Kim Jin-kyu as Hyeon Gwang-ho
- Moon Jung-suk as Nam Jin-suk
- Bang Seong-ja as O Jeong-ja
- Jeong Ae-ran
- Choi Nam-Hyun
- Yu Gye-seon
- Jo Hang
- Kim Ung
- Jeong Cheol
- Ji Bang-yeol

== Bibliography ==
- "The Devil's Stairway (1964)". KMDb Korean Movie Database.
- Paquet, Darcy. "The Evil Stairs (1964)". www.koreanfilm.org.
- Maeui gyedan (1964) at IMDb
- "마의 계단 The Evil Stairs, 1964" (in Korean). Cine21.
