= Patriotic Martyr An Jung-gun =

- Theatrical poster for Patriotic Martyr An Jung-gun (1972)
- Hangul: 의사 안중근
- Hanja: 義士 安重根
- RR: Uisa An Junggeun
- MR: Ŭisa An Chunggŭn
- Directed by: Joo Dong-jin
- Written by: Choi Keum-dong; Lee Jeong-seon
- Produced by: Joo Dong-jin
- Starring: Kim Jin-kyu; Park Nou-sik; Moon Jung-suk; Han Mun-jeong
- Cinematography: Chun Jo-myuong
- Edited by: Kim Chang-sun
- Music by: Kim Hee-jo
- Distributed by: Yeonbang Movies
- Release date: February 16, 1972
- Running time: 126 minutes
- Country: South Korea
- Language: Korean

Patriotic Martyr An Jung-gun (Korean: 의사 안중근) is a 1972 South Korean film directed by Joo Dong-jin. It was chosen as Best Film at the Grand Bell Awards.

== Plot ==
A film biography of An Jung-geun, a Korean independence activist who assassinated Itō Hirobumi, the first Prime Minister of Japan.

== Cast ==
- Kim Jin-kyu
- Park No-sik
- Moon Jung-suk
- Han Mun-jeong
- Choi Nam-Hyun
- Choi Bool-am
- Lee Dae-yub
- Hah Myung-joong
- Choe Seong-ho
- Park Am

== Bibliography ==
- "Uisa Ahn Jung-geun". The Complete Index to World Film. Archived from the original on 2012-03-25.
- 의사 안중근. Cine21 (in Korean).

Preceded by Prince Daewon	Grand Bell Awards for Best Film; 1972	Succeeded by The General in Red Robes
