= Assassin (1969 film) =

1969 South Korean thriller film

- Poster for Assassin (1969)
- Hangul: 암살자
- Hanja: 暗殺者
- RR: Amsalja
- MR: Amsalcha
- Directed by: Lee Man-hee
- Written by: Lee Eun-seong
- Produced by: Kim Tai-soo
- Starring: Jang Dong-he; Namkoong Won; Park Am
- Cinematography: Lee Suck-ki
- Edited by: Yu Jae-won
- Music by: Jeon Jong-kun
- Production company: Tae Chang Enterprises
- Release date: January 16, 1969
- Running time: 73 minutes
- Country: South Korea
- Language: Korean

Assassin (Korean: 암살자) is a 1969 South Korean thriller film directed by Lee Man-hee.

== Plot ==
After the liberation of Korea in 1945, the communists decide to kill one of their members, a general, who has decided to change sides. They hire a very skilled assassin (Jang Dong-he) who lives with a young daughter. The assassin meets one of the communists (Namkoong Won), who leads him all night long to the general's home, near a lake. During that time, another killer waits at the assassin's home, playing with the young girl. The assassin eventually manages to get to the general and assassinates him, but he is murdered afterwards by the communist, who is himself killed by his comrades.

== Cast ==
- Jang Dong-he
- Namkoong Won
- Park Am
- Kim Hea-kyung
- Oh Ji-myung
- Jeon Young-sun
- Choe Bong
- Lee Hae-ryong
- Park Ki-teak
- Kim Ki-bum
