= Kim Jin-kyu (actor) =

South Korean actor, film director and producer

- Kim in 1962
- Born: 16 April 1922; Seocheon, Chūseinan-dō, Korea, Empire of Japan
- Died: 18 June 1998 (aged 76); Seoul, South Korea
- Occupations: Actor; film director; producer
- Years active: 1949–1987
- Spouse: Kim Boae (m. 1962; sep. 1975)
- Children: Kim Jin-ah, Kim Jin-geun

Korean name
- Hangul: 김진규
- Hanja: 金振奎
- RR: Gim Jingyu
- MR: Kim Chin'gyu

Kim Jin-kyu (Korean: 김진규; 16 April 1922 – 18 June 1998) was a South Korean actor, film director and producer.

== Personal life ==
He had four children with actress Kim Boae, two of them, Kim Jin-ah and Kim Jin-geun both became actors. The couple separated after 13 years of marriage, in 1975.

== Filmography ==
*Note; the whole list is referenced.

Year	English title	Korean title	Romanization	Role	Director
	Raccoon Dog				
	Maid's Room		Hahyeo-ui bang		
	Street of Desire		Yogmang-ui geoli		
	Wedding Night Misunderstanding		Cho-ya-e taneun gang		
	I Want To Go		Gagopa		
	Ambition and Challenge		Yamanggwa dojeon		
	Love That Left Autumn Behind		Ga-eul-eul namgigo gan salang		
	The Miss and the Cadet		Agassi-wa sagwan		
	My Love 3		Salanghaneun salam-a 3		
	Like A Flower Petal or a Leaf		Kkoch-ip-i-eo-ra nakyeob-i-eo-ra		
	My Pounding Heart		Simjang-i ttwine		
	My Love (Sequel)		Saranghaneun saram-a (sok)		
	Can't Forget the First Love		Cheos-sarangeun mos-ij-eo		
	The Heart is a Lonely Hunter		Maeumeun oerowun sanyangkkun		
1982	Madame Aema		Aemabu-in		
	Chun-hi		Chunhui		
	Iron Men		Cheolindeul		
	The Carriage Running into the Winter		Gyeo-ullo ganeun macha		
	Not for Tonight		Oneulbam-eun cham-euse-yo		
	Forgive Me Once Again Despite Hatred '80		Mi-wodo dasihanbeon '80		
	Goodbye Daddy '81		Appa-annyeong '81		
	The One I Love		Salanghaneun salam-a		
	Whale Island Escapade		Golaeseom sodong		
	Geniuses With the Grade F		Epeu hagjeom-ui cheonjaedeul		
	The Woman on the Ferris Wheel		Mogma-wi-ui yeoja		
	The Tripitaka Koreana		Hogug Palmandaejanggyeong		
	The Panmunjom Poplar Operation		Panmunjeom milyunamu jagjeon		
1978	Diary of Korean-Japanese War		Nanjung-ilgi		
	The First Snow		Cheosnun-i naelil ttae		
	A Yeong Man aware of Kwang Hwa Moon Well		Gwanghwamuntong a-i		
	Hot Wind in Arabia		Alabi-a yeolpung		
	Mother and Son		Eomeoni-wa adeul		
	Blue Classroom		Puleun gyosil		
	Similar Toes		Balgalag-i dalm-assda		
	Windmill of My Mind		Naema-eum-ui pungcha		
	Murder With Ax in Pan Moon Jeom		Panmunjeom dokkisal-in		
1975	Flame		Bulkkoch		
1975	The Road to Sampo		Sampoganeun gil		
	The Tae-Baeks		Taebaegsanmaeg		
	The Last Embrace		Majimag po-ong		
	A Story of Crazy Painter : Gwanghwasa		Gwanghwasa		
	Reminiscences		Hoesang		
	I Won't Cry		Ulji anh-euli		
	A Little Bird		Jag-eun sae		
	Yoo Kwan-Sun		Yu Gwansun		
	In a Lonely Mountain Villa		Oelo-un sanjang-eseo		
	With My Daddy and I		Appahago nahago		
	Your Cold Hands		Geudae-ui chanson		
	Where There Is Love		Salang-i issneun gos-e		
	Luck		Haeng-un		
	Unforgettable Mother Love		Ijji moshal mojeong		
	Testimony		Jeung-eon		
	Julia and Tokukawa Ieyasu		Jyuli-a-wa Dokkuga-wa Ieyaseu		
	Love with My Whole Body		Momjeonchelo salang-eul		
	Heroes of Anke		Angke-ui yeong-ungdeul		
	The Military Academy		Yuggunsagwanhaggyo		
	Suspended Sentence		Jibhaeng-yu-ye		
	Deep Relations		Gip-eun sa-i		
	Leave at Sunset		Seog-yang-e tteonala		
	Daddy's Name Is...		Appa-ui ileum-eun		
	To Judge One's Beloved Son		Salanghaneun adeul-ui simpan		
	My Home Where I Can Never Go Back		Dol-agal su eobsneun gohyang		
	Great Monk Seo-San		Seosandaesa		
1972	Patriotic Martyr An Jung-gun		Uisa An Junggeun		
	Kneel Down and Pray		Muleupkkulhgo billyeonda		
	Resistance		Hyangjeon		
	Rainbow Over the Island		Nagdo-ui mujigae		
	Lee Sun-Sin, the Great General		Seong-ung I Sunsin		
	Tomorrow's Scenery of Korea (episode 3)		Nae-il-ui paldogangsan		
	When We Meet Again		Mannabwado jigeum-eun		
	The Alimony		Wijalyo		
	Madame Impetuous		Geugseongbu-in		
	Great King Sejo		Sejodae-wang		
	When We Have Hatred		Dangsin-i mi-wojilttae		
	The Evening Bell		Manjong		
	Two Husbands		Du yeobo		
	Chaser		Mihaengja		
	Madam Freedom		Jayu Buin		
	Jealousy and Murder		Charari Nam-iramyeon		
	Mrs. Wonnim		Wonnimdaeg		
	Flower Sandals		Kkot Beoseon		
	Leave Your Heart		Ddeonado Maeummaneun		
	Cruel Revenge		Pido Nunmuldo Eopda		
	Husband		Nampyeon		
	Friend's Husband		Hanbeon Jun Maeuminde		
	If We Didn't Meet		Mannaji Anatdamyeon		
	The Second Wife		Huchwidaeg		
	Hwang Jin-Yi's First Love		Hwang Jini-ui Cheot-sarang		
	A Plateau		Gowon		
	I Want to Be Human		Nado Ingani Doeryeonda		
	Chunwon Lee Gwang-Su		Chunwon Lee Gwangsu		
	Youth		Cheongchun		
	Destiny of My Load		Jeonha Eodiro Gasinaikka		
	Love and Song		I Gangsan Naghwa Yusu		
	Your Name Is Women		Neo-ui Ireum-eun Yeoja		
	Snowy Night		Nun Narineun Bam		
	A Letter from an Unknown Woman		Moreuneun Yeoin-ui Pyeonji		
	Love and Hate		Sarang-i Miweo Jilddae		
	Until That Day		Neujeodo Geunalkkaji		
1969	Elegy of Ren		Len-ui Aega		
	The Geisha of Korea		Paldo Gisaeng		
	Blues of the Twilight		Hwanghon-ui Bureuseu		
	A Victim		Pihaeja		
	Death Can't Fall Us Apart		Jugeodo Monijeo		
	Three-Thousand Miles of Legend		Jeonseol-ddara Samcheon-ri		
	Goodbye Dad		Abba An-nyeong		
	The Land of Korea		Paldo-gangsan		
	The Arms and the Body		Mugiwa Yukche		
	Sunset		Nakjo		
	Women's Quarter		Gyubang		
	Feeling of Love		Aesim		
	Madam Hwasan		Hwasandaek		
	I Will Give You Everything		Mongttang Deurilkkayo		
	Stars in My Heart		Byeora Nae Gaseume		
1968	Descendants of Cain		Cain-ui Huye		
	Cloisonne Ring		Chilbo Banji		
	Unfulfilled Love		Motdahan Sarang		
	Daughter		Ttal		
	Noble Lady		Gwibuin		
	Popular Songs in the Past 50 Years		Gayobansegi		
	The Mother's Diary		Eomma-ui Ilgi		
	Horrible 18 Days		Gongpo-ui Sipparil		
	The Freezing Point		Bingjeom		
	Madame Jet		Jeteu Buin		
	Soil		Heuk		
	Others		Taindeul		
	The Japanese Emperor And the Martyr		Ilboncheonhwanggwa Poktanuisa		
	Confession of an Actress		Eoneu Yeobaeu-ui Gobaek		
	Destiny		Sungmyeong		
	An Angry Calf		Seongnan Songaji		
	A Brother and Sister		Nammae		
	Six Daughters		The Land of Korea / Paldogangsan		
	Original Sin		Wonjoe		
	Three Swordsmen of Iljimae		Iljimae Samgeomgaeg		
	Joy		Hwanhui		
	Regret		Huhoe		
	An Attachment in Hawaii		Hawaiui Yeonjeong		
	Four Sisters		Nejamae		
1967	Phantom Queen		Dajeongbulsim		
	Her White Mourning Dress		Sobok		
1967	Coming Back		Gwiro		
	Waves		Pado		
	Tyrant		Daepokgun		
	The Sword of Iljimae		Iljimae Pilsaui Geom		
	The Sun Rises Again		Taeyangeun Dasi Tteunda		
	Court Ladies		Sang-gung Nain		
	Enchantress Bae Jeong-ja		Yohwa Bae Jeong-ja		
	Thousand Miles between the South and the North		Nambukcheonri		
	Stronger Than Love		Sarangboda Ganghan Geot		
	Nostalgia		Manghyang		
	Clouds, Let Me Ask You Something		Tteungureuma Malmureo Boja		
	War and a Female Teacher		Jeonjaenggwa Yeogyosa		
	Father and Mrs. Pyeongyang		Appawa Pyeongyangdaek		
	Black Thief		Heukdojeok		
	How's Your Wife?		Daegui Buineun Eoddeosimnigga		
	Affection		Yujeong		
	Nilliri		Nilliri		
	International Gold Robbery		Gukje Geumgoe sageon		
	Ballad for a Mill		Banga Taryeong		
	Hwangpo Mast		Hwangpodochdae		
	The Way of the Woman		Yeoja-ui Gil		
	Madam Wing		Nalgae Bu-in		
	The Idiot		Babo		
	Life Like a Flame		Saengmyeong-eun Bulkkot-cheoreom		
	Behold this Woman		I yeojareul Bora		
	The Scarlet Skirt		Juhong Skeoteu		
	The Married Woman		Yubunyeo		
	The Lady of Honor		Jeonggyeong Bu-in		
	The Martyrs		Sungyoja		
	Look Up the Sky and Look Down the Earth		Haneulbogo Ttang-eul Bogo		
	The Legal Wife		Keundaek		
	Chupung Mountain Pass		Chupungnyeong		
	The Sino-Japanese War and Queen Min the Heroine		Cheong-iljeonjaenggwa yeogeol Minbi		
	The Nobleman at Jeong-dong		Jeongdongdaegam		
	Only a Woman Should Cry?		Yeojamani Uleoya Hana		
	The Sunflower Blooming at Night		Bam-e pin Haebaragi		
	The Elegy		Manga		
	The Two Fathers		Du Appa		
	The Woman with a Past		Gwageoreul gajin yeoja		
	The Cradlesong in Tears		Nunmur-ui Jajangga		
1964	Deaf Sam-yong		Beongeori Samryongi		
	Prince Suyang and Mt. Baekdu		Suyanggwa Baekdusan		
	Princess Snow White		Baekseolgongju		
	Let's Meet on Thursday		Mogyoire Mannapsida		
	The Woman of Myeongdong		Myeongdong-ajumma		
	The Korean Instrument with 12 strings		Ga-yageum		
	My Darling Has Passed Away, but His Song Still Remains		Nim-eun Gasigo Noraeman Nameo		
	My Mind Is Like a Lake		Naemaeum-eun Hosu		
	The Skirt Rock		Chima Bawi		
	The Couple Struggle		Bubu jeonjaeng		
	The Gentleman of Jin-gogae		Jin-gogae Sinsa		
	I Sacrifice Myself Silently		Maleopssi Bachiryeonda		
	The Teacher with Ten Daughters		Sipjamae Seonsaeng		
1964	Asphalt		Asphalt		
	The Intimidator		Hyeopbakja		
1964	Extra Human Being		Ing-yeo Ingan		
	The Chaste Woman Arang		Arang-ui Jeongjo		
	The Smile in Grief		Seulpeun Miso		
	Her Majesty Yeonghwa		Yeonghwa Mama		
1964	The Devil's Stairway				
	The Body Confession		Yukche-ui Gobak		
	A Winter Vagabond		Gyeo-ul Nageune		
	Sinmungo		Sinmungo		
	Get on the Express Train		Geupaeng-yeolchareul Tara		
	The Eight Swordsmen		Palgeomgaek		
	Cheondong		Cheondong		
	Han Seok-bong				
	Dreams of Youth will be Splendid		Pureun Kkumeun Binnari		
	Angry Cosmos		Seongnan Coseumoseu		
	The Stepmother		Sae-eomma		
	Samyeongdang		Samyeongdang		
	The Couple Testimony		Bubu Joyak		
	The Masked Prince		Bongmyeondaegun		
	Tokyo Elegy		Donggyeong Biga		
1963	Goryeojang		Goryeojang		
	Call Me Mother Someday		Eonjenga Eomeonira Bulleoda-o		
	A Returning Ship		Gwigukseon		
	Aeran		Aeran		
	Even Dandelions Bloom in Spring		Mindeullekkotdobom-imyeon Pinda		
	The Long Nakdong River		Nakdonggang Chilbaengri		
	Where is the Land to Live on		Saraya Hal Ttang-eun Eodinya		
	My Wife is Best		Nae Anaega Choegoya		
	King's Secret Agent		Mapaewa Geom		
	Impossible Love		Geonneoji Motaneun Gang		
	The Macaw Couple		Ingkko Bubu		
	Bye Dad		Appa-annyeong		
	I Will Never Let Her Go Again		Dasineun Nochi Aneuryeonda		
	My Life Is Mine		Gibune Sanda		
	Cheongwannyeo		Cheongwannyeo		
	China Town		Chaina Taun		
	Love for 300 Years		Aejeongsambaengnyeon		
	Yeodo		Yeodo		
	My Wife's Secret		Anae-ui-bimil		
	Prince Hodong		Wangja Hodong		
	What Happens in an Alley		Golmogan Punggyeong		
	Where Love and Death Meet		Sarang-gwa Jugeum-ui Haehyeob		
	Qin Shu Huangdi and the Great Wall of China		Jinsihwangje-wa Mallijangseong		
	Between the Sky and the Earth		Haneulgwa Ttangsa-i-e		
	A Sad Cry		Bulleodo Daedab-eomneun Ireumi-yeo		
	How I Love You		Yeojeongmalli		
	Tyrant Yeonsan		Pokgun Yeonsan		
	Yang Kuei-Fei, a Destructive Beauty		Cheonha-ilsaek Yang Gwibi		
	Leaving the Fatherland		Dugo-on Sanha		
	Until I Die		Sarainneun Geunalkkaji		
	A Happy Day of Jinsa Maeng		Maengjinsadaek Gyeongsa		
	The Way to Seoul		Seoullo Ganeun Gil		
	Times of Love and Hatred		Sarang-gwa Mi-um-ui Sewol		
	The Best Bride and a Plain Young Man		Teukdeungsinbu-wa Samdeung Sillang		
	Undercover Agent Park Munsu		Amhaeng-eosa Park Munsu		
	As Time Passes, Love and Sorrow Will...		Sarangdo Seulpeumdo Sewori Gamyeon		
	Black Hood		Heukdu-geon		
	Honeymoon Train		Hapjugi-ui Sinhon Yeolcha		
	Walking in Tears		Nunmul-eorin Baljaguk		
1961	The Sea Knows		Hyeonhaetaneun Algo Itda		
1961	The Houseguest and My Mother		Sarangbang Sonnimgwa Eomeoni		
	Gate to the Forbidden		Geumdan-ui mun		
	When Love Knocks		Sarang-i Muneul Dudeurilttae		
	Emile		Emille Jong		
	Where There Was a Castle		Hwangseong Yet Teo		
	Lady Jang		Janghuibin		
	Farewell at Busan		Ibyeol-ui Busan Jeonggeojang		
	Don't Worry, Mother!		Eomeonim Ansimhasoseo		
	Confession at Midnight		Simya-ui Gobaek		
	Under the Sky of Seoul		Seoul-ui Jibungmit		
	My Father Was on a Death Row		Sahyeongsu-ui Ttal		
	River Runs Only in Night		Bameman Heureuneun Gang		
	A Star		Byeol		
	A Miser		Gudusoe		
	A Song of Passion		Gyeokjeongga		
	A Torrent		Gyeokryu		
	My Sister is a Hussy		Eonni-neun Malgwallyang-i		
	Ruined		Pamyeol		
1961	Aimless Bullet		Obaltan		
1961	Prince Yeonsan		Yeonsan-gun		
	Seong Chun-hyang		Seong Chun-hyang		
	Kaleidoscope		Jumadeung		
	A Sad Saturday		Aesu-e jeoj-eun to-yo-il		
	A Forbidden Love		Saranghaeseon andoel sarang-eul		
	Late-night Blues		Sim-ya-ui buleuseu		
	Before Sunset		Haetteol-eojigi jeon-e		
	History of Love		Sarang-ui yeogsa		
	A Love Front		Yeon-aejeonseon		
	A Pearl Tower		Jinjutab		
	A Revival		Jaesaeng		
	Your Voice		Geudae mogsori		
	Soil		Heulg		
	The Moral of Youth		Cheongchun-ui yunli		
	Blood is Alive		Pineun sal-a-issda		
	A Murder Without Passion		Jeong-yeol-eobsneun sal-in		
	A Youth Garden		Cheongchunhwa-won		
	The Returned Man		Dol-a-on sana-i		
1960	The Housemaid		Hanyeo		
	A Drifting Story		Pyoludo		
	A Tragedy on Earth		Jisang-ui bigeug		
	A Young Look		Jeolm-eun pyojeong		
1960	To the Last Day		I saengmyeong dahadorok		
	Have I Come to Cry?		Ullyeogo naega wassdeonga		
	A Romantic Papa		Lomaenseuppappa		
	Mr. Park		Parkseobang		
	Always Thinking of You		Jana Kkaena		
	Dongsimcho		Dongsimcho		
	Independence Association and young Lee Seung-Man		Dongniphyeophoewa Cheongnyeon Lee Seung-man		
	Madam Butterfly		Nabibuin		
	Delivery of Youths		Cheongchunbaedal		
	An Inn		Yeoinsuk		
	A Long Affection		Yujeongcheolli		
	A Youth Theater		Cheongchungeukjang		
	Streets of the Sun		Taeyangui Geori		
	No More Tragedies		Bigeugeun Eopda		
	A Grief		Aesang		
	Oh! My Hometown		O Nae Gohyang		
	A Sunny Place in the Twilight		Hwanghone Gitdeun Yangji		
	Because I Love You		Salanghaneun kkadalg-e		
	I Am Alone		Na honjaman-i		
	The Money		Don		
	The Love of Shadow		Geurimja sarang		
	Returned Lover		Geudaeneun dol-a-wassgeonman		
	An Exotic Garden		Igugjeong-won		
	Love		Sarang		
	The Postwar Generation		Jeonhupa		
	Ok-Dan-Chun		Ok dan-chun		
	The Virgin Star		Cheonyeobyeol		
	A Cross in Gunfire		Pohwasog-ui sibjaga		
1955	Piagol		Piagol		

== Director ==
Year	English title	Korean title	Romanization	Role	Director
	Seed Money		Jongjadon		

=== Light ===
Year	English title	Korean title	Romanization	Role	Director
	Returned Left-handed Man		Doraon Oensonjabi		

== Awards ==
- 1964, the 2nd Blue Dragon Film Awards : Best Actor and Best Favorite Actor for The Extra Mortals
- 1965, the 1st Baeksang Arts Awards : Best Film Actor (벙어리 삼룡)
- 1966, the 4th Blue Dragon Film Awards : Best Favorite Actor
- 1966, the 5th Grand Bell Awards : Best Actor for The Sun Rises Again (Taeyangeun Dasi Tteunda)
- 1967, the 3rd Baeksang Arts Awards : Best Film Actor
- 1975, the 14th Grand Bell Awards : Best Supporting Actor for A Road to Sampo (Sampoganeun gil)
- 1975, the 11th Baeksang Arts Awards : Best Film Actor for A story of crazy painter (Gwanghwasa)
- 1977, the 16th Grand Bell Awards : Best Actor for A War Diary (Nanjung ilgi)
- 1986, the 25th Grand Bell Awards : 86 Yeonghwainsang

== See also ==
- Cinema of Korea
