= Kim U-jin =

Korean playwright

- Born: Kim U-jin; September 19, 1897; Jangseong-gun, Kingdom of Joseon
- Died: August 4, 1926 (aged 28); Korea Strait
- Education: Waseda University
- Occupations: Playwright; poet

Kim U-jin (Korean: 김우진; 19 September 1897 – 4 August 1926) was a Korean playwright, poet, essayist, and dramatist. He was the first professional literary critic in the history of Korean literature. Among his works, Kim wrote five plays during his brief career, one of them being Wild Pig (1926). Along with Wild Pig (1926), Kim is well known for his poem, Theory of Life and Death (1926).

== Life and career ==
Kim was born to a big landowner in the Jeolla Province of what was then known as the Kingdom of Joseon. He went to Tokyo in order to pursue a career in drama while majoring in English literature at Waseda University. Kim was married and had a wife and children in his hometown.

In Japan, Kim met and fell in love with a soprano named Yun Sim-deok (윤심덕), with whom he had an affair.

Kim and Yun Sim-deok committed suicide together in 1926, jumping off a passenger ship en route from Shimonoseki to Busan. The news of the two lovers’ suicide caused a sensation in Korea.

Kim's literary achievements were not revealed until the late 1970s and published in 1983. Attention came to his extensive knowledge of Western literature and remarkable insight into Western philosophy.

== Legacy ==
A film have been made about Kim and Yun Sim-deok's story. Released in 1991, Death Song was directed by Kim Ho-sun and starred Chang Mi-hee. The film won numerous awards in South Korea, including Best Film at the 1991 Blue Dragon Film Awards and the 1991 Chunsa Film Art Awards. A mini-television series was also made in 2018 titled The Hymn of Death. A book titled In Praise of Death written by Han So-jin is based on the story.
