= Film censorship in South Korea =

At various points in South Korea's history, the social influence of film prompted the government to place strict regulations setting out guidelines that films must follow in order to be viewed by the public. There are two major periods where film censorship strongly impacted the growth of the film industry in South Korea: the period of colonial Korea under Japanese rule (Japanese occupation) and the period of military dictatorship in the mid-twentieth century, when the film industry was heavily surveilled. During these two periods, filmmakers were barred from freely expressing their creativity, thoughts, and ideas, some believe these restrictions led to the decline of the film industry in South Korea.

== Film censorship in Colonial Korea under Japanese rule ==
Film was introduced to Korea during the Chosun dynasty (1897–1910), and it quickly became a predominant form of media. The beginning of the Japanese occupation in 1910 saw the commencement of censorship laws categorically meant to protect the image of the Japanese empire. Also, films that dissuaded war-related objectives or praised America were forbidden. Laws introduced in this period included the Motion Picture Censorship Regulation and the Chosun Motion Picture Law.

The Motion Picture Censorship Regulation includes:

1. All foreign and domestic films need consent before being televised
2. Japanese police must be present for screenings

The Chosun Motion Picture Law includes:

1. Precondition to obtain license in the film industry
2. Preliminary restraint of films
3. Punishment for non-observance of the law

The major impetus for establishing such laws was to strengthen control of the public since such media were excellent vehicles to influence its viewers. They required filmmakers not to tarnish the image of the Japanese Empire nor praise their enemy, in order to prevent any form of doubt on the Japanese paramountcy. They closed down several Korean film production companies and banned some films that were unfavorable to the Japanese Empire.

Major films influenced by censorship:

- Bloody Horse (1928) directed by Hong Kae-myung
- Imjaeobtneun naleutbae (The Ownerless Ferry Boat) (1932) directed by Lee Kyu-hwan

== Film censorship under the new military regime ==
Film censorship had a severe impact on the South Korean film industry during the depression period between 1973 and 1992. During this period, film censorship was strongly enforced under the military regime by Park Chung Hee and Chun Doo Hwan. Prior to 1987, the government enacted the First Motion Picture Law to take control of the film industry. This law did not allow the industry to freely produce a movie if the contents did not meet their criteria. President Park Chung Hee established the Motion Picture Promotion Corporation (MPPC) to support the film industry. However, Park's main purpose was to prevent any antigovernmental sentiment from being featured in movies.

Elements of MPPC:

1. License system
2. Import quotas to set a limitation on the number of films to be produced
3. Strong censorship

The filmmakers could only depict the positive side of Korean society. Thus, the resulting films were not always able to be genuine expressions of the filmmakers' true visions, which precipitated a quality decline. The filmmakers continuously pushed the government to amend their censorship laws in order to promote freedom of expression, but the attempts were futile due to unyielding political influence. This is considered the main contributor to the decline of South Korea's film industry.

== Past ==
Government censorship has a history with Korean cinema. In 1907, the inspector general created the security law, which stated that anything that is performed in public can be regulated and controlled by the government. When Korea was under Japanese rule, censorship was more strongly regulated. The Governor-General of Korea made an activity regulation committee in 1920 and performance regulation rules in 1922. Many movies were censored during this period of time. Across the Tumen River was allowed to be released after the deletion of some scenes and changing the movie's name to To Find Love. Ben-Hur had been issued because the silent-firm narrator encouraged national consciousness.

In 1960, after the April Revolution, the national movie ethic committee was founded. It was the very first public organization that evaluated movies without government watch. As a result, Aimless Bullet and A Coachman, two films about national consciousness, could be played in the theater. After the 5.16 military takeover, a military government emerged and amended the constitution. The amendment stated that for public morals and social ethics, the government can censor movies or entertainment. After the amendment, Aimless Bullet was pulled from theaters because the state interpreted one line in the movie, "Let's go," to mean "Let's go to the north." During that period, the anti-communism law allowed for the Central Intelligence Agency to arrest people, which was cited in the arrest of Man-hee Lee, the director of Seven Women Prisoners. They stated that he described the North Korean Army as good and cool. They released him under the condition that he make a film that exposed anti-communist ideals, which is why he made Soldier Without Service Number. They arrested him again because he cast an attractive man to be in the North Korean army. During this period of time, all the movies that were made had to pass two different government censorship checks, one before and one after filming. More than 80% of movies had to be revised prior to filming. For example, in Fool’s March, many parts of the script had to be deleted before the film was even made, resulting in the deletion of half an hour of the film.

After South Korea opened the Olympics in 1988, it became viable to import the movies about communism and the censorship policies for eroticism were reduced, but not many things did not change. In September 1996, 10 minutes of the movie Crash directed by David Cronenberg were deleted, which led to great shame at the Busan International Film Festival. One month later, The Constitutional Court ruled that the censorship was unconstitutional. Following that rule, the movie laws had to be changed, and the Korea Media Rating Board was founded. They also made an additional rating level over R rating reserved for movies that cannot be shown in regular movie theaters and can only be shown in designated unrated theaters, which do not exist in Korea. This means that filmmakers have to delete certain scenes in order for their films to receive an R rating. Even though the Korea Movie Rating Board does not have the power to regulate the scenes in the movies, they can imply that the moviemakers need to censor the movies in order for the film to be shown.

== Present ==
In recent years, sexual scenes have been a major issue that sets filmmakers against the Media Rating Board. Pubic hair and male or female genitalia are prohibited on the screen, unless they are digitally blurred. In rare cases, extreme violence, obscene language, or certain portrayals of drug use may become an issue. South Korea has 5 different levels of rating systems: G, PG-12, PG-15, R-18 and Restricted Rate. These are ruled by the Presidential Decree. The first movie that was rated as restricted was Yellow Hair. The fact that it received the restricted rate made people watch this movie more than usual. It was rejected in early 1999 before being rated an 18+ rate on its second application, after a sex scene between two women and one man was partially cut and digitally altered. The movie Lies sued the Movie Rating Board for a restricted rating to the Constitutional Court, and it ruled that the reservation rate was unconstitutional. They changed from the reservation rate to Restricted Rate. It was not different from the reservation rate, because the Board made restricted rate movie theaters afterwards; they all went bankrupt or shut down. The movies that received an R-rating lost their place to be shown. The movie I Saw the Devil (2010) could be shown at the theater only after the deletion of one and half minutes.

The 2014 film The Interview was banned in South Korea because it depicts criticizing and killing the North Korean leader Kim Jong-un. Although it was available in black markets, in 2015, a North Korean defector sent unlicensed copies of the film via a helium balloon into the DMZ.

Lee Jang-ho stated that most of his films had been exhibited following rounds of blue pencil censoring, although he attempted not to be aware of censorship even before and throughout filming.
