= Hong Nan-pa =

Korean musician (1897–1941)

- Hangul: 홍영후
- Hanja: 洪永厚
- RR: Hong Yeonghu
- MR: Hong Yŏnghu

Professional name
- Hangul: 홍난파
- Hanja: 洪蘭坡
- RR: Hong Nanpa
- MR: Hong Nanp'a

Hong Nan-pa (April 10, 1898 – August 30, 1941) was a Korean composer, violinist, conductor, music critic and educator. He is best known as the composer of "Bongseonhwa" (봉선화, literally "garden balsam") written in 1919. It is generally considered as the first true Korean original song composed in Western style. It was widely sung during the period. Hong also contributed to developing Korean culture during the period with his diverse cultural activities.

== Biography ==
Hong Nan-pa was born at Hwalcho Village of Namyang Township in present Hwangseong County, Gyeonggi. He was the second son to his father, Hong Sun (홍순) of the native Namyang Hong clan and his mother from Jeonju Yi clan of Jeolla. He had one brother and two sisters. Nan-pa was his ho, or art name, but his given name was Yeong-hu. His family moved to Seoul when he was still a young child. As he lived near the Ewha Haktang (이화학당) located in the neighborhood of Jeong-dong, he attended Jeongdong Methodist Church and got access to hymn, a Western music.

He learned basic Confucian studies at a local seodang (a kind of elementary school) and entered a middle school in 1910 which was affiliated with the Hwangseong Young Men's Christian Association (황성기독교청년회, Korean YMCA). Since then, he had a violin and received music lessons. At the age of fifteen, Hong was admitted to the Western music department of Korean Court Music Study Institute (조선정악전습소 Joseon Jeongak Jeonseupso) that was the only music school in Korea at that time. He studied vocal music and violin from Kim In-sik (김인식). After the graduation, he was hired as an assistant teacher at the school.

In 1918, he went to Japan to enter Tokyo Music School in Ueno but returned to Korea to participate in the March First Movement as temporarily absent from the school. One year after the movement, he went back to Japan. However, Hong was rejected to continue his study at the school because of his involvement in the independent movement, so that he came back to Korea in despair. During his stay in Japan, he published the first Korean music magazine titled "Samgwang" (삼광, literally "Three Light"). After his return, he worked as a news reporter for Maeil Sinbunsa, and even attended Severance Medical School which became later the medical department of Yonsei University.

In April 1920, Hong included the score of Aesu (애수, literally "sorrow"), a violin piece on the end pages of his short novel "Cheonyeohon" (lit. "a maiden's soul). He asked Kim Hyeong-jun for lyrics for the tune, which became "Bongseonhwa" (봉선화). In 1922, Hong made efforts to promote music while he participated in Yeongakhoe (연악회, Music Research Society) established by Gyeongsang Akuhoe (경상악우회, Gyeongsang Music Friend Society)'s lead. In 1925, he had the first solo violin recital as a Korean and published Eumakgye (음악계, Music World), the first music magazine published in Korea. In 1926, as Hong entered Kunitachi College of Music as a transfer student, he was accepted to play first violin at the New Symphony Orchestra (新交響樂團, now the NHK Symphony Orchestra). After graduation in 1929, he returned to Korea and published the first volume of Collection of 100 Korean Children's Songs (조선동요 100곡집) through Yeongakhoe. Hong also published Eumakmanpil (음악만필/音樂漫筆, Music Essays) in Changjo in 1938.

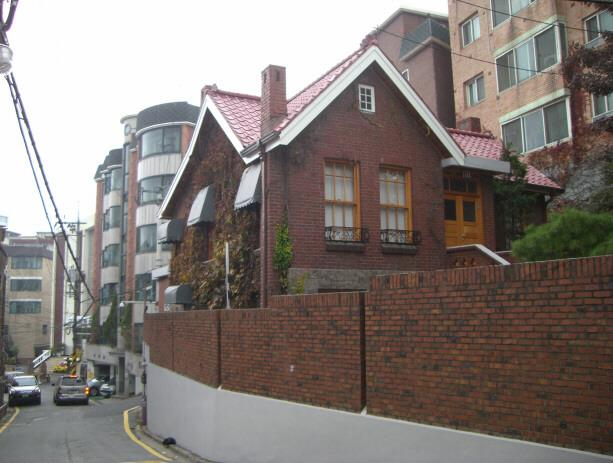
The former residence of Hong Nan-pa in the Sajik-dong neighborhood of Seoul

The Sorrow of Korea (애수의 조선, Aesuui Joseon)
Composed in 1921 and recorded in 1931 by Hong Nan-pa

== Popular culture ==
Hong Nan-pa was portrayed by Lee Ji-hoon in the 2018 SBS TV series The Hymn of Death.

== See also ==
- Ahn Eak-tai
- Korean music
- List of South Korean musicians
- List of North Korean musicians
