= Henequen (film) =

- Theatrical poster for Henequen (1996)
- Directed by: Kim Ho-sun
- Written by: Im Yu-sun; Kim Ho-sun
- Produced by: Kwak Jeong-hwan; Roh Jin-seup
- Starring: Chang Mi-hee
- Cinematography: Lee Seong-chun
- Edited by: Hyeon Dong-jun
- Music by: Michael Staudacher; Kim Jeong-hui
- Distributed by: Hap Dong Films Co., Ltd.
- Release date: December 13, 1996
- Running time: 148 minutes
- Country: South Korea
- Languages: Korean; Spanish

Henequen (Korean: 애니깽; RR: Aenikkaeng) is a 1996 South Korean film directed by Kim Ho-sun. It was awarded Best Film at the Grand Bell Awards ceremony.

== Plot ==
This historical drama, set in 1905, depicts the difficult plight of Korean henequen field laborers in Mexico. The story follows the love between the daughter of an aristocratic family fallen on hard times, and the son of a butcher.

== Background ==
The film tells the story of Korean people who were brought to Yucatán under false promises of a good life, including wealthy Koreans, but were instead forced to work as slaves by the Yucatán henequen industry landlords, which were proud Spanish descendants of the Yucatecan upper class. At that time, it was the main industry of the state of Yucatán and henequen was referred to as the "green gold", as it made many Yucatecan families very wealthy.

This part of history where Korean people were used as slaves under brutal conditions (and even killed), didn't appear in Yucatecan history books until recently. When the movie was filmed outside of Mérida, Yucatán, it became a real eye opener to Yucatecan society about the horrible abuse inflicted to Korean people decades ago, which they were not aware of.

The henequen plant, which produces the sisal fibre, is traditionally used for rope and twine, and is a fibrous plant from the state of Yucatán, in Mexico's Yucatán Peninsula.

== Cast ==
- Chang Mi-hee
- Yim Sung-min
- Kim Seong-su
- Kim Cheong
- No Yeong-guk
- Lee Jong-man
- Han Tae-il
- Joo Ho-sung
- Park Kwang-jin
- Hong Jeong-uk

== Bibliography ==
- "Henequen". The Complete Index to World Film. Archived from the original on 2012-09-08.

Preceded by The Eternal Empire	Grand Bell Awards for Best Film; 1996	Succeeded by The Contact
