= Kim Seungok =

South Korean novelist and screenwriter (born 1941)

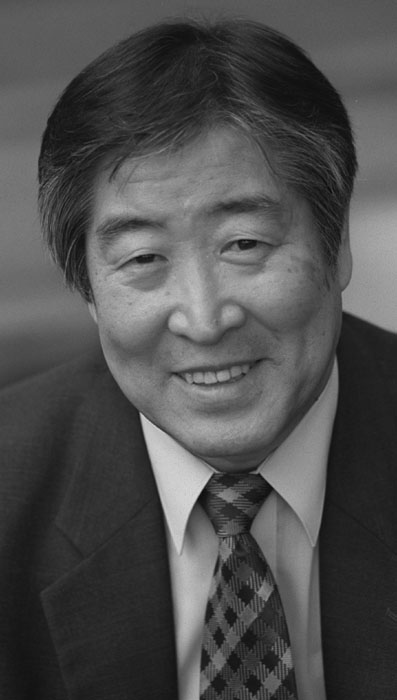
- Born: December 23, 1941 (age 84); Osaka, Japan
- Writing career
- Language: Korean
- Notable work: Seoul, Winter 1964

Korean name
- Hangul: 김승옥
- Hanja: 金承鈺
- RR: Gim Seungok
- MR: Kim Sŭngok

Kim Seungok (born 23 December 1941) is a South Korean novelist and screenwriter.

== Biography ==
Born in Osaka, Japan, Kim Seungok returned to Korea after its liberation in 1945. There, he was raised in Suncheon in South Jeolla Province where he graduated from Suncheon High School. In 1960, he studied French Literature at Seoul National University at a time that department and University were the center of intellectual discontent in Seoul. While at Seoul National University, Kim was a cartoonist for a Seoul newspaper and published his first major story at age 19 ("Practice for Life"). While a junior in 1962, Kim founded a literary Journal, The Age of Prose, and some of his first works were published there. Kim was an immediate literary success, a success that continued unabated until he was 25. His greatest success was "Seoul, Winter, 1964," a work that crystallized a Korean sense of loss and meaninglessness attendant to the industrialization of Korea and resulting nihilism. In 1967 one of his works, "Trip to Mujin," was adapted into the film Mist. Kim Seung-ok was the screenwriter, and director Kim Soo-yong won the Best Director award at the 14th Asia-Pacific Film Festival.

== Work ==
Kim is the quintessential outsider to systems, regardless of what systems he addressed. This was apparent in even his earliest works, which adopted the stance of romantic outsider. In his early works, Kim shows a burning desire to escape the bounds of quotidian existence; he often does this through fantasy or hallucination. However, Kim quickly began to recognize the strength of social constraints, and his works began to reflect an inability to exceed these constraints. Kim's stance turned towards distance and nihilism, in which there was no such thing as a dream. The romantic outsider is replaced by atomistic narrators in uncaring society. Later works all detail the anomic lives of narrators who are trapped by modernizing society. Finally, just before he retired from fiction entirely, Kim attempted to use erotic passion in somewhat the same way he had used hallucination/fantasy in his earlier works. Kim's stories in this vein were not well received. Kim also co-wrote several Korean movies including Woman and Insect Woman.

Kim was the first Korean writer to win both the Yi Sang Literature Prize (he won the inaugural award in 1977) and the Dong-in Literary Award (in 1965, for Seoul: 1964, Winter), but after 1967 his creative energies began to dissipate and in 1979 he quit writing fiction.

== Works in English ==
- Seoul: 1964, Winter in Land of Exile

== Works in Korean ==
- Fantasy Notebook (Hwansang sucheop,1962)
- Fifteen Certified Preconceptions (Hwaginhaebon yeoldaseot gaji gojeong gwannyeom)
- Operation (Saengmyeong yeonseup, 1962)
- A Journey to Mujin (Mujingihaeng, 1964)
- Seoul, Winter 1964 (Seoul, 1964 nyeon gyeoul, 1965)
- Journey by Night (Yahaeng)
- A Cup of Tea (Chana hanjan)
- Strong are the Goats (Yeomsoneun himi seda, 1966)
- The Moonlight in Seoul: Chapter 0 (Seourui dalbit 0 jang)
- To Understand My Sister (Nuirul ihaehagi wihayeo, 1963)
- Our Low Fence (Woorideului Nateun Wultari, 1979)
- God I Have Met (Naega Mannan Hananim, 2004)

== Awards ==
- Dong-in Literary Award (1965)
- Yi Sang Literary Award (1977)
