= A Dream of Good Fortune =

Short story by Hwang Sok-yong

- Short story by Hwang Sok-yong (황석영)
- Country: South Korea
- Language: Korean
- Genre: Realism

Publication
- Published in: 1973

"A Dream of Good Fortune" (Korean: 돼지 꿈, romanized: Dwaeji Kkum, lit. 'Pig Dream') was written by Korean author Hwang Sok-yong (황석영) and originally published in Sedae magazine in 1973 (Pihl, B. Fulton, and J. Fulton 102). The story is set in the outskirts of Seoul, South Korea, during a period of rapid industrialization and urbanization, and explores a day in the lives of the poor, working-class people that live as urban squatters outside nearby factories (Pihl, B. Fulton, and J. Fulton xi; Ch'o, Pang, and Chang 68).

== Background ==
When the short story was first published in 1973, South Korea was rapidly industrializing under the authoritarian leadership of President Park Chung Hee (Ch'o, Pang, and Chang 11-12; Robinson 129-131). When Park seized power in 1961, he began implementing an export-oriented economic strategy that was extraordinarily successful (Robinson 129; Eckert et al. 388; Ch'o, Pang, and Chang 14-15). A key element of the strategy's success was Park normalizing relations with Japan in 1965. Increased trade with Japan along with hundreds of millions of dollars of desperately needed capital in the form of grants, public loans, and commercial credits from the Japanese government helped Korea swiftly industrialize out of the cataclysmic destruction of the Korean War (Ch'o, Pang, and Chang 14-15; Eckert et al. 388, 392).

One effect of industrialization was an unprecedented increase in urbanization. Thousands of Koreans from the countryside poured into large cities where they often settled illegally on vacant land (Pihl, B. Fulton, and J. Fulton xi; Ch'o, Pang, and Chang 67; Eckert et al. 353; Mobrand 368). Many of these newly arrived labourers worked in factories under inhumane conditions and did not receive fair wages for their work (Ch'o, Pang, and Chang 67; Koo 58, 98; Eckert et al. 413-414). During this time there were sharp increases in per capita income that accompanied the breakneck economic growth, but a disproportionate amount of the new wealth went to entrepreneurs, not workers (Robinson 129; Eckert et al. 388, 413-414).

== Plot summary ==
The story is about a family who lives as urban squatters near the numerous factories located outside of Seoul. The family is headed by the father, Kang, and includes his wife, his wife's daughter, Misun, his wife's son, Kŭnho, and the couple's young son. Kang earns money by selling scavenged or stolen goods. Kŭnho works in the woodworking shop at a Japanese factory that produces television and radio cabinets. Misun worked at the local wig factory before she took out a large daily-interest loan and ran away from home.

The day begins with Kang boasting of his lucky day to his neighbors. He usually only makes 300-400 wŏn a day, but today is different. Kang resold some electric wire for an undisclosed sum and received 300 wŏn from a family to bury a dog corpse, but he has no intentions to bury the dog. Kang has not been able to afford any meat recently, so he decides to eat the dog later that day. After talking to his male neighbors, Kang decides to share the dog with them in exchange for their help cooking and their providing makkŏlli, Korean rice wine.

Kang returns home to find his wife in a foul mood. Her brother came by with Misun, who is discovered to be pregnant. Kang soon leaves after arguing with his wife about his stepdaughter's negative effect on his image as a father. The mother is furious at her daughter for taking out a loan and returning home pregnant. The mother wants Misun to have an abortion, but her Christian brother—and Misun—object. The mother compromises by persuading Misun to marry whomever the mother can find who will accept the baby. The family has barely enough money to survive, so the mother is distressed about how to provide for her unmarried pregnant daughter, pay back the loan, and pay for the wedding.

Meanwhile, Kang and his male neighbors are talking while preparing for their dog feast. As squatters, they are troubled because a nearby neighborhood of squatters had recently been leveled in the space of a day. The men discuss the tenuous future of their own shantytown. The neighborhood leader assures the worried men that their neighborhood will not be destroyed in the near future. In addition, he tells them that he has received confirmation that all the neighborhood households will receive fifty thousand wŏn in relocation aid because of the age of their neighborhood. One of the neighborhood men notices the gathering and drops by on his way to get noodles for his liquor stand.

When the neighbor returns to his stand with the noodles, he soon sees Kŭnho. After work, Kŭnho came to the stand for drinks with a bandage on his hand. Angry about his sister's predicament, he talks crudely to some factory girls and sings a gloomy song about the plight of a poor factory boy. Then Kŭnho wanders the streets drunk. When Kŭnho makes it home, Kang's wife finds out that her son lost three fingers in an accident at work, but instead of being distraught, she is glad, because now she can use his compensation money for Misun's marriage. Inside the house, a local suitor that Kang's wife found (but who is in fact Kang's boss) comes to ask Misun to marry him, and Misun accepts his proposal.

The story ends with the suitor going outside to where Kang and the neighbors are finishing their party. Having eaten dog soup and gotten drunk on makkŏli, some of the men are singing, and some are dancing. The story ends with the suitor informing Kang that he will be Kang's new son-in-law.

== Translations ==
The short story was translated by Marshall R. Pihl, Bruce Fulton, and Ju-Chan Fulton. It was published along with other short stories in Land of Exile: Contemporary Korean Fiction (ISBN 978-0765618108). The collection has been highly praised for the quality of the stories and the accuracy of the translations (Epstein 579; McCann 213; Stephens 268).

== Bibliography ==
- 방, 민호, and 종균 장. 서울대 교수진이 내놓은 통합 논술: 돼지꿈 황석영. Ed. 남현 조. 6th ed. 서울: Houyhnhnm, 2011. Print.
- Eckert, Carter J., Ki-baik Lee, Young Ick Lew, Michael Robinson, and Edward W. Wagner. Korea, Old and New: A History. Seoul, Korea: Ilchokak, 1990. Print.
- Epstein, Stephen. "Review." Rev. of Land of Exile: Contemporary Korean Fiction by Marshall R. Pihl, Bruce Fulton, and Ju-chan Fulton. The Journal of Asian Studies May 1994: 578-79. Print.
- Koo, Hagen. Korean Workers: The Culture and Politics of Class Formation. Ithaca: Cornell UP, 2001. Print.
- McCann, David R. (1995). "Land of Exile: Contemporary Korean Fiction (review)". Korean Studies. 19 (1): 213–218. doi:10.1353/ks.1995.0024. JSTOR 23719157. S2CID 162402688. Project MUSE 397978 ProQuest 1311655138.
- Mobrand, Erik. "Struggles over Unlicensed Housing in Seoul, 1960-80." Urban Studies 45.2 (2008): 367-89. Print.
- Pihl, Marshall R., Bruce Fulton, and Ju-Chan Fulton. Land of Exile: Contemporary Korean Fiction. Expanded ed. Armonk, NY: M.E. Sharpe/UNESCO Pub., 2007. Print.
- Robinson, Michael E. Korea's Twentieth-Century Odyssey: A Short History. Honolulu: University of Hawaiʻi, 2007. Print.
- Stephens, Michael. "Review." Rev. of Land of Exile: Contemporary Korean Fiction by Marshall R. Pihl, Bruce Fulton, and Ju-Chan Fulton. Manoa 1994: 267-68. Print.
