= Hwang Sok-yong =

South Korean novelist (born 1943)

- 황석영
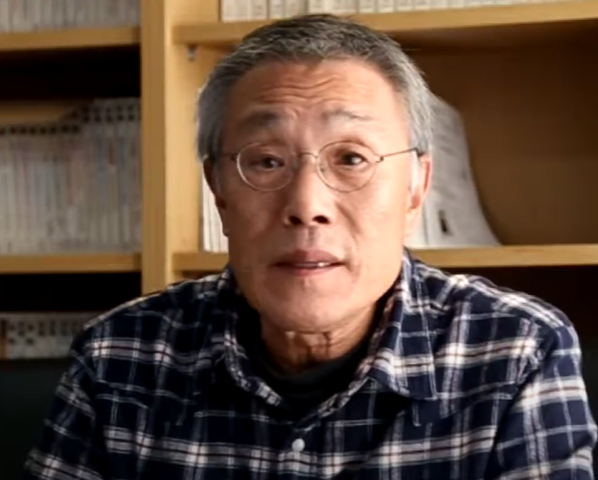
- Hwang in 2014
- Born: Hwang Soo-yong; January 4, 1943 (age 83)
- Citizenship: South Korea
- Education: Dongguk University
- Occupation: Novelist
- Writing career
- Pen name: Hwang Sok-yong
- Language: Korean
- Website: blog.naver.com/hkilsan/

- Korean name
- Hangul: 황석영
- Hanja: 黃晳暎
- RR: Hwang Seokyeong
- MR: Hwang Sŏgyŏng

Hwang Sok-yong (Korean: 황석영; born January 4, 1943) is a South Korean novelist.

== Biography ==
Hwang was born in Xinjing (today Changchun), Manchukuo, during the period of Japanese rule. His family returned to Korea after liberation in 1945. He later obtained a bachelor's degree in philosophy from Dongguk University.

Hwang has been an avid reader of a wide range of literature and he wanted to become a writer since childhood.

In the fourth year of primary school, I wrote something for 'creative writing class'. It was chosen to be entered into a national contest, and won the top prize. It was the story of someone returning home after having fled south during the Korean war; the title was 'Homecoming Day'. Having come home, the protagonist finds that the whole village has been left in ruins, in the wake of the war's devastation. My story described the afternoon he spends sorting through the plates and household goods in his home. That was the first time I received praise from a wider community, and I decided that when I grew up, instead of a fireman or a soldier I was going to be a 'writer', though I wasn't completely sure what this meant. I thought that writing was something you did with the buttocks; because you have to spend a long time sitting at your desk.

In 1964, he was jailed for political reasons and met labor activists. Upon his release he worked at a cigarette factory and at several construction sites around the country.

In 1966–1969, he was part of the Republic of Korea Marine Corps during the Vietnam War, reluctantly fighting for the American cause that he saw as an attack on a liberation struggle:

What difference was there between my father's generation, drafted into the Japanese army or made to service Imperial Japan's pan-Asian ambitions, and my own, unloaded into Vietnam by the Americans in order to establish a "Pax Americana" zone in the Far East during the ColdWar?

In Vietnam he was responsible for "clean-up", erasing the proof of civilian massacres and burying the dead. A gruesome experience in which he was constantly surrounded by corpses that were gnawed by rats and abuzz with flies. Based on these experiences he wrote the short story "The Pagoda" in 1970, which won the daily newspaper Chosun Ilbo's new year prize, and embarked on an adult literary career.

His first novel Mr. Han's Chronicle, the story of a family separated by the Korean War, was published in 1970. The novel is still relevant after Kim Dae-jung's visit to North Korea and meeting with Kim Jong Il led to reunions of separated families and talk of reunification. Mr. Han's Chronicle was translated into French by Zulma in 2002.

Hwang published a collection of stories, On the Road to Sampo in 1974, and became a household name with his epic, Jang Gilsan, which was serialized in a daily newspaper over a period of ten years (1974-84). Using the parable of a bandit from olden times ("parables are the only way to foil the censors") to describe the contemporary dictatorship, Chang Kil-san was a huge success in North as well as South Korea. It sold an estimated million copies and remains a bestseller in Korean fiction.

Hwang also wrote for the theater, and several members of a company were killed while performing one of his plays during the 1980 Gwangju Uprising. During this time, he went from being a politically committed writer revered by students and intellectuals, to participating directly in the struggle. As he said:

I fought Park Chung-hee's dictatorship. I worked in the factories and farms of Cholla, and I took part in the movements of the masses throughout the country . . . in 1980, I took part in the Gwangju uprising. I improvised plays, wrote pamphlets and songs, coordinated a group of writers against the dictatorship, and started a clandestine radio station called "The voice of free Kwangju.

The 1985 appearance of Lee Jae-eui's book Beyond Death, Beyond the Darkness of Age (English translation: Gwangju Diary: Beyond Death, Beyond the Darkness of Age, 1999) brought new trouble: Hwang originally agreed to take credit as the author to help market the book, and both Hwang as the assumed author and the publisher were arrested and sent to prison. Hwang's substantial and award-winning novel based on his bitter experience of the Vietnam War, The Shadow of Arms was published in 1985. It was translated into English in 1994 and French in 2003. In 1989, he illegally traveled to Pyongyang, North Korea, via Tokyo and Beijing as a representative of the nascent democratic movement.

Rather than return to South Korea, he went into voluntary exile in New York, lecturing at Long Island University. He also spent time in Germany, which he found transformational.

In 1993, he returned to Seoul because "a writer needs to live in the country of his mother tongue" and was promptly sentenced to seven years in prison for breach of the National Security Law. While in prison, he conducted 18 hunger strikes against restrictions such as the banning of pens and inadequate nutrition.

Organizations around the world including PEN America and Amnesty International rallied for his release and the author was finally pardoned in 1998 as part of a group amnesty by newly elected President Kim Dae-jung. When asked whether the regime that freed him recognized his work and even sent him on an official visit to North Kores as part of a policy of opening up and promoting dialogue was a democracy, he replied:

At the time I received a seven year prison sentence for violating the 'National Security Law', and although Amnesty International and International PEN campaigned for prisoners' writing rights, which was also actively supported by the UN Human Rights Commission, I ultimately failed to obtain those rights. In 1998 Kim Dae-jung was elected as president and effected a shift in government, so I was released after only five years thanks to his special pardon. My 'realist narrative' was a way beyond the division which 'I' creates, and towards the universality of the world

Hwang Sok-yong published his next novel, The Old Garden, in 2000. It was published in German in fall 2005 by DTV and in French by Zulma. The English-language edition, called The Old Garden, was published in September 2009 by Seven Stories Press and subsequently in the UK by Picador Asia under the title The Ancient Garden. The early chapters of the book are being serialized online.

The Guest, a novel about a massacre in North Korea wrongly attributed to Americans that was carried out by Christian Koreans, was published in 2002. It was translated into French in 2004 and Seven Stories brought out the English-language edition to critical acclaim in 2005. The "guest" is a euphemism for smallpox, or an unwanted visitor that brings death and destruction.

In December 2013, Seven Stories published his novel The Shadow of Arms. A novel based on the author's experience in Korea's military corps fighting America's war in Vietnam, it reveals the regional economic motivations for the conflict within the larger Cold War.

In 2024 Hwang's book Mater 2-10 longlisted for the International Booker Prize 2024.

== Work ==
Hwang defined the reality of Korea as a "nation-wide state of homelessness", and has continuously explored the psychology of the people who have lost their "homes", symbolic or real. "Home", to Hwang Sok-yong, is not simply a place where you were born and raised but a community life rooted in the feeling of solidarity. This idea of home is also the basis for Hwang's attempt to reveal social contradictions through peripheral or foreign people. Hwang's literary tendencies are strongly linked on his personal experiences. "For the Little Brother' (Aureul wihayeo, 1972), "The Light of Twilight" (Noeurui bit, 1973) and "Passionate Relationship" (Yeorae, 1988) are the stories of the author's adolescence, which embraces issues such as rejections of one's parents, hatred of competition, and the feeling of humanity and solidarity shared by the people at the periphery of the society.

Hwang's work can be divided into three categories. The first deals with the loss of humanity and devastation of life due to modernization, war, and the military system; The second category expresses the desire to reclaim healthy life and rejuvenate damaged values and; the third are in the category of historical novel.

== Works in translation ==
- "A Dream of Good Fortune" (1973, translated in the anthology Land of Exile: Contemporary Korean Fiction)
- The Guest (Seven Stories, 2006)
- The Ancient Garden (Pan Macmillan Hardback, 2009)
- The Old Garden (Seven Stories Press, 2012)
- The Shadow Of Arms (Seven Stories, 2014)
- Princess Bari (Periscope, 2015)
- Familiar Things (Scribe UK, 2017)
- At Dusk (Scribe, 2018)
- The Prisoner (Verso, 2021)
- Mater 2-10 (Scribe, 2023)

== Works in Korean (selected) ==
- Strange Land (Gaekji, 1971)
- Mr. Han's Chronicle (Hanssi yeondaegi, 1972)
- On the Road to Sampo (Sampo ganeun gil, 1973)
- Dream of a Hercules (Jangsaui kkum, 1974)
- The Shadow of Arms (Mugiui geuneul, 1985)
- The Ancient Garden (Oraedoen jeongwon, 2000)
- The Guest (Sonnim, 2001)
- The Children of Moraenmal (Moraenmal aideul, 2001)
- Simcheong, The Lotus Path (Simcheong, yeonkkot-ui gil, 2007)
- Princess Bari (2007)
- Evening Star (Gaebapbaragibyeol, 2008)
- Gangnam Dream (Gangnammong, 2010)
- A Familiar Life (Natikeun sesang, 2011)
- Sound of the Rapids (Yeoulmul sori, 2012)
- At Dusk (Haejil Muryeop, 2015)

Multi-volume saga,

- Jang Gilsan (Jang Gilsan 1974-1984)

== Awards ==
- Manhae Literary Prize (1989)
- Danjae Literary Prize (2000)
- Isan Literary Prize (2000)
- Daesan Literature Prize (2001, for The Guest)
- Manhae Literary Award Grand Prize (2004)
- Korea Culture and Arts Foundation 'This Year's' Art Prize (2004)
- Mark of Respect Award (2008)
- Prix Emile-Guimet (2018).

== See also ==
- Korean literature
- List of Korean novelists
