= The Hymn of Death =

2018 South Korean television series

- Promotional poster
- Also known as: The Hymn of Death; Death Song
- Hangul: 사의 찬미
- Lit.: Praise of Death
- RR: Saui chanmi
- MR: Saŭi ch'anmi
- Genre: Historical; Romance; Tragedy; Melodrama
- Written by: Jo Soo-jin
- Directed by: Park Soo-jin
- Starring: Lee Jong-suk; Shin Hye-sun
- Country of origin: South Korea
- Original language: Korean
- No. of episodes: 6 (Note: In order to circumvent Korean laws that prevent commercial breaks in the middle of an episode, what would previously have been aired as single 70 minute episodes are now being repackaged as two 35 minute episodes, with two episodes being shown each night with a commercial break between the two.)

Production
- Camera setup: Single-camera
- Running time: 35 minutes
- Production company: The Story Works

Original release
- Network: SBS TV
- Release: November 27 – December 4, 2018

The Hymn of Death (Korean: 사의 찬미; RR: Saui chanmi) is a 2018 South Korean television miniseries based on true events, starring Lee Jong-suk and Shin Hye-sun. It aired on SBS from November 27 to December 4, 2018, and is available on Netflix worldwide.

== Synopsis ==
The series depicts the tragic romance between Joseon's first soprano Yun Sim-deok (Shin Hye-sun) and the genius playwright, Kim Woo-jin (Lee Jong-suk).

== Cast ==
=== Main ===
- Lee Jong-suk as Kim Woo-jin
- Shin Hye-sun as Yun Sim-deok

=== Supporting ===
==== Woo-jin's family ====
- Kim Myeong-su as Kim Sung-gyu (Woo-jin's father)
- Park Sun-im as Jung Chum-hyo (Woo-jin's wife)

==== Sim-deok's family ====
- Kim Won-hae as Yoon Suk-ho (Sim-deok's father)
- Hwang Young-hee as Kim Ssi (Sim-deok's mother)
- Go Bo-gyeol as Yoon Sung-duk (Sim-deok's younger sister)
- Shin Jae-ha as Yoon Ki-sung (Sim-deok's younger brother)

==== People of Dong Woo-hee Theater ====
- Lee Ji-hoon as Hong Nan-pa
- Jung Moon-sung as Jo Myung-hee
- Oh Eui-shik as Hong Hae-sung
- Lee Joon-yi as Kyosuke Tomoda (new Japanese actor)
- Han Eun-seo as Han Ki-joo (Soprano, piano player)

==== People around Sim-deok ====
- Lee Sang-yeob as Gim Hong-gi
- Jang Hyun-sung as Lee Yong-moon
- Lee Cheol-min as government officer
- Kim Kang-hyun as Lee Seo-koo
- Jang Hyuk-jin as Dauchi
- Bae Hae-sun as Vocal Music Professor

== Production ==
The first script reading took place on March 27, 2018. The filming began in late April, 2018.

The drama serves as a reunion between Lee Jong-suk and Shin Hye-sun who previously worked together on the KBS drama School 2013 (2013).

== Original soundtrack ==
The Hymn of Death OST

Soundtrack album by Various artists
- Recorded: 2018
- Genre: Soundtrack
- Languages: Korean; English
- Label: Danal Entertainment

=== Part 1 ===
Released on November 27, 2018
No.	Title	Lyrics	Music	Artist	Length
1.	"The Heart Only Knows" (가슴만 알죠)	Hong Jin-young	Hong Jin-young	Sohyang	5:03
2.	"The Heart Only Knows" (Inst.)		Hong Jin-young		5:03
Total length:					10:06

=== Part 2 ===
Released on December 3, 2018
No.	Title	Lyrics	Music	Artist	Length
1.	"Stay With Me"	Oh Sung-hoon; LONG CANDY	Oh Sung-hoon; Lee Hyuck-joon	Song Ha-ye	3:45
2.	"Stay With Me" (Inst.)		Oh Sung-hoon; Lee Hyuck-joon		3:45
Total length:					7:30

=== Part 3 ===
Released on December 4, 2018
No.	Title	Lyrics	Music	Artist	Length
1.	"Falling In Love"	Oh Sung-hoon; LONG CANDY	Oh Sung-hoon; Park Ga-young	Hynn	3:45
2.	"Falling In Love" (Inst.)		Oh Sung-hoon; Park Ga-young		3:45
Total length:					7:30

== Viewership ==
The Hymn of Death : South Korea viewers per episode (thousands)

Season	Episode number						Average
Season	1	2	3	4	5	6	Average
1	1316	1194	N/A	932	N/A	948	N/A

Source: Audience measurement performed nationwide by Nielsen Media Research.

Average TV viewership ratings
Ep.	Original broadcast date	Average audience share		
Ep.	Original broadcast date	Nielsen Korea		TNmS
Ep.	Original broadcast date	Nationwide	Seoul	Nationwide
1	November 27, 2018	7.4% (10th)	8.3% (9th)	5.9%
2	November 27, 2018	7.8% (9th)	8.9% (6th)	6.5%
3	December 3, 2018	4.7% (NR)	N/A	4.2%
4	December 3, 2018	5.6% (NR)	N/A	5.1%
5	December 4, 2018	4.7% (NR)	N/A	N/A
6	December 4, 2018	6.2% (16th)	7.0% (14th)	N/A
Average		6.1%	— (Note: Due to some ratings not being recorded, the exact average rating is unknown.)	—
In the table above, the blue numbers represent the lowest ratings and the red numbers represent the highest ratings.; NR denotes that the series did not rank in the top 20 daily programs on that date.; N/A denotes that the rating is not known.
