= Lee Man-hee (director) =

South Korean film director

- Born: October 6, 1931; Seoul, South Korea
- Died: April 13, 1975 (aged 43)
- Occupation: Film director
- Spouse: Moon Sook (1974-1975)
- Children: Lee Hye-young

Korean name
- Hangul: 이만희
- Hanja: 李晩熙
- RR: I Manhui
- MR: I Manhŭi

Lee Man-hee (October 6, 1931 – April 13, 1975) was a South Korean film director who worked prominently in South Korea's film industry during the 1960s and early 1970s. His works include Assassin (1969). He died in 1975 from liver cancer. His daughter, Lee Hye-young, is an actress.

== Movies ==
- Kaleidoscope (1961)
- A Disobedient Son (1961)
- Call 112 (1962)
- Until I Die (1962)
- Don't Look Back (1963)
- The Marines Who Never Returned (1963)
- The Twelve Nyang Life (1963)
- Han Seok-bong (1963)
- Soldiers of YMS504 (1963)
- Where Can I Stand? (1964)
- The Evil Stairs (aka The Devil's Stairway) (1964)
- The Intimidator (1964)
- Black Hair (1964)
- The Chaser (1964)
- Myohyang's Elegy (1964)
- Market (1965)
- Heukmaek (1965)
- The Seven Female POW's (1965)
- Heilong River (1965)
- A Hero without Serial Number (1966)
- Late Autumn (1966)
- Unforgettable Woman (1966)
- A Water Mill (1966)
- Swindler Mr. Heo (1967)
- Legend of Ssarigol (1967)
- Oblivion (1967)
- Horror of Triangle (1967)
- Coming Back (1967)
- A Spotted Man (1967)
- The Starting Point (1967)
- Heat and Cold (1967)
- Whistle (1967)
- Harimao in Bangkok (1967)
- Outing (1968)
- Living in the Sky (1968)
- A Journey (1968)
- A Day Off (1968)
- Assassin (1969)
- Life (1969)
- Confess of Woman (1969)
- Six Shadows (1969)
- Goboi gangui dari (1970)
- Break Up the Chain (1971)
- The Midnight Sun (1972)
- 4 o'clock, Nineteen Fifty (1972)
- Japanese Pirate (1972)
- Cheongnyeo (1974)
- The Wild Flowers in the Battle Field (1974)
- A Girl Who Looks Like the Sun (1974)
- A Triangular Trap (1974)
- The Road to Sampo (1975)
