= Kim Ho-sun (director) =

South Korean filmmaker (born 1941)

- Born: 9 March 1941 (age 85); South Hamgyong Province
- Occupations: Film director, producer, screenwriter
- Years active: 1964–1996

Korean name
- Hangul: 김호선
- Hanja: 金鎬善
- RR: Gim Hoseon
- MR: Kim Hosŏn

Kim Ho-sun (Korean: 김호선; born 9 March 1941) is a South Korean film director, producer, and screenwriter who has enjoyed both critical and box office success.

== Biography ==
Kim Ho-sun was born on 9 March 1941 in South Hamgyong Province, now part of North Korea. He dropped out of Kyung Hee University and made his directorial debut in 1974 with Hwannyeo.

A member of the so-called "Visual Age" of Korean directors, Kim made some of the bestselling Korean films of the 1970s. The local Korean cinema industry in the 1970s had to face the challenges of foreign imports, increased television ownership, and the stifling censorship of the military dictatorship of Park Chung Hee.

Kim began his directing career making what are known as "hostess films," one of the few genres that the censors allowed some latitude to, these were melodramas that portrayed the lives of bargirls and their milieu. Kim showed that despite the formulaic restrictions the censors placed on filmmaking, locally made films could still be individual and sell well, and in doing so inspired his fellow filmmakers. In terms of tickets sold, Winter Woman that he directed in 1977 was the bestselling domestic film of the 1970s, and would hold the record until General's Son in 1990.

Since 2007, Kim has been a senior advisor to the Korea Film Directors' Society (KFDS).

== Filmography ==
Year	English Title	Hangul	Romanization	Credited as
1964	The Modern Grandma	신식할머니	Sinsik Halmeoni	Assistant director
1972	The Pollen of Flowers	화분	Hwabun	Assistant director
1974	Hwannyeo	환녀 (宦女)	Hwannyeo	Director
1975	Yeong-ja's Heydays	영자의 전성시대	Yeongja-ui jeonseongsidae	Director, Screenwriter
1976	Cuckoo's Dolls	여자들만 사는 거리	Yeojadeulman saneun geoli	Director
1977	Journey by Night	야행	Yahaeng	Assistant director
1977	Winter Woman	겨울여자	Gyeo-ul-yeoja	Director
1979	The Sleep Deeper Than Death	죽음보다 깊은 잠	Jug-eumboda gip-eun jam	Director
1980	Admiration of Nights	밤의 찬가	Bam-ui changa	Director
1981	Shorter Three Times, Longer Three Times	영자의 전성시대	Sebeon-eun jjalbge sebeon-eun gilge	Director, Screenwriter
1982	Ardent Love	열애	Yeol-ae	Director, Screenwriter
1983	Winter Woman 2	겨울여자(2부)	Gyeowul yeoja je2bu	Director
1986	My Daughter Saved from Den of Evil 2	수렁에서 건진 내딸 2	Suleong-eseo geonjin naettal 2	Director, Screenwriter, Producer
1988	Paris Emma	파리애마	Pari Aema	Producer
1989	Rainbow Over Seoul	서울무지개	Seoul mujigae	Director
1990	The Song of Crazy Love	미친사랑의 노래	Michin salang-ui nolae	Director
1991	Death Song	사의 찬미	Sa-ui chanmi	Director, Costume assistant
1993	When Adam Opens His Eyes	아담이 눈뜰 때		Director
1996	Henequen	애니깽	Aenikkaeng	Director, Screenwriter, Producer

== Awards and nominations ==
Year	Awarding body	Category	Nominated work	Result
1981	Korean Association of Film Critics Awards	Best Film	Shorter Three Times, Longer Three Times	Won
1981	Korean Association of Film Critics Awards	Best Director	Shorter Three Times, Longer Three Times	Won
1989	Korean Association of Film Critics Awards	Best Film	Rainbow Over Seoul	Won
1989	Korean Association of Film Critics Awards	Best Director	Rainbow Over Seoul	Won
1989	Grand Bell Awards	Best Director	Rainbow Over Seoul	Won
1991	Chunsa Film Art Awards	Best Film	Death Song	Won
1991	Blue Dragon Film Awards	Best Film	Death Song	Won
1992	Grand Bell Awards	Best Director	Death Song	Won
1996	Korean Association of Film Critics Awards	Best Director	Henequen	Won
1996	Grand Bell Awards	Best Film	Henequen	Won
1996	Grand Bell Awards	Best Director	Henequen	Won
