= Namkoong Won =

South Korean actor (1934–2024)

- 남궁원
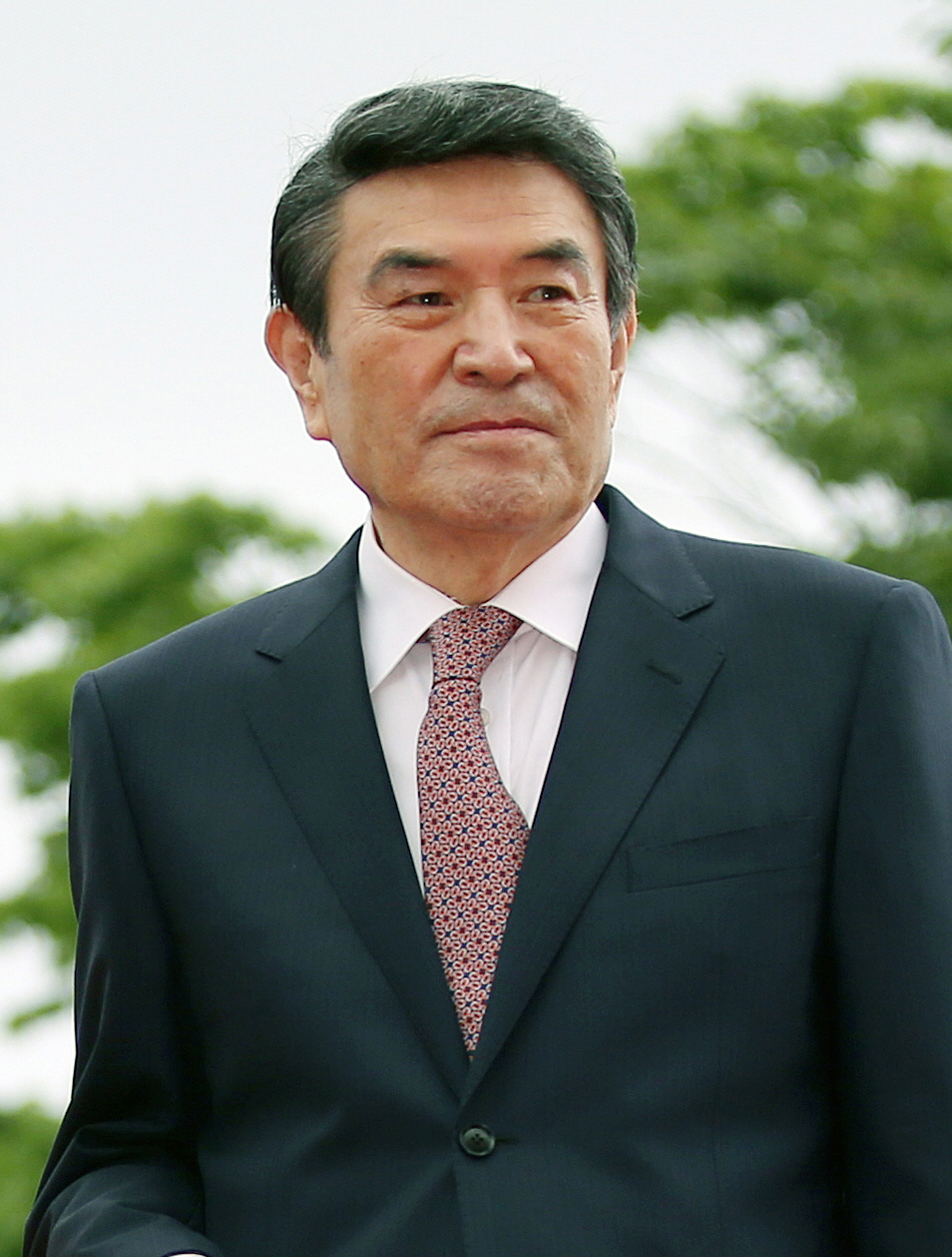
- Namkoong in 2014
- Born: 1 August 1934; Yangpyeong County, Keiki-dō, Korea, Empire of Japan
- Died: 5 February 2024 (aged 89); Seoul, South Korea
- Occupation: Actor
- Years active: 1959–2024
- Children: 3, including Hong Jung-wook

Korean name
- Hangul: 홍경일
- RR: Hong Gyeongil
- MR: Hong Kyŏngil

Stage name
- Hangul: 남궁원
- Hanja: 南宮遠
- RR: Namgung Won
- MR: Namgung Wŏn

Namkoong Won (Korean: 남궁원; 1 August 1934 – 5 February 2024) was a South Korean actor. Namkoong was born Hong Gyeong-il in 1934. He was a popular actor of the 1960s along with Shin Seong-il, Shin Young-kyun and Choi Moo-ryong. His son was South Korean politician, Hong Jung-wook. Namkoong died from cancer at the Asan Medical Center in Seoul, on 5 February 2024, at the age of 89.

He was nicknamed "the Gregory Peck of Korea" due to his physical resemblance to the American actor.

== Filmography ==
* Note; the whole list is referenced.

Year	English title	Korean title	Romanization	Role	Director
2003	Cotton	무명			
	Saulabi	싸울아비			
	L'AMOUR	애	Ae		
	Crazy Dance	크레이지 댄스	Kre-ijidaenseu		
	Piano in the Winter	피아노가 있는 겨울	Pianoga issneun gyeo-ul		
	Secret	비설	Biseol		
	The President's Daughter	대통령의 딸	Daetonglyeong-ui ttal		
	My Father, the Bodyguard	아빠는 보디가드	Appaneun bodigadeu		
	The Wings of Heroes	영웅들의 날개짓	Yeoung-ungdeul-ui nalgaejis		
	The Man with Breasts	가슴달린 남자	Gaseumdallin namja		
	Dangerous Level	위험수위	Wiheomsu-wi		
	The One and Only Life I Have	오직 단 한번뿐인 내인생인데	Ojig dan hanbeonppun-in nae-insaeng-inde		
	The Emperor of Cash	돈황제	Donhwangje		
	The Maiden Scriptures	소녀경	Sonyeogyeong		
	The Swamp Haze Will Not Clear	늪속에 불안개는 잠들지 않는다	Neupsog-e bul-angaeneun jamdeulji anhneunda		
	Tears of Seoul	서울의 눈물	Seo-ul-ui nunmul		
	A Pale Rainy Day	하얀 비요일	Ha-yan bi-yo-il		
	Robot Taekwon V 90	로버트 태권브이 90	Loboteu Taegwonbeu-i 90		
	The Gray City 2	회색도시2	Hoesaegdosi 2		
	Bet, Regardless of Losing	못먹어도 고	Mot-meokeodo go		
	Miri, Mari, Wuri, Duri	미리 마리 우리 두리	Miri, Mari, Wuri, Duri		
	The Last Dance with Her	그녀와의 마지막 춤을	Geuneuwa-ui majimakchum-uil		
	Byon Gang-soi	가루지기	Garujigi		
	Karma	업	Eop		
	A Second Sex	제2의 성	Je2ui seong		
	Sexual Compatibility	합궁	Habgung		
	Mountain Snake	산배암	Sanbae-am		
	Wuroi-mae and Mobilization of Thunder-V	우뢰매 4탄 썬더브이 출동	Wuroemae 4tan sseondeobeu-i chuldong		
	Prince Yeon-san	연산군	Yeonsangun		
	Woman is Wind, Woman is Wind	여자는 바람 여자는 바람	Yeojaneun baram, Yeojaneun baram		
	Slaves	사노	Sano		
	Do-hwa	도화	Dohwa		
	School Days	합창보고서	Hakchang bogoseo		
	Janus' Lady of Fire	야누스의 불꽃 여자	Yanus-ui bulkkoch-yeoja		
	Frozen Sea	빙해	Binghae		
	Forget-me-nots	물망초	Mulmangcho Nareul iss-ji maseyo		
1986	No Regret	젊은 밤 후회없다	Jeolmeunbam huhoe-eobda		
	Colorful Scandal	삼색스캔들	Samsaek seukaendeul		
	Eunuch	내시	Naesi		
1986	Little Big Man	작은 고추	Jakeun gochu		
	My Daughter Saved from Den of Evil 2	수렁에서 건진 내딸 2	Suleong-eseo geonjin naettal 2		
	To J	제이에게	Je-i-ege		
	My Daughter Rescued from the Swamp	수렁에서 건진 내딸	Suleong-eseo geonjin naettal		
	A Weird Relationship	이상한 관계	I-sanghan gwangye		
	The Oldest Son	장남	Jangnam		
	The Miss and the Cadet	아가씨와 사관	Agassi-wa sagwan		
	Autumn At Nineteen	열아홉살의 가을	Yeol-a-hopsal-ui gaeul		
	The Flower at the Equator	적도의 꽃	Jeokdo-ui kkoch		
	A Woman's Outing	외출	Woechul		
	Madam Oh's Day Out	오마담의 외출	O-madam-ui oe-chul		
	The Memo of a 21-year-old		Seumeulhana-ui bimangrok		
	Heungnam City That I Saw Last		Naega majimak bon heungnam		
	A Time To Love, A Time To Part		Saranggal ttaewa he-eojil ttae		
	Tragic Love		Biryeon		
	Wind, Wind, Wind		Baram Baram Baram		
	Love and Farewell		Sarang grigo i-byeol		
1982	Inchon	인천	Incheon		Terence Young
	Doe	Amsaseum			
	A Forbidden Love		Geumjidoen sarang		
	Abengo Airborne Corps		Abengo gongsugundan		
	I Did Love		Naega salanghaessda		
	Mountain Strawberries		Santtalgi		
	Lost Youth		Beoryeojin cheongchun		
	The Woman Who Left Home		Jib-eul na-on yeo-in		
	The Married Woman		Yubunyeo		
	Subzero Point '81		Bingjeom '81		
	Liberal Wife '81		Ja-yubu-in '81		
	The Haunted Villa		Gwihwasanjang		
	Wild Woman		Yaseong-ui cheonyeo		
	The Hut		Pimag		
	Zero Woman		0nyeo		
	The Third Han-gang Bridge		Je3 hanganggyo		
	The Trumpeter		Napalsu		
	The Hey Days of Youth 77		Maenbal-ui cheongchun 77		
	Naked Woman		Nanyeo		
	The Light Goes Off In Your Window		Neo-ui chang-e bul-i kkeojigo		
	A Woman After a Killer Butterfly		Sal-innabileul jjochneun yeoja		
	Chu-ha, My Love		Chu Ha naesalang		
	Battle of Eagle		Dogsulijeonseon		
	Feelings		Yujeong		
	Wonsan Secret Operation		Wonsangongjag		
	I Love Mama		A-ileobeu mama 0		
	Lust		Yogmang		
	Truth of Tomorrow		Nae-il-eun jinsil		
	A Spy Remaining Behind		anlyucheobja		
	A True Story of Kim Du-Han		Sillog Gim Duhan		
	Ecstasy		Hwanghol		
	First Snow		Sinseol		
	Sweet Wind		Yeonpung		
	Under the Sky of Sakhalin		Sahallin-ui haneulgwa ttang		
	Cheongnyeo		Cheongnyeo		
	The Sun Rises at Night		Bam-e tteuneun tae-yang		
	Wet Lips in Rain		Bi-e jeoj-eun ibsul		
	An Inmate		Donggeo-in		
	My Heart is Blue Sky		Ma-eum-eun puleun haneul		
1973	Black Bird		Heugjo		
	The Wolves		Neugdaedeul		
	Three Days of Their Reign		Sam-ilcheonha		
	A Lodger's Life		Hasug-insaeng		
	Jongya		Jong-ya		
	Bae Jeong-Ja, A Femme Fatale		Yohwa Bae Jeongja		
	A She-sailor		Cheonyeosagong		
	Senoya Senoya		Seno-ya Seno-ya		
	Love and Hatred		Dajeongdahan		
	Lovers of Seoul		Seo-ul-ui yeon-in		
	At the Age of 18		Bangnyeon 18se		
	A Wonderful Life		Meosjin insaeng		
	To Judge One's Beloved Son		Salanghaneun adeul-ui simpan		
	Diary of a Debauchee		Milnyeo		
	Chungnyeo		Chungnyeo		
	The Pollen of Flowers		Hwabun		
	Farewell		Jagbyeol		
	Don't Forget Love Although We Say Goodbye		He-eojyeodo salangman-eun		
	Drum Sound of Sae Nam Teo		Saenamteo-ui bugsoli		
1972	Don't Go		Gajima-o		
	Mother		Eomeoni		
1971	Cotton	무명			
	New Year's Soup		Tteoggug		
	Glad to Say Goodbye		Hangboghan ibyeol		
	I Miss You Forever		Mos-ij-eul dangsin		
	The Graduation from Myeongdong		Myeongdongjol-eobsaeng		
	War and Human Being		Jeonjaenggwa ingan		
	Twelve Women		Yeoldu yeo-in		
	Two Women Pent Up With Grudge		Hanmanh-eun du yeo-in		
	The International Crime Organization		Gugje-amsaldan		
	Two Daughters		Du ttal		
	Break up the Chain		Soesaseul-euld kkeunh-eola		
	Woman of Fire		Hwanyeo		
	The First Love		Cheosjeong		
	When Flowers Sadly Fade Away		Seulpeun kkoch-ip-i jil ttae		
	Poisonous Butterfly		Dognabi		
	Beautiful Korea		Aleumda-un paldogangsan		
	Love		Ae		
	Woman in the Deluxe Suite		Teughosil yeojasonnim		
	Tears of an Angel		Cheonsa-ui nunmul		
	Blue Bedroom		Puleun chimsil		
	Jang, the Knife		Naipeu Jang		
	Pil-nyeo		Pilnyeo		
	Haunted Bedroom		Ma-ui chimsil		
	Affair on the Beach		Haebyeon-ui jeongsa		
	Harbin at Sunset		Seog-yang-ui Haleubin		
	Love Takes It All		Yujeonggeomhwa		
	The Invincible of the Far East		Geugdong-ui mujeogja		
	Minbi and Magic Sword		Minbi-wa mageom		
	An Idiot Judge		Hopipansa		
	Yearning for a Lover		Imgeuli-wo		
	Answer My Question		Daedabhae juse-yo		
	Dance with My Father		Appa-wa hamkke chum-eul		
	Men of the Reserve Troops		Yebigun paldo sana-i		
	Put Some Clothes on Her		Geu yeoja-ege os-eul ibhyeola		
	A Woman in the Wall II		Byeogsog-ui yeoja		
	The Good Father-in-law		Hal-abeojineun meosjaeng-i		
	Six Terminators		Yug-in-ui nanpogja		
	The Destiny of Some Woman		Yeo-in-ui jongchag-yeog		
	When We Share Pain Together		Neo-wa naega apeum-eul gat-i haess-eul ttae		
	Bakdal Ridge of Tears		Nunmul-ui Bagdaljae		
	The 25th Hour in the Underworld		Amheugga-ui 25si		
	Sad Palace Court		Bijeon		
	First Experience		Cheosgyeongheom		
	The 7th Man		Je7ui Sanai		
	A Woman in the Wall		Byeoksok-ui Yeoja		
	Rock of Crown Prince		Taejabawi		
	Life		Saengmyeong		
	Destiny of My Load		Jeonha Eodiro Gasinaikka		
	Castle of Rose		Jangmi-ui Seong		
	O-Gong-Nyeo Legend		O Gongnyeo-ui Han		
	Confess of Woman		Yeojaga Gobaeghal Ttae		
	Women Placed Above Men		Yeoseong Sang-wi Sidae		
	Opium Flower		Apyeonkkot		
	A Barren Woman		Seongnyeo		
	New Bride		Sae Saeksi		
	Nagyo Bridge		Nagyo		
	Condemned Criminals		O-in-ui Sahyeongsu		
	Immortal Rivers and Mountains		Mangogangsan		
	Lost Love		Eoneu Haneul Araeseo		
	Daughter-in-law of Blue Eyes		Paran Nunui Myeoneuri		
	Women of Yi-Dynasty		Ijo Yeoin Janhogsa		
	Mabeopseon		The Magical Ship		
	Day Dream		Janghanmong		
	Love is the Seed of Tears		Sarang-eun Nunmul-ui Ssi-at		
	A Single Woman		Doksinnyeo		
	Endless Love		Amuri Saranghaedo		
	Assassin		Amsalja		
	An Old Potter		Dok Jinneun Neulgeuni		
	Six Shadows		Yeoseotgae-ui Geurimja		
	Enmity And Affection		Miumboda Jeong-eul		
	Over the Hill		Jeo Eondeok-eul Neumeoseo		
	A Devil's Invitation		Akma-ui Chodae		
	Madame Anemone		Anemone Madam		
	Beautiful Land		Geumsu Gangsan		
	Trial		Simpan		
	Sweetheart		Jeongdeun nim		
	Arirang		Airang		
	Without Despair		Jeolmang-eun Eopda		
	A Solar Eclipse		Ilsik		
	A Journey		Yeoro		
	A Midnight Cry		Simya-ui Bimyeong		
	Enraged Land		Seongnan Daeji		
	Scared of Night		Bameun Museoweo		
	Eunuch		Naesi		
	Ghost Story		Goedam		
	Secret of Affection		Mojeongui Bimil		
	The Adventure of Great Ttolttori		Dae Ttolttoriui Moheom		
	I'm Not a Traitor		Naega Banyeogjanya		
	Until the Day Come Around		Geunari Olttaekkaji		
	A Cliff		Jeolbyeok		
	Great Swordsman		Daegeomgaek		
	Dark Flower		Heukhwa		
	The Life of a Woman		Yeoja-ui Ilsaeng		
	Sam-hyeon-yuk-gak		Sam-hyeon-yuk-gak		
	The King of a Rock Cave		Amgul Wang		
	From Earth to Eternity		Jisang-eseo Yeong-euro		
	The Body's Destination		Yugcheui Gil, The Way of All Flesh		
	A Regret		Han		
	[The White Crow		Hayan Kkamagwi		
	A Swordsman		Pung-unui Geomgaek		
	History of the Three States		Pung-un Samgukji		
	A Gisaeng Daughter-in-law		Eoneu Gisaeng Myeoneuri		
	A Grief		Aesu		
	A Secret Talk		Mireo		
	Full Ship		Manseon		
	Two Wayfarers		Du Nageune		
	Dolmuji		Dolmusi		
	Go Straight to South-southwest		Namnamseoro Jikhaenghara		
	I Am Not Lonely		Oeropji Anta		
	Horror of Triangle		Samgagui Gongpo		
	Street N. 66		66beongaui Hyeolyeon		
	Arrangements for the Search of an Identified Criminal		Jimyeongsubae		
	A Swordsman in the Twilight		Hwanghonui Geomgaek		
	Light and Shadow		Bitgwa Geurimja		
	Big Monster Wangmagwi		Ujugoein Wangmagwi		
	Loving the Years of War				
	Elder Brother's Wife		Hyeongsu		
	Tyrant		Daepokgun		
	Seok's Mother		Hanmanheun Seok-i Eomma		
	Special Agent X-7				
	Lady Teacher		Gasinae Seonsaeng		
	The Sword of Iljimae		Iljimae Pilsaui Geom		
	What Misunderstanding Left Behind		Ohaega Namgin Geot		
	A Grand Escape		Daetalchul		
	The Last Empress		Majimak Hwanghu Yunbi		
	An Invulnerable		Mujeokja		
	The Final Frontline		Choehujeonseon Baekpalsimni		
	A Night of Yeongdeungpo		Yeongdeungpoui Bam		
	Mother		Chinjeong Eomeoni		
	A Journey		Yeojeong		
	International Gold Robbery		Gukje Geumgoe sageon		
	8240 K.L.O		8240 K.L.O		
	Bitter Daedong River		Hanmaneun Daedonggang		
	Obokmun		Obokmun		
	A Killer's Note		Salin Sucheop		
	I Have Something to Say		Nado Hal Mari Idda		
	Spy Operation		Gancheop Jakjeon		
	Lady Suk		Sukbuin		
	The Night Street of the Vagabond		Nageune Bamgeori		
	Missing You to Death		Jukdorok Bogo Sip-eo		
	The International Spy		Gukje Gancheop		
	The Martyrs		Sungyoja		
	Woman Is Better		Yeojaga Deo Joh-a		
	Dad, Please Return Home		Appa Dorawayo		
	A Bloodthirsty Killer		Sal-inma		
	Sunset in the River Sarbin				
	The Night Makes No Response		Bam-eun Mal-i Eopda		
	The Elegy of the Mother and Daughter		Monyeo Bigok		
	The Elegy		Manga		
	I Can Also Love		Nado Yeon-aehal Su Itda		
	The Girl at the Ferry Point		Naruteo Cheonyeo		
	The Door of the Body		Yukche-ui Mun		
	The Messengers to Hamheung		Hamheungchasa		
	Airborne Troops		Teukjeondae		
	Two Sons-in-law		Keun Sawi Jageun Sawi		
	The Sino-Japanese War and Queen Min the Heroine		Cheong-iljeonjaenggwa yeogeol Minbi		
	The Song of Cheongsan		cheongsanbyeolgok		
	The Third Doom		Jesam-ui Unmyeong		
	Behold this Woman		I yeojareul Bora		
	The Great Sokgulam Cave Temple		Dae Seoggul-am		
	A Certain Love Affair		Eotteon Jeongsa		
	Hwang, Man of Wealth at Mapo		Mapo Saneun Hwangbuja		
	A Female Spy, Elisa		Yeogancheop Elisa		
	The North and South		Namgwa Buk		
	The DMZ		Bimujang Jidae		
	The Desperate Chase		Pilsa-ui Chujeok		
	The Blues with the Black Scar		Geomeun Sangcheo-ui Bureuseu		
	When Night Falls at Myeongdong		Myeongdong-e Bam-i Omyeon		
	Princess Dalgi		Dalgi		
	Red Scarf		Ppalgan Mahura		
	My Darling Has Passed Away, but His Song Still Remains		Nim-eun Gasigo Noraeman Nameo		
	A Daughter-in-law's Secret		Myeoneuri-ui Bimil		
	Rice		Ssal		
1962	Revenge		Wonhanui Irwoldo		
	Tyrant Yeonsan		Pokgun Yeonsan		
	Swordsman and Love		Geompung-yeonpung		
	A Sad Cry		Bulleodo Daedab-eomneun Ireumi-yeo		
	Family Meeting		Gajog Hoe-ui		
	The Best Bride and a Plain Young Man		Teukdeungsinbu-wa Samdeung Sillang		
	Prince Yeonsan		Yeonsan-gun		
	Princess Ok-ryeon and Hwalbindang		Okryeongongju-wa hwalbindang		
	As You Please		Jemeosdaelo		
	Till Death		I saengmyeong dahadorok		
	A Romantic Papa		Lomaenseu ppappa		
	A Love History/ History of Love		Sarang-ui yeogsa		
	Rainy Day 3 p.m.		Bioneun Narui Ohu Sesi		
	If You Overcome the Crisis		Gogaereul Neomeumyeon		
	Chun-Hui		Chunhui		
	Independence Association and young Lee Seung-Man		Dongniphyeophoewa Cheongnyeon Lee Seung-man		
	Sisters' Garden		Jamaeui Hwawon		
	When the Night Comes Again		Geu bam-i dasi-omyeon		

== Awards ==
- 1970, the 6th Baeksang Arts Awards: Favorite Film Actor selected by readers
- 1970, the 7th Blue Dragon Film Awards: Favorite Actor
- 1971, the 7th Baeksang Arts Awards: Favorite Film Actor selected by readers
- 1971, the 8th Blue Dragon Film Awards: Favorite Actor
- 1972, the 8th Baeksang Arts Awards: Favorite Film Actor selected by readers
- 1973, the 12th Grand Bell Awards: Best Actor (다정다한)
- 1973, the 9th Baeksang Arts Awards: Best Film Actor (충녀)
- 1973, the 9th Baeksang Arts Awards: Favorite Film Actor selected by readers
- 1974, the 10th Baeksang Arts Awards: Favorite Film Actor selected by readers
- 1975, the 11th Baeksang Arts Awards: Favorite Film Actor selected by readers
- 1981, the 20th Grand Bell Awards: Best Actor (피막)
