= Blue Dragon Film Award for Best Supporting Actor =

Blue Dragon South Korean Film Award

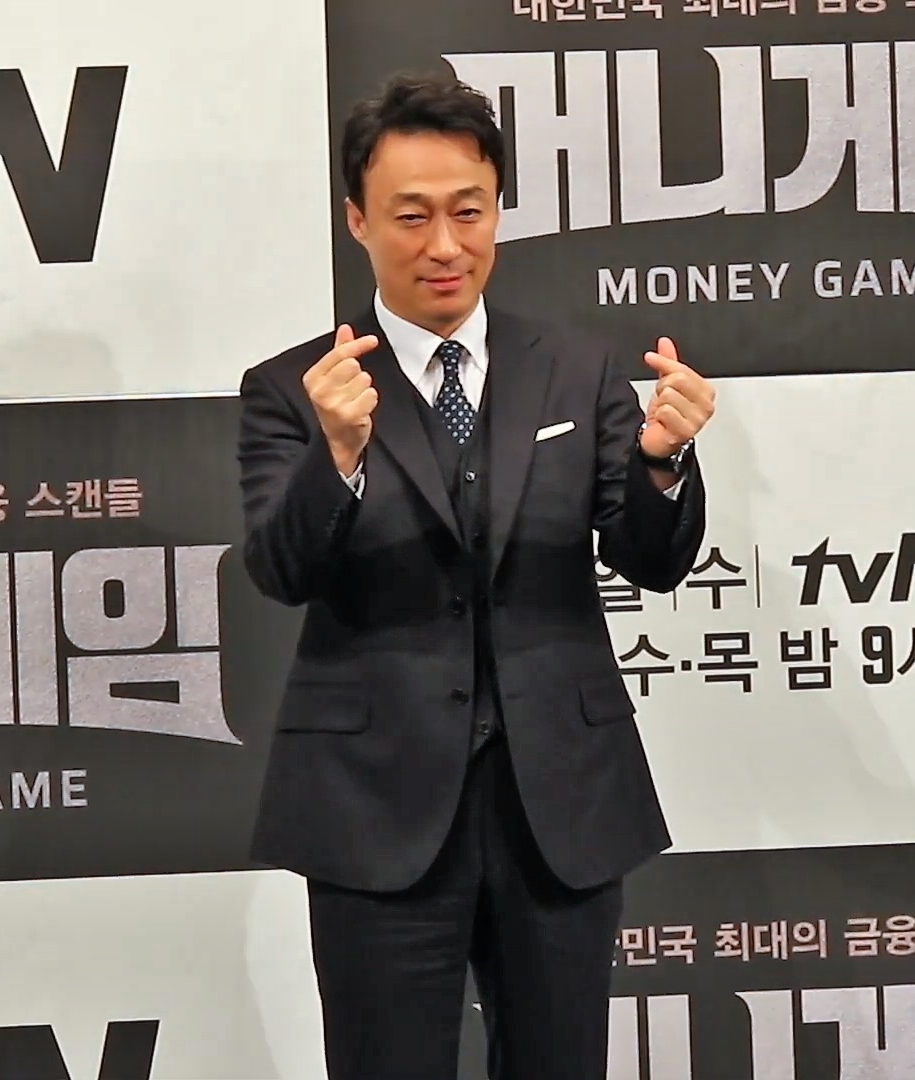
- The 2025 recipient: Lee Sung-min
- Awarded for: Best Supporting Actor
- Country: South Korea
- Presented by: Blue Dragon Film Awards
- First award: 1963
- Winner: Lee Sung-min
- Website: www.blueaward.co.kr

The Blue Dragon Film Award for Best Supporting Actor is one of the awards that is presented annually at the Blue Dragon Film Awards by Sports Chosun, which is typically held at the end of the year.

== Winners ==
=== 1960s ===
#	Year	Actor	Film
1	1963	Choi Nam-hyeon	Bloodline
2	1964	Choi Moo-ryong	Red Scarf
3	1965	Park No-sik	Courage is Alive (용사는 살아있다)
4	1966	Heo Jang-kang	A Hero Without a Serial Number (군번 없는 용사)
5	1967	Kim Hee-gap	Mountain (산)
6	1969	Park No-sik	Descendants of Cain

=== 1970s ===
#	Year	Actor	Film
7	1970	Heo Jang-kang	Spring, Spring (봄 봄)
8	1971	Hwang Hae	Pier Three at Sunset
9	1972	Yun Il-bong	Oyster Village
10	1973	Jang Hyuk	Long Live the Island Frogs

=== 1990s ===
#	Year	Actor	Film
11	1990	Choi Min-soo	North Korean Partisans in South Korea
12	1991	Lee Geung-young	Death Song
13	1992	Dokgo Young-jae	White Badge
14	1993	Ahn Byeong-kyeong	Sopyonje
15	1994	Kim Kap-soo	The Taebaek Mountains
16	1995	Huh Joon-ho	Terrorist
17	1996	Kim Hak-cheol	Born to Kill
18	1997	Song Kang-ho	No. 3
19	1998	Jung Jin-young	A Promise
20	1999	Jang Dong-gun	Nowhere to Hide

=== 2000s ===
#	Year	Actor	Film
21	2000	Shin Ha-kyun	Joint Security Area
22	2001	Ahn Sung-ki	Musa: The Warrior
23	2002	Yoo Dong-geun	Marrying the Mafia
24	2003	Baek Yoon-sik	Save the Green Planet!
25	2004	Jung Jae-young	Silmido
26	2005	Im Ha-ryong	Welcome to Dongmakgol
27	2006	Byun Hee-bong	The Host
28	2007	Kim Sang-ho	The Happy Life
29	2008	Park Hee-soon	Seven Days
30	2009	Jin Goo	Mother

=== 2010s ===
#	Year	Actor	Film
31	2010	Yoo Hae-jin	Moss
32	2011	Ryu Seung-ryong	War of the Arrows
33	2012	Ryu Seung-ryong	All About My Wife
34	2013	Lee Jung-jae	The Face Reader
35	2014	Cho Jin-woong	A Hard Day
36	2015	Oh Dal-su	Ode to My Father
37	2016	Jun Kunimura	The Wailing
38	2017	Jin Seon-kyu	The Outlaws
39	2018	Kim Joo-hyuk	Believer
40	2019	Jo Woo Jin	Default

=== 2020s ===
#	Year	Actor	Film
41	2020	Park Jeong-min	Deliver Us from Evil
42	2021	Huh Joon-ho	Escape from Mogadishu
43	2022	Byun Yo-han	Hansan: Rising Dragon
44	2023	Zo In-sung	Smugglers
45	2024	Jung Hae-in	I, the Executioner
46	2025	Lee Sung-min	No Other Choice

== General references ==
- "Winners and nominees lists". Blue Dragon Film Awards (in Korean). Archived from the original on 27 January 2022.
- "Blue Dragon Film Awards". Naver (in Korean).
