= Heo Jang-kang =

South Korean actor

- Heo in 1961
- Born: May 9, 1925; Seoul, South Korea
- Died: 21 September 1975 (aged 50); Seoul, South Korea
- Occupation: Actor
- Years active: 1969–1975
- Children: Heo Gi-ho; Huh Joon-ho

Korean name
- Hangul: 허장강
- Hanja: 許長姜
- RR: Heo Janggang
- MR: Hŏ Changgang

Heo Jang-gang (May 9, 1925 – September 21, 1975) was a South Korean actor, one of the representative actors in the 1960s and 1970s. He mainly took supporting roles such as villains or comical characters. He died of a heart attack after playing football in 1975.

His sons Heo Gi-ho and Huh Joon-ho also became actors.

== Filmography ==
*Note; the whole list is referenced.

Year	Title	Role
1975	Escape	
1975	Kim Du-Han III	
1975	Story of the Youth	
1975	Why Did I Do That?	
1975	Cattle	
1975	Red Shoes	
1975	Graduating School Girls	
1975	Pebbles	
1975	A Viper	
1975	A Man Causing a Typhoon	
1975	A Spy Remaining Behind	
1975	I Love Mama	Kang Moon-gil
1975	The Executioner	
1974	The North Korean Communists Party in Japan	
1974	Trouble of Morbid Suspicion About Wife's Chastity	
1974	A Life	
1974	A Girl Whose Name Is Unknown	
1974	A Flowery Bier	
1974	Where There Is Love?	
1974	The Witness in the Dark	
1974	Under the Sky of Sakhalin	
1974	It Is You	
1974	College Girl Maidservant	
1974	Snowy Night	
1974	I'm Gonna Marry	
1974	First Love at Myeong Dong	
1974	An Exorcist	
1974	The Land	
1974	A Childhood	
1974	Order of Assassination	
1974	Three Bothers	
1974	Arirang	
1974	Mr. Bull	
1974	An Inmate	
1974	The Wildflowers in the Battlefield	
1973	A Match	
1973	25 O'clock of Youth	
1973	False Charge	
1973	A Toast	
1973	The Principal Visits Seoul	
1973	An Age of Maiden	
1973	The Young Ones	
1973	The Great Glory	
1973	College Days	
1973	Julia and Tokukawa Ieyasu	
1973	Mammy's Wedding	
1973	Baettaragi	
1973	The 10 Court Ladies	
1972	A Wonderful Life	
1972	Friendship	
1972	A Lady Born in the Year of Rat	
1972	The Great Hell	
1972	The Way For Man	
1972	A Tiger of In Wang Mountain	
1972	Janghwa Hongryeon Jeon	
1972	The Midnight Sun	
1972	Young Teacher	
1972	Our Land of Korea	
1972	A Shaman's Story	
1972	Oh, Frailty	
1972	A Woman Called 'Daddy'	
1972	One to One	
1972	The Fugitive in The Storm	
1972	Kneel Down and Pray	
1972	A Cattle Seller	
1972	Nationwide Graduates	
1972	Cruel History of Myeong Dong	
1972	Don't Cry, My Daughter	
1972	Ever Smiling, Mr. Park	
1972	Looking for Sons and Daughters	
1972	Zip up	
1972	Men and Women	
1971	A Family Tree	
1971	Gap-dol and Gap-sun	
1971	Beautiful Korea	
1971	A Love Story	
1971	My Sister's Regrets	
1971	Tragic Death of Ambition	
1971	Bun-rye's Story	
1971	A Wayfarer	
1971	Break Up The Chain	Heo Dal-geon
1971	Twelve Guys in Myeongdong	
1971	No Offense	
1971	Quit Your life	
1971	The Royal Emissary With No ID	
1971	Three Black Leopards	
1971	Madame Impetuous	
1971	Tomorrow's Scenery of Korea	
1971	Let's Borrow Love	
1971	Brother and Sister in the Rain	
1971	Big Brother, Yong-Chil	
1971	The Man Who Was Crushed To Death By Money	
1971	I Risked My Life	
1971	Bravo, Korea	
1971	A Woman Fighter	
1971	Five Fighters	
1970	Little Swordsman	
1970	Great King Sejo	
1970	Five Brothers	
1970	Sad Palace Court	
1970	Little Wife	
1970	Man of Desires	
1970	Myeongdong Fella, Nampodong Fella	
1970	Merry Wedding	
1970	Angel, Put Your Clothes On	
1970	Haunted Bedroom	
1970	A Girl Born in the Year of Tiger	
1970	The Naked Sun	
1970	The Little Bridegroom's Return	
1970	The Woman Who Wanted an Apartment	
1970	The Harbor Man Returns	
1970	Sunday Night and Monday Morning	
1970	Odd Bride	
1970	Miss Chicken	
1970	Six Terminators	
1970	Seoul Is Not That Nice	
1970	Escape	
1970	Men of the Reserve Troops	
1970	Back Alley No. 5	
1970	Revenge of a Mother	
1970	A Man Who Arrived by Night Train	
1970	Little Bridegroom	
1970	Man and Woman from Hong Kong	
1970	Dangerous Liaison	
1970	Wang-geon, the Great	
1970	Return of the Condemned	
1970	Harbin at Sunset	
1970	Heartless on Harbor	
1970	If There Were No Parting Again	
1970	The Invincible of the Far East	
1970	A Wanderer in Shanghai	
1970	One-eyed Jack in Hong Kong	
1970	Goodbye, Tokyo	
1970	Escape in the Mist	
1970	A Wild Girl	
1970	The Confession of a Girl	
1970	The Story of Warriors	
1970	The Sun Never Gets Old	
1970	Thy Name Is Woman	
1970	Five Left-handers	
1970	Born in Nampo-dong	
1970	Secret Woman	
1970	Old Gentleman in Myeongdong	
1970	Quick as Lightning	
1970	Miss Hillbilly	
1970	Why Should Only Women Cry?	
1970	The Wedding Banquet	
1969	Forgotten Woman	
1969	The 7th Man	
1969	The World of Men	
1969	A Glorious Operation	
1969	Six Shadows	
1969	Girls	
1969	Duel of Midnight	
1969	A Blues of a Man	
1969	A Nicknamed Woman	
1969	Can't Forget	
1969	Singing Fair	
1969	Nagyo Bridge	
1969	The Main Room	
1969	A Returned Singer	
1969	Life	
1969	Eight Gallant Men	
1969	Chaser	
1969	Destiny of My Load	
1969	Singer and Daughter	
1969	Jang Nok-Su	
1969	One Step in the Hell	
1969	Installment Secretary	
1969	Spring, Spring	
1969	Deadly Sword	
1969	Blues at Midnight	
1969	A Man And a Gisaeng	Boss Heo
1969	Twin Dragon Sword	
1969	March of a Wife	
1969	7 People in the Cellar	Father An
1969	The Old Jar Craftsman	
1969	Immortal Rivers and Mountains	
1969	A Train to Beijing	
1969	Maternal Affection	
1969	Starting Point	
1969	Sahwasan Mountain	
1969	Condemned Criminals	
1969	Evil Person	
1969	Kkotnae	
1969	Snowy Night	
1969	Barber of Jangmaru Village	
1969	The Station Police	
1969	Daughter-in-law of Blue Eyes	
1969	Vice President	
1969	Invisible Man	
1969	Mrs. Wonnim	
1969	A Heartless Swordsman	
1969	Bring Back the Night Once More	
1969	Regret	
1969	Mabeopseon	
1969	You've Made a Mistake	
1969	Left-handed Man in Tokyo	
1969	Going Well	
1969	The Fan of Witchcraft	
1969	Emphasizing	
1969	Rock of Crown Prince	
1968	Bun-nyeo	
1968	Cruel Port	
1968	Chunhyang	
1968	Blue Light, Red Light	
1968	Returned Left-handed Man	
1968	Lonely Marriage Night	
1968	Great Swordsman	
1968	Bell Daegam	
1968	Students of Karl Marx	
1968	The Life of a Woman	
1968	Fight in Gongsan	
1968	Remorse	
1968	The King of a Rock Cave	
1968	Gentleman in His Only Suit	
1968	Secret Mission of Seven People	
1968	Arirang	
1968	Prince Daewon	
1968	Potato	
1968	White Bear	
1968	A Man of Windstorm	
1968	Childish Son-in-law	
1968	Death Can't Fall Us Apart	
1968	Mistress Manong	
1968	A Solar Eclipse	
1968	A Bride on the Second Floor	Lord Heo
1968	Femme Fatale, Jang Hee-bin	Jo Sa-seok
1968	The Sword of a Shooting Star	
1968	Jade Pin	
1968	Grandfather's Bokdeokbang	
1968	The Eternal Motherhood	
1968	Yeong	
1968	The Land of Korea	
1968	Wrong Target	
1968	A Man Like the Wind	
1968	Little Lady	
1968	The Arms and the Body	
1968	Eunuch	
1968	Day and Night	
1968	Nam	
1968	Hometown	
1968	A Gaze	
1968	Prince Yang-nyeong	
1968	Crossed Love	
1968	Mother Gisaeng	
1968	Mother is Strong	
1968	Revenge	
1968	Crossing the Teary Hill of Bakdaljae	
1968	A Pastoral Song	
1968	The Adventure of Great Ttolttori	
1968	I'm Not a Traitor	
1968	Rang	
1968	Romance Mama	
1968	Realtors	
1967	Myeongdong Hussy	
1967	A Public Cemetery of Wol-ha	
1967	Female Power	
1967	A Swordsman in the Twilight	
1967	Five Minutes before Curfew	
1967	A Cold Heartedness	
1967	Heat and Cold	
1967	Dongsimcho	
1967	Dolmuji	
1967	Tomorrow, I Will Smile	
1967	Longing in Every Heart	
1967	Nine Defecting Soldiers	
1967	Children in the Firing Range	Kim Sang-hyeon
1967	Six Daughters	
1967	The Three Hen-pecked Generations	
1967	The Queen Moonjeong	
1967	When Bucketwheet Flowers Blossom	
1967	Gang Myeong-hwa	
1967	A Swordsman	Choi Gwal
1967	Chun-Hui	
1967	A Female Student and an Old Gentleman	
1967	Confession of an Actress	Boss Heo
1967	Destiny	
1967	An Angry Calf	
1967	Seoul is Full	
1967	Harimao in Bangkok	
1967	Mubeonji	
1967	Nostalgia	
1967	Full Ship	Sung Sam
1967	Street N. 66	
1967	The Body's Destination	
1967	Swindler Mr. Heo	
1967	Yearning	
1966	A Water Mill	
1966	My Days Set in the Twilight	
1966	Operation Tiger	
1966	Wrongfully Accused	
1966	Yeraehyang	Mr. Heo
1966	The Sun Rises Again	
1966	A Story of a Nobleman	
1966	A Salt Peddler	
1966	River of Farewell	
1966	Mountain Gyeryong	
1966	No. 1, Mujeong Street	
1966	Horse-year Bride	
1966	Flower Palanquin	
1966	A Hero without Serial Number	
1966	Salsali, You Didn't Know	
1966	Night Blues	
1966	Dangerous Youth	
1966	I am a Free Man	
1966	Hun's	
1966	Crisis 113	
1966	Love Detective	
1965	Market	
1965	The Young Girls	
1965	The Same Starlight on this Land	
1965	A Life Wailing in Sorrow	
1965	The King and the Servant Boy	
1965	Hot Wind	
1965	Only a Woman Should Cry?	
1965	Woman is Better	
1965	A Legend of Urchins	
1965	Lion in the Dark World	
1965	A Rooster Man	
1965	Heilong River	
1965	The Cash is Mine	
1965	The Messengers to Hamheung	
1965	Airborne Troops	
1965	Lee Seong-gye King Taejo	
1965	The Violence Zone	
1965	The Married Daughter	
1965	The Sino-Japanese War and Queen Min the Heroine	Japanese Romantic
1965	Cheonggyecheon Stream	
1965	Every Dog Has His Day	
1965	The Third Doom	
1965	The Castle of Chastity	
1965	Incheon Landing Operations	
1965	Behold this Woman	
1965	Lee Su-il and Shim Sun-ae	
1965	The Story of Bae Local Official	Commander Lee Bang
1965	Three Villains in the River Songhwa	
1965	The Virgin Playing Saxophone	
1965	Good and Evil	
1965	Even Mountains and Streams Cried, Too	
1965	You've Got to Live	Hyeon Gam
1965	Haircutting Motherly Love	
1965	Love is Terrible	
1965	Fading in the Rain	
1965	The Sunflower Blooming at Night	
1965	The Idiot	
1965	The Elegy of the Mother and Daughter	
1965	The Wild Chrysanthemum	
1965	The Wild Tiger	
1965	The Foster Mother & the Natural Mother	
1965	The Widow's Daughter	
1965	The Woman with a Past	
1965	The Seven Female POW's	
1965	The Myth-Making Marine	
1965	Hwang, Man of Wealth at Mapo	
1965	The Sworn Brothers	
1965	The Great Sokgulam Cave Temple	
1965	The Night of Sadness	
1965	The Sun is Rising Again	
1965	There is also a Sunburn in the Mouse Hole	
1965	Staking One's Life	
1964	The Bacheolor Pub	
1964	Only for You	
1964	The Regular Tardy Student	
1964	The Headwoman of Pal Tong and Pal Ban	
1964	General Nami	
1964	The Skirt Rock	
1964	The Younger Brother-in-law	
1964	The Modern Grandma	
1964	The Governor at Pyeongyang Province	
1964	The Power for Ten Years	
1964	Seaman Park	
1964	The Old Korean Folk song in Downtown	
1964	The Panmunjeom Truce Village	
1964	The Housemaid	
1964	The Night Fog	
1964	Is It Possible? No Way	
1964	The Beauty and the Robber	
1964	Myohyang's Elegy	
1964	The East of Mongolia	
1964	Let's Meet on Thursday	
1964	The Guitar for Mother and Her Daughter	
1964	The Woman of Myeongdong	
1964	The Port Sea Gulls Sing a Song	
1964	The Regular Customers	
1964	My Darling Has Passed Away, but His Song Still Remains	
1964	The Chaste Woman Arang	
1964	The Night When Raining over the Acacia	
1964	The Father at Sinchon & the daughter at Myeongdong	
1964	The Smile in Grief	
1964	Sejong the Great	
1964	The Distorted Youth	
1964	My Dear	
1964	The Meaning to Plant a Phoenix Tree Is	
1964	Princess Snow White	
1964	The Women Divers	
1964	Queen Jinseong	
1964	Let's Walk As Looking Up	
1964	The Lovebirds Boat	
1964	The Beauty Murder Case in Bath	
1964	The Yangtze River	
1964	The Flower at Ansi Province	
1963	Like the Stars	
1963	Sinmungo	
1963	An Aristocrat's Love Affair	
1963	Daughters of Pharmacist Kim	
1963	Dried Yellow Croaker Fish	
1963	Lover of the Earth	
1963	A Sad Story of Danjong	
1963	Even Dandelions Bloom in Spring	
1963	Love Making Company	
1963	A Stubborn Guy	
1963	Shanghai Riru	
1963	What a Happy My Sister!	
1963	China Town	
1963	The Housemaid's Confession	
1963	The Classroom of Youth	
1963	The Gentlemen Like Something New	
1963	The Virgin in the Pub	
1963	Samyeongdang	
1963	The Masked Prince	
1963	Rice	Geon Bae
1963	Miss Kim's Double Life	
1963	The Loneliest Man in Seoul	
1962	Queen Dowager Inmok	
1962	A Woman Who Came at Night	
1962	A Man from Tokyo	
1962	Farewell Tumen River	
1962	How to Marry a Millionaire	
1962	Teacher Waryong's Trip to Seoul	
1962	The Sun Does Not Shine on Me	
1962	King Dongmyeong	
1962	Even Though I Die	
1962	Leaving the Fatherland	
1962	Only for You	
1962	Mr. Gong	
1962	Times of Love and Hatred	
1962	The Best Bride and a Plain Young Man	
1962	The Seven Princesses	
1962	Qin Shu Huangdi and the Great Wall of China	
1962	Somewhere in This World	
1962	A Sad Cry	Dan Jang
1962	Swordsman and Love	
1962	The Story of Sim Cheong	
1962	War and Love	
1962	Memory of Red Roses	
1962	Tyrant Yeonsan	Prince Jae-an
1962	Yang Kuei-Fei, a Destructive Beauty	
1962	A Log Bridge	Jang Du-chil
1962	Fighting Lions	
1962	Freely Given	
1961	Baekbaek Religious Fact	
1961	Mother and a Guest	
1961	My Only Love	
1961	A Dream of Fortune	Charlie Hong
1961	A Gang of Robbers	
1961	An Idiot	
1961	Prince Yeonsan	Prince Jae-an
1961	Seong Chun-hyang	Bang Ja
1961	Evergreen Tree	
1961	A Bonanza	Park Dal-soo
1961	Lim Kkeok-jeong	
1961	Iljimae, the Chivalrous Robber	
1961	Under the Sky of Seoul	Park Joo-sa
1961	Miryang Arirang	Heo Dal-seok
1961	A Torrent	
1960	A Sinless Youth	
1960	A Birth Control	
1960	Over the Hill	
1960	A Deserted Angel	
1960	A Revival	
1960	Soil	Lee Geon-yeong
1960	Ryeoin	
1960	A Youth Garden	
1960	A Love History	Mr. Kim
1960	A Drifting Story	Choi Young-cheol
1960	The Returned Man	
1960	A Pearl Tower	Jang Hyeon-do
1960	A Song of a Rose	
1960	Female Power	
1959	Looking for a Sunny Place	
1959	Triplets	
1959	Freshman at a College of Life	
1959	Even the Clouds Are Drifting	
1959	Dr. Flyboy	
1959	Heungbu and Nolbu	
1959	A Blood Bamboo	
1959	Only Wives Should Cry?	
1959	A Wife	
1959	Before A Love Is Gone	
1959	Burden of Love	
1959	Spring Comes and Goes	
1959	A Real-estate Agent for Life	
1959	She Should Live	
1959	A Prisoner of Cell No. 72	
1959	Way of the Body	
1959	Life Blessing Room	
1958	The Bell Tower	Seok Seung
1958	Returned Lover	
1958	The Tears of Mokpo	
1958	An Empty Dream	
1958	A Beautiful, Wicked Woman	
1958	The Snow Falling Night	
1958	The Lullaby	
1958	Flowing Star	
1958	The Endless Tragedy	
1957	The Palace of Ambition	Soe Mang-chi
1957	The No-Deul Riverside	
1957	Love	
1957	Farewell Sorrow!	
1956	Fight Back	
1956	Beat Back	
1955	Piagol	Man-soo
1954	Arirang	

== Awards and nominations ==
- 1966 the 4th Blue Dragon Film Awards : Best Supporting Actor for A Hero without Serial Number (Gunbeon-eobsneun Yongsa)
- 1972 the 8th Baeksang Arts Awards : Best Actor for Bun-Rye's story (Bunlyegi)
- 1974 the 13th Grand Bell Awards : Best Supporting Actor for A flowery bier (Kkochsang-yeo)
- 1975 the 14th Grand Bell Awards : Special Achievement Award

== See also ==
- List of South Korean male actors
- Cinema of Korea
