= The Memorial Gate for Virtuous Women =

- Theatrical poster for The Memorial Gate for Virtuous Women (1962)
- Hangul: 열녀문
- Hanja: 烈女門
- RR: Yeollyeomun
- MR: Yŏllyŏmun
- Directed by: Shin Sang-ok
- Written by: Hwang Sun-won
- Produced by: Shin Sang-ok
- Starring: Choi Eun-hee; Shin Young-kyun
- Cinematography: Jeong Hae-jun
- Edited by: Kim Yeong-hie
- Music by: Jeong Yun-ju
- Distributed by: Shin Films
- Release date: December 13, 1962
- Running time: 99 minutes
- Country: South Korea
- Language: Korean
- Box office: $9,457

The Memorial Gate for Virtuous Women, also known as Bound by Chastity Rules, (Korean: 열녀문) is a 1962 South Korean film directed by Shin Sang-ok. It was chosen as Best Film at the Grand Bell Awards. It was also entered into the 13th Berlin International and Cannes Film Festivals.

== Plot ==
A melodrama based on a novel. A widow in an aristocratic family has an affair with a servant and bears him a son. The widow's in-laws drive the servant and his son away. As a man, the widow's son comes to visit her, but, bound by the custom that she must remain celibate after her husband's death, she cannot acknowledge him.

== Cast ==
- Choi Eun-hee
- Shin Young-kyun
- Kim Dong-won
- Han Eun-jin

== Bibliography ==
- "YOLLYOMOON". The Complete Index to World Film. Archived from the original on 2012-03-25.
- 열녀문. Cine21 (in Korean).

Preceded by Prince Yeonsan	Grand Bell Awards for Best Film; 1963	Succeeded by Bloodline
