= Market (1965 film) =

- Theatrical poster for Market (1965)
- Hangul: 시장
- Hanja: 市場
- RR: Sijang
- MR: Sijang
- Directed by: Lee Man-hee
- Written by: Lee Du-hyeong
- Produced by: Lee Jong-byeok
- Starring: Shin Young-kyun
- Cinematography: Lee Byeong-sam
- Edited by: Kim Hee-su
- Music by: Jeon Jong-kun
- Distributed by: Dong Yang Films Co., Ltd.
- Release date: December 16, 1965
- Running time: 90 minutes
- Country: South Korea
- Language: Korean

Market (Korean: 시장) is a 1965 South Korean drama film directed by Lee Man-hee. It was awarded Best Film at the Blue Dragon Film Awards.

== Plot ==
Bok-nyeo, a mentally handicapped woman, supports her lazy husband by selling apples at the public marketplace. When her husband abandons her for another woman, another man who sympathizes with Bok-nyeo, kills him.

== Cast ==
- Shin Young-kyun
- Moon Jung-suk
- Kim Seung-ho
- Heo Jang-kang

== Bibliography ==
=== English ===
- "SHIJANG". The Complete Index to World Film.
- Shijang (1965) at IMDb
- "The Market Place (Sijang) (1965)". Korean Movie Database (KMDb).

=== Korean ===
- 시장 (in Korean). Cine21.
- 시장 (1965) (in Korean). Korean Movie Database (KMDb).
