= Wang-geon, the Great =

- Hangul: 태조 왕건: 후삼국 난세천하
- Hanja: 太祖 王建: 後三國 亂世天下
- RR: Taejo Wang Geon: husamguk nanse cheonha
- MR: T'aejo Wang Kŏn: husamguk nanse ch'ŏnha
- Directed by: Choi In-hyeon
- Screenplay by: Lim Hee-jae; Yoo Il-soo
- Produced by: Woo Gi-dong
- Starring: Kim Myeong-jin; Shin Young-kyun; Kim Ji-mee
- Cinematography: Yoo Jae-hyeong
- Edited by: Jang Hyeon-soo
- Music by: Jeong Yoon-joo
- Production companies: Segi, Inc.
- Release date: 6 February 1970
- Running time: 119 minutes
- Country: South Korea
- Language: Korean

Wang-geon, the Great (Korean: 태조 왕건) is a 1970 South Korean film directed by Choi In-hyeon, depicting the life of Wang-geon who ruled the Goryeo Dynasty.

== Plot ==
The film is about the life of General Wang-geon and how he becomes king of the Goryeo Dynasty after he killed the last king, Silla - Gu-jin.

== Cast ==
- Kim Myeong-jin
- Shin Young-kyun
- Kim Ji-mee
- Park Am
- Heo Jang-kang
- Ahn In-sook
- Sa Mi-ja
- Kim So-eun
- Kim Dong-won
- Choi Seong-ho

== See also ==
- Taejo Wang Geon (TV series)
