= Prince Daewon =

- Theatrical poster for King Daewon (1968)
- Hangul: 대원군
- Hanja: 大院君
- RR: Daewongun
- MR: Taewŏn'gun
- Directed by: Shin Sang-ok
- Written by: Yu Ju-hyeon
- Produced by: Lee Su-kil
- Starring: Shin Young-kyun; Kim Ji-mee
- Cinematography: Choi Seung-woo
- Edited by: Oh Seong-hwan
- Music by: Jeong Yun-ju
- Distributed by: Anyang Films
- Release date: April 12, 1968
- Country: South Korea
- Language: Korean
- Box office: $6,817

Prince Daewon (Korean: 대원군) is a 1968 South Korean film directed by Shin Sang-ok. It was chosen as Best Film at the Grand Bell Awards.

== Plot ==
A historical drama depicting power struggles in the last days of the Joseon period.

== Cast ==
- Shin Young-kyun
- Kim Ji-mee
- Choi Nam-Hyun
- Heo Jang-kang
- Park Am
- Kim Dong-won
- Yoon In-Ja
- Song Mi-nam
- Kim Dong-hun
- Gang Mun

== Bibliography ==
- "Daewongun". The Complete Index to World Film. Archived from the original on 2012-03-25.
- 대원군. Cine21 (in Korean).

=== Contemporary reviews ===
- 1968-04-14. "「동시녹음 첫 실현 <대원군>」". Hankook Ilbo.

Preceded by Coming Back	Grand Bell Awards for Best Film; 1968	Succeeded by Patriotic Martyr An Jung-gun
