= A Day Off =

- Film poster
- Hangul: 휴일
- RR: Hyuil
- MR: Hyuil
- Directed by: Lee Man-hee
- Written by: Baek Gyeol
- Produced by: Hong Ui-seon
- Starring: Shin Seong-il; Ji Yun-seong
- Cinematography: Lee Seok-gi
- Edited by: Hyeon Dong-chun
- Music by: Jeon Jong-kun
- Production company: Dae Han Yeon Hap Films
- Release date: 2005
- Running time: 73 minutes
- Country: South Korea
- Language: Korean

A Day Off (Korean: 휴일) is a South Korean drama film directed by Lee Man-hee. Shot and completed in 1968 but not released due to censorship, it opened to the public in 2005, 37 years later, after the original print was rediscovered during the reorganization of the Korean Film Archive's warehouse. Regarded as one of the masterpieces of 1960s Korean film and its representative modernist film, A Day Off was selected near the top of the top 100 Korean films list in 2014.

== Plot ==
One winter Sunday, a penniless young man named Huh Wook (Shin Seong-il) sets off to meet his beloved Ji-yeon (Ji Yun-seong). Unable to start a family, Ji-yeon, who is pregnant, needs an abortion.

== Cast ==
- Shin Seong-il as Huh Wook
- Ji Yun-seong as Ji-yeon
