= Shin Young-kyun =

South Korean actor and film producer (born 1928)

- Born: November 6, 1928 (age 98); Heizan, Kōkai Province, Korea, Empire of Japan

Korean name
- Hangul: 신영균
- Hanja: 申榮均
- RR: Sin Yeonggyun
- MR: Sin Yŏnggyun

Shin Young-kyun (Korean: 신영균; born November 6, 1928) is a South Korean actor, film producer, and politician.

== Biography ==
Shin Young-kyun was born in Heizan, Kōkai Province, Korea, Empire of Japan (now Hwanghae Province, North Korea) in 1928. When he was 10 years old, Shin went to Seoul. While studying dentistry at Seoul National University, he participated in a drama club where he got to know Park Am, Gil Yok-yun, and Lee Nak-hoon, who later became actors. Singer and songwriter Ejae is his maternal-granddaughter.

== Filmography ==
*Note; the whole list is referenced.

| Year | English title | Korean title | Romanization | Role | Director |
|---|---|---|---|---|---|
| | Flowers and Birds | | Hwajo | | |
| | Towards The High Place | | Jeo nop-eun gos-eul hyangha-yeo | | |
| | Hot Wind In Arabia | | Alabi-a yeolpung | | |
| | Sad San Francisco | | Aesu-ui Saenpeulansiseuko | | |
| | Azaleas in My Home | | Gohyang-e jindallae | | |
| | Catherinde's Escape | | Kaeseolin-ui talchul | | |
| 1973 | The Three-Day Reign | | Sam-ilcheonha | | |
| | An Echo of an Angel | | Cheonsa-ui me-ali | | |
| | A Family With Many Daughters | | Ttalbujajib | | |
| | Weeds | | Jabcho | | |
| | Don't Forget Love Although We Say Goodbye | | He-eojyeodo salangman-eun | | |
| | My Beloved Sons and Daughters | | Salanghaneun adeulttal-a | | |
| | A Woman Called 'Daddy' | | Appala buleuneun yeo-in | | |
| | A Woman Teacher | | Yeoseonsaeng | | |
| | Tonight Forever | | Ibam-i-yeo yeong-wonhi | | |
| | Sea Walls | | Haebyeog | | |
| | A Failure | | Ingannagjesaeng | | |
| | A Crossroad | | Gilo | | |
| | [LLife is on The Lonely Road | | Insaeng-eun nageunegil | | |
| | A Court Lady | | Gungnyeo | | |
| | The Man in Red Scarf | | Ppalgan mahula-ui sana-i | | |
| | Not a Good Wife | | Cheobog | | |
| | My Wife | | Nae anae-yeo | | |
| | My Old Brother 2 | | Hyeong | | |
| | The Crying Vird in Cheongsan | | Cheongsan-e uneun sae-ya | | |
| | A Woman Who Left Home | | Jib-eul na-on yeoja | | |
| | Sad Neon Lights | | Mujeong-ui ne-onga | | |
| | Once More, for Love | | Mi-wodo dasihanbeon | | |
| | Tomorrow's Scenery of Korea | | Nae-il-ui paldogangsan | | |
| | Sergeant Kim's Return From Vietnam | | Wolnam-eseo dol-a-on Gimsangsa | | |
| | Big Shot Bridegroom | | Daegamsinlang | | |
| | Before Too Late | | Neujgi jeon-e | | |
| | Horror in the Underworld | | Amheugga-ui gongpo | | |
| 1971 | All for Love | | Mi-wodo jeongttaemun-e | | |
| | My Father | | Chinjeong-abeoji | | |
| | A Brother and Sister Threesome | | Se nammae | | |
| | An Inner Affair | | Naesil samonim | | |
| | A Woman Who Came in Straw Sandals | | jipsegi singo wassne | | |
| | Leaving in the Rain | | Bissog-e tteonal salam | | |
| | Spring, Summer, Fall, and Winter | | Bom yeoleum ga-eul geuligo gyeo-ul | | |
| | Please, Leave When I Sleep | | Jamdeulmyeon tteonaju-o | | |
| | I'm Your Daughter | | Jigeum-eun nam-ijiman | | |
| | | | 1970--> | | |
| | That is the Sky over Seoul | | Jeogeos-i Seo-ul-ui haneul-ida | | |
| | A Woman in the Wall II | | Byeogsog-ui yeoja | | |
| | A Girl on Myungdong Street | | Myeongdonggasinae | | |
| | | | 1970--> | | |
| | What's Parents? | | Tteona-yahal salam-eun | | |
| | Farewell My Love | | Mi-wodo dasihanbeon<3pyeon> | | |
| | Separation at the Station | | Ibyeol-ui sib-o-yeolcha | | |
| 1970 | Wang-geon, the Great | | Taejo Wang Geon | | |
| | A Queen of Misfortune | | Bi-un-ui wangbi | | |
| | The Destiny of Some Woman | | Yeo-in-ui jongchag-yeog | | |
| | We Wish You a Long life, Mom and Dad! | | Eomma-appa Olaesase-yo | | |
| | Mi-ae | | Cheongchunmujeong | | |
| | An Abandoned Woman | | Beolimbad-eun yeoja | | |
| | The House of Two Women | | Du yeo-in-ui jib | | |
| | Que Sera Sera | | Sesangmansa tteusdaelo | | |
| | An Idiot Judge | | Hopipansa | | |
| | With or Without Love | | Yujeongmujeong | | |
| | Two Wives | | Cheo-wa cheo | | |
| | The Confession of a Girl | | Eoneu sonyeo-ui gobag | | |
| | Pagoda of No Shadow | | Mu-yeongtab | | |
| | Turtle | | Geobug-i | | |
| | Twisted Fate of a Man | | Hanmanh-eun nam-a-ilsaeng | | |
| | Why Life is so Cruel to Women | | Wae yeojaman-i ul-eo-ya hana | | |
| | The Woman Who Said Goodbye in Tears | | Ulgogan yeo-in | | |
| | If He Were the Father | | Geu bun-i appalamyeon | | |
| | Is There Sadness in Heaven | | Jeo haneul-edo seulpeum-i | | |
| | Lonely Father | | Gileogi appa | | |
| | Big Brother's Marriage | | Gyeolhondaejagjeon | | |
| | Secret Woman | | Sumgyeonon yeoja | | |
| | Though There Was No Vow | | Yagsog-eun eobs-eossjiman | | |
| | Great King Sejo | | Sejodae-wang | | |
| | Sad No More | | Seulpeum-eul oemyeonhal ttae | | |
| | Love Passes | | Sarang-eun Gago Sewolman Nama | | |
| | Tears Behind the Back | | Nammolle Heullin Nunmul | | |
| | Black Evening Gowns | | Geomeun Yahoebok | | |
| | The Main Room | | Naesil | | |
| | Darling | | Dangsin | | |
| | A Story of Seoul | | Seoul Yahwa | | |
| | Spring, Spring | | Bom Bom | | |
| | For Your Sake | | Dangsin-ui Ddeut-i-ramyeon | | |
| | Temptation | | Yuhok | | |
| | Affection and Love | | Jeonggwa Ae | | |
| | Devotion | | Hanmogsum Dabachyeo | | |
| | Deer in the Snow Field | | Jeo Nunbat-e Saseumi | | |
| | Jang Nok-Su | | Yohwa Jang Nok-su | | |
| | | | 1969--> | | |
| | Bitter But Once Again | | Miwodo Dasi Hanbeon | | |
| | Enuch | | Naesi | | |
| | The Past | | Sewori Heulleogamyeon | | |
| | Saint and Witch | | Seongnyeo-wa Manyeo | | |
| | Hiding Tears | | Nunmul-eul Gamchugo | | |
| | Brother | | Hyeong | | |
| | Women of Yi-Dynasty | | Ijo Yeoin Janhogsa | | |
| | A Far Away Star | | Byeol-eun Meol-eodo | | |
| | The Foe | | Ibaeg-osibjo | | |
| | Yeojin Tribe | | Yeojinjog | | |
| | Can't Forget | | Mot-ijeo | | |
| | Private Kim | | Yug-gun Gimilbyeong | | |
| | Devoting the Youth | | Cheongchun-eul Dabachyeo | | |
| | A Lonely Wild Goose | | Ulgo Ganeun Oegireogi | | |
| | Young Women | | Jeolmeun Yeoindeul | | |
| | Thousand Years Old Fox | | Cheonnyeonho | | |
| | Calling Out Your Name | | Mongmae-eo Bulleobwado | | |
| | A Thing Called Love | | Salang Iran Geoseun | | |
| | Forgotten Woman | | Ichyeojin Yeoin | | |
| | Cruel Youth | | Janhokan Cheongchun | | |
| | Escape | | Talchul Sipchilsi | | |
| | Love | | Saranghaetneunde | | |
| 1968 | Prince Daewon | | Dae-wongun | | |
| | White Bear | | Hayan Gom | | |
| | Death Can't Fall Us Apart | | Jugeodo Monijeo | | |
| | The Land of Korea | | Paldo-gangsan | | |
| | Dreams of Sora | | Soraui Ggum | | |
| | A Man Like the Wind | | Baramgateun Sanai | | |
| | Day and Night | | Natgwa Bam | | |
| | Women's Quarter | | Gyubang | | |
| | Scandal | | Pamun | | |
| | A Wonderer | | Pungranggaek | | |
| | Prince Yang-nyeong | | Bangrangdaegun | | |
| | The Sister's Diary | | Eunni-eui Ilgi | | |
| | A Pastoral Song | | Mokga | | |
| | Glory of Barefoot | | Maenbarui Yeonggwang | | |
| | Lonely Marriage Night | | Doksugongbang | | |
| | Pure Love | | Sunjeong | | |
| | Female Bandits | | Yeo Majeok | | |
| | Rang | | Rang | | |
| | A Man of Great Strength: Im Ggyeok-jeong | | Cheonha Jangsa, Im Ggyeok-jeong | | |
| | Bell Daegam | | Bang-ul Daegam | | |
| | Students of Karl Marx | | Karl Marx-ui Jejadeul | | |
| | Love Me Once Again | | Miweodo Dasi Han Beon | | |
| | Purple Ribbon | | Jaju Daenggi | | |
| | Homeless | | Musukja | | |
| | Sword of a Chivalrous Robber | | Goedo-ui Geom | | |
| | Shining Sadness | | Chanranhan Seulpeum | | |
| | A Child of Winds and Clouds | | Pung-una | | |
| | Romance Mama | | Romaenseu Mama | | |
| | A Young Bride | | Cheolbuji Assi | | |
| | Herb of Longing | | Sangsacho | | |
| | The Gate of Filial Piety | | Hyojamun | | |
| | Five Minutes before Curfew | | Tonggeum Obunjeon | | |
| 1967 | Farewell | | Gobyeol | | |
| | Six Daughters | | The Land of Korea / Paldogangsan | | |
| | A Heavenly Peach Flower | | Cheondohwa | | |
| | The Hateful King | | Sanggammama Miwoyo | | |
| | Mrs. Seoul | | Seoul Ajumma | | |
| | Injo Restoration | | Injobanjeong | | |
| | The Queen Moonjeong | | Munjeong-wanghu | | |
| | Bobbed Hair | | Danbalmeori | | |
| | A Princess Daughter-in-law | | Gongju Myeoneuri | | |
| | Full Ship | | Manseon | | |
| | The Last Day of the Week | | Majimak Yoil | | |
| | Mounted Bandits | | Majeok | | |
| | Tearful Farewell | | Tteugeoun Annyeong | | |
| | Two Wayfarers | | Du Nageune | | |
| | Stationary Windmill | | Doljianneun Pungcha | | |
| | A Secret Royal Inspector | | Amhaeng-eosa | | |
| | Mountain | | San | | |
| | Dreams | | Ggum | | |
| | Seed Money | | Jongjadon | | |
| | History of the Three States | | Pung-un Samgukji | | |
| | A Virtuous Woman | | Chilbuyeollyeo | | |
| | A Red-and-blue Gauze Lantern | | Cheongsachorong | | |
| | A Meritorious Retainer | | Ildeunggongsin | | |
| | Lovers | | Aein | | |
| | A Bloody Fight of SuraMoon | | Suramunui Hyeoltu | | |
| | A Miracle of Gratitude | | Bo-eunui Gijeok | | |
| | Harimao in Bangkok | | Bangkok-ui Harimao | | |
| | 509 Tank Forces | | Jangryeol 509 Daejeonchadae | | |
| | Nostalgia | | Manghyang Cheolli | | |
| | An Emperor with Iron Mask | | Cheolmyeonhwangje | | |
| 1967 | Flame in the Valley | | Sanbul | | |
| | Survive for Me | | Nae Mokkkaji Saraju | | |
| | River of Love | | Aeha | | |
| | The Secretariat | | Biseosil | | |
| | Four Sisters | | Nejamae | | |
| | Heat and Cold | | Naenggwa Yeol | | |
| | Sunae | | Sunae | | |
| | Goodbye, Japan | | Jal Itgeora Ilbonttang | | |
| | River of Farewell | | Ibyeol-eui Gang | | |
| | A Rescue Order | | Talchul Myeongryeong | | |
| | Flower Palanquin | | Ggockgama | | |
| | A Hero without Serial Number | | Gunbeon-eobsneun Yongsa | | |
| | Fighters on a Wide Plain | | Gwan-gya-ui Gyeolsadae | | |
| | Secret Agency | | Bimil Cheobbodae | | |
| 1966 | A Soldier Speaks After Death | | Byeongsaneun Jugeoseo Malhanda | | |
| | Wild Flowers | | Sanyuhwa | | |
| | The Dead and the Alive | | Jugeun Jawa San Ja | | |
| | A Nameless Grass | | Mumyeongcho | | |
| | A Youth March | | Cheongchun Haengjingok | | |
| | Nightmare | | Angmong | | |
| | Pyeongyang Gisaeng | | Pyeongyang Gisaeng | | |
| | Red Line | | Jeokseonjidae | | |
| | Because I Am a Woman | | Yeojaigi Ttaemune | | |
| | A Water Mill | | Mullebanga | | |
| | When the Day Comes | | Eonjena Geunarimyeon | | |
| | Sunset in the River Sarbin | | | | |
| | Fading in the Rain | | Bissok-e Jida | | |
| | Jang Bo-go | | Jang Bogo | | |
| | The Youngest Daughter | | Mangnaettal | | |
| | The Man's Life | | Nam-a-ilsaeng | | |
| | The Wild Tiger | | Gwang-ya-ui Horang-i | | |
| | The Foster Mother & the Natural Mother | | | | |
| | The Young Girls | | Gasinai | | |
| 1965 | The Sea Village | | Gaenma-eul | | |
| | Don't Cry, Hong-do | | Hongdo-ya Ulji Mara | | |
| | The Marine Commando | | Haebyeong Teukgongdae | | |
| | Blood-soaked Mountain Guwol | | Pi-eorin Gu-wolsan | | |
| 1965 | Lee Seong-gye King Taejo | | Taejo Lee Seonggye | | |
| | Cheonggyecheon Stream | | Cheonggyecheon | | |
| | The Third Doom | | Jesam-ui Unmyeong | | |
| | The Castle of Chastity | | Jeongjoseong | | |
| | Incheon Landing Operations | | Incheonsangryukjakjeon | | |
| 1965 | Sad Story of Self Supporting Child | | Jeo Haneul-edo Seulpeum-i | | |
| | Courage is Alive | | Yongsaneun Sara Itda | | |
| | The King and the Servant Boy | | Wanggwa Sangno | | |
| | Speak, the Yalu River | | Aprokgang-a Malhara | | |
| | Farewell, Sorrow | | Seulpeumiyeo Jal Itgeora | | |
| | The Angry Eagle | | Seongnan Doksuri | | |
| | The Order to Kill | | Sal-in Myeongryeong | | |
| | You've Got to Live | | | | |
| | Unexpected Love | | Yegichi Mothan Sarang | | |
| | The Mountain Top Called Mother and Daughter | | Monyeobong | | |
| | The North and South | | Namgwa Buk | | |
| | 44 Myeongdong | | Myeongdong Sasipsa-beonji | | |
| | Living in His Wife's Home | | Cheogasari | | |
| | Lost Years | | Ireobeorin Sewol | | |
| 1965 | Market | | Sijang | | |
| | The Tiger Moth | | Bulnabi | | |
| | 55 Street Shanghai | | Sanghai Osip-obeonji | | |
| | The Power for Ten Years | | Simnyeon Sedo | | |
| | Queen Jinseong | | Jinseong-yeowang | | |
| 1964 | Extra Human Being | | Ing-yeo Ingan | | |
| | The Saja Castle | | Saja Seong | | |
| | The Meaning to Plant a Phoenix Tree Is | | Byeogodong Simeun Tteuseun | | |
| | The Guitar for Mother and Her Daughter | | Monyeo Gita | | |
| | The Korean Instrument with 12 Strings | | Ga-yageum | | |
| | What Is More Valuable than Life | | Moksumboda Deohan Geot | | |
| | Sakyamuni Buddha | | Seokgamoni | | |
| | The Opium War | | Apyeong Jeonjaeng | | |
| | The Bloody Fight in the Golden Field | | Hwanggeumbeolpan-ui Hyeoltu | | |
| 1965 | Red Scarf | | Ppalgan Mahura | | |
| | The Governor at Pyeongyang Province | | Pyeongyang Gamsa | | |
| | Princess Dalgi | | Dalgi | | |
| | The Brave Woman | | Yeojangbu | | |
| | Virginhood | | Cheonyeoseong | | |
| | My Brother and Sister-in-laws | | Hyeongbuwa Sae-eonni | | |
| | The Three-forked Crossing of Cheon-an | | Cheon-an Samgeori | | |
| | The Heartbreaking Story | | Danjanglok | | |
| | General Nami | | Nami Janggun | | |
| | I Have Been Cheated | | Naneun Sogatda | | |
| | The Pay Envelope | | Wolgeupbongtu | | |
| | Eagle Five | | O-in-ui Doksuri | | |
| 1963 | Rice | | Ssal | | |
| | A Reluctance Prince | | Ganghwadoryeong | | |
| | King Cheoljong and Bongnyeo | | Cheoljonghwa Bongnyeo | | |
| | Seong Chun-hyang from Hanyang | | Hanyang-eseo On Seong Chunhyang | | |
| | The Conqueror | | Jeongbokja | | |
| | The Torchlight | | Hwaetbul | | |
| 1963 | Blood Relation | | Hyeolmaek | | |
| | The Cloud Bridge of Gratitude | | Boeunui Gureumdari | | |
| | Ssangeommu | | Ssanggeommu | | |
| | Because They Love Until Death | | Jukdorok Saranghaeseo | | |
| | Love is to Give | | Sarang-eun Juneungeot | | |
| | Love Affair | | Romanseugrei | | |
| | I Have a Secret | | Naneun Bimiri Itda | | |
| 1962 | The Memorial Gate for Virtuous Women | | Yeollyeomun | | |
| | When Acacias Bloom | | Acacia Kkochi Ppil Ttae | | |
| | A Wife from a Mountain Village | | Sansaeksi | | |
| | Swordsman and Love | | Geompung-yeonpung | | |
| | 12 Fighters | | Sibi-inui Yado | | |
| | A New Recruit, Mr. Lee | | Sinibsawon Mr. Lee | | |
| | Memory of Red Roses | | Bulgeun Jangmi-ui Chu-eok | | |
| | Donghak Revolution | | Donghak Nan | | |
| | The Seven Princesses | | Chilgongju | | |
| | Qin Shu Huangdi and the Great Wall of China | | Jinsihwangje-wa Mallijangseong | | |
| | The War and an Old Man | | Jeonjaenggwa No-in | | |
| | Unforgettable Love | | Ijeul Su Eomneun Aejeong | | |
| | There Is No Bad Man | | Agineun Eopda | | |
| | Don't Break Damaged Reeds | | Sang-han Galdaereul Kkeokjimara | | |
| | I'll Never Fall in Love Again | | Sarang-eul Dasi Haji Aneuri | | |
| | Queen Dowager Inmok | | Inmok Daebi | | |
| | Bravo, Young Ones! | | Burabo Cheongchun | | |
| | People, Hurray! | | In-gan Manse | | |
| | Tyrant Yeonsan | | Pokgun Yeonsan | | |
| | Yang Kuei-Fei, a Destructive Beauty | | Cheonha-ilsaek Yang Gwibi | | |
| | King Dongmyeong | | Sarang-ui Dongmyeong-wang | | |
| | Man in Yellow Shirt | | Noran Syasseu-ibeun Sanai | | |
| | Life of a Woman | | Yeoja-ui Ilsaeng | | |
| | Times of Love and Hatred | | Sarang-gwa Mi-um-ui Sewol | | |
| | The Way of Hwarang | | Hwarangdo | | |
| | The Sun Does Not Shine on Me | | Tae-yang-eul Deungjin Saramdeul | | |
| | Tremendously Lucky Man | | Eoksege Jaesujo-eun Sanai | | |
| | Black Hood | | Heukdu-geon | | |
| | A Wanderer | | Juyucheonha | | |
| | Find a Secret Path | | Bimiltongnoreul Chajara | | |
| 1962 | Revenge | | Wonhanui Irwoldo | | |
| | Mother and a Guest | | Sarangbang Sonnimgwa Eomeoni | | |
| | Tragedy of Yun | | Dangjaengbihwa | | |
| | My Only Love | | Ilpyeondansim | | |
| 1961 | Prince Yeonsan | | Yeonsan-gun | | |
| | Evergreen Tree | | Sangnoksu | | |
| 1961 | Five Marines | | O in-ui haebyeong | | |
| | Chastity | | Jeongjo | | |
| | Lim Kkeok-jeong | | Lim Kkeok-jeong | | |
| | Iljimae the Chivalrous Robber | | Uijeok Iljimae | | |
| | Under the Sky of Seoul | | Seoul-ui Jibungmit | | |
| 1961 | The Coachman | | Mabu | | |
| | Ondal the Fool and Princess Pyeong-Gang | | Babo Ondal-gwa Pyeonggang Gongju | | |
| | Fishermen | | Eobudeul | | |
| | A Mistress | | Jeongbu | | |
| | A Widow | | Gwabu | | |
| | Ah! Baekbeom Kim Gu | | Ah! Baek Beom Kim Ku Seonsaeng | | |

=== Planner ===
| Year | English title | Korean title | Romanization | Role | Director |
|---|---|---|---|---|---|
| | That is the Sky over Seoul | | Jeogeos-i Seo-ul-ui haneul-ida | | |

=== Producer ===
| Year | English title | Korean title | Romanization | Role | Director |
|---|---|---|---|---|---|
| | That Last Winter | | Geu magimak gyeowul | | |
| | A Migrant Bird in a Nest | | Dungjisok-ui Cheolsae | | |

== Awards ==
- 1962 1st Grand Bell Awards: Best Actor for Prince Yeonsan
- 1963 2nd Grand Bell Awards: Best Actor for The Memorial Gate for Virtuous Women
- 1964 2nd Blue Dragon Film Awards: Favorite Actor
- 1965 4th Grand Bell Awards: Best Actor for Princess Dalgi
- 1965 3rd Blue Dragon Film Awards: Favorite Actor
- 1966 4th Blue Dragon Film Awards: Best Actor for The Market Place
- 1965 2nd Baeksang Arts Awards: Best Film Actor
- 1965 4th Blue Dragon Film Awards: Favorite Actor
- 1969 5th Baeksang Arts Awards: Favorite Film Actor for Prince Daewon
- 1970 6th Baeksang Arts Awards: Favorite Film Actor
- 1972 8th Baeksang Arts Awards: Favorite Film Actor
- 2007 44th Grand Bell Awards: Special Achievement Award
- 2008 7th Korean Film Awards: Special Achievement Award
- 2010 47th Grand Bell Awards: Special Award

== Election results ==
| Year | Elections | Constituency | Political party | Votes (%) | Results |
|---|---|---|---|---|---|
| 1988 | 13th National Assembly General Election | Seongdong C (Seoul) | DJP | 36,142 (30.87%) | Defeated (2nd) |
| 1996 | 15th National Assembly General Election | National (8th) | NKP | 6,783,730 (34.52%) | Elected |
| 2000 | 16th National Assembly General Election | Proportional (5th) | GNP | 7,365,359 (38.96%) | Elected |
