= Red Scarf (film) =

- Film poster
- Hangul: 빨간 마후라
- RR: Ppalgan mahura
- MR: Ppalgan mahura
- Directed by: Shin Sang-ok
- Screenplay by: Kim Kang-yoon
- Story by: Han Wun-sa
- Produced by: Shin Tae-seon
- Starring: Shin Young-kyun; Choi Eun-hee; Choi Moo-ryong
- Cinematography: Kim Jong-rae; Jeong Hae-jun (aerial sequences)
- Edited by: Yang Seong-ran
- Music by: Hwang Mun-pyeong
- Production company: Shin Films
- Release dates: March 27, 1964 (South Korea); October 7, 1964 (Taiwan); September 15, 1965 (Hong Kong); April 9, 1966 (Japan)
- Running time: 100 minutes
- Country: South Korea
- Language: Korean

Red Scarf (Korean: 빨간 마후라), also known as Red Muffler and Operation Air Raid-Red Muffler, is a 1964 South Korean aviation war film set during the Korean War. Headlined by stars Shin Young-kyun, Choi Eun-hee, Choi Moo-ryong some of the best known South Korean actors of their time, Red Scarf is among the most iconic of prolific director Shin Sang-ok's work, and was well received outside of South Korea. The film was made with the cooperation of the Republic of Korea Air Force (ROKAF) and is particularly well remembered for its aerial sequences, especially the final showdown between RoKAF F-86 Sabres and Korean People's Air Force MiG-15s. It inspired the 2012 action film R2B: Return to Base.

== Plot ==
In 1952, during the Korean War, many South Korean fighter pilots were killed. Of those that remain one of the most skilled is Major Na Gwan-jung. In the air he is calm and level headed, and dispatches the enemy with minimum complications. On the ground he spends his time drinking with his comrades; the vagaries of life and death in wartime have led to the pilots adopting a 'live for the moment' approach to life.

Ji-seon was married to a fallen pilot, widowed very soon after becoming married. Being unable to support herself the only option left to her is to become a bargirl. Na Gwan-jung saves her from this fate, helps provide for her, and falls in love with her. However, as she is the widow of a close comrade, Gwan-jung cannot bring himself to act on his love; instead he acts as matchmaker introducing her to Bae Dae-bong, a cocky hotshot pilot, who is newly transferred to his unit.

Na Gwan-jung's unit is tasked with the destruction of a vitally strategic bridge, during which Bae Dae-bong's plane is shot down. Not wanting Ji-seon to lose another loved one, Gwan-jung risks all to keep the downed pilot safe until he can be rescued. The South Korean pilots are victorious and complete their mission. However, with thoughts other than taking down the enemy fighter pilots spoiling his focus, Na Gwan-jung is unable to fly and fight in his usual cool, detached and dispassionate way and is killed in action.

The unit returns to base and Na Gwan-jung's will is read out. In accordance with it, his effects, including the red scarf which all the pilots wear, are divided amongst his comrades. Na Gwan-jung's mother arrives to visit her son with a delivery of beer, only to find that he has died in action. In keeping with her son's character she shares out the beers she brought for him amongst his comrades. Ji-seon soon also arrives, and on learning of Gwan-jung's death, clutches his red scarf and cries inconsolably.

== Cast ==
- Shin Young-kyun as Major Na Gwan-jung

South Korean ace fighter pilot

- Choi Eun-hee as Ji-seon

Young widow, wife of a comrade of Gwan-jung

- Choi Moo-ryong as Bae Dae-bong

South Korean fighter pilot, new hotshot assigned to unit

- Namkoong Won as No Do-seon

South Korean fighter pilot, late husband of Ji-seon

- Yun In-ja

== Awards ==
11th Asia-Pacific Film Festival (1964)
Best director - Shin Sang-ok
Best leading actor -Shin Young-kyun
Best film editing - Yang Seong-ran

2nd Blue Dragon Film Awards (1964)
Best supporting actor - Choi Moo-ryong
Best screenplay - Kim Kang-yoon
Best cinematography (color) - Kim Jong-rae
Award for technical excellence (editing) - Yang Seong-ran

4th Grand Bell Awards (1965)
Best supporting actress - Yun In-ja
Best cinematography - Kim Jong-rae

== Background ==
The film was made with the full support of the Republic of Korea Air Force and production costs were partly subsidised by the South Korean military government in line with its film policy of supporting anticommunist propaganda films.

South Korean pilots use F-86 Sabre. In reality, they were perceived by South Korea from 1955, after the end of the war.

The Red Scarf of the title is not the red neckerchief associated with the communist pioneer movement, but a scarf introduced as a device to aid visual location of downed South Korean airmen, it has since become and remains one of the symbols of the Republic of Korea Air Force.

== Reception ==
Red Scarf was particularly well received outside of South Korea and was the first South Korean film to receive a nationwide distribution in Japan. In Taiwan it proved popular from the school playground upwards, children played at and wanted to grow up to be aviators; the theme song could be heard in every back alley and the red scarf became a fashion item. The film has been described as a precursor of the Korean Wave in Taiwan.

In Taiwan and Chinese speaking areas it was known as 紅巾特攻隊, literally Red Scarf Special Operations Unit.

== Remake ==
In 2011 work began on a loose remake of the film as a last project for Korean entertainer Rain prior to the start of his mandatory military service. Red Scarf was used as a working title and in pre-production; the film was released in 2012 as R2B: Return to Base. In the remake the point of view character is the new hotshot pilot transferred to the unit. Like its predecessor Return to Base was made with the full support of the RoKAF, and like its predecessor its final message is that the RoKAF stands vigilant and ready to defend South Korea from the North.

== See also ==
- The Bridges at Toko-ri

== Notes ==
- This article is based on the Chinese language version of this article.
- This article uses where possible the established romanizations of cast and crew member's names, where these have been impossible to find (and for the character names), the names used are revised romanizations of the names given in the Chinese Wikipedia article read as Hanja.
