= Daughters of Pharmacist Kim =

1963 film by Yu Hyeon-mok

- Theatrical poster for Daughters of Pharmacist Kim (1963)
- Hangul: 김약국의 딸들
- Hanja: 金藥局의 딸들
- RR: Gimyakgugui ttaldeul
- MR: Kimyakkugŭi ttaldŭl
- Directed by: Yu Hyun-mok
- Written by: Yoo Han-cheol
- Produced by: Cha Tae-jin
- Starring: Choi Ji-hee; Um Aing-ran; Hwang Jung-seun
- Cinematography: Byeon In-jib
- Edited by: Yu Hyun-mok
- Music by: Kim Seong-tae
- Production company: Geukdong Film
- Release date: May 1, 1963
- Running time: 97 minutes
- Country: South Korea
- Language: Korean

Daughters of Pharmacist Kim (Korean: 김약국의 딸들) is a 1963 South Korean drama film by Yu Hyun-mok portraying sibling rivalry and the troubled marriages of four sisters. In 2005, the film was adapted as an MBC television series.

== Plot ==
The story of four daughters of a herb shopkeeper who faced tumultuous marriages with different lives.

== Cast ==
- Choi Ji-hee
- Um Aing-ran
- Hwang Jung-seun
- Kim Dong-won
- Gang Mi-ae
- Hwang Hae
- Park No-sik
- Heo Jang-kang
- Lee Min-ja
- Shin Seong-il
