= The Three-Day Reign =

- Theatrical poster for The Three-Day Reign (1973)
- Hangul: 삼일천하
- Hanja: 三日天下
- RR: Samilcheonha
- MR: Samilch'ŏnha
- Directed by: Shin Sang-ok
- Written by: Gwak Il-ro
- Produced by: Shin Sang-ok
- Starring: Shin Young-kyun
- Cinematography: Choi Seung-woo
- Edited by: Kim Hyeon
- Music by: Hwang Mun-pyeong
- Distributed by: An Yang Films Co., Ltd.
- Release date: February 15, 1973
- Running time: 132 minutes
- Country: South Korea
- Language: Korean
- Box office: $1,390

The Three-Day Reign (Korean: 삼일천하) also known as Three Days of Their Reign is a 1973 South Korean historical drama film directed by Shin Sang-ok. Actor Shin Young-kyun was named Best Actor for his performance in the film.

== Plot ==
During the last days of the Yi dynasty, conflict arises between the China-leaning conservatives, and the Western-learning and Japan-leaning reformers over how to rule Korea in the future. The reformer Kim Okkyun helps persuade the king to announce Korea's independence, breaking with China. When a conservative agent informs China, Chinese troops enter Korea and end the reign of independence after three days.

== Cast ==
- Shin Young-kyun
- Shin Seong-il
- Yoon Jeong-hee
- Park Nou-sik
- Namkoong Won
- Han Mun-jeong
- Sin Il-ryong
- Do Kum-bong
- Hwang Hae
- O Cheon-pyeong

== Bibliography ==
- 삼일천하. Cine21 (in Korean).
