= Prince Yeonsan (film) =

- Theatrical poster for Prince Yeonsan (1961)
- Hangul: 연산군
- Hanja: 燕山君
- RR: Yeonsangun
- MR: Yŏnsan'gun
- Directed by: Shin Sang-ok
- Written by: Lim Hee-jae
- Produced by: Shin Sang-ok
- Starring: Shin Young-kyun
- Cinematography: Bea Sung-hak; Jeong Hae-jun
- Edited by: Kim Young-hee; Yang Seong-ran
- Music by: Jeong Yoon-joo
- Distributed by: Shin Films
- Release date: 31 December 1961
- Running time: 133 minutes
- Country: South Korea
- Language: Korean
- Budget: ₩65,000,000
- Box office: $13,721

Prince Yeonsan (Korean: 연산군) is a 1961 South Korean film directed by Shin Sang-ok. Among several awards including Best Actor and Best Actress, it was chosen as Best Film at the first Grand Bell Awards ceremony. It was followed by a sequel, Tyrant Yeonsan, which was released in 1962.

== Plot ==
A historical drama about Yeonsangun of Joseon as a prince trying to restore the status of his mother, the deposed and executed Queen Yun.

== Cast ==
- Shin Young-kyun as Prince Yeonsan
- Shin Seong-il
- Choi Eun-hee as Deposed Queen Shin
- Kim Dong-won as Seongjong
- Ju Jeung-ryu: Yun Pyebi, the deposed queen
- Han Eun-jin as Mother of Yun
- Heo Jang-kang
- Kim Jin-kyu
- Do Kum-bong as Jang Nok-su
- Jeon Ok
- Choi Nam-hyeon
- Kim Hie-gab
- Lee Ye-chun
- Namkoong Won
- Hwang Jeong-su
- Lee Min-ja

== Contemporary reviews ==
- November 22, 1961. "[영화제작계 근황]", Kyunghyang Sinmun
- December 3, 1961. "촬영소식/「연산군」전편" 신정에 개봉/상영 5시간의 장척물 신문 Hankook Ilbo
- December 3, 1961. "[연예] 원커트/ 발랄한 용자 / 엄앵란양", Hankook Ilbo
- December 6, 1961. "[스폿트라이트] 한숨에 내달린 출세가도", The Dong-A Ilbo
- December 30, 1961. "국산대작이 볼만 / -신협-제작영화도 이색 / 정초 시내 개봉관 -프로-", Kyunghyang Sinmun
- Kotzathanasis, Panos (2021-06-04). "[HanCinema's Film Review] "Prince Yeonsan" + Full Movie".

== Bibliography ==
- 연산군. Cine21 (in Korean).

| New title | Grand Bell Awards for Best Film; 1962 | Succeeded by The Memorial Gate for Virtuous Women |
