= Shin Seong-il =

South Korean filmmaker and politician (1937–2018)

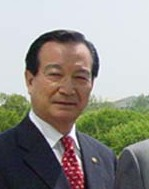
- Shin in 2004
- Born: May 8, 1937; Daegu, Korea, Empire of Japan
- Died: November 4, 2018 (aged 81); Hwasun, South Korea
- Spouse: Um Aing-ran (m. 1964)
- Children: 3

Korean name
- Hangul: 강신성일
- Hanja: 姜申星一
- RR: Gang Sinseongil
- MR: Kang Sinsŏngil

Stage name
- Hangul: 신성일
- Hanja: 申星一
- RR: Sin Seongil
- MR: Sin Sŏngil

Former name
- Hangul: 강신영
- Hanja: 姜信永
- RR: Gang Sinyeong
- MR: Kang Sinyŏng

Shin Seong-il (Korean: 신성일; May 8, 1937 – November 4, 2018) was a South Korean actor, film director, producer, and former politician. A legendary actor with 500 films in over 40 years, Shin debuted in director Shin Sang-ok's 1960 film A Romantic Papa and rose to fame through popular youth titles in the 1960s. A star in the 1960s and 1970s, his status as one of Korea's top actors extended well into the 1980s.

== Biography ==
Shin Seong-il was born in Daegu, South Korea.

His first major role was in Shin Sang-ok's A Romantic Papa (1960). Shin appears in 51 films that were released in 1967 alone. He also starred in 324 of the 1,194 films that were shown in Korea from 1964 to 1971.

In the early 1970s, Shin started working as a film director. In 1978, he entered politics and became a member of the 16th National Assembly before leaving politics and returning to acting. From 2002 to 2005, Shin was the director of the Korean Film Actors Association, serving for two terms (29th & 30th) before handing the position over to fellow actor Ahn Sung-ki.

Shin's last film was Door to the Night in 2013. In 2017, Shin Seong-il was the main subject of a retrospective at the 22nd Busan International Film Festival. Shin Seong-il died of lung cancer at the age of 81 on November 4, 2018. Filmmaker Lee Jang-ho was working with Shin shortly before he died with a script for an unreleased film titled Sohwakhaeong.

== Personal life ==
In 1964, Shin married Um Aing-ran. They have two daughters and a son.

== Filmography ==
Year	English title	Korean title	Romanization	Director
2005	Typhoon	태풍	Tae-poong	Kwak Kyung-taek
	Director Shin Sang-ok, The Hero of the Korean Movie			
	My Old Sweetheart		Ajji-appa	
	My Father, the Bodyguard		Appaneun bodigadeu	
	The Scent of Acacias in Your Arms		Geudaepum-e akasi-a hyang-gi	
	The General's Son 3		Janggun-ui adeul 3	
	Flower in Snow		Nunkkoch	
	The One and Only Life I Have		Ojig dan hanbeonppun-in nae-insaeng-inde	
	Beyond the Mountain		Sansan-i buseojin ileum-i-yeo	
	Who Saw The Dragon's Toenail?		Nuga yong-ui baltob-eul bo-ass-neun-ga	
	This Is How It Began		Yeogsaneun ileohge sijagdwaessda	
	Korean Connection		Koli-an keonegsyeon	
	Ma Yumi		Mayumi	
	Taekwondo Boy Ernie And Master Kim		Taekwonsonyeon Eony-wa mastar Kim	
	Woo-dam-ba-ra		Woo-dam-ba-ra	
1993	Watercolor Painting in a Rainy Day	비오는 날 수채화	Bioneun nal suchaehwa	Kwak Jae-yong
	Sand Castle		Moraeseong	
	Hong Do		Aesadang Hong Do	
	America, America		Amaerica, Amaerica	
	Desperate Fugitive		Pilsa-ui domangja	
	Gam-dong		Kkamdong	
	The Lady in the Wall		Byeoksok-ui buin	
	A Forest Where a Woman Breathes		Yeojaga sum-neon sub	
	Holy Night		Seongya	
	Reality		Daemul	
	Apricot Blossom in Snow for One Born in Seven Months		Chilsakdong-i-ui seoljungmae	
1987	Blue Heart		Beulru hateu	
	A Woman on the Verge		Wigi-ui yeoja	
	One-winged Angel		Hanjjoknalgae-ui cheonsa	
	Lethe's Love Song		Lete-ui yeonga	
	Ring of Hell		Jiok-ui ring	
	Heat of Youth 1987		'87 Maenbal-ui cheongchun	
	Moonlight Hunter		Dalbich sanyangkkun	
	Dancing Daughter		ChumChuneun ttal	
	Seoul is Cloudy With a Shower		Seowul heurim hanttae bi	
1986	Gilsotteum	길소뜸	Gilsotteum	Im Kwon-taek
1985	Mother	에미	Emi	Park Chul-soo
	I Like It just the Way It is Now		Jigeum idaeloga joh-a	
	The Oldest Son		Jangnam	
	Holy Mission			
	Three Days and Three Nights		Samil-naj samilbam	
	Free Maiden		Jayucheonyeo	
	Temptation		Yuhog	
	The Whereabouts of Eve		Hawa-ui haengbang	
1982	Come Unto Down	낮은 데로 임하소서	Najeun dero imhasoseo	Lee Jang-ho
	Sea Gull, Don't Fly Away		Baekguya hwolhwol nalji mara	
	The Chrysanthemum and the Clown		Ppierowa gukhwa	
	I Did Love		Naega salanghaessda	
	Dear Friend, Please Leave Quietly		Chingu-yeo jo-yonghi gada-o	
1982	The Story of Pan Jinlian	반금련	Ban Geum-ryeon	Kim Ki-young
	Hitman Sirasoni		Hyeobgaeg Silasoni	
	The Man Who Dies Every Day		Mae-il jugneun namja	
	She is Something		Geu yeoja salamjabne	
	The Man of the Past		Geuttae geusalam	
	One Night at a Strange Place		Nachseon gos-eseo halusbam	
	A Single Woman		Dogsinnyeo	
	A Love Song in a Peanut Shell		Ttangkongkkeobjil sog-ui yeonga	
	City Hunter		Dosi-ui sanyangkkun	
	The Rose That Swallowed Thorn		Gasileul samkin jangmi	
	The Terms of Love		Salang-ui jogeon	
	As a Woman		Yeoja-igi ttaemun-e	
	My Love Sun-ja		Sunja-ya	
	Under an Umbrella		Ga-eulbi usansog-e	
	King Sejong the Great		Sejongdae-wang	
	Young-ah's Confession		Yeonga-ui gobaeg	
	The Home of Stars 2		Byeoldeul-ui gohyang	
	Woman Walking on Asphalt		Aseupalteu-wi-ui yeoja	
	Butterfly Maiden		Nabisonyeo	
	Pyongyang's Secret Order		Pyeong-yang-ui bimiljilyeong	
	Hedgehog of the Third Quay		Jesambudu goseumdochi	
1977	Winter Woman	겨울여자	Gyeouryeoja	Kim Ho-sun (director)
	Japanese Invasion in the Year of Imjin and Gye Wol-hyang		Imjinlangwa Gye Wolhyang	
	Night Journey		Yahaeng	
	The Last Inning		Yeonggwang-ui 9hoemal	
	Forest Fire		Sanbul	
	Miss Yang's Adventure		MiseuYang-ui moheom	
	Wang Sib Ri, My Hometown		Wangsibli	
	There Is Tomorrow To Us		Uli-ege nae-il-eun issda	
	Ascetic		Geum-yog	
	Yes, Good-Bye Today		Geulae geulae oneul-eun an-nyeong	
	Blood Relations		Pisjul	
	You Become a Star, Too.		Neo ttohan byeol-i doe-eo	
	A Spy Remaining Behind		anlyucheobja	
	Violent Shaking		Gyeogdong	
	Bird of Paradise		Geuglagjo	
	Story of the Youth		Cheongchungeugjang	
	Woman Like A Crane		Hagnyeo	
	The Tae-Baeks		Taebaegsanmaeg	
	The 49th Day After Death		49je	
	A Teacher at Girls' High School		Yeogogyosa	
	A Hidden History of the Low Birth in Yi Dynasty		Ijo sangnobisa	
	The One Who I Should Meet		Manna-ya hal salam	
	Farewell 2		Ibyeol	
	Three Brothers		Adeul Samhyeongje	
	Arirang		Alilang	
	You and I, and Another		Neo-wa na geuligo tto hana	
	Ask With Eyes, Answer With a Face and Love is Forever in Bottom of your Heart		Nun-eulo mudgo eolgullo daedabhago ma-eumsog gadeughi salang-eun yeong-wonhi	
	Two Brothers		Daehyeong	
	Under the Sky of Sakhalin		Sahallin-ui haneulgwa ttang	
	It Is You		Geugeon neo	
1974	Heavenly Homecoming to Stars	별들의 고향	Byeoldeul-ui gohyang	Lee Jang-ho
	At 13 Years Old		Sipsamse Sonyeon	
	A Seagull's Dream		Galmaegi-ui kkum	
	A Flowery Bier		Kkochsang-yeo	
	A Girl Who Looks Like The Sun		Tae-yangdalm-eun sonyeo	
	The Wild Flowers in the Battle Field		Deulgughwaneun pi-eossneunde	
	Sweet Wind		Yeonpung	
	Lost Love		Gabeolin salang	
	Farewell		Ibyeol	
	Fire for Cleaning Hatred		Ssisgimbul	
	Biwon		Bi-won	
	Sigeodeun Tetoljina Malji		Sigeodeun tteolbjina malji	
	A Match		Seungbu	
	Bae Jeong-Ja, a Femme Fatale		Yohwa Bae Jeongja	
	Obaekhwa		Obaeghwa	
	Tto Sun Yi, a College Girl		Yeodaesaeng Ttosun-i	
	A Lodger's Life		Hasug-insaeng	
	Love Class		Ae-ingyosil	
	The Big Chase		Daechugyeog	
	A Cafe of September		9wol-ui chasjib	
	Youth in Barefoot		Cheongchun-eul maenballo	
	20 Years After the Independence and Baek Beom Kim Ku		Gwangbog 20nyeongwa Baekbeom Gim Gu	
	Wrath of an Angel		Cheonsa-ui bunno	
	A Family with Many Daughters		Ttalbujajib	
	Disembowelment		Halbog	
	Sunshine of the Face		Geu eolgul-e haessal-eul	
1973	The Three-Day Reign	삼일천하	Samilcheonha	Shin Sang-ok
	Non Gae, the Kisaeng		Nongae	
	A Wonderful Life		Meosjin insaeng	
	A Warrant for an Arrest		Chepolyeong	
	Blood Stream		Hyeollyu	
	A Ghost Affair		Yulyeongsodong	
	The Partner		Dong-eobja	
	One to One		Ildae-il	
	Kneel Down and Pray		Muleupkkulhgo billyeonda	
	Nationwide Graduates		Paldojol-eobsaeng	
	Ever Smiling, Mr. Park		Usgo saneun Bakseobang	
	On A Star Shining Night		Byeol-i bichnaneun bam-e	
	One Who Comes Back and the Other Who Has to Leave		Dol-a-on ja-wa tteona-ya hal ja	
	Gab Sun Yi, the Best Driver		Mobeom-unjeonsu Gapsun-i	
	When a Little Dream Blooms...		Jag-eun kkum-i kkochpil ttae	
	The Way for Man		Sana-i ganeun gil-e	
	An Honorable Student of Life		Insaeng-udeungsaeng	
	Zip up		Jyagkeuleul chae-wola	
	An Idle Love Affair		Buljangnan	
	A Woman Teacher		Yeoseonsaeng	
	The Midnight Sun		1972-->	
	Gate of Woman		Hongsalmun	
	Sim Cheong		Hyonyeo Cheong-i	
	Our Land of Korea		Uli-ui paldogangsan	
	Bang Ja and Hyang Dan-Yi		Bangja-wa Hyangdan-i	
	Pure Nineteen		Yeol-ahobsunjeong	
	A Second Mother		Duljjae-eomeoni	
	To Live and To Die		Salanghal ttae-wa jug-eul ttae	
	I'm Your Daughter		Jigeum-eun nam-ijiman	
	Cell-mates		Dongchangsaeng	
	Spring, Summer, Fall, and Winter		Bom yeoleum ga-eul geuligo gyeo-ul	
	Love		Ae	
	Confession		Gobaeg	
	A Sworn Brother		Uihyeong	
	Wild Dog		Deulgae	
	Between You and Me		Dangsingwa na sa-i-e	
	Best of Them All		Choegolo meosjin namja	
	Pier Three at Sunset		Hwanghon-ui je3budu	
	The Story of Chunhyang		Chunhyangjeon	
	Gapsun-i		Gapsun-i	
	Tomorrow's Scenery of Korea		Nae-il-ui paldogangsan	
	It Rains on the Heart of a Man		Sana-i gaseum-e biga naelinda	
	The Woman in the Waiting Room		Daehabsil-ui yeo-in	
	Is Your Husband Like This Too?		Daeg-ui appado ileohseubnikka	
	Let's Borrow Love		Salang-eul billibsida	
	Three Half-Brothers		Ibog 3hyeongje	
	A Nurse		Yumo	
	Kachusa		Kyachusa	
	The Lost Season		Ilh-eobeolin gyejeol	
	Two Sons 2		Du adeul	
	A Student of Life		Insaeng-yuhagsaeng	
	A Stranger in My Heart		Ta-in-i doen dangsin	
	Madame Mist		Angaebu-in	
	Love in the Snowfield		Seol-won-ui jeong	
	Two Women in the Rain		Bi-e jeoj-eun du yeo-in	
	Big Brother's Marriage		Gyeolhondaejagjeon	
	Yes, I'll Marry		Sijib-eun ga-yajyo	
	Cutest of them All		Choegolo meosjin namja	
	Oh! My Love		A! Im-a	
	The Woman Who Grabbed the Tiger's Tail		Holang-i kkolileul jab-eun yeoja	
	The Evening Bell		Manjong	
	My Dear Maria		Salanghaneun Mali-a	
	Because You Are a Woman		Yeoja-igi ttaemun-e	
	The Lost Wedding Veil		Ilh-eobeolin myeonsapo	
	When a Woman Removes Her Make-up		Yeojaga hwajang-eul ji-ul ttae	
	Night of Tokyo		Donggyeong-ui bamhaneul	
	Marriage Classroom		Gyeolhongyosil	
	How Can I Forget		Ij-eul suga iss-eulkka	
	Golden Operation 70 in Hong Kong		Hwanggeum70 Hongkongjagjeon	
	Man of Desires		Yogmang-ui sana-i	
	My Life in your Heart		Nae mogsum dangsin pum-e	
	A Wild Girl 2		Byeolmyeongbut-eun yeoja	
	Thy Name is Woman		Dangsin-eun yeoja	
	Army Unit 124		Il-isa gunbudae	
	The Night		Bam	
	Chastity		Sungyeol	
	Madame Shell		Solabu-in	
	A Woman with No Shadow		Geulimja eobsneun yeoja	
	Taming of the Shrewd		Cheonha-ilsaeg malgwallyang-i	
	Why Life is So Cruel to Women		Wae yeojaman-i ul-eo-ya hana	
	I'll Say Goodbye		Seulpeodo tteonajuma	
	Tearful Separation at Busan Harbor		Nunmuljeoj-eun Busanhang	
	Mi-ae		Cheongchunmujeong	
	Mistress		Manim	
	Love and Death		Ae-wa sa	
	The Woman Who Wanted an Apartment		Apateuleul gajgo sip-eun yeoja	
	What's the Use of Crying		Ulgineun wae ul-eo	
	Treason		Moban	
	Odd Bride		Byeolnan saedaeg	
	Golden Blues		Hwanggeumbuleuseu	
	Night of Seongbul Temple		Seongbulsaui Bam	
	The Bride's Diary		Sinbu-ilgi	
	After I Met You		Dangsin-eul algonaseo	
	A Woman Who Came a Long Away		Meondeseo on yeoja	
	A Cameilla Blossoms and Falls		Dongbaegkkoch pigojigo	
	Three Odd Ladies		Byeolnan yeoja	
	Fair Lady of Tapgol		Tabgol-assi	
	A Wanderer in Shanghai		Sanghae-ui banglangja	
	Nobody Said Anything		Amumaldo haji anh-assda	
	Does Anyone Know the Woman?		Nuga geu yeo-in-eul moleusina-yo	
	You've Made a Mistake		Jalmot Bosyeot-dagu	
	Bring Back the Night Once More		Geu Bamiyeo Dasi Hanbeon	
	Moments to Remember		Meomureugo Sipeotdeon Sungandeul	
	Sun of Young Man		Jeolmeuni-ui Tae-yang	
	In Your Arms		Jug-eodo Geudae Pume	
	Always Stranger		Eonjena Ta-in	
	Six Shadows		Yeoseotgae-ui Geurimja	
	The Sisters		Idaero Gandahaedo	
	Yun Sim-deok		Yun Sim-deok	
	Confess of Woman		Yeojaga Gobaeghal Ttae	
	Enuch		Naesi	
	A Barren Woman		Seongnyeo	
	Temporary Government in Shanghai		Sanghae Imsi Jeongbu Wa Kim Gu Seonsaeng	
	He Doesn't Know		Nam-ui Sogdo Moreugo	
	Black Cordon		Geomeun Bisangseon	
	Under the Roof		Eoneu Jibung Miteseo	
	Starting Point		Sibaljeom	
	Bye Bye Seoul		Seoul-iyeo Annyeong	
	Barber of Jangmaru Village		Jangmaruchon-ui Ibalsa	
	Jin and Min		Jug-eodo Joa	
	The Last Letter		Majimak Pyeonji	
	As Echoes Come Back		Sanulim Childdae Mada	
	Lost Love		Eoneu Haneul Araeseo	
	Rejected First Love		Amuri Mi-wodo	
	Empty Heart		Heomuhan Ma-eum	
	Woman in Apartment		Apateu-ui Yeoin	
	Wild Girl		Yaseongnyeo	
	Vice-President		Bu-gakha	
	Calm Life		Joyonghi Salgo Sipeo	
	Day Dream		Janghanmong	
	Invisible Man		Tumyeong Ingan	
	Until That Day		Neujeodo Geunalkkaji	
	Reminiscence		Chu-eog	
	Chaser		Chugyeogja	
	Original Intention		Chosim	
	First Night		Cheonnalbam Gabjagi	
	Destiny of My Load		Jeonha Eodiro Gasinaikka	
	One Step in the Hell		Hanbareun Jioge	
	Wind		Baram	
	Husband's House		Sidaeg	
	A Wonderer in Myeong-dong		Myeong-dong Nageune	
	Embrace		Po-ong	
	A Nicknamed Woman		Byeolmyeong Buteun Yeoja	
	Rebirth		Jaesaeng	
	Quick Ladder of Success		Chulsegado	
1968 (Released in 2005)	A Day Off	휴일	Hyuil	Lee Man-hee (director)
	The Wings of Lee Sang		Lee Sang-ui Nalgae	
	Madame Anemone		Anemone Madam	
	Blue Writings of Farewell		Paran Ibyeorui Geulssi	
	Noble Lady		Gwibuin	
	Madam Hwasan		Hwasandaek	
	I Won't Hate You		Miweohaji Angetda	
	Sobbing Swan		Heuneukkineun Baekjo	
	The General's Mustache		Janggun-ui Suyeom	
	Crossed Love		Eommaya Nunaya Gangbyeon Salja	
	The Son of the General		Daejwaui Adeul	
	Until When We See Again		Dasi Mannal Ttaekkaji	
	Chorus of Trees		Galosu-ui Hapchang	
1968	Woman	여	Yeo	Kim Ki-young, Jung Jin-woo, & Yu Hyun-mok
	A Devoted Love		Sunaebo	
	Bell of Emile		Emile Jong	
	Sorrow Over the Waves		Seulpeumeun Padoreul Neomeo	
	Snow Lady		Seolnyeo	
	White Night		Baegya	
	Acknowledgement		Nae Moksum Dahadorog	
	Eunuch		Naesi	
	Cloud		Gureum	
	Desire		Galmang	
	Secret of Affection		Mojeongui Bimil	
	Nightmare		Angmong	
	Correspondent in Tokyo		Donggyeong Teugpawon	
	A Man of Windstorm		Pokpung-ui Sanai	
	Burning Passions		Jeongyeom	
	Mistress Manong		Jeongbu Manong	
	Three-thousand Miles of Legend		Jeonseol-ddara Samcheon-ri	
	A Japanese		Ilbon-in	
1968	Femme Fatale, Jang Hee-bin	요화 장희빈	Yohwa Jang Huibin	Im Kwon-taek
	Jade Pin		Ok Binyeo	
	Older Woman		Yeonsang-ui Yeoin	
	A Journey		Yeoro	
	Shining Sadness		Chanranhan Seulpeum	
	Chunhyang		Chunhyang	
	Blue Light, Red Light		Cheongdeung Hongdeung	
	The Sorrow of Separation		Isu	
	Born in May		O wol-saeng	
1968	Fallen Leaves	낙엽	Nagyeop	Kang Dae-jin
	Vega		Jiknyeoseong	
	Herb of Longing		Sangsacho	
	Living in the Sky		Changgong-e Sanda	
	Confessions of Youth		Cheongchun Gobaek	
	A Young Zelkova		Jeolmeun Neutinamu	
	Oblivion		Manggak	
	The Secretariat		Biseosil	
	The Body's Destination		Yugcheui Gil, The Way of All Flesh	
	Four Sisters		Nejamae	
	United Front		Yeonhapjeonseon	
	An Early Morning Departure		Saebyeok Gil	
	Gang Myeong-hwa		Gang Myeong-hwa	
	A Phantom		Hwanyeong	
	Bachelor Daughter-in-law		Haksa Myeoneuri	
	The White Crow		Hayan Kkamagwi	
	Disclosure		Pongno	
	A Deviation		Talseon	
	Others		Taindeul	
	Bachelor Governor		Chonggak Wonnim	
	Lovers on Grassland		Chowonui Yeonindeul	
	The Sun and the Moon		Irwol	
	Passion		Yeoljeong	
	The Way of a Lover		Yeoninui Gil	
	Stroller		Yeogma	
	Youth with Scars		Sangcheoppunin Cheongchun	
	Lingering Attachment		Miryeon	
	Mubeonji		Mubeonji	
	Madam of Myeong-wol Kwan		Myeong-wolgwan Assi	
	Deep in my Heart		1967-->	
	The Third Youth		Jesamui Cheongchun	
	The King's First Love		Imgeumnimui Cheotsarang	
	Imjin River		Imjingang	
	Dongsimcho		Dongsimcho	
	Dolmuji		Dolmusi	
	Tomorrow, I Will Smile		Naeireun Utja	
	I Live as I Please		Nae Meose Sanda	
	A Traveling King		Nageune Imgeum	
	A College Girl Asking for Direction		Gil-eul Munneun Yeodaesaeng	
	Hometown		Gohyang	
	I Want to Go		Gagopa	
	Sorrowful Youth		Cheongchun Geukjang	
	The Starting Point		Wonjeom	
	Sound of Magpies		Ggachi Sori	
1967	Mist	안개	Angae	Kim Soo-yong
	The Three Hen-pecked Generations		Gongcheoga samdae	
	A Female Student President		Yeodaesaeng Sajang	
	A Misty Grassland		Angaekkin Chowon	
	A Honeymoon		Mirwol	
	A Full Danger		Wiheomeun Gadeuki	
	The Whole Night		Jong-ya	
	Hail		Bing-u	
	Man from the South, Woman from the North		Namnam Buknyeo	
1967	Why the Cuckoo Cries	두견새 우는 사연	Dugyeonsae uneun sayeon	Lee Kyu-woong
	A Girl from Samcheonpo		Samcheonpo Agassi	
	Tarantula		Dokgeomi	
	A Story of a Nobleman		Yangbanjeon	
	The Loser and the Winner		Ireun Jawa Chajeun Ja	
	I Will Be a King for the Day		Oneul-eun Wang	
	Wiheomhan Cheongchun			
	Early Rain		Chou	
	A Coral Door		Sanhoui Mun	
	Showdown of Body		Yukcheui Daegyeol	
	Father's Youth		Appaui Cheongchun	
	I Am a Free Man		Nae Mome Juineun Eopda	
1966	The Student Boarder	하숙생	Hasuksaeng	Jung Jin-woo
	Phoenix		Bulsajo	
	I Want to Say Good-bye on a Rainy Night		Bioneun Bame Tteonago Sibda	
	Seven Rowdies		Chil-inui Nanpokja	
	A Swivel Chair		Hoejeonuija	
	The 76th Prison Camp		Je 76 Poro Suyongso	
	I Am a King		Naneun Wang-ida	
	A Long Journey		Gin Yeoro	
	A Hero Without Serial Number		Gunbeon-eobsneun Yongsa	
	Villains Era		Aginsidae	
	Hit the Bull's Eye		Baekbalbaekjung	
	Fleeting Life		Harusal-i Insaeng	
	A Burning Youth		Bultaneun Cheongchun	
	Yeraehyang		Yerahyang	
	A Gisaeng with a Bachelor's Degree		Haksa Gisaeng	
	How's Your Wife?		Daegui Buineun Eoddeosimnigga	
	A Black Design Scarf		Geomeun munui-ui mahura	
	Black-haired Youth		Heukbarui Cheongchun	
	An Island Girl		Seomsaeksi	
	My Days Set in the Twilight		Nae Cheongchun Hwanghon-e Jida	
	Forbidden Lips		Geumjidoen Ibsul	
	Full Autumn		Manchu	
	Gunsmoke		Choyeon	
	Emergency Wedding		Teukgeub Gyeolhon Jakjeon	
	Terminal		Jongjeom	
	A Paper Boat Love		Jong-ibaeui Yeonjeong	
	No. 0, the Third Pier		Jesambudu Yeongbeonji	
	Confession of a Rose		Jangmiui Gobaek	
	Five Scoundrels		Oinui Geondal	
	No. 1, Mujeong Street		Mujeongga Ilbeonji	
	Horse-year Bride		Maltti Sinbu	
	Major Kang Jae-gu		Soryeong Kang Jae-gu	
	A Popular Woman		Somunnan Yeoja	
	The Merciless 40 Stairs		Mujeong-ui Sasip Gyedan	
	The Sworn Brothers		Uihyeongje	
	The Night of Sadness		Aesu-ui Bam	
	The Ran's Elegy		Ran-ui Biga	
	The Life in the Red Figures		Jeokjainsaeng	
	The Last Passion		Majimak Jeong-yeol	
	Heukmaek		Heukmaek	
	Look Up the Sky and Look Down the Earth		Haneulbogo Ttang-eul Bogo	
	Let Me Rest under the Blue Starlight		Pureunbyeol-arae Jamdeulge Hara	
	The Legal Wife		Keundaek	
	The Love Affair		Jeongsa	
	Lee Su-il and Shim Sun-ae		I Suilgwa Sim Sunae	
1965	To the End of the World	이 세상 끝까지	I sesang Kkeutkkaji	Go Yeong-nam
	The Field Glow with the Setting Sun		No-euljin Deullyeok	
	I Don't Want to Die		Naneun Jukgi Silta	
	The Smile at the Rotary		Rotary-ui Miso	
	For Whom He Resist		Nugureul Wihan Banhang-inya	
	The Woman Coming in Fall		Ga-eul-e On Yeo-in	
	Throw Out Your Chest		Gaseum-eul Pyeora	
	The Great Sokgulam Cave Temple		Dae Seoggul-am	
	Missing You to Death		Jukdorok Bogo Sip-eo	
	The First Love		cheossarang	
1965	The Shadow of the Sun	태양의 그림자	Taeyang-ui Geurimja	Jeong In-yeob
	When a Woman Goes Over the Hill		Yeojaga Gogaereul Neom-eulttae	
	Lion in the Dark World		Amheukga-ui Saja	
	A Rooster Man		Sutakgat-eun Sana-i	
	The Angry Heroes		Seongnan Yeong-ungdeul	
	The Heir		Sangsokja	
	Love is Terrible		Sarang-eun Museo-wo	
	Bad Girl Jang-mi		Bullyang Sonyeo Jang-mi	
	Wind, Please Tell Me		Baram-a Malhara	
	The Secret Meeting		Milhoe	
	The Empty Dream		Chunmong	
	The Bachelor Pub		Haksa Jujeom	
	The Three-forked Crossing of Cheon-an		Cheon-an Samgeori	
	Please Bury me Deeply		Nareul Gipi Mudeojuo	
	The Maiden City		Cheo-nyeo Dosi	
	Run with Bare Feet		Maenballo Ttwi-eola	
	The Thirsty Youth		Cheongchuneun Mongmareuda	
	The Peacock Lady		Gongjakbu-in	
	The Lost Sun		Ireobeorin Taeyang	
	The Beautiful Maid		Ippeuni	
	Let's Walk As Looking Up		Wireul Bogo Geotja	
	The Lovebirds Boat		Wonangseon	
	Don't Sing, Water Bird		Uljimara Mulsae-ya	
	The Result of the Ambition		Yokmang-ui Gyeolsan	
	The Completion of Love		Yeonae Joleobban	
	The Girl Is Nineteen		Yeoja Sipguse	
	The Father at Sinchon and The Daughter at Myeongdong		Sinchon-abeoji-wa Myeongdong ttal	
	The Saja Castle		Saja Seong	
	The Distorted Youth		Binnagan Cheongchun	
	My Dear		Bogosipeun Eolgul	
	Betrayal		Baesin	
	The Wanton Cats		Baramnan Goyangideul	
	The Thirsty Trees		Mokmareun Namudeul	
	The Korean Instrument with 12 Strings		Ga-yageum	
	The Camellia Girl		Dongbaek-agassi	
	The Secret Service Agent in the Continent		Daeryugui Milsa	
	The Student Couple		Haksaeng Bubu	
	The Regular Customers		Dangol Sonnim	
	My Mind Is Like a Lake		Naemaeum-eun Hosu	
	The Pickled Radishes		Chonggak Gimchi	
	Keep Silent When Leaving		Tteonal Ddaeneun Mareopossi	
1964	Barefooted Youth	맨발의 청춘	Maenbarui cheongchun	Kim Ki-duk (director, born 1934)
	Are You Really a Beauty?		Niga Jalna Ilsaeg-inya	
	The Opium War		Apyeong Jeonjaeng	
	The Younger Brother-in-law		Sidongsaeng	
	The Single Mom		Hol-eomeoni	
	I Don't Want to Be Forgiven		Yongseobadgi Silta	
	The Daughter's Medal		Ttal-ui Hunjang	
	Women of Spirit		Maltti Yeodaesaeng	
1963	Daughters of Pharmacist Kim	김약국의 딸들	Gimyakgugui ttaldeul	Yu Hyun-mok
	For My Husband		Mangbuseok	
1963	Bloodline	혈맥	Hyeolmaek	Kim Soo-yong
	No. 77 Miss Kim		Chisipchilbeon Miss Kim	
	The Classroom of Youth		Cheongchun Gyosil	
	The Stepmother		Sae-eomma	
	The Man's Tears		Sanaiui Nunmul	
	A Reluctance Prince		Ganghwadoryeong	
	00:15 Train from Daejeon		Daejeonbal Yeongsi Osibbun	
	An Aristocrat's Love Affair		Donbaram Nimbaram	
	Until Peonies Bloom		Morani Pigikkajineun	
	Hope		Gaseume kkumeun gadeukhi	
	The Angry Apple		Seongnan Neunggeum	
	Private Tutor		Gajeonggyosa	
	The Overbridge of Hyeonhae Strait		Hyeonhaetan-ui Gureumdari	
	Miss Kim's Double Life		Miss Kim-ui Ijungsaenghwal	
1962	Revenge		Wonhanui Irwoldo	
	The Best Bride and a Plain Young Man		Teukdeungsinbu-wa Samdeung Sillang	
	Farewell to My Adolescence		Sachungi-yeo Annyeong	
1962	Tyrant Yeonsan	폭군연산	Pokgun Yeonsan	Shin Sang-ok
	Only for You		Akkimeobsi Juryeonda	
	Under the Sky of Seoul		Seoul-ui Jibungmit	
1961	Prince Yeonsan	연산군	Yeonsan-gun	Shin Sang-ok
	Evergreen Tree		Sangnoksu	
	A Love History/ History of Love		Sarang-ui yeogsa	
1960	A Romantic Papa	로맨스 빠빠	Lomaenseuppappa	Shin Sang-ok
	Madame White Snake		Baeksabu-in	
	Till Death		I saengmyeong dahadorok	

=== Director ===
Year	English title	Korean title	Romanization
1974	It Is You	그건 너	Geugeon neo
1971	Spring, Summer, Fall, and Winter	봄 여름 가을 그리고 겨울	Bom yeoleum ga-eul geuligo gyeo-ul
1971	Lovers' Classroom	연애교실	Yeon-aegyosil
1971	A Love Story	신성일	Eoneu salangui iyagi

=== Planner ===
Year	English title	Korean title	Romanization	Director
1990	Korean Connection	코리안 커넥션	Koli-an keonegsyeon	Go Yeong-nam

=== Producer ===
Year	English title	Korean title	Romanization	Role	Director
	Beyond the Mountain		Sansan-i buseojin ileum-i-yeo		
	Teenage Love Song		Yeol-ahob jeolmangkkeut-e buleuneun hana-ui salangnolae		

== Awards ==
- 1963 1st Blue Dragon Film Awards : Favorite Actor
- 1964 2nd Blue Dragon Film Awards : Favorite Actor
- 1965 3rd Blue Dragon Film Awards : Favorite Actor
- 1966 4th Blue Dragon Film Awards : Favorite Actor
- 1968 7th Grand Bell Awards : Best Actor for The Wings of Lee Sang
- 1970 6th Baeksang Arts Awards : Favorite Film Actor
- 1971 7th Baeksang Arts Awards : Favorite Film Actor
- 1972 8th Baeksang Arts Awards : Best New Actor for play Spring, summer, fall, and winter
- 1972 8th Baeksang Arts Awards : Favorite Film Actor
- 1973 9th Baeksang Arts Awards : Favorite Film Actor
- 1974 10th Baeksang Arts Awards : Favorite Film Actor
- 1975 11th Baeksang Arts Awards : Favorite Film Actor
- 1978 14th Baeksang Arts Awards : Best Film Actor for Winter Woman
- 1986 25th Grand Bell Awards : Best Supporting Actor for Moonlight Hunter
- 1987 23rd Baeksang Arts Awards : Best Film Actor for Lethe's Love Song
- 1989 27th Grand Bell Awards : Best Actor for Korean Connection
- 1991 15th Golden Cinematography : Favorite Actor
- 2004 41st Grand Bell Awards : Special Achievement Award
- 2011 47th Baeksang Arts Awards : Lifetime Achievement Award
- 2018 Korea Best Star Awards: Achievement Award

== Election results ==
Year	Elections	Constituency	Political party	Votes (%)	Results
1981	11th National Assembly General Election	Yongsan–Mapo (Seoul)	KNP	50,169 (14.81%)	Defeated (3rd)
1996	15th National Assembly General Election	Dong A (Daegu)	NKP	15,572 (20.80%)	Defeated (2nd)
2000	16th National Assembly General Election	Dong (Daegu)	GNP	88,258 (67.18%)	Won
