= Lee Seong-gye King Taejo =

- Hangul: 태조 이성계
- RR: Taejo I Seonggye
- MR: T'aejo I Sŏnggye
- Directed by: Choe In-hyeon
- Written by: Choi Keum-dong; Lee Jeong-seon; Na So-yun; Yu Il-su; Jang Cheon-ho
- Produced by: Kwak Jeong-hwan
- Starring: Shin Young-kyun; Kim Ji-mee
- Cinematography: Lyou Jae-hyoung
- Edited by: Kim Hee-su
- Music by: Jeong Yoon-joo
- Release date: June 24, 1965
- Running time: 119 minutes
- Country: South Korea
- Language: Korean

Lee Seong-gye King Taejo (Korean: 태조 이성계) is a 1965 South Korean film directed by Choe In-hyeon and starring Shin Young-kyun and Kim Ji-mee. It is based on King Taejo.

== Plot ==
Lee Seong-gye is an ordinary man, the second son of Lee Ja-chun, who passes a state military examination in his early age and becomes a general who defeats his enemies and become Chief. Seong-rye takes power against King Gongyang who is responsible for the death of his father and older brother. He leads his army and defeats Gongyang's soldiers. Seong-gye becomes King and is renamed as Taejo of Joseon.

== Cast ==
- Shin Young-kyun
- Kim Ji-mee
- Park Nou-sik
- Lee Kyoung-hee
- Kim Wun-Ha
- Yang Hun
- Do Kum-bong
- Park Am
- Kim Dong-won
- Heo Jang-kang
