= Bloodline (1963 film) =

- Theatrical poster for Bloodline (1963)
- Hangul: 혈맥
- Hanja: 血脈
- RR: Hyeolmaek
- MR: Hyŏlmaek
- Directed by: Kim Soo-yong
- Written by: Kim Yeong-su
- Produced by: Baek Won
- Starring: Kim Seung-ho
- Cinematography: Jeon Jo-Myeong
- Edited by: Yu Jae-won
- Music by: Jeong Yun-ju
- Distributed by: Hanyang Films
- Release date: October 3, 1963
- Running time: 81 minutes
- Country: South Korea
- Language: Korean
- Box office: $32

Bloodline (Korean: 혈맥), also known as Kinship, is a 1963 South Korean drama film directed by Kim Soo-yong. It was chosen as Best Film at the Grand Bell Awards and the Blue Dragon Film Awards.

== Plot ==
An anti-communist film based on a play by Kim Su-yeong from 1948. The film depicts conflict between the generations in a village. The elders want their children to follow the old ways, but the children pursue a newer way of life and end up supporting their parents.

== Cast ==
- Kim Seung-ho: Kim Deok-sam
- Hwang Jung-seun: Bok-soong's mother
- Shin Seong-il
- Um Aing-ran: Bok-soong
- Kim Ji-mee: Ok-hee
- Choi Nam-hyun: Bok-soong's father
- Shin Young-kyun: Older brother
- Choi Moo-ryong: Younger brother
- Jo Mi-ryeong
- Joo Sun-tae

== Bibliography ==
- "Hyeolmaek". The Complete Index to World Film. Archived from the original on 2012-04-06.
- 혈맥. Cine21 (in Korean).
