= Rice (1963 film) =

1963 film

- Film poster
- Directed by: Shin Sang-ok
- Written by: Kim Kang-yun
- Produced by: Shin Sang-ok
- Starring: Shin Young-kyun
- Cinematography: Kim Yeong-in
- Edited by: Yang Seong-ran
- Music by: Jeong Yoon-joo
- Production company: Shin Films
- Release date: 16 November 1963
- Running time: 124 minutes
- Country: South Korea
- Language: Korean
- Budget: $1,388

Rice (Korean: 쌀, translit. Ssal) is a 1963 South Korean drama film directed by Shin Sang-ok. The film was selected as the South Korean entry for the Best Foreign Language Film at the 39th Academy Awards, but was not accepted as a nominee.

== Plot ==
The farmers of Muju, Cheonbuk Province, are not only poor, one year they don't even have enough water to irrigate their rice paddies. Despite many attempts to dig a canal to the Geum River, they fail every single time.

Throughout these difficulties, the villagers find the strength to endure, until at last the military coup of 1961 brings in a government that gives them the support they need to escape starvation and ruin.

== Cast ==
- Shin Young-kyun
- Choi Eun-hee
- Namkoong Won
- Lee Ki-hong

== See also ==
- List of submissions to the 39th Academy Awards for Best Foreign Language Film
- List of South Korean submissions for the Academy Award for Best Foreign Language Film
