= Tyrant Yeonsan =

- Theatrical poster for Tyrant Yeonsan (1962)
- Hangul: 폭군 연산
- Hanja: 暴君 燕山
- RR: Pokgun Yeonsan
- MR: P'okkun Yŏnsan
- Directed by: Shin Sang-ok
- Written by: Lim Hee-jae
- Produced by: Shin Sang-ok
- Starring: Shin Yeong-gyun; Do Kum-bong; Kim Jin-kyu; Lee Yea-chun; Kim Hye-jeong
- Cinematography: Jeong Hae-jun
- Edited by: Yang Seong-ran; Kim Young-hee
- Music by: Jeong Yoon-joo
- Distributed by: Shin Films
- Release date: February 5, 1962
- Running time: 132 minutes
- Country: South Korea
- Language: Korean

Tyrant Yeonsan (Korean: 폭군 연산) is a 1962 South Korean historical drama film directed by Shin Sang-ok. It is the sequel to the 1961 film Prince Yeonsan. It chronicles the tyrannical reign of King Yeonsangun of Joseon.
