= Blue Dragon Film Awards =

South Korean film awards

- Hangul: 청룡영화상
- Hanja: 靑龍映畫賞
- RR: Cheongnyong yeonghwasang
- MR: Ch'ŏngnyong yŏnghwasang
- Awarded for: Excellence in cinematic achievements
- Country: South Korea
- Presented by: Sports Chosun
- First award: November 30, 1963; 62 years ago
- Final award: 2025
- Website: www.blueaward.co.kr

Television/radio coverage
- Network: KBS (present); SBS (2011-2020)

The Blue Dragon Film Awards (Korean: 청룡영화상; RR: Cheongnyong Yeonghwasang), previously known as Joseon Ilbo Film Awards Korean: 조선일보영화상; RR: Joseon Ilbo Yeonghwasang, is an annual awards ceremony that is presented by Sports Chosun (a sister brand of the Chosun Ilbo) for excellence in film in South Korea.

Nominees are determined by online voting of the audience and opinions of film experts. The winners are selected by a judging committee, that is recommended by the executive committee of the awards.

The Blue Dragon Film Awards and Grand Bell Awards are the most popular film awards in South Korea.

== History ==
It was created in 1963 by The Chosun Ilbo newspaper and discontinued in 1973. Sports Chosun, a Korean sports daily also owned by The Chosun Ilbo, resurrected the ceremony in 1990 and it has been held annually since then.

The 42nd Blue Dragon Film Awards ceremony was held on November 26, 2021, at KBS Hall in Yeouido, Seoul. In this edition, 18 categories were awarded. The nominations for 15 categories were announced for the Korean films released from October 30, 2020, to October 14, 2021, on November 1, 2021.

The 44th Blue Dragon Film Awards ceremony was held on November 24, 2023, at KBS Hall in Yeouido, Seoul. It was hosted by Kim Hye-soo for the last time and Yoo Yeon-seok. Smugglers, a crime film by Ryoo Seung-wan won four awards including Best Film, Best Supporting Actor, Best New Actress, and Best Music awards.

On September 24, 2024 Han Ji-min was appointed 'Blue Dragon Goddess', succeeding Kim Hye-soo. She will be master of ceremonies for the 45th Blue Dragon Film Awards, to be held at KBS Hall in Yeouido, Seoul on November 29, 2024.

== Current categories ==
- Best Film
- Best Director
- Best Actor
- Best Actress
- Best Supporting Actor
- Best Supporting Actress
- Best New Director
- Best New Actor
- Best New Actress
- Best Screenplay
- Best Short Film
- Best Art Direction
- Best Cinematography and Lighting
- Best Editing
- Best Music
- Technical Award

== Popular Awards ==
=== Popular Star Award ===
Popular Star Award
#	Year	Actor/Actress	Film
1	1963	Shin Seong-il	
1	1963	Um Aing-ran	
2	1964	Shin Young-kyun	
2	1964	Shin Seong-il	
2	1964	Kim Jin-kyu	
2	1964	Um Aing-ran	
2	1964	Tae Hyun-sil	
2	1964	Choi Eun-hee	
3	1965	Kim Jin-kyu	
3	1965	Shin Seong-il	
3	1965	Shin Young-kyun	
3	1965	Kim Ji-mee	
3	1965	Um Aing-ran	
3	1965	Tae Hyun-sil	
4	1966	Kim Jin-kyu	
4	1966	Shin Seong-il	
4	1966	Shin Young-kyun	
4	1966	Ko Eun-ah	
4	1966	Kim Ji-mee	
4	1966	Choi Eun-hee	
5	1967	Kim Jin-kyu	
5	1967	Shin Seong-il	
5	1967	Shin Young-kyun	
5	1967	Kim Ji-mee	
5	1967	Nam Jeong-im	
5	1967	Yoon Jeong-hee	
6	1969	Kim Jin-kyu	
6	1969	Shin Seong-il	
6	1969	Shin Young-kyun	
6	1969	Nam Jeong-im	
6	1969	Moon Hee	
6	1969	Yoon Jeong-hee	
7	1970	Namkoong Won	
7	1970	Shin Seong-il	
7	1970	Shin Young-kyun	
7	1970	Nam Jeong-im	
7	1970	Moon Hee	
7	1970	Yoon Jeong-hee	
8	1971	Namkoong Won	
8	1971	Shin Seong-il	
8	1971	Shin Young-kyun	
8	1971	Kim Ji-mee	
8	1971	Moon Hee	
8	1971	Yoon Jeong-hee	
9	1972	Choi Moo-ryong	
9	1972	Shin Seong-il	
9	1972	Park No-sik	
9	1972	Yoon Jeong-hee	
9	1972	Kim Ji-mee	
9	1972	Ko Eun-ah	
10	1973	Park No-sik	
10	1973	Shin Seong-il	
10	1973	Choi Moo-ryong	
10	1973	Ko Eun-ah	
10	1973	Kim Chang-sook	
10	1973	Yoon Jeong-hee	
11	1990	Ahn Sung-ki	
11	1990	Park Sang-min	General's Son
11	1990	Choi Jin-sil	
11	1990	Hwang Shin-hye	The Woman Who Walks on Water
12	1991	Choi Min-soo	
12	1991	Park Sang-min	General's Son II
12	1991	Choi Jin-sil	
12	1991	Lee Hye-sook	Silver Stallion
13	1992	Ahn Sung-ki	
13	1992	Choi Min-soo	
13	1992	Choi Jin-sil	
13	1992	Shim Hye-jin	
14	1993	Choi Min-soo	
14	1993	Lee Geung-young	
14	1993	Choi Jin-sil	
14	1993	Kang Soo-yeon	
15	1994	Park Joong-hoon	
15	1994	Lee Geung-young	
15	1994	Choi Jin-sil	
15	1994	Shim Hye-jin	
16	1995	Park Joong-hoon	
16	1995	Choi Min-soo	Terrorist
16	1995	Jung Sun-kyung	
16	1995	Choi Jin-sil	
17	1996	Park Joong-hoon	Two Cops 2
17	1996	Kim Min-jong	The Gate of Destiny
17	1996	Shim Hye-jin	The Adventures of Mrs. Park
17	1996	Jung Sun-kyung	
18	1997	Han Suk-kyu	No. 3
18	1997	Park Joong-hoon	
18	1997	Shin Eun-kyung	Downfall
18	1997	Choi Jin-sil	
19	1998	Han Suk-kyu	Christmas in August
19	1998	Park Shin-yang	The Letter
19	1998	Shim Eun-ha	Christmas in August
19	1998	Choi Jin-sil	The Letter
20	1999	Han Suk-kyu	Shiri
20	1999	Jung Woo-sung	Phantom: The Submarine
20	1999	Shim Eun-ha	Art Museum by the Zoo
20	1999	Jeon Do-yeon	The Harmonium in My Memory
21	2000	Yoo Ji-tae	Ditto
21	2000	Jang Dong-gun	Anarchists
21	2000	Kim Hee-sun	Bichunmoo
21	2000	Jeon Do-yeon	Happy End
22	2001	Lee Byung-hun	Bungee Jumping of Their Own
22	2001	Jang Dong-gun	Friend
22	2001	Jung Woo-sung	Musa: The Warrior
22	2001	Kim Hee-sun	Wanee & Junah
22	2001	Shin Eun-kyung	My Wife Is a Gangster
22	2001	Lee Mi-yeon	Indian Summer
23	2002	Jung Joon-ho	Marrying the Mafia
23	2002	Cha Tae-hyun	Lovers' Concerto
23	2002	Kim Jung-eun	Marrying the Mafia
23	2002	Jeon Do-yeon	No Blood No Tears
24	2003	Bae Yong-joon	Untold Scandal
24	2003	Cha Tae-hyun	Crazy First Love
24	2003	Jang Jin-young	Singles
24	2003	Son Ye-jin	The Classic
25	2004	Kwon Sang-woo	Once Upon a Time in High School
25	2004	Gang Dong-won	Temptation of Wolves
25	2004	Kim Jung-eun	How to Keep My Love
25	2004	Moon Geun-young	My Little Bride
26	2005	Cho Seung-woo	Marathon
26	2005	Gang Dong-won	Duelist
26	2005	Kim Soo-mi	Mapado, Marrying the Mafia II
26	2005	Ha Ji-won	Duelist
27	2006	Shin Hyun-joon	Barefoot Ki-bong
27	2006	Lee Joon-gi	King and the Clown
27	2006	Kim Hye-soo	Tazza: The High Rollers
27	2006	Kang Sung-yeon	King and the Clown
28	2007	Hwang Jung-min	Happiness
28	2007	Joo Jin-mo	A Love
28	2007	Kim Ah-joong	200 Pounds Beauty
28	2007	Kim Tae-hee	The Restless
29	2008	Sul Kyung-gu	Public Enemy Returns
29	2008	Jung Woo-sung	The Good, the Bad, the Weird
29	2008	Son Ye-jin	My Wife Got Married
29	2008	Kim Ha-neul	Lovers of Six Years
30	2009	Lee Byung-hun	G.I. Joe: The Rise of Cobra
30	2009	Ha Jung-woo	Take Off
30	2009	Ha Ji-won	Closer to Heaven
30	2009	Choi Kang-hee	Goodbye Mom
31	2010	Won Bin	The Man from Nowhere
31	2010	T.O.P	71: Into the Fire
31	2010	Son Ye-jin	White Night
31	2010	Jo Yeo-jeong	The Servant
32	2011	Go Soo	The Front Line
32	2011	Gong Yoo	Silenced
32	2011	Choi Kang-hee	Petty Romance
32	2011	Kim Hye-soo	Villain and Widow
33	2012	Ha Jung-woo	Nameless Gangster: Rules of the Time
33	2012	Kim Soo-hyun	The Thieves
33	2012	Gong Hyo-jin	Love Fiction
33	2012	Bae Suzy	Architecture 101
34	2013	Lee Byung-hun	G.I. Joe: Retaliation, Red 2
34	2013	Sul Kyung-gu	Hope, Cold Eyes
34	2013	Gong Hyo-jin	Boomerang Family
34	2013	Kim Min-hee	Very Ordinary Couple
35	2014	Kim Woo-bin	Friend: The Great Legacy
35	2014	Song Seung-heon	Obsessed
35	2014	Yim Si-wan	The Attorney
35	2014	Shin Se-kyung	Tazza: The Hidden Card
36	2015	Kim Seol-hyun	Gangnam Blues
36	2015	Lee Min-ho	Gangnam Blues
36	2015	Park Bo-young	The Silenced
36	2015	Park Seo-joon	The Chronicles of Evil
37	2016	Jung Woo-sung	Asura: The City of Madness
37	2016	Son Ye-jin	The Last Princess
37	2016	Bae Doona	The Tunnel
37	2016	Jun Kunimura	The Wailing
38	2017	Na Moon-hee	I Can Speak
38	2017	Sul Kyung-gu	The Merciless
38	2017	Zo In-sung	The King
38	2017	Kim Su-an	The Battleship Island
39	2018	Ju Ji-hoon	The Spy Gone North
39	2018	Kim Young-kwang	On Your Wedding Day
39	2018	Kim Hyang-gi	Along with the Gods: The Two Worlds
39	2018	Jin Seo-yeon	Believer
40	2019	Lee Kwang-soo	Inseparable Bros
40	2019	Park Hyung-sik	Juror 8
40	2019	Lee Hanee	Extreme Job
40	2019	Im Yoon-ah	Exit
41	2020	Yoo Ah-in	Voice of Silence
41	2020	Jung Yu-mi	Kim Ji-young: Born 1982
42	2021	Im Yoon-ah	Miracle: Letters to the President
42	2021	Koo Kyo-hwan	Escape from Mogadishu
42	2021	Song Joong-ki	Space Sweepers
42	2021	Jeon Yeo-been	Night in Paradise
43	2022	Im Yoon-ah	Confidential Assignment 2: International
43	2022	Daniel Henney	Confidential Assignment 2: International
43	2022	Go Kyung-pyo	Decision to Leave
43	2022	Lee Ji-eun	Broker
44	2023	Song Joong-ki	Hopeless
44	2023	Zo In-sung	Smugglers
44	2023	Kim Seon-ho	The Childe
44	2023	Park Bo-young	Concrete Utopia
45	2024	Koo Kyo-hwan	
45	2024	Jung Hae-in	I, the Executioner
45	2024	Lim Ji-yeon	Revolver
45	2024	Tang Wei	Wonderland
46	2025	Im Yoon-ah	Pretty Crazy
46	2025	Son Ye-jin	No Other Choice
46	2025	Hyun Bin	Harbin
46	2025	Park Jin-young	Hi-Five

=== Audience Choice Award for Most Popular Film ===
Audience Choice Award for Most Popular Film
#	Year	Film	Director
11	1990	General's Son	Im Kwon-taek
12	1991	General's Son II	Im Kwon-taek
13	1992	Marriage Story	Kim Ui-seok
14	1993	Sopyonje	Im Kwon-taek
15	1994	Two Cops	Kang Woo-suk
16	1995	Dr. Bong	Lee Kwang-hoon
17	1996	Two Cops 2	Kang Woo-suk
18	1997	The Contact	Chang Yoon-hyun
19	1998	The Letter	Lee Jung-gook
20	1999	Shiri	Kang Je-gyu
21	2000	Joint Security Area	Park Chan-wook
22	2001	Friend	Kwak Kyung-taek
23	2002	Marrying the Mafia	Jeong Heung-sun
24	2003	Memories of Murder	Bong Joon-ho
25	2004	Taegukgi	Kang Je-gyu
26	2005	Welcome to Dongmakgol	Park Kwang-hyun
27	2006	The Host	Bong Joon-ho
28	2007	D-War	Shim Hyung-rae
29	2008	The Good, the Bad, the Weird	Kim Jee-woon
30	2009	Haeundae	Yoon Je-kyoon
31	2010	The Man from Nowhere	Lee Jeong-beom
32	2011	War of the Arrows	Kim Han-min
33	2012	The Thieves	Choi Dong-hoon
34	2013	Miracle in Cell No. 7	Lee Hwan-kyung
35	2014	The Admiral: Roaring Currents	Kim Han-min
36	2015	Ode to My Father	Yoon Je-kyoon
37	2016	Train to Busan	Yeon Sang-ho
38	2017	A Taxi Driver	Jang Hoon
39	2018	Along with the Gods: The Two Worlds	Kim Yong-hwa
40	2019	Extreme Job	Lee Byeong-heon
41	2020	Ashfall	Lee Hae-jun, Kim Byung-seo
42	2021	Escape from Mogadishu	Ryoo Seung-wan
43	2022	The Roundup	Lee Sang-yong
44	2023	The Roundup: No Way Out	Lee Sang-yong
45	2024	12.12: The Day	Kim Sung-su
46	2025	My Daughter Is a Zombie	Pil Gam-sung

== Discontinued categories ==
Best Foreign Film
#	Year	Film	Director
11	1990	Cinema Paradiso	Giuseppe Tornatore
12	1991	Dances with Wolves	Kevin Costner
13	1992	Les Amants du Pont-Neuf	Leos Carax
14	1993	The Piano	Jane Campion
15	1994	Farewell My Concubine	Chen Kaige
16	1995	The Sacrifice	Andrei Tarkovsky

Best Child Actor or Actress
#	Year	Actor/Actress	Film
3	1965	Kim Yong-yeon	Sad Story of Self Supporting Child
4	1966	Joo Min-ah	DMZ
5	1967	Lee Pung-gu	Seed Money
7	1970	Kim Mi-young	Forgotten Woman
8	1971	Kim Jung-hoon	King Yeong-chin the Last Crown Prince
9	1972	Lee Seung-hyun	Stupid Man

Best Original Song
#	Year	Composer	Film
7	1970	Park Chun-seok	Always a Stranger
8	1971	Baek Young-ho	Mistress
9	1972	Hwang Ha-dong	Leaving in the Rain
10	1973	Hwang Ha-ryong	Life Is on the Lonely Road

Encouragement Award
#	Year	Actor/Actress	Film
5	1967	Ahn In-sook	A Teacher in an Island
9	1972	Yoon So-ra	The Pollen of Flowers
10	1973	Lee Seung-hyun	The Midnight Sun, Sea Walls
10	1973	Yoon Hwa-young	A Special Foreign Legion

Jeong Yeong-il Film Critic Award
#	Year	Recipient
15	1994	Kim Jong-won
16	1995	Byeon In-sik
17	1996	Ahn Byeong-seop
18	1997	Kang Han-seop
19	1998	Lee Young-il
20	1999	Yang Yun-mo
21	2000	Yu Ji-na
22	2001	Park Pyeong-sik (Note: refused the award)

Screenplay Contest
#	Year	Recipient
18	1997	Jeong Jin-wan
18	1997	Lee Jeong-hyang
19	1998	Gu Dong-hoe
19	1998	Kim Byung-jae
20	1999	Kim Seon-mi
20	1999	Hwang Geu-chang

Best Couple Award
#	Year	Actor/Actress	Film
26	2005	Hwang Jung-min and Jeon Do-yeon	You Are My Sunshine
27	2006	Kam Woo-sung and Lee Joon-gi	King and the Clown
29	2008	Kim Joo-hyuk and Son Ye-jin	My Wife Got Married

Lifetime Achievement award
#	Year	Recipient	Film
8	1971	Lee Kyeong-soon	
8	1971	Youngwooheo	
15	1994	Son Jun	
16	1995	Jeon Taek-yi	
17	1996	Han Eun-jin	
18	1997	Jung Il-sung	

Special Achievement Award
#	Year	Recipient	Film
1	1963	Jang Dong-hwi, Choi Moo-ryong, Koo Bong-seo, Lee Dae-yup, Kim Woon-ha	The Marines Who Never Returned
2	1964	Shin Sang-ok	A Tragic Queen Daji
2	1964	Alan Heyman	Hallasan
6	1969	Child actor ensemble cast	School Excursion
10	1973	Ensemble cast	Long Live the Island Frogs
12	1991	Kim Yoo-jin	
13	1992	Kim Min-hyeong	Mister Mamma
13	1992	Hong Kyung-in, Go Jeong-il, Jeong Jin-kang, Moon Hyeok	Our Twisted Hero

Special Posthumous Award
#	Year	Recipient
1	1963	Nam Chun-yeok
29	2008	Choi Jin-sil
30	2009	Jang Jin-young

Grand Prize
#	Year	Recipient	Film
14	1993	Im Kwon-taek	Sopyonje
15	1994	Chung Ji-young	Life and Death of the Hollywood Kid

== Ceremonies ==
Edition	Date
26th Blue Dragon Film Awards	November 29, 2005
27th Blue Dragon Film Awards	December 15, 2006
28th Blue Dragon Film Awards	November 23, 2007
29th Blue Dragon Film Awards	November 20, 2008
30th Blue Dragon Film Awards	December 2, 2009
31st Blue Dragon Film Awards	November 26, 2010
32nd Blue Dragon Film Awards	November 25, 2011
33rd Blue Dragon Film Awards	November 30, 2012
34th Blue Dragon Film Awards	November 22, 2013
35th Blue Dragon Film Awards	December 17, 2014
36th Blue Dragon Film Awards	November 26, 2015
37th Blue Dragon Film Awards	November 25, 2016
38th Blue Dragon Film Awards	November 25, 2017
39th Blue Dragon Film Awards	November 23, 2018
40th Blue Dragon Film Awards	November 21, 2019
41st Blue Dragon Film Awards	February 9, 2020
42nd Blue Dragon Film Awards	November 26, 2021
43rd Blue Dragon Film Awards	November 25, 2022
44th Blue Dragon Film Awards	November 24, 2023
45th Blue Dragon Film Awards	November 29, 2024
46th Blue Dragon Film Awards	November 19, 2025
47th Blue Dragon Film Awards	November 25, 2026

== General references ==
- "Winners and nominees lists". Blue Dragon Film Awards (in Korean). Archived from the original on 27 January 2022.
- "Blue Dragon Film Awards". Naver (in Korean).
