= Lee Soon-jae =

South Korean actor (1934–2025)

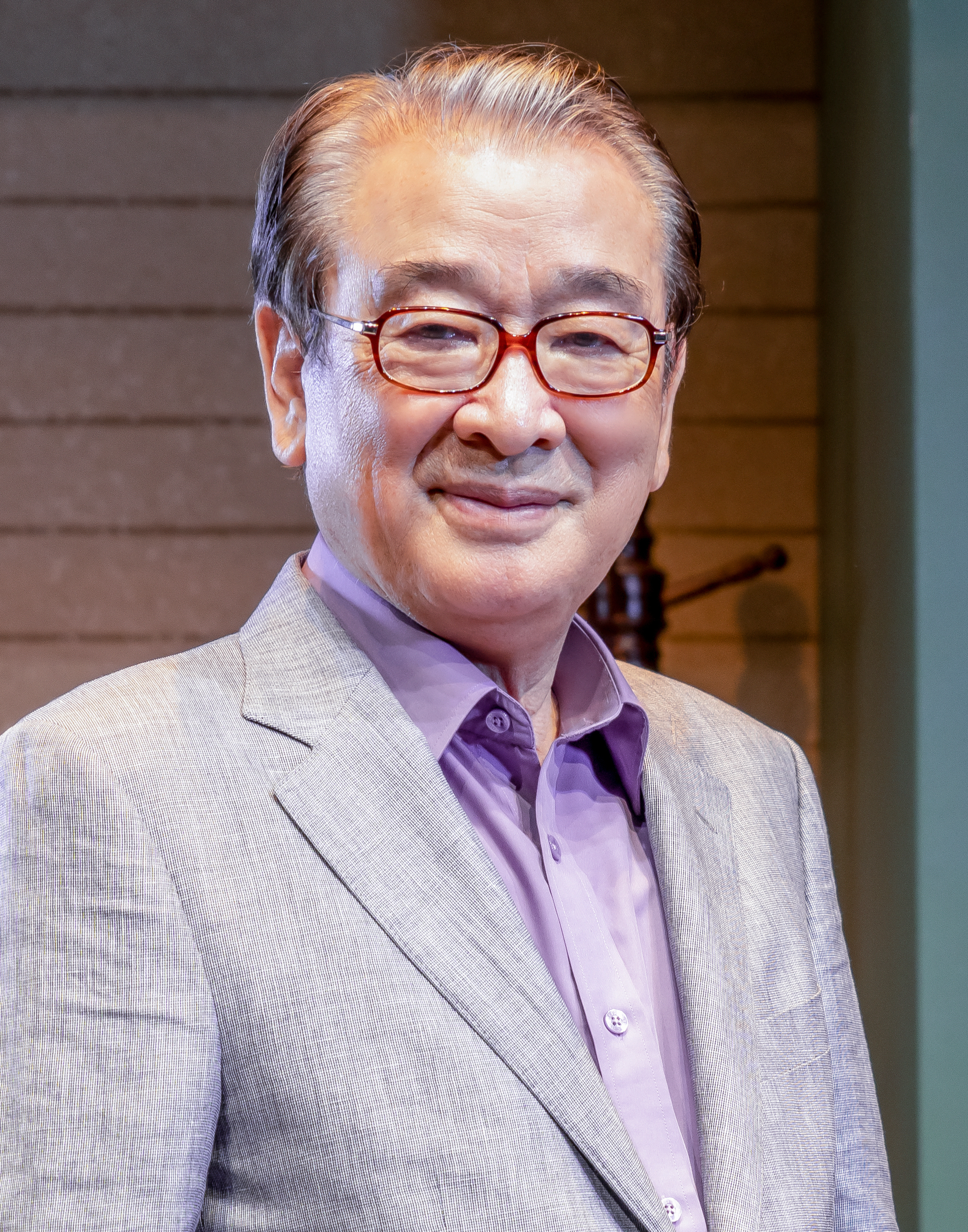
- Lee in 2018
- Born: November 16, 1934 (Note: Lee Soon-jae was born on November 16, 1934, while his registered birth date is October 10, 1935.); Hoeryong, Kankyōhoku Province, Korea, Empire of Japan
- Died: November 25, 2025 (aged 91); Seoul, South Korea
- Education: Seoul National University (BPhil)
- Occupation: Actor
- Years active: 1956–2025
- Spouse: Choi Hee-jung (m. 1966–2025)
- Children: 2
- Honours: Geumgwan Order of Cultural Merit (2025) (Note: Awarded posthumously); Eungwan Order of Cultural Merit (2018); Bogwan Order of Cultural Merit (2004)

Korean name
- Hangul: 이순재
- Hanja: 李順載
- RR: I Sunjae
- MR: I Sunjae

Lee Soon-jae (Korean: 이순재; November 16, 1934 – November 25, 2025) was a South Korean actor. He had a prolific career on the small and big screen spanning over six decades, and was given a second-class Eungwan Order of Cultural Merit for his work as an actor. Lee made his debut on television in 1961 with KBS's first drama Should I become a human too.

== Early life and education ==
Lee was born in Hoeryong, North Hamgyong Province, now part of North Korea, on November 16, 1934. When he was four years old, his family moved to Seoul where Lee's grandparents were living. Lee's grandfather ran a small real estate business, while his father produced and sold soaps. Lee was raised in the neighbourhood of Ahyeon-dong, and graduated from Seoul High School and Seoul National University.

Lee's interest in acting started around the 1950s, when films from various countries came into Korea. He mainly watched Italian, French, and British works; he was especially impressed by Italian films that pursued neo-realism and wished he could act like actors appearing in American works where commercial and artistic aspects coexisted. He was lated impressed by Shakespeare's Hamlet, Richard III, and Romeo and Juliet when he visited England. Lee decided to do acting while in his second year at university. Wanting to go on stage in a play, he went to work every day at the East Salon coffee shop on Myeongdong street, a gathering place for artists and writers led by Lee Hae-rang.

After being discharged from the military, Lee worked as a salaried worker as the head of the broadcasting office, but was convinced that this was not his path. He then asked Lee Hae-rang for one role, and was cast as Mercutio in Romeo and Juliet. His father questioned his decision, thinking it would be too hard and unrewarding, but eventually gave in.

== Career ==
Lee Soon-jae made his debut in 1956 with the play Beyond the Horizon when he was a senior at the Department of Philosophy at Seoul National University. In the 1950s and 1960s he was known, along with other veteran actors like Yeo Woon-kay, as the original stars of daehakgeuk or amateur student theatrical productions. Talking about theater, Lee said:

The stage has simultaneity of action. Filming a movie or drama is no different from the pre-filming process, and the video is cut and edited. However, on stage, the director cannot intervene whether the actors are good or bad, and they have no choice but to rely entirely on the actors. Laurence Olivier said, "Film is the director's art, drama is the writer's art, and theater is the actor's art." Of course, it's not that actors do whatever they want on stage. It follows as suggested by the writer and director, but in the midst of it, there is an independent window for the actor. In a play, the role of an actor is the most important. In that sense, from the actor's point of view, the 'act' of this play is worth doing. Also, there is nothing more rewarding than when we interpret and analyze the works of great masters, deliver their literature and philosophy to the audience, and get a response. So theater is something actors must do.

Lee built a prolific career on the small and big screen spanning nearly six decades. He made his debut on the TV screen in 1961 with KBS's first drama Should I become a human too. He was most active in film in the late 1960s through the 1970s, most notably in Yu Hyun-mok's Bun-rye's Story. As he grew older, Lee shifted to a primarily TV career in the 1990s, receiving acclaim for his roles in the television dramas Live As I Please (written by Yoo Ho), Pungwoon (Crisis), What is Love (written by Kim Soo-hyun) and Hur Jun. He appeared in television series to make a living, but revealed that he was never paid until Death of a Salesman in 1978. In 2007, Lee, by then a distinguished veteran actor, reached new heights of mainstream popularity when he starred in the sitcom Unstoppable High Kick!. One particular scene became a huge hit among young audiences: when his stern grandfather character discovers porn while browsing through a family member's computer files, then embarrassingly gets caught watching. It went viral, giving rise to numerous parodies in which "Yadong (Porn) Soon-jae" is involved in R-rated hijinks. Lee was surprised that even his granddaughter asked for his autograph for her friends, adding, "Even during my best years, my daughter never asked me for that." Despite having no superstars in the cast, the sitcom received high ratings, which Lee attributed to successfully building comic tension. He said, "For an actor to be funny, he's got to play things straight. [...] It's about finding the comedy in something serious." But Lee also lamented the recent trend of casting inexperienced actors in leading roles on TV, saying, "It's important to know the basics, like the language. How can you act, when you don't even know how to pronounce? Acting is not a simple thing, and this I can say from experience." He later returned as the family patriarch in High Kick Through the Roof, which shares the same concept as the previous sitcom, but with a different cast and characters.

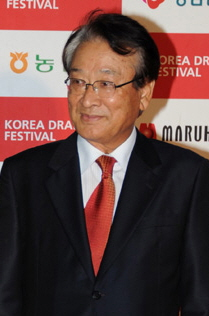
Lee in 2010

In 2009, Lee made his big screen comeback after 20 years in television, in Jang Jin's comedy Good Morning President. The movie tells the story of three fictional Korean presidents, and in the first segment, Lee played a well-respected elderly president nearing the end of his term who espouses frugality and charity, but then agonizes whether to take the money when he unexpectedly wins the lottery. Lee said, "I was impressed with how much times have changed; before it would have been impossible to parody the president. The film tries to show that heads of state are only human, just like you and me, which I think makes the movie distinctive, as well as fresh and fun for viewers."

In 2011, Lee, Yoon So-jung, Song Jae-ho and Kim Soo-mi starred in Late Blossom, a tearjerker romance about two elderly couples, based on the popular webtoon I Love You by Kang Full. Lee said the movie was a rare chance for him and other senior actors to play leading roles on the big screen. He added that Korea's senior citizen population had surpassed five million, and "not understanding their feelings would be a failure of television dramas, movies and even elections. Young people might be under the illusion that life is over after turning 60, but the heart doesn't change despite getting old." Initially difficult to finance due to ageism, Late Blossom had a small shooting and marketing budget compared to most Korean mainstream films. But it became a sleeper hit, recouping four times its cost in just a few weeks. Lee also won Best Actor under the international film category at the China Golden Rooster and Hundred Flowers Film Festival, becoming its oldest recipient. Lee said, "I never thought I'd win. What a surprise. It feels great to know that Late Blossom has been received well overseas. I thought it would be hard for an actor from television dramas to be awarded a prize at film awards, not to mention the unexpected pleasure of winning at a foreign film festival. I have received the best entertainer award and achievement award before, but receiving this makes me happier and more thrilled." It was his first best actor award for a film in 34 years since the 1977 Baeksang Arts Awards.

Lee returned to the stage in 2012 in Father, a Korean adaptation of Arthur Miller's play Death of a Salesman. This was his third time to play the character Willy Loman. Lee said, "When I first played this role in 1978, some parts were rather incomprehensible. But now, as our society developed, we can finally fully understand what those lines mean. That is the beauty of working on masterpieces like Arthur Miller's. I feel a satisfaction and regret at the same time, for I have reached a new comprehension, and for the perspective that I have yet to discover." He reprised the role in 2013, under the direction of Kim Myung-gon.

In 2013, cable channel TVN launched the travel-reality show Grandpas Over Flowers. Defying a youth-centered entertainment industry, the hit show stars four veteran actors in their 70s, Shin Goo, Park Geun-hyung and Baek Il-seob, with their porter Lee Seo-jin as they go on a backpacking tour of France, Taiwan and Spain. The show ended in 2018 after five seasons. In the meantime, Lee joined Idol School as principal and narrator.

In 2018, Lee was awarded a second-class Eungwan Order of Cultural Merit by the Korean government, for his work as an actor. As of 2019, he was the oldest active actor and the oldest actor. Song Hae was the only senior artist among all South Korean celebrities. He was the first to be dedicated to the Korean Broadcasting Hall of Fame and earlier to the MBC Hall of Fame.

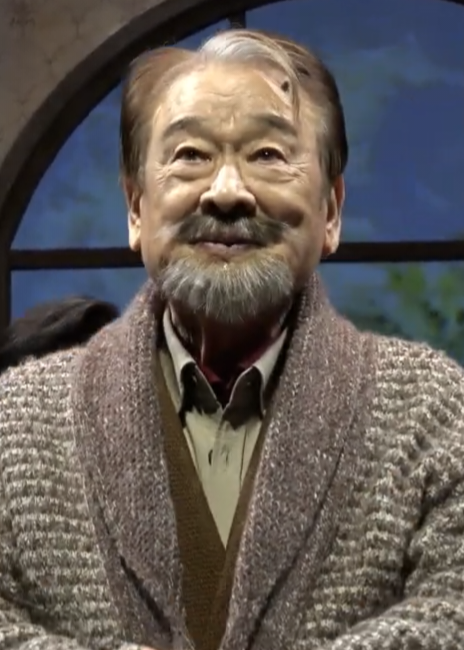
Lee for The Seagull play in 2023

In his final years, Lee remained active in the industry. His television credits included roles in Do Do Sol Sol La La Sol (2020), Again My Life (2022), and Family: The Unbreakable Bond (2023). In 2022, he made his directorial debut with a stage production of Anton Chekhov's The Seagull, and in 2023, he performed the title role in a production of Shakespeare's King Lear. His final television project was the drama Dog Knows Everything (2024) for which he was awarded the Grand Prize (Daesang) at the 2024 KBS Drama Awards and became the oldest recipient (90) of the award in the history of the ceremony. In 2025, he was awarded the Geumgwan Order of Cultural Merit, the highest honor in the South Korean cultural merit system posthumously, in recognition of his contributions to the arts.

== Other ventures ==
From 1992 to 1996, Lee served as a member of the 14th National Assembly of South Korea. He quit politics after one term after finding the political climate "too barren" for his taste. Lee remained active in his various advocacies, such as the Korea Broadcasting Actors Union.

He was also a professor of Film Arts at Sejong University, a professor emeritus of Performing Arts at Gachon University, and the director of the SG Academy.

== Personal life and death ==
Lee first met his wife Choi Hee-jung as a university student as she was the sister of his fellow student theater troupe member. They married in 1966 and had two children.

Lee died in Seoul on November 25, 2025, at the age of 91. His funeral ceremony was held at the Asan Medical Center in Seoul on 27 November, followed by his burial at Eden Paradise in Icheon.

== Filmography ==
=== Television series ===
List of Television series(s)
Year	Title		Role
Year	English	Korean	Role
2024	Dog Knows Everything	개소리	Lee Soon-jae
2023	Family: The Unbreakable Bond	패밀리	Kwon Woong-soo
2022	Behind Every Star	연예인 매니저로 살아남기	Lee Soon-jae
2022	Again My Life	어게인 마이 라이프	Woo Yong-soo
2021	The Red Sleeve	옷소매 붉은 끝동	Special appearances
2020	Do Do Sol Sol La La Sol	도도솔솔라라솔	Kim Man-Dok
2019	Pegasus Market	쌉니다 천리마마트	Kim Dae-ma
2019	Legal High	리갈 하이	Gu Se-jong
2018	Live	라이브	Lee Soon-Jae
2017	Money Flower	돈꽃	Jang Kook-hwan
2016	Dear My Friends	디어 마이 프렌즈	(cameo)
2016	Yeah, That's How It Is	그래, 그런거야	Yoo Jong Chul
2015	The Scholar Who Walks the Night	밤을 걷는 선비	King Hyeonjo
2015	Make a Woman Cry	여자를 울려	Kang Tae-hwan
2015	Unkind Ladies	착하지 않은 여자들	Kim Chul-hee
2014	The King's Face	왕의 얼굴	Baek Kyung
2014	Drama Festival: "Turning Point"	드라마 페스티벌 - 터닝포인트	Lee Soon-jae
2014	Flower Grandpa Investigation Unit	꽃할배 수사대	Lee Joon-hyuk
2013	Potato Star 2013QR3	감자별 2013QR3	Noh Song
2013	Ugly Alert	못난이 주의보	Na Sang-jin
2012	My Kids Give Me a Headache	무자식 상팔자	Ahn Ho-shik
2012	The King's Doctor	마의	Ko Joo-man
2012	Late Blossom	그대를 사랑합니다	Kim Man-seok
2012	The King 2 Hearts	더킹 투하츠	Eun Kyu-tae
2012	Korean Peninsula	한반도	Kang Dae-hyun
2011	A Thousand Kisses	천번의 입맞춤	Jang Byung-doo
2011	The Princess' Man	공주의 남자	Kim Jongseo
2011	My Princess	마이 프린세스	Park Dong-jae
2010	Big Thing	대물	Baek Sung-min
2010	Flames of Desire	욕망의 불꽃	Kim Tae-jin
2010	Coffee House	커피하우스	Seo Eun-young's grandfather
2010	The Miracle of Love	사랑의 기적	cardiologist
2010	Stars Falling from the Sky	별을 따다줘	Jung-gook
2010	Master of Prescriptions	처방의 고수	
2009	Father, Your Place	아버지, 당신의 자리	Lee Sung-bok
2009	High Kick Through the Roof	지붕뚫고 하이킥!	Lee Soon-jae
2009	Children of Heaven	천국의 아이들	
2009	Queen Seondeok	선덕여왕	King Jinheung
2008	Don't Cry My Love	사랑해, 울지마	Han Gyu-il
2008	Beethoven Virus	베토벤 바이러스	Kim Kap-yong
2008	Mom's Dead Upset	엄마가 뿔났다	Na Choong-bok
2007	Lee San, Wind of the Palace	이산	King Yeongjo
2007	Love Isn't Stop: "Ex-lover"	사랑은 쉬지 않는다	Sarangyeot
2007	When Spring Comes	꽃피는 봄이 오면	Lee Jae-shik
2006	High Kick!	거침없이 하이킥!	Lee Soon-jae
2006	The Vineyard Man	포도밭 그 사나이	Lee Byung-dal
2005	A Love to Kill	이 죽일놈의 사랑	
2005	Bride from Hanoi	하노이 신부	Song Il-ran's father
2005	Princess Lulu	루루공주	Chairman Go Deok-soo
2005	HDTV Literature: "The Post Horse Curse"	역마	
2005	My Sweetheart, My Darling	어여쁜 당신	Jang Yoon-jae
2004	Immortal Admiral Yi Sun-sin	불멸의 이순신	Yi Hwang
2004	Toji, the Land	토지	Teacher Kim
2004	The Age of Heroes	영웅시대	Chun Tae-san's grandfather
2004	Hot Tropical Nights in December	12월의 열대야	Dr. Min Tae-joon
2004	Sweet 18	낭랑18세	Kwon Jin-sa
2003	Escape from Unemployment	백수탈출	Hwang Choon-beom
2003	A Problem at My Younger Brother's House	흥부네 박터졌네	Park Man-bo
2003	Pearl Necklace	진주 목걸이	Hwang Man-kap
2003	My Fair Lady	요조숙녀	President
2002	Do You Know The Country?	너희가 나라를 아느냐	Choi Ik-hyun
2002	Jang Hui-bin	장희빈	Song Siyeol
2002	Hyun-jung, I Love You	현정아 사랑해	Kim Jae-hwa
2002	Rustic Period	야인시대	Won Do-in
2002	Who's My Love?	내사랑 누굴까	Kim Deok-bae
2002	Present	선물	
2001	The Merchant	상도 (商道)	Park Joo-myung
2001	Way of Living: Couple	이 부부가 사는 법	Ki In-jong
2001	Guardian Angel	수호천사	Chairman Kang Doo-shik
2001	Orient Theater	동양극장 (東洋劇場)	Wakejima
2001	Still Love	그래도 사랑해	Park Hoe-jang
2000	The Aspen Tree	은사시나무	
2000	Ahjumma	아줌마	Jang Ki-baek
2000	I Want to Keep Seeing You	자꾸만 보고 싶네	Kim Eui-kyung
2000	Mr. Duke	신귀공자	President Jang
1999	Hur Jun	허준	Yoo Ui-tae
1999	The Last War	마지막 전쟁	Han Ji-soo's father
1999	Someone's House	사람의 집	Shim (Joo-sa)
1998	The Solid Man	단단한 놈	National Treasure
1998	I Don't Know Anything But Love	사랑밖엔 난 몰라	
1998	Panther of Kilimanjaro	킬리만자로의 표범	Professor Noh
1998	The Era of the Three Kims	삼김시대	Yun Bo-seon
1998	See and See Again	보고 또 보고	Principal Park
1997	Burnt Railing	불 붙은 난간	Jung Joon
1997	Only You	당신 뿐인데	Heo Jang-gap
1997	Greed	욕망	Song Il-young
1997	Palace of Dreams	꿈의 궁전	Ji Won-ho
1997	Because I Love You	사랑하니까	
1996	Sometimes Like Strangers	때로는 타인처럼	Chairman Park
1996	Wonji-dong Blues	원지동 블루스	Choi Ik-sam
1995	Korea Gate	코리아게이트	Yun Bo-seon
1995	Men of the Bath House	목욕탕집 남자들	Kim Bok-dong
1994	Ambition	야망	Woo Yeok-gwan
1993	The 3rd Republic	제3공화국	Yun Bo-seon
1993	How's Your Husband?	댁의 남편은 어떠십니까?	
1991	Kyoto at 25	교토 25시	Chairman Ishida
1991	What is Love	사랑이 뭐길래	Lee Byung-ho
1991	The Wonders of Eastern Medicine	동의보감	Yoo Ui-tae
1990	Pacheonmu	파천무	Kim Jong-seo
1990	Betrayal of the Rose	배반의 장미	Kim Won-il
1989	Mt. Jiri	지리산	
1989	God's Will	천명	
1989	The 2nd Republic	제2공화국	Yun Bo-seon
1987	Private Song	사모곡	
1986	Your Portrait	그대의 초상	
1985	Silver Rapids	은빛 여울	
1985	An Ardent Desire	열망	Samchonri Industrial founder
1984	My Love is Still Not Over	내 사랑 아직도 끝나지 않았네	
1984	Trees Planted in Winter	겨울에 심은 나무	expert on liberation theology
1984	TV's Tale of Chunhyang	TV 춘향전	
1983	Mom is Busy	엄마는 바빠요	
1982	Mountains and Rivers	산하	
1982	Ordinary People	보통 사람들	
1982	Crisis	풍운	Heungseon Daewongun
1981	A Blessing To Us	우리에게 축복의 기도를	
1981	Campfire	모닥불	
1981	The 1st Republic	제1공화국	Yun Bo-seon
1981	Two Women	두 여인	
1980	Arong and Darong	아롱이 다롱이	
1978	I Miss	그리워	retired principal
1978	Until I Get Married	시집갈때까지는	
1977	It Is	그건 그려	
1976	Cheon Yeo-hwa	천여화	
1975	Mist	안개	
1974	The Men	사나이들	
1974	Phosphorus	인목대비	King Gwanghae
1973	A Road	길	University of Tokyo student Shin Sang-gu
1973	A Second Marriage	재혼	
1973	Softening	연화	Min dae-gam
1972	Official Contact Line	관부연락선	Yoo Tae-rim
1970	Lone Path	고독한 길	
1970	Tokyo International Student	동경유학생	
1970	Daughter	딸	
1970	Madam	아씨	
1970	Ajumma	아줌마	Jang-gu's uncle
1966	Live As I Please	내 멋에 산다	
1966	Mister Bear	미스터 곰	
1964	It's Snowing	눈은 나리는데	
1962	I Want to be a Human, Too	나도 인간이 되련다	

=== Film ===
List of Film(s)
Year	Title		Role	Director
Year	English	Korean	Role	Director
2024	About Family	대가족	The Great Monk	Yang Woo-suk
2022	Good Morning	안녕하세요	In-su	Cha Bong-joo
2020	Mr. Zoo: The Missing VIP	미스터 주: 사라진 VIP	Hamster (voice)	Kim Tae-yoon
2019	Romang	로망	Jo Nam-bong	Lee Chang-geun
2018	Stand By Me	덕구	Grandfather	Bang Soo-in
2011	Romantic Heaven	로맨틱 헤븐	old man (God)	Jang Jin
2011	Late Blossom	그대를 사랑합니다	Kim Man-seok	Choo Chang-min
2009	Good Morning President	굿 모닝 프레지던트	Kim Jeong-ho	Jang Jin
2009	Up	업	Carl Fredericksen (Korean dubbing)	Pete Docter
2006	Family Matters	모두들, 괜찮아요?	Won-jo	Nam Seon-ho
2006	Forbidden Quest	음란서생	Kim Yoon-seo's father	Kim Dae-woo
2005	My Girl and I	파랑주의보	Kim Man-geum	Jeon Yoon-soo
1989	Honeymoon	밀월		Byun Jang-ho
1987	Forget-me-nots	물망초		Lee Mi-rye
1987	0.917 (Subconscious)	영점구일칠 (0.917)		Lee Dong-hui
1986	Wet Grass and Wet Leaves	젖은 풀 젖은 잎		Im Joung-soo
1984	I Want to Go	가고파		Kwak Jeong-hwan
1984	Road to Peace	화평의 길		Kang Dae-jin
1984	Holy Mission			Choe In-hyeon
1983	The Foolish Woman	바보스러운 여자		Ha Hwe-ryong
1983	Love and Farewell	사랑 그리고 이별		Byun Jang-ho
1982	The Blues of Jong-ro	종로 부루스		Kim Hyo-cheon
1981	Forgive Me Once Again Despite Hatred '80'	미워도 다시한번 80 제2부		Byun Jang-ho
1981	Goodbye Daddy '81	아빠안녕		Byun Jang-ho
1980	Son of Man	사람의 아들		Yu Hyun-mok
1980	Mu Hyoup Gum Pung	무협검풍		Nam Gi-nam
1980	The Man to be Forgotten	잊어야 할 그사람		Park Ho-tae
1980	Love Me Once Again Despite Hatred '80	미워도 다시한번 '80		Byun Jang-ho
1980	Magnificent Experience	화려한 경험		Lee Sang-gu
1980	Unconditional Love	아낌없이 바쳤는데		Park Ho-tae
1979	Admiration of Nights	밤의 찬가		Kim Ho-sun
1979	Pyro-Sonata	광염소나타		Go Yeong-nam
1979	Eul-hwa	을화		Byun Jang-ho
1979	Eternal Inheritance	영원한 유산		Choe In-hyeon
1979	The Terms of Love	사랑의 조건		Kim Soo-yong
1979	Miss Oh's Apartment (Sequel)	O양의 아파트(속)		Byun Jang-ho
1979	A Letter from Heaven	하늘나라에서 온 편지		Kim Jun-sik
1978	Miss Oh's Apartment	O양의 아파트		Byun Jang-ho
1978	Red Gate of Tragedy	비련의 홍살문		Byun Jang-ho
1978	Woman in the Fog	안개속의 여인		Choe In-hyeon
1978	Grave Wood	비목		Go Yeong-nam
1978	Sadness Under the Sky	하늘아래 슬픔이		Lee Yeong-woo
1978	With My Older Brother and Sister	오빠하고 누나하고		Lee Sang-eon
1978	King Sejong the Great	세종대왕		Choe In-hyeon
1977	The Old Manor	고가		Cho Moon-jin
1977	Towards the High Place	저 높은 곳을 향하여		Im Won-sik
1977	Little Namgung Dong-ja	남궁동자		Kim Su-hyeong
1977	Arirang-A	아리랑아		Jeong In-yeob
1977	Two Decades as a Woman Journalist	여기자 20년		Kim Soo-yong
1976	I Really Have a Dream	정말 꿈이 있다구		Mun Yeo-song
1976	Concentration of Attention	집념	Heo Jun	Choe In-hyeon
1976	Mother	어머니		Im Won-sik
1976	Season of Love	사랑의 계절		Lee Seong-min
1976	Even I Don't Know My Mind	내마음 나도 몰라		Im Won-sik
1975	You Become a Star, Too	너 또한 별이 되어		Lee Jang-ho
1975	Wasteland	황토		Kim Soo-yong
1975	Yeong-ja's Heydays	영자의 전성시대		Kim Ho-sun
1975	Glory in Ten's	10대의 영광		Go Yeong-nam
1975	Outing in 10 Years	십년만의 외출		Seol Bong
1975	End of an Affair	애종		Jung Jin-woo
1975	Story of the Youth	청춘극장		Byun Jang-ho
1975	Escape	탈출		Go Yeong-nam
1975	Chang-su's Heydays	창수의 전성시대		Kim Sa-gyeom
1975	A Northwest Youth	서북청년		Go Yeong-nam
1974	The Instinct	본능		Kim Soo-yong
1974	A True Story of Kim Du-han	실록 김두한		Kim Hyo-cheon
1974	Pupils of the Evil	악마의 제자들		Lee Seong-gu
1974	The Land	토지		Kim Soo-yong
1974	You and I, and Another	너와 나 그리고 또 하나		Go Yeong-nam
1974	Special Investigation Bureau: The Life of Miss Kim Su-im	특별수사본부 김수임의 일생		Lee Won-se
1974	A Blind Swordsman	죽장검		Shin Young-il
1974	Reminiscences	회상		Go Yeong-nam
1974	A Horrible Breath	공포의 숨소리		Park Tae-won
1974	Lee Jung-seob, a Painter	이중섭		Kwak Jeong-hwan
1974	An Inmate	동거인		Lee Gyeong-tae
1974	Dangerous Relations	위험한 사이		Lee Seong-gu
1974	Yeonhwa 2	연화(속)		Im Kwon-taek
1974	Yeonhwa	연화		Im Kwon-taek
1973	Testimony	증언		Im Kwon-taek
1973	Special Investigation Bureau: Bae Tae-ok Case	특별수사본부 배태옥 사건		Lee Won-se
1972	A Judge's Wife	판사부인		Kang Dae-sun
1972	A Woman in a Mud Flat	갯벌속의 여자		Go Yeong-nam
1972	Girls' High School Days	여고시절		Kang Dae-sun
1972	Two Sons Crying for Their Mother's Love	모정에 우는 두아들		Lee Il-su
1971	My Older Brother (sequel)	형(속)		Lee Doo-yong
1971	Bun-rye's Story	분례기		Yu Hyun-mok
1971	I Want to Be in Your Arms Again	그대 가슴에 다시한번		Kim Sa-gyeom
1971	The First Love	첫정		Jang Yeong-guk
1971	A Family of Brother and Sister	남매는 단둘이다		Moon Sang-hun
1971	Darling, I'm Sorry	아내여 미안하다		Ahn Hyun-chul
1970	Eight Daughters-in-law	팔도며느리		Shim Wu-seob
1970	A Woman's Battleground	여인전장		Shim Wu-seob
1970	Underground Women's College	지하여자대학		Choi Moo-ryong
1970	When We Have Hatred	당신이 미워질때		Kang Dae-jin
1970	Father-in-law	시아버지		Ha Han-soo
1970	If There Were No Parting Again	이별없이 살았으면		Nam Sang-jin
1970	My Life in Your Heart	내 목숨 당신 품에		Jeong Seong-mun
1970	Turtle	거북이		Lee Seong-gu
1970	Please Turn Off the Light	방의 불을 꺼주오		Lee Hyung-pyo
1970	Twisted Fate of a Man	한많은 남아일생		Kim Hyo-cheon
1970	Great King Sejo	세조대왕		Lee Kyu-woong
1970	House of a Stranger	타인의 집		Lee Sang-eon
1969	Evil Person	마인		Im Won-sik
1969	Regret	원		Nam Tae-gwon
1969	Forget-me-not	물망초		Choi Hoon
1969	Invisible Man	투명인간		Lee Kyu-woong
1969	Wound	상처		Choi Moo-ryong
1969	Wild Girl	야성녀		Lee Kyu-woong
1969	Lost Love	어느 하늘아래서		Choi Moo-ryong
1969	Sahwa Mountain	사화산		Go Yeong-nam
1969	Temporary Government in Shanghai	상해 임시정부(와 김구선생)		Jo Keung-ha
1969	Flower Sandals	꽃버선		Jo Keung-ha
1969	For Once in a Lifetime	내 생애에 단한번		Choe In-hyeon
1969	A Returned Singer	돌아온 선창		Chun Jo-myoung
1969	Cruel Revenge	피도 눈물도 없다		Kim Gang-yun
1969	Wind	바람		Go Yeong-nam
1969	7 People in the Cellar	지하실의 7인		Lee Seong-gu
1969	Devoting the Youth	청춘을 다바쳐		Kim Ki-duk
1969	Lady Hong	미녀홍낭자		Kim Ki-young
1969	Brother	형		Lee Sang-eon
1969	Chunwon Lee Gwang-su	춘원 이광수	Yi Gwangsu	Choe In-hyeon
1969	First Night	첫날밤 갑자기		Kim Hyo-cheon
1969	Yun Sim-deok	윤심덕		Ahn Hyun-chul
1969	Jang Nok-su	요화 장록수		Lee Kyu-woong
1969	The Saint and the Witch	성녀와 마녀		Na Han-bong
1969	Escaping Shanghai	상해탈출		Im Kwon-taek
1969	Starting Point	시발점		Kim Soo-yong
1969	Snowy Night	눈나리는 밤		Ha Han-soo
1969	Sky and Star	하늘을 보고 별을 따고		Jo Keung-ha
1968	Quick Ladder of Success	출세가도		Park Jong-ho
1968	Autumn Love	추정		Yu Yeol
1968	Labyrinth	미로		Jung Jin-woo
1968	Daughter	딸		Kim Su-dong
1968	Lady in Dream	몽녀		Im Kwon-taek
1968	Snow Lady	설녀		Kim Ki
1968	Secret Order	밀명		Im Won-sik
1968	Trees Stand on a Slope	나무들 비탈에 서다		Choi Ha-won
1968	Cloud	구름		Jung Jin-woo
1968	Ghost Story	괴담		Chun Jo-myoung
1968	Salt Pond	수전지대		Kim Soo-yong
1968	I Won't Hate You	미워하지 않겠다		Lee Hyung-pyo
1968	The Sister's Diary	언니의 일기		Choe In-hyeon
1968	Love	사랑		Kang Dae-jin
1968	Remarriage	재혼		Go Yeong-nam
1968	A Police Note	형사수첩		Park Jong-ho
1968	A Solar Eclipse	일식		Lee Seong-gu
1968	The Eternal Motherhood			Jo Keung-ha
1968	Pure Love	순정산하		Cho Woong-dae
1968	Sun-deok	순덕이		Choe In-hyeon
1968	Madame Anemone	아네모네 마담		Kim Ki-duk
1968	Trumpet in Night Sky	밤하늘의 트럼펫		Yang Myeong-sik
1968	Romance Mama	로맨스마마		Choe In-hyeon
1968	A Great Hero, Kim Seon-dal	천하호걸 김선달		Im Won-jik
1968	Where is He Now	지금 그 사람은		Choi Hoon
1967	Guests Who Arrived on the Last Train	막차로 온 손님들		Yu Hyun-mok
1967	A King's Command	어명		Gang Jo-won
1967	The Freezing Point	빙점		Kim Soo-yong
1967	Madam of Myeong-wol Kwan	명월관 아씨		Park Jong-ho
1967	Nostalgia	망향천리		Im Kwon-taek
1967	Dongsimcho	동심초		Lee Sang-eon
1967	I Hate Men	남자는 싫어		An Myoun-hee
1967	A Traveling King	나그네 임금		Choe In-hyeon
1967	Whistle	기적		Lee Man-hee
1967	Is Wild Apricot an Apricot?	개살구도 살구냐		Kim Cheol
1967	The Hateful King	상감마마 미워요		Choe In-hyeon
1967	Bobbed Hair	단발머리		Kim Su-dong
1967	Yongary, Monster From The Deep	대괴수 용가리		Kim Ki-duk
1967	When Bucketwheat Flowers Blossom	메밀꽃 필 무렵		Lee Seong-gu
1967	A Regret	한		Yu Hyun-mok
1967	The White Crow	하얀 까마귀		Jung Jin-woo
1967	A Deviation	탈선		Go Yeong-nam
1967	Others	타인들		Kim Ki-duk
1967	A Virtuous Woman	칠부열녀		Choe In-hyeon
1967	Lingering Attachment	미련		Go Yeong-man
1967	The Queen Moonjeong	문정왕후		Rha Bong-han
1967	A Child Who Was Born in the Year of Liberation	해방동이		Park Sang-ho
1967	Traces	이조잔영		Shin Sang-ok
1967	A Misty Grassland	안개낀 초원		Go Yeong-nam
1966	Gunsmoke	초연		Jung Jin-woo
1966	The Dead and the Alive	죽은 자와 산 자		Lee Kang-cheon
1966	I Will Be a King for the Day	오늘은 왕		Kim Ki-duk
1966	The Life of Na Woon-gyu	나운규 일생		Choi Moo-ryong
1966	Terminal	종점		Kim Ki-duk

=== Variety shows ===
Year	Title		Role	Ref.
Year	English	Korean	Role	Ref.
2010	Chronicles – The Legend of 100	연대기 – 100인의 전설	MC	
2013–2015	Grandpas Over Flowers (Season 1 to 5)	꽃보다 할배	Cast Member	
2017	Idol School	아이돌학교	Narrator and Principal	
2021	Granpar	그랜파	Cast Member	
2021	Godfather	갓파더	Main Cast	

== Theater ==
List of Stage Play(s)
Year	Title		Role	Theater	Date	Notes
Year	English	Korean	Role	Theater	Date	Notes
1956	Beyond the Horizon	지평선 너머	—N/a			
1958	Cyrano	씨라노 드 벨쥬락그	Cyrano de Bergerac	National Theater of Korea (Myeongdong)	Jun 20–25	
1960s	The Taming of the Shrew	말괄량이 길들이기	Petruchio	—N/a		
1963	The Matchmaker	결혼중매	August	National Theater of Korea (Myeongdong)	Dec 23-28	
1964	The Martyred	순교자	Captain Park	National Theater of Korea (Myeongdong)	Sep 28–Oct 4	
1965	Look Homeward, Angel	천사여 고향을 돌아보라		National Theater of Korea (Myeongdong)	Nov 30–Dec 3	
1970s	Becket	베케트	—N/a			
1971	Cyrano	시라노	Cyrano de Bergerac	—N/a		
1978	Romeo and Juliet 78	로미오와 쥬리엣 78	Father Lawrence	Sejong Center for the Performing Arts Annex	April 6–10	
1978	Death of a Salesman	세일즈맨의 죽음	Willy Loman	Sejong Center for the Performing Arts Small Auditorium	May 21–28	
1978	Gone with The Wind (Part one)	바람과 함께 사라지다 (제1부)	Gerald O'Hara	Sejong Center for the Performing Arts Auditorium	Nov 16-19	
1979	Male and Female Fantasies	남녀환상곡	Chéjian	Daegu Civic Center Auditorium	Oct 14-15	
1980	Gone with The Wind (Part two)	바람과 함께 사라지다 (제2부)	Gerald O'Hara	Sejong Center for the Performing Arts Auditorium	Apr 18–21	
1982	Padam Padam Padam	빠담 빠담 빠담		Sejong Center for the Performing Arts Auditorium	Feb 19–21	
1982	Crime and Punishment	죄와 벌	Porfiri	Soongeui Music Hall, Seoul	Dec 13–21	
1990s						
2004	Uncle Vanya	바냐 아저씨	Vanya (Kim Tae-hoon)	Byeol Oreum, the National Theater of Korea	September 9	
2006–2007	The Odd Couple	늙은 부부 이야기	Park Dong-man	the 'Small Theater Festival' in Daehangno from the	Dec 29–January 1	
2008	A Life in the Theatre	라이프 인 더 씨어터	Robert	Dongsoong Arts Center Small Theater in Daehangno, Seoul	May 30–August 18	
2010–2011	Don Quixote	돈키호테	Don Quixote	Myeongdong Arts Theater		
2012	Don Quixote	돈키호테	Don Quixote	Myeongdong Arts Theater	January	
2012	Father	아버지	Willy Loman	Cinema Center Sky Yeon Theater	April 6–7	
2012	Father	아버지	Willy Loman	Dongsoong Art Center Dongsoong Hall	April 13–29	
2012	White Neutral Nation	하얀중립국	Priest	Dongduk Women's University Performing Arts Center	August 23–September 1	
2012	Father	아버지	Willy Loman	Lee Haerang Art Theater	September 7–30	
2013	Father	아버지	Willy Loman	GS Caltex Yeulmaru	February	
2013	Father	아버지	Willy Loman	Icheon Art Hall	March	
2013	Father	아버지	Willy Loman	Busan Cinema Center Sky Yeon Theater	April 19–20	
2013	Father	아버지	Willy Loman	Mapo Art Center Art Hall MAC	May 3–19	
2013	Father	아버지	Willy Loman	Wonju Baegun Art Hall	May 25–26	
2013	Father	아버지	Willy Loman	Hanam Culture and Arts Center Grand Theater (Geomdan Hall)	Juni 15	
2013	Sooni's Uncle	순이 삼촌	—N/a	Chungmu Arts Center Medium Theater Black	June 6 to 30	Director
2013	The Crucible	시련	Danfort	Sejong Center for the Performing Arts M Theater	September 5 to 14	Director
2013	Father	아버지	Willy Loman	Hongju Cultural Center	November 23–24	
2014	Theater Heated Battle 5–Love Song	연극열전5 — 사랑별곡	Mr. Park	Dongsoong Art Center Dongsoong Hall	May 2–August 3	
2014	Love Song	사랑별곡	Mr. Park	EXCO Auditorium	August 30–31	
2014	Love Song	사랑별곡	Mr. Park	Incheon Culture & Arts Center Grand Hall	September 13–14	
2014	Love Song	사랑별곡	Mr. Park	Centum City Sohyang Theater Lotte Card Hall Busan	September 20–21	
2014	Love Song	사랑별곡	Mr. Park	Korea Sori Culture Center Moakdang Jeonju	September 27–28	
2014	Love Song	사랑별곡	Mr. Park	Gwangju Culture and Arts Center Grand Theater	October 3–4	
2014	On Golden Pond	황금연못	Norman Thayer	DCF Daemyung Cultural Factory Hall 1 Vivaldi Park Hall	September 19 to November 23	
2014	On Golden Pond	황금연못	Norman Thayer	Jeju Art Center	December 27 to 28	
2015	Yuminga	연극유민가	Un-je	Sogang University Mary Hall	Jan 9-18	
2015	On Golden Pond	황금연못	Norman Thayer	Daegu Culture and Art Center	January 17 to 18	
2015	On Golden Pond	황금연못	Norman Thayer	The Haneul Yeon Theater of the Seoul Cinema Center	January 30 to 31	
2015	On Golden Pond	황금연못	Norman Thayer	Ulsan Culture and Art Center	February 7 to 8	
2015	The Hague 1907	헤이그 1907	—N/a	Dongyang Arts Theater Hall 2 in Daehangno	August 15 to September 6	Director
2015	The Crucible	시련	Danfort	Myeongdong Arts Theater	December 2–28	
2016	Love Song	사랑별곡	Mr. Park	Lee Hae-rang Arts Theater.	September 4	
2016	Let's Follow The Law	법대로 합시다	President of the Republic of Korea (Vincentio in the original novel)	Ewha Girls' High School 100th Anniversary Hwaam Hall	November 2–13	
2016	Death of a Salesman	세일즈맨의 죽음	Willy Loman	Asian Culture Center	December 3–4	
2016	Death of a Salesman	세일즈맨의 죽음	Willy Loman	Arko Arts Theater	December 13–22	
2016	I set the end time and don't postpone it	끝나는 시점을 정해두고 연기하지 않는다	Grandpa	Arko Arts Theater in Daehak-ro, Seoul	December 13–22	
2017	Death of a Salesman	세일즈맨의 죽음	Willy Loman	Daejeon Arts	January 13–14	
2017	Death of a Salesman	세일즈맨의 죽음	Willy Loman	Uijeongbu Arts	February 10–12	
2017	Death of a Salesman	세일즈맨의 죽음	Willy Loman	Suwon SK Atrium	February 17–18	
2017	Death of a Salesman	세일즈맨의 죽음	Willy Loman	Ulsan Culture	February 24–25	
2017	Death of a Salesman	세일즈맨의 죽음	Willy Loman	Gyeongju Arts	February 28–March 1	
2017	Love Song	사랑별곡	Mr. Park	Yegreen Theater	April 28–May 4	
2017	I Love You	사랑해요, 당신	Han Sang-woo	Suseong Artpia	June 17–18	
2017	Love Song	사랑별곡	Mr. Park	Boseong-gun	September 7	
2017	Love Song	사랑별곡	Mr. Park	Changnyeong-gun Culture and Arts Center	September 9	
2017	Love Song	사랑별곡	Mr. Park	Eumseong Culture	September 15	
2017	Jangsu Sanghoe	장수상회	Sung-chil	National Theater of Korea Daloreum Theater	September 15 to October 8	
2017	I Love You	사랑해요, 당신	Han Sang-woo	Yegreen Theater	September 29 to October 29	
2017	Love Song	사랑별곡	Mr. Park	Iksan Arts Center	October	
2017	I Love You	사랑해요, 당신	Han Sang-woo	Anseong Machum	November 18	
2017	I Love You	사랑해요, 당신	Han Sang-woo	Bupyeong Art	Dec 22–24	
2017–2018	The Student and Monsieur Henri	앙리할아버지와 나	Monsieur Henri	Daemyung Cultural Factory Hall 1 Vivaldi Park Hall	Dec 15 to Feb 18	
2018	The Student and Monsieur Henri	앙리할아버지와 나	Monsieur Henri	Uijeongbu Arts Centre	February 23 to 24	
2018	The Student and Monsieur Henri	앙리할아버지와 나	Monsieur Henri	Iksan Arts Center Grand Hall		
2018	The Student and Monsieur Henri	앙리할아버지와 나	Monsieur Henri	Seongnam Art Centre Ensemble Theatre	March 16 to 17	
2018	The Student and Monsieur Henri	앙리할아버지와 나	Monsieur Henri	Gyeongju Arts Center Grand Performance Hall (Gallery Hall)	March 30 to 31	
2018	The Student and Monsieur Henri	앙리할아버지와 나	Monsieur Henri	Ulsan Culture and Arts Centre Small Performance Hall	April 20 to 21	
2018	The Student and Monsieur Henri	앙리할아버지와 나	Monsieur Henri	Daejeon Arts Centre Ensemble Hall	May 4 to 5	
2018	I Love You	사랑해요, 당신	Han Sang-woo	KT&G Sangsangmadang Daechi Art Hall in Gangnam District, Seoul	April 28 to June 3	
2018	The Student and Monsieur Henri	앙리할아버지와 나	Monsieur Henri	Gwacheon Civic Center Small Theater	May 19	
2018	The Student and Monsieur Henri	앙리할아버지와 나	Monsieur Henri	Centum City Sohyang Theatre Shinhan Card Hall	May 26 to 27	
2018	The Student and Monsieur Henri	앙리할아버지와 나	Monsieur Henri	Suwon SK Atrium Grand Performance Hall	June 1 to 2	
2018	Jangsu Sanghoe	장수상회	Sung-chil	Daehangno Uniplex 1	September 7 to October 9	
2018	Song of Love	사랑별곡	Son-jae	Gimpo Art Hall	October 13	
2018	I Love You	사랑해요, 당신	Han Sang-woo	Haeundae Cultural Center Haeun Hall Busan	October 20	
2018	Song of Love	사랑별곡	Son-jae	Jung-gu Cultural Center Incheon	October 26–27	
2018	Collaborators	협력자들	La Grange	Dongguk University Lee Haerang Arts Theater	October 26–November 4	
2018	I Love You	사랑해요, 당신	Han Sang-woo	Busan Cultural Center Central Theater	November 10–11	
2018	Song of Love	사랑별곡	Son-jae	Inje Haneulnaerin Center Grand Hall	November 11	
2018	Jangsu Sanghoe	장수상회	Sung-chil	Iksan Arts Center Grand Hall	November 24 to 25	
2018	Jangsu Sanghoe	장수상회	Sung-chil	Cheongju Arts Center Grand Hall	December 1 to 2	
2018	Jangsu Sanghoe	장수상회	Sung-chil	Daegu EXCO Auditorium	December 15 to 16	
2018	Jangsu Sanghoe	장수상회	Sung-chil	Suwon SK Atrium	December 21 to 22	
2018	Jangsu Sanghoe	장수상회	Sung-chil	Gwangju Culture	December 28 to 29	
2018–2019	I Love You	사랑해요, 당신	Han Sang-woo	Daehangno Art One Theater 1	Dec 6 to Feb 10	
2019	Jangsu Sanghoe	장수상회	Sung-chil	Suncheon Culture	January 26	
2019	Jangsu Sanghoe	장수상회	Sung-chil	Gangneung-Wonju	March 9 to 10	
2019	Jangsu Sanghoe	장수상회	Sung-chil	Bupyeong Arts	March 16 to 17	
2019	I Love You	사랑해요, 당신	Han Sang-woo	Jeju Art Center	March 21–22	
2019	Jangsu Sanghoe	장수상회	Sung-chil	Goyang Oullim Nuri	March 30 to 31	
2019	Jangsu Sanghoe	장수상회	Sung-chil	Gyeongju Arts	April 12 to 13	
2019	Jangsu Sanghoe	장수상회	Sung-chil	Sejong Culture	April 18	
2019	The Student and Monsieur Henri	앙리할아버지와 나	Monsieur Henri	Daehangno Uniplex 1	March 15 to May 12	
2019	I Love You	사랑해요, 당신	Han Sang-woo	Incheon Seo-gu Cultural Center Grand Auditorium.	April 19	
2019	Jangsu Sanghoe	장수상회	Sung-chil	Gumi Culture and	May 17 to 18	
2019	The Student and Monsieur Henri	앙리할아버지와 나	Monsieur Henri	Gunpo Culture &	May 24 to 25	
2019	Jangsu Sanghoe	장수상회	Sung-chil	Gangdong Arts	May 25 to 26	
2019	The Student and Monsieur Henri	앙리할아버지와 나	Monsieur Henri	Gunsan Arts Center	May 31 to June 1	
2019	The Student and Monsieur Henri	앙리할아버지와 나	Monsieur Henri	Suseong Artpia	June 8 to 9	
2019	The Student and Monsieur Henri	앙리할아버지와 나	Monsieur Henri	Cinema Center Sky	June 15 to 16	
2019	The Student and Monsieur Henri	앙리할아버지와 나	Monsieur Henri	Icheon Art Hall	June 20 to 21	
2019	Jangsu Sanghoe	장수상회	Sung-chil	Busan Cultural Center Central Theater	July 5 to 6	
2019	Jangsu Sanghoe	장수상회	Sung-chil	Gwanglim Art Center Jangcheon Hall	August 30 to September 22	
2019	Killing the Dead	망자 죽이기	Pavle	Dongguk University Lee Haerang Arts Theater	Oct 5–31	
2019	Jangsu Sanghoe	장수상회	Sung-chil	Geumnarae Art Hall	November 1–2	
2019	I Love You	사랑해요, 당신	Han Sang-woo	Gimcheon Culture and Arts Center Grand Hall	November 7	
2019	Jangsu Sanghoe	장수상회	Sung-chil	Gyeonggi Culture Center Grand Theater	November 30 to December 1	
2019	Jangsu Sanghoe	장수상회	Sung-chil	Suseong Artpia Paper Hall	December 14	
2019	Jangsu Sanghoe	장수상회	Sung-chil	Gyeongnam Culture and Arts Centre	December 21 to 22.	
2019–2020	I Love You	사랑해요, 당신	Han Sang-woo	Seokyeong University Performing Arts Center Scone Hall 1	November 22 to February 2	
2020	Jangsu Sanghoe	장수상회	Sung-chil	Ulsan	June 7	
2020	Cafe Family	동굴 가족	King	Yegreen Theater	October 15 to 31	
2020	The Student and Monsieur Henri	앙리할아버지와 나	Monsieur Henri	Yeoju	November 13–14	
2020–2021	The Student and Monsieur Henri	앙리할아버지와 나	Monsieur Henri	Yes 24 Stage 1	Dec 3 to Feb 14	
2021	Jangsu Sangho	장수상회	Kim Seong-chil	Seoul Arts Center CJ Towol Theater	March 19–Apr 11	
2021	The Student and Monsieur Henri	앙리할아버지와 나	Monsieur Henri	Gyeonggi Art Centre Small Theatre, Suwon	March 27–28	
2021	I Love You	사랑해요, 당신	Han Sang-woo	Nowon Culture and Arts Center Grand Hall	May 29	
2021	The Student and Monsieur Henri	앙리할아버지와 나	Monsieur Henri	Online	May 30	
2021	I Love You	사랑해요, 당신	Han Sang-woo	Yangsan Culture and Arts Center Grand Hall	June 5	
2021	The Student and Monsieur Henri	앙리할아버지와 나	Monsieur Henri	Online	June 6	
2021	Jangsu Sangho	장수상회	Kim Seong-chil	Gimcheon	August	
2021	I Love You	사랑해요, 당신	Han Sang-woo	Dangjin Culture and Arts Center	September 3	
2021	I Love You	사랑해요, 당신	Han Sang-woo	Changwon 3.15 Art Center	September	
2021	Jangsu Sangho	장수상회	Kim Seong-chil	Yangcheon Cultural	Sep	
2021	Jangsu Sangho	장수상회	Kim Seong-chil	Hanam Culture and	Sep	
2021	Jangsu Sangho	장수상회	Kim Seong-chil	Sohyang Theater	Oct	
2021	Jangsu Sangho	장수상회	Kim Seong-chil	GS Caltex Yeulmaru	Oct	
2021	Jangsu Sangho	장수상회	Kim Seong-chil	Chonbuk National	Oct	
2021	Jangsu Sangho	장수상회	Kim Seong-chil	Ulsan Culture	Oct	
2021	King Lear	리어왕	King Lear	Seoul Arts Center CJ Towol Theater	Oct-Nov 21	
2021	King Lear	리어왕	King Lear	Seoul Arts Center CJ Towol Theater	Nov 24-Dec 5	
2021	Jangsu Sangho	장수상회	Kim Seong-chil	Bucheon Civic	Nov 27–28	
2021	Jangsu Sangho	장수상회	Kim Seong-chil	Yeungnam University	December 25	
2022	Jangsu Sangho	장수상회	Kim Seong-chil	Mokpo Civic	Jan	
2022	Jangsu Sangho	장수상회	Kim Seong-chil	Gwangju Cultural Foundation	April 8–9	
2022	I Love You	사랑해요, 당신	Han Sang-woo	Gwangju Namhansanseong Art Hall	April 8–9	
2022	Jangsu Sangho	장수상회	Kim Seong-chil	Bongsan Cultural Center Gaon Hall, Daegu	April 15–16	
2022	Jangsu Sangho	장수상회	Kim Seong-chil	Dangjin Culture and Arts Center Grand Hall	April 23–24	
2022	Jangsu Sangho	장수상회	Kim Seong-chil	Gamyeong Civic Center 1st Floor Grand Performance Hall	May 6–7	
2022	Jangsu Sangho	장수상회	Kim Seong-chil	Ansan Culture and Arts Center	May 7–8	
2022	Jangsu Sangho	장수상회	Kim Seong-chil	Jeju Art Center	May 14	
2022	Jangsu Sangho	장수상회	Kim Seong-chil	Gimhae Haebu Culture and Arts Center	May 20–21	
2022	Jangsu Sangho	장수상회	Kim Seong-chil	Suwon SK Atrium	May 27–29	
2022	Jangsu Sangho	장수상회	Kim Seong-chil	Grand Theater of the Haenam Culture & Arts Center	June 7–11	
2022	Jangsu Sangho	장수상회	Kim Seong-chil	Grand Hall of the Hyundai Arts Center Ulsan	July 9	
2022	Jangsu Sangho	장수상회	Kim Seong-chil	Yongsan Art Hall	Sep 17-18	
2022	Art	아트	Mark	Yes 24 Stage 1	Sep 17-Dec 11	
2022	Tartuffe, or The Hypocrite	위선자 따르뛰프	NA	Lee Hae-rang Arts Theater	October 15 to 24	Artistik Director
2022	I Love You	사랑해요, 당신	Han Sang-woo	Changnyeong Culture & Arts Center	Nov 11-12	
2022–2023	The Seagull	갈매기	So-rin	Universal Arts Center	Dec 21-Feb 5	director
2023	Art	아트	Mark	Sejong Arts Center Auditorium	Jan 27-28	
2023	The Seagull	갈매기	So-rin	Gyeongju Arts Center	Feb 25	director
2023	Art	아트	Mark	Gunpo Culture and Arts Center Repair Hall	March 4–5	
2023	Art	아트	Mark	Asia Culture Center Arts Theater, Gwangju	March 10–11	
2023	Art	아트	Mark	Andong Culture and Arts Center	March 24–25	
2023	Art	아트	Mark	Daegu Culture and Arts Center Palgong Hall	April 8–9	
2023	Art	아트	Mark	Pyongcheon Art Hall Anyang	March 5	
2023	Jangsu Sanghoe	장수상회	Sung-chil	Doosan Art Center Yonkang Hall	April 21 to May 21	
2023	Jangsu Sanghoe	장수상회	Sung-chil	Grand Theater of the Jeju Culture and Arts Center	July 15	
2023	King Lear	리어왕	King Lear	LG Art Center Seoul	June 1 to 18	
2023	I Love You	사랑해요, 당신	Han Sang-woo	Chungcheongnam-do Cheong Culture and Arts Center	May 19–20	
2023	I Love You	사랑해요, 당신	Han Sang-woo	Chonbuk National University Samsung Cultural Center	October 7	

== Accolades ==
=== Awards and nominations ===
Awards and nominations
Award	Year	Category	Recipient/ Nominated work	Result	Ref.
APAN Star Awards	2012	Achievement Award	High Kick Through the Roof, Good Morning President	Won	
Baeksang Arts Awards	1966	Best Theater Actor	Look Homeward, Angel	Won	
Baeksang Arts Awards	1970	Favorite Reader Award for Theater	Lee Soon-jae	Won	
Baeksang Arts Awards	1971	Favorite Reader Award for Theater	Lee Soon-jae	Won	
Baeksang Arts Awards	1972	Favorite Reader Award for Theater	Lee Soon-jae	Won	
Baeksang Arts Awards	1974	Favorite Reader Award for Theater	Lee Soon-jae	Won	
Baeksang Arts Awards	1977	Best Film Actor	Concentration of Attention	Won	
Baeksang Arts Awards	2009	Achievement Award, TV category	Lee Soon-jae	Won	
Beautiful Artist Awards (Shin Young-kyun Arts and Culture Foundation)	2023	Theatre Artist Award	Lee Soon-jae	Won	
Buil Film Awards	1972	Best Actor	Bun-rye's Story	Won	
China Golden Rooster and Hundred Flowers Film Festival	2011	Best Actor, International Film category	Late Blossom	Won	
Geumgye Baekhwa Film Festival Best Actor Award	2011	Best Actor Award	Late Blossom	Won	
Golden Cinematography Film Festival hosted by Korean Cinematography Association	2019	Acting Achievement Award	Deokgu	Won	
Interpark Golden Ticket Awards (Note: The Golden Ticket Awards (골든티켓어워즈) is an awards ceremony that selects works and people who have shown the best ticket power by performance genre during the year. Since 2005, Interpark has held an awards ceremony by adding up ticket sales, ranking scores, and online voting for each year at the end of the year.)	2015	Best Theater Actor	Love Poem	Won	
Interpark Golden Ticket Awards	2019–2020	Best Theater Actor	Longevity Association, Grandpa Henry and I, I Love You	Won	
Interpark Golden Ticket Awards	2021–2022	Best Theater Actor	King Lear	Won	
Interpark Golden Ticket Awards	2022–2023	Best Theater Actor	Art, Longevity Association	Nominated	
KBS Drama Awards	1984	Excellence Award	겨울에 심은 나무	Won	
KBS Drama Awards	2024	Grand Prize (Daesang) (Note: A Daesang (Korean: 대상), which translates to "Grand Prize", is the highest honor given out at South Korean award ceremonies.)	Dog Knows Everything	Won	
KBS Drama Awards	2024	Best Couple Award (with Yeonwoo and Ari)	Dog Knows Everything	Won	
KBS Drama Awards	2024	Top Excellence Award, Actor	Dog Knows Everything	Nominated	
KBS Drama Awards	2024	Excellence Award, Actor in a Miniseries	Dog Knows Everything	Nominated	
KBS Drama Awards	2024	Popularity Award, Actor	Dog Knows Everything	Nominated	
Korea Best Star Awards	2018	Best Actor	Stand By Me	Won	
Korea Broadcasting Awards	2007	Excellence Award in TV	Unstoppable High Kick!	Won	
Korea Drama Awards	2007	Achievement Award	Unstoppable High Kick!	Won	
Korea Green Foundation	2009	People Who Brightened Our World	High Kick Through the Roof	Won	
Korea PD Awards	2025	Performer Award – Actor	Dog Knows Everything	Won	
Korea Visual Arts Awards	2007	Photogenic Award	Unstoppable High Kick!	Won	
Korean CEO Grand Prix	2011	Special Award, Cultural CEO category	Lee Soon-jae	Won	
Korean Drama and Film Arts Awards	1969	Drama Division's Favorite Readers' Award	Lee Soon-jae	Won	
Korean Drama and Film Arts Awards	1966	Best Acting Award in Theater	Look Homeward, Angel	Won	
Korean Drama and Film Arts Awards	1970	Favorite Readers' Award in theatre	Lee Soon-jae	Won	
Korean Drama and Film Arts Awards	1971	Favorite Readers' Award in theatre	Lee Soon-jae	Won	
Korean Drama and Film Arts Awards	1972	Favorite Readers' Award in theatre	Lee Soon-jae	Won	
Korean Drama and Film Arts Awards	1974	Favorite Readers' Award in theatre	Lee Soon-jae	Won	
Korean Drama and Film Arts Awards	1977	Best Actor Award	Obsession	Won	
MBC Drama Awards	2008	PD Award	Beethoven Virus	Won	
MBC Drama Awards	2007	Golden Acting Award, Actor in a Historical Drama	Lee San, Wind of the Palace	Won	
MBC Entertainment Awards	2008	Grand Prize (Daesang)	Unstoppable High Kick!	Won	
MBC Entertainment Awards	2009	Achievement Award	High Kick Through the Roof	Won	
MBC Hall of Fame	2002	Hall of Fame	Lee Soon-jae	Won	
Mnet 20's Choice Awards	2007	Best Casting	Unstoppable High Kick!	Won	
New Film Arts Film Festival Middle hosted by Director Shin Sang-ok's Commemorative Business Association	2019	Actor Award	Romance	Won	
Person Award	2007	Popular Artist Award	Lee Soon-jae	Won	
SBS Drama Awards	2000	Achievement Award	Silver Aspen	Won	
SBS Drama Awards	2004	Excellence Award, Actor in a Serial Drama	Toji, the Land	Won	
Scene Stealer Festival	2023	Lifetime Achievement Award	Lee Soon-jae	Won	
Seoul Art & Culture Awards	2010	Grand Prize (Daesang) Cultural Artist category	Lee Soon-jae	Won	
TBC Drama Awards	1974	Grand Prize (Daesang)	연화, 사나이들	Won	
TBC Drama Awards	1979	Distinguished Service Award	Lee Soon-jae	Won	

=== State honors ===
List of State honour(s)
State	Award Ceremony	Year	Honor	Ref.
South Korea	Awarded posthumously	2025	Geumgwan Order of Cultural Merit (1st class)	
South Korea	Cultural Day (문화의 날)	2004	Bogwan Order of Cultural Merit (3rd Class)	
South Korea	Korean Popular Culture and Arts Awards (Note: Since 2010 Honors are given at the Korean Popular Culture and Arts Awards, arranged by the Korea Creative Content Agency and hosted by the Ministry of Culture, Sports and Tourism.)	2018	Eungwan Order of Cultural Merit (2nd Class)	
South Korea	Tax Payer's Day	2007	Citation given by the Dongdaemun District Tax Office	

=== Listicles ===
Name of publisher, year listed, name of listicle, and placement
Publisher	Year	Listicle	Placement	Ref.
Forbes	2010	Korea Power Celebrity 40	32nd	
KBS	2023	The 50 people who made KBS shine	41st	
Korean Film Council	2021	Korean Actors 200 (Note: Introduces 200 actors that best represent the present and future of Korean cinema to the people in the film industry all over the world.)	Included	
Sisa Journal (Note: Sisa Journal Next Generation Leader-Society was founded by Sisa Journal in 2008.)	2019	Most Influential Person in Broadcasting & Entertainment	20th	

== Election results ==
Year	Elections	Constituency	Political party	Votes (%)	Results
1988	13th National Assembly General Election	Jungnang A (Seoul)	DJP	26,483 (31.40%)	Defeated (2nd)
1992	14th National Assembly General Election	Jungnang A (Seoul)	DLP	46,297 (48.71%)	Won
