= Yoon Jeong-hee =

South Korean actress (1944–2023)

- Portrait of Yoon
- Born: Son Mi-ja; July 30, 1944; Busan, Korea, Empire of Japan
- Died: January 19, 2023 (aged 78); Paris, France
- Occupation: Actress
- Years active: 1967–2010
- Spouse: Kun-Woo Paik (m. 1974)

Korean name
- Hangul: 손미자
- Hanja: 孫美子
- RR: Son Mija
- MR: Son Mija

Stage name
- Hangul: 윤정희
- Hanja: 尹靜姬
- RR: Yun Jeonghui
- MR: Yun Chŏnghŭi

Yoon Jeong-hee (Korean: 윤정희; July 30, 1944 – January 19, 2023) was a South Korean actress and beauty pageant titleholder who competed at Miss Korea 1963. She debuted in 1967 in Theatre of Youth. She appeared in about 330 films, and her better known works are New Place (1979), Woman in Crisis (1987) and Manmubang (1994). Her last performance was in 2010, in director Lee Chang-dong's film Poetry, for which she won 7 best actress awards including Asia Pacific Screen Award for Best Actress at 4th Asia Pacific Screen Awards, the Grand Bell Award at 47th Grand Bell Awards, and Los Angeles Film Critics Association Award at 2011 Los Angeles Film Critics Association Awards.

== Career ==
Yoon was born in Busan, Korea and debuted as an actress in 1967 by starring in Cheongchun Geukjang directed by Gang Dae-jin after being chosen in a recruit held by Hapdong Film. Yoon was commonly referred to as one of the "Troika" (three) of the 1960s, along with her rival actresses, Moon Hee and Nam Jeong-im.

She came out of retirement in 2010 to star in Lee Chang-dong's film, Poetry, which won her the Los Angeles Film Critics Association Award for Best Actress and the Asia Pacific Screen Award for Best Performance by an Actress.

== Personal life and death ==
Yoon married noted pianist Kun-Woo Paik in 1974. The couple had a daughter who is a violinist. Yoon resided in Paris, France with her family since her retirement in the mid-1990s, until making her comeback in Lee Chang-dong's Poetry.

Throughout her life, Yoon was a devout Roman Catholic, having been baptized in her junior high school years.

Yoon, who suffered from Alzheimer's disease, died on January 19, 2023, in Paris. She was 78.

== Filmography ==
*Note; the whole list is referenced.

English title	Korean title	Romanization	Year	Role	Director
Poetry	시	Si	2010	Mi-ja	Lee Chang-dong
Manmubang	만무방	Manmubang	1994		
Flower in Snow	눈꽃	Nunkkot	1992		
The Isle of Shiro	시로의 섬	Siro-ui seom	1988		
A Woman on the Verge	위기의 여자	Wigi-ui yeoja	1987		
The Chrysanthemum and the Clown	삐에로와 국화	Ppierowa gukhwa	1982		
Bird That Cries At Night	저녁에 우는 새	Jeonyeok-e wuneun sae	1982		
Liberal Wife '81	자유부인 '81	Ja-yubu-in '81	1981		
The Terms of Love	사랑의 조건	Sarang-ui jogeon	1979		
The Loneliness of the Journey	여수	Yeosu	1978		
Flowers and Birds	화조	Hwajo	1978		
A Splendid Outing	화려한 외출	Hwaryeohan oechul	1977		
Night Journey	야행	Yahaeng	1977		
The Tae-Baeks	태백산맥	Taebaegsanmaeg(Taebaeksanmaek)	1975		
Truth of Tomorrow	내일은 진실	Nae-il-eun jinsil	1975		
Bird of Paradise	극락조	Geuglagjo	1975		
Woman Like A Crane	학녀	Hagnyeo	1975		
Ecstasy	황홀	Hwanghol	1974		
A Flowery Bier	꽃상여	Kkotsang-yeo	1974		
Azaleas in My Home	고향에 진달래	Gohyang-e jindallae	1973		
Love Class	애인교실	Ae-ingyosil	1973		
Special Investigation Bureau: Kim So-San, the Kisaeng	특별수사본부 기생 김소산	Teugbyeolsusabonbu gisaeng Gim Sosan	1973		
A Wrecked Fishing Boat	난파선	Nanpaseon	1973		
The Military Academy	육군사관학교	Yuggunsagwanhaggyo	1973		
The Three-Day Reign	삼일천하	Samil cheonha	1973		
During Mother's Lifetime	어머님 생전에	Eomeonim saengjeon-e	1973		
Tto Sun Yi, A College Girl	여대생 또순이	Yeodaesaeng Ttosuni	1973		
A Field Full of Happiness	행복이 쏟아지는 벌판	Haengbogi ssodajineun beolpan	1973		
20 Years After The Independence and Baek Beom Kim Ku	광복 20년과 백범 김구	Gwangbog 20nyeongwa Baekbeom Gim Gu	1973		
A Cafe of September	9월의 찻집	9wol-ui chatjib	1973		
Sister	누나	Nuna	1973		
Don't Forget Love, Though We Say Goodbye	헤어져도 사랑만은	He-eojyeodo sarangmaneun	1972		
When A Little Dream Blooms...	작은 꿈이 꽃필 때	Jag-eun kkum-i kkochpil ttae	1972		
Looking for Sons and Daughters	아들 딸 찾아 천리길	Adeul ttal chaja cheonligil	1972		
Gab Sun Yi, the Best driver	모범 운전수 갑순이	Mobeom-unjeonsu Gapsuni	1972		
One Who Comes Back and The Other Who Has To Leave	돌아온 자와 떠나야 할 자	Dol-a-on ja-wa tteona-ya hal ja	1972		
Mother, Why Did You Give Birth to Me?	어머니 왜 나를 낳으셨나요	Eomeoni wae naleul nah-eusyeossna-yo	1972		
Ever Smiling Mr. Park	웃고 사는 박서방	Utgo saneun Bakseobang	1972		
Oyster Village	석화촌	Seokhwachon	1972		
Sim Cheong	효녀 청이	Hyonyeo Cheong-i	1972		
Our Land of Korea	우리의 팔도강산	Uri-ui paldogangsan	1972		
Hatred Becomes....	미움이 변하여	Miumi byeonhayeo	1972		
A Shaman's Story	무녀도	Munyeodo	1972		
Voices	목소리	Moksori	1972		
Daughter-In-Law	며느리	Myeoneuri	1972		
A Crossroad	기로	Giro	1972		
Oh, Frailty	약한 자여	Yakhanja-yeo	1972		
A Ghost Affair	유령 소동	Yuryeong sodong	1972		
The Partner	동업자	Dongeobja	1972		
Don't Go	가지마오	Gajima-o	1972		
Drum Sound of Sae Nam Teo	새남터의 북소리	Saenamteo-ui buksori	1972		
The Fugitive in the Storm	폭우 속의 도망자	Pogu sogui domangja	1972		
Kneel Down and Pray	무플 꿇고 빌련다	Mureup kkulko billyeonda	1972		
Cruel History of Myeong Dong	명동 잔혹사	Myeongdong janhoksa	1972		
On a Star Shining Night	별이 빛나는 밤에	Byeol-i bichnaneun bam-e	1972		
Where Should I Go?	어디로 가야하나	Eodiro gayahana	1972		
30 Years of Love	유정 30년	Yujeongsamsibnyeon	1972		
Courtesan	궁녀	Gungnyeo	1972		
A Family Tree	족보	Jokbo	1971		
To Love and To Die	사랑할 때와 죽을 때	Salanghal ttae-wa jug-eul ttae	1971		
Bye, Mom	엄마 안녕	Eomma annyeong	1971		
Sorrow in Tears	두 줄기 눈물 속에	Du julgi nunmulsog-e	1971		
Twelve Women	열두 여인	Yeoldu yeoin	1971		
Brother and Sister in the Rain	비에 젖은 남매	Bi-e jeoj-eun du nammae	1971		
I Can't Forget You	간다고 잊을소냐	Gandago ij-eulsonya	1971		
Seven Jolly Sisters	유쾌한 딸 7형제	Yukwaehan ttal 7hyeongje	1971		
Tragic Death of Ambition	쌍벌한	Ssangbeolhan	1971		
The Last Marine in Vietnam	성난 해병열사대	Seongnan haebyeonggyeolsadae	1971		
Time on Myungdong	명동에 흐르는 세월	Myeongdong-e heureuneun se-wol	1971		
A Woman Gambler	어느 여도박사	Eoneu yeodobagsa	1971		
Two Women Ridden With Han	한많은 두 여인	Hanmanh-eun du yeo-in	1971		
New Year's Soup	떡국	Tteokguk	1971		
My Love, My Foe	현상불은 4인의 악녀	Hyeonsangbuteun 4in-ui agnyeo	1971		
Tomorrow's Scenery of Korea	내일의 팔도강산	episode 3, "Nae-il-ui paldogangsan"	1971		
Happy Farewell	행복한 이별	Hangbokhan ibyeol	1971		
A Sworn Brother	의형	Uihyeong	1971		
His Double Life	미스 리	Miss Lee	1971		
East and West	동과 서	Donggwa seo	1971		
The Golden Harbor in Horror	공포의 황금부두	Gongpo-ui hwanggeumbudu	1971		
Sergeant Kim's Return From Vietnam	월남에서 돌아온 김상사	Wolnam-eseo dol-a-on Gimsangsa	1971		
Bun-Rye's Story	분례기	Bunlyegi	1971		
A Hotel Room	여창	Yeochang	1971		
Two Weeping Women	흐느끼는 두 여인	Heuneukkineun du yeo-in	1971		
My Father	친정 아버지	Chinjeong-abeoji	1971		
Light in the Field	초원의 빛	Cho-won-ui bit	1971		
What Happened That Night	그날밤 생긴 일	Geunalbam saenggin il	1971		
Two Guys	두 남자	Du namja	1971		
A Family of Brother and Sister	남매는 단 둘이다	Nammaeneun dandul-ida	1971		
Impetuous Mother-in-law	괴짜 부인	Goejja buin	1971		
Between You and Me	당신과 나 사이에	Dangsingwa na sa-i-e	1971		
Best of Them All	최고로 멋진 남자	Choegoro meotjin namja	1971		
Gapsun-i	갑순이	Gapsun-i	1971		
Woman in a Red Mask	빨간 마스크의 여인	Ppalgan maseukeu-ui yeo-in	1971		
Why Do You Abandon Me	나를 버리시나이까	Nareul beorisinaikka	1971		
Two Sons	두 아들	sequel, "Du adeul"	1971		
My Wife	내 아내여	Nae anae-yeo	1971		
Two Daughters	두 딸	Du ttal	1971		
A Woman Who Came in Straw Sandals	짚세기 신고 왔네	jipsegi singo watne	1971		
Madame Mist	안개 부인	Angae buin	1971		
A Guilty Woman	죄많은 여인	Joemanh-eun yeo-in	1971		
Not a Good Wife	처복	Cheobok	1971		
Leaving in the Rain	비 속에 떠날 사람	Bissog-e tteonal salam	1971		
Mothers of Two Daughters	두 딸의 어머니	Du ttal-ui eomeoni	1971		
Saturday Afternoon	토요일 오후	To-yo-il-ohu	1971		
The Last Flight to Pyongyang	평양 폭격대	Pyeong-yang poggyeokdae	1971		
The Women of Kyeongbokgung	경복궁의 여인들	Gyeongboggungui yeoindeul	1971		
Today's Men	현대인	Hyeondaein	1971		
Big Brother's Marriage	결혼 대작전	Gyeorhon daejakjeon	1970		
Tears of an Angel	천사의 눈물	Cheonsa-ui nunmul	1970		
We Wish You a Long Life, Mom and Dad!	엄마 아빠 오래 사세요	Eomma appa orae saseyo	1970		
A Queen of Misfortune	비운의 왕비	Bi-un-ui wangbi	1970		
A Woman Who Came a Long Way	먼데서 온 여자	Meondeseo on yeoja	1970		
Separation at the Station	이별의 15 열차	Ibyeol-ui sib-o-yeolcha	1970		
My Life in Your Heart	내 목숨 당신 품에	Nae mogsum dangsin pum-e	1970		
An Idiot Judge	호피 판사	Hopi pansa	1970		
Escape in the Mist	안개 속의 탈출	Angae sogui talchul	1970		
Twisted Fate of Man	한많은 남아일생	Hanmanheun nama ilsaeng	1970		
Escape	삼호탈출	Samhotalchul	1970		
Marriage Classroom	결혼 교실	Gyeorhon gyosil	1970		
Affair on the Beach	해변의 정사	Haebyeon-ui jeongsa	1970		
Golden Operation 70 in Hong Kong	황금 70 홍콩 작전	Hwanggeum70 Hong Kong jakjeon	1970		
Man of Desires	욕망의 사나이	Yogmang-ui sanai	1970		
A Woman's Battleground	여인 전장	Yeoin jeonjang	1970		
Old Gentleman in Myeongdong	명동 노신사	Myeongdong nosinsa	1970		
The Woman Who Grabbed the Tiger's Tail	호랑이 꼬리를 잡은 여자	Horangi kkorireul jabeun yeoja	1970		
Chase That Woman	그 여자를 쫓아라	Geu yeojareul jjochara	1970		
Angel, Put Your Clothes On	천사여 옷을 입어라	Cheonsayeo oseul ibeora	1970		
If He Were the Father	그 분이 아빠라면	Geu bun-i apparamyeon	1970		
Between My Father's Arms	아빠 품에	Appa pum-e	1970		
An Abandoned Woman	버림 받은 여자	Beorim badeun yeoja	1970		
The Woman Who Wanted an Apartment	아파트를 갖고 싶은 여자	Apateureul gatgo sipeun yeoja	1970		
Sunday Night and Monday Morning	일요일 밤과 월요일 아침	Il-yo-il bamgwa wol-yo-il achim	1970		
A Wild Girl	별명 붙은 여자	sequel, "Byeolmyeong buteun yeoja"	1970		
Yearning for a Lover	임 그리워	Im geuriwo	1970		
The Havelin Killer in the Wild	광야의 표창잡이	Gwangya-ui pyochangjabi	1970		
Turtle	거북이	Geobugi	1970		
Chastity	순결	Sungyeol	1970		
Answer My Question	대답해 주세요	Daedabhae juseyo	1970		
Thy Name Is Woman	당신은 여자	Dangsin-eun yeoja	1970		
Rain Outside the Porthole	비나리는 선창가	Binarineun seonchangga	1970		
Because You Are a Woman	여자이기 때문에	Yeoja-igi ttaemun-e	1970		
Oh! My Love	아! 임아	A! Im-a	1970		
Two Women in the Rain	비에 젖은 두 여인	Bi-e jeoj-eun du yeo-in	1970		
Why She Doesn't Marry	누야 와 시집 안 가노	Nuya wa sijib-angano	1970		
Lonely Father	기러기 아빠	Gireogi appa	1970		
Cutest of them All	최고로 멋진 남자	Choegoro meotjin namja	1970		
First Experience	첫경험	Cheotgyeongheom	1970		
Regret	원	Won	1969		
Six Shadows	여섯 개의 그림자	Yeoseotgae-ui Geurimja	1969		
Darling	당신	Dangsin	1969		
If We Didn't Meet	만나지 않았다면	Mannaji Anatdamyeon	1969		
I Like It Hot	뜨거워서 좋아요	Ddeugeoweoseo Joayo	1969		
A Wonderer in Myeong-dong	명동 나그네	Myeong-dong Nageune	1969		
Blues at Midnight	0시의 부르스	Yeongsi-ui bureuseu	1969		
Under the Roof	어느 지붕 밑에서	Eoneu Jibung Miteseo	1969		
A Left-hander in Tokyo	동경의 왼손잡이	Donggyeon-ui Oensonjabi	1969		
I Love You	사랑하고 있어요	Saranghago Isseoyo	1969		
7 People in the Cellar	지하실의 7인	Jihasil-ui Chil-in	1969		
Love and Hate	사랑이 미워질 때	Sarang-i Miweojil ddae	1969		
One Step in the Hell	한발은 지옥세	Hanbareun Jioge	1969		
Parking Lot	주차장	Juchajang	1969		
Friend's Husband	한번 준 마음인데	Hanbeon Jun Maeuminde	1969		
Housekeeper's Legacy	식모의 유산	Singmo-ui Yusan	1969		
Women of Yi-Dynasty	이조 여인 잔혹사	Ijo Yeoin Janhogsa	1969		
The Magical Ship	마법선	Mabeopseon	1969		
Forget-me-not	물망초	Mulmangcho	1969		
Calm Life	조용히 살고 싶어요	Joyonghi Salgo Sipeo	1969		
Yeojin Tribe	여진족	Yeojinjog	1969		
Day Dream	장한몽	Janghanmong	1969		
Until That Day	늦어도 그날까지	Neujeodo Geunalkkaji	1969		
Girl of Heuksan Island	흑산도 아가씨	Heuksando Agassi	1969		
Embrace	포옹	Po-ong	1969		
Gallant Man	팔도 사나이	Paldo Sanai	1969		
Reminiscence	추억	Chu-eok	1969		
Youth	청춘	Cheongchun	1969		
First Night	첫날밤 갑자기	Cheonnalbam Gabjagi	1969		
Window	창	Chang	1969		
The 4th Man	제4의 사나이	Je4ui Sanai	1969		
Destiny of My Lord	전하 어디로 가시나이까	Jeonha Eodiro Gasinaikka	1969		
Deer in the Snow Field	저 눈밭에 사슴이	Jeo Nunbat-e Saseumi	1969		
Castle of Rose	장미의 성	Jangmi-ui Seong	1969		
Woman Captain	여선장	Yeoseonjang	1969		
Foggy Shanghai	안개낀 상해	Angaekkin Sanghae	1969		
The Past	세월이 흘러가면	Sewori Heulleogamyeon	1969		
The Three Female Swordsmen	3인의 여검객	Samin-ui Yeogeomgaek	1969		
An Old Potter	독 짓는 늙은이	Dok Jinneun Neulgeuni	1969		
Jin and Min	죽어도 좋아	Jug-eodo Joa	1969		
Condemned Criminals	5인의 사형수	O-in-ui Sahyeongsu	1969		
Immortal Rivers and Mountains	만고강산	Mangogangsan	1969		
A Nicknamed Woman	별명 붙은 여자	Byeolmyeong Buteun Yeoja	1969		
Love is the Seed of Tears	사랑은 눈문의 씨앗	Sarang-eun Nunmul-ui Ssi-at	1969		
Devoting the Youth	청춘을 다 바쳐	Cheongchun-eul Da bachyeo	1969		
A Native of Myeong-dong	명동 출신	Myeong-dong Chulsin	1969		
Temptation	유혹	Yuhok	1969		
In Your Arms	죽어도 그대 품에	Jug-eodo Geudae Pume	1969		
The Geisha of Korea	팔도 기생	Paldo Gisaeng	1968		
Hard to Forget	잊으려 해도	Ijeuryeo haedo	1968		
Trumpet in Night Sky	밤 하늘의 트럼펫	Bamhaneurui Treompet	1968		
Dangerous Blues	살인 부르스	Sarin Bureus	1968		
Blues of the Twilight	황혼의 부르스	Hwanghon-ui Bureuseu	1968		
Beautiful Land	금수강산	GeumsuGangsan	1968		
Blue Writings of Farewell	파란 이별의 글씨	Paran Ibyeorui Geulssi	1968		
Sunset	낙조	Nakjo	1968		
Women's Quarter	규방	Gyubang	1968		
Winds and Clouds	풍운 - 임란야화	Pung-un; Imran Yahwa	1968		
The Crossroads of Hell	지옥의 십자로	Jiogui Sipjaro	1968		
Sobbing Swan	흐느끼는 백조	Heuneukkineun Baekjo	1968		
The General's Mustache	장순의 수염	Janggun-ui Suyeom	1968		
Crossed Love	엄마야 누나야 강변 살자	Eommaya Nunaya Gangbyeon Salja	1968		
Mother is Strong	어머니는 강하다	Eomonineun ganghada	1968		
Chorus of Trees	가로수의 합창	Garosu-ui Hapchang	1968		
Nightmare	악몽	Angmong	1968		
Correspondent in Tokyo	동경 특파원	Donggyeong Teugpawon	1968		
Potato	감자	Gamja	1968		
A Journey	여로	Yeoro	1968		
Goodbye Dad	아빠 안녕	Abba An-nyeong	1968		
Sorrow Over the Waves	슬픈 파도를 넘어	Seulpeumeun Padoreul Neomeo	1968		
Dreams of Sora	소라의 꿈	Soraui Ggum	1968		
Enraged Land	성난 대지	Seongnan Daeji	1968		
Snow Lady	설녀	Seolnyeo	1968		
Scared of Night	밤은 무서워	Bameun Museoweo	1968		
Eunuch	내시	Naesi	1968		
Warm Wind	난풍	Nanpung	1968		
A Young Gisaeng	화초 기생	Hwacho Gisaeng	1968		
Grudge	한	Han	1968		
A Man of Windstorm	폭풍의 사나이	Pokpung-ui Sanai	1968		
Three Thousand Miles of Legend	전설따라 삼천리	Jeonseol-ddara Samcheonri	1968		
Hard to Forget	잊으려 해도	Ijeuryeo haedo	1968		
A Japanese	일본인	Ilbonin	1968		
Jade Binyeo	옥비녀	Ok Binyeo	1968		
Yeong	영	Yeong	1968		
A Devoted Love	순애보	Sunaebo	1968		
Glory of Barefoot	맨방의 영광	Maenbarui Yeonggwang	1968		
Pure Love	순정	Sunjeong	1968		
A Cliff	절벽	Jeolbyeok	1968		
Shining Sadness	찬란한 슬픔	Chanranhan Seulpeum	1968		
Students of Karl Marx	칼 맑스의 제자들	Karl Marx-ui Jejadeul	1968		
Bell Daegam	방울 대감	Bang-ul Daegam	1968		
Kisaeng	단발 기생	Danbal Gisaeng	1968		
Secret of Motherly Love	모정의 비밀	Mojeongui Bimil	1968		
Great Swordsman	대검객	Daegeomgaek	1968		
Lonely Marriage Night	독수공방	Doksugongbang	1968		
Snowstorm	눈보라	Nunbora	1968		
The Sorrow of Separation	이수	Isu	1968		
A Man of Great Strength: Im Ggyeok-jeong	천하장사, 임꺽정	Cheonha Jangsa, Im Ggyeok-jeong	1968		
The Third Class Inn	삼등 여관	Samdeung Yeogwan	1967		
Longing in Every Heart	그리움은 가슴마다	Geuriumeun Gaseummada	1967		
A Secret Royal Inspector	암행어사	Amhaeng-eosa	1967		
Gang Myeong-hwa	강명화	Gang Myeong-hwa	1967		
The First Night	초야	Choya	1967		
Legend of Ssarigol	싸리골 신화	Ssarigorui Sinhwa	1967		
A Miracle of Gratitude	보은의 기적	Bo-eunui Gijeok	1967		
Dolmuji	돌무지	Dolmuji	1967		
I Live as I Please	내 멋에 산다	Nae Meose Sanda	1967		
Is Wild Apricot an Apricot?	개살구도 살구냐	Gaesalgudo Salgunya	1967		
Mist	안개	Angae	1967		
I Am Not Lonely	외롭지 않다	Oeropji Anta	1967		
Sorrowful Youth	청춘 극장	Cheongchun Geukjang	1967		
Sound of Magpies	까치 소리	Ggachi Sori	1967		
A Swordsman in the Twilight	황혼의 검객	Hwanghonui Geomgaek	1967		

== Awards ==
- 1967, the 6th Grand Bell Awards : New Actress (청춘극장)
- 1967, the 5th Blue Dragon Film Awards : Favorite Actress
- 1968, the 4th Baeksang Arts Awards : Film part, New Actress (안개)
- 1969, the 6th Blue Dragon Film Awards : Favorite Actress
- 1970, the 6th Baeksang Arts Awards : Film part, Favorite Actress selected by readers
- 1970, the 6th Baeksang Arts Awards : Film part, Best Acting Award (독짓는 늙은이)
- 1970, the 7th Blue Dragon Film Awards : Favorite Actress
- 1971, the 10th Grand Bell Awards : Best Actress (분례기)
- 1971, the 7th Baeksang Arts Awards : Film part, Best Acting Award (해변의 정사)
- 1971, the 7th Baeksang Arts Awards : Film part, Favorite Actress selected by readers
- 1971, the 8th Blue Dragon Film Awards : Favorite Actress
- 1972, the 8th Baeksang Arts Awards : Film part, Favorite Actress selected by readers
- 1972, the 9th Blue Dragon Film Awards : Best Actress (석화촌)
- 1972, the 9th Blue Dragon Film Awards : Favorite Actress
- 1973, the 9th Baeksang Arts Awards : Film part, Best Acting Award (석화촌)
- 1973, the 9th Baeksang Arts Awards : Film part, Favorite Actress selected by readers
- 1973, the 10th Blue Dragon Film Awards : Best Actress (효녀심청)
- 1973, the 10th Blue Dragon Film Awards : Favorite Actress
- 1974, the 10th Baeksang Arts Awards : Film part, Favorite Actress selected by readers
- 1975, the 11th Baeksang Arts Awards : Film part, Favorite Actress selected by readers
- 1992, the 12th Korean Association of Film Critics Awards : Best Acting Award(여자) (눈꽃)
- 1994, the 32nd Grand Bell Awards : Best Actress (만무방)
- 2010, the 47th Grand Bell Awards : Best Actress (Poetry)
- 2010, the 31st Blue Dragon Film Awards : Best Actress (Poetry)
- 2010, the 4th Asia Pacific Screen Awards: Best Performance by an Actress (Poetry)
- 2010, the 2010 Women in Film Korea Festival: Woman in Film of the Year (Poetry)
- 2011, the 13th Cinemanila International Film Festival : Best Actress (Poetry)
- 2011, the 37th Los Angeles Film Critics Association : Best Actress (Poetry)
- 2018, the 38th Korean Association of Film Critics Awards: Lifetime Award
- 2023, the Korean Film Achievement Award at the 28th Busan International Film Festival (posthumous).
