= List of South Korean films of 1967 =

A list of films produced in South Korea in 1967:

Title	Director	Cast	Genre	Notes
1967
Coming Back	Lee Man-hee	Kim Jin-kyu	Melodrama	Best Film at the Grand Bell Awards
Dream	Shin Sang-ok			
Flame in the Valley	Kim Soo-yong	Shin Young-kyun	Literary melodrama	Best Film at the Blue Dragon Film Awards
Guests Who Arrived on the Last Train	Yu Hyun-mok	Moon Hee		
Mist	Kim Soo-yong	Shin Sung-il		
Phantom Queen	Shin Sang-ok			
Space Monster Wangmagwi	Kwon Hyeok-jin	Nam Koong Won	Kaiju	
Three Henpecked Generations	Yu Hyun-mok			
Why the Cuckoo Cries	Lee Kyu-woong	Kim Ji-mee	Horror melodrama	
Yonggary	Kim Ki-duk		Kaiju	
Bravo Beauty; Minyeo Manse		Nam Jeong-im		
Monster Yonggari; Daegoesu Yonggari		Nam Jeong-im		
An Early Morning Departure; Saebyeok Gil		Nam Jeong-im		
Full Ship; Manseon		Nam Jeong-im		
Tearful Farewell; Tteugeoun Annyeong		Nam Jeong-im		
Two Wayfarers; Du Nageune		Nam Jeong-im		
Dongsimcho; Dongsimcho		Nam Jeong-im		
Dolmuji; Dolmusi		Nam Jeong-im		
Tomorrow, I Will Smile; Naeireun Utja		Nam Jeong-im		
A Madame; Anbangmanim		Nam Jeong-im		
Lost Migrant; Gil-ireun Cheolsae		Nam Jeong-im		
Miracle; Gijeok		Nam Jeong-im		
Soil; Heuk		Nam Jeong-im		
Bachelor Daughter-in-law; Haksa Myeoneuri		Nam Jeong-im		
A swordsman Pung-unui Geomgaek		Nam Jeong-im		
History of the Three States; Pung-un Samgukji		Nam Jeong-im		
Disclosure; Pongno		Nam Jeong-im		
A Deviation; Talseon		Nam Jeong-im		
A Virtuous Woman; Chilbuyeollyeo		Nam Jeong-im		
Bachelor Governor; Chonggak Wonnim		Nam Jeong-im		
Lovers on Grassland; Chowonui Yeonindeul		Nam Jeong-im		
A Red-and-blue Gauze Lantern; Cheongsachorong		Nam Jeong-im		
The Sun And the Moon; Irwol		Nam Jeong-im		
Stroller; Yeogma		Nam Jeong-im		
Confession of an Actress; Eoneu Yeobaeu-ui Gobaek	Kim Soo-yong	Nam Jeong-im		
An Angry Calf; Seongnan Songaji		Nam Jeong-im		
A Secret Talk; Mireo		Nam Jeong-im		
Madam of Myeong-wol Kwan; Myeong-wolgwan Assi		Nam Jeong-im		
Deep in my Heart		Nam Jeong-im		
Tourist Train; Gwan-gwang Yeolcha		Nam Jeong-im		
Accusation; Gobal		Nam Jeong-im		
Heartbreaks; Gaseum Apeuge		Nam Jeong-im		
I Want to Go; Gagopa		Nam Jeong-im		
The Queen of Elegy; Ellejiui Yeowang		Nam Jeong-im		
Sound of Magpies; Ggachi Sori		Nam Jeong-im		
Did I Come to Cry; Ullyeogo Naega Wanna		Nam Jeong-im		
Step-mother; Gyemo		Nam Jeong-im		
Three Swordsmen of Iljimae; Iljimae Samgeomgaeg		Nam Jeong-im		
The Hateful King; Sanggammama Miwoyo		Nam Jeong-im		
One-sided Love of Princess; Gongjunimui Jjaksarang		Nam Jeong-im		
Injo Restoration; Injobanjeong		Nam Jeong-im		
The Queen Moonjeong; Munjeong-wanghu		Nam Jeong-im		
Bobbed Hair; Danbalmeori		Nam Jeong-im		
A Female Student President; Yeodaesaeng Sajang		Nam Jeong-im		
An Attachment in Hawaii; Hawaiui Yeonjeong		Nam Jeong-im		
A King's Command; Eomyeong		Nam Jeong-im		
Hail; Bing-u		Nam Jeong-im		
The Freezing Point; Bingjeom		Nam Jeong-im		
Female Power; Chimabaram		Nam Jeong-im		
Street N. 66; 66beongaui Hyeolyeon		Nam Jeong-im		
A Girl Rowdy; Nangja Mangnani		Nam Jeong-im		
Four Sisters; Nejamae		Nam Jeong-im		
Public Cemetery	Cheol-hwi Kwon	Geum-bong Do, Hae Hwang, Ae-ran Jeong, Mi-ae Kang	horror	
