= Ahn In-sook =

South Korean actress (born 1952)

Ahn In-Sook
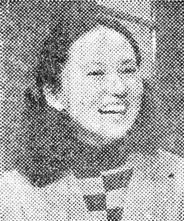
- Ahn in 1974
- Born: October 18, 1952 (age 73); Seoul, South Korea
- Education: Chung-Ang University
- Occupation: Actress
- Years active: 1963–?

Korean name
- Hangul: 안인숙
- Hanja: 安仁淑
- RR: An Insuk
- MR: An Insuk

Ahn In-sook (Korean: 안인숙; or spelled Ahn In-suk; born October 8, 1952) is a South Korean actress. Ahn was born in Seoul and graduated from Chung-Ang University with a major in film and theater. Ahn was a member of the KBS children's choir and debuted as a daughter of actor Kim Jin-kyu in the 1963 film Bubu joyak directed by Choi Hun.

== Filmography ==
*Note; the whole list is referenced.

Year	English title	Korean title	Romanization	Role	Director
	Unforgettable Mother Love		Ijji moshal mojeong		
	The Stars Heavenly Home		Byeoldeul-ui gohyang		
	Sweet Wind		Yeonpung		
	It Rained Yesterday		Eojenaelin bi		
	A Little Bird		Jag-eun sae		
	Three Brothers		Adeul Samhyeongje		
	A Match		Seungbu		
	The Principal Visits Seoul		Gyojangseonsaeng sanggyeonggi		
	Married on the Bull		Hwangsotago sijib-wassne		
	The Military Academy		Yuggunsagwanhaggyo		
	A Family with Many Daughters		Ttalbujajib		
	Special Investigation Bureau : Kim So-san, the Kisaeng		Teugbyeolsusabonbu-wa gisaeng Gim Sosan		
	The Great Glory		Tteugeo-un yeonggwang		
	Homecoming		Gwihyang		
	A Case of a College Girl, Lee Nan-hee of Special Investigation Center		Teugbyeolsusabonbu yeodaesaeng I Nanhuisageon		
	The Two Brothers		Du hyeongje		
	Tto-Sunyi and Gap-Sunyi		Ttosun-i-wa Gapsun-i		
	Bloody fist		Hyeolgwon		
	Friendship		Ujeong		
	Along With Love, Along With Smile		Jeongttala us-eumttala		
	On The Road at Night		Bamgil		
	Don't Forget Love Although We Say Goodbye		He-eojyeodo salangman-eun		
	A Woman Teacher		Yeoseonsaeng		
	Ever Smiling Mr. Park		Usgo saneun Bakseobang		
	I Will Give It All		Akkim-eobs-i bachili		
	A Family Tree		Jogbo		
1971	Bun-rye's Story		Bunlyegi		
	Bachelor in Trouble		Malsseongnan chonggag		
	I Want To Be In Your Arms Again		Geudae gaseum-e dasihanbeon		
	Darling, I'm sorry		Anae-yeo mi-anhada		
	When We Meet Again		Mannabwado jigeum-eun		
	Not A Good Wife		Cheobog		
	A Second Mother		Duljjae-eomeoni		
	Old Gentleman in Myeongdong		Myeongdongnosinsa		
	Big Brother's Marriage		Gyeolhondaejagjeon		
	Though There was No Vow		Yagsog-eun eobs-eossjiman		
	If He Were the Father		Geu bun-i appalamyeon		
	The Revengeful Man		Wonhan-ui paldosana-i		
1970	Wang-geon, the Great		Taejo Wang Geon		
	Three Odd Ladies		Byeolnan yeoja		
	Fair Lady of Tapgol		Tabgol-assi		
	Pagoda of No Shadow		Mu-yeongtab		
	Yong-pal, A King of Namdaemoon area		Namdaemunchulsin Yongpal-i		
	Girls from Eight Provinces		Paldogasina-i		
	Men of the Reserve Troops		Yebigun paldo sana-i		
	How Can I Forget		Ij-eul suga iss-eulkka		
	Top Misers		Paldonolaeng-i		
	A Girl Born in the Year of Tiger		Beomttigasinae		
	Female Soldiers from All The Provinces		Paldo-yeogun		
	Treason		Moban		
	Odd Bride		Byeolnan saedaeg		
	A Mysterious Sword		Bigeom		
	Madam Freedom		Jayu Buin		
	The Foe		Ibaeg-osibjo		
	Wild Girl		Yaseongnyeo		
	A Letter from an Unknown Woman		Moreuneun Yeoin-ui Pyeonji		
	Immortal Rivers and Mountains		Mangogangsan		
	Sky and Star		Haneul-eul Bogo Byeol-eul Ttago		
	The 8th Street Port		Hang-gu 8beonga		
	Reminiscence		Chu-eog		
	Window		Chang		
	Bitter But Once Again		Miwodo Dasi Hanbeon		
	Sorry to Give You Trouble		Sinse Jom Jijagu-yo		
	Hiding Tears		Nunmul-eul Gamchugo		
	Singing Fair		Norae Haneun Bangnamhoe		
	Flower Sandals		Kkot Beoseon		
	The Main Room		Naesil		
	School Excursion		Suhag Yeohaeng		
	I Like It Hot		Ddeugeoweoseo Joayo		
	Installment Secretary		Wolbu Nambiseo		
	The Second Wife		Huchwidaeg		
	Three Sisters of House Maid		Singmo Samhyeongje		
	A Returned Man of Korea		Doraon Paldo Sanai		
	Shanghai Blues		Shanghai Bureuseu		
	Yeojin Tribe		Yeojinjog		
	Quick Ladder of Success		Chulsegado		
	Bun-nyeo		Bun-nyeo		
	Labyrinth		Miro		
	Blue Writings of Farewell		Paran Ibyeorui Geulssi		
	Sweetheart		Jeongdeun nim		
	Blue Light, Red Light		Cheongdeung Hongdeung		
	Purple Ribbon		Jaju Daenggi		
	Madame Anemone		Anemone Madam		
	Cloisonne Ring		Chilbo Banji		
	Potato		Gamja		
	Without Despair		Jeolmang-eun Eopda		
1969	Femme Fatale, Jang Hee-bin		Yohwa, Jang Hee-bin		
	Bell of Emile		Emile Jong		
	Crossed Love		Eommaya Nunaya Gangbyeon Salja		
	Good Bye Dad		Abba An-nyeong		
	Princess Guseul		Guseul Gongju		
	Flowers Over the Country		Gangsane Kkochi Pine		
	Remarriage		Jaehon		
	Scandal		Pamun		
	The Sister's Diary		Eunni-eui Ilgi		
	I will Give You Everything		Mongttang Deurilkkayo		
	Romance Mama		Romaenseu Mama		
1967	Guests Who Arrived on the Last Train		Makcharo On Sonnimdeul		
	A Swordsman in the Twilight		Hwanghonui Geomgaek		
1967	Flame in the Valley		Sanbul		
	Sorrowful Youth		Cheongchun Geukjang		
	Gang Myeong-hwa		Gang Myeong-hwa		
	Soil		Heuk		
	Chun-Hui		Chunhui		
	Bachelor Governor		Chonggak Wonnim		
	A Teacher in an Island		Seommaeul Seonsaeng		
	The Last Day of the Week		Majimak Yoil		
	Step-mother		Gyemo		
	Injo Restoration		Injobanjeong		
	Elder Brother's Wife		Hyeongsu		
1967	Why the Cuckoo Cries		Dugyeonsae Uneun Sayeon		
	The Whole Night		Jong-ya		
	A Misty Grassland		Angaekkin Chowon		
	Five Scoundrels		Oinui Geondal		
	Come Back, Oh My Daughter Geumdan		Dol-a-ora Nae Ttal Geumdan-a		
	The Same Starlight on this Land		I ttang-edo Jeo Byeolbicheul		
	A Legend of Urchins		Yalgaejeon		
	The Beautiful Eyes		Areumdaun Nundongja		
	The Double Rainbow Hill		Ssangmujigae Tteuneun Eondeok		
	The Wild Tiger		Gwang-ya-ui Horang-i		
	The Couple Testimony		Bubu Joyak		

== Awards ==
- 1975 the 11th Baeksang Arts Awards : Best Acting in TV
- 1975 the 11th Baeksang Arts Awards : Favorite Film Actress selected by readers
