= Bun-rye's Story =

- Theatrical poster
- Hangul: 분례기
- Hanja: 糞禮記
- RR: Bunryegi
- MR: Pullyegi
- Directed by: Yu Hyun-mok
- Written by: Bang Young-wung
- Produced by: Kim Tai-soo
- Starring: Yoon Jeong-hee
- Cinematography: You Young-gill
- Edited by: Kim Chang-soon
- Music by: Kim Hee-jo
- Production company: Tae Chang Enterprises Co.
- Release date: 6 May 1971
- Running time: 102 minutes
- Country: South Korea
- Language: Korean

Bun-rye's Story (Korean: 분례기) is a 1971 South Korean drama film directed by Yu Hyun-mok. It was based on a novel by Bang Young-wung.

== Plot ==
Bun-rye, the eldest daughter in a poor family, is violated by Yong-pal, who is a married man, and out of desperation she becomes a concubine of Young-cheol, a gambler who is impotent. Kong Jo-shi is in love with Bun-rye, though she still has feelings for Yong-pal. After losing his money, Young-cheol takes out his anger on Bun-rye and throws her out of his house. In retaliation, Jo-shi kills Young-cheol, and Bun-rye is driven to madness.

== Cast ==
- Yoon Jeong-hee
- Lee Soon-jae
- Heo Jang-kang
- Choi Nam-Hyun
- Ju Jeung-ryu
- Sa Mi-ja
- Ahn In-sook

== Release ==
Bun-rye's Story was rated 18 and opened in South Korea on 6 May 1971 at Kukdo Theater. The film received a total of 96,281 admissions.

== Awards ==
Bun-rye's Story won a number of awards at the 10th Grand Bell Awards in 1971, including Best Director for Yu Hyun-mok, Best Actress for Yoon Hung-hee, Best Supporting Actress for Sa Mi-ja, and Best Music for Kim Hee-jo.

=== Grand Bell Awards ===
- Best Director: Yu Hyun-mok
- Best Actress: Yoon Jeong-hee
- Best Supporting Actress: Sa Mi-ja
- Best Musical Score: Kim Hee-jo
- Best Sound Recording: Lee Kyung-Soon

=== PaekSang Arts Awards ===
- Award for Film Category: Heo Jang-kang

== Recovery ==
Although once thought to be lost, a print of Bun-rye's Story was recovered from overseas and restored by the Korean Film Council, who screened the film at their theater in northern Seoul on 18 May 2009.

== See also ==
- List of rediscovered films
