= Kun-Woo Paik =

South Korean pianist (born 1946)

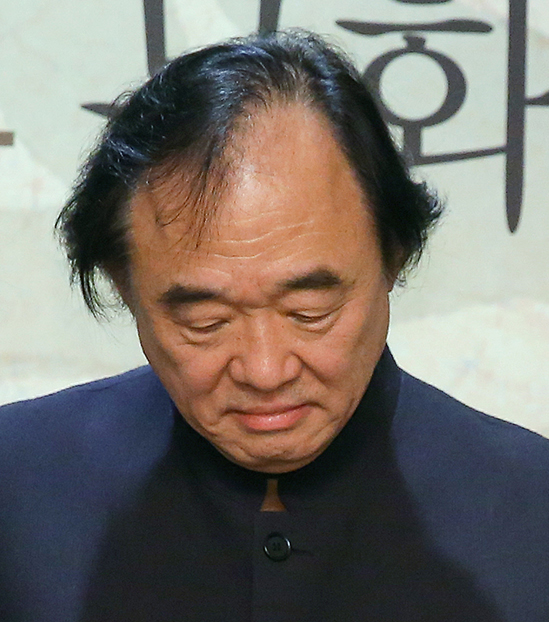
- Paik in 2014

Korean name
- Hangul: 백건우
- Hanja: 白建宇
- RR: Baek Geonu
- MR: Paek Kŏnu

Kun-woo Paik (Korean: 백건우; born May 10, 1946, in Seoul) is a South Korean pianist. He has performed with multiple orchestras, including the London Symphony Orchestra, the BBC Symphony Orchestra, and the Saint Petersburg Philharmonic.

== Early life ==
Kun-Woo Paik was born in Seoul. He gave his first concert, aged 10, with the Korean National Orchestra, playing Grieg's Piano Concerto. In the following years, he performed many important works in Korea, including several local premieres such as Mussorgsky's Pictures at an Exhibition. Later he studied in New York (Juilliard School), London, and Italy with Rosina Lhévinne, Ilona Kabos, Guido Agosti and Wilhelm Kempff. Kun-Woo Paik is a laureate of the Naumburg and Busoni International Piano Competitions.

== Career ==
Over the years, Kun-Woo Paik has performed recitals in major musical centres such as the Lincoln Center, Carnegie Hall, Wigmore Hall, and Berlin Philharmonie. He has performed with such orchestras as the London Symphony Orchestra, the BBC Symphony Orchestra (Last Night of the Proms 1987), Pittsburgh Symphony, Russian National Orchestra, Saint Petersburg Philharmonic, Orchestre de Paris, Orchestre National de France, Ensemble Orchestral de Paris, Rai Torino, Warsaw Philharmonic, English Chamber Orchestra, and Polish National Radio Orchestra, with such conductors as Mariss Jansons, Sir Neville Marriner, Lawrence Foster, Mikhail Pletnev, Dmitri Kitayenko, James Conlon, John Nelson, and Eliahu Inbal. Kun-Woo Paik is also a regular guest artist at major music festivals such as the Berlin Festwochen, Aix-en-Provence, La Roque-d'Anthéron, Colmar, Spoleto, Aldeburgh, "Mostly Mozart" and Ravinia Festivals, and has toured extensively in Australia, New Zealand, Asia and Italy.

His repertoire comprises such rare works as Busoni's Piano Concerto, Fauré's Fantasy for piano and orchestra and Liszt's Fantasy on themes from Berlioz's "Lélio". Kun-Woo Paik also performs a wide selection of transcriptions by Liszt and Berlioz and is the dedicatee of Suk-Hi Kang's piano concerto.

Paik has recorded the complete Prokofiev piano concertos with Antoni Wit and the Polish Radio Symphony Orchestra for RCA (Diapason d'Or in 1993), the complete Rachmaninoff piano concertos with Vladimir Fedoseyev and the Moscow Radio Symphony Orchestra (BMG), as well as several solo CDs of Scriabin, Liszt, Mussorgsky, Rachmaninoff and Mendelssohn piano music. In 2000, he signed an exclusive recording contract with Decca Classics. His first release featured the piano transcriptions of the organ works of J. S. Bach made by Busoni. Between 2005 and 2007, Decca recorded Paik in the complete piano sonatas of Beethoven.

He was the Artistic Director of the Emerald Coast Music Festival in Dinard (France) for 21 years, from 1993 to 2014. He programmed a large range of music, from baroque, through romantic, and contemporary music; performed by top international artists to a large audience, and notably with free outdoor concerts, concerts for children, and concerts with young virtuosi. In November 2014, he was fired from this position by the Mayor of Dinard, Martine Craveia-Schütz, to be replaced by the Egyptian pianist Ramzi Yassa; Kun-Woo Paik expressed in a long letter to the Mayor of Dinard his "stupefaction and deep sorrow".

Kun-Woo Paik was made "Chevalier de l'ordre des arts et des lettres" by the French Government in 2000. In September 2000, he was the first Korean artist to be officially invited to perform in China.

== Personal life ==
Paik has resided in Paris with his wife, actress Yoon Jeong-hee since 1974. Yoon was a star of the late 1960s, commonly referred to as one of "The First Troika" by the South Korean news media, along with two other actresses in rivalry, Moon Hee, and Nam Jeong-im. Paik has a daughter, Paik Jin-hi, who is a violinist.

== Discography ==
- 2020 Schumann - DG
- 2018 Chopin: The Complete Nocturnes - DG
- 2012 Brahms Intermezzi - DG
- 2010 Brahms Piano Concerto No.1, Variations; Czech Philharmonic Orchestra, conductor Eliahu Inbal - DG
- 2008 The complete piano sonatas of Beethoven issued in Korea.
- 2007 Beethoven: Piano Sonatas 27 to 32 - Decca
- 2006 Beethoven: Piano Sonatas 1 to 15 - Decca
- 2005 Beethoven: Piano Sonatas 16 to 26 - Decca
- 2003 Chopin: Complete works for piano and orchestra; Warsaw Philharmonic Orchestra, conductor Antoni Wit - Decca
- 2002 Fauré Piano works - Diapason d'Or award - Decca
- 2001 Hahn Works for two pianos, with Hüseyin Sermet - Naïve V4902
- 2000 J.S. Bach: Piano works in transcriptions by Busoni - Toccata BW564, 10 chorale preludes, Chaconne BW1004 - Decca
- 2000 Piano works by Liszt, Debussy, Poulenc and Satie - EMI Music
- 1998 Rachmaninoff: Complete Works for Piano and Orchestra
- 1998 Mendelssohn: Songs Without Words
- 1996 Scriabin: Piano works
- 1994 Prokofiev: Complete Piano Concertos
- 1993 Schmitt: Three rhapsodies for two pianos, Op. 53, with Huseyin Sermet - Auvidis
- 1992 Mendelssohn: Songs Without Words - Diapason d'Or award - Dante
- 1992 Rachmaninoff: The 4 piano concertos, Rhapsody on a Theme of Paganini - RCA
- 1992 Rachmaninoff: Piano sonatas 1 and 2 - Diapason d'Or award - Dante
- 1992 Prokofiev: Piano Sonatas 6, 7 and 8 - Diapason d'Or award - Dante
- 1992 Ravel: Complete Piano Works
- 1992 Scriabin: Piano works Diapason d'Or award - Dante
- 1992 Scriabin: Sonata Nos 6 and 9 and other piano works - Diapason d'Or award - Dante
- 1991 Prokofiev: The 5 Piano concertos; Polish National Radio Orchestra - Disque d'or - Prix Nouvelle ~Académie du Disque - 2CD Naxos
- 1991 Liszt: Piano works and music by French composers (Poulenc, Debussy, Satie) 2 CD - Virgin
- 1991 Ravel: The works for solo piano - Diapason d'Or award - Dante
- 1983 Ravel: Piano Concerto in G, Concerto for Left Hand; Stuttgart Radio Symphony, Gary Bertini, conductor - Pro Arte Sinfonia

== Awards ==
- 1971 Winner of Naumburg International Piano Competition
- 1992 Golden Diapason Prize (Alexander Scriabin Album)
- 1993 Golden Diapason Prize (Sergei Prokofiev Album)
- 2000 Ho-Am Prize in the Arts
- 2009 Kyung-Ahm Prize
- 2010 Order of Cultural Merit
