= Nam Jeong-im =

South Korean actress (1945–1992)

- Portrait of Nam
- Born: July 21, 1945; Gwangju, Gyeonggi, South Korea
- Died: September 2, 1992 (aged 47); Seoul, South Korea
- Occupation: Actress
- Years active: 1966–1978

Korean name
- Hangul: 이민자
- RR: I Minja
- MR: I Minja

Stage name
- Hangul: 남정임
- Hanja: 南貞姙
- RR: Nam Jeongim
- MR: Nam Chŏngim

Nam Jeong-im (Korean: 남정임; July 21, 1945 – September 2, 1992) was a South Korean actress. Nam was commonly referred to as one of the "Troika" along with her rival actresses, Yoon Jeong-hee and Moon Hee of the 1960s and early 1970s.

== Filmography ==
*Note; the whole list is referenced.

Year	English title	Korean title	Romanization	Role	Director
1978	Sound of Laughter		Us-eumsoli		
1976	I Confess		Naneun gobaeghanda		
1972	Mother		Eomeoni		
1971	The International Crime organization		Gugje-amsaldan		
1971	Wild Magpie		Oelo-un sankkachi		
1971	Two Women Pent Up With Grudge		Hanmanh-eun du yeo-in		
1971	Wear the Black Gloves		Geom-eun janggab-eul kkyeola		
1971	Horror in the Underworld		Amheugga-ui gongpo		
1971	New Year's Soup		Tteoggug		
1971	Pier Three at Sunset		Hwanghon-ui je3budu		
1971	The First Love		Cheosjeong		
1971	Between You and Me		Dangsingwa na sa-i-e		
1971	Young Master the Urchin		Gaegujang-i dolyeonnim		
1971	Little Boss		Kkomasajanggwa yeobiseo		
1971	Glad to Say Goodbye		Hangboghan ibyeol		
1971	Big Brother, Yong-Chil		Yongchil-ihyeongnim		
1970	The 25th Hour in the Underworld		Amheugga-ui 25si		
1970	Chaser		Mihaengja		
1970	Goodbye, Tokyo		Gudba-i Donggyeong		
1970	Escape in the Mist		Angaesog-ui talchul		
1970	Agony of Man		Namjaneun goelo-wo		
1970	My Dear Maria		Salanghaneun Maria		
1970	Night of Tokyo		Donggyeong-ui bamhaneul		
1970	Marriage Classroom		Gyeolhongyosil		
1970	Back Alley No. 5		Dwisgolmog obeonji		
1970	The Shadow		Geulimja		
1970	A Dangerous Husband		Wiheomhan nampyeon		
1970	Miss Chicken		Misseu chondalg		
1970	A Jolly Fellow		Kwaenam-a		
1970	Swordsmen From Eight Provinces		Paldogeomgaeg		
1970	Heartless on Harbor		Hanggumujeong		
1970	A Man of Honor		Uili-e sanda		
1970	The Invincible of the Far East		Geugdong-ui mujeogja		
1970	Rage		Bunno		
1970	One-eyed Park		Aekkunun Bak		
1970	Have No Mercy		Neoneun injeongsajeong bojimala		
1970	An Unwanted Visitor in the Sunset		Seog-yang-ui bulcheonggaeg		
1970	Why Life is so Cruel to Women		Wae yeojaman-i ul-eo-ya hana		
1970	We Wish You a Long Life, Mom and Dad!		Eomma-appa Olaesase-yo		
1970	Mistress		Manim		
1970	Female Soldiers from All the Provinces		Paldo-yeogun		
1970	Treason		Moban		
1970	Dolsoi, a Man of Loyalty		Uili-ui sana-i Dolsoe		
1970	Love in the Snowfield		Seol-won-ui jeong		
1970	Friendship of Hope		Nae-il-issneun ujeong		
1969	You've Made a Mistake		Jalmot Bosyeot-dagu		
1969	Sun of Young Man		Jeolmeuni-ui Tae-yang		
1969	The 7th Man		Je7ui Sanai		
1969	Private Kim		Yug-gun Gimilbyeong		
1969	Immortal Rivers and Mountains		Mangogangsan		
1969	Invisible Man		Tumyeong Ingan		
1969	Barber of Jangmaru Village		Jangmaruchon-ui Ibalsa		
1969	Kkotnae		Kkotnae		
1969	Rejected First Love		Amuri Mi-wodo		
1969	Wild Girl		Yaseongnyeo		
1969	Women of Yi Dynasty		Ijo Yeoin Janhogsa		
1969	The Night of Full Moon		Siboya		
1969	Vice-President		Bu-gakha		
1969	Forget-me-not		Mulmangcho		
1969	Visit of Spy		Jigeumeun Jugeul Ttaega Anida		
1969	Shanghai Blues		Shanghai Bureuseu		
1969	March of a Wife		Buin Haengcha		
1969	Success		Eog-ulhamyeon Chulsehara		
1969	Starting Point		Sibaljeom		
1969	Young Women		Jeolmeun Yeoindeul		
1969	Newly Married		Makdongi Sinhon 10 gaewol		
1969	Jin and Min		Jug-eodo Joa		
1969	Jumper Q		Jamba Kyu		
1969	The Last Letter		Majimak Pyeonji		
1969	A Returned Singer		Doraon Seonchang		
1969	The Last Left-hander		Majimak Oensonjabi		
1969	Spring, Spring		Bom Bom		
1969	Wind		Baram		
1969	The Second Wife		Huchwidaeg		
1969	Sword		Pilsal-ui Geom		
1969	A Plateau		Gowon		
1969	Under the Roof		Eoneu Jibung Miteseo		
1969	Three Sisters of House Maid		Singmo Samhyeongje		
1969	The Man of the Man		Sanai Jung Sanai		
1969	Beauty in Black Rose Castle		Heugjangmi Seong-ui Minyeo		
1969	Chunwon Lee Gwang-Su		Chunwon Lee Gwangsu		
1969	Chaser		Chugyeogja		
1969	Original Intention		Chosim		
1969	The Sisters		Idaero Gandahaedo		
1969	O-Gong-Nyeo Legend		O Gongnyeo-ui Han		
1969	Women Placed Above Men		Yeoseong Sang-wi Sidae		
1969	Saint and Witch		Seongnyeo-wa Manyeo		
1969	New Bride		Sae Saeksi		
1969	Duel of Midnight		Simya-ui Daegyeol		
1969	Intruder in Midnight		Simya-ui Nanibja		
1969	Tomorrow		Naeil-eun Jugeuljirado		
1969	Black Cordon		Geomeun Bisangseon		
1969	For Once in Lifetime		Nae Saeng-ae Dan Hanbeon		
1969	Can't Forget		Mot-ijeo		
1969	Catching Tigers		Sane Gaya Beomeul Japji		
1969	Bring Back the Night Once More		Geu Bamiyeo Dasi Hanbeon		
1969	Ruler of the Underworld		Amheug-ga-ui Jibaeja		
1969	A Young, Naughty Master		Gaegujang-i Doryeonnim		
1968	Quick Ladder of Success		Chulsegado		
1968	The Geisha of Korea		Paldo Gisaeng		
1968	Bun-nyeo		Bun-nyeo		
1968	A Wandering Swordsman and 108 Bars of Gold		Nageune Geomgaek; Hwanggeum 108 Gwan		
1968	Lady in Dream		Mongnyeo		
1968	Unfulfilled Love		Motdahan Sarang		
1968	The Sorrow of Separation		Isu		
1968	Bell Daegam		Bang-ul Daegam		
1968	Your Name		Geudae Ireumeun		
1968	Born in May		O wol-saeng		
1968	Childish Daughter-in-law		Pal-pun Myeoneuri		
1968	The Life of a Woman		Yeoja-ui Ilsaeng		
1968	Sam-hyeon-yuk-gak		Sam-hyeon-yuk-gak		
1968	A Devil's Invitation		Akma-ui Chodae		
1968	Love		Saranghaetneunde		
1968	The Wings of Lee Sang		Lee Sang-ui Nalgae		
1968	The King of a Rock Cave		Amgul Wang		
1968	Five Assassins		Oin-ui jagaek		
1968	Conditions of a Virgin		Cheonyeo-ui Jogeon		
1968	Nice Girls		Meojaeng-i Agassideul		
1968	Going Well		Jal Doegamnida		
1968	Madam Hwasan		Hwasandaek		
1968	Salt Pond		Sujeonjidae		
1968	I Won't Hate You		Miweohaji Angetda		
1968	A Wonderer		Pungranggaek		
1968	Prince Yang-nyeong		Bangrangdaegun		
1968	The Male Beauty Artist		Namja Miyongsa		
1968	The Sister's Diary		Eunni-eui Ilgi		
1968	Revenge		Boksu		
1968	A Pastoral Song		Mokga		
1968	A Male Housekeeper		Namja Singmo		
1968	Trial		Simpan		
1968	Three-thousand Miles of Legend		Jeonseol-ddara Samcheon-ri		
1968	Femme Fatale, Jang Hee-bin		Yohwa, Jang Hee-bin		
1968	A Wondering Swordsman		Yurang-ui Geom-ho		
1968	Outing		Oechul		
1968	Bell of Emile		Emile Jong		
1968	A Midnight Cry		Simya-ui Bimyeong		
1968	Pure Love		Sunjeongsanha		
1968	Sun-deok		Sundeogi		
1968	White Night		Baegya		
1968	Grudge		Han		
1968	Burning Passions		Jeongyeom		
1968	Mistress Manong		Jeongbu Manong		
1968	A Man Like the Wind		Baramgateun Sanai		
1968	Secret Order		Milmyeong		
1968	Day and Night		Natgwa Bam		
1968	Nam Jeong-im Goes to Women's Army Corps		Nam Jeongim Yeogune Gada		
1968	Nam		Nam		
1968	Ghost Story		Goedam		
1968	Flowers Over the Country		Gangsane Kkochi Pine		
1968	Winds and Clouds		Pung-un; Imran Yahwa		
1968	Mr. Gu at Sajik Village		Sajikgol Guseobang		
1968	Living in the Sky		Changgong-e Sanda		
1968	Romance Mama		Romaenseu Mama		
1968	Youth Gone in Void; Mother's Balloon		Heogong-e Jin Cheongchun; Eomma-ui Pungseon		
1968	A Great Hero, Kim Seon-dal		Cheonha Hogeol Kim Seon-dal		
1968	Confessions of Youth		Cheongchun Gobaek		
1967	The Guests of the Last Train		Makcharo On Sonnimdeul		
1967	Bravo Beauty		Minyeo Manse		
1967	Monster Yonggari		Daegoesu Yonggari		
1967	An Early Morning Departure		Saebyeok Gil		
1967	Full Ship		Manseon		
1967	Tearful Farewell		Tteugeoun Annyeong		
1967	Two Wayfarers		Du Nageune		
1967	Dongsimcho		Dongsimcho		
1967	Dolmuji		Dolmusi		
1967	Tomorrow, I Will Smile		Naeireun Utja		
1967	A Madame		Anbangmanim		
1967	Lost Migrant		Gil-ireun Cheolsae		
1967	Miracle		Gijeok		
1967	Soil		Heuk		
1967	Bachelor Daughter-in-law		Haksa Myeoneuri		
1967	A Swordsman		Pung-unui Geomgaek		
1967	History of the Three States		Pung-un Samgukji		
1967	Disclosure		Pongno		
1967	A Deviation		Talseon		
1967	A Virtuous Woman		Chilbuyeollyeo		
1967	Bachelor Governor		Chonggak Wonnim		
1967	Lovers on Grassland		Chowonui Yeonindeul		
1967	A Red-and-blue Gauze Lantern		Cheongsachorong		
1967	The Sun And the Moon		Irwol		
1967	Stroller		Yeogma		
1967	Confession of an Actress		Eoneu Yeobaeu-ui Gobaek		
1967	An Angry Calf		Seongnan Songaji		
1967	A Secret Talk		Mireo		
1967	Madam of Myeong-wol Kwan		Myeong-wolgwan Assi		
1967	Deep in my Heart				
1967	Tourist Train		Gwan-gwang Yeolcha		
1967	Accusation		Gobal		
1967	Heartbreaks		Gaseum Apeuge		
1967	I Want to Go		Gagopa		
1967	The Queen of Elegy		Ellejiui Yeowang		
1967	Sound of Magpies		Ggachi Sori		
1967	Did I Come to Cry		Ullyeogo Naega Wanna		
1967	Step-mother		Gyemo		
1967	Three Swordsmen of Iljimae		Iljimae Samgeomgaeg		
1967	The Hateful King		Sanggammama Miwoyo		
1967	One-sided Love of Princess		Gongjunimui Jjaksarang		
1967	Injo Restoration		Injobanjeong		
1967	The Queen Moonjeong		Munjeong-wanghu		
1967	Bobbed Hair		Danbalmeori		
1967	A Female Student President		Yeodaesaeng Sajang		
1967	An Attachment in Hawaii		Hawaiui Yeonjeong		
1967	A King's Command		Eomyeong		
1967	Hail		Bing-u		
1967	The Freezing Point		Bingjeom		
1967	Female Power		Chimabaram		
1967	Street N. 66		66beongaui Hyeolyeon		
1967	A Girl Rowdy		Nangja Mangnani		
1967	Four Sisters		Nejamae		
1966	Gunsmoke		Choyeon		
1966	Court Ladies		Sang-gung Nain		
1966	A Story of a Nobleman		Yangbanjeon		
1966	I Will Be a King for the Day		Oneul-eun Wang		
1966	Affection		Yujeong		
1966	Let's Meet at Walkerhill		Wokeohileseo Mannapsida		
1966	Villains Era		Aginsidae		
1966	Hit the Bull's Eye		Baekbalbaekjung		
1966	Nostalgia		Manghyang		
1966	The Sword of Iljimae		Iljimae Pilsaui Geom		
1966	A Gisaeng with a Bachelor's Degree		Haksa Gisaeng		
1966	A Killer's Note		Salin Sucheop		
1966	Love Detective		Yeonae Tamjeong		
1966	Living in a Rented House		Setbang Sali		
1966	The Heart Feels Empty		Heomuhan Maeum		

== Awards ==
*Note; the whole list is referenced.

- 1966, the 4th Blue Dragon Film Awards : Special Award for New Actress
- 1967, the 3rd Baeksang Arts Awards : New Film Actress
- 1967, the 5th Blue Dragon Film Awards : Favorite Actress
- 1969, the 6th Blue Dragon Film Awards : Best Actress
- 1967, the 6th Blue Dragon Film Awards : Favorite Actress
- 1970, the 7th Blue Dragon Film Awards : Favorite Actress
