= List of South Korean films of 1968 =

A list of films produced in South Korea in 1968:

| Title | Director | Cast | Genre | Notes |
|---|---|---|---|---|
1968
| 7 Secret Envoys | | | | |
| Arirang | Yu Hyun-mok | | | |
| The Count of Monte Cristo | | | | |
| Descendants of Cain | Yu Hyun-mok | | | |
| The Devil's Invitation | | | | |
| Eunuch | Shin Sang-ok | | | |
| Golden Iron Man | Park Yeong-il | | Animated | |
| Hate But Once More | Jung So-young | | | |
| Nightmare | | | | |
| Prince Daewon | Shin Sang-ok | Shin Young-kyun; Kim Ji-mee | Historical drama | Best Film at the Grand Bell Awards |
| Woman | Kim Ki-young | | | |
| Quick Ladder of Success; Chulsegado | | Nam Jeong-im | | |
| The Geisha of Korea; Paldo Gisaeng | | Nam Jeong-im | | |
| Bun-nyeo; Bun-nyeo | | Nam Jeong-im | | |
| A Wandering Swordsman And 108 Bars of Gold; Nageune Geomgaek Hwanggeum 108 Gwan | | Nam Jeong-im | | |
| Lady in Dream; Mongnyeo | | Nam Jeong-im | | |
| Unfulfilled Love; Motdahan Sarang | | Nam Jeong-im | | |
| The Sorrow of Separation; Isu | | Nam Jeong-im | | |
| Bell Daegam; Bang-ul Daegam | | Nam Jeong-im | | |
| Your Name; Geudae Ireumeun | | Nam Jeong-im | | |
| Born in May; O wol-saeng | | Nam Jeong-im | | |
| Childish Daughter-in-law; Pal-pun Myeoneuri | | Nam Jeong-im | | |
| The Life of a Woman; Yeoja-ui Ilsaeng | | Nam Jeong-im | | |
| Sam-hyeon-yuk-gak; Sam-hyeon-yuk-gak | | Nam Jeong-im | | |
| A Devil's Invitation; Akma-ui Chodae | | Nam Jeong-im | | |
| Love; Saranghaetneunde | | Nam Jeong-im | | |
| The Wings of Lee Sang; Lee Sang-ui Nalgae | | Nam Jeong-im | | |
| The King of a Rock Cave; Amgul Wang | | Nam Jeong-im | | |
| Five Assassins; Oin-ui jagaek | | Nam Jeong-im | | |
| Conditions of a Virgin; Cheonyeo-ui Jogeon | | Nam Jeong-im | | |
| Nice Girls; Meojaeng-i Agassideul | | Nam Jeong-im | | |
| Going Well; Jal Doegamnida | | Nam Jeong-im | | |
| Madam Hwasan; Hwasandaek | | Nam Jeong-im | | |
| Salt Pond; Sujeonjidae 수전지대 | Kim Soo-yong | Nam Jeong-im, Lee Soon-jae, Do Kum-bong | | |
| I Won't Hate You; Miweohaji Angetda | | Nam Jeong-im | | |
| A Wonderer; Pungranggaek | | Nam Jeong-im | | |
| Prince Yang-nyeong; Bangrangdaegun | | Nam Jeong-im | | |
| The Male Beauty Artist; Namja Miyongsa | | Nam Jeong-im | | |
| The Sister's Diary; Eunni-eui Ilgi | | Nam Jeong-im | | |
| Revenge; Boksu | | Nam Jeong-im | | |
| A Pastoral Song; Mokga | | Nam Jeong-im | | |
| A Male Housekeeper; Namja Singmo | | Nam Jeong-im | | |
| Trial; Simpan | | Nam Jeong-im | | |
| Three-thousand Miles of Legend; Jeonseol-ddara Samcheon-ri | | Nam Jeong-im | | |
| Femme Fatale, Jang Hee-bin; Yohwa, Jang Hee-bin | Im Kwon-taek | Nam Jeong-im | | |
| A Wondering Swordsman; Yurang-ui Geom-ho | | Nam Jeong-im | | |
| Outing; Oechul | | Nam Jeong-im | | |
| Bell of Emile; Emile Jong | | Nam Jeong-im | | |
| A Midnight Cry; Simya-ui Bimyeong | | Nam Jeong-im | | |
| Pure Love; Sunjeongsanha | | Nam Jeong-im | | |
| Sun-deok; Sundeogi | | Nam Jeong-im | | |
| White Night; Baegya | | Nam Jeong-im | | |
| Grudge; Han | | Nam Jeong-im | | |
| Burning Passions; Jeongyeom | | Nam Jeong-im | | |
| Mistress Manong; Jeongbu Manong | | Nam Jeong-im | | |
| A Man Like the Wind; Baramgateun Sanai | | Nam Jeong-im | | |
| Secret Order; Milmyeong | | Nam Jeong-im | | |
| Day and Night; Natgwa Bam | | Nam Jeong-im | | |
| Nam Jeong-im Goes to Women's Army Corps; Nam Jeongim Yeogune Gada | | Nam Jeong-im | | |
| Nam; Nam | | Nam Jeong-im | | |
| Ghost Story; Goedam | | Nam Jeong-im | | |
| Flowers Over the Country; Gangsane Kkochi Pine | | Nam Jeong-im | | |
| Winds and Clouds; Pung-un; Imran Yahwa | | Nam Jeong-im | | |
| Mr. Gu at Sajik Village; Sajikgol Guseobang | | Nam Jeong-im | | |
| Living in the Sky; Changgong-e Sanda | | Nam Jeong-im | | |
| Romance Mama; Romaenseu Mama | | Nam Jeong-im | | |
| Youth Gone in Void; Mother's Balloon; Heogong-e Jin Cheongchun;Eomma-ui Pungseon | | Nam Jeong-im | | |
| A Great Hero, Kim Seon-dal; Cheonha Hogeol Kim Seon-dal | | Nam Jeong-im | | |
| Confessions of Youth; Cheongchun Gobaek | | Nam Jeong-im | | |
