= Lady Hong =

- Theatrical poster
- Hangul: 미녀홍낭자
- Hanja: 美女紅娘子
- RR: Minyeo Hongnangja
- MR: Minyŏ Hongnangja
- Directed by: Kim Ki-young
- Written by: Kim Yong-jin
- Produced by: Hwang Ui-sik
- Starring: Lee Soon-jae; Moon Hee
- Cinematography: Kim Jae-yeong
- Edited by: Jang Hyeon-su
- Music by: Han Sang-ki
- Distributed by: Saehan Films
- Release date: August 8, 1969
- Country: South Korea
- Language: Korean

Lady Hong (Korean: 미녀홍낭자; RR: Minyeohongnangja) is a 1969 South Korean film directed by Kim Ki-young.

== Plot ==
A man whose fiancée and her family have died, reluctantly marries another woman. When the ghost of his fiancée visits him, he is tempted to join her in matrimony.

== Cast ==
- Lee Soon-jae
- Moon Hee
- Sa Mi-ja

== Bibliography ==
- Choi, Eun-Yeung. "Hong-ran, the Beauty". AsianFilms.Org. Archived from the original on 2004-05-10.
- "Lady Hong the Beauty ( Minyeo Hong Nangja )(1969)". Korean Movie Database (KMDb).
- Minyeo Hong Nang-ja (1969) at IMDb
