= Flame in the Valley =

- Theatrical poster for Flame in the Valley (1967)
- Hangul: 산불
- Hanja: 山불
- RR: Sanbul
- MR: Sanpul
- Directed by: Kim Soo-yong
- Written by: Shin Bong-seung
- Produced by: Kim Tai-soo
- Starring: Shin Young-kyun
- Cinematography: Hong Dong-hyuk
- Edited by: Yu Jae-won
- Music by: Jeong Yoon-joo
- Distributed by: Tae Chang Enterprises Co., Ltd.
- Release date: April 22, 1967
- Running time: 80 minutes
- Country: South Korea
- Language: Korean

Flame in the Valley (Korean: 산불) is a 1967 South Korean film directed by Kim Soo-yong. It was awarded Best Film at the Blue Dragon Film Awards ceremony.

== Synopsis ==
In this melodrama, a man in a village in Jirisan hides a Communist soldier who has sneaked into the area. A widow, finding the soldier in the bamboo grove, visits him and carries on a sexual relationship with him. When she discovers she is pregnant, she commits suicide. When the villagers burn the woods to drive out remaining Communist guerillas, the man who has hidden the soldier perishes in an attempt to rescue him. The drama is based on a novel.

== Cast ==
- Shin Young-kyun
- Ju Jeung-ryu
- Do Kum-bong
- Hwang Jung-seun
- Han Eun-jin
- Kim Jeong-ok
- Jeon Young-ju
- Kim Hyo-jin
- Kim Young-ok
- Ahn In-sook

== Bibliography ==
=== English ===
- "SANBUL". The Complete Index to World Film.
- Sanbul (1967) at IMDb
- "Flame in the Valley ( Sanbul )(1967)". Korean Movie Database.

=== Korean ===
- 산불 (in Korean). Cine21.
- 산불 (1967) (in Korean). Korean Movie Database.
