= Why the Cuckoo Cries =

- Theatrical poster for Why the Cuckoo Cries (1967)
- Hangul: 두견새 우는 사연
- Hanja: 杜鵑새 우는 事緣
- RR: Dugyeonsae uneun sayeon
- MR: Tugyŏnsae unŭn sayŏn
- Directed by: Lee Kyu-woong
- Written by: Lim Hee-jae
- Produced by: Kim Hyeong-geun
- Starring: Kim Ji-mee
- Cinematography: Yang Yeong-gil
- Edited by: Jang Hyeon-su
- Music by: Jeon Jong-kun
- Distributed by: Dae Yang Films Co., Ltd.
- Release date: July 28, 1967
- Country: South Korea
- Language: Korean

Why the Cuckoo Cries (Korean: 두견새 우는 사연) is a 1967 South Korean film directed by Lee Kyu-woong.

== Synopsis ==
A horror melodrama about the daughter of a kisaeng who dies of a broken heart after her boyfriend's father rejects their marriage. The woman's ghost appears to haunt the boyfriend after he marries another woman.

== Cast ==
- Kim Ji-mee
- Shin Seong-il
- Hwang Jung-sun
- Do Kum-bong
- Kim Hyo-jin
- Lee Nak-hoon
- Han Eun-jin
- Jeong Min
- Joo Sun-tae
- Gang Mi-ae
- Ahn In-sook
