= Public Cemetery =

Wolhaui gongdongmyoji
- Directed by: Cheol-hwi Kwon
- Written by: Cheol-hwi Kwon
- Produced by: Cheol-hwi Kwon
- Starring: Geum-bong Do; Hae Hwang; Ae-ran Jeong; Mi-ae Kang
- Cinematography: Jae-yeong Kim
- Edited by: Hyeon-su Jang
- Release date: 1967
- Running time: 87 minutes
- Country: South Korea
- Language: Korean

Public Cemetery is 1967 South Korean horror film. As a horror film, it was an unprecedented success in the box office.

== Plot ==
A mother murders the woman who married her son, only to have her return as a ghost to get revenge.
