= Guests Who Arrived on the Last Train =

- Poster for Guests Who Arrived on the Last Train (1967)
- Hangul: 막차로 온 손님들
- Hanja: 막車로 온 손님들
- RR: Makcharo on sonnimdeul
- MR: Makch'aro on sonnimdŭl
- Directed by: Yu Hyun-mok
- Written by: Lee Sang-hyun; Lee Eun-seong
- Produced by: Seong Dong-ho
- Starring: Lee Soon-jae; Moon Hee
- Cinematography: Min Jeong-sik
- Edited by: Hyeon Dong-chun
- Music by: Han Sang-ki
- Distributed by: Dong Yang Films Co., Ltd.
- Release date: December 14, 1967
- Running time: 104 minutes
- Country: South Korea
- Language: Korean

Guests Who Arrived on the Last Train (Korean: 막차로 온 손님들; RR: Makcharo on sonnimdeul) is a 1967 South Korean drama film directed by Yu Hyun-mok. It was presented at the 6th Panama International Film Festival.

== Synopsis ==
A literary drama about a young man dying of lung cancer and his circle of friends.

== Cast ==
- Lee Soon-jae
- Moon Hee
- Seong Hun
- Nam Jeong-im
- Kim Seong-ok
- Ahn In-sook
- Han Chan-ju
- Jeong Min
- Kim Ung
- Seong So-min
