= Femme Fatale, Jang Hee-bin =

- Theatrical poster
- Hangul: 요화 장희빈
- Hanja: 妖花 張禧嬪
- RR: Yohwa Jang Huibin
- MR: Yohwa Chang Hŭibin
- Directed by: Im Kwon-taek
- Written by: Jang Cheon-ho
- Produced by: Choe Gwan-du; Seong Dong-ho
- Starring: Nam Jeong-im; Shin Seong-il; Tae Hyun-sil
- Cinematography: An Yun-hyeok
- Edited by: Kim Hee-su
- Music by: Kim Yong-hwan
- Production company: Korea Films Co.
- Release date: January 26, 1968
- Running time: 120 minutes
- Country: South Korea
- Language: Korean

Femme Fatale, Jang Hee-bin or Concubine Jang Hui-bin (Korean: 요화 장희빈) is a 1968 South Korean film directed by Im Kwon-taek.

== Plot ==
A concubine, Jang Ok-jung, is made queen by King Sukjong, and plots to drive the old queen into exile. After her plot fails due to the intervention of nobles loyal to the old queen, Jang is enraged and murders her rival. She attempts to assert her influence over Sukjong, but is undone by her ambitions and executed in public.

== Cast ==
- Nam Jeong-im as Jang Hee-bin
- Shin Seong-il as King Sukjong
- Tae Hyun-sil as Queen Inhyeon
- Gang Mun
- Do Kum-bong
- Han Eun-jin
- Jeong Ae-ran
- Heo Jang-kang as Jang Hee-bin's uncle
- Kim Seong-ok
- Bang Su-il
