= List of South Korean films of 1969 =

A list of films produced in South Korea in 1969:

Title	Director	Cast	Genre	Notes
1969
5 Condemned Criminals				
Assassin				
The Devil and the Beauty				
Elegy of Ren	Kim Ki-young			
Hill of Sadness				
I Would Like To Be a Human	Yu Hyun-mok			
Lady Hong	Kim Ki-young			
The Old Jar Craftsman	Choi Ha-won	Hwang Hae	Literary drama	Best Film at Blue Dragon Film Awards
School Excursion	Yu Hyun-mok			
The Thousand-Year Fox	Shin Sang-ok			
Women of the Yi Dynasty	Shin Sang-ok			
You've Made a Mistake; Jalmot Bosyeot-dagu		Nam Jeong-im		
Sun of Young Man; Jeolmeuni-ui Tae-yang		Nam Jeong-im		
The 7th Man; Je7ui Sanai		Nam Jeong-im		
Private Kim; Yug-gun Gimilbyeong		Nam Jeong-im		
Immortal Rivers And Mountains; Mangogangsan		Nam Jeong-im		
Invisible Man; Tumyeong Ingan		Nam Jeong-im		
Barber of Jangmaru Village; Jangmaruchon-ui Ibalsa		Nam Jeong-im		
Kkotnae; Kkotnae		Nam Jeong-im		
Rejected First Love; Amuri Mi-wodo		Nam Jeong-im		
Wild Girl; Yaseongnyeo		Nam Jeong-im		
Women of Yi-Dynasty; Ijo Yeoin Janhogsa		Nam Jeong-im		
The Night of Full Moon; Siboya		Nam Jeong-im		
Vice-President; Bu-gakha		Nam Jeong-im		
Forget-me-not; Mulmangcho		Nam Jeong-im		
Visit of Spy; Jigeumeun Jugeul Ttaega Anida		Nam Jeong-im		
Shanghai Blues; Shanghai Bureuseu		Nam Jeong-im		
March of a Wife; Buin Haengcha		Nam Jeong-im		
Success; Eog-ulhamyeon Chulsehara		Nam Jeong-im		
Starting Point; Sibaljeom		Nam Jeong-im		
Young Women; Jeolmeun Yeoindeul		Nam Jeong-im		
Newly Married; Makdongi Sinhon 10 gaewol		Nam Jeong-im		
Jin and Min; Jug-eodo Joa		Nam Jeong-im		
Jumper Q Jamba Kyu		Nam Jeong-im		
The Last Letter; Majimak Pyeonji		Nam Jeong-im		
A Returned Singer; Doraon Seonchang		Nam Jeong-im		
The Last Left-hander; Majimak Oensonjabi		Nam Jeong-im		
Spring, Spring; Bom Bom		Nam Jeong-im		
Wind; Baram		Nam Jeong-im		
The Second Wife; Huchwidaeg		Nam Jeong-im		
Sword; Pilsal-ui Geom		Nam Jeong-im		
A Plateau; Gowon		Nam Jeong-im		
Under the Roof; Eoneu Jibung Miteseo		Nam Jeong-im		
Three Sisters of House Maid; Singmo Samhyeongje		Nam Jeong-im		
The Man of the Man; Sanai Jung Sanai		Nam Jeong-im		
Beauty in Black Rose Castle; Heugjangmi Seong-ui Minyeo		Nam Jeong-im		
Chunwon Lee Gwang-Su; Chunwon Lee Gwangsu		Nam Jeong-im		
Chaser; Chugyeogja		Nam Jeong-im		
Original Intention; Chosim		Nam Jeong-im		
The Sisters; Idaero Gandahaedo		Nam Jeong-im		
O-Gong-Nyeo Legend; O Gongnyeo-ui Han		Nam Jeong-im		
Women Placed Above Men; Yeoseong Sang-wi Sidae		Nam Jeong-im		
Saint and Witch; Seongnyeo-wa Manyeo		Nam Jeong-im		
New Bride; Sae Saeksi		Nam Jeong-im		
Duel of Midnight; Simya-ui Daegyeol		Nam Jeong-im		
Intruder in Midnight; Simya-ui Nanibja		Nam Jeong-im		
Tomorrow; Naeil-eun Jugeuljirado		Nam Jeong-im		
Black Cordon; Geomeun Bisangseon		Nam Jeong-im		
For Once in Lifetime; Nae Saeng-ae Dan Hanbeon		Nam Jeong-im		
Can't Forget; Mot-ijeo		Nam Jeong-im		
Catching Tigers; Sane Gaya Beomeul Japji		Nam Jeong-im		
Bring Back the Night Once More; Geu Bamiyeo Dasi Hanbeon		Nam Jeong-im		
Ruler of the Underworld; Amheug-ga-ui Jibaeja		Nam Jeong-im		
A Young, Naughty Master; Gaegujang-i Doryeonnim		Nam Jeong-im		
