= List of South Korean films of 1972 =

A list of films produced in South Korea in 1972:

Title	Director	Cast	Genre	Notes
1972
4 O'Clock, 1950				
Adeul dal chaja cheonligil				
A Cattle Seller	Kim Hyo-cheon			
Gate of Woman	Byun Jang-ho			
Insect Woman	Kim Ki-young			
Long Live the Island Frogs	Jung Jin-woo			Entered into the 23rd Berlin International Film Festival
Oyster Village	Jung Jin-woo	Yoon Jeong-hee	Literary drama	Best Film, Blue Dragon Film Awards, entered into the Berlin Film Festival.
Patriotic Martyr An Jung-gun	Joo Dong-jin	Kim Jin-kyu		Best Film at the Grand Bell Awards
Pollen	Ha Kil-jong			
A Shaman's Story	Choi Ha-won			
The Young Teacher	Kim Ki-duk	Yun Se-hie; Shin Sung-il		
Zero Hour				
