= List of South Korean films of 1971 =

A list of films produced in South Korea in 1971:

Title	Director	Cast	Genre	Notes
1971
3 Black Leopards				
The 30-Year Showdown				
Bun-rye's Story	Yu Hyun-mok			
Find the Diamond!				
Five Fighters				
Horror of the Underworld				
War and Human Beings	Shin Sang-ok			
When a Woman Breaks Her Jewel Box	Kim Soo-yong	Hong Se-mi		Best Film at the Blue Dragon Film Awards
Woman of Fire	Kim Ki-young			
The international crime organization Gugje-amsaldan		Nam Jeong-im		
Wild magpie Oelo-un sankkachi		Nam Jeong-im		
Two women pent up with grudge Hanmanh-eun du yeo-in		Nam Jeong-im		
Wear the black gloves Geom-eun janggab-eul kkyeola		Nam Jeong-im		
Horror in the underworld Amheugga-ui gongpo		Nam Jeong-im		
New Year's Soup; Tteoggug		Nam Jeong-im		
Pier Three at Sunset; Hwanghon-ui je3budu		Nam Jeong-im		
The first love Cheosjeong		Nam Jeong-im		
Between You and Me; Dangsingwa na sa-i-e		Nam Jeong-im		
Young Master the Urchin; Gaegujang-i dolyeonnim		Nam Jeong-im		
Little Boss; Kkomasajanggwa yeobiseo		Nam Jeong-im		
Glad to Say Goodbye; Hangboghan ibyeol		Nam Jeong-im		
