= List of South Korean films of 1970 =

A list of films produced in South Korea in 1970:

Title	Director	Cast	Genre	Notes
1970
From Morning to Evening				
Frozen Spring	Jung Jin-woo			
Love and Death				
Nobody Knows	Jang Il-ho	Oh Ju-kyeong, Roh Joo-hyun, Choi In-suk		
Oh My Love				
One-Eyed Mr. Park				
Pilnyeo	Jung So-young			
Special Force				
The 25th Hour in the Underworld; Amheugga-ui 25si		Nam Jeong-im		
Chaser; Mihaengja		Nam Jeong-im		
Goodbye, Tokyo; Gudba-i Donggyeong		Nam Jeong-im		
Escape in the mist Angaesog-ui talchul		Nam Jeong-im		
Agony of Man; Namjaneun goelo-wo		Nam Jeong-im		
My Dear Maria; Salanghaneun Maria		Nam Jeong-im		
Night of Tokyo; Donggyeong-ui bamhaneul		Nam Jeong-im		
Marriage Classroom; Gyeolhongyosil		Nam Jeong-im		
Back Alley No. 5 Dwisgolmog obeonji		Nam Jeong-im		
The Shadow; Geulimja		Nam Jeong-im		
A Dangerous Husband; Wiheomhan nampyeon		Nam Jeong-im		
Miss Chicken; Misseu chondalg		Nam Jeong-im		
A Jolly Fellow; Kwaenam-a		Nam Jeong-im		
Swordsmen From Eight Provinces; Paldogeomgaeg		Nam Jeong-im		
Heartless on Harbor; Hanggumujeong		Nam Jeong-im		
A Man of Honor; Uili-e sanda		Nam Jeong-im		
The Invincible of the Far East; Geugdong-ui mujeogja		Nam Jeong-im		
Rage; Bunno		Nam Jeong-im		
One-eyed Park; Aekkunun Bak		Nam Jeong-im		
Have No Mercy; Neoneun injeongsajeong bojimala		Nam Jeong-im		
An Unwanted Visitor in the Sunset; Seog-yang-ui bulcheonggaeg		Nam Jeong-im		
Why life is so cruel to women Wae yeojaman-i ul-eo-ya hana		Nam Jeong-im		
We wish you a long life, mon and dad! Eomma-appa Olaesase-yo		Nam Jeong-im		
Mistress; Manim		Nam Jeong-im		
Female Soldiers from All the Provinces; Paldo-yeogun		Nam Jeong-im		
Treason; Moban		Nam Jeong-im		
Dolsoi, a Man of Loyalty; Uili-ui sana-i Dolsoe		Nam Jeong-im		
Love in the Snowfield; Seol-won-ui jeong		Nam Jeong-im		
Friendship of Hope; Nae-il-issneun ujeong		Nam Jeong-im		
