= Chang Mi-hee =

South Korean actress (born 1958)

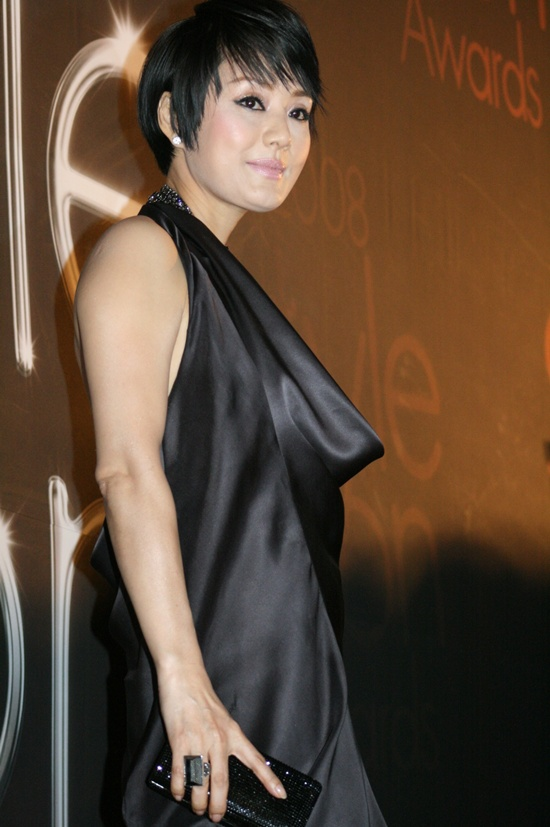
- Chang in October 2008
- Born: 1958 (age 67–68); Seoul, South Korea
- Occupation: Actress
- Years active: 1976–present

Korean name
- Hangul: 장미희
- Hanja: 張美姬
- RR: Jang Mihui
- MR: Chang Mihŭi

Chang Mi-hee (Korean: 장미희; born 1958) is a South Korean actress. She was born Lee Yun-hui in Seoul, South Korea. Chang debuted as an actress in 1976 as starring in Seong Chun-hyang jeon directed by Park Tae-won and TBC TV drama, Haenyeo Dang-sil (Sea Woman Dang-sil). Chang was commonly referred to as "New Troika" or "Second Troika" along with her rival actresses, Jeong Yun-hui and Yu Ji-in of the 1970s and 1980s after the "First Troika", Moon Hee, Nam Jeong-im, and Yoon Jeong-hee of the 1960s.

== Filmography ==
=== Film ===
*Note; the whole list is referenced.

Year	English title	Korean title	Role
1976	Seong Chun-Hyang	성춘향전	Seong Chunhyang
1977	Winter Woman	겨울여자	I-hwa
1978	A Seashore Village	갯마을	
1978	The Home of Stars	별들의 고향 (속)	
1979	Night Markets	야시	
1979	The Trumpeter	나팔수	
1979	Neumi	느미	Neumi
1979	Vicious Woman	순악질여사	
1980	The Bird of Fire	불새	
1980	Spring Rain in Winter	겨울에 내리는 봄비	
1980	Colorful Woman	색깔있는 여자	
1980	She Is Something	그 여자 사람잡네	
1980	The Wooden Horse that Went to Sea	바다로 간 목마	
1980	Winter Love	겨울사랑	
1980	Woman I Abandoned II	내가 버린 여자 2	
1981	Three Times Each for Short and Long Ways	세번은 짧게 세번은 길게	
1981	Last Stop	종점	
1981	The Shaolin Drunken Monk	취팔권 광팔권	
1981	Brother Kim Du-han and Brother Sirasoni]	김두한형 시라소니형	
1981	Let's Meet in the Sad Season	슬픈 계절에 만나요	
1981	A Battle Journal	종군수첩	
1981	Whale Island Escapade	고래섬 소동	
1982	Sweet as Honey	꿀맛	
1982	Night of a Sorceress	무녀의 밤	
1982	Lover	애인	
1982	The Swamp of Desire	욕망의 늪	
1982	Idiot in the Forest	숲속의 바보	
1983	The Flower at the Equator	적도의 꽃	
1983	Love and Farewell	사랑 그리고 이별	
1983	Can't Forget the First Love	첫사랑은 못잊어	
1983	Three Days and Three Nights	삼일낮 삼일밤	
1985	Deep Blue Night	깊고 푸른 밤	Jane
1986	Hwang Jin-ie	황진이	
1988	Holy Night	성야	
1989	Country of Fire	불의 나라	Jeong Eun-ha
1991	Death Song	사의 찬미	Yun Sim-deok
1996	Anniquin	애니깽	Guk-hui
1997	Father	아버지	Yeong-sin
2003	Season In the Sun	보리울의 여름	A mother superior
2008	Dream	비몽	Doctor (cameo)
2017	Claire's Camera	클레어의 카메라	Nam Yang-hye

=== Television series ===
This list is incomplete

Year	Title	Role
2000	Mom and Sister	Han Young-sook
2003	A Problem at My Younger Brother's House	Yeon-ji
2004	First Love of a Royal Prince	Cha Mi-hee
2005	That Summer's Typhoon	Jung Mi-ryung
2006	A Woman's Choice	Kim Chang-ok
2008	Mom's Dead Upset	Ko Eun-ah
2010	Life Is Beautiful	Jo Ah-ra
2012	Here Comes Mr. Oh	Jang Baek-ro
2012	Fashion King	Jo Soon-hee
2013	The Eldest	Lee Sil
2014	Cheongdam-dong Scandal	
2014	The Noblesse	Hong Sun-joo
2015	Unkind Ladies	Jang Mo-ran
2016	Madame Antoine: The Love Therapist	Bae Mi-ran
2017	Black Knight: The Man Who Guards Me	Jang Baek-hee
2018	Marry Me Now	Lee Mi-yeon
2022–2023	Three Bold Siblings	Jang Se-ran

== Awards ==
- 1980, the 1st, the Korean Film Critics Awards : Best Actress for Neumi
- 1981, the 17th, Baeksang Arts Awards : Best TV Actress for Eulhwa (KBS, 을화))
- 1983, the 22nd, Grand Bell Awards : Best Actress for Jeokdo-ui kkot (적도의 꽃))
- 1990, the 26th, Baeksang Arts Awards : Best TV Actress for Nation of Fire (불의 나라)
- 1991, the 12th, Blue Dragon Film Awards : Best Actress for Death Song (사의 찬미)
- 1991, the 2nd, Chunsa Film Art Awards : Best Actress for Death Song
- 1992, the 16th, Gold Cinematography Awards : Special Award, Favorite Actress
- 1992, the 30th, Grand Bell Awards : Best Actress for Death Song
- 2008, KBS Drama Awards, Popularity Award for Mom's Dead Upset
- 2008, KBS Drama Awards, Best Couple Award with Kim Yong-gun for Mom's Dead Upset
- 2018 KBS Drama Awards: Top Excellence Award, Actress, Best Couple
- 2023 59th Grand Bell Awards: Lifetime Achievement Award
