= Lee Hwa-si =

South Korean actress (born 1951)

- Born: July 22, 1951; Seoul, South Korea
- Occupation: Actress
- Years active: 1967–present

Korean name
- Hangul: 이경덕
- RR: I Gyeongdeok
- MR: I Kyŏngdŏk

Stage name
- Hangul: 이화시
- Hanja: 李花始
- RR: I Hwasi
- MR: I Hwasi

Lee Hwa-si (born July 22, 1951) is a South Korean actress. While Lee was attending Dongguk University with a major in Korean literature, she was cast to star in Ban Geum-ryeon directed by Kim Ki-young. Lee is commonly referred to as director Kim Ki-young's persona due to her frequent appearances in Kim's films during the 1970s. Lee's acting in Iodo (1977) especially is regarded as a good example to present her own character. But later, Lee's career declined and Lee retired.

== Filmography ==
*Note; the whole list is referenced.

Year	English title	Korean title	Romanization	Role	Director
2009	A Blind River		Gwihyang		
2007	Never Forever		Du Beonjjae Sarang		
1981	Ban Geum-ryeon		Ban Geumryeon		Kim Ki-young
1980	Not for the World		I sesang dajunda haedo		
1980	Magnificent Experience		Hwalyeohan gyeongheom		
1979	Water Lady		Sunyeo		Kim Ki-young
1979	The Woman Who Leaves Work in the Morning		Achim-e toegeunhaneun yeoja		
1979	Neu-mi		Neumi		Kim Ki-young
1978	Peasants		Heulg		Kim Ki-young
1978	A Woman After a Killer Butterfly		Sal-innabileul jjochneun yeoja		Kim Ki-young
1977	I-eoh Island		I-eodo		Kim Ki-young
1976	Love of Blood Relations		Hyeol-yug-ae		
1974	Transgression		Pagye		
