= List of South Korean films of 1979 =

A list of films produced in South Korea in 1979:

Title	Director	Cast	Genre	Notes
1979
12 Boarders				
26x365=0				
Barmaid				
Byeongtae and Youngja	Ha Kil-jong			
Eul-hwa	Byun Jang-ho			
The Genealogy	Im Kwon-taek	Joo Seon-tae		
The Last Word Left By My Fellow Soldier	Im Won-se			
The Man I Ditched	Jung So-young			
Police Story	Lee Doo-yong	Jang Dong-he		Best Film at the Grand Bell Awards
The Rain at Night	Park Chul-soo			
Rainy Days	Yu Hyun-mok			
Red Gate to Tragedy				
Water Lady	Kim Ki-young	Kim Ja-ok; Lee Hwa-si		
Wild Ginseng	Jung Jin-woo			
Uyoil 우요일; U-yo-il		Jeong Yun-hui		
City Hunter 도시의 사냥꾼; Dosi-ui sanyangkkun		Jeong Yun-hui		
When Love Blossoms 사랑이 깊어질 때 Salang-i gip-eojil ttae		Jeong Yun-hui		
Under an Umbrella 가을비 우산속에; Ga-eulbi usansog-e		Jeong Yun-hui		
The Sleep Deeper Than Death 죽음보다 깊은 잠 Jug-eumboda gip-eun jam		Jeong Yun-hui		
