= List of South Korean films of 1980 =

A list of films produced in South Korea in 1980:

English/Korean Title	Director	Cast	Genre	Notes
1980
30 Day Picnic				
Aegwon				
Barefoot from Pyongyang	Nam Gi-nam			
Does the Cuckoo Sing At Night?	Jung Jin-woo			
A Fine, Windy Day	Lee Jang-ho			
Hate But Once More '80				
The Hidden Hero	Im Kwon-taek	Hah Myung-joong	Anti-communist	Best Film at the Grand Bell Awards
I've Sacrificed Everything				
Neumi	Kim Ki-young	Chang Mi-hee; Hah Myung-joong		
Painful Maturity	Park Chul-soo	Yun Sang-mi		
The Hut	Lee Doo-yong			
Pursuit of Death	Im Kwon-taek			
Son of Man	Yu Hyun-mok			Best Film at the Grand Bell Awards
Wooden Horse Goes to Sea				
Does Cuckoo Cry at Night 뻐꾸기도 밤에 우는가; Ppeokkugido bam-e uneunga		Jeong Yun-hui		
Mrs. Kangbyun 강변부인; Gangbyeonbu-in		Jeong Yun-hui		
The Last Witness 최후의 증인; Choehu-ui jeung-in		Jeong Yun-hui		
Woman I Abandoned II 내가 버린 여자 2 Naega beolin yeoja 2bu		Jeong Yun-hui		
