= List of South Korean films of 1982 =

A list of films produced in South Korea in 1982:

English/Korean Title	Director	Cast	Genre	Notes
1982
26x365=0 II			Romance	
Abenko Green Berets				
Aegwon 2				
Ban Geum-ryeon	Kim Ki-young	Lee Hwa-si; Shin Seong-il		
Come Unto Down	Lee Jang-ho	Lee Yeong-ho		Best Film at Grand Bell Awards and Baeksang Arts Awards
Dracula in a Coffin	Lee Hyeong-pyo	Ken Christopher		
Free Woman	Kim Ki-young	Ahn So-young; Shin Seong-il		
Jackie vs. Bruce to the Rescue		Tong Lung, Jackie Chang	Kung Fu / Adventure / Comedy	
Madame Aema	Jeong In-yeop	Ahn So-young	Ero	
Mountain Strawberries	Kim Su-hyeong	Ahn So-young	Ero	
Passion in the 13th Month				
People In a Slum	Bae Chang-ho			
Physical Love				
The Seagull of Pale Plumage	Jung Jin-woo			
Village in the Mist 안개마을; Angemaeul	Im Kwon-taek	Jeong Yun-hui		
Woman of Fire '82	Kim Ki-young			
The Heart Is a Lonely Hunter 마음은 외로운 사냥꾼; Maeumeun oerowun sanyangkkun		Jeong Yun-hui		
A Woman's Trap 여자의 함정; Yeoja-ui hamjeong		Jeong Yun-hui		
Mistress 정부; Jeongbu		Jeong Yun-hui		
Jin-ah's Rose Eaten By Bugs 진아의 벌레먹은 장미; Jin-a-ui beolremeokeun jangmi		Jeong Yun-hui		
The Woman and Rain 여자와 비 Yeoja-wa bi		Jeong Yun-hui		
Chun-hi 춘희; Chunhui		Jeong Yun-hui		
Abengo Airborne Corps 아벤고 공수군단; Abengo gongsugundan		Jeong Yun-hui		
