= Potato (disambiguation) =

A potato, Solanum tuberosum, is a tuberous food crop grown throughout the world.

Potato may also refer to:

== Places ==
- Potato Lake, a lake in Minnesota
- Potato Patch, an unincorporated community in Arizona
- Potato Patches, an agricultural settlement in Tristan da Cunha

== Art, entertainment, and media ==
=== Fictional entities ===
- Elena Potato, fictional Monster Allergy series character
- Potato, fictional Air novel character
- Potato, a main character from the kid's show, Chip and Potato

=== Films and television ===
- "Potato" (Blackadder), television episode from BBC sitcom Blackadder II
- "The Potato" (The Amazing World of Gumball), an episode of the British-American animated series The Amazing World of Gumball
- "Potatoes" (Shrinking), a 2023 television episode
- Potato (film), a Korean film
- The Potato Venture, a Finnish film
- Potato (production company), a British TV production company
- Story from Croatia, A Croatian film alternatively known as Idaho Potato

=== Other art, entertainment, and media ===
- Potato (band), a Thai rock group
- Mr. Potato Head, a doll

== Other uses ==
- Irish potato candy, a Philadelphia confectionery that resembles a potato
- Potato starch, starch refined from potato
- Potato, a pro wrestling term for a strike to the head which makes real contact
- Sweet potato, another kind of vegetable
- Slang for a computer considered obsolete, slow, or otherwise unoptimized (see Wiktionary:potato#Noun)

== See also ==
- Potoooooooo (Pot-8-Os), an 18th-century racehorse
