= Kim Ja-ok =

South Korean actress (1951–2014)

- Kim in 2014
- Born: October 11, 1951; Busan, South Korea
- Died: November 16, 2014 (aged 63); Seoul, South Korea
- Occupation: Actress
- Height: 1.56 m (5 ft 1 1/2 in)

Korean name
- Hangul: 김자옥
- Hanja: 金慈玉
- RR: Gim Jaok
- MR: Kim Chaok

Kim Ja-ok (Korean: 김자옥; October 11, 1951 – November 16, 2014) was a South Korean actress. Kim was born in Busan in 1951. Kim dropped out of Hanyang University majoring in Film. Kim started her acting career after admitted to a public recruit by MBC TV. During the early period of the 1970s, she mainly starred in TV series, while in the late 1970s, Kim focused on film. Kim gained a popularity for her cheerful depiction on a woman of the new generation such as Sinbu ilgi (신부일기). Her last husband was singer, Oh Seung Geun. Her brother was announcer, Kim Tae Ok.

On November 16, 2014, it was reported by Yonhap News that Kim Ja-ok had died from lung cancer.

== Filmography ==
*Note; the whole list is referenced.

=== Films ===
Year	English title	Other Known Title	Romanization	Role	Director
1976	Common Woman	A Common Woman	Botong-yeoja		Byun Jang-ho
1978	Miss O's Apartment	Miss Oh's Apartment	O-yang-ui Apateu	Oh Mi-yeong	Byun Jang-ho
1978	Yeong-ah's Confession		Yeonga-ui gobaeg		Byun Jang-ho
1978	Scar	Wound	Sangcheo	Ha-young	Ki Kim
1978	Killer Butterfly	A Woman After a Killer Butterfly	Salin nabireul jjonneun yeoja		Ki-young Kim
1978	Man on Top of a Roof		Jibung-wi-ui namja		Park Nam-Su
1979	Water Lady	Woman of Water	Sunyeo (Susyeo)		Ki-young Kim
1979	Miss O's Apartment Part 2	Miss Oh's Apartment Part 2	O-yang-ui Apateu 2	Mi-yeong	Byun Jang-ho
1979	Riding a Wooden Horse	The Woman on the Ferris Wheel	Mogma-wi-ui yeoja		Eung-cheon Kim
1979	Under an Umbrella	Rainy Day in Autumn	Ga-eulbi usansog-e		
1979	The Woman Who Stole the Sun		Tae-yang-eul humchin yeoja		
1979	Red Gate of Tragedy		Bilyeon-ui hongsalmun		
1980	She Is Something	An Awful Woman	Geu yeoja salamjabne		
1980	The Woman of Tuesday Night	Tuesday Night's Woman	Hwa-yo-ilbam-ui yeoja		
1980	One Night at a Strange Place	One Night in an Unfamiliar Place	Nachseon gos-eseo halusbam		
1981	Not for the World	An Unhappy Life	I sesang dajunda haedo		
1981	Lovable You	You Whom I Cannot Hate	Mi-wohal su eobsneun neo		
1988	Reality		Daemul		
1989	Wake Up The Dawn		Saebeok-oeul Kkaewuriroda		
1995	Secret		Biseol		
2003	My Tutor Friend	Tutoring a Student of the Same Age	DongGabnaegi Gwaoe-hagi	Su-wan's Mother	Kim Kyeong-hyeong
2005	Jenny, Juno		Jeni, Juno	Jenny's Mother	Kim Ho-jun
2009	Descendants of Hong Gil Dong	The Righteous Thief	Hongkildongui Huye	Seok Myeong-Ae	Jeong Yong-Ki
2013	Nobody's Daughter Haewon		Nugu-ui ttal-do anin Haewon	Jin-joo (Haewon's Mother)	Hong Sang-soo

=== Television series ===
Year	English title	Romanization	Role	Director
1980	Terminal Point			
1991	The Royal Way	Wang Do	Queen Jeongsun	Kim Jae Hyung
1994	Last Lovers	Majimak Yeonin		So Won Young
1996	Jo Gwang Jo			Uhm Ki Baek
1997	Sea of Ambition	Yongmangui Bada	Yeo Jin (Kyung Ho's Aunt)	Uhm Ki Baek
1999	Springtime	Chungchoon		Choi Yoon Suk
1999	The Boss	Wang Cho (Wang Jo)		Jang Yong Woo
1999	Tomato		Se Ra's Mother	Jang Ki Hong
1999	Rising Sun, Rising Moon	Hae tteu go Dal tteu go	Yoon Ji's Mother	Park Chan Hong, Hwang Eui Kyung
2000	Wang Rung's Land	Wang rung ei Dae ji	Gyo Ha Daek	Lee Jong Han
2000	More Than Words Can Say	Jot eun geol Eo tteok hae	Yeo Nam Sook (Jang Soo's Mother)	Kim Yong Kyu
2001	How Should I Be?	Eojjeomyeon Joha	Gong Hee Joo (Ri & Jin's Mother)	Yoo Jung Joon
2001	The Merchant	Sangdo	Mi Geum's Mother	Lee Byung-hoon
2001	This is Love		Jang Keum Nan (Hoon Sook's Mother)	Moon Bo Hyun, Jin Hyung Wook
2003	On the Prairie	Jeo Pu-reun Cho-won-wi-e	Bang Ok Hee (Tae Woong's Mother)	Park Chan Hong
2003	Escape From Unemployment	Baek su tal chul	Kim Ki Ok	Oh Se Kang
2003	Cats on the Roof	Ok-tap-bang Go-yang-ee	Kim Soon Duk (Jung Eun's Mother)	Kim Sa Hyun
2003	One Million Roses	Baekmansongi Jangmi	Jo Mal Bong (Yu Jin's Mother)	Moon Bo Hyun, Park Man Young
2003	Apgujeong House	Apgujeong Jonggatjip (Apgujeong Jonggajip)	Mother	Kim Yong Jae
2004	Ms. Kim's Million Dollar Quest	Paranmanjang Miseu Kim 10 Eok Mandeulgi		Jang Ki-Hong, Lee Min Chul
2004	Count of Myeongdong	Myeongdong Baekjak	Lee Hwa Ryong's sister	Lee Chang Yong, Nam Nae Won, Park Ho Kyung]
2005	Be Strong, Geum-soon!		Son Jung-sim (Geum-soon's Mother-in-Law)	Lee Dae-young
2005	Bad Housewife	Bul-lyang Joo-boo	Park Ok Ja (Mi Na's Mother)	Yoo In Shik, Jang Tae Yoo]
2005	My Lovely Sam Soon		Park Bong-sook (Sam Soon's Mother)	Kim Yoon-cheol
2006	The Invisible Man	Tumyeongingan Choe Jang Su	Kang Sook Ja	Jung Hae Ryong
2006	My Beloved Sister	Noona / Nuna	Gun Woo's Mother	Oh Kyung Hoon
2007	Heaven & Earth	Haneul Mankeum Ddang Mankeum	Ahn Hye-kyung (Eun-joo & Eun-ha's Mother)	Moon Bo-hyun
2007	Several Questions That Make Us Happy	Woorereul Haengbok Hake Myeot Kaji Chilmun	Yeong-Wook	Jun-ki Seong, Hong Seok-Ku, Yong-su Kim
2007	Coffee Prince	Keopipeurinseu 1 Hojeom	Han-kyul's Mother	Lee Yoon-jung
2007	Kimcheed Radish Cubes	ggak-du-gi	Choi Ji Sook	Kwon Suk Jang
2007	Evasive Inquiry Agency		(cameo)	Ham Young Hoon, Hwang In Hyuk, Lee Hyun Duk
2007	Four Gold Chasers	Eolreong Ddungddang Hong Shin So		Ham Yeong-Hun, Hwang In-Hyuk
2008	Single Dad in Love	Singgeul Papaneun Yeolaejung	Jung Eun Ji (Hyun Ki's Mother)	Moon Bo Hyun
2008	Working Mom	Woking Mam	Kim Bok-sil	Oh Jong-rok
2008	Worlds Within	Geudeuli Saneun Sesang	Park Soo-jin (actress)	Pyo Min-soo, Kim Kyu-tae
2009	The Accidental Couple	Geujeo Bara Bodaga	Director Yoon's First Love (cameo)	Ki Min-soo
2009	High Kick Through the Roof	Jibungttulgo Haikik	Kim Ja-ok	Kim Byung Wook, Kim Young Ki, Jo Chan Joo
2010	Mom is Pretty Too	Eommado Yeppeuda	Lee Soon Jin	Uhm Ki Baek
2011	Ojakgyo Family	Ojakgyo hyeongjaedeul	Park Bok-ja (Tae-sik & Tae Pil's Mother)	Ki Min-soo
2011	Can't Lose	Jigoneun Motsal-a	Hong Geum Ji	Lee Jae Dong
2012	Tasty Life	Matittneun Insaeng		Woon Goon-Il
2013	Thrice Married Woman	Sebeon Gyeolhonhaneun Yeoja	Madam Son (Joon-goo's Mother)	Son Jung-hyun

== Album discography ==
- Princess is Lonely (1996)

== Awards ==
- 1975 11th Baeksang Arts Awards : Best TV Actress (수선화 MBC)
- 1975 11th Baeksang Arts Awards : Most Popular TV Actress
- 1976 12th Baeksang Arts Awards : Best Film Actress (보통여자(김수현의 보통여자))
- 1979 15th Baeksang Arts Awards : Best Film Actress (목마위의 여자)
- 2011 KBS Drama Awards : Excellence Award, Actress in a Serial Drama (Ojakgyo Family)
- 2014 MBC Drama Awards : Achievement Award
- 2014 SBS Drama Awards : Lifetime Achievement Award
- 2014 KBS Drama Awards : Achievement Award
