= Jung Ae-ri =

South Korean actress (born 1960)

- Born: August 11, 1960 (age 66); Muryeong-ri, Yeonggwang-eup, Yeonggwang County, South Jeolla Province, South Korea
- Other name: Chung Ae-rie
- Occupation: Actress
- Years active: 1978–present
- Spouse: Park Jeong-joon (m. 1985; div. 2005) Ji Seung-ryong (m. 2011)
- Children: 1

Korean name
- Hangul: 정애리
- Hanja: 鄭愛利
- RR: Jeong Aeri
- MR: Chŏng Aeri

Jung Ae-ri (Korean: 정애리; born August 11, 1960) is a South Korean actress.

== Career ==
Jung Ae-ri made her acting debut after she was chosen at the KBS talent audition in 1978. In 1980, she moved to another network, MBC. She rose to stardom in the 1984 drama Love and Truth, for which she won the Daesang ("Grand Prize") at the MBC Drama Awards and Best TV Actress at the Baeksang Arts Awards. After she got married in 1985, she immigrated to the United States and temporarily retired from acting. She returned to Korea in 1988 and resumed her career. Jung has since had a prolific career and remains active on television.

In 1997, she received much acclaim for a local stage production of A Streetcar Named Desire, including the Best Actress award at the Seoul Theater Festival. Jung was again praised for 2010's The Most Beautiful Goodbye in the World (also known as The Most Beautiful Farewell), a stage remake of Noh Hee-kyung's 1996 TV series. One review called her performance "stirring" and "incendiary," and that "it transcends the trite plot and elevates it above its television predecessor. Her portrayal is one that resonates long after the curtains are drawn."

== Other activities ==
In 2007, the Inter-Parliamentarians for Social Service honored Jung for giving aid as a sponsor to starving children in Korea and overseas. She has been particularly active in her volunteer work in orphanages since 1989.

== Personal life ==
After 20 years of marriage, Jung and her first husband divorced in 2005. They have one daughter, Ji-hyun. Jung remarried in 2011 to Ji Seung-ryong, a businessman who studied theology at Yonsei University.

== Filmography ==
=== Television series ===
| Year | Title | Role |
|---|---|---|
| 2025-2026 | Marie and Her Three Daddies | Eom Gi-bun |
| 2025 | Would You Marry Me? | Joo Pil-nyeon |
| 2023 | Delightfully Deceitful | Shin Seo-ra |
| 2022 | Rose Mansion | Charlie's mother |
| 2021 | Mouse | Choi Young-Shin |
| 2021 | Snowdrop | Choi Soo-ryeon |
| 2019 | Queen: Love and War | Great Queen Min |
| 2019 | Crash Landing on You | Kim Yoon-hee |
| 2019 | The Secret Life of My Secretary | Sim Hae-ra |
| 2019 | VIP | Han Sook-Young |
| 2018 | My Healing Love | Heo Song-Joo |
| 2018 | Sky Castle | Madame Yoon |
| 2018 | Something in the Rain | Gyu-Min's mother (cameo) |
| 2017 | Reverse | Yeo Hyang-Mi |
| 2017 | Temperature of Love | Park Mi-Na |
| 2016 | Good Person | Cha Seung-Hee (ep.1-40) |
| 2015 | Beautiful You | Jo Young-Sun |
| 2015 | The Man in the Mask | Im Ji-sook |
| 2015 | My Heart Twinkle Twinkle | Kang Sung-sook |
| 2015 | The Village: Achiara's Secret | Yoon Ji-Sook's Mother |
| 2014 | Run, Jang-mi | Mrs. Hong |
| 2014 | Golden Cross | Oh Geum-shil |
| 2014 | Angel Eyes | Oh Young-ji |
| 2014 | KBS TV Novel: "Land of Gold" | Madam Sewoondang |
| 2013 | Ruby Ring | Yoo Gil-ja |
| 2013 | KBS Drama Special: "Like a Fairytale" | Jang-mi's mother |
| 2012 | Glass Mask | Shim Hae-soon |
| 2012 | Can't Live Without You | Min Jae-hee |
| 2012 | Welcome Rain to My Life | Ryu Ji-sun |
| 2012 | I Remember You | Kang-soo's mother |
| 2011 | Kimchi Family | Jung Hyun-sook |
| 2011 | Just You | Oh Bong-ja |
| 2011 | You're So Pretty | Na Myung-ja |
| 2010 | Thank You for Making Me Smile | Ji-hye's mother |
| 2010 | Smile Again | Hong Hye-sook |
| 2010 | The King of Legend | Soseono |
| 2010 | Your Heaven | Young-sook |
| 2010 | Blossom Sisters | Yoon Sun-hee |
| 2010 | Stars Falling from the Sky | Lee Min-kyung |
| 2009 | Can't Stop Now | Im Bong-ja |
| 2009 | Good Job, Good Job | Jung Soo-hee |
| 2009 | HDTV Lietrature: "Sister's Menopause" | Eun-sook |
| 2008 | Temptation of Wife | Min Hyun-joo |
| 2008 | Women in the Sun | Choi Jung-hee |
| 2008 | You Are My Destiny | Oh Young-sook |
| 2007 | Eight Days, Assassination Attempts against King Jeongjo | Lady Hyegyeong |
| 2007 | Even So Love | Ms. Jo |
| 2007 | Conspiracy in the Court | Queen Mother (Daebi) |
| 2007 | Flowers for My Life | Madam Gong |
| 2007 | Heaven & Earth | Park Myung-ja |
| 2006 | Goodbye Solo | Park Kyung-hye |
| 2006 | Love and Ambition | mother of Tae-joon's brother |
| 2005 | Only You | Yoon Hee-jin |
| 2005 | HDTV Literature: "The Post Horse Curse" | Yeokma |
| 2004 | Immortal Admiral Yi Sun-sin | Yi Sun-sin's mother Ms. Byun |
| 2004 | Lovers in Paris | Han Ki-hye |
| 2004 | Lotus Flower Fairy | Won So-jung |
| 2003 | Sang Doo! Let's Go to School | Gong Shim-ran |
| 2001 | Soon-ja | Hwang Seung-ri |
| 2000 | It's Half | Byun Jae-ran |
| 1999 | The Clinic for Married Couples: Love and War | Associate Judge (1999–2009) |
| 1998 | The Era of the Three Kims | Lee Hee-ho's woman |
| 1998 | Eun-ah's Daughter | Lee Hye-won |
| 1997 | Devotion | |
| 1997 | MBC Best Theater | Kyung-ha |
| 1996 | Temptation | Shin-ae |
| 1995 | Road | Shin Min-jung |
| 1995 | Ground Rumble | Kim Jeong-ho's wife Ms. Heo |
| 1995 | Aunt Jade | |
| 1994 | In Front of History | Lee Nam-deok |
| 1994 | The Matchstick Girl | Kang Se-hee |
| 1993 | Woman's Mirror | Myung-ae |
| 1992 | Desperate Man | |
| 1992 | Mystery Trilogy: "Searching for the First Sailboat" | Sook-mi |
| 1991 | MBC Best Theater: "The Neighbor's Eun | Yoo-jung |
| 1991 | MBC Best Theater: "Dream of Seoul" | Lee Ji-won |
| 1991 | Flowers That Never Wilt | Yoo Seok-woo |
| 1991 | The Close Peak | Yoon-hee |
| 1991 | Thief's Wife | Soo-ja |
| 1990 | December 24, 1990 Snowfall | Kyung-joo |
| 1990 | The Rose of Betrayal | Seo Ji-hyun |
| 1989 | The Sleepless Tree | Oh Seung-hye |
| 1988 | Joy of Love | |
| 1985 | MBC Best Theater: "Laughter" | |
| 1984 | Love and Truth | Lee Hyo-sun |
| 1983 | MBC Best Theater: "White Man" | |
| 1983 | Fire of Fate | Ki-ja |
| 1983 | Father and Son | Hye-sook |
| 1983 | I'm Back | |
| 1982 | Can't Forget | |
| 1982 | Confession | |
| 1981 | Dad's Beard | |
| 1981 | Let's Love | |
| 1981 | Longest Summer | |
| 1981 | Burning Bridges | Colonel Choi Kang-shik's wife |
| 1981 | 1st Republic | Kim Soo-im |
| 1981 | Hello | |
| 1980 | Concentric | Second Daughter |
| 1980 | People on The Cliff | |
| 1979 | Jeongseon Arirang | |
| 1979 | Set in the Lake Reman | Ha Ma-ri |
| 1979 | Any Girl | |
| 1979 | Wild Goose | Min Ji-hee |
| 1978 | Saint Julia | Julia |
| 1978 | Pasque Flower | |
| 1978 | B Dormitory Matron and Love Letter | |

=== Films ===
| Year | English title | Korean title | Romanization | Role | Director |
|---|---|---|---|---|---|
| 2012 | Circle of Crime | 비정한 도시 | Bijeonghan Dosi | | Kim Mun-heum |
| 2012 | Han Gyungjik | 한경직 | Han Gyeongjik | documentary narrator | Chun Jeong-hoon |
| 2010 | Hakuna Matata - A Story of Jirani | 하쿠나 마타타 - 지라니 이야기 | Hakuna Matata - Jirani Iyagi | documentary narrator | Lee Chang-kyu |
| 2006 | Fly High | 사랑하니까, 괜찮아 | Ssarang-hanikka Gwen-chana | Mi-hyun's mother Young-eun | Kwak Ji-kyoon |
| 2000 | Libera Me | 리베라 메 | Libera Mae | Jung Myung-jin (cameo) | Yang Yun-ho |
| 1982 | Stray Dog | 들개 | Deul-gae | | Park Chul-soo |
| 1980 | Three Women Under the Umbrella | 우산속의 세여자 | Usansog-ui se yeo... | | Lee Doo-yong |

=== Theater ===
| Year | English title | Korean title | Romanization | Role |
|---|---|---|---|---|
| 2010 | The Most Beautiful Farewell | 세상에서 가장 아름다운 이별 | Sesangyeseo Gajang Ahreumdawoon Ilbyeon | In-hee |
| 1997 | A Streetcar Named Desire | 욕망이라는 이름의 마차 | | Blanche DuBois |
| 1997 | Royal Theatre | 로열씨어터 | | |

== Bibliography ==
| Year | English title | Korean title | Romanization |
|---|---|---|---|
| 2020 | | 채우지 않아도 삶에 스며드는 축복 | |
| 2005 | | 사람은 버리는 게 아니잖아요 | |

== Awards ==
| Year | Award | Category | Nominated work |
|---|---|---|---|
| 2010 | 3rd Korea Sharing Awards | 국회상임위원장상 | |
| 2009 | MBC Drama Awards | Golden Acting Award, Veteran Actress | Good Job, Good Job, Can't Stop Now |
| 2009 | 28th Sejong Culture Awards | 통일외교부문상 | |
| 2007 | Inter-Parliamentarians for Social Service | Special Volunteer Award | |
| 2005 | KBS Entertainment Awards | Achievement Award | The Clinic for Married Couples: Love and War |
| 2003 | KBS Drama Awards | Best Actress in a Comic Role | Sang Doo! Let's Go to School |
| 1997 | 21st Seoul Theater Festival | Best Actress | A Streetcar Named Desire, Royal Theatre |
| 1985 | 21st Baeksang Arts Awards | Best TV Actress | Love and Truth |
| 1984 | MBC Drama Awards | Grand Prize (Daesang) | Love and Truth |
| 1981 | 17th Baeksang Arts Awards | Best New TV Actress | Set in the Lake Reman |
| 1976 | Ewha Womans University Dance Competition | 1st Place in Modern dance | |
