= List of South Korean films of 1981 =

A list of films produced in South Korea in 1981:

English/Korean Title	Director	Cast	Genre	Notes
1981
Barmaid Number 0				
Be Patient, Young Lady				
Come Low Unto Us	Lee Jang-ho			
A Girl Who Has Gone to the City	Kim Soo-yong			
Goodbye, Dad				
Guerilla at the Philippines 인사야투; Insa yasu	Yeong-sun Kwon, Noli Villar	Hui-yeong Kang, Kook Jeong-hwan, Tae-jeong Kim, Jess Lapid Jr., Azenith Briones, Marissa Del Mar, Dante Rivero, Romano Kristoff	Action, War	South Korea & Philippines co-production
A Horse Carriage in Winter	Jung So-young			
Invited People	Choi Ha-won	Yu In-chon	Religious drama	Best Film at the Grand Bell Awards
Madame Freedom '81	Park Ho-tae	Yoon Jeong-hee; Choi Mu-ryong		
Mandala	Im Kwon-taek	Ahn Sung-ki		
Parrot Sang with Her Own Body				
The People in Dark Streets	Lee Jang-ho			
Shorter Three Times, Longer Three Times	Kim Ho-sun			
A Small Ball Shot by a Midget	Lee Won-se			
Suddenly at Midnight	Ko Young-nam	Kim Young-ae		
Hitman in the Hand of Buddha	Hwang Jang Lee	Hwang Jang Lee	Martial Arts	
Miss, Please Be Patient 아가씨 참으세요; Agassi cham-euse-yo		Lung Tong, Jeong Yun-hui	Martial Arts / Crime / Drama	
The One I Love 사랑하는 사람아; Salanghaneun salam-a		Jeong Yun-hui		
Parrot Cries with Its Body 앵무새 몸으로 울었다; Aengmusae mom-eulo ul-eossda		Jeong Yun-hui		
Revenge of the Ghost; Hannyo	Lee You Sub	Choi Suk, Lim Chung Ha	Horror	
