= Touch me not =

Touch me not is a common name for two unrelated groups of plants:

- Several species in the genus Impatiens (family Balsaminaceae)
- Mimosa pudica (family Fabaceae)

== Other uses ==
- A Touch-Me-Not (Bongseonhwa), a 1956 South Korean film directed by Kim Ki-young
- Touch Me Not (Nu mă atinge), a 2018 film that won the Golden Bear at the Berlinale Berlin Film Festival
- The biblical Latin phrase Noli me tangere which appears in John 20:17 can be translated as "Touch me not"
- Touch Me Not (TV series), a 2025 Indian television series directed by Ramana Teja
