= Iodo =

Iodo may refer to:

- Socotra Rock, in the East China Sea
- Iodo (film), 1977 South Korean film directed by Kim Ki-young
- Iodine, chemical element, especially as functional group or ligand
