= Oyster Village =

- Theatrical poster
- Hangul: 석화촌
- Hanja: 石花村
- RR: Seokhwachon
- MR: Sŏkhwach'on
- Directed by: Jung Jin-woo
- Written by: Moon Yang-hoon; Na Yeon-sook; Na Bong-han
- Based on: Oyster Village by Lee Cheong-jun
- Produced by: Jung Jin-woo
- Starring: Yoon Jeong-hee
- Cinematography: Park Seung-bae
- Edited by: Kim Hee-soo
- Music by: Han Sang-ki
- Distributed by: Woo Jin Films Co., Ltd.
- Release date: March 22, 1972
- Running time: 96 minutes
- Country: South Korea
- Language: Korean

Oyster Village (Korean: 석화촌) is a 1972 South Korean drama film directed by Jung Jin-woo. It was awarded Best Film at the Blue Dragon Film Awards ceremony and was nominated for the Golden Bear at the 22nd Berlin International Film Festival.

== Plot ==
In an island village that makes its living from oyster fishing, the villagers believe that a dead person's soul cannot go to heaven until another person has died. After Byol-Rye's father drowns, her mother kills herself. Byol-Rye then marries a sickly man on the condition that his father helps Byol-Rye's mother go to heaven. Based on a novel.

== Cast ==
- Yoon Jeong-hee
- Kim Hee-ra
- Yoon Il-bong
- Yoon In-Ja
- Kim Sin-jae

== Bibliography ==
- "SEOKHWACHON". The Complete Index to World Film. Archived from the original on 2012-09-08.
- 석화촌. Cine21 (in Korean).
