= List of South Korean films of 1978 =

This is a list of South Korean films of 1978.

Title	Director	Cast	Genre	Notes
1978
Arirang Ah!				
Crocodile				
Diary of Korean-Japanese War	Jang Il-ho	Kim Jin-kyu		Best Film at the Grand Bell Awards
Do You Know Kkotsun?	Jung In-yeop			
The Guest in Room 7				
Killer Butterfly	Kim Ki-young			
Miss O's Apartment	Byun Jang-ho			
Peasants	Kim Ki-young			
Rainshower	Ko Young-nam			
A Widow	Cho Moon-jin			
The Woman I Ditched	Jung So-young			
Do You Know Kotsuni? 꽃순이를 아시나요; Kkochsun-ileul asina-yo		Jeong Yun-hui		
I Am Lady Number 77 나는 77번 아가씨; Naneun 77beon agassi		Jeong Yun-hui		
