= Love of Blood Relations =

- Theatrical poster
- Hangul: 혈육애
- Hanja: 血肉愛
- RR: Hyeoryugae
- MR: Hyŏryugae
- Directed by: Kim Ki-young
- Written by: Kim Yong-jin
- Produced by: Kang Dae-jin
- Starring: Lee Hwa-si; Kim Won-seop
- Cinematography: Chung Kwang-suk
- Edited by: Hyeon Dong-chun
- Music by: Han Sang-ki
- Distributed by: Samyeong Films
- Release date: October 5, 1976
- Running time: 125 minutes
- Country: South Korea
- Language: Korean

Love of Blood Relations (Korean: 혈육애) is a 1976 South Korean film directed by Kim Ki-young. When the South Korean government pressured Kim to make an anti-Communist film, he responded with this film. By focusing on a femme fatale from North Korea, Kim was able to transcend the propagandistic origins to make a characteristically personal work.

== Plot ==
Based on a novel by Kim Won-dae, the film is an anti-Communist melodrama in which personal affairs affect international relations between North and South Korea and Japan.

== Cast ==
- Lee Hwa-si
- Kim Won-seop
- Choi Bool-am
- Jeon Yang-ja
- Hyeon Seok
- Jo Jae-seong
- Park Am
- Park Gyu-chae
- Joo Sun-tae
- Han Eun-jin

== Awards ==
The award for best art direction was given to Kim Seong-bae at the Grand Bell Awards.
