= Kwon Mi-hae =

South Korean actress (born 1950)

Kwon Mi-hae (also Kwon Mi-hye and Gwon Mi-hye; born c. 1950) is a South Korean former film and television actress. She was one of the first professional voice actresses in the country and is known for starring in Kim Ki-young's Iodo, and The Deaf Worker.

== Early life ==
Kwon Mi-Hae was born to poor farmers at the beginning of the Korean War. She couldn't afford school and learned to read and write Korean by singing hymns at church. Kwon worked packing medicine at a pharmacy and attended night school. She eventually audited courses at Hanyang University, where she met Lee Cheol-hyang, whom she would later marry. (Lee's 1970 series Mistress which he wrote became a hit.)

== Career ==
When Dong-A Broadcasting System held its first auditions, Kwon passed all seven rounds and became one of the first professional voice actresses in the South Korea. Kwon's first script was a translation of Tarzan, where she voiced Jane.

After its first national television station, KBS (Korean Broadcasting System) was founded in 1961, and the station aired South Korea's first television series in 1962. Their commercial competitor, Tongyang Broadcasting (TBC), had a more aggressive program policy and aired controversial dramas. In the 1960s, television sets had been of limited availability, but in the 1970s, they started to spread among the general population. Dramas evolved from portraying dramatic historical figures to introducing national heroes like Yi Sun-sin or Sejong the Great. Contemporary series dealt with personal sufferings, such as Kim Soo-hyun's influential Stepmother (새엄마, Saeeomma), aired by MBC in 1972 and 1973. In 1973, Kwon was among the first actresses to land leading roles in major K-dramas, including Kim Ki-young's Iodo (1977), which played at the 28th Berlin International Film Festival, and The Deaf Worker (1980). The next decade she starred in Seoul Ddukbaegi (1990), and the 1995 TV series Friday's Lady.

== Personal life and family ==
Kwon hosted private dinners for industry colleagues, actors like Lee Soon-jae, and television executives, people like fashion designer André Kim and a former Miss Korea. In the Aughts, Lee Cheol-hyang died in a car accident, and Kwon was left with very little by her alcoholic husband. She sold her belongings to move to the U.S. to live with her son and his family in the Virginia suburbs.

Kwon's granddaughter is American magazine writer Vivien Lee.

She currently forbids being photographed.
