= The Hidden Hero =

- Theatrical poster for The Hidden Hero (1980)
- Hangul: 깃발없는 기수
- Hanja: 깃발없는 旗手
- RR: Gitbal eomneun gisu
- MR: Kippal ŏmnŭn kisu
- Directed by: Im Kwon-taek
- Written by: Seon Woo-hui
- Produced by: Park Chong-chan
- Starring: Hah Myung-joong
- Cinematography: Lee Suck-ki
- Edited by: Kim Hee-su
- Music by: Gang Seok-hui
- Distributed by: Hwa Chun Trading Co.
- Release date: September 4, 1980
- Running time: 96 minutes
- Country: South Korea
- Language: Korean

The Hidden Hero (Korean: 깃발없는 기수) is a 1980 South Korean film directed by Im Kwon-taek. It was chosen as Best Film at the Grand Bell Awards.

== Synopsis ==
An anti-communist film about a reporter torn between political ideologies during the days after the Korean liberation from Japan.

== Cast ==
- Hah Myung-joong
- Kim Young-ae
- Go Doo-shim
- Song Jae-ho
- Joo Hyun
- Yoon Yang-ha
- Kim Hee-ra
- Lee Ill-woong
- Lee Jong-man
- Park Am

== Bibliography ==
- Gitbaleobtneun gisu (1980) at IMDb
- "No Glory (Gisbal-eobneun gisu)(1979)". Korean Movie Database.
- "GITBAL OBNUN GISU". The Complete Index to World Film.
- 깃발없는 기수 (in Korean). Cine21.

== Notes ==
Preceded by Police Story	Grand Bell Awards for Best Film; 1979	Succeeded by Son of Man
