= The Student Boarder =

- Poster for The Student Boarder (1966)
- Hangul: 하숙생
- Hanja: 下宿生
- RR: Hasuksaeng
- MR: Hasuksaeng
- Directed by: Jung Jin-woo
- Written by: Shin Bong-Seung
- Produced by: U Gi-dong
- Starring: Shin Seong-il; Kim Ji-mee
- Cinematography: Lyou Jae-hyoung; Ahn Sang-il
- Edited by: Kim Hee-su
- Music by: Kim Yong-hwan
- Distributed by: Se Ki Corporation
- Release date: June 30, 1966
- Running time: 104 minutes
- Country: South Korea
- Language: Korean

The Student Boarder (Korean: 하숙생) is a 1966 South Korean film directed by Jung Jin-woo. It was presented at the 27th Venice International Film Festival.

== Synopsis ==
This melodrama is about a man whose girlfriend leaves him for another man after his face is disfigured. He has plastic surgery, then tracks down his old girlfriend to make her regret her past actions.

== Bibliography ==
- Hasugsaeng (1966) at IMDb
- "A Student Boarder (Hasuksaeng) (1966)". KMDb Korean Movie Database.
