= List of South Korean films of 1983 =

A list of films produced in South Korea in 1983:

English/Korean Title	Director	Cast	Genre	Notes
1983
Born on February 30				
Dance of a Widow	Lee Jang-ho			
Daughter of the Flames	Im Kwon-taek			
Declaration of Fools	Lee Jang-ho			
Flowers at the Equator	Bae Chang-ho			
Hotel at 0 Hour				
Jealousy 질투; Jiltu		Jeong Yun-hui		
A Man From Pyongyang	Nam Ki-nam			
Memories of 21				
My Love 사랑하는 사람아 (속); Sequel, "Saranghaneun saram-a sok"		Jeong Yun-hui		
Promised Woman 약속한 여자; Yaksokhan yeoja		Jeong Yun-hui		
Savior of the Earth 콤퓨터핵전함, 폭파대작전 Computer haekjonham popka daekjakjeon	Su-yong Jeong		Animation, Sci-fi	
Stray Dogs	Park Cheol-su	Chung Ae-rie, Jeong Han-yong		
Tinker Wife 땜장이 아내; Ttamjang-i a-nae		Jeong Yun-hui		
Village in the Mist	Im Kwon-taek			
Wife				
