= Son of Man (1980 film) =

- Poster for Son of Man (1980)
- Hangul: 사람의 아들
- RR: Saramui adeul
- MR: Saramŭi adŭl
- Directed by: Yu Hyun-mok
- Screenplay by: Hong Pa
- Based on: Son of Man by Yi Munyeol
- Produced by: Kwak Jeong-hwan
- Starring: Hah Myung-joong; Lee Soon-jae
- Cinematography: Jung Il-sung
- Edited by: Ree Kyoung-ja
- Music by: Han Sang-ki
- Distributed by: Hap Dong Films Co., Ltd.
- Release date: September 24, 1980
- Running time: 110 minutes
- Country: South Korea
- Language: Korean

Son of Man (Korean: 사람의 아들; RR: Saramui adeul) is a 1980 South Korean drama film directed by Yu Hyun-mok. It is based on the same titled 1979 novel written by Yi Munyeol.

== Synopsis ==
A detective searching for the cause of a young man's death uncovers a melodramatic story involving prostitutes and religion.

== Cast ==
- Hah Myung-joong
- Lee Soon-jae
- Joo Sun-tae
- Oh Su-mi
- Oh Mi-yeon
- Kim Yun-mi
- Hwang Jung-seun
- Do Kum-bong
- Park Am
- Kim Seok-hun

== Awards ==
- Grand Bell Awards (1980), Best Film

== Bibliography ==
- Salamui adeul (1980) at IMDb
- "Son of a Man (Salam-ui adeul)(1980)". Korean Movie Database.

Preceded by The Hidden Hero	Grand Bell Awards for Best Film; 1980	Succeeded by Invited People
