= Lee Nak-hoon =

South Korean actor (1936–1998)

- Born: March 27, 1936; Keijō, Korea, Empire of Japan
- Died: October 7, 1998 (aged 62)
- Occupation: Actor

Korean name
- Hangul: 이낙훈
- Hanja: 李樂薰
- RR: I Nakhun
- MR: I Nakhun

Lee Nak-hoon (Korean: 이낙훈; March 27, 1936 – October 7, 1998) was a South Korean actor. Lee earned a fame for his characteristic and mature acting.

== Biography ==
Lee Nak-hoon was born in Keijō, Korea, Empire of Japan in 1936. After graduation from Kyunggi High School in 1956, Lee studied Aesthetics at Seoul National University. When he finished his second year of the study, Lee went to the United States to history at Miami University.

Lee starred in over 800 drama series, and 80 plays. Lee translated and introduced the popular US TV series, The Six Million Dollar Man and Columbo to the South Korean public. Lee also served as a member of the National Assembly from 1981 to 1985.

Lee married Choe Yeong-bok (최영복) and had one son and daughter with her. Lee died of heart disease and diabetes in 1998.

== Filmography ==
*Note; the whole list is referenced.

Year	English title	Korean title	Romanization	Role	Director
	Mugoonghwa-Korean National Flower		Mugunghwakkoch-i pi-eoss-eumnida		
	Watercolors in Rain 2, The Zelkova Hill		Bi-oneun nal suchaehwa 2, neutinamu-ui eondeog		
	Love and Tears		Salanggwa nunmul		
	Korean Connection		Koli-an keonegsyeon		
	That Which Falls Has Wings		ChurakHaneunGeoseun-Nalgaega-Issda		
	Inchon	인천	Incheon		
	End of the Wild Days		Chug chonggagjol-eob		
	Portrait of a Rock		Dol-ui chosang		
	The Trumpeter		Napalsu		
	The Loneliness of the Journey		Yeosu		
	The Panmunjom Poplar Operation		Panmunjeom milyunamu jagjeon		
	The Stone Bell		Doljong		
	Special Investigator Bat		Teugbyeolsusaban bagjwi		
	Murder With Ax In Pan Moon Jeom		Panmunjeom dokkisal-in		
	Immoral Man		Bae Deokja		
	Tell I ?		Malhaebeolilkka		
	Cops For Violent Crime		Ganglyeoggye		
	Great Counterattack of King-Kong		Kingkong-ui dae-yeogseub		
	If You Cry, You Will Be A Fool		Ulmyeon babo-ya		
	The Last Embrace		Majimag po-ong		
	True Love For Wife		Aecheo-ilgi		
	A Spy Remaining Behind		anlyucheobja		
	Lovers		Yeon-indeul		
	Remodelled Beauty		Jeonghyeongmi-in		
	Nasang		Nasang		
	An Executioner		Mangnani		
	2nights 3days		2bag 3il		
	Excellent Guys		Meosjin sana-ideul		
	Snowy Night		Seol-ya		
	A Lodger's Life		Hasug-insaeng		
	Don't Forget Love Although We Say Goodbye		He-eojyeodo salangman-eun		
	Drum Sound of Sae Nam Teo		Saenamteo-ui bugsoli		
	Voices		Mogsoli		
	The Wedding Ring		Gyeolhonbanji		
	When We Meet Again		Mannabwado jigeum-eun		
	Darling, I'm Sorry		Anae-yeo mi-anhada		
	My Wife		Nae anae-yeo		
	Big Shot Bridegroom		Daegamsinlang		
	His Double Life		Miseu Li		
	The Golden Eagle		Hwanggeumdogsuli		
	Bachelor in Trouble		Malsseongnan chonggag		
	East and West		Donggwa seo		
	Tomorrow's Scenery of Korea		episode 3		
	Deulgae		Deulgae		
	Sad No More		Seulpeum-eul oemyeonhal ttae		
	Quick as Lightning		Beongaegat-eun sana-i		
	Great King Sejo		Sejodae-wang		
	The Good Father-in-law		Hal-abeojineun meosjaeng-i		
	What's the Use of Crying		Ulgineun wae ul-eo		
	Woman with Long Eyelashes		Sognunseob-i gin yeoja		
	Why Life Is So Cruel To Women		Wae yeojaman-i ul-eo-ya hana		
	The Last Song of Hope		Jeolm-eun adeul-ui majimag nolae		
	An Abandoned Woman		Beolimbad-eun yeoja		
	Nobody Knows		Amudo moleuge		
	Pagoda of No Shadow		Mu-yeongtab		
	Minbi and Magic Sword		Minbi-wa mageom		
	Escape in the Mist		Angaesog-ui talchul		
	A Young, Naughty Master		Gaegujang-i Doryeonnim		
	Barber of Jangmaru Village		Jangmaruchon-ui Ibalsa		
	Escaping Shanghai		Sanghae Talchul		
	Duel of Midnight		Simya-ui Daegyeol		
	Singing Fair		Norae Haneun Bangnamhoe		
	Leave Your Heart		Ddeonado Maeummaneun		
	Parking Lot		Juchajang		
	Spring, Spring		Bom Bom		
	A Wonderer in Myeong-dong		Myeong-dong Nageune		
	Under the Roof		Eoneu Jibung Miteseo		
	Three Sisters of House Maid		Singmo Samhyeongje		
	Sons-in-Law		Paldo Sa-wi		
	Destiny of My Load		Jeonha Eodiro Gasinaikka		
	Kkotnae		Kkotnae		
	Gentleman from the Hell		Ji-ogeseo On Sinsa		
	Rebirth		Jaesaeng		
	Until That Day		Neujeodo Geunalkkaji		
	Mrs. Wonnim		Wonnimdaeg		
	Bun-nyeo		Bun-nyeo		
	Sweetheart		Jeongdeun nim		
	A Wandering Swordsman and 108 Bars of Gold		Nageune Geomgaek Hwanggeum 108 Gwan		
	A Police Note		Hyeongsa Sucheop		
	Happy Youth		Jeulgeoun Cheongchun		
	No Grudge after Death		Jugeodo Haneun Eopda		
	Dreams of Sora		Soraui Ggum		
	Secret Order		Milmyeong		
	Princess Guseul		Guseul Gongju		
	Flowers Over the Country		Gangsane Kkochi Pine		
1968	Desire		Galmang		
	The Crossroads of Hell		Jiogui Sipjaro		
	Prince Yang-nyeong		Bangrangdaegun		
	Secret of Affection		Mojeongui Bimil		
	Remarriage		Jaehon		
	Cloisonne Ring		Chilbo Banji		
	Blue Light, Red Light		Cheongdeung Hongdeung		
	Lonely Marriage Night		Doksugongbang		
	Mr. Gu at Sajik Village		Sajikgol Guseobang		
	Blues of the Twilight		Hwanghon-ui Bureuseu		
	Your Name		Geudae Ireumeun		
	Fallen Leaves		Nagyeop		
	A Devoted Love		Sunaebo		
	United Front		Yeonhapjeonseon		
	Gang Myeong-hwa		Gang Myeong-hwa		
	Soil		Heuk		
	A Teacher in an Island		Seommaeul Seonsaeng		
	A Secret Royal Inspector		Amhaeng-eosa		
	The King's First Love		Imgeumnimui Cheotsarang		
	A Madame		Anbangmanim		
	I Want to Go		Gagopa		
	The Queen of Elegy		Ellejiui Yeowang		
	Sorrowful Youth		Cheongchun Geukjang		
	Original Sin		Wonjoe		
	Mist		Angae		
	Three Swordsmen of Iljimae		Iljimae Samgeomgaeg		
	A Misty Grassland		Angaekkin Chowon		
	One Second before Explosion		Pokbal Ilchojeon		
	Man from the South, Woman from the North		Namnam Buknyeo		
	Why a Cuckoo Cries		Dugyeonsae Uneun Sayeon		
	Madame Jet		Jeteu Buin		
	Mother		Chinjeong Eomeoni		
	The Sun Rises Again		Taeyangeun Dasi Tteunda		
	The Seaside Village		Gaenma-eul		
	Courage is Alive		Yongsaneun Sara Itda		

== Awards ==
- 1978, the 14th Baeksang Arts Awards : Best TV Actor (천녀화)
- 1992, the 28th Baeksang Arts Awards : Best TV Actor (옛날의 금잔디, KBS)
