= Jeong Yun-hui =

South Korean former actress (born 1954)

- Portrait of Jeong
- Born: June 4, 1954 (age 72); Tongyeong, South Korea
- Occupation: Actress
- Years active: 1976–1984

Korean name
- Hangul: 정윤희
- Hanja: 鄭允姬
- RR: Jeong Yunhui
- MR: Chŏng Yunhŭi

Jeong Yun-hui (Korean: 정윤희; born June 4, 1954) is a former South Korean actress active since 1975. She was born in Tongyeong, a southwestern coastal city of South Gyeongsang Province, South Korea in 1954. After graduation from Hyehwa Girls' High School, Jeong debuted as an actress in 1975 as starring in Yokmang directed by Lee Gyeong-tae. Jeong was commonly referred to as one of the "New Troika" or "Second Troika" along with her rival actresses, Chang Mi-hee and Yu Ji-in of the 1970s and 1980s after the "First Troika", Moon Hee, Nam Jeong-im, and Yoon Jeong-hee of the 1960s.

== Filmography ==
*Note; the whole list is referenced.

Year	English title	Korean title	Romanization	Role	Director
1984	Love Song	사랑의 찬가	Salang-ui changa		
1984	The Companion	동반자	Dongbanja		
1984	My Love 3	사랑하는 사람아 제3부	Salanghaneun salam-a 3		
1983	Tinker Wife	땜장이 아내	Ttamjang-i a-nae		
1983	Jealousy	질투	Jiltu		
1983	Promised Woman	약속한 여자	Yaksokhan yeoja		
1983	My Love	사랑하는 사람아 (속)	Sequel, Saranghaneun saram-a sok		
1982	The Heart Is a Lonely Hunter	마음은 외로운 사냥꾼	Maeumeun oerowun sanyangkkun		
1982	A Woman's Trap	여자의 함정	Yeoja-ui hamjeong		
1982	Mistress	정부	Jeongbu		
1982	Jin-ah's Rose Eaten By Bugs	진아의 벌레먹은 장미	Jin-a-ui beolremeokeun jangmi		
1982	The Woman and Rain	여자와 비	Yeoja-wa bi		
1982	Chun-hi	춘희	Chunhui		
1982	Village of Haze	안개마을	Angemaeul		
1982	Abengo Airborne Corps	아벤고 공수군단	Abengo gongsugundan		
1981	Miss, Please Be Patient	아가씨 참으세요	Agassi cham-euse-yo		
1981	The One I Love	사랑하는 사람아	Salanghaneun salam-a		
1981	Parrot Cries with Its Body	앵무새 몸으로 울었다	Aengmusae mom-eulo ul-eossda		
1980	Does Cuckoo Cry at Night	뻐꾸기도 밤에 우는가	Ppeokkugido bam-e uneunga		
1980	Mrs. Kangbyun	강변부인	Gangbyeonbu-in		
1980	The Last Witness	최후의 증인	Choehu-ui jeung-in		
1980	Woman I Abandoned II	내가 버린 여자 2	Naega beolin yeoja 2bu		
1979	Uyoil	우요일	U-yo-il		
1979	City Hunter	도시의 사냥꾼	Dosi-ui sanyangkkun		
1979	When Love Blossoms	사랑이 깊어질 때	Salang-i gip-eojil ttae		
1979	Under an Umbrella	가을비 우산속에	Ga-eulbi usansog-e		
1979	The Sleep Deeper Than Death	죽음보다 깊은 잠	Jug-eumboda gip-eun jam		
1978	Do You Know Kotsuni?	꽃순이를 아시나요	Kkochsun-ileul asina-yo		
1978	I Am Lady Number 77	나는 77번 아가씨	Naneun 77beon agassi		
1977	Japanese Invasion in the Year of Imjin and Gye Wol-hyang	임진란과 계월향(임진왜란과 계월향)	Imjinlangwa Gye Wolhyang		
1977	High School Champ	고교 우량아	Gogyo ulyang-a		
1977	Mischief's Marching Song	얄개행진곡	Yalgaehaengjingog		
1977	Yalkae, a Joker in High School				
1976	Blood Relations	핏줄	Pitjul		
1976	Rocking Horse and a Girl	목마와 숙녀	Mogma-wa sugnyeo		
1975	Story of the Youth	청춘극장	Cheongchungeugjang		
1975	Lust	욕망	Yogmang		

== Awards ==
- 1982, the 18th, Baeksang Arts Awards : Best Film Actress for Parrot Cries with Its Body (앵무새 몸으로 울었다)
- 1981, the 20th, Grand Bell Awards : Best Actress for Parrot Cries with Its Body
- 1981, the 17th, Baeksang Arts Awards : Best TV Actress for The One I Love (사랑하는 사람아)
- 1980, the 19th, Grand Bell Awards : Best Actress for Does Cuckoo Cry at Night (뻐꾸기도 밤에 우는가)
