= Lee Jang-ho's Baseball Team =

- Film poster
- Hangul: 이장호의 외인구단
- RR: I Janghoui oein gudan
- MR: I Changhoŭi oein kudan
- Directed by: Lee Jang-ho
- Written by: Chi Sang-hak
- Based on: Alien Baseball Team by Lee Hyun-se
- Produced by: Lee Jang-ho
- Starring: Ahn Sung-ki; Lee Bo-hee; Choi Jae-sung
- Cinematography: Park Seung-bae
- Edited by: Hyeon Dong-chun
- Music by: Jeong Sung-jo
- Distributed by: Pan Film
- Release date: August 2, 1986 (South Korea)
- Running time: 125 minutes
- Country: South Korea
- Language: Korean

Lee Jang-ho's Baseball Team (Korean: 이장호의 외인구단) is a 1986 South Korean sports comedy drama film based on Lee Hyun-se's comic Alien Baseball Team.

== Plot ==
Hye-sung grew up poor but he has a gifted talent for baseball. Eom-ji has watched over him since they were young. Hye-sung falls in love with Eom-ji but when she transfers to another school, they don't see each other for years. Hye-sung and Eom-ji meet again at a baseball field but she is now the girlfriend of the exceptional hitter of high school, Ma Dong-tak. Hye-sung competes endlessly with Dong-tak over Eom-ji. But he ends up with a serious shoulder injury and gives up baseball. Then baseball manager Sohn Byung-ho gathers up dismissed baseball players and forms a team. Manager Sohn puts his team through extreme training and Hye-sung returns to the baseball world. He competes once more with Dong-tak, who has Eom-ji by his side.

== Cast ==
- Ahn Sung-ki as Hye-sung
- Lee Bo-hee as Eom-ji
- Choi Jae-sung as Ma Dong-tak
- Maeng Sang-hoon
- Kwon Young-woon
- Shin Chung-shik
- Park Jung-ja
- Park Am
