= The Old Jar Craftsman =

- Theatrical poster for The Old Jar Craftsman (1969)
- Hangul: 독짓는 늙은이
- RR: Dokjinneun neulgeuni
- MR: Tokchinnŭn nŭlgŭni
- Directed by: Choi Ha-won
- Written by: Yeo Su-jong; Shin Bong-seung
- Produced by: Lee Jong-byeok
- Starring: Hwang Hae
- Cinematography: You Young-gil
- Edited by: Hyeon Dong-chun
- Music by: Choi Chang-kwon
- Distributed by: Dong Yang Films Co., Ltd.
- Release date: March 4, 1969
- Running time: 95 minutes
- Country: South Korea
- Language: Korean

The Old Jar Craftsman (Korean: 독짓는 늙은이) aka Old Man Making a Jar is a 1969 South Korean drama film directed by Choi Ha-won. It was awarded Best Film at the Blue Dragon Film Awards ceremony. The film was selected as the South Korean entry for the Best Foreign Language Film at the 42nd Academy Awards, but was not accepted as a nominee.

== Plot ==
A lonely old man who makes a living as a potter saves the life of a young woman. The two marry and have a son. The woman's old lover finds her, and she runs away with him. The old potter commits suicide. Years later, the woman, now a beggar, returns to her old home and visits her son at the old potter's grave. Based on a novel.

== Cast ==
- Hwang Hae
- Yoon Jeong-hee
- Namkoong Won
- Heo Jang-kang
- Kim Jung-hoon
- Kim Hee-ra
- Kim Jeong-ok
- Choe Bong
- Kim So-jo
- Jeon Shook

== See also ==
- List of submissions to the 42nd Academy Awards for Best Foreign Language Film
- List of South Korean submissions for the Academy Award for Best Foreign Language Film

== Bibliography ==
=== English ===
- "DOK JITAUN NULGURI". The Complete Index to World Film].
- Dokjitneun neulgeuni (1969) at IMDb
- "An Old Potter ( Dok Jinneun Neulgeuni )(1969)". Korean Movie Database (KMDb).

=== Korean ===
- 독짓는 늙은이 (in Korean). cine21.com].
- 독짓는 늙은이 (1969) (in Korean). Korean Movie Database (KMDb).
