= Invited People =

- Theatrical poster for Invited People (1981)
- Hangul: 초대받은 성웅들 - 초대받은 사람들
- Hanja: 招待받은 聖雄들 - 招待받은 사람들
- RR: Chodaebadeun seongungdeul - chodaebadeun saramdeul
- MR: Ch'odaebadŭn sŏngungdŭl - ch'odaebadŭn saramdŭl
- Directed by: Choi Ha-won
- Written by: Choi Ha-won
- Produced by: Choe Chun-ji
- Starring: Yu In-chon; Kim Seong-su; Yoon Yang-ha; Kim Min-kyoung; Kwak Eun-kyung
- Cinematography: Yang Yeong-gil
- Edited by: Park Deok-yeol
- Music by: Choi Chang-kwon
- Distributed by: Yun Bang Films Co., Ltd.
- Release date: October 21, 1981
- Running time: 135 minutes
- Country: South Korea
- Language: Korean

Invited People (Korean: 초대받은 성웅들 - 초대받은 사람들) is a 1981 South Korean film directed by Choi Ha-won. It was chosen as Best Film at the Grand Bell Awards.

== Plot ==
A religious drama about people studying and practising Catholicism in Korea during the 1830s despite oppression and persecution, half a century since the faith arrived in the peninsula in 1784.

== Cast ==
- Yu In-chon
- Kim Seong-su
- Yoon Yang-ha
- Kim Min-kyoung
- Kwak Eun-kyung
- Oh Young-hwa
- Kim Ae-kyung
- Moon Mi-bong
- Yoon Il-ju
- Lee In-ock

== Bibliography ==
- Chodaebadeun saramdeul (1981) at IMDb
- "Invited Saints (Chodaebadeun seongwungdeul)(1984)". KMDb Korean Movie Database.
- "CHODAEBADEUN SARAMDEUL". The Complete Index to World Film.
- 초대받은 성웅들 (in Korean). Cine21.

== Notes ==
Preceded by Son of Man	Grand Bell Awards for Best Film; 1981	Succeeded by Come Unto Down
