= Police Story (1979 film) =

- Theatrical poster for Police Story (1979)
- Hangul: 경찰관
- Hanja: 警察官
- RR: Gyeongchalgwan
- MR: Kyŏngch'algwan
- Directed by: Lee Doo-yong
- Written by: Lee Moon-woong
- Produced by: Kwak Jeong-hwan
- Starring: Jang Dong-he
- Cinematography: Son Hyun-chae
- Edited by: Lee Kyung-ja
- Music by: Kim Hee-kap
- Distributed by: HapDong Films
- Release date: October 5, 1979
- Running time: 100 minutes
- Country: South Korea
- Language: Korean

Police Story (Korean: 경찰관) is a 1979 South Korean drama film directed by Lee Doo-yong. It was chosen as Best Film at the Grand Bell Awards.

== Plot ==
A melodrama about a man who chooses the career of a police officer in spite of his girlfriend's objection and social stigma. After he is injured in the line of duty, he and his girlfriend get married.

== Cast ==
- Jang Dong-he
- Han So-ryong
- Yu Ji-in
- Moon Jung-suk
- Do Kum-bong
- Bang Su-il
- Sin Mu-il
- Kim Young-in
- Han Kug-nam
- Choe Jae-ho

== Bibliography ==
- "Gyeongchal-gwan". The Complete Index to World Film. Archived from the original on 2012-04-06.
- 경찰관. Cine21 (in Korean).

Preceded by Diary of Korean-Japanese War	Grand Bell Awards for Best Film; 1978	Succeeded by The Hidden Hero
