= Madame Freedom =

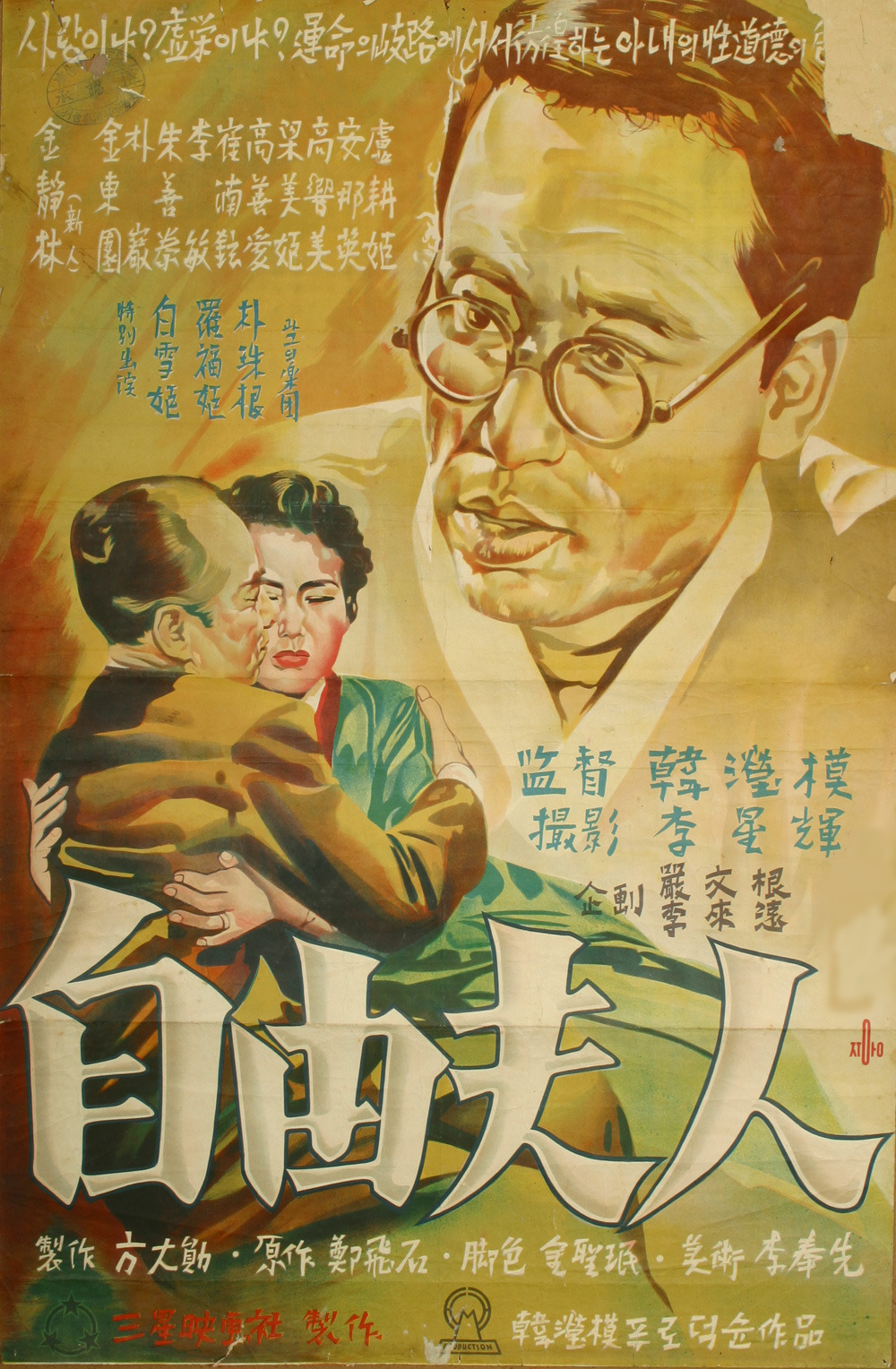
- Poster for Madame Freedom (1956)
- Hangul: 자유부인
- Hanja: 自由夫人
- RR: Jayubuin
- MR: Chayubuin
- Directed by: Han Hyung-mo
- Written by: Kim Seong-Min; Lee Cheong-gi
- Produced by: Bang Dae-hun
- Starring: Park Am; Kim Jeong-rim
- Cinematography: Lee Seong-hwi
- Edited by: Han Hyung-mo
- Music by: Kim Yong-hwan
- Distributed by: SamSeong Film
- Release date: June 9, 1956
- Running time: 125 minutes
- Country: South Korea
- Language: Korean

Madame Freedom (Korean: 자유부인) is a 1956 South Korean film.

== Plot ==
The film opens introducing a professor, Jang, and his wife, Oh Seon-yeong, who have a son together. Oh accepts a job at a boutique, as a cosmetics store manager, to supplement her husband's small income as a professor. Their next door neighbor frequently professes his attraction to her, and she allows him to teach her dancing and introduce her to alcohol. Her boss' husband also begins a flirtation with her which escalates to the point of being found by his wife as they are about to consummate their "dating." Meanwhile, her husband faces a strong attraction to a pretty woman in a grammar class he teaches for secretaries, frequently staying out late walking with her, though he resists her request to take matters further. These extramarital dalliances strain the relationship between the couple. Ultimately, Oh's neglect of their son, coupled with anonymous warnings Jang receives about her behavior, culminate in Jang forcing Oh out of the home. Their son insists to be let outside to see his mother, forcing Jang to acquiesce. The film closes with Oh weeping outside the gate, hugging her son.

== Cast ==
- Park Am... Professor Jang
- Kim Jeong-rim... Oh Seon-yeong
- No Gyeong-hui... Choi Yun-ju
- Joo Sun-tae... Baek Seon-saeng
- Kim Dong-won
- Go Hyang-mi
- Yang Mi-yeong... Park Eun-mi
- An Na-yeong
- Go Seon-ae

== Bibliography ==
- Jayu buin (1956) at IMDb
- "Madame Freedom (Ja-yu bu-in)(1956)". KMDb Korean Movie Database.
- Mitchel, Duncan. "Madame Freedom (1956)". koreanfilm.org.
