= Let's Talk About Youth =

- Directed by: Kim Eung-cheon
- Written by: Yu Dong-hun
- Produced by: Ju Dong-jin
- Starring: Choi Min-hie; Kim Hee-ra; Lee Deok-hwa
- Cinematography: Paeng Jeong-mun
- Release date: 11 March 1976
- Running time: 90 minutes
- Country: South Korea
- Language: Korean

Let's Talk About Youth is a 1976 South Korean dramatic film.

== Plot ==
When Sun-a becomes pregnant, she does not know who is the father of her unborn child, and asks Jeong-su to help her care for the baby. She later finds out that Seok-ku is the father and abandons the child. Sun-a and Seok-ku decide to start a new life with the help of Jeong-su.

== Cast ==
- Kim Hee-ra
- Choe Min-hui
- Lee Deok-hwa
- Park Am
- Jeon Shook
- Kim Ung
- Kim Ji-young
