= The Tragedy of Deaf Sam-yong =

1973 film

- Film poster
- Hangul: 비련의 벙어리 삼용
- Hanja: 悲戀의 벙어리 三龍
- RR: Biryeonui beongeori Samyong
- MR: Piryŏnŭi pŏngŏri Samyong
- Directed by: Byun Jang-ho
- Written by: Kim Kang-yun; Na Do-hyang
- Starring: Kim Hee-ra; Yun Yeong-kyeong; Shin Yeong-il; Choi In-suk
- Cinematography: Ahn Chang-bok
- Production company: Woosung Productions
- Release date: 17 November 1973
- Running time: 110 minutes
- Country: South Korea
- Language: Korean

The Tragedy of Deaf Sam-yong (Korean: 비련의 벙어리 삼용, translit. Biryeonui beongeori samyong) is a 1973 South Korean drama film directed by Byun Jang-ho. The film was selected as the South Korean entry for the Best Foreign Language Film at the 46th Academy Awards, but was not accepted as a nominee.

== Cast ==
- Kim Hee-ra
- Yun Yeong-kyeong
- Shin Yeong-il
- Choi In-suk

== See also ==
- List of submissions to the 46th Academy Awards for Best Foreign Language Film
- List of South Korean submissions for the Academy Award for Best Foreign Language Film
