= Yun Il-bong =

South Korean actor (1934–2025)

- Born: 1 March 1934
- Died: 8 December 2025 (aged 91)

Korean name
- Hangul: 윤일봉
- RR: Yun Ilbong
- MR: Yun Ilbong

Yun Il-bong (Korean: 윤일봉; 1 March 1934 – 8 December 2025) was a South Korean actor.

== Life and career ==
Yun was born in Goesan-gun, Chūseihoku Province, Korea, Empire of Japan on 1 March 1934. His first role as a child actor was the "Railway Story" (1947) and "Blue Hill" (1948). Throughout his career, he appeared in over thirty feature films, including Aimless Bullet (1961), Oyster Village (1972) and Suddenly at Midnight (1981).

In 2012, he was awarded the Silver Crown Cultural Medal.

Yun died on 8 December 2025, at the age of 91.
