= Chu Song-woong =

South Korean actor

- Hangul: 추송웅
- Hanja: 秋松雄
- RR: Chu Songung
- MR: Ch'u Songung

Chu Song-Woong (Korean: 추송웅; 9 April 1941 – 29 December 1985) was a South Korean stage actor. He is referred to as a representative actor of the 1970s.

== Early life ==
Che was born in Goseong, Keishōnan-dō, Korea, Empire of Japan. After he graduated from Busan Industrial High School, Chu studied film and theatre at Chung-Ang University.

== Career ==
In 1963, Chu was accepted to Jayu Geukjang (Freedom Theatre), and debuted on the stage with Dalgyal (Eggs). As he established his career as a stage actor, he adopted Franz Kafka's short story A Report to an Academy in 1977 into a mono drama titled Confession of Red Peter (빨간 피터의 고백). Chu took charge of planning, production, stage directing, acting, and makeups. The play was opened at the "3.1 ro Storage Theatre" on August 20, 1977. The drama became a huge hit at that time and attracted 60,000 audiences in the four months, setting the record of the highest audience. The play was a critical starter for booming mono drama in South Korea. In 1980, Chu opened a small theatre named "Salon Theatre Chu" where a Western-style restaurant was housed as well.

Chu won the Best Actor at Dong-A Theatre Awards two times for his acting for Eodiseo mueoti doeeo mannarya (어디서 무엇이 되어 만나랴) in 1971 and (세비야의 이발사) in 1973. Chu also was honored with the Best Stage Actor at Korean Theater and Film Awards for Confession of Red Peter in 1979. Chu appeared in TV drama series. However, Chu suddenly died in 1985. He is survived by his children, actress Chu Sang-mi, musical actor, Chu Sang-rok, and an owner of a theatre, Chu Sang-uk.

== Filmography ==
- Ban Geum-ryeon (Ban Geumryeon; 1981)
- The Door (Mun; 1977)
- I am Looking for a Wife (Yeojaleul chajseubnida; 1976)
- Seven Tomboys (7in-ui malgwallyang-i; 1976)
- Byeong-Tae's Impressive Days (Byeongtae-ui gamgyeogsidae; 1975)
- My Heart is Blue Sky (Ma-eum-eun puleun haneul; 1973)

== Awards ==
- 1971, Dong-A Theatre Awards, Best Actor for Eodiseo mueoti doeeo mannarya
- 1973, Dong-A Theatre Awards, Best Actor for 세비야의 이발사
- 1079, Korean Theater and Film Awards, Best Stage Actor at for Confession of Red Peter
