= Water Lady =

- Poster for Water Lady (1979)
- Hangul: 수녀
- Hanja: 水女
- RR: Sunyeo
- MR: Sunyŏ
- Directed by: Kim Ki-young
- Written by: Kim Ki-young
- Produced by: Kim Ki-young
- Starring: Kim Ja-ok; Lee Hwa-si
- Cinematography: Kim Deok-jin
- Edited by: Hyeon Dong-chun
- Music by: Han Sang-ki
- Distributed by: Shin Han Literary Art Movie Co.
- Release date: April 21, 1979
- Running time: 117 minutes
- Country: South Korea
- Language: Korean

Water Lady (Korean: 수녀; RR: Sunyeo) is a 1979 South Korean film written, produced and directed by Kim Ki-young. In 2019, the film was screened at the 23rd Bucheon International Fantastic Film Festival.

== Plot ==
A literary drama telling the story of Jin-seok, a Korean veteran of the Vietnam War, and his marital life. His wife Sun-ok runs a company that makes goods from bamboo. Her habitual stutter is passed on to their son. Jin-seok has an affair with Chu-wol, a femme fatale who schemes to ruin his family. Jin-seok manages to escape the bad influence of Chu-wol, and his son's stutter is cured.

== Cast ==
- Kim Ja-ok
- Lee Hwa-si
- Kim Chung-chul
- Lee Ill-woong
- Park Am
- Lee Young-ho
- Song Eok
- Yu Sun-cheol
- Ju Il-mong
- Choe Jae-ho

== Bibliography ==
- Lee, Sun-Hwa. "Water Lady". The House of Kim Ki-young. Archived from the original on 2004-05-08.
