= Remodelled Beauty =

- Hangul: 정형미인
- Hanja: 定形美人
- RR: Jeonghyeongmiin
- MR: Chŏnghyŏngmiin
- Directed by: Il-ho Jang
- Written by: Ka Seu Oh; Yeong-il Lee
- Produced by: Ju Dong-jin
- Starring: Jin-su Kim; Ji-in Yu; Nak-hun Lee
- Cinematography: Woon-gyo Jeong
- Release date: 15 March 1975
- Running time: 81 minutes
- Country: South Korea
- Language: Korean

Remodelled Beauty (Korean: 정형미인) is a 1975 South Korean horror film.

== Cast ==
- Lee Nak-hoon
- Yu Ji-in
- Kim Ok-jin
- Kim Jin-su
- Park Am
- Jeong Jin-a
- Choe Sung-kwan
- Kim Yun-suk
- Maeng Hyeon-hui
- Lee Jeong-hwa
