= Beyond the Years =

- Poster
- Hangul: 천년학
- Hanja: 千年鶴
- RR: Cheonnyeonhak
- MR: Ch'ŏnnyŏnhak
- Directed by: Im Kwon-taek
- Written by: Kim Mi-yeong
- Based on: "The Wanderer of Seonhak-dong" by Yi Cheong-jun
- Produced by: Lee Hee-won; Kim Jong-won
- Starring: Cho Jae-hyun; Oh Jung-hae; Oh Seung-eun
- Cinematography: Jeong Il-seong
- Edited by: Park Soon-deok
- Music by: Kunihiko Ryo
- Production company: Kino2
- Distributed by: Prime Entertainment
- Release date: April 12, 2007
- Running time: 106 minutes
- Country: South Korea
- Language: Korean
- Box office: US$902,591

Beyond the Years (Korean: 천년학; RR: Cheonnyeonhak) is a 2007 South Korean drama film. Celebrating director Im Kwon-taek's 100th film, it is based on the short fiction "The Wanderer of Seonhak-dong" by Yi Cheong-jun, and was presented at the 2007 Toronto International Film Festival. Despite being an informal sequel to Im's phenomenally successful Sopyonje (1993), Beyond the Years was not popular with Korean audiences.

== Synopsis ==
Dong-ho and Song-hwa are separately adopted by Yu-bong (Im Jin-taek), a nomadic singer, and grow up as siblings. Dong-ho falls in love with Song-hwa, but he suffers from the fact that he has to call her sister and constantly fight with Yu-bong's obsession to make her a great singer. Eventually, Dong-ho leaves home. However, with his unchanging affection for Song-hwa, he keeps following traces of his love while refining his drumming skills in order to match well with her singing. This is the heart-touching love story of Song-hwa, who devotes her life and love to her talent for Pansori (a traditional Korean form of narrative song), and Dong-ho, who has devoted his life to loving her.

== Cast ==
- Cho Jae-hyun
- Oh Jung-hae
- Ryu Seung-ryong
- Oh Seung-eun
- Im Jin-taek
- Jang Min-ho
- Go Soo-hee
