= Adultery Tree =

1985 film directed by Jung Jin-woo

- Theatrical poster for Adultery Tree (1985)
- Hangul: 자녀목
- Hanja: 恣女木
- RR: Janyeomok
- MR: Chanyŏmok
- Directed by: Jung Jin-woo
- Written by: Chi Sang-hak
- Produced by: Jung Jin-woo
- Starring: Won Mi-kyung
- Cinematography: Lee Seong-chun
- Edited by: Hyeon Dong-chun
- Music by: Han Sang-ki
- Distributed by: Woo Jin Films Co., Ltd.
- Release date: March 1, 1985
- Running time: 125 minutes
- Country: South Korea
- Language: Korean

Adultery Tree (Korean: 자녀목; RR: Janyeomok) is a 1985 South Korean film directed by Jung Jin-woo. It was awarded Best Film at the Grand Bell Awards ceremony.

== Synopsis ==
In this historical drama, the matriarch of an aristocratic family makes the lady Yeon-ji's life miserable due to her inability to bear children. The matriarch brings a surrogate mother into the family, and orders Yeon-ji to kill herself. Yeon-ji hangs herself at the hanging tree used for women who have engaged in adultery.

== Cast ==
- Won Mi-kyung
- Kim Yong-seon
- Park Jung-ja
- Kim Hee-ra
- Jeon Moo-song
- Choe Byeong-geun
- Hong Seong-min
- Lim Hae-lim
- Choe Jae-ho
- Park Jong-sel

Preceded by Mulleya Mulleya	Grand Bell Awards for Best Film; 1984	Succeeded by Mother
