= A Touch-Me-Not =

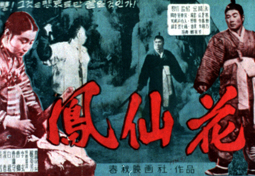
- Korean poster for A Touch-Me-Not (1956)
- Hangul: 봉선화
- Hanja: 鳳仙花
- RR: Bongseonhwa
- MR: Pongsŏnhwa
- Directed by: Kim Ki-young
- Written by: An Hwa-yeong
- Produced by: Kim Ki-young
- Starring: Na Gang-hui; An Seok-jin
- Cinematography: Seo Byeong-hyeon
- Edited by: Kim Ki-young
- Music by: Han Sang-ki
- Distributed by: Kim Ki-Yeong Production
- Release date: November 10, 1956
- Country: South Korea
- Language: Korean

A Touch-Me-Not (Korean: 봉선화) is a 1956 South Korean film directed by Kim Ki-young.

== Synopsis ==
The film is a historical melodrama about a love triangle within a group of bandits.

== Cast ==
- Na Gang-hui
- An Seok-jin
- Beak Song
- Hong Il-hwa
- Ko Seol-bong
- Go Seon-ae
- Park Am
- Lee Hyeon
- Kang Kye-shik
- Jo Hyang

== Bibliography ==
- Berry, Chris. "A Touch-Me-Not". [The House of Kim Ki-young]. Archived from the original on 2004-09-07.
- A Touch-Me-Not (1956) at IMDb
- "A Touch-Me-Not (Bongseonhwa) (1956)". [KMDb Korean Movie Database].
