= Choi Ha-won =

South Korean film director (born 1937)

- Born: 19 August 1937 (age 89)
- Occupations: Film director, screenwriter
- Years active: 1968–1990

Korean name
- Hangul: 최하원
- RR: Choe Hawon
- MR: Ch'oe Hawŏn

Choi Ha-won (Korean: 최하원, born 19 August 1937) is a South Korean film director and screenwriter. He directed 25 films between 1968 and 1990.

== Selected filmography ==
- The Old Jar Craftsman (1969)
- Invited People (1981)
