= Kim Hee-ra =

South Korean actor (born 1947)

- Born: March 23, 1947 (age 79); South Korea
- Occupation: Actor
- Parent: Kim Seung-ho (father)

Korean name
- Hangul: 김희라
- Hanja: 金熙羅
- RR: Gim Huira
- MR: Kim Hŭira

Kim Hee-ra (born March 23, 1947) is a South Korean actor.

== Filmography ==
Year	Title	Role
1969	The Old Jar Craftsman	
1972	Oyster Village	
1973	The Tragedy of Deaf Sam-yong	
1974	The Land	
1976	Let's Talk About Youth	
1980	Lonely Star of Osaka	
1980	Love Me Once Again Despite Hatred '80	
1981	Mrs. Kangbyeon	
1981	Forgive Me Once Again Despite Hatred '80	
1981	Even If You Take Everything	
1981	Children of Darkness Part 1, Young-ae the Songstress	
1981	Let's Meet in the Sad Season	
1982	Abengo Airborne Corps	
1982	People of Kkobang Neighborhood aka People in the Slums	
1982	Night of a Sorceress	
1982	Bird That Cries At Night	
1983	Yong-pal Has Returned	
1983	The Heart Is a Lonely Hunter	
1983	Iron Men	
1983	Daughter of Fire	
1984	Love and Farewell	
1984	The Tiger That Doesn't Cry	
1985	Adultery Tree	
1985	The Oldest Son	
1985	Cabbage in a Pepper Field	
1986	Red Cherry 3	
1986	No Regret	
1986	Seoul Is Cloudy with Rain Showers	
1986	Son of God	
1987	My Bare Feet In The Air	
1987	A Woman Beating the Drum	
1988	Gam-dong	
1988	If You Want	
1990	Rooster	
1990	Dreaming Plant	
1991	Byun Geum-ryun	
1991	The Echo of Love and Death Part 1	
1991	The Echo of Love and Death Part 2	
1992	Byun Geum-ryun 2	
1994	The Eternal Empire	
1994	The Story of Two Women	
1994	Vanished	
1994	Apricot Blossom in Snow for One Born in Seven Months	
1995	The Great Hunter G. J.	
1995	Mom, the Star, and the Sea Anemone	
1998	Tie a Yellow Ribbon	
2006	Bloody Tie	Lee Taek-jo
2006	The Fox Family	Man living in the container
2010	Poetry	Mr. Kang
2012	Star	Chairman (guest)

== Awards and nominations ==
Year	Award	Category	Nominated work	Result
1972	16th Buil Film Awards	Best Actor	Oyster Village	Won
2010	47th Grand Bell Awards	Best Supporting Actor	Poetry	Won
