= Suddenly at Midnight =

- Theatrical poster
- Hangul: 깊은밤 갑자기
- RR: Gipeunbam gapjagi
- MR: Kip'ŭnbam kapchagi
- Directed by: Ko Young-nam
- Screenplay by: Yoon Sam-yook
- Story by: Park Tae-chang
- Produced by: Seo Hyeon
- Starring: Kim Young-ae; Yoon Il-bong; Lee Ki-seon
- Cinematography: Jeong Pil-si
- Edited by: Hyeon Dong-chun
- Music by: Choi Jong-hyuk
- Production companies: Nam-a Pictures Co., Ltd.
- Release date: July 17, 1981
- Running time: 95 minutes
- Country: South Korea
- Language: Korean

Suddenly at Midnight (Korean: 깊은밤 갑자기; RR: Gipeunbam gapjagi; also known as Suddenly in the Dark or Suddenly in Dark Night) is a 1981 South Korean erotic horror thriller film directed by Ko Young-nam. Suddenly at Midnight was the only horror film directed by Ko Young-nam during his extensive filmmaking career.

== Plot ==
Kang Yu-jin, a wealthy biology professor doing a butterfly field study, takes in a new housemaid; the young woman, Mi-ok, is the daughter of a shaman priestess who recently died in a house fire. At first, Yu-jin and his wife, Seon-hee, welcome Mi-ok into their home, but Seon-hee begins to have misgivings when she sees a strange wooden doll that the maid has brought with her. Having suffered from nightmares about exactly the same doll, Seon-hee becomes increasingly suspicious and paranoid that Mi-ok is trying to kill her and usurp her household. In a sudden fit of madness, Seon-hee causes Mi-ok to fall to her death. From then on, Seon-hee is tormented horribly by visions of the doll attacking her and it starts to take a great toll on her sanity. Is it actually happening or just all in the girl's mind?

== Cast ==
- Kim Young-ae ... Seon-hee
- Yoon Il-bong ... Kang Yu-jin
- Lee Ki-seon ... Mi-ok
- Hyun Hye-ri
- Kim Geun-hie
- Kim Min-gyu
- Kim Gi-jong
- Lee Yae-sung
- Gwak Geon
- Yoo Myeong-sun

== Release ==
Suddenly at Midnight was released in South Korea on 17 July 1981, and received a total of 28,178 admissions. The film received a South Korean VHS edition manufactured by Bethel Program in 1989. It was then subsequently released on Blu-ray for the first time ever worldwide in early 2017 by Mondo Macabro.

In 2017, the Bucheon International Fantastic Film Festival and the Korean Film Archive jointly digitally remastered the film and restored its sound, with the restored version screened at that year's festival.

== Critical response ==
The movie and Ko Young-nam are referred to as a classic work and director of Korean horror film. In a review for Koreanfilm.org, Darcy Paquet cited Suddenly at Midnight as a rare example of 1970s-80s Korean horror that was genuinely frightening, describing it as "a mysterious psychological study... that beguiles the viewer right up to its bizarre closing image." He praised the film's direction, saying, "Ko has a good feel for how to create tension from precise editing and the patient accumulation of evocative details", and also credited actress Kim Young-ae for a "convincing performance as the panicked wife".

== Legacy ==
The film underwent a later critical rediscovery. Writing for Weekly Kyunghyang in 2011, Lee Seong-won noted that the film initially attracted little attention and was regarded as derivative of Kim Ki-young's The Housemaid (1960). However, subsequent television broadcasts helped the film develop a cult following. Lee also compared its psychological horror to Roman Polanski's Repulsion (1965) and The Tenant (1976).

In 2021, the Korean Film Council noted that it had taken roughly three decades for Suddenly in Dark Night to be rediscovered and appreciated, identifying it as part of a broader reassessment of pre-1990 South Korean horror cinema.

In 2024, the British Film Institute included the film in its list of "10 great South Korean horror films".
