= Peasants (film) =

- Theatrical poster
- Hangul: 흙
- Lit.: Dirt
- RR: Heuk
- MR: Hŭk
- Directed by: Kim Ki-young
- Written by: Kim Yong-Jin; Lee Kwang-sun
- Produced by: Lee Woo-suk
- Starring: Lee Hwa-si; Kim Chung-chul
- Cinematography: Koo Joong-mo
- Edited by: Hyeon Dong-chun
- Music by: Han Sang-ki
- Distributed by: Dong-a Exports Co. Ltd.
- Release date: March 25, 1978
- Running time: 125 minutes
- Country: South Korea
- Language: Korean

Peasants (Korean: 흙; RR: Heuk; lit. 'Dirt') is a 1978 South Korean film directed by Kim Ki-young.

== Plot ==
During the Japanese occupation, a Korean lawyer devotes his work to rural development, believing this is the only way to preserve Korean identity. Interpreting these actions as anti-Japanese, the Japanese authorities imprison the lawyer for five years. When he is released, he finds his wife continuing his work.

== Cast ==
- Lee Hwa-si
- Kim Chung-chul
- Yeom Bok-sun
- Nam Sung-Hoon
- Park Jung-ja
- Kim Choo-ryeon
- Gwon Mi-hye
- Park Am
- Kim Won-seop
- Yeo Po

== Bibliography ==
- Lee, Sun-Hwa. "The Soil". The House of Kim Ki-young. Archived from the original on 2004-05-08.
