= Potato Lake =

Lake in the state of Minnesota, United States

- Location within Minnesota
- Location: Hubbard County, Minnesota
- Coordinates: 47°0′N 95°3.3′W
- Type: lake

Potato Lake is a lake in Hubbard County, in the U.S. state of Minnesota.

Potato Lake was named for a native root eaten by Native Americans.

== See also ==
- List of lakes in Minnesota
