= Diary of Korean-Japanese War =

- Theatrical poster for Diary of Korean-Japanese War (1978)
- Hangul: 난중일기
- Hanja: 亂中日記
- RR: Nanjungilgi
- MR: Nanjungilgi
- Directed by: Jang Il-ho
- Written by: Na Han-bong
- Produced by: Han Gap-jin
- Starring: Kim Jin-kyu; Jang Dong-he; Hwang Hae; Jeong Ae-ran; Tae Hyun-sil
- Cinematography: Seo Jeong-min
- Edited by: Ree Kyoung-ja
- Music by: Jeong Min-seob
- Distributed by: Han Jin Enterprises Co., Ltd
- Release date: January 21, 1978
- Running time: 125 minutes
- Country: South Korea
- Language: Korean

Diary of Korean-Japanese War (Korean: 난중일기; RR: Nanjungilgi), also known as A War Diary, is a 1978 South Korean historical war drama film directed by Jang Il-ho. It was chosen as Best Film at the Grand Bell Awards.

== Synopsis ==
Based on Admiral Yi Sun-sin's war diary, Nanjung ilgi, the film portrays Yi's life during the Imjin War (1592-1598).

== Cast ==
- Kim Jin-kyu
- Jang Dong-he
- Hwang Hae
- Jeong Ae-ran
- Tae Hyun-sil
- Na Ki-su
- Kim Jin
- Park Jun-ho
- Hah Myung-joong
- Kim Seong-ae

Preceded by Mother	Grand Bell Awards for Best Film; 1977	Succeeded by Police Story
