= Neumi =

- Poster for Neumi (1980)
- Hangul: 느미
- RR: Neumi
- MR: Nŭmi
- Directed by: Kim Ki-young
- Written by: Kim Ki-young
- Produced by: Kim Ki-young
- Starring: Chang Mi-hee; Hah Myung-joong
- Cinematography: Lee Seung-eon
- Edited by: Hyeon Dong-chun
- Music by: Han Sang-ki
- Distributed by: Shin Han Films
- Release date: June 13, 1980
- Running time: 110 minutes
- Country: South Korea
- Language: Korean
- Box office: $0

Neumi (Korean: 느미), also known as The Deaf Worker, is a 1980 South Korean film directed by Kim Ki-young.

== Synopsis ==
A melodrama about a mute woman who works at a brick factory.

== Cast ==
- Chang Mi-hee
- Hah Myung-joong
- Lee Hwa-si
- Kim Chung-chul
- Baek Il-seob
- Kwon Mi-Hye
- Park Am
- Lee Young-ho
- Joo Sun-tae
- Moon Mi-bong

== Bibliography ==
- Lee, Sun-Hwa. "Numi". The House of Kim Ki-young. Archived from the original on 2004-09-08.
- Sin, Chang-Heui. "A Study of the Images of Women in Kim Ki-young's Films: Woman of Fire, Numi, and Carnivore". The House of Kim Ki-young. Archived from the original on 2003-12-09.
