= Potato (film) =

- Theatrical poster for Potato (1987)
- Hangul: 감자
- Hanja: 甘藷
- RR: Gamja
- MR: Kamja
- Directed by: Byun Jang-ho
- Written by: Kim Ha-rim; Na Han-bong; Hong Jong-won; Lee Hee-woo
- Produced by: Byun Jang-ho
- Starring: Kang Soo-yeon; Kim In-moon
- Cinematography: Jung Il-sung
- Edited by: Park Soon-duk
- Music by: Lee Cheol-hyeok
- Distributed by: Dae Jong Films Co., Ltd
- Release date: March 1, 1987
- Running time: 112 minutes
- Country: South Korea
- Language: Korean

Potato (Korean: 감자; RR: Gamja) is a 1987 South Korean remake of a 1967 film with the same name, and the second adaptation of Kim Dong-in's short novel.

== Plot ==
Bok-nyeo is forced to marry a widower who is older than she is. After the marriage, she goes to work at a salt farm, where she is raped by her boss. Bok-nyeo decides to make money by changing her lifestyle. Later, she falls in love with a Chinese herbalist in Korea, Mr. Wang. Bok-nyeo becomes jealous when Mr. Wang gets married. She tries to kill Wang, but Mr. Wang kills Bok-nyeo and hides her body.

== Cast ==
- Kang Soo-yeon as Bok-nyeo
- Kim In-moon
- Lee Dae-keun as Mr. Wang
- Kim Hyeong-ja as Durene
- Choe In-suk
- Cho Ju-mi
