= List of South Korean films of 1977 =

A list of films produced in South Korea in 1977:

Title	Director	Cast	Genre	Notes
1977
The Gate	Yu Hyun-mok			
Iodo	Kim Ki-young	Lee Hwa-shi		
Night Voyage	Kim Soo-yong			
Toward That High Place	Im Won-shik			
Winter Woman	Kim Ho-sun			
A World Without Mom	Lee Won-se	Kim Jae-seong		
Japanese Invasion in the Year of Imjin and Gye Wol-hyang 임진란과 계월향(임진왜란과 계월향); Imjinlangwa Gye Wolhyang		Jeong Yun-hui		
High School Champ 고교 우량아; Gogyo ulyang-a		Jeong Yun-hui		
Mischief's Marching Song 얄개행진곡; Yalgaehaengjingog		Jeong Yun-hui		
