= Killer Butterfly =

- Poster for Killer Butterfly (1978)
- Hangul: 살인나비를 쫓는 여자
- Hanja: 殺人나비를 쫓는 女子
- RR: Sarin nabireul jjonneun yeoja
- MR: Sarin nabirŭl tchonnŭn yŏja
- Directed by: Kim Ki-young
- Written by: Lee Mun-ung
- Produced by: Jung Jin-woo
- Starring: Nam Koong Won; Kim Ja-ok
- Cinematography: Lee Seong-chun
- Edited by: Kim Hee-su
- Music by: Han Sang-ki
- Distributed by: Kuk Dong
- Release date: December 2, 1978
- Country: South Korea
- Language: Korean
- Box office: $2,376

Killer Butterfly (Korean: 살인나비를 쫓는 여자; lit. 'A Woman Chasing a Killer Butterfly') is a 1978 South Korean film directed by Kim Ki-young. It was released on Blu-ray by Mondo Macabro as Woman Chasing the Butterfly of Death; bonus material includes several interviews of people connected with the film.

== Plot ==
A melodrama about a man who survives an attempted suicide/murder with a stranger while picnicking with friends. He goes on a cave expedition for a famous archaeologist where he discovers a skeleton several thousand years old. He meets the spirit of the skeleton in a dream (probably), and then becomes romantically involved with the archeologist's daughter.

== Cast ==
- Namkoong Won
- Kim Ja-ok
- Kim Chung-chul
- Kim Man
- Park Am
- Lee Hyang
- Yeo Po
- Yu Sun-cheol
- Lee Gang-bae
- Kim So-jo
- Lee Hwa-si

== Bibliography ==
- Berry, Chris. "Killer Butterfly". The House of Kim Ki-young. Archived from the original on 2003-12-09.
- Choi, Eun-Suk. "Forbidden Desire and The Fantastic: Killer Butterfly". The House of Kim Ki-young. Archived from the original on 2003-12-10.
