= Yu Ji-in =

South Korean actress active since 1974 (born 1956)

- Born: Lee Yun-hui; January 27, 1956 (age 70); Seoul, South Korea
- Occupation: Actress
- Years active: 1974–present

Korean name
- Hangul: 이윤희
- Hanja: 李允熙
- RR: I Yunhui
- MR: I Yunhŭi

Stage name
- Hangul: 유지인
- Hanja: 兪知仁
- RR: Yu Jiin
- MR: Yu Chiin

Yu Ji-in (Korean: 유지인; born January 27, 1956) is a South Korean actress active since 1974. She was born Lee Yun-hui in Seoul, South Korea in 1956 and received a bachelor's and master's degree in Theater and Film from Chung-Ang University. When she was a freshman at the school in 1974, she started her acting career after getting elected in a joint recruit held by the Yeonbang Film, and Weekly Hankook. From onwards to 1977, she appeared in one to three films per year and at the same time, she also acted as a TV actress affiliated to TBC TV. Yu was commonly referred to as "New Troika" or "Second Troika" along with her rival actresses, Jeong Yun-hui and Chang Mi-hee of the 1970s and 1980s after the "First Troika", Moon Hee, Nam Jeong-im, and Yoon Jeong-hee of the 1960s.

== Filmography ==
*Note; the whole list is referenced.

- Green Knights (2007)
- Miri, Mari, Wuri, Duri (1988)
- The Winter That Year Was Warm (Geu hae gyeo-ul-eun ttatteushaessne, 1984)
- Wife (Anae, 1983)
- The Tree Blooming with Love (Salang-e kkochpineun namu, 1981)
- The Maiden Who Went to the City (Dosilo gan cheonyeo, 1981)
- Even If You Take Everything (Nae modeun geos-eul ppae-asgyeodo, 1981)
- Home of the Stars 3 (Byeoldeul-ui gohyang 3, 1981)
- Whale Island Escapade (Golaeseom sodong, 1981)
- Good Windy Day (Balambul-eo joh-eun nal, 1980)
- Unconditional Love (Akkim-eobs-i bachyeossneunde, 1980)
- Woman's Room (Yeoja-ui bang, 1980)
- You Whom I Cannot Hate (Mi-wohal su eobsneun neo, 1980)
- Echoes (Meari, 1980)
- The Man Who Dies Every Day (Mae-il jugneun namja, 1980)
- She is Something (Geu yeoja salamjabne, 1980)
- Dull Servant Pal Bul-chul (Palbulchul, 1980)
- The Hut (Pimag, 1980)
- The Man of the Past (Geuttae geusalam, 1980)
- The Last Secret Affair (Majimag mil-ae, 1980)
- One Night at a Strange Place (Nachseon gos-eseo halusbam, 1980)
- Woman on Vacation (Hyugabad-eun yeoja, 1980)
- Magnificent Experience (Hwalyeohan gyeongheom, 1980)
- Happiness of an Unhappy Woman (Bulhaenghan yeoja-ui haengbog, 1979)
- The Trappings of Youth (Cheongchun-ui deoch, 1979)
- The Man I Left (Naega beolin namja, 1979)
- 26 x 365 = 0 (26 x 365 = 0 26 x 365 = 0, 1979)
- The Rose That Swallowed Thorn (Gasileul samkin jangmi, 1979)
- Wild Ginseng (Simbwassda, 1979)
- The Terms of Love (Salang-ui jogeon, 1979)
- Sudden Flame (Gabjagi bulkkochcheoleom, 1979)
- Zero Woman (0nyeo, 1979)
- A Record of Love and Death (Salanggwa jug-eum-ui gilog, 1978)
- Confession of Life or Death (Saengsa-ui gobaeg, 1978)
- The Police Officer (Gyeongchalgwan, 1978)
- Rely on Your Brother (Oppaga issda, 1978)
- The Last Winter (Majimag gyeo-ull, 1978)
- The Last Leaf (Majimag Ipsae, 1977)
- Full Of Happy Dream (Puleun kkum-eul gadeughi, 1976)
- Return to Fatherland, Korea (Dol-a-on paldogangsan, 1976)
- You are the Sun and I'm the Moon (Neoneun dal naneun hae, 1976)
- The Tae-Baeks (Taebaegsanmaeg(Taebaeksanmaek), 1975)
- A Remodeled Beauty (Jeonghyeongmi-in, 1975)
- Nasang (1974)
- A Story of Crazy Painter: Gwanghwasa (1974)
- Hwannyeo (1974)
- Your Cold Hands (Geudae-ui chanson, 1974)

== Awards ==
- 1979, the 18th Grand Bell Awards, Best Actress for Simbwatda (심봤다)
- 1980, the 16th Baeksang Arts Awards, Best Film Actress for Simbwatda (심봤다)
