= Ban Geum-ryeon =

1982 South Korean film

- Poster for Ban Geum-ryeon (1982)
- Hangul: 반금련
- Hanja: 潘金蓮
- RR: Ban Geumryeon
- MR: Pan Kŭmnyŏn
- Directed by: Kim Ki-young
- Written by: Yeo Su-jung
- Produced by: Lee Woo-suk
- Starring: Lee Hwa-si; Shin Seong-il
- Cinematography: Jung Il-sung
- Edited by: Hyeon Dong-chun
- Music by: Han Jin-uk
- Distributed by: Dong-a Exports Co. Ltd.
- Release date: March 13, 1982
- Running time: 90 minutes
- Country: South Korea
- Language: Korean

Ban Geum-ryeon (Korean: 반금련; also known as The Story of Pan Jinlian) is a 1982 South Korean film directed by Kim Ki-young, based upon the 16th-century Chinese novel Jin Ping Mei. Filmed in 1975, the film was banned at the time, and 40 minutes of footage had been censored when it was finally released.

== Synopsis ==
A historical drama set in ancient China.

== Cast ==
- Lee Hwa-si
- Shin Seong-il
- Park Chun-deok
- Park Jung-ja
- Nam Neung-mi
- Jang Mi-ja
- Kim Young-ae
- Park Am
- Gang Bok-sun
- Jo Jae-seong
- Lee Chi-wu
- Chu Song-woong

== Bibliography ==
- Ban Geum-ryeon (1982) at IMDb
- "Ban Geum-ryun (Ban Geumryeon)(1981)". [KMDb Korean Movie Database].
- Lee, Jee-Eun. "The Story of Pan Kumyon". [The House of Kim Ki-young]. Archived from the original on 8 May 2004.
