= Come Unto Down =

- Theatrical poster
- Hangul: 낮은 데로 임하소서
- RR: Najeun dero imhasoseo
- MR: Najŭn tero imhasosŏ
- Directed by: Lee Jang-ho
- Written by: Yoon Jae-seop; Im Jin-taek; Lee Jang-ho
- Based on: Come Down to a Lower Place by Lee Cheong-jun
- Produced by: Park Jong-chan
- Starring: Lee Yeong-ho; Shin Seong-il; Na Young-hee
- Cinematography: Seo Jeong-min
- Edited by: Kim Hee-soo
- Music by: Kim Do-hyang
- Distributed by: HwaCheon Trading Co.
- Release date: June 26, 1982 (South Korea)
- Running time: 102 minutes
- Country: South Korea
- Language: Korean

Come Unto Down (Korean: 낮은 데로 임하소서; RR: Najeun dero imhasoseo; a.k.a. Come Down to a Lower Place) is a 1982 South Korean drama film directed by Lee Jang-ho, and based on the novel of the same title by Lee Cheong-jun. It was awarded Best Film at the Grand Bell Awards ceremony, and given the film award at the Baeksang Arts Awards.

== Synopsis ==
Yo-han is the son of a Christian minister. Following his father's career, he joins the seminary without much enthusiasm, then drops out. After doing his military service as a KATUSA, he teaches at the U.S. educational center. When he is given a job teaching in America, he hastily marries in preparation for the move. He is suddenly struck blind, then begins contemplating suicide. Instead he has a religious vision and dedicates himself to the ministry, and opens a church for the blind.

== Cast ==
- Lee Yeong-ho: Ahn Yo-han
- Shin Seong-il: Ahn Shin-sam
- Na Young-hee: Kang Eun-gyeong
- Ahn Sung-ki: Teacher Song
- Park Jung-ja: Mother
- Park Jae-ho: Jin-yong
- Cheon Dong-seok: Bang Ul-i
- Bok Hye-suk: Grandmother
- Kim Ji-young: Mother-in-law
- Moon Tai-sun: Rev. Kim

== Bibliography ==
=== English ===
- "NAJEUNDERO IMHASOSEO". The Complete Index to World Film.
- Najeundero imhasoseo (1982) at IMDb
- "Come Down to a Lower Place (Naj-eundelo imhasoseo; 1982)". Korean Movie Database (KMDb).

=== Korean ===
- 낮은 데로 임하소서 (in Korean). Cine21.
- 낮은 데로 임하소서 (1982) (in Korean). Korean Movie Database (KMDb).
