= Kim Won-seop =

South Korean baseball player (born 1978)

Kim Won-Seop
- Outfielder
- Born: December 18, 1978 (age 46)
- Batted: Left Threw: Left

KBO debut
- 2001, for the Doosan Bears

Last appearance
- 2016, for the Kia Tigers

KBO statistics
- Batting average: .271
- RBI: 306
- Stolen bases: 102
- Hits: 765

Teams
- Doosan Bears (2001, 2003); Kia Tigers (2003–2016)

Kim Won-Seop (Korean: 김원섭; Hanja: 金元燮; born December 18, 1978) is a former outfielder in the KBO League. He played with the Doosan Bears from 2001 to 2003 and the Kia Tigers from 2003 to 2016.
