= Iodo (film) =

- Theatrical poster
- Hangul: 이어도
- Hanja: 異魚島
- RR: Ieodo
- MR: Iŏdo
- Directed by: Kim Ki-young
- Written by: Ha Yoo-sang
- Based on: Iodo by Lee Cheong-jun
- Produced by: Lee Woo-seok
- Starring: Lee Hwa-si; Kim Jeong-cheol; Park Jeong-ja; Park Ahm
- Cinematography: Jeong Il-seong
- Edited by: Hyeon Dong-choon
- Music by: Han Sang-ki
- Production company: DongAh Exports Co. Ltd.
- Release date: October 4, 1977
- Running time: 110 minutes
- Country: South Korea
- Language: Korean

Iodo (Korean: 이어도), also called Io Island, is a 1977 South Korean mystery film directed by Kim Ki-young, and based on the 1974 novel of the same title by Lee Cheong-jun. The title of the movie comes from the mythical island of Ieodo, which also inspired several plot elements of the film. It was shown at the 28th Berlin International Film Festival.

== Plot ==
When a man from an island ruled by women disappears, the man suspected of killing him investigates his past.

== Cast ==
- Lee Hwa-si as Sohn Min-ja (The barmaid)
- Choi Yun-seok as Cheon Nam-seok
- Kim Chung-chul as Sun Wu-hyun
- Park Jung-ja as the shaman
- Park Am as the editor-in-chief of Jeju Ilbo, a fictional newspaper
- Kwon Mi-hae as Park Yeo-in
- Yeo Po
- Ko Sang-mi
- Lee Joung-ae
- Son Young-soon

== Release ==
In February 2012, Taewon Entertainment, in partnership with the Korean Film Archive, had released the film on DVD.
