= Yi Cheong-jun =

South Korean writer (1939–2008)

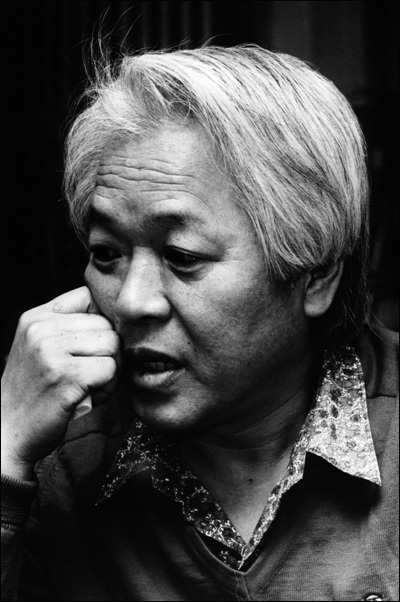
- Born: August 9, 1939; Jangheung, Zenranan-dō, Korea
- Died: July 31, 2008 (aged 68); Seoul, South Korea
- Education: Seoul National University
- Writing career
- Language: Korean
- Period: 1965–2008
- Notable works: The Wounded (1966); Seopyeonje (1976); Your Paradise (1976)

Korean name
- Hangul: 이청준
- Hanja: 李淸俊
- RR: I Cheongjun
- MR: I Ch'ŏngjun

Yi Cheong-jun (Korean: 이청준, 9 August 1939 - 31 July 2008) was a prominent South Korean novelist. Throughout his four decade-long career, Yi wrote more than 100 short stories and 13 novels.

== Biography ==
Yi Cheong-jun was born on August 9, 1939 in Jangheung County, Zenranan-dō, Korea, Empire of Japan. He graduated with a degree in German literature from Seoul National University. In 1965, he debuted with a short story titled Toewon (퇴원, lit. "Leaving the Hospital"). Two years later, he won a Dongin Literature Award for The Wounded (Byeongsingwa Meojeori, 병신과 머저리). He died from lung cancer at the age of 68 on July 31, 2008.

== Work ==
Yi Cheong-jun is considered one of the foremost writers of the 4.19 Generation and his literary output since has been both steady in pace and considerable in volume, and his subject matter has been varied. The Wounded (Byeongsin gwa mejeori, 1966) probes the spiritual malaise of the post-war Korean youth; This Paradise of Yours (Dangsindeurui cheonguk, 1976) explores the dialectics of charity and will to power, with the leper colony of Sorok Island as the backdrop; and The Fire Worshipers (Bihwa milgyo, 1985) meditates on the meaning of human rituals conducted in a Godless society when no ultimate guarantee of the absolute can be given. Yi Cheong-jun's fiction encompasses a broad range of political, existential and metaphysical concerns.

One of the recurrent themes in his fiction, however, has been the concern with language as a vehicle of truth. The Walls of Rumor (Somunui byeok, 1972) describes the ways in which freedom of speech was repressed in the ideologically charged atmosphere of Korean society in the era of national division. Stories contained in the collection In Search of Lost Words (Ireobeorin mareul chajaseo, 1981) continue the investigation of the effect of political violence on language. Because thought cannot be separated from the modes of its expression, distortions of language in a politically repressive society effect psychological damages as well. The tyranny of political and social systems as they become internalized in individual psyches becomes inextricably bound to questions of language in Yi Cheongjun's fiction.

Another favorite theme is the role of art in life. Such early stories as The Falconer (Maejabi) and The Target (Gwanyeok) feature artisans dedicated to the perfection of their craft, often at the cost of conventional happiness. In later years Yi Cheongjun drew on forms of traditional folk art and the Korean spirit embodied in them as a source of inspiration. For example, the work Seopyeonje (1993) foregrounds the genre of pansori, a traditional Korean oral performance which features a singer of tales accompanied by a single drummer. Here, artistic expression becomes both a mode of reconciliation to life, in spite of its countless woes, and ultimately of its transcendence. Made into a blockbuster feature film, Seopyeonje also helped revive great popular interest in the art of pansori.

== Works in translation ==
- The Snowy Road and Other Stories (단편소설선 <눈길>)
- Your Paradise (당신들의 천국)
- The Prophet and Other Stories (이청준 소설선 <예언자> 외)
- Seopyeonje (서편제)
- The Cruel City and Other Korean Short Stories (한국대표단편선(2))
- Two Stories from Korea: "The Wounded" and "The Abject"

== Works in Korean (partial) ==
Many of his works have been adapted into movies or drama series by leading directors. Among them are:

- Iodo directed by Kim Ki-young (1977).
- Seopyeonje directed by Im Kwon-taek (1993), about a traditional pansori master who travels the country with his adopted son and daughter.
- Beyond the Years directed again by Im Kwon-taek (2007), was based on The Wanderer of Seonghak-dong
- Secret Sunshine, directed by Lee Chang-dong (2007), was using the plot provided by the novella The Abject.

According to a critic, Kim Byeong-ik (김병익), Yi opened a new pace of Korean literature before the true modern literature of Korea was established in 1960s.

== Awards ==
- 1967: Dong-in Literary Award for The Wounded
- 1978: Yi Sang Literary Award for The Cruel City
- 1985: Korean Literature Prize for The Fire Worshipers
- 1990: Isan Literature Prize for The Gate of Liberty
- 2003: Inchon Award
- 2007: Ho-Am Prize in the Arts

== See also ==
- Korean literature
- Cinema of Korea
- Park Kyung-ni
