= Jung Jin-woo =

South Korean film director and producer (1938–2026)

- Born: January 17, 1938; Korea, Empire of Japan
- Died: February 8, 2026 (aged 88); Gangnam, Seoul, South Korea
- Occupations: Film director and producer
- Years active: 1963–1995

Korean name
- Hangul: 정진우
- Hanja: 鄭鎭宇
- RR: Jeong Jinu
- MR: Chŏng Chinu

Jung Jin-woo (Korean: 정진우; January 17, 1938 – February 8, 2026) was a South Korean film director and producer. Jung made his directorial debut with The Only Son (1963) at the age of 23, setting the Korean record for the youngest person to direct a movie. After finishing Early Rain (1966), he went on to direct The Ran's Elegy (1965), The Secret Meeting (1965), and The Student Boarder (1966).

Jung died from complications of a fall and COVID-19 on February 8, 2026, at the age of 88.

== Selected filmography ==
=== As director ===
- The Only Son (1963)
- The Secret Meeting (1965)
- The Ran's Elegy (1965)
- Early Rain (1966)
- The Student Boarder (1966)
- Gunsmoke (1966)
- The White Crow (1967)
- Cloud (1968)
- Woman (1968)
- Frozen Spring (1970) (also credited as producer)
- Oyster Village (1972) (also credited as producer)
- Long Live the Island Frogs (1972) (also credited as producer)
- End of an Affair (1975)
- Adultery Tree (1985) (also credited as producer)
- Autumn After Love (1986)
- Mugunghwa (Korean National Flower) (1995) (also credited as producer)

=== As producer ===
- Woman of Fire (1971)
- Killer Butterfly (1978)

== Awards ==
- 1971: Best director for Frozen Spring at the 14th Buil Film Awards
- 1973: Best director for Long Live the Island Frogs at the 10th Blue Dragon Film Awards
- 1974: Best director for Oyster Village at the 16th Buil Film Awards
- 1979: Best director for I Saw the Wild Ginseng at the 18th Grand Bell Awards
- 1980: Special mention at the 1st Korean Association of Film Critics Awards
- 1984: Best director for Adultery Tree at the 23rd Grand Bell Awards
- 1985: Best director for Adultery Tree at the 5th Korean Association of Film Critics Awards
- 2014: Lifetime Achievement Award for the Advancement of Cinema at the 51st Grand Bell Awards
- 2015: Lifetime Achievement Award at the 35th Korean Association of Film Critics Awards
