= Byun Jang-ho =

South Korean film director (1940–2022)

- Born: 27 April 1940; Icheon, Korea, Empire of Japan
- Died: 25 February 2022 (aged 81)
- Occupation: Film director
- Years active: 1967–2022

Korean name
- Hangul: 변장호
- Hanja: 卞長鎬
- RR: Byeon Jangho
- MR: Pyŏn Changho

Byun Jang-ho (27 April 1940 – 25 February 2022) was a South Korean film director.

== Biography ==
Byun made about 90 films in a career that spans more than 30 years. His film Love Me Once Again Despite Hatred '80 (1980) was one of the greatest Korean box office hits in 1980.

Jang-ho was born on 27 April 1940. His film Potato (1988) is a remake of a 1967 film and the second adaptation of Kim Dong-in's short novel of the same name. It won Best Supporting Actor, Best Supporting Actress, Best Screenplay and Best Music at the 26th Grand Bell Awards in 1987.

Jang-ho died on 25 February 2022, at the age of 81.

== Filmography ==
- The Sun is Mine (1967)
- Lost Love in the Mist (1969)
- Affection and Love (1969)
- Window (1969)
- Temptation (1969)
- The Rainy Myungdong Street (1970)
- Wang and Pak on Myeongdong Street (1970)
- When a Woman Removes Her Makeup (1970)
- Men vs. Women (1970)
- My Love, My Foe (1971)
- Find the 72 Karat Diamond (1971)
- It Rains on the Heart of a Man (1971)
- I'm a Man on Myungdong (1971)
- Black Rose in Shanghai (1971)
- Leaving in the Rain (1971)
- Cruel History of Myeongdong (1972)
- Life is on the Lonely Road (1972)
- A Way of Farewell (1972)
- An Odd General (1972)
- Gate of Woman (1972)
- Wedding Dress in Tears (1973)
- The Tragedy of Deaf Sam-yong (1973)
- Wedding Dress in Tears 2 (1974)
- Black Butterfly (1974)
- The Executioner (1975)
- Story of the Youth (1975)
- Woman Like A Crane (1975)
- The Kept Woman (1976)
- Miss Oh's Apartment (1978)
- Young-ah's Confession (1978)
- The Light Goes Off in Your Window (1978)
- Red Gate of Tragedy (1979)
- Miss Oh's Apartment (Sequel) (1979)
- Zero Woman (1979)
- Eul-hwa (1979)
- The Happiness of an Unhappy Woman (1979)
- Love Me Once Again Despite Hatred '80 (1980)
- Goodbye Daddy '81 (1981)
- Forgive Me Once Again Despite Hatred '80' (1981)
- Choi In-ho's Evening Color (1982)
- Night of a Sorceress (1982)
- Love and Farewell (1984)
- Milky Way in Blue Sky (1986)
- Eve's Second Bedroom (1987)
- Potato (1988)
- Honeymoon (1989)
- A Journey with Korean Masters (2013)

== Awards ==
- 1971 8th Blue Dragon Film Awards: Best New Director (When a Woman Removes Her Makeup)
