= Lee Jang-ho =

South Korean filmmaker (born 1945)

- Born: May 15, 1945 (age 81); South Korea
- Occupations: Film director, screenwriter

Korean name
- Hangul: 이장호
- Hanja: 李長鎬
- RR: I Jangho
- MR: I Changho

Lee Jang-ho (Korean: 이장호; born May 15, 1945) is a South Korean film director and screenwriter.

== Filmography ==
- Heavenly Homecoming to Stars (1974) - director
- It Rained Yesterday (1974) - director
- You Become a Star, Too (1975) - director
- Yes, Goodbye for Today (1976) - director, screenwriter
- A Fine, Windy Day (1980) - director, screenwriter
- Children of Darkness Part 1, Young-ae the Songstress (1981) - director, screenwriter
- They Shot the Sun (1982) - director, screenwriter
- Come Unto Down (1982) - director, screenwriter
- The Green Pine Tree (1983) - director
- Widow Dance (1984) - director, screenwriter
- Declaration of Fools (1984) - director
- Between the Knees (1984) - director, screenwriter
- Eoudong (1985) - director
- Lee Jang-ho's Baseball Team (1986) - director, producer
- Y's Experience (1987) - director, producer
- The Man with Three Coffins (1987) - director, screenwriter, producer
- Gam-dong (1988) - producer
- Lee Jang-ho's Alien Baseball Team 2 (1988) - producer
- Miss Rhino and Mr. Korando (1989) - director
- The Story Inside the Handbag (1991) - producer
- The Room in the Forest (1992) - producer
- Myong-Ja Akiko Sonia (1992) - director
- Declaration of Genius (1995) - director, screenwriter
- Hakuna Matata - A Story of Jirani (documentary, 2010) - actor
- A Journey with Korean Masters (2013) - director, screenwriter
- God's Eye View (2014) - director

== Awards ==
- 1980 19th Grand Bell Awards: Best Director (A Fine, Windy Day)
- 1982 21st Grand Bell Awards: Best Director (Come Unto Down)
- 2022 27th Chunsa International Film Festival: Achievement Award
