= Park Am =

South Korean actor (1924–1989)

- Born: February 29, 1924; Keijō, Keiki-dō, Korea, Empire of Japan
- Died: March 22, 1989 (aged 65)
- Occupation: Actor
- Years active: 1952–1988

Korean name
- Hangul: 박영철
- Hanja: 朴永撤
- RR: Bak Yeongcheol
- MR: Pak Yŏngch'ŏl

Stage name
- Hangul: 박암
- Hanja: 朴嚴
- RR: Bak Am
- MR: Pak Am

Park Am (born November 11, 1924 – March 22, 1989) was a South Korean actor. Park was born in Seoul in 1924. He graduated from the college of Dentistry at Seoul National University.

== Filmography ==
*Note; the whole list is referenced.

Year	English title	Korean title	Romanization	Role	Director
	New Machine Wuroimae Part 5		Nyumeosin Wuroimae		
1988	Sa Bangji		Sabangji		
	Sunshine at Present		Kigeun-eun yangji		
	Wuroi-mae and Mobilization of Thunder-V		Wuroemae 4tan sseondeobeu-i chuldong		
	Exciting Lives of Three Girls		yalsuk-i-deul-ui gaeseongsidae		
	The Trap		Deoch		
	A Bold Woman		Wungdam buin		
	Sorrow		Bichang		
1986	No Regret		Jeolmeunbam huhoe-eobda		
	My Bare Feet In The Air		Gongjung-e tteun na-ui maenbal		
	Moonlight Hunter		Dalbich sanyangkkun		
	Keum Dal-rae		Geumdalrae		
	Great March of Tomboys		Malgwalryang-i daehaengjin		
	Hwang Jin-ie		Hwang Jin-I		
1986	Lee Jang-ho's Baseball Team		Lee Jang-ho-ui oeingudan		
	The Sorcerer		Hwalaeng-i		
	College Story		Daehagbyeolgog		
	Wedding Night Misunderstanding		Cho-ya-e taneun gang		
1984	Hunting of Fools		Babosanyang		
	Holy Mission				
	North and South		Namgwa buk		
	My Love 3		Salanghaneun salam-a 3		
	A Country Affair		Bultaneun sinrok		
	Short Embrace, Long Goodbye		Jjalbeun po-ong gin ibyeol		
	Kalmae-gi's Burning Passion		Jeongyeom-ui galmaegi		
	Promised Woman		Yaksokhan yeoja		
	Public Cemetery of Grudges		Wonhan-ui gongdongmyoji		
	Lying Like Grass		Pulipcheoreom nupda		
	Wind, Wind, Wind		Baram Baram Baram		
	Tan-ya		Tanya		
	Dracula in a Coffin		Gwansog-ui deulakyula		
	The Flower Snake That Sheds Its Skin Every Day		Nalmada heomulbeosneun kkochbaem		
	Jin-ah's Rose Eaten By Bugs		Jin-a-ui beolremeokeun jangmi		
	Die To Live		Jug-eumyeon sallila		
	Women's Rage in Three Countries		Samgug-yeohan		
	The Blues of Jong-ro		Jonglo buleuseu		
	The Afterworld		Sahusegye		
	Last Stop		Jongjeom		
	A Battle Journal		Jonggunsucheob		
	Geniuses With the Grade F		Epeu hagjeom-ui cheonjaedeul		
	Mandara		Mandala		
	The Invited Ones		Chodaebad-eun salamdeul		
	The One I Love		Salanghaneun salam-a		
	The Female Vampire of the Night		Heubhyeolgwi yanyeo		
1982	Ban Geum-ryeon		Ban Geumryeon		
	A Monstrous Corpse		Goesi		
	The Man Who Dies Every Day		Mae-il jugneun namja		
	The Man of the Past		Geuttae geusalam		
	Song of the Dead		Manglyeong-ui gog		
	The Long Winter of the Idiots		Meojeolideul-ui gin gyeo-ul		
	Son of a Man		Salam-ui adeul		
	Earth Tremor		Ttang-ullim		
	Mrs. Kangbyun		Gangbyeonbu-in		
1979	Water Lady		Sunyeo		
	We Took the Night Train		Ulineun bamchaleul tass-eubnida		
	The Terms of Love		Salang-ui jogeon		
1980	Neu-mi		Neumi		
	A Promise on the Last Day		Majimag nal-ui eon-yag		
1980	The Hidden Hero		Gisbal-eobneun gisu		
	King Sejong the Great		*Sejongdae-wang		
	Goddess of Mercy		Gwanse-eumbosal		
	Man on Top of a Roof		Jibung-wi-ui namja		
	The Home of Stars 2		Byeoldeul-ui gohyang		
1978	Killer Butterfly		Sal-innabileul jjochneun yeoja		
	The Swamp of Exile		Mangmyeong-ui neup		
	I Love Only You		Dangsinman-eul salanghae		
1978	Peasants		Heulg		
	Road		Gil		
	In Vain		Musang		
	Special Mission Number 8		Teugmyeong 8ho		
	The Tripitaka Koreana		Hogug Palmandaejanggyeong		
	Eagle, Spread Your Wings		Dogsuli nalgaeleul pyeola		
	A War Diary		Nanjung-ilgi		
1977	Iodo		I-eodo		
	Mission of Canon-Chungjin		Kaenoncheongjingongjag		
	The Woman I Betrayed		Naega beolin yeoja		
	Does the Nak-Dong River Flow?		Nagdonggang-eun heuleuneunga		
	Wonsan Secret Operation		Wonsangongjag		
1976	Let's Talk About Youth		Cheongchun-eul i-yagihabsida		
1976	Love of Blood Relations		Hyeol-yug-ae		
	Five Commandments		Ogye		
	Forgiven Woman		Yongseobad-eun yeo-in		
	Feelings		Yujeong		
	The March of Fools		Babodeul-ui haengjin		
	Escape		Talchul		
1975	Promise of the Flesh		Yugche-ui yagsog		
1975	Remodelled Beauty		Jeonghyeongmi-in		
	Glory in Ten's		10dae-ui yeonggwang		
	The Last Embrace		Majimag po-ong		
	Pupils of the Evil		Agma-ui jejadeul		
	It Is You		Geugeon neo		
	The Unforgettables		Ij-eul suneun eobsgessji		
	Calling Soul in the Fog		Angaesog-ui chohon		
	Spies in the National Assembly		Gughoepeulagchi		
	Gypsy in my Mind		Ma-eum-ui jipsi		
	I Have To Live		Naneun sal-a-ya handa		
	Yoo Kwan-Sun		Yu Gwansun		
	Love Each Other		Seolo joh-ahae		
	The Han River		Hangang		
	The Wild Flowers in the Battle Field		Deulgughwaneun pi-eossneunde		
	A Tadpole's Courtship		Olchaeng-i gu-aejagjeon		
	First Love at Myeongdong		Myeongdong-eseo cheossalang-eul		
	Testimony		Jeung-eon		
	Jongya		Jong-ya		
	20 Years After Independence and Paekpom Kim Ku		Gwangbog 20nyeongwa Baekbeom Gim Gu	Kim Ku	
	A She-sailor		Cheonyeosagong		
	My Heart is Blue Sky		Ma-eum-eun puleun haneul		
	Weird Youth		Byeolnan cheongchun		
	Lovers of Seoul		Seo-ul-ui yeon-in		
	An Echo of an Angel		Cheonsa-ui me-ali		
	A Toast		Chugbae		
	The Great Hell		Daeji-og		
	A Woman in a Mud Flat		Gaesbeolsog-ui yeoja		
	A Woman Called 'Daddy'		Appala buleuneun yeo-in		
	Duel in Nang San		Nangsan-ui gyeoltu		
	Two Sons Crying For Their Mother Love		Mojeong-e uneun du-adeul		
1972	Insect Woman		Chungnyeo		
	Young Teacher		Cheongchungyosa		
	Great Monk Seo-San		Seosandaesa		
	A Way of Farewell		Ibyeol-ui gil		
	Viva, The Island Frog		Seomgaeguli manse		
1972	Patriotic Martyr An Jung-gun		Uisa An Junggeun		
	When a Little Dream Blooms...		Jag-eun kkum-i kkochpil ttae		
	On a Star Shining Night		Byeol-i bichnaneun bam-e		
	Whirl of Betrayals on Myeongdong		Myeongdongsamgugji		
	Quit Your Life		Ingansapyoleul sseola		
1971	When a Woman Breaks Her Jewel Box		Oghab-eul kkaetteulil ttae		
	Iron Man from Hong Kong		Hongkong-eseo on cheol-inbag		
	A Sworn Brother		Uihyeong		
	Bachelor in Trouble		Malsseongnan chonggag		
	Between You and Me		Dangsingwa na sa-i-e		
	When We Meet Again		Mannabwado jigeum-eun		
	Brother and Sister in the Rain		Bi-e jeoj-eun du nammae		
	The Golden Eagle		Hwanggeumdogsuli		
	Saturday Afternoon		To-yo-il-ohu		
	The Women of Kyeongbokgung		Gyeongboggung-ui yeo-indeul		
	Tokyo Lion and Myeongdong Tiger		Donggyeongsaja-wa Myeongdongholang-i		
	Return of the Condemned		Dol-a-on sahyeongsu		
	When We Share Pain Together		Neo-wa naega apeum-eul gat-i haess-eul ttae		
	Heartless on Harbor		Hanggumujeong		
	Rage		Bunno		
	Two Wives		Cheo-wa cheo		
	The Confession of a Girl		Eoneu sonyeo-ui gobag		
	The Night		Bam		
	Madame Shell		Solabu-in		
	The Informant		Ya Gwangju		
	An Abandoned Woman		Beolimbad-eun yeoja		
	What's the Use of Crying		Ulgineun wae ul-eo		
	Sunday Night and Monday Morning		Il-yo-il bamgwa wol-yo-il achim		
	The Good Father-in-law		Hal-abeojineun meosjaeng-i		
	The Sun Never Gets Old		Tae-yang-eun neulgji anhneunda		
1970	Wang-geon, the Great		Taejo Wang Geon		
	Swordsmen From Eight Provinces		Paldogeomgaeg		
	Tears of an Angel		Cheonsa-ui nunmul		
	Myeongdong Fella, Nampodong Fella		Myeongdongsana-i-wa Nampodongsana-i		
	The Naked Sun		Beolgeobeoseun Taeyang		
	Man of Desires		Yogmang-ui sana-i		
	Dangerous Liaison		Wiheomhan gwangye		
	Back Alley No. 5		Dwisgolmog obeonji		
	Born in Nampo-dong		Nampodong chulsin		
	Jang, the Knife		Naipeu Jang		
	Old Gentleman in Myeongdong		Myeongdongnosinsa		
	Scamp in Hanyang		Han-yanggeondal		
	Tears in the Heart		Gaseum-e Maetchin Nunmul		
	Devotion		Hanmogsum Dabachyeo		
	Blue Apple		Pureun Sagwa		
	Chaser		Chugyeogja		
	Original Intention		Chosim		
	First Night		Cheonnalbam Gabjagi		
	Window		Chang		
	Castle of Rose		Jangmi-ui Seong		
	Love and Song		I Gangsan Naghwa Yusu		
	Women Placed Above Men		Yeoseong Sang-wi Sidae		
	Shanghai of Fog		Angaekkin Sanghae		
	Sahwasan Mountain		Sahwasa		
	Condemned Criminals		O-in-ui Sahyeongsu		
	Lost Love		Eoneu Haneul Araeseo		
	Rejected First Love		Amuri Mi-wodo		
	Empty Heart		Heomuhan Ma-eum		
	Women of Yi-Dynasty		Ijo Yeoin Janhogsa		
	A Glorious Operation		Gyeolsa Daejakjeon		
	Can't Forget		Mot-ijeo		
1969	Elegy of Ren		Len-ui Aega		
	Opium Flower		Apyeonkkot		
	Bitter But Once Again		Miwodo Dasi Hanbeon		
	A Thing Called Love		Salang Iran Geoseun		
	Hiding Tears		Nunmul-eul Gamchugo		
	Tomorrow		Naeil-eun Jugeuljirado		
	Winter Woman		Gyeoul Buin		
	Black Evening Gowns		Geomeun Yahoebok		
	The Main Room		Naesil		
	Endless Love		Amuri Saranghaedo		
	A Wonderer in Myeong-dong		Myeong-dong Nageune		
	A Plateau		Gowon		
	Under the Roof		Eoneu Jibung Miteseo		
	A Left-hander in Tokyo		Donggyeon-ui Oensonjabi		
1969	Assassin		Amsalja		
	Forget-me-not		Mulmangcho		
	Immortal Rivers and Mountains		Mangogangsan		
	Let Me Free		Idaeto Tteonage Hae Juseyo		
	Leave Your Heart		Ddeonado Maeummaneun		
	Husband		Nampyeon		
	One Step in the Hell		Hanbareun Jioge		
	Undercover Emissary and Black Mask		Amhaeng-eosa-wa Heugdugeon		
	Friend's Husband		Hanbeon Jun Maeuminde		
	A Story of Seoul		Seoul Yahwa		
	Escape		Talchul Sipchilsi		
	Where is He Now		Jigeum Geu Sarameun		
	Remorse		Hoesim		
	Blues of the Twilight		Hwanghon-ui Bureuseu		
	The King of a Rock Cave		Amgul Wang		
	Born in May		O wol-saeng		
	Lonely Marriage Night		Doksugongbang		
	Lady in Dream		Mongnyeo		
	Nightmare		Angmong		
	Remarriage		Jaehon		
1968	Prince Daewon		Dae-wongun		
	A Police Note		Hyeongsa Sucheop		
	The Geisha of Korea		Paldo Gisaeng		
	No Grudge after Death		Jugeodo Haneun Eopda		
	Burning Passions		Jeongyeom		
	Mistress Manong		Jeongbu Manong		
	Jade Pin		Ok Binyeo		
	A Journey		Yeoro		
	Sorrow Over the Waves		Seulpeumeun Padoreul Neomeo		
	Enraged Land		Seongnan Daeji		
	White Night		Baegya		
	Cloud		Gureum		
	Winds and Clouds		Pung-un; Imran Yahwa		
	A Young Zelkova		Jeolmeun Neutinamu		
	Scandal		Pamun		
	The Adventure of Great Ttolttori		Dae Ttolttoriui Moheom		
	Students of Karl Marx		Karl Marx-ui Jejadeul		
	Rang		Rang		
	Sweetheart		Jeongdeun nim		
	Love Me Once Again		Miweodo Dasi Han Beon		
	A Swordsman in the Twilight		Hwanghonui Geomgaek		
	A Virtuous Woman		Chilbuyeollyeo		
	A Teacher in an Island		Seommaeul Seonsaeng		
	An Angry Calf		Seongnan Songaji		
	Seoul is Full		Seoureun Manwonida		
	Youth with Scars		Sangcheoppunin Cheongchun		
	A Grief		Aesang		
	Madam of Myeong-wol Kwan		Myeong-wolgwan Assi		
	Bare-handed Youth		Maenjumeok Cheongchun		
	Revenge for Me		Naehaneul Pureodao		
	History of the Three States		Pung-un Samgukji		
	Disclosure		Pongno		
	Three Swordsmen of Iljimae		Iljimae Samgeomgaeg		
	Mrs. Seoul		Seoul Ajumma		
	[LMyeongdong Hussy		Myeongdong-walgadag		
	Madame Jet		Jeteu Buin		
	Injo Restoration		Injobanjeong		
	Big Monster Wangmagwi		Ujugoein Wangmagwi		
	A Honeymoon		Mirwol		
	A Popular Woman		Somunnan Yeoja		
	The Dead and the Alive		Jugeun Jawa San Ja		
	River of Farewell		Ibyeol-eui Gang		
	Horse-year Bride		Maltti Sinbu		
1967	The Life of Na Woon-gyu		Naungyu Ilsaeng		
	I Am a King		Naneun Wang-ida		
	Night Blues		Bamhaneurui Blues		
	Red Ants		Bulgaemi		
1966	A Soldier Speaks After Death		Byeongsaneun Jugeoseo Malhanda		
	8240 K.L.O		8240 K.L.O		
	I Am a Traitor		Naneun maegukno		
	War and a Female Teacher		Jeonjaenggwa Yeogyosa		
	Eyes of Gold		Hwanggeumeu Nun		
	An Angel Without a House		Jib-eopneun Cheonsa		
	A Burning Youth		Bultaneun Cheongchun		
	[LOk-i Makes a Judge Cry		Beopchangeul ulrin ok-i		
	An Invulnerable		Mujeokja		
	Ballad for a Mill		Banga Taryeong		
	The 5th Frontline of Spy		Spai Je Ojeonseon		
	Pyeongyang Gisaeng		Pyeongyang Gisaeng		
	When the Day Comes		Eonjena Geunarimyeon		
	The Tiger Moth		Bulnabi		
	Sunset in the River Sarbin		무명		
	Fading in the Rain		Bissok-e Jida		
	The Youngest Daughter		Mangnaettal		
	The Field Glow with the Setting Sun		No-euljin Deullyeok		
	The Cradlesong in Tears		Nunmur-ui Jajangga		
	For Whom He Resist		Nugureul Wihan Banhang-inya		
	The Woman with a Past		Gwageoreul gajin yeoja		
	The Contract Marriage		Gyegag Gyeolhon		
	The Young Girls		Gasinai		
	Don't Cry, Hong-do		Hongdo-ya Ulji Mara		
	Look Up the Sky and Look Down the Earth		Haneulbogo Ttang-eul Bogo		
	Blood-soaked Mountain Guwol		Pi-eorin Gu-wolsan		
1965	Lee Seong-gye King Taejo		Taejo Lee Seonggye		
	Airborne Troops		Teukjeondae		
	Cheonggyecheon Stream		Cheonggyecheon		
	The Nobleman at Jeong-dong		Jeongdongdaegam		
	Incheon Landing Operations		Incheonsangryukjakjeon		
	A Life Wailing in Sorrow		Ulmyeonseo Hansesang		
	Courage is Alive		Yongsaneun Sara Itda		
	Only a Woman Should Cry?		Yeojamani Uleoya Hana		
	The Beautiful Eyes		Areumdaun Nundongja		
	Behold with an Angry Face		Seongnan Eolgullo Dol-abora		
	The Angry Heroes		Seongnan Yeong-ungdeul		
	Good and Evil		Seongwa Ak		
	Haircutting Motherly Love		Sakbal-ui Mojeong		
	The Martyrs		Sungyoja		
	The Empty Dream		Chunmong		
	Love, Don't Make Us Cry		Sarang-a Ulriji-mara		
	My Innocent Lady		Punnaegi Ae-in		
	The Arrest Order		Cheporyeong		
	The Younger Brother-in-law		Sidongsaeng		
1965	Red Scarf		Ppalgan Mahura		
	The Governor at Pyeongyang Province		Pyeongyang Gamsa		
	Night is Lovely		Bam-I Geuri-wo		
1964	Asphalt		Asphalt		
1964	Extra Human Being		Ing-yeo Ingan		
	The Dangerous Flesh		Wiheomhan Yukche		
	Mom is the Best		Uri-eomma Choego		
	The Yangtze River		Yangjagang		
	The Chaste Woman Arang		Arang-ui Jeongjo		
	The Smile in Grief		Seulpeun Miso		
	The Line of Emergency at Dawn		Saebyeog-ui Bisangseon		
	The Saja Castle		Saja Seong		
	The Distorted Youth		Binnagan Cheongchun		
	My Dear		Bogosipeun Eolgul		
	The Meaning to Plant a Phoenix Tree Is		Byeogodong Simeun Tteuseun		
	Princess Snow White		Baekseolgongju		
	Let's Meet on Thursday		Mogyoire Mannapsida		
	The Thirsty Trees		Mokmareun Namudeul		
	The Secret Service Agent in the Continent		Daeryugui Milsa		
	My Wife is Confessing		Anaeneun Gobaekhanda		
	The Housemaid		Singmo		
	The Teacher with Ten Daughters		Sipjamae Seonsaeng		
	The Student Couple		Haksaeng Bubu		
	My Mind Is Like a Lake		Naemaeum-eun Hosu		
	Sakyamuni Buddha		Seokgamoni		
	The Single Mom		Hol-eomeoni		
	A Winter Vagabond		Gyeo-ul Nageune		
	Romantic Family		Romance Gajok		
	A Tumen River Full of Tears		Nunmuljeojeun Dumangang		
	Love and Good-bye		Mannal Ttaewa He-eojil Ttae		
	King's Secret Agent		Mapaewa Geom		
	Impossible Love		Geonneoji Motaneun Gang		
	A Beggar Prince		Geoji Wangja		
	The Classroom of Youth		Cheongchun Gyosil		
	Jimmy is Not Sad		Jimmyneun Seulpeuji Anta		
	Angry Cosmos		Seongnan Coseumoseu		
	The Masked Prince		Bongmyeondaegun		
	A Black Discontinuous Line		Geomeun Buryeonsokseon		
	Great Wall of Love and Tears		Saranggwa Nunmului Manniseong		
	Because They Love Until Death		Jukdorok Saranghaeseo		
	A Sad Story of Danjong		Danjong-aesa		
	Eagle Five		O-in-ui Doksuri		
1963	Goryeojang		Goryeojang		
	The Mistress		Jageun-daek		
	An Aristocrat's Love Affair		Donbaram Nimbaram		
	Prince Hodong		Wangja Hodong		
1962	Revenge		Wonhanui Irwoldo		
	Want to Go Somewhere		Eodinji Gago Sipeo		
	A Lady in Black Gloves		Geomeun Janggab-ui Yeoin		
	King Dongmyeong		Sarang-ui Dongmyeong-wang		
	Her Love		Yeosim		
	A Woman Judge		Yeopansa		
	Mr. Gong		Gamnamugol Gongseobang		
	Body is Sad		Yukcheneun Seulpeuda		
	Affection		Jeong		
	Cool and Cold		Mujeong		
	New Wife		Saedaek		
	A New Recruit, Mr. Lee		Sinibsawon Mr. Lee		
	Memory of Red Roses		Bulgeun Jangmi-ui Chu-eok		
	A Man from Tokyo		Donggyeongseo On Sanai		
	Queen Dowager Inmok		Inmok Daebi		
	Training to Be a Couple		Gyeonseub Bubu		
	A Salaryman		Wolgeubjaeng-i		
1961	The Sea Knows		Hyeonhaetaneun Algo Itda		
	An Bar without Address		Beonji-eomneun Jmak		
1961	Dark Day		Baekju-ui Amheuk		
	On the Eve of the Liberation Day		Pariro Jeonya		
	Seong Chun-hyang		Seong Chun-hyang		
	Stars' Home		Byeorui Gohyang		
	A Rainbow		Mujigae		
	A Drifting Story		Pyoludo		
	A Song in My Heart		Naema-eum-ui norae		
	Two Women		Du yeo-in		
	Come bBack, My Bride!		Sinbu-yeo dol-a-ola		
	Your Voice		Geudae mogsori		
	Soil		Heulg		
	A Daughter		Ttal		
	A Forget-me-not		Mulmangcho		
	A Pearl Tower		Jinjutab		
	As You Please		Jemeosdaelo		
	Only Wives Should Cry?		Anaemani Ureoya Hana		
	Men vs. Women		Namseong Dae Yeoseong		
	Sorrow of Twilight		Hwanghonui Aesang		
	The Romantic Train		Nangmannyeolcha		
	Heartless		Bijeong		
	A Beautiful Woman		Areumdaun Yeoin		
	A Long Affection		Yujeongcheolli		
	Streets of the Sun		Taeyangui Geori		
	Always Thinking of You		Jana Kkaena		
	Independence Association and young Lee Seung-Man		Dongniphyeophoewa Cheongnyeon Lee Seung-man		
	The Flower		Hwasim		
	The Star of Lost Paradise		sequela		
	The Love Marriage		Ja-yugyeolhon		
	The Endless Tragedy		Jongmal-eobsneun bigeug		
1958	First Snow		Choseol		
	The River of Temptation		Yuhog-ui gang		
	The Seizure of Life		Insaengcha-ab		
	A College Woman's Confesses		Eoneu yeodaesaeng-ui gobaeg		
	The Unforgettable People		Ijeulsu eobneun saramdeul		
	A Lady of Freedom 2		Ja-yu bu-in		
1957	The Twilight Train		Hwanghon-yeolcha		
	The Lost Youth		Ilh-eobeolin cheongchun		
1957	A Woman's War		Yeoseongjeonseon		
	Touch-Me-Not		Bongseonhwa		
1956	Madame Freedom		Jayu buin		
	Prince Ho-Dong and Princess Nak-Rang		WangjaHodonggwa Nakranggongju		
	The Sadness of Heredity		Yujeon-ui aesu		
1955	Yangsan Province		Yangsando		
	Streets Under the Sun		Tae-yang-ui geori		

== Awards ==
- 1973 the 12th Grand Bell Awards: Best Supporting Actor for (열궁녀)
- 1980 the 19th Grand Bell Awards: Best Supporting Actor for (땅울림)
