= Shadowless Pagoda =

Shadowless Pagoda may refer to:

- Wuying Pagoda, a Buddhist pagoda in Wuchang, Wuhan, Hubei Province, China.
- Seokgatap, a Buddhist pagoda in Bulguksa, South Korea
- Shadowless Pagoda (film), a 1957 South Korean film
