= Dabotap =

Stone pagoda in Gyeongju, South Korea

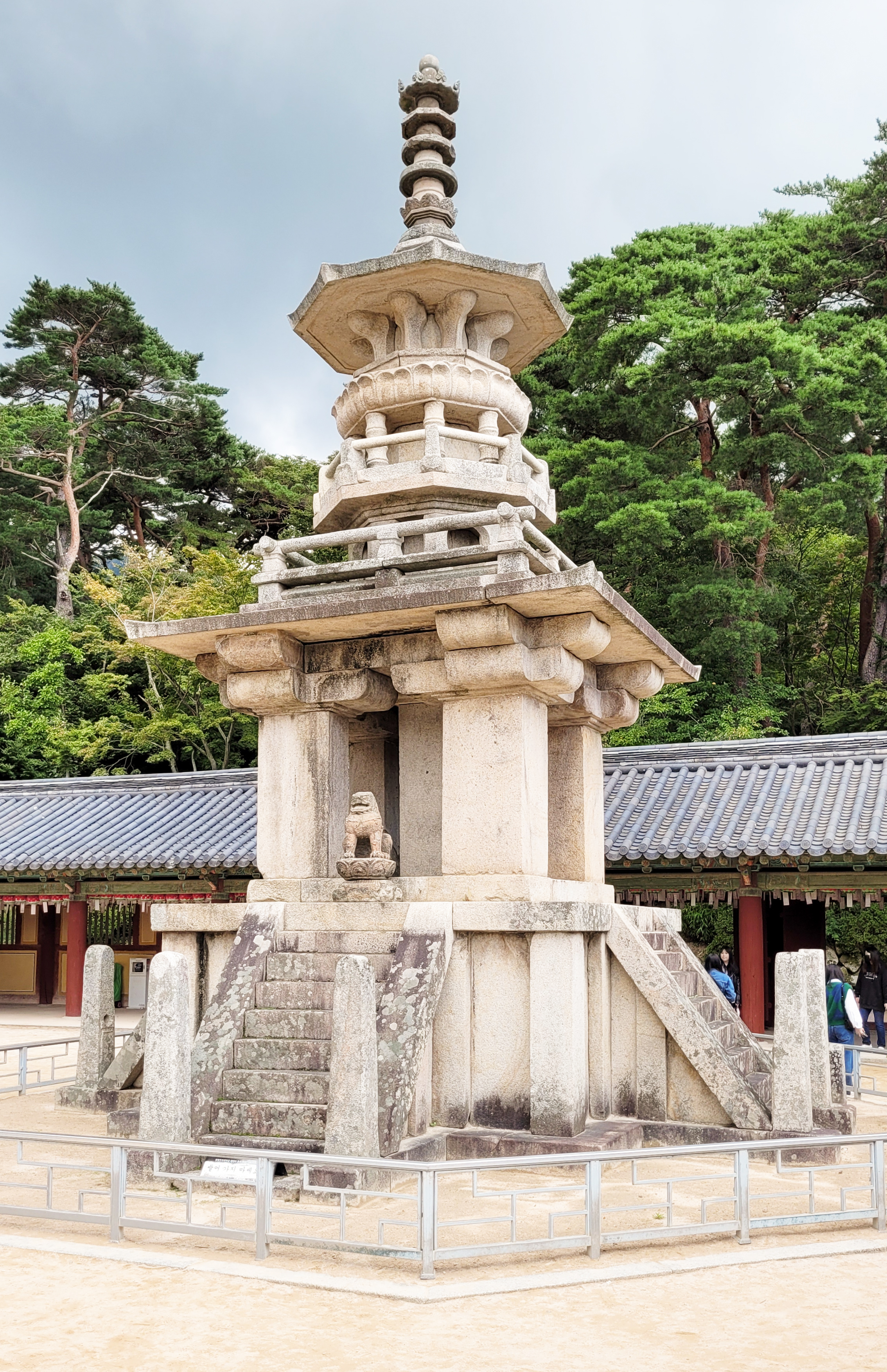
- The pagoda (2022)
- Year: 751
- Dimensions: 10.29 cm (4.05 in)
- Designation

National Treasure (South Korea)
- Designated: 1962-12-20
- Reference no.: 20
- Location: Gyeongju; 35.7900°N 129.3322°E

Korean name
- Hangul: 다보탑
- Hanja: 多寶塔
- RR: Dabotap
- MR: Tabot'ap

Dabotap (Korean: 다보탑) is a stone pagoda located in the Buddhist temple of Bulguksa in Gyeongju, South Korea. From entering the temple through the Cheongun and Baegun Bridge, Dabotap is located on the right side, opposing Seokgatap on the left side. The pagoda is supposed to have been built in 751, the 10th year of the Shilla king Gyeongdeok. It is currently designated as National Treasure no. 20.

The 3 story pagoda stands 10.29 m (33.8 ft) tall and was built in an ornate style not seen in other Buddhist countries. The sculpture techniques used are unique for its time and include delicate features.

It has a staircase on each of the four sides. Four stone square pillars support the pagoda's first roof, where is built a square stone railing. Inside the railing is the body of the pagoda, and above it, standing on the second octagonal-shaped roof surrounded by an octagonal stone railing, are eight bamboo-shaped stone pillars support the octagonal-shaped lotus stone carved with sixteen petals. Above it eight stone pillars support the third octagonal-shaped roof. Of the four stone lions guarding the top of the staircases only one remain. A second one is located at the British Museum in London. As for the whereabouts of the other two, they are still unknown. The pagoda was dismantled by the Japanese in the 1920s but there is no evidence of any relics found in the pagoda.

The pagoda is currently depicted on the obverse of the 10 won coin.

== Dabotap and Seokgatap ==
The two pagodas reflect a story in the Lotus sutra. Dabo (Prabhutaratna), a Buddha who had already achieved enlightenment, riding the Tower of Many Treasures, appeared to attest to the validity of Sakyamuni's sermons at Vulture Peak. Dabo and Sakyamuni then sat side by side within the tower. This pagoda represents the Dabo Buddha, while the other pagoda represents Sakyamuni. Dabo represents the objective truth, while Sakyamuni represents the subjective wisdom to realize it. Dabotap is highly decorative and looks feminine, whereas Seokgatap is highly simplified and looks more masculine. The sophisticated Dabotap symbolizes the complexity of the world; the simple Seokgatap represents the brevity of spiritual ascent. (from Fascinating Tales of Blooming Silla by Alexander Chang and Andrew Chang, 2006).

== Gallery ==
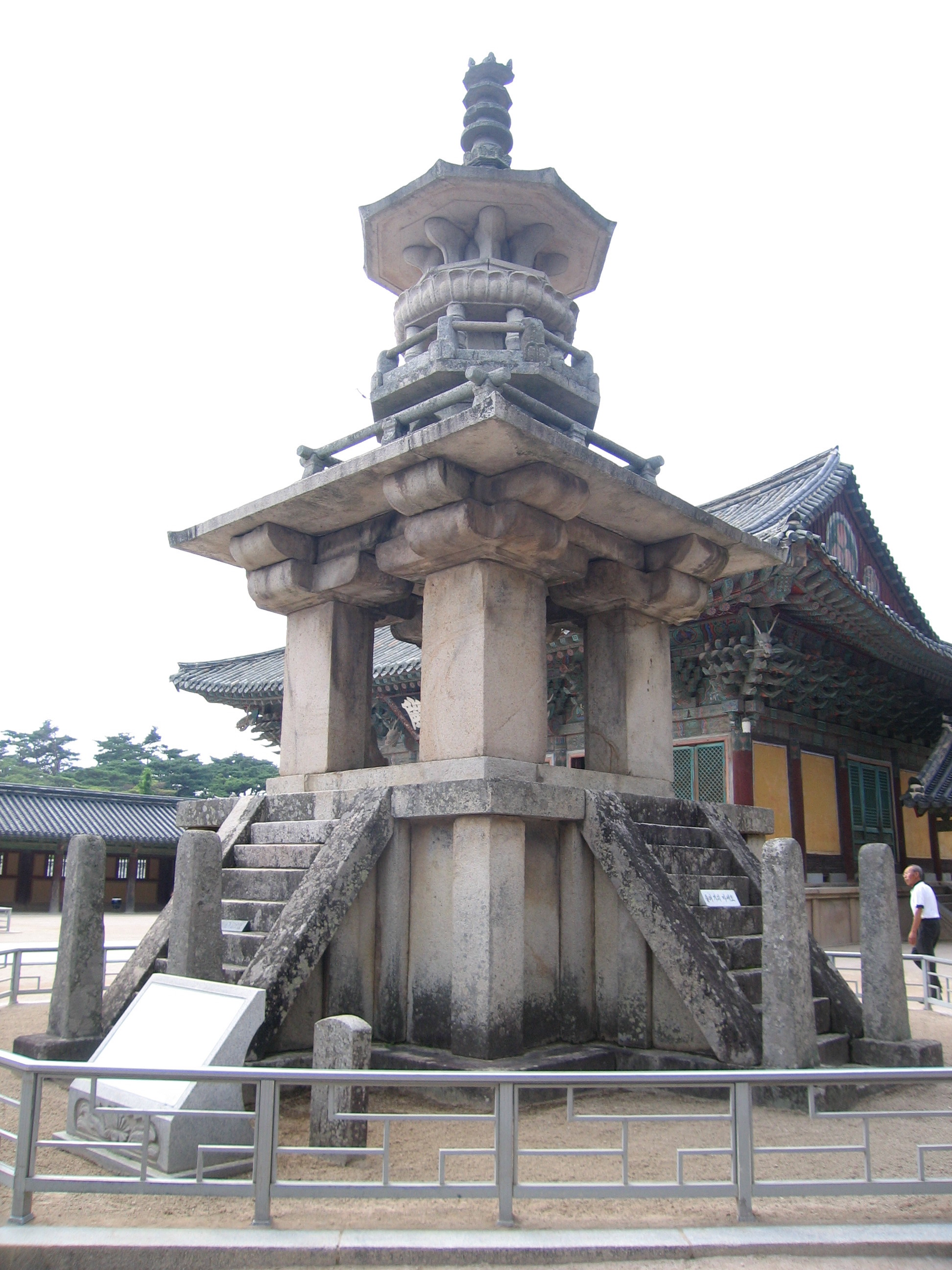

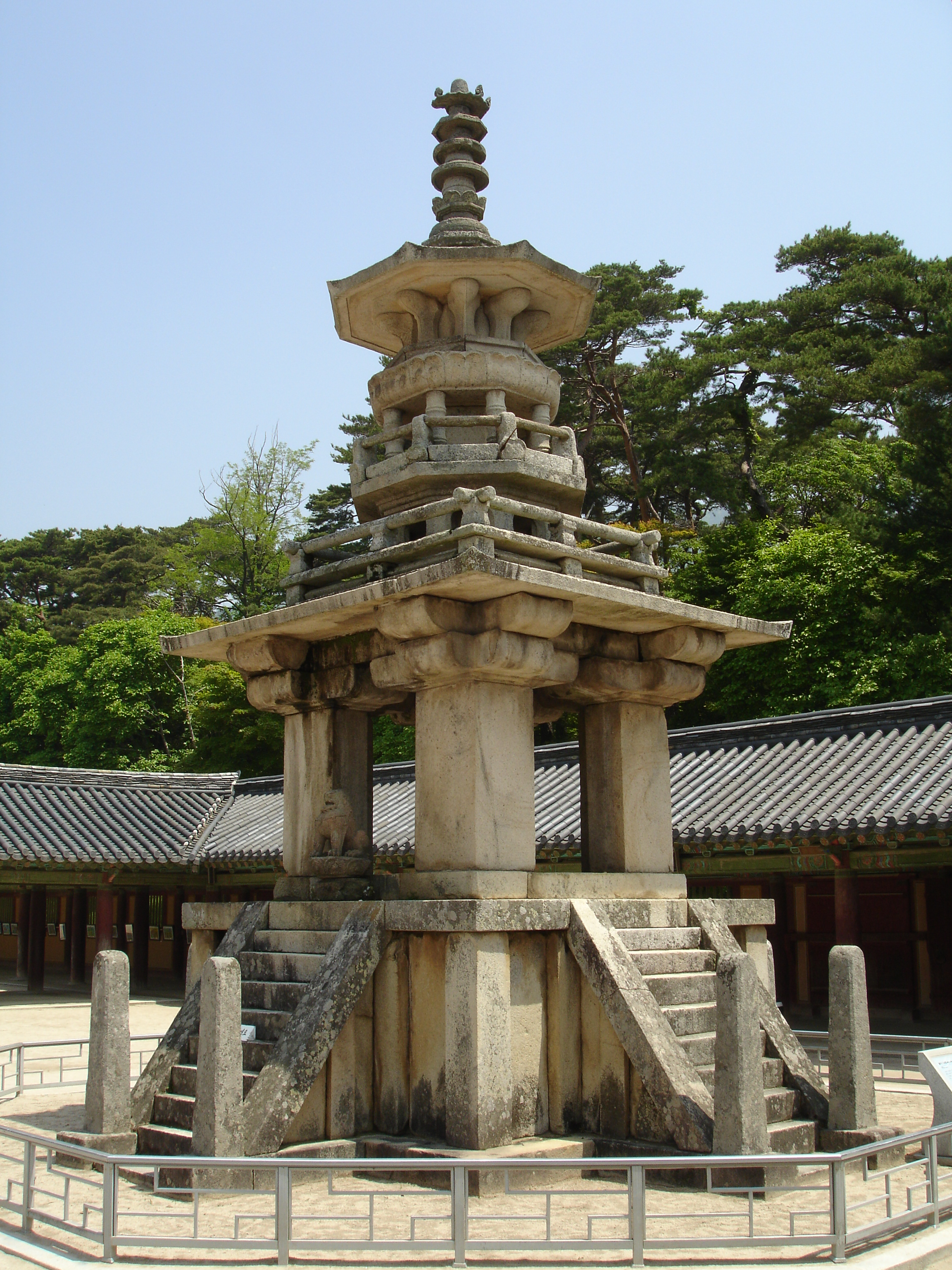

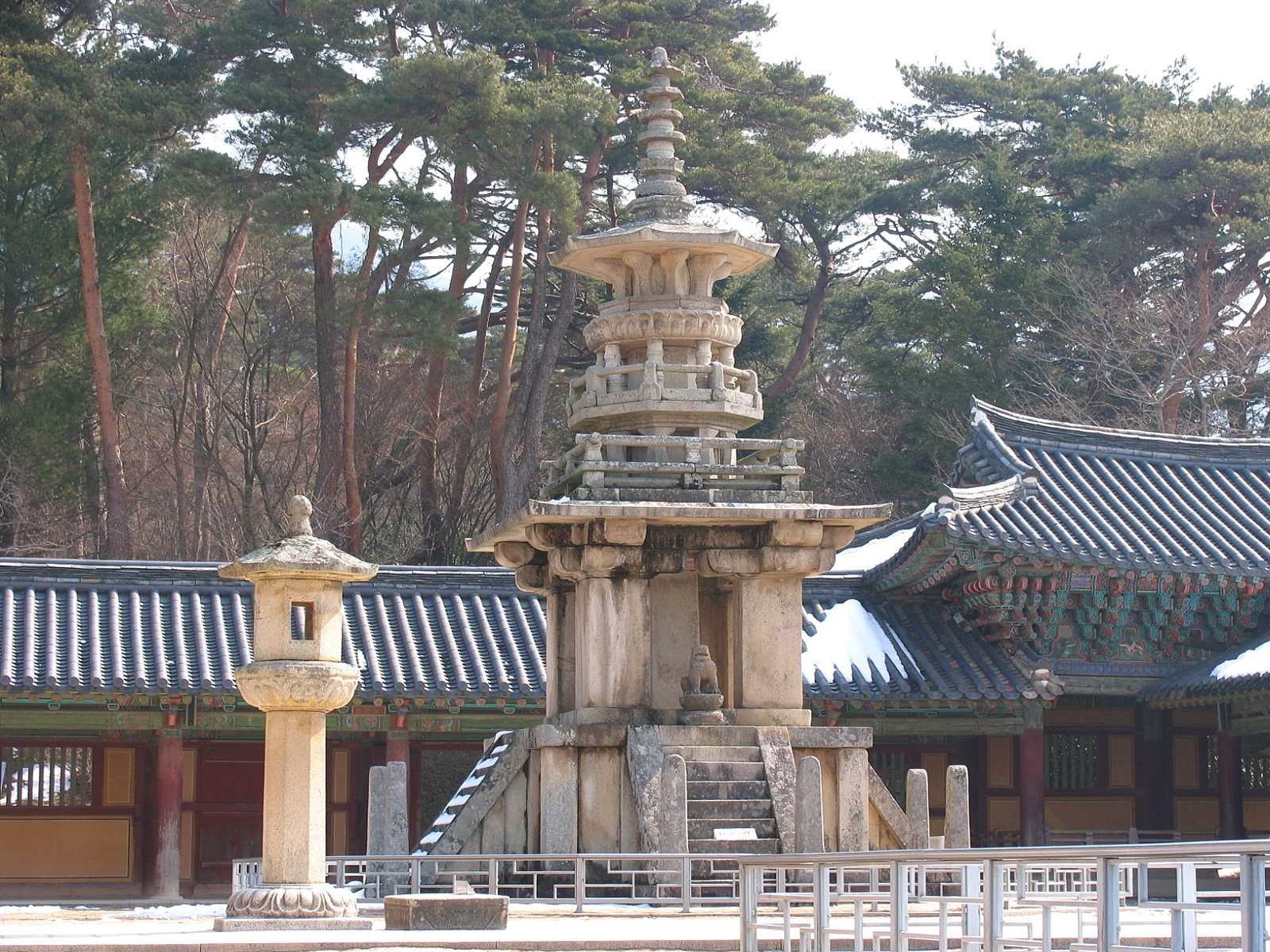

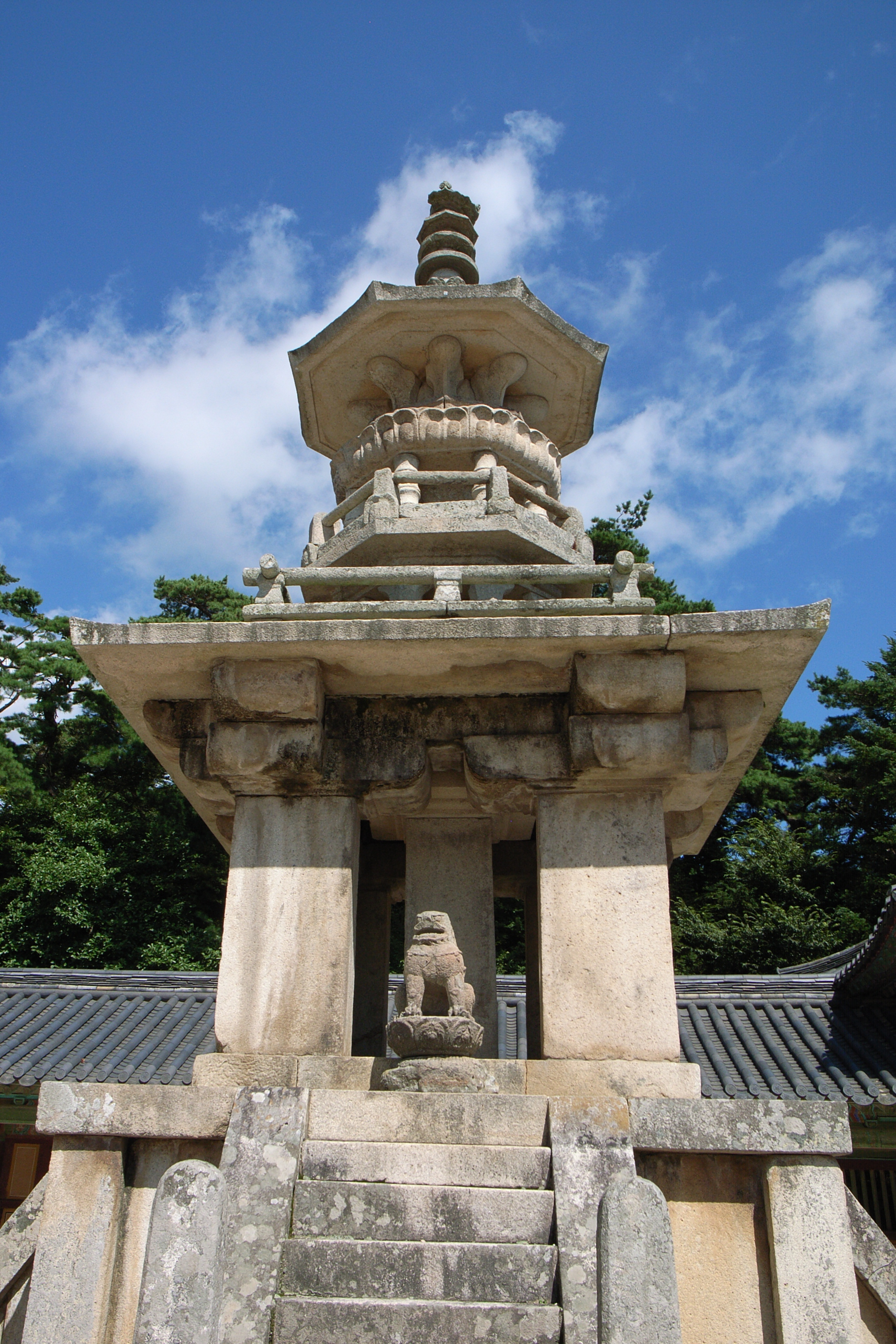

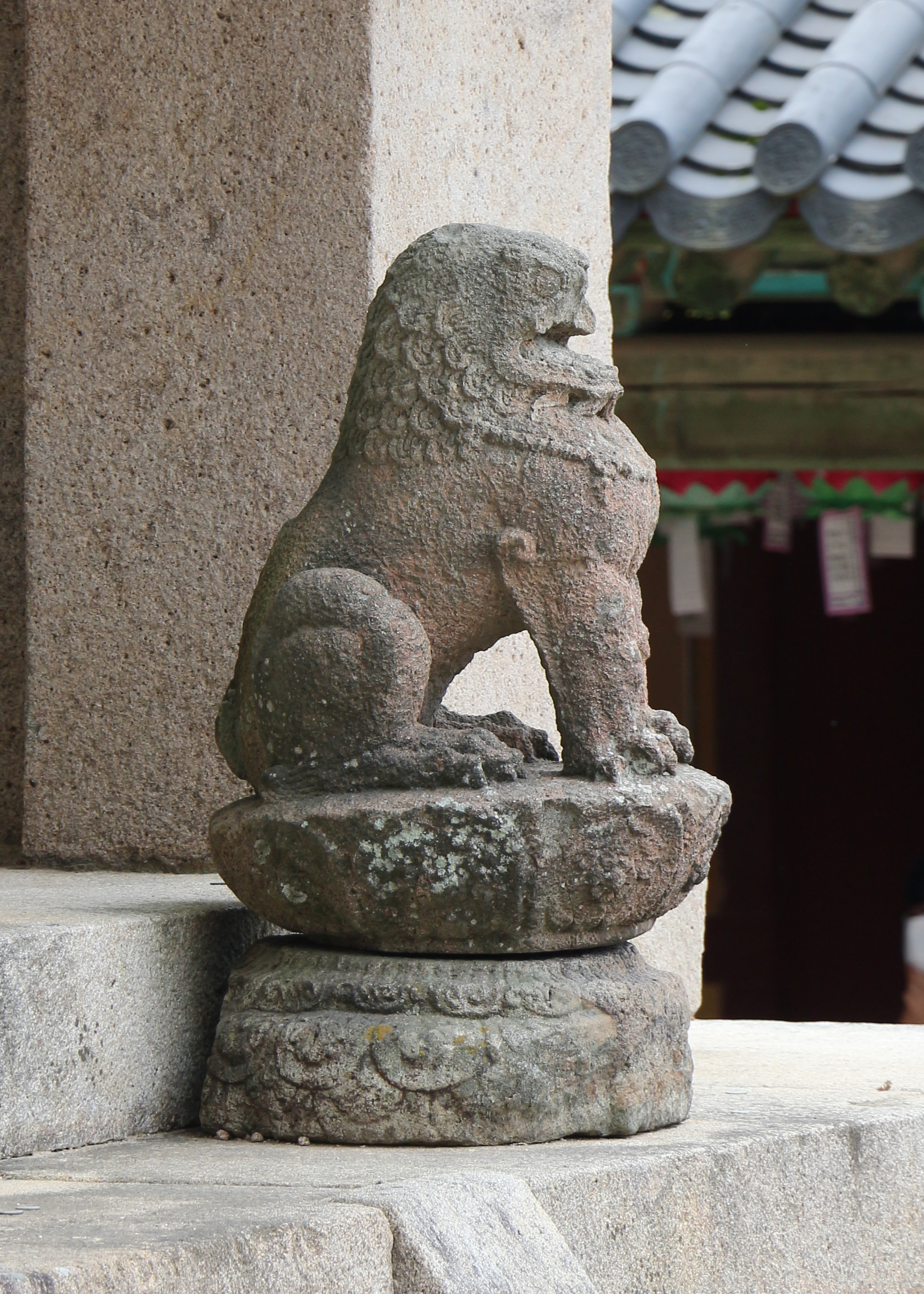

== See also ==
- National treasures of Korea
- Bulguksa Temple
- Shadowless Pagoda (film)
