= Dharani =

Genre of Buddhist mantras or incantations

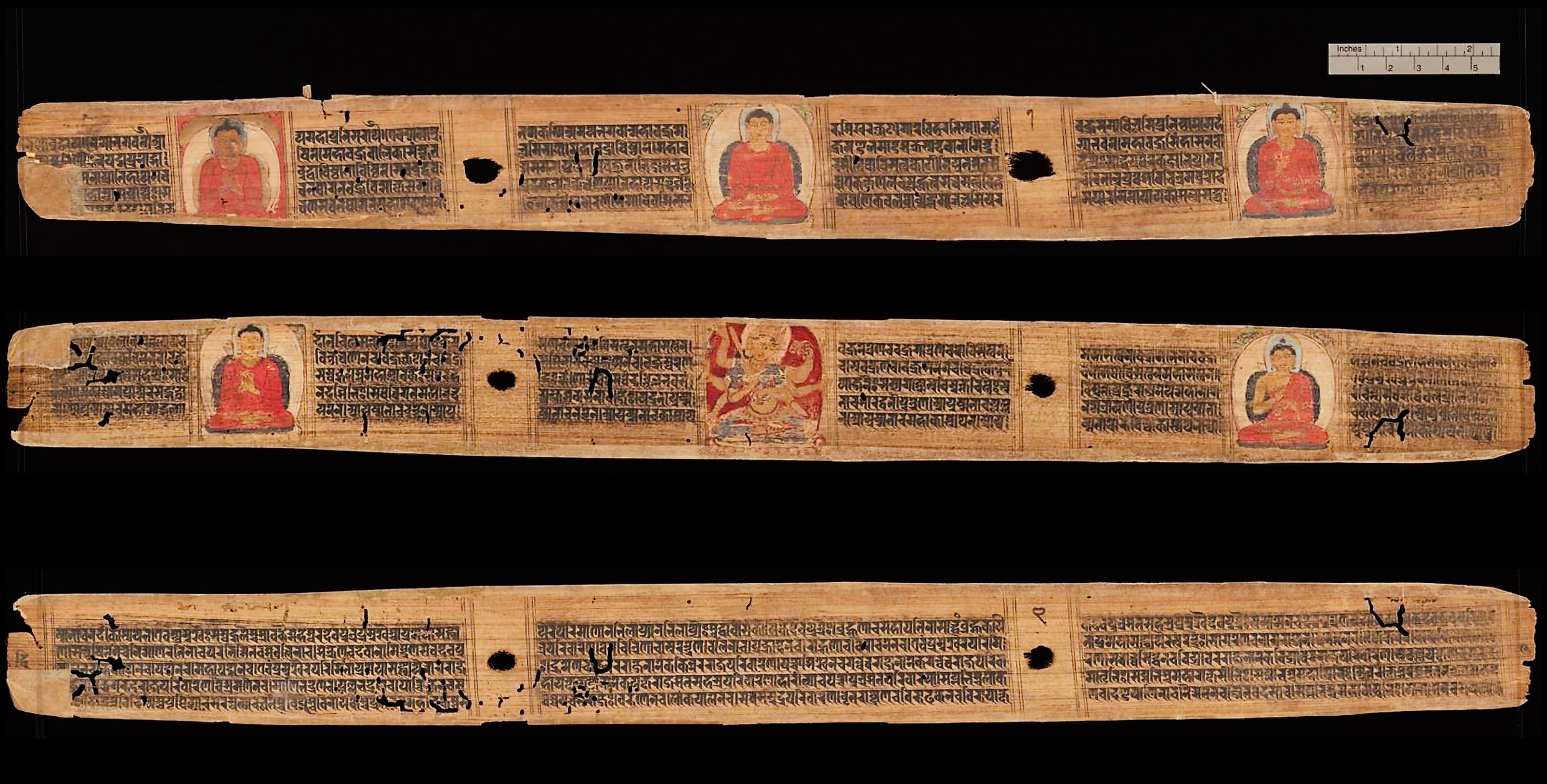
11th-century Buddhist Pancaraksa manuscript in Pāla script. It is a dharani genre text on spells, benefits and goddess rituals.

Dharanis (IAST: dhāraṇī), also known as (Skt.) vidyās and paritas or (Pal.) parittas, are lengthier Buddhist mantras that function as mnemonic codes, incantations, or recitations. Almost all were composed in Sanskrit, although there are some Pali dharanis. Believed to generate protection and the power to generate merit for the Buddhist practitioner, they constitute a major part of historic Buddhist literature. Most dharanis are in Sanskrit written in scripts such as Siddhaṃ as can be transliterated into Chinese, Korean, Japanese, Vietnamese, Sinhala, Thai and other regional scripts. They are similar to and reflect a continuity of the Vedic chants and mantras.

Dharanis are found in the ancient texts of all major traditions of Buddhism. They are a major part of the Pali canon preserved by the Theravada tradition. Mahayana sutras such as the Lotus Sutra and the Heart Sutra include or conclude with dharani. Some Buddhist texts, such as Pancarakṣa found in the homes of many Buddhist tantra tradition followers, are entirely dedicated to dharani. They are a part of the regular ritual prayers as well as considered to be an amulet and charm in themselves, whose recitation believed to allay bad luck, diseases or other calamity. They were an essential part of the monastic training in Buddhism's history in East Asia. In some Buddhist regions, they served as texts upon which the Buddhist witness would swear to tell the truth.

The dharani-genre of literature became popular in East Asia in the first millennium CE, with Chinese records suggesting their profusion by the early centuries of the common era. These migrated from China to Korea and Japan. The demand for printed dharani among the Buddhist lay devotees may have led to the development of textual printing innovations. The dharani records of East Asia are the oldest known "authenticated printed texts in the world", state Robert Sewell and other scholars. The early-eighth-century dharani texts discovered in the Bulguksa of Gyeongju, Korea are considered as the oldest known printed texts in the world. (Note: These are widely accepted as the oldest mass printed texts, but they are not the oldest known inscriptions or single-copy handwritten manuscript scroll. The Pyrgi Tablets, for example, are texts inscribed on three gold sheets found in Santa Marinella in 1964 and these date to about 500 BCE.)

Dharani recitation for the purposes of healing and protection is referred to as Paritta in some Buddhist regions, particularly in Theravada communities. The dharani-genre ideas also inspired Buddhist chanting practices such as the Nianfo (Chinese: 念佛; Pinyin: niànfó; Rōmaji: nenbutsu; RR: yeombul; Vietnamese: niệm Phật), the Daimoku, as well as the Koshiki texts in Japan. They are a significant part of the historic Chinese dazangjing (scriptures of the great repository) and the Korean daejanggyeong – the East Asian compilations of the Buddhist canon between the 5th and 10th centuries.

== Etymology and nomenclature ==
A dharani example

Tuṭṭe, tuṭṭe–vuṭṭe, vuṭṭe–paṭṭe, paṭṭe–kaṭṭe, kaṭṭe–amale,
amale–vimale, vimale–nime, nime–hime, hime–vame,
[...]
sarkke-cakre, cakre–dime, dime–hime, hime–ṭu ṭu ṭu ṭu–
ḍu ḍu ḍu ḍu–ru ru ru ru–phu phu phu phu–svāhā.

— Buddha to monk Mahamati, in Laṅkāvatāra Sūtra 9.260
Translator: D. T. Suzuki

The word dhāraṇī derives from a Sanskrit root √dhṛ meaning "to hold or maintain". This root is likely derived from the historical Vedic religion of ancient India, where chants and melodious sounds were believed to have innate spiritual and healing powers even if the sound cannot be translated and has no meaning (as in a music). The same root gives dharma or dhamma. According to the East Asian Buddhism studies scholar Paul Copp, some Buddhist communities outside India sometimes refer to dharanis with alternate terms such as "mantra, hṛdaya (hridiya), paritrana (paritta), raksha (Pali: rakkha), gutti, or vidyā" though these terms also have other contextual meanings in Buddhism.

According to the traditional belief in Tibetan texts, states José Ignacio Cabezón, there were three councils and the term dharani was recorded and became the norm after the third council. The first council, according to this belief, compiled the sūtrānta, the Vinaya and the Abhidharma in Vimalabhada to the south of Rajagriha in India. The first council was held in the year Buddha died, but the compiled dhamma consisted of spoken words that were not written down. The second council occurred about 200 years after the death of the Buddha in a grove provided by Ashoka, where the knowledge was compiled again, but it too did not write anything down. The third council gathered in Kashmir a century later, according to the Tibetan tradition, and the teachings were put down in writing for those "who had not obtained the power (dharani) of not-forgetting" because people were reciting corrupted forms of the teachings of the Buddha. In this context, dharani were acknowledged in the Buddhist tradition by about the second century BCE, and they were a memory aid to ground and remember the dharma teachings.

== Description ==
The term dharani as used in the history of Mahayana and tantric Buddhism, and its interpretation has been problematic since the mid-19th century, states Ronald Davidson. It was initially understood as "magical formula or phrase", but later studies such as by Lamotte and Berhard interpreted them to be "memory", while Davidson proposes that some dharani are "codes". According to Eugène Burnouf, the 19th-century French Indologist and a scholar of Buddhism, dharanis are magical formulas that to Buddhist devotees are the most important parts of their books. Burnouf, states Davidson, was the first scholar to realise how important and widespread dharani had been in Buddhism sutras and Mahayana texts. The Indologist Moriz Winternitz concurred in the early 20th century that dharanis constituted a "large and important" part of Mahayana Buddhism, and that they were magic formulae and "protective spells" as well as amulets.

Benefits of chanting a dharani

[For one reciting this Great Peacock Spell], there will be no fear of kings’ [capricious punishment], no fear of thieves or of fire, or of death by drowning. Nor will poison afflict his body, nor weapons, and he will live long and prosper, only excepting the results of prior karma. And he will awake happy from dreams. He will be content, not experience a catastrophe, lead a life lacking terror, his enemies destroyed, his opponents ruined, himself untouched, freed from fear of any poison, living long and prosperously, only excepting the results of prior karma.

— Buddha to monk Svati, in Mahamayuri 58.20–59.6
Translator: Ronald Davidson

According to Winternitz, a dharani resembles the incantations found in the Atharvaveda and Yajurveda of Hinduism. The dharani-genre of Buddhist literature includes mantra, states Étienne Lamotte, but they were also a "memory aid" to memorize and chant Buddha's teachings. This practice was linked to concentration (samadhi) and believed to have magical virtues and a means to both spiritual and material karma-related merit making. According to Braarvig, the dharanis are "seemingly meaningless strings of syllables". While they may once have been "memory aids", the dharanis that have survived into the modern era do not match with any text. In later practice, the dharanis were "hardly employed as summaries of doctrine, but were employed as aids to concentration and magical protection benefits".

According to Jan Nattier, Vedic mantras are more ancient than Buddhist dharani, but over time they both were forms of incantations that are quite similar. In the early texts of Buddhism, proposes Nattier, "it would appear that the word dharani was first employed in reference to mnemonic devices used to retain (Skt. "hold") certain elements of Buddhist doctrine in one's memory". In Nattier's view, the term dharani is "peculiar to Buddhism". A dhāraṇī can be a mnemonic to encapsulate the meaning of a section or chapter of a sutra. According to the Buddhism-related writer Red Pine, mantra and dharani were originally interchangeable, but at some point dhāraṇī came to be used for meaningful, intelligible phrases, and mantra for syllabic formulae which are not meant to be understood.

According to Robert Buswell and Ronald Davidson, dharani were codes in some Buddhist texts. They appeared at the end of the text, and they may be seen as a coded, distilled summary of Buddhist teachings in the chapters that preceded it. For example, the Vajrasamadhi-sutra – a Korean Buddhist text likely composed in the 7th century by an unknown monk, one important to the Chan and Zen Buddhist tradition in East Asia, the Dharani chapter is the eighth (second last), with a brief conversational epilogue between the Tathagata Buddha and Ananda being the last chapter. This dharani chapter, states Buswell, "encodes (dharayati) the important meanings, without forgetting them, and it reminds and codes the points to remember.

The Indologist Frits Staal who is known for his scholarship on mantras and chants in Indian religions, states the Dharani mantras reflect a continuity of the Vedic mantras. He quotes Wayman to be similarly stressing the view that the Buddhist chants have a "profound debt to the Vedic religion". The Yogacara scholars, states Staal, followed the same classification as one found in the Vedas – arthadharani, dharmadharani and mantradharani, along with express acknowledgment like the Vedas that some "dharani are meaningful and others are meaningless" yet all effective for ritual purposes.

=== History ===
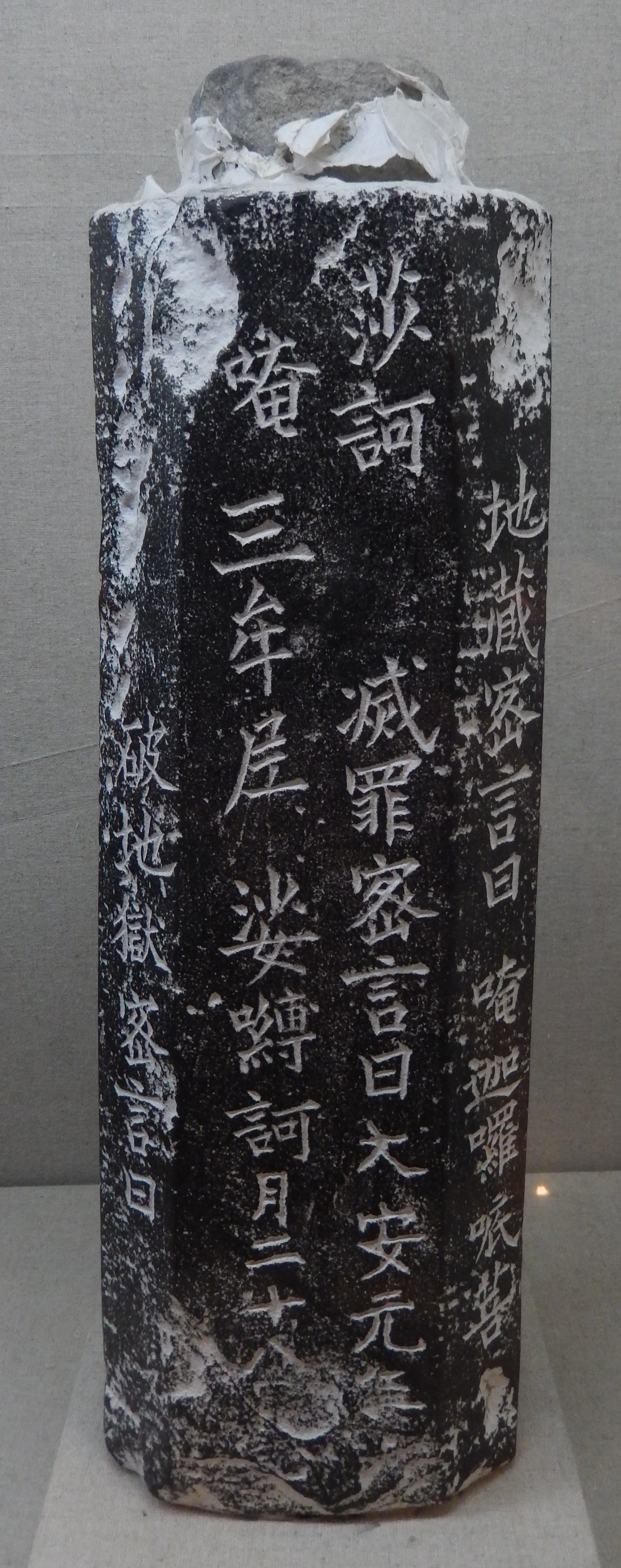
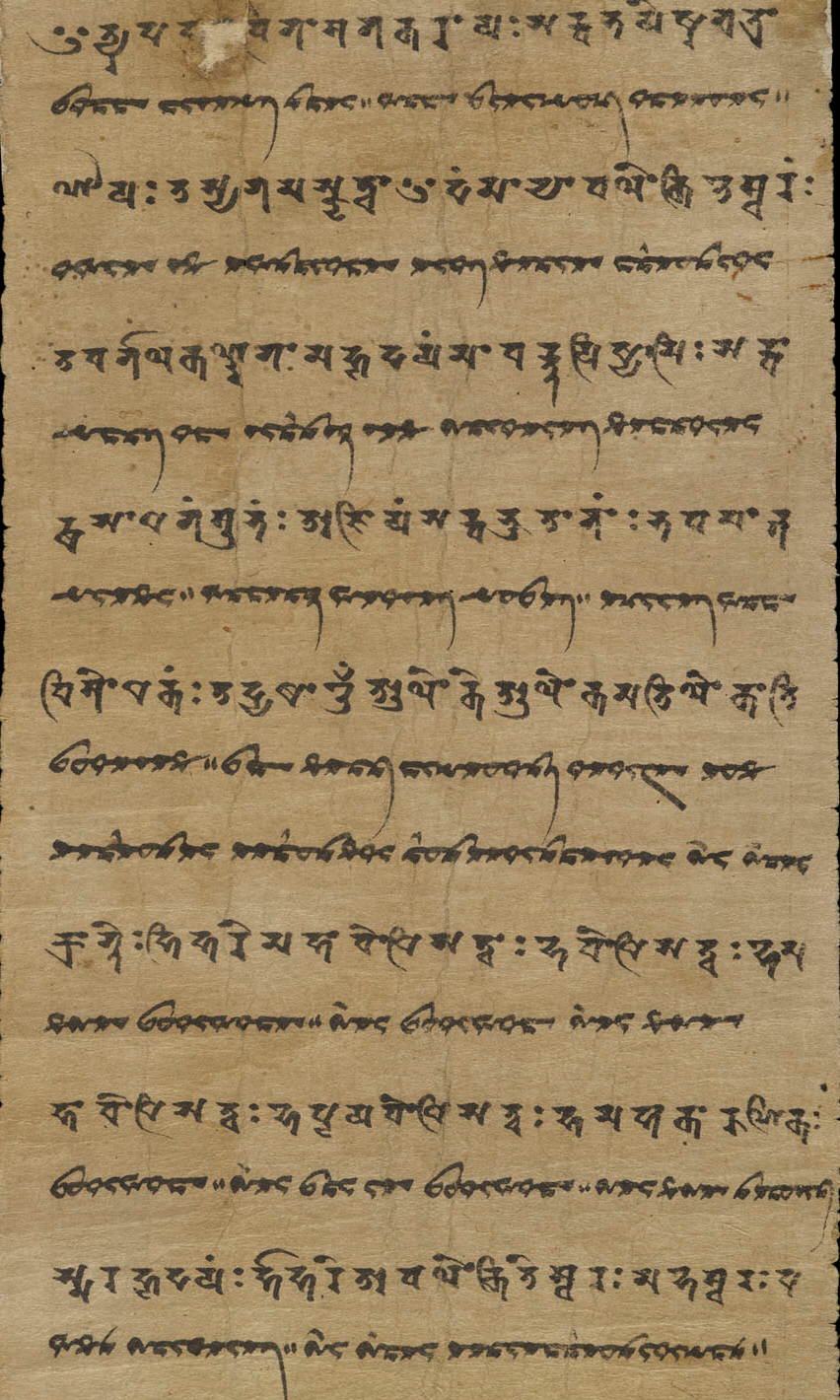
Left: A dharani pillar, inner Mongolia (1085 CE); Right: a dharani written in two languages – Sanskrit and central Asian Sogdian.

The early Buddhism literature includes the dharani spells and incantations. It demonstrates that dharanis were valued and in use within Buddhist communities before the 1st century CE, state Charles Prebish and Damien Keown.

The role of dharanis in Buddhist practice of mid-1st-millennium CE is illustrated by numerous texts including the systematic treatises that emerged. According to Paul Copp, one of the earliest attestable literary mandate about writing dharanis as an effective spell in itself is found in a Chinese text dated between 317 and 420 CE. This text is the Qifo bapusa suoshuo da tuoluoni shenzhou jing (or, Great Dharani Spirit-Spell Scripture Spoken by the Seven Buddhas and Eight Bodhisattvas). The Collected Dhāraṇī Sūtras, for example, were compiled in the mid-seventh century. Some of the oldest Buddhist religious inscriptions in Stupas (Dagoba, Chörten) are extracts from dharani-genre compositions such as the Bodhigarbhalankaralaksa-dharani. (Note: According to Max Muller and Bunyiu Nanjio, the "dharanis, besides being preserved in manuscripts, is of frequent occurrence as an inscription in Buddhist countries.") Manuscript fragments of Sumukha-dharani discovered in Central Asia and now held at the Leningrad Branch of Russian Academy of Sciences are in the Sanskrit language and the Brahmi script, a script that was prevalent before the early centuries of the common era.

The Chinese text Wugou jing guangda tuoluoni jing of the influential Empress Wu's era – 683 to 705 CE – is about the Buddha reciting six dharanis. The first part states its significance as follows (Japanese version of the Chinese text):

People who wish to perform the ceremony for it should, on the 8th, 13th, 14th or 15th day of the month, walk round and round the pagoda containing the relics a full seventy-seven times, with it on their right, reciting this charm [dhāraṇī] also seventy-seven times: they should build an altar and keep its surface clean. They should have the charm copied out seventy-seven times, and out of respect for the ceremony should give the copyist perfume, flowers, food and drink, clean clothes and a bath, and reward him either by anointing and covering him with perfumes or by giving him much money, or by paying him according to his ability. Then they should take these copies of the charms, place them inside the pagoda, and make offerings at the pagoda. Alternatively they should make seventy-seven small clay pagodas, place one copy inside each, and make offerings. If they duly perform this, people who are about to die will prolong their lives to old age, all their previous sins and evil deeds being completely destroyed.

— Muku joko darani kyo (無垢浄光大陀羅尼經), Transl: Peter Kornicki

Early mentions of dharani in the European literature are from the records left by John of Plano Carpini (1245–7) and William of Rubruck (1254) where they wrote in their respective memoirs that Uighurs and Mongols chanted "Om man baccam", later identified with "Om mani padme hum". They also mention that these Asians write "short sorcery sentences on paper and hang them up". Other than such scant remarks, little was known about the Dharani-genre of literature or its value in Buddhism till the mid-19th-century colonial era, when Brian Hodgson began buying Sanskrit and related manuscripts in Nepal, Tibet and India for a more thorough scholarship, often at his personal expense. According to Hodgson, as quoted by Ronald Davidson, dharani were esoteric short prayers "derived from [Buddhist tantric] Upadesa" that are believed to be amulet to be constantly repeated or worn inside little lockets, something that leads to "a charmed life".

The colonial era scholarship initially proposed that the dharanis and related rituals may have been an influence on Buddhism of other Indian religions such as from the esoteric tantra traditions of Hinduism around the mid-1st-millennium CE. This assumption, along with the view that early Buddhism was an "abstract philosophy or even a broad-based social movement" is now a part of a scholarly debate. With increased access to the primary texts of Buddhism and the discoveries of historical manuscripts in China, Korea and Japan, such as those about early Silla Buddhism, McBride and others state that dharani incantations and ritualism had widespread significance in East Asia from the early years. (Note: The early hypothesis of dharani entering Buddhist texts later was shared by Asian scholars such as Daisetz Teitarō Suzuki who wrote in 1932 while translating the Lankavatara sutra that the dharani were "another later addition probably when dharani was extensively taken into the body of Buddhist literature just before its disappearance from the land of its birth" [14th-century India]) Coupled with Waddell's scholarship on the "dharani cult in Buddhism" in the early 20th century, the post-colonial era scholarship proposed that dharanis did not develop with or after tantric Buddhism emerged, but preceded it and were a form of proto-tantrism.

According to Richard McBride, as well as Richard Payne, the "proto-tantra" proposal too is problematic because it is a meaningless anachronistic teleological category that "misleads" and implies that the dharanis somehow anticipated and nurtured Buddhist tantra tradition. There is no evidence for such a sequential development. Instead, the evidence points to an overlap but that the significance of the dharanis in mainstream Buddhist traditions and the esoteric Buddhist tantra tradition co-existed independent of each other. Phonic mysticism and musical chanting based on dharanis – parittas or raksas in the Theravada Pali literature (Note: According to Joseph Kitagawa, Atanatiya Suttanta (DN 32) illustrates such apotropaic formulae in the Pali canon.) – along with related mantras were important in early Buddhism. They continue to be an essential part of actual Buddhist practice in Asia, both for its laypersons and the monks. The emerging evidence and later scholarship increasingly states that "dharani and ritual procedures were mainstream Mahayana practices" many centuries before the emergence of tantric and esoteric Buddhism and Vajrayana, states McBride. The Buddhist tantra traditions added another layer of sophistication and complexity to the rituals with deities and mandalas.

Dharanis are not limited to an esoteric cult within Buddhism, states Paul Copp, rather the "dharani incantations and related mystic phrases and practices have been integral parts of nearly all Buddhist traditions since at least the early centuries of the common era".

=== Dhāraṇīs and mantras ===
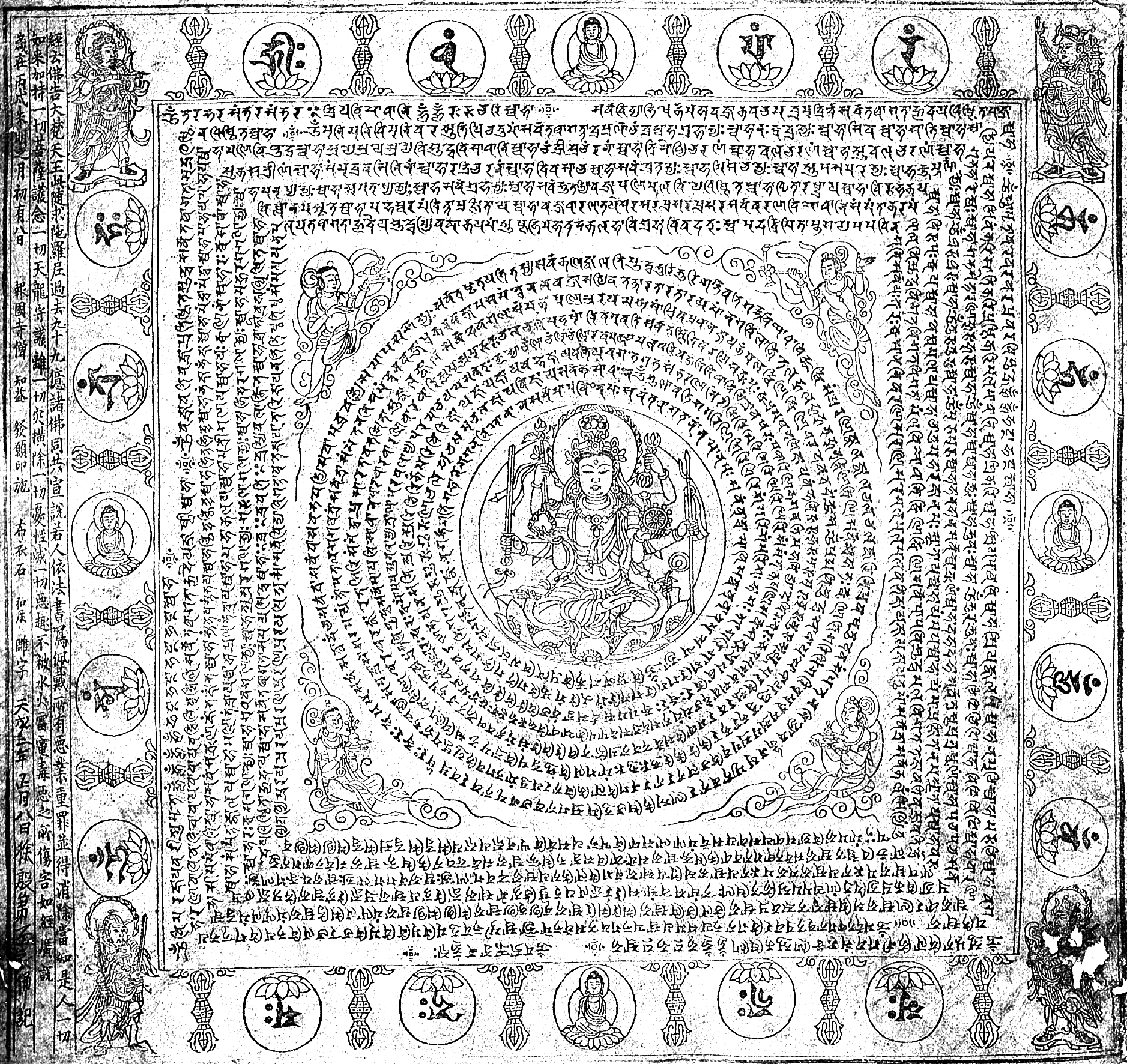
Chinese Buddhism's dharani iconography with Siddhaṃ script in Sanskrit, Later Tang, 927 CE

Dhāraṇīs are a form of amulet and believed in the various Buddhist traditions to deliver protection from malign influences and calamities. Mantra and dharani are synonymous in some Buddhist traditions, but in others such as the Tibetan tantric traditions a dharani is a type of mantra. According to Jose Cabezon, in the tantric traditions, mantra (sngags) is all knowledge and the mind of all the Buddhas, that which possesses the dharma-dhatu (essence of dhamma). The mantra exist in three forms – guhya (secret), vidya (knowledge) dharani (memory aid). The guhya mantra are about male deity and female deity relationships and union. The vidya mantra represent the mind of male Buddhist deities, while dharani mantras of the female Buddhist deities. Theologically, the vidya mantras constitute that knowledge in tantric Buddhism, according to Cabezon, which "pacifies the suffering experienced in the existential world (samsara) and the heaps of faults such as desire". The dharani mantras, in contrast, constitute that knowledge in tantric Buddhism which "causes one to hold onto the dhamma, to remember the dhamma, to remember virtue". There is very little prescriptive or practical difference between dharani and mantras except that dharani are much longer, states Eugene Burnouf.

Ushnisha-vijaya-dharani (Son-shio-da-ra-ni), leaf 9 of Prajnaparamita Hridaya Sutra Manuscripts transl: Max Muller and Bunyiu Nanjio (Note: The Sanskrit language is the source language of sacred dharani chants in Buddhism in many other scripts. For example, the discoveries of dharani fragments by Duan Yuquan show that the ancient Buddhist Tangut people also transliterated Sanskrit, rather than translate the hymn into their own language.)
Sanskrit hymn:	नमस्त्रैलोक्य	बुद्धाय	भगवते	द्यथा	ओम् (ॐ)	[...]
Chinese transliteration as a dharani:	No-ma-shitsutanrei-ro-kiya	botsu-da-ya	ba-ga-baku-tei	tetsuya-ta	'an	[...]
Japanese transliteration from Chinese:	Nau-ma-shitsutarei-ro-kiya	bo-da-ya	ba-giya-ba-tei	niya-ta	won	[...]
English-IAST:	Namas trailokya	buddhāya	bhagavate	dyathā	Om	[...]

According to Winternitz, a Buddhist dharani resembles the incantations and mantras found in Hinduism. A dharani may contain simple magical syllables and words without any literal meaning (mantra-padani), or its power is believed to result from it containing words or wisdom in nunce from a Buddhist Sutta. The Japanese Horiuzi manuscript of Prajna paramita hrdaya sutra and Usnisha Vijaya dharani dated to 609 CE illustrate both, with the latter being only invocations consisting of meaningless series of syllables. In Buddhism, a dharani has been believed to have magical virtues and a means to earn merit to offset the past karma, allay fear, diseases and disasters in this life, and for a better rebirth. To the lay Buddhist communities, states Davidson, the material benefits encouraged the popularity and use of dharanis for devotionalism, rituals and rites in Buddhism. According to Janet Gyatso, there is a difference between mantras and dharanis. The mantras are more than melodious sounds and have meaning, and these were found sporadically in pre-Mahayana Buddhism. With the emergence of the Mahayana Buddhism tradition, the dharanis became closely related to mantras. Later, as the Vajrayana Buddhism tradition grew, they proliferated. The dharanis and mantras overlap because in the Vajrayana tradition. There exist "single seed-syllable bija like dharanis, treated as having special powers to protect chanters from dangers such as "snakes, enemies, demons and robbers". The bija (seed) mantra condenses the protective powers of a Buddhist deity or a Buddhist text into a single syllable. For example, the single letter "a" (अ) condenses the 100,000 verses of the Prajna-paramita sutras into a single syllable.

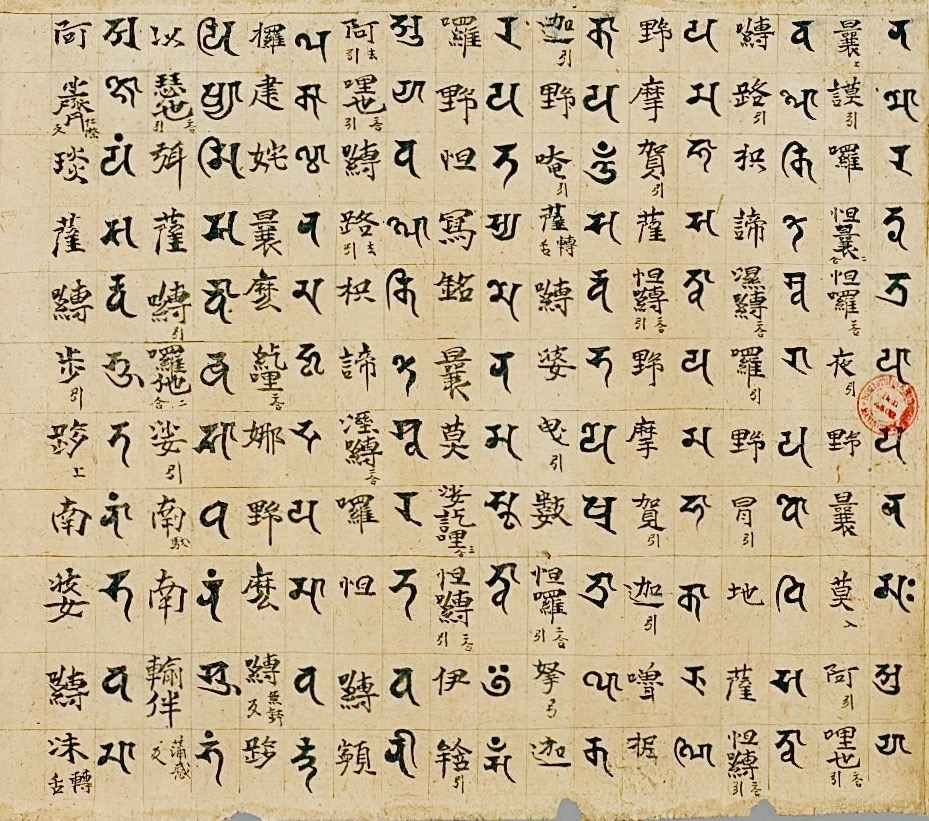
Indian Siddham script to Chinese script transliteration code in Nilaṇṭhanāmahṛdaya dhāraṇī.

The Japanese Buddhist monk Kōbō Daishi drew a distinction between dhāraṇī and mantra and used it as the basis of his theory of language. According to Kōbō Daishi, a Buddhist mantra is restricted to esoteric Buddhist practice whereas dhāraṇī is found in both esoteric and exoteric rituals. In the Nara and early Heian period of Japanese history, a monk or nun was tested for their fluency and knowledge of dharanis to confirm whether they are well trained and competent in Buddhist knowledge. Their appointment letters listed the sutras and dharanis that he or she could recite from memory. In an appointment recommendation letter dated 732 CE, as an example, a Japanese priest named Chishu supports the ordination of his student Hata no kimi Toyotari by listing that he can recite following dharanis: "the Greater Prajna-paramita, Amoghapasa Avalokiteshvara, Eleven-faced Avalokiteshvara, the Golden Light, Akashagarbha, Bhaisajyaguru, consecrating water, concealing ritual space" with the dharani rituals of prostration after eight years of training. A study of numerous such ubasoku koshinge recommendation letters from the 1st-millennium Japan confirm that dharanis were an essential and core part of monastic training, though the specific group of dharanis memorized by a monk or nun varied.

Kōbō Daishi classified mantras as a special class of dhāraṇīs and argued that every syllable of a dhāraṇī was a manifestation of the true nature of reality – in Buddhist terms, that all sound is a manifestation of śūnyatā or emptiness of self-nature. Thus, rather than being devoid of meaning, Kūkai suggests that dhāraṇīs are in fact saturated with meaning – every syllable is symbolic on multiple levels.

=== Mahayana tradition ===
Usnidha Sitatapatra dharani
Sanskrit mantra, siddham-dharani chant with commentary (135 secs)

Usnidha Sitatapatra dharani
Tibetan chant of a dharani (30 secs)

The dharanis have been a large and important part of Mahayana Buddhist literature. They are particularly abundant in the esoteric tradition of Buddhism (Vajrayana, Tibetan). However, the dharanis were not unique to esoteric Mahayana texts. The most significant and popular Mahayana sutras such as the Lotus Sutra, Heart Sutra and others prominently include dharani chapters. The dharanis are prominent in the Prajñāpāramitā Sutras wherein the Buddha "praises dharani incantation, along with the cultivation of samadhi, as virtuous activity of a bodhisattva", states Ryûichi Abé.

The Megha-Sutra is an example of an ancient Mahayana magico-religious text. In it, the snake deities appear before the Buddha and offer him adoration, then ask how the suffering of snakes, as well as people, can be alleviated. The text suggests friendliness (maitri) and lists numerous invocations such as those to female deities, exorcisms, means to induce rains, along with a series of magical formulae such as "sara sire sire suru suru naganam java java jivi jivi juvu juvu etc.", states Moriz Winternitz. The historic Mahayana dharanis have survived as single manuscripts as well as large collections. The versions found in Nepal and China include spells to end sickness, lengthen life, recovery from poison, magic for luck in war, drive away demons and snakes, protection from the effects of ill-omened constellations, release from a confessed sin, birth of a son or daughter to a woman wanting a baby, rebirth into Sukhāvatī or avoiding a bad rebirth. The snake-charm dharani is found in the Bower Manuscript found in Western China. While a 443 CE Chinese translation of Lankavatara Sutra does not contain some of the dharani chapters, other Chinese translations dated to the 2nd century and 4th century CE of Mahayana texts do contain dharanis. The Dunhuang manuscript collections include extensive talismanic dharani sections. The dharanis as conceptualized by medieval era Buddhist intellectuals and eminent Chinese monks were an "integral component of mainstream Sinitic Buddhism", states Richard McBride. The popularity of Buddhist spells in China was probably because older native Chinese religions valued spells already.

According to Robert Buswell and Donald Lopez, it is "almost certain" that some of the East Asian Buddhist literature on dharani were indigenous Chinese texts and syncretic with the Daoist practices. For example, the Guanding jing composed in mid-5th century in China is largely a collection of magical spells in the dharani-genre in twelve semi-independent chapters. It includes spells such as those of the 72,000 spirit kings to protect Buddhist monks, spells of the 120,000 spirit kings to protect the Buddhist nuns, incantations of spirit kings to protect one's surroundings, seals and spells to subdue devils, chants to summon dragon kings to treat infections and remove pests, and seeking rebirth in pure lands of one's desire.

The significance of dharanis was such that both the government and monastic organization had stipulated, by the 7th century, how and when dharanis may or may not be used. A ritsuryo code for Buddhist clerics dated 718 CE, promulgated by the Nara government in Japan, forbid the use of dharani for any unauthorized medical treatment, military and political rebellion. The code explicitly exempted their use for "healing of the sick by chanting dharanis in accordance with the Buddha dharma". Another document dated 797 CE mentions "healer-meditation masters" (kanbyo zenji) in dharanis to protect the family of the ruler. Others evidence the use of dharani chanting by monks and nuns as "one of the common methods of healing during the Nara period", states Ryûichi Abé.

The dharanis were an essential part of the rokujikyoho (six-syllable sutra) liturgy ritual in Japan. They were greatly popular between the 11th and 15th centuries and a part of comprehensive solution to various ailments, a ritual performed by Buddhist monks and practitioners of onmyōdō.

In Chinese Buddhism, some important dharanis include Ten Small Mantras, the Heart Sutra, the Great Compassion Mantra and the Shurangama Mantra.

=== Theravada tradition ===
The Theravada Paritta texts are a type of the Dharani texts, providing protective charm through chanting of hymns. According to Buddhist studies scholars Sarah LeVine and David Gellner, Theravada lay devotees traditionally invite the monks into their homes for rites of "protection from evil" and the monk(s) chant the paritrana hymns. These rituals are particularly common during rites-of-passage ceremonies such as baby naming, first rice-eating and others. According to Buddhologist Karel Werner, some Mahayana and Vajrayana dharani texts influenced the paritta texts of Theravada tradition, such as the Gini (fire) Paritta, as the hymns are identical in parts and the Theravada text uses the same terms, for example, "dharani dharaniti".

The Pali canon makes many references to protective (raksha, paritta) incantations and magical spells. These invocations provide protection from "malignant spirits, disease and calamity". For example, in Digha Nikaya (DN I.116.14), Sonadanda remarks that wherever the Buddha stays, "non-humans do not harm the people of that town or village", states the Buddhism scholar Peter Skilling. This and similar statements are also found in the early Chinese translations of Indian Buddhist texts. According to Skilling, these "protective Buddhist literature" are used by both the monks and the laypeople of Theravada countries. These texts are a part of any "meagre library of Buddhist Sri Lankan households" and they are called Pirit Pota. In Myanmar, all classes of the Theravada community more widely know about the paritta incantation literature than any other Pali Buddhist work. The average Theravada monk in other southeast Asian countries who may not know much about a Tipitaka, states Skilling, is likely to "be able to recite numerous chants [paritta, dharani] from memory".

In northern Thailand, the Suat Boek Phranet (lit. Eye-Opening Sutta) is a Pali chant text used during rites such as the consecration of a Buddha image. The text, states Donald Swearer, includes a "unique dharani in praise of the Buddha" and his victory over the evil Mara. Though the dharani appears at the end of the text and the associated chant in Thai Buddhist practice occurs at the close of the ceremony, they highlight their key role in "the buddhabhiseka ritual".

== Influence: oldest printed texts in the world ==
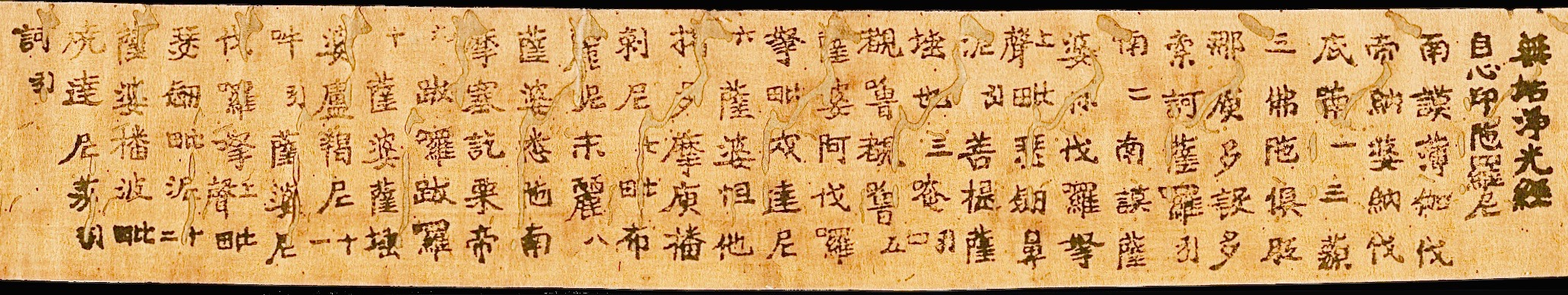
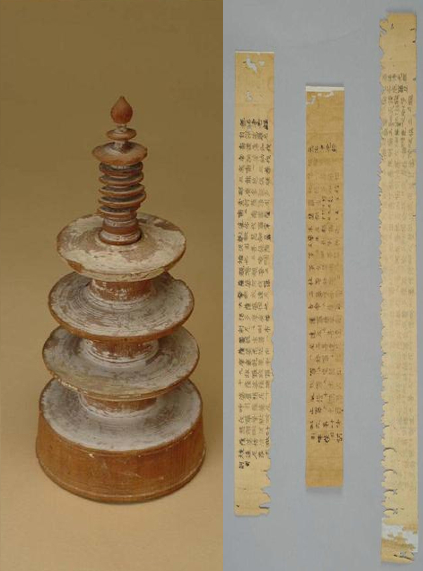
Hyakumantō Darani: miniature wooden pagoda containing a printed dharani, dated 770 CE. In 1908 there were 43930 pagodas extant in the Hōryū-ji temple in Nara.

The Buddhist dharani invocations are the earliest mass printed texts that have survived. The earliest extant example of printing on paper is a fragment of a dhāraṇī miniature scroll in Sanskrit unearthed in a tomb in Xi'an, called the Great spell of unsullied pure light (Wugou jingguang da tuoluoni jing 無垢淨光大陀羅尼經). It was printed using woodblock during the Tang dynasty, c. 650–670 AD. Another print, the Saddharma pundarika sutra, is dated to 690 to 699. This coincides with the reign of Wu Zetian, under which the Longer Sukhāvatīvyūha Sūtra, which advocates printing apotropaic and merit making texts and images, was translated by Chinese monks. The oldest extant evidence of woodblock prints created for the purpose of reading are portions of the Lotus Sutra discovered at Turpan in 1906. They have been dated to the reign of Wu Zetian using character form recognition.

The Hyakumantō Darani found as charms in wooden pagodas of Japan were broadly accepted as having been printed between 764 and 770 CE. In 1966, similarly printed dharani were discovered in stone pagoda of Pulguksa temple in Gyeongju, Korea. These are dated to the first half of the 8th century. According to Tsien Tsuen-Hsuin, the Korean dharani scrolls were printed after the era of Empress Wu in China, and these date "no earlier than 704 CE, when the translation of the sutra was finished, and no later than 751, when the building of the temple and stupa was completed". The printed Korean text consists of "Chinese characters transliterated from the [Indian] Sanskrit". While the Korean dharani were likely printed in China, (Note: Scholars disagree on whether the evidence implies these were printed in Korea or China.) the evidence confirms that the Japanese dharani were printed in Japan from Buddhist chants that arrived through China. The tradition of printing and distributing the Buddhist dharanis, as well as transliterated Sanskrit sutras, continued in East Asia over the centuries that followed. By the 9th century, the era of mass printing and the sale of books had begun covering additional subjects such as "astrology, divination of dreams, alchemy, and geomancy".

According to languages and ancient manuscripts scholar Ernst Wolff, "it was Buddhism, above all, that eminently stimulated and sustained printing activities". Its chants and ideas were in demand in East Asia, and this led to the development of wood-block based mass printing technology. The oldest known dharanis were mass-produced by the 8th century, and later in the 10th century the canonical Tripitaka in addition to 84,000 copies of dharanis were mass printed.

The 8th-century dharanis are the "oldest authenticated printed texts in the world", states Robert Sewell. These were mass-produced as a set consisting of miniature hollow wooden pagodas each containing a printed dharani prayer or charm in Sanskrit on thick paper strips. The Japanese records (Note: These are the Shoku Nihongi records. According to the British Library Treasures collection archival notes, "The Hyakumantō darani or ‘One Million Pagoda Dharani’ are the oldest extant examples of printing in Japan and one of the earliest in the world. The eighth-century Japanese chronicle the Shoku Nihongi records that they were printed between 764 and 770 on the orders of Empress Shōtoku as an act of atonement and reconciliation following the suppression of the Emi Rebellion led by Fujiwara no Nakamaro in 764.") state a million dharanis were so produced and distributed through Buddhist temples by the order of Empress Shōtoku – previously a Buddhist nun – after an attempted coup against her court. According to Ross Bender, these events and Empress Shōtoku's initiatives led to the founding of major new Buddhist temples, a "great acceleration" and the "active propagation of Buddhism" in Japan. Empress Shōtoku's million dharanis are among the oldest known printed literature in the world.

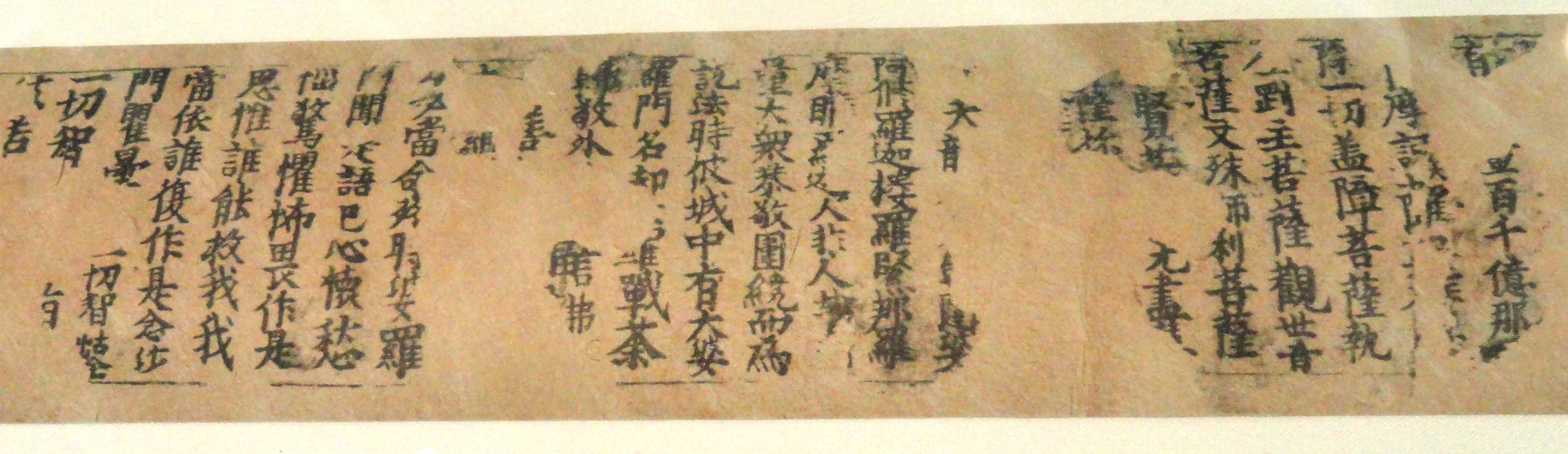
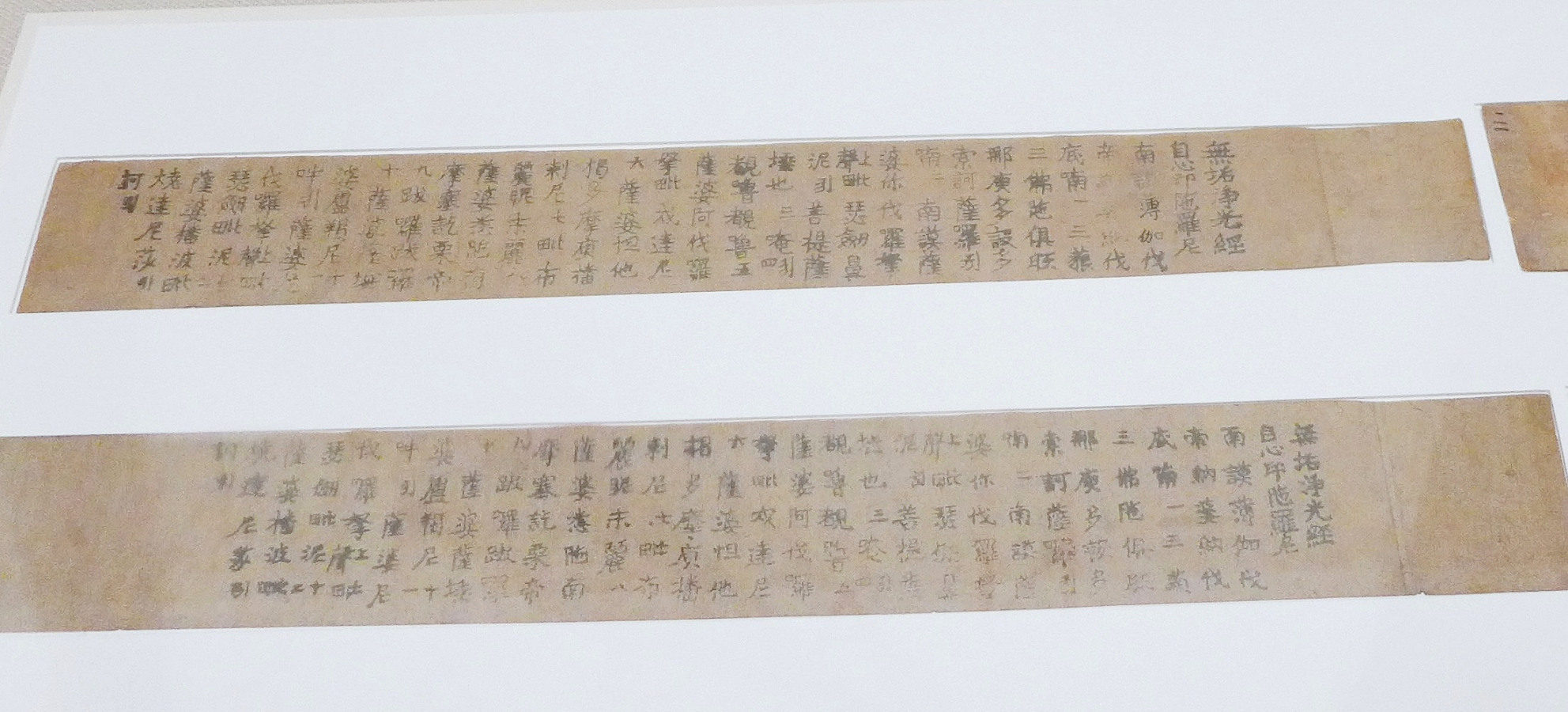
The dharani are the oldest known printed texts in the world, preserved in Buddhist pagodas. Left: Korea (early 8th-century, a copy at the Incheon Seoul airport), Right: Japan (764–770 CE). Language: Sanskrit, Transliterated script: Chinese.

== Texts ==
While dharanis are found inside major texts of Buddhism, some texts are predominantly or exclusively of the dharani-genre. Some illustrations include,

1. Amoghapasha-hrdaya
2. Atanatika sutra
3. Bhaisajya vastu
4. Buddha namasahasra
5. Manjushrinama samghiti
6. Ekadashamukha hridaya
7. Ganapati hridaya
8. Hayagriva vidya
9. Karunapundarika
10. Mahamayuri
11. Mahamantranusarini
12. Mahamegha-sutra
13. Mahapratisara dharani
14. Mahasahasrapra mardini
15. Mahasitavati dharani
16. Mekhala dharani
17. Nirvikalpa pravesha dharani
18. Ratnaketu parivarta
19. Saddharma pundarika
20. Sanmukha dharani
21. Sardulakarna vadana
22. Sarvajnatakara dharani
23. Sarvatathagatadhisthana
24. Suvarna bhasottama
25. Usnisa-vijaya dharani
26. Vajravidarani dharani
27. Vasudhara dharani
28. Pancaraksha
29. Arban burqan-u
30. Sitatapatra dharani
31. Arvis dharani
32. Cayan sikurtei

=== Theravada collections ===
The Theravada compilations of paritta (dharani) are ancient and extensive. Some are a part of various suttas, while others are dedicated texts. Illustrations include:

1. Ratana sutta
2. Khandha paritta
3. Mora paritta
4. Mora paritta
5. Dhajagga paritta
6. Atanatiya paritta
7. Angulimala paritta
8. Metta sutta
9. Suvatthi paritta
10. Isigili paritta
11. Bojjhanga paritta
12. Mangala sutta
13. Pubbamha sutta
14. Vatta sutta
15. Culabyuha sutta
16. Mahasamaya sutta
17. Jaya paritta
18. Abhinha sutta
19. Akaravatta sutta
20. Dharana sutta
21. Chadisapala sutta
22. Cakkaparitta sutta
23. Parimittajala sutta
24. Atthavisati paritta Jinapanjara gatha
25. Jayamangala gatha
26. Atthamangala gatha
27. Uppatasanti
28. Gini paritta
29. Mahadibbamanta
30. Yot brahkandatrai pitaka
31. Atamatiya paritta
32. Catubhanavara

== See also ==
- Ye Dharma Hetu
- Cundī Dhāraṇī
- Eleven-Faced Avalokitesvara Heart Dharani Sutra
- Litany
- Nīlakaṇṭha Dhāraṇī
- Śūraṅgama Mantra
- Tangut dharani pillars
- Uṣṇīṣa Vijaya Dhāraṇī Sūtra
