= Viśuddhaprabhā Dhāraṇī =

8th-century Buddhist ritual scripture

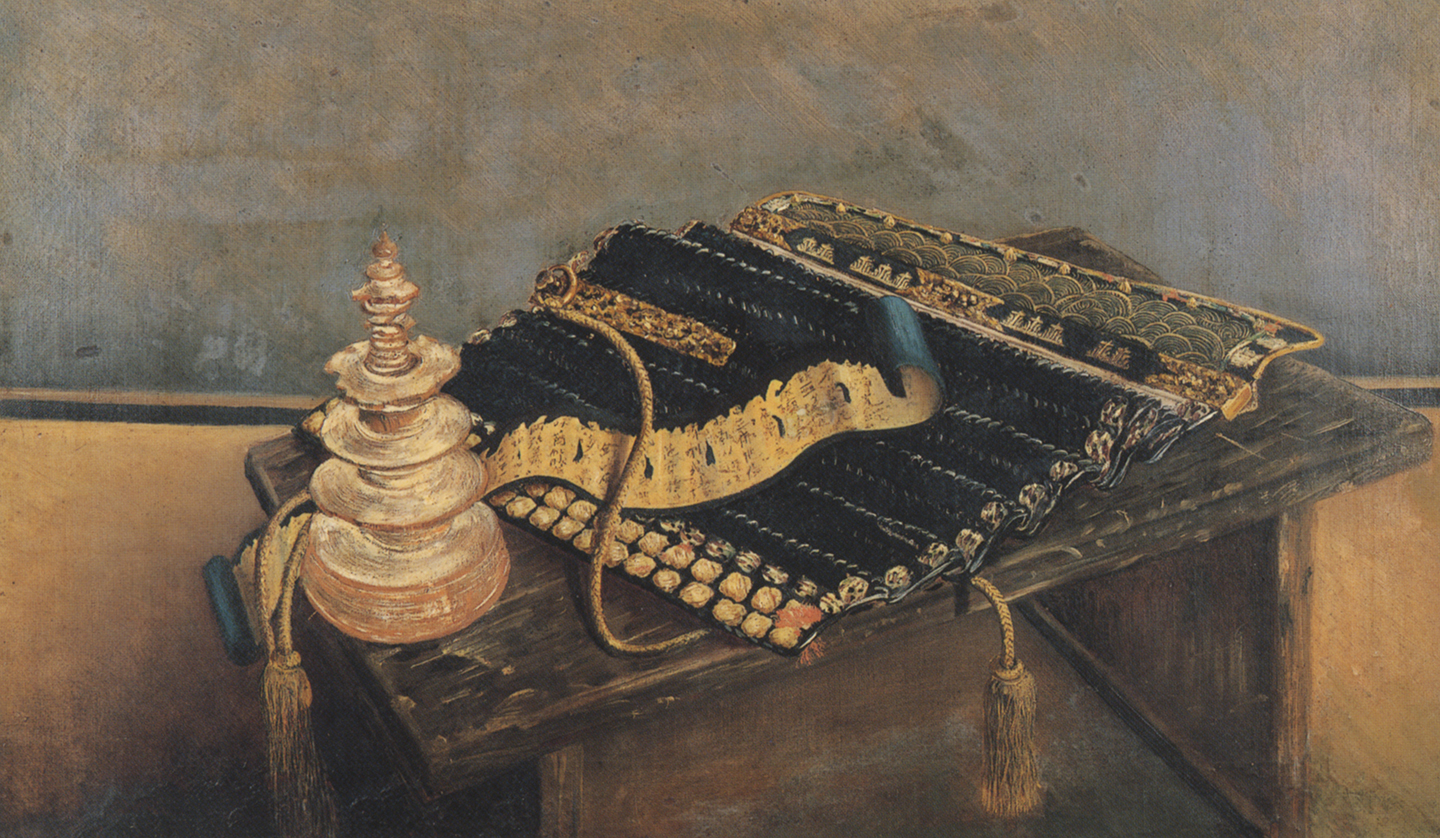
A painting by Takahashi Yuichi depicting a printed Viśuddhaprabhā Dhāraṇī scroll and a small pagoda.

The Viśuddhaprabhā Dhāraṇī (Dhāraṇī of Pure Light), also known by its full title Raśmi-vimala-viśuddhaprabhā-dhāraṇī (The Dhāraṇī of the Pure Stainless Light Rays; Chinese: Wugou Jing Guang Da Tuoluoni 無垢淨光大陀羅尼; Korean: Mugujeonggwangdaedaranigyeong 무구정광대다라니경(無垢淨光大陀羅尼經); T 1024), is a Buddhist ritual text belonging to the dhāraṇī genre of protective and transformative formulas. This text is preserved in multiple versions and sutras within the Tibetan Kanjur and Chinese Buddhist canons. The dhāraṇī centers on the worship of Amitāyuṣ (the Buddha of Infinite Life) and the invocation of Viśuddhaprabhā (Pure Light), a goddess which personifies Amida's compassionate light. Its main function is the purification of karma, healing, the extension of lifespan (āyuṣ), and the assurance of rebirth in Sukhāvatī, Amida's Pure Land. This dhāraṇī was cited by the Japanese Pure Land Buddhist scholar Genshin as part of thirteen texts conducive to birth in the Pure Land.

The Viśuddhaprabhā Dhāraṇī became popular during the 8th century, and it quickly spread throughout East Asia due to the use of woodblock printing. It was widely employed in Korean Buddhism during the middle and late Silla (668–935), as well as in Japan during the same time. The Great Dhāraṇī Sūtra, a Korean copy of the Dhāraṇī, is considered to be one of the oldest printed texts in the world.

== The Dhāraṇī ==
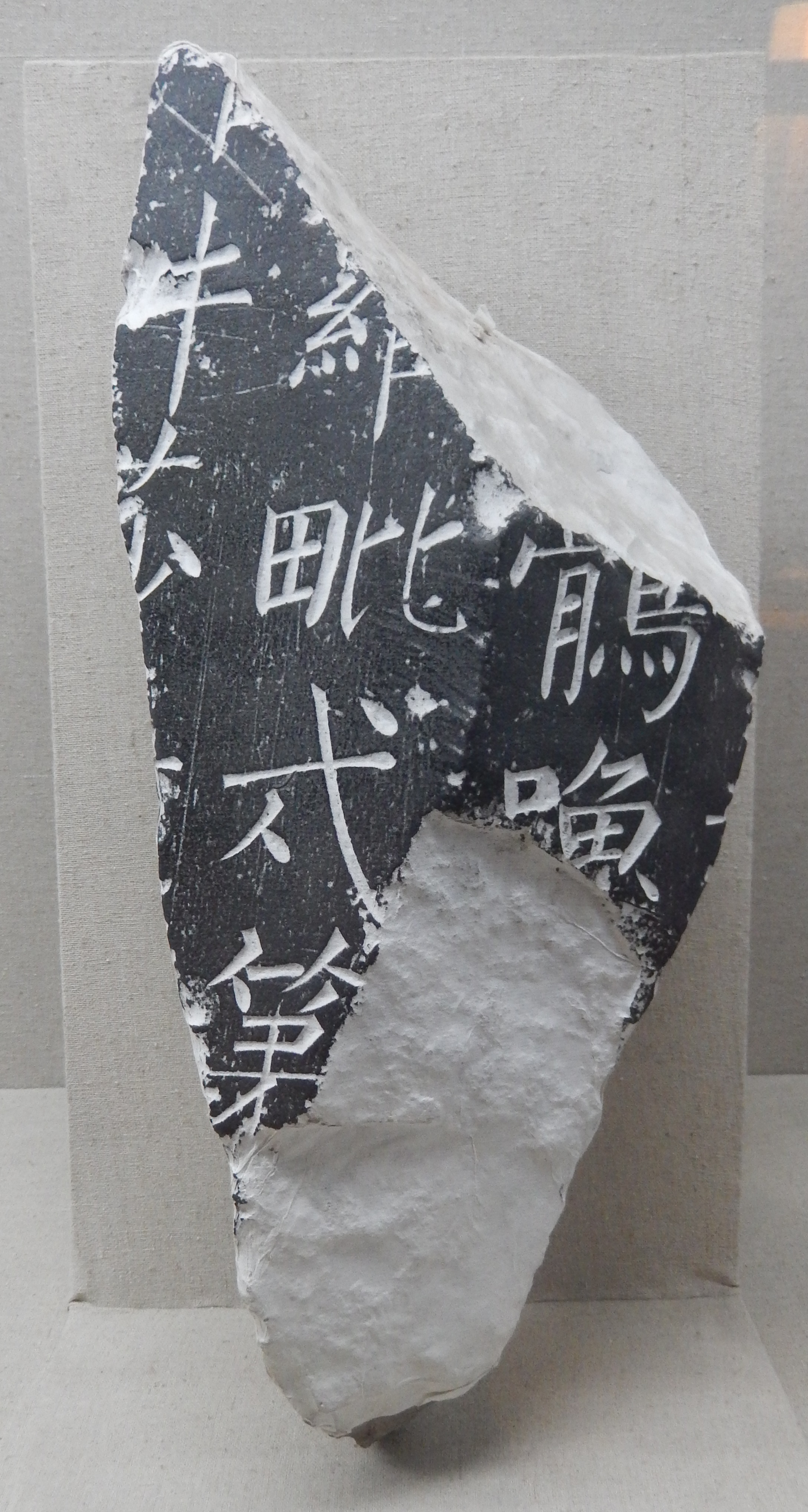
A fragment from a Liao dynasty dharani pillar of the Viśuddhaprabhā Dhāraṇī

=== History ===
The Viśuddhaprabhā Dhāraṇī is part of the Dhāraṇī genre, an important class of Buddhist text in India and beyond. A core theme in these works is the idea that a dhāraṇī contains the accumulated blessings of the buddhas. Consequently, constructing a stūpa and enshrining within it a promoted dhāraṇī is said to generate merit equivalent to building stūpas for a buddha relic. Etymologically linked to the Sanskrit root √dhṛ and the word dhāraṇa, the term conveys meanings of holding, retaining, and memory. One of its primary functions is to assist in memorizing Buddhist teaching. Beyond this mnemonic role, dhāraṇīs also serve protective and soteriological aims, since they were seen as promoting the ability to remember the Dharma and to contain special powers.

The Viśuddhaprabhā Dhāraṇī's transmission from India to East Asia illustrates the dynamics of medieval Buddhist exchange. The dhāraṇī initially arrived in the Kingdom of Khotan from India, where it was copied at Gomatī Monastery, which was a stronghold of the Buddhism in Central Asia. The Khotanese title of the dhāraṇī is Nirmala-vibhāsa-koṭi-pariśuddha Sarvatathāgata-samast-āśā-pratiṣṭhita-mudrā, which Lokesh Chandra translates to "Meditation for consummating all one’s wishes by the supremely pure immaculate radiance of the Omnipotent Tathāgata", translating mudrā-dhāraṇī as "dhāraṇī for meditation." Furthermore, according to Chandra, Nirmala-vibhāsa-koṭi-pariśuddha refers to Amitābha Buddha, the Buddha of Infinite Light.

The dhāraṇī sutra was translated into Chinese in 704 CE by the monk Mituoshan (possibly *Mitraśānta, or *Mitrasena) and the prominent Huayan master Fazang during the final year of Empress Wu Zetian's reign. Chandra writes that Mituoshan simplified the title in Chinese to 無垢淨光大陀羅尼經: Wu-kou (vimala) ching (viśuddha) kuang (prabhā) ta t‘o-lo-ni (mahā-dhāraṇī) ching (sūtra).

Mitrasena presented it at the court of Empress Wu Zetian (r. 690 to 705) of the Tang Dynasty. The Empress, seriously ill and seeking both healing and a favorable rebirth, became a key patron of the text, and many copies were made and ritually enshrined during her reign. Research suggests the sūtra may have been disseminated throughout East Asia as part of a relics-distribution campaign intended to serve as a propaganda tool for Empress Wu's dynasty. After Wu Zetian's death, her son Emperor Zhongzong disseminated printed copies of the dhāraṇī widely around China and in neighboring states in an effort to purify her karma and provide her with a good rebirth as well as pacify the nation. The text was also inscribed on dhāraṇī pillars. The text spread throughout East Asia quickly, reaching Korea in a few years, where it was used for similar ritual purposes. The most famous Korean example of the text is the Great Dhāraṇī Sūtra of Bulguksa (see below).

The dhāraṇī saw another major wave of promotion in 8th-century Japan under Empress Kōken (r. 749–758; 764–770). Following a period of political struggle and depression, she commissioned the production of one million miniature wooden pagodas (Hyakumantō), each containing a printed scroll of the dhāraṇī, in a monumental act of merit-making that sought to secure her health, political authority, and karmic destiny. These events cemented the text's reputation as an especially potent rite for those facing illness, old age, or political peril. Empress Kōken's Hyakumantō Darani project in the 760s-770s represents one of the world's earliest large-scale printing endeavors, predating the Diamond Sūtra. Thousands of these printed dhāraṇī slips survive in Japanese temple collections like Hōryū-ji, providing crucial evidence for early printing technology. The text also inspired artistic and architectural programs, with its descriptions of multi-tiered, multi-cakra pillars influencing stūpa design in East Asia. It remains studied as a prime example of how Buddhist ritual practices were mobilized for personal, political, and communal ends in medieval Asia.

A second and longer version of the dhāraṇī sutra was translated translated by Shihu (Skt. Dānapāla?) between 982 and 1017.

The text was also translated into Tibetan and is contained in the Tibetan Kangyur under the Kriyātantra section with the title 'Od zer dri ma med pa rnam par dag pa'i gzungs (Toh 510 / 982). It is still used as a ritual text in Tibetan Buddhism, mainly for the construction and consecration of stupas.

=== The texts ===
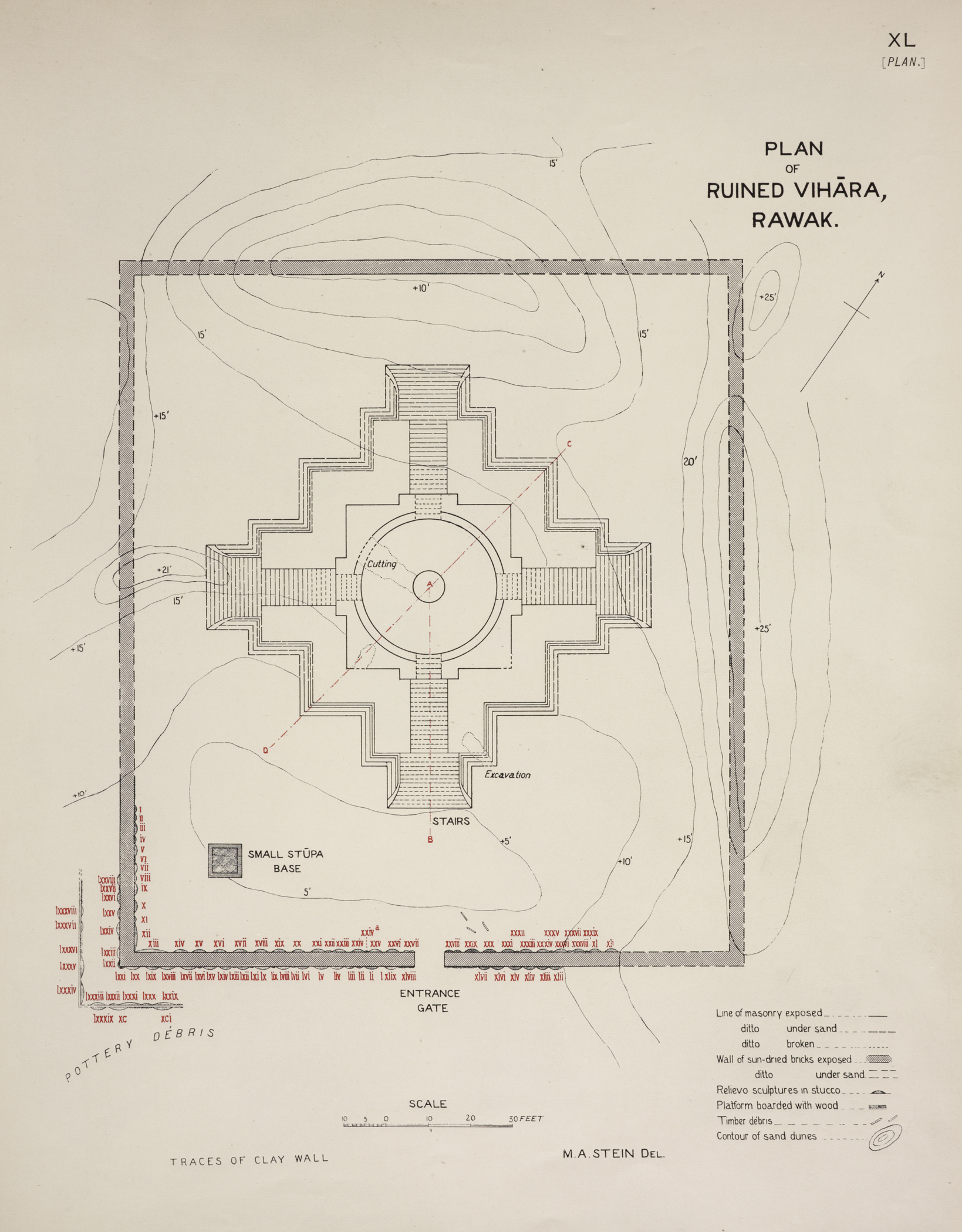
Aurel Stein's plan for the Khotanese Rawak Stupa. The Viśuddhaprabhā dhāraṇīs would have been used for the construction and consecration of similar stupas in Central Asia before being transmitted to China.

The Viśuddhaprabhā dhāraṇīs are found in several versions. The Sūtra of the Great Dhāraṇī of Pure Stainless Light Rays (Ch: 無垢淨光大陀羅尼經) is text number 1024 in the Taisho Tripitaka. This sutra was translated into Chinese by the Indian monk Mitrasena in 704 CE. Set in Kapilavastu, the narrative begins with a Brahmin named Jiebiluozhancha 劫比羅戰茶 (*Kapilacanda?), who is prophesied to die in seven days and descend into the Avīci Hell. Seeking refuge in the Buddha, he is instructed to repair an ancient, ruined stupa, deposit specific sacred formulas in it and chant dhāraṇī. This framework establishes the sutra's primary concern with death, pure land rebirth, karmic purification, illness and life extension, which is tied to ritual incantations and the worship of stupas. In particular, rebirth in the Pure Land of Sukhavati is mentioned four times in the sutra.

Ritually, the Viśuddhaprabhā Dhāraṇī is structured as a complete system for the construction, consecration, and use of a stūpa or ritual pillar (yaṣṭi/dhvaja). The canonical Chinese version of the Dhāraṇī Sūtra contains seven distinct dhāraṇīs, each with a specific liturgical function: (1) a root mantra for purification and life-extension; (2) a formula for sanctifying the central pillar (yaṣṭi) which absent in the Tibetan versions; (3) a dhāraṇī for repairing a damaged pillar; (4) for the sanctification of the pillar linked to the bodhisattva Sarvanīvaraṇaviṣkambhin; (5) an invocation for worship at the consecrated site; (6) a concluding rite (visarjana) of farewell to the invoked goddess; and (7) a reiterated great dhāraṇī. Dhāraṇī 7 is a "mahādhāraṇī" which is very similar to the first dhāraṇī with a few minor variations. The Tibetan version of the sutra has six dhāraṇīs (the text calls them mantras, Tib. sṅags).

According to Chandra, the number seven is symbolic, seven being associated with the sun deity in Indian thought, who is called Saptāśva ‘having seven horses’ in the Rigveda, and Saptasapti in the Mahābhārata. In the Brahmanas, the sun is "that which shines, protects everything" (Skt. ya eṣa tapaty eṣa hīdaṃ sarvaṃ gopāyati), it is "the soul of all the gods" (devānām ātmā), the sun "is life" (prāṇa-ādityaḥ), and "saves us from evil" (pāpmano ’pahantā). In a Buddhist context, the solar imagery signifies the light of Amitabha Buddha and its salvific power. Furthermore, Chandra adds that "the seventh dhāraṇī in the Chinese sutra begins with a salutation to sapta-saptati ‘seventy-seven’ in the Siddham script....Sapta-saptati seems to be an error for Saptasapti which means Sun in the Mahābhārata and kāvyas." Thus, the dhāraṇī may have originally referred to Amitabha by an epithet of the Indian sun god.

The root dhāraṇī (or mūla-mantra), which is the first one presented in the sutra, is the following:

namo saptasaptatibhyaḥ ǀ samyak-sambuddha-koṭīnām ǀ pariśuddha-mānasa-vāk-citta-pratiṣṭhitānām ǀ

namo bhagavate amitāyuṣasya tathāgatasya ǀ

oṁ tathāgata-śuddhe āyur-viśodhani saṁhara-saṁhara ǀ

Sarvatathāgata-vīrya-balena pratisaṁhara āyu ǀ smara-smara Sarvatathāgata-samayaṁ ǀ

bodhi-bodhi budhya vibudhya bodhaya-bodhaya ǀ

sarva-pāpa-āvaraṇa-viśuddhe vigata-mara-bhayaṁ subuddha-buddhe ǀ hulu hulu svāhā ǀ

Translation: Salutation to the Seventy-seven of the Supreme (koṭi) Perfectly Enlightened Ones, worshipped with purity of the mind, speech, and conscience. Salutation to Lord Amitāyuṣa Tathāgata. Om. You purified by the Tathāgata, purify my life, sustain [me]. Sustain [my] life by virtue of the powers of the Omnipotent Tathāgata (i.e., Amitāyuṣa). Think of the vow of the Omnipotent Tathāgata. You the Enlightenment, being enlightened, enlighten me. You are purified of all sins and ailments, make me devoid of the dread of death and supremely enlightened. Hasten, hasten, svāhā.

According to the sutra, those who hear the first dhāraṇī will eliminate the evil karma from the five evil acts as well as "flaws caused by jealously, arrogance, greed, envy, and so forth," and their lifespan will also be extended. Birth in the Pure Land of Amitabha is also a key benefit. The sutra also attributes apotropaic and protective powers to the physical presence of the dhāraṇī. The Buddha explains that kingdoms which contains stupas with copies of these dhāraṇī will be shielded from evil creatures (like raksasa, yaksas, etc.) invaders, thieves, disease, and disasters. These kingdoms will be protected by the four heavenly kings and other Buddhist deities. This dhāraṇī can also protect the nation from all sorts of troubles. Regarding the second dhāraṇī, the sutra states that it can help the sick and the dying, and it describes a ritual used for this purpose. The deity Vinayaka is associated with this ritual. The third dhāraṇī, called the “wheeled canopy or finial dhāraṇī ” (Ch. xianglun tuoluoni, Kor. sangnyuntarani 相輪陀羅尼), can purify the kleshas, extend lifespan and lead to rebirth in Sukhavati. The fourth dhāraṇī helps with purification and spiritual development, and the sutra promotes the extensive mental chanting of the fourth dhāraṇī.

A central motif found in all dhāraṇīs is that they all invoke the feminine deity Viśuddhaprabhā ("Pure Radiance"), who is asked to purify afflictions and obstacles. All seven texts invoke this deity with a feminine vocative like "āyur-viśodhani" in the above text. The motif of light rays (raśmi-prabhā) evokes the sun-like rays of Buddha Amida's body, here personified as a feminine deity. Chandra writes that "Viśuddha-prabhā ‘Pure Radiance’ is a deification of the raśmi which have been invoked since the Vedic period: Raśmi-pavitra ‘purified with rays’ occurs in the Taittirīya-brāhmaṇa. She is invoked in the first five dhāraṇīs in the vocative case. She is immaculately pure, redeems all sins, and commutes all physical ailments and mental afflictions." Furthermore, according to Chandra, "she is the epiphany of the Omnipotent Tathāgata Amitāyuṣa. The worshipper invokes Her in the imperative mood, e.g., sara-sara ‘hasten, hasten’ to bless me. At times the vocative stands for the imperative, e.g., āyur-pālani (short ˚i for vocative) means ‘grant me along life’, adhiṣṭhite ‘You the blessed one’ stands for ‘please bless me’."

In its conclusion, the Buddha entrusts the dhāraṇī to a host of celestial guardians, including Vajrapāṇi and the Four Heavenly Kings, commanding them to "protect and hold it, carrying it in a jewel casket upon your shoulders." This underscores the high value placed on the physical text as a "treasury of the sublime Dharma."

=== Ritual application ===
The rituals discussed in the sutra involves inscribing or printing the dhāraṇīs, placing them in the stūpa's hollow base or pillar, which transforms the monument into a field of merit. Then the main practice of circumambulating the stūpa while chanting the main dhāraṇī for seventy seven times is taught. This practice should be accomplished on the eighth, thirteenth, fourteenth, and fifteenth days of the month, following the Indian lunar calendar. The sutra also mentions the making of an altar where the dhāraṇī is to be copied seventy seven times. These copies should then be enshrined in the stupa after a puja done with incense, flowers and food. It also teaches the production of seventy seven small clay stupas where copies of the dhāraṇī should be enshrined. The text also promises that "if one writes seventy-seven copies of this mantra and places them in seventy-seven small clay stupas," the practitioner can avert imminent death and secure rebirth in the Pure Land of Sukhāvatī. Various rituals associated with the different dhāraṇīs are further described throughout the sutra. The text also declares that "where this mantra exists, the Tathāgata is present," effectively equating the written formula with the living presence of the Buddha. This belief transformed the landscape of medieval East Asia, as stupas were erected as spiritual fortifications for both the state and the common people.

According to Richard D. McBride II, the widespread use of the Viśuddhaprabhā Dhāraṇī should not be interpreted as evidence of Mantrayana or Esoteric Buddhism. McBride has critiqued the problematic tendency in Buddhist studies to classify any text containing dhāraṇīs as inherently “esoteric.” McBride sees this as an anachronistic view that does not reflect the historical reality of medieval Sinitic Buddhism. He asserts that there is little evidence for self-identified, distinct Esoteric Buddhism in Silla Korea or in the sutra itself, and that practices involving dhāraṇīs were a mainstream component of Mahāyāna Buddhism rather than a separate esoteric tradition.

McBride notes that the sutra text prescribes rituals for practical and worldly benefits, such as eradicating bad karma, prolonging life, curing illness, ensuring rebirth in a heaven or the Pure Land, and protecting the state. While these rituals involve constructing altars and making offerings, they lack the defining features of Mantrayana, such as the ritual recreation of the Buddha's body, speech, and mind (the three mysteries), secret initiations (abhiṣeka), maṇḍalas, or meditation under a guru's guidance. McBride argues that the Silla elite's adoption of this dhāraṇī was used for public, merit-making rituals tied to stūpa construction, not for esoteric cultivation. Copies of the scripture were enshrined in stūpas dedicated to royal ancestors, and its instructions for building numerous small stūpas were meticulously followed, as seen in discoveries at sites like Hwangnyong Monastery. This widespread, public use contrasts sharply with the secretive, initiatory character of Tantrism. Thus, the Sūtra of the Great Dhāraṇī of Pure Stainless Light Rays represents what McBride terms “practical Buddhist thaumaturgy”, a kind of Buddhist magic aimed at solving religious concerns.

== The Korean Great Dhāraṇī Sūtra ==
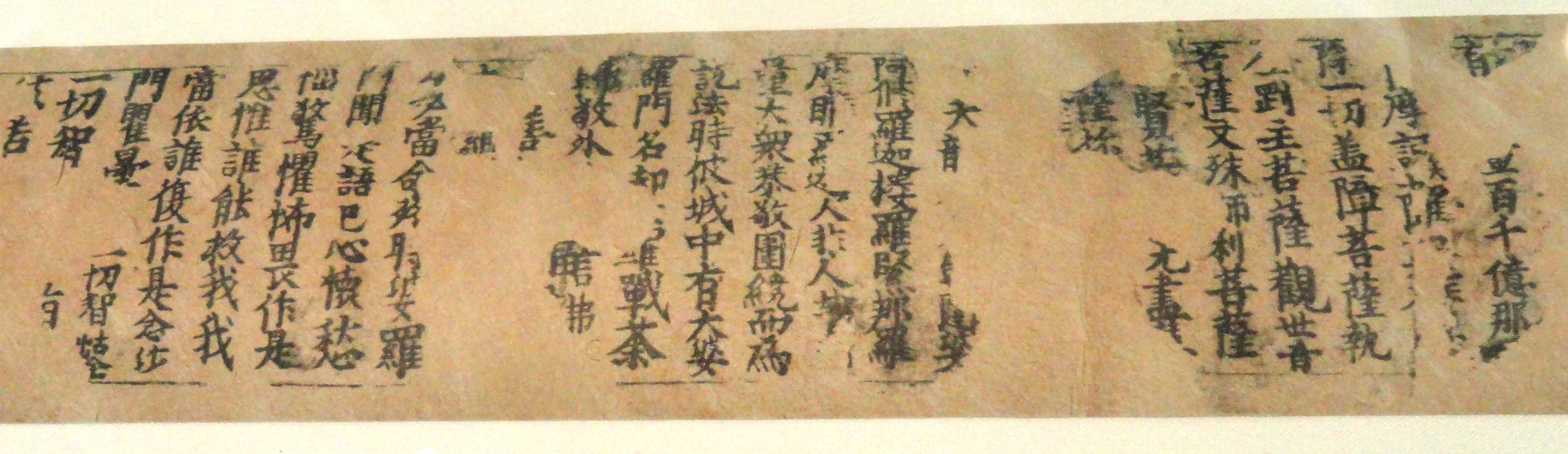
Great Dharani Sutra of Immaculate Pure Light, 8th century woodblock print, Korean Culture Museum, Incheon Airport, Seoul, South Korea.

Archaeological findings suggest that Korean elites in the Silla kingdom followed ritual procedures similar to those described in the Mahayana dhāraṇī sūtras like the Viśuddhaprabhā. These practices were likely adopted from China. Silla rulers constructed impressive wooden and stone stupas during the sixth through eighth centuries, including notable structures at major monasteries in their capital. During the eighth century, Silla monarchs used the Viśuddhaprabhā Dhāraṇī Sūtra as a means of demonstrating filial devotion to their deceased relatives while accumulating merit. One significant example involves King Sŏngdŏk, who in 706 placed buddha relics, a gold statue, and the dhāraṇī text within a three-story stupa at Hwangbok Monastery to honor his grandparents and father. The royal family's quick adoption of this newly translated scripture suggests close connections with the Chinese translation bureau and indicates the text's special importance to them.

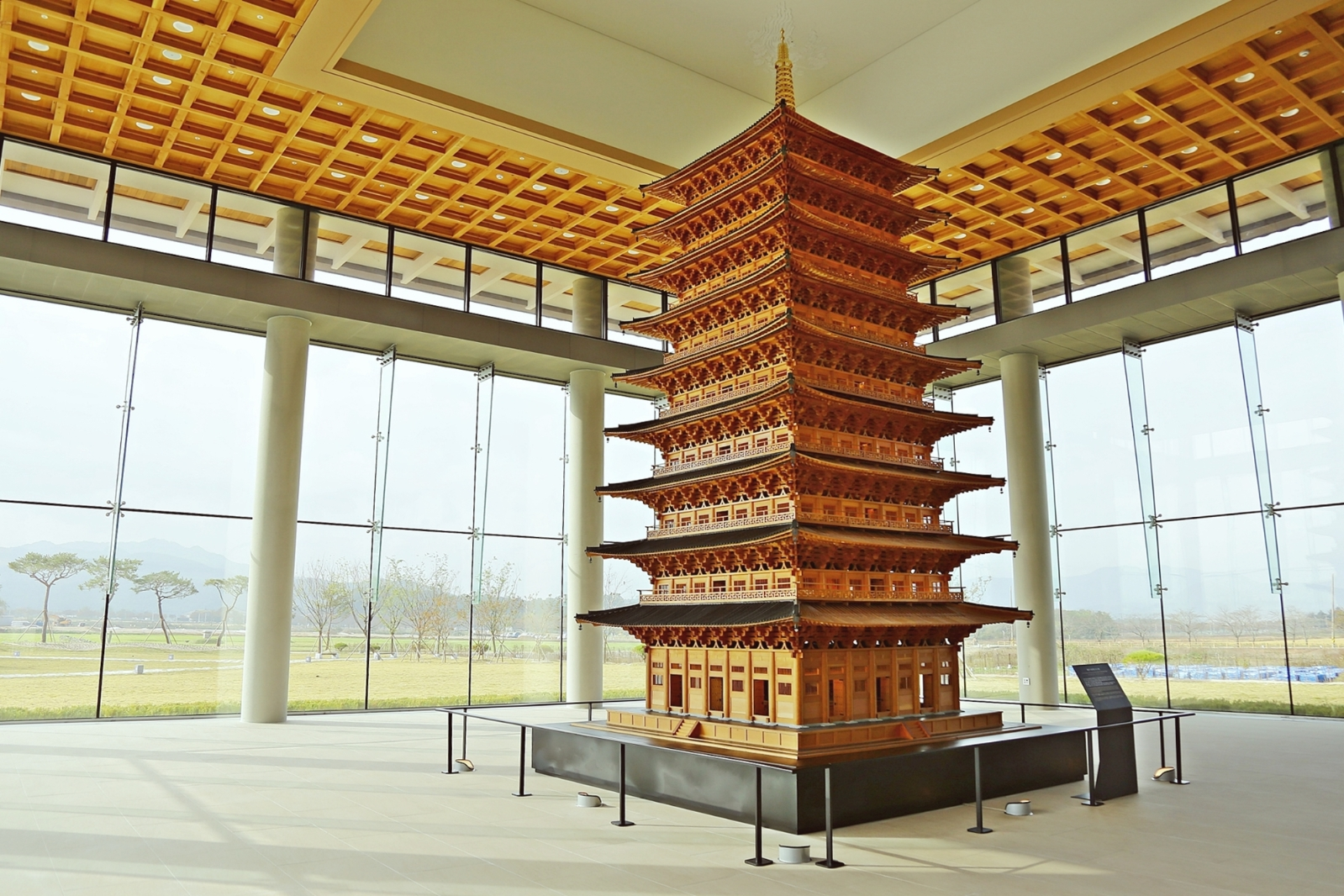
A scale model of Hwangnyongsa pagoda

Throughout the Silla period and beyond, the Viśuddhaprabhā Dhāraṇī remained central to Korean Buddhist ritual practice, as evidenced by numerous inscriptions and archaeological discoveries of stupas containing the text. Multiple sites across Korea featured stupas named after the scripture, containing either the text itself or groups of ninety-nine or seventy-seven miniature stupas as prescribed in the dhāraṇī's instructions. Notable examples include the 872 renovation of the nine-story pagoda at Hwangnyong Monastery and various other monastic sites through the late ninth century. The scripture's continued importance extended well into subsequent dynasties, demonstrating its enduring role in Korean Buddhist tradition long after interest in the text diminished in China and Japan.

A woodblock printed copy of the Viśuddhaprabhā Dhāraṇī Sūtra, known as the Great Dhāraṇī Sūtra (K: Mugujŏnggwang Taedaranigyŏng, 무구정광대다라니경, Ch: 無垢淨光大陀羅尼經) was discovered on October 13, 1966, during repairs of Seokgatap (the three-storied pagoda) in Bulguksa which is located in South Korea. Joseph Needham assumed it was made between 684 and 704, but since the Viśuddhaprabhā Dhāraṇī Sūtra was translated into Chinese from Sanskrit in 704, and Bulguksa was built in 751, it is assumed that it was built between the two periods, and is considered to be one of the oldest woodblock prints (on hanji) in the world.

This Great Dhāraṇī scroll demonstrates sophisticated printing techniques, and the presence of special characters created by Empress Wu has fueled discussions about whether it was produced in Korea or China. The text contains Chinese characters of Empress Wu which were used only when the Tang dynasty of China was ruling, so it is acknowledged to have been printed before Seokgatap was repaired. However, The Great Dhāraṇī Sūtra contains the character 照, which is part of Empress Wu's name, indicating that it was produced in a location far from Tang dynasty. It is currently designated as National Treasure No. 126-6.

In 1966, a bundle of paper known as the "ink sheet (墨書紙片)" was found. This document was preserved in 1988–89, and in 1997–98 it was separated into 110 pages. It was interpreted in 2005 and 2007, and caused a controversy over the production age of the Great Dhāraṇī Sūtra.

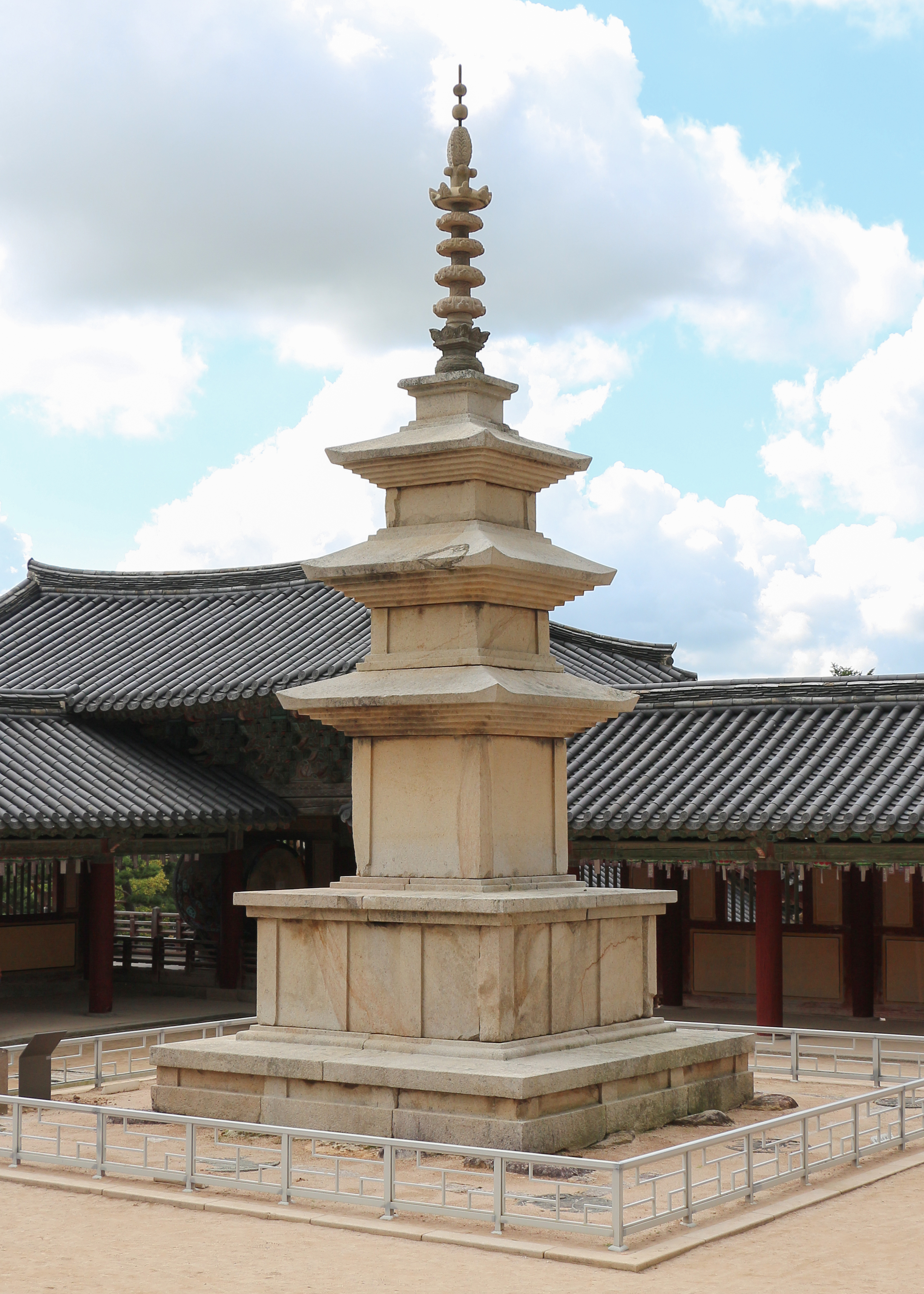
Seokgatap Pagoda, a Silla-era stone pagoda at Bulguksa temple, Gyeongju, South Korea

The Seokgatap pagoda, where the text was found, is an East Asian stupa, traditionally built as a sacred tower which is filled with sari relics, which sanctify the structure. The relics are divided into the sinsari (the relics of the Buddha) and the bubsari (the scripture relics). The scripture which was largely prevalent in the Unified Silla period is the "Mugujeonggwang Daedaranigyeong (無垢淨光大陀羅尼經)" translated from Chinese in 704. This scripture states that when building or repairing a tower, it is necessary to use 99 or 77 bundles of darani to put it in a small mud-tower and seal it in, which extends the life span and extinguishes all sins. In 706, the royal family of Silla implemented the contents of this scripture in the memorial service for the king of the fleet, and in the sari locker to enter into the tower of Hwangbok for the temporal king. In other words, it depicts 99 small towers on the surface of the sari enclosure to bless the sari. After the 9th century, the expression of these small towers was established as a sari locker method that encircles 99 or 77 small towers containing Darani and spreads to the whole area of Unified Silla.

=== Structure ===
The Great Dhāraṇī Sūtra consists of 12 sheets of paper, totalling 620 cm in length and 8 cm in height. Each line contains around 8 characters. The first sheet has 56 rows and its size is 56.8 cm. The second sheet has 55 rows and its size is 53.8 cm. The third sheet has 55 rows and its size is 53.2 cm. The fourth sheet has 57 rows and its size is 52.9 cm. The fifth sheet has 56 rows and its size is 54.5 cm. The sixth sheet has 62 rows and its size is 55.1 cm. The seventh sheet has 61 rows and its size is 54.3 cm. The eighth sheet has 59 rows and its size is 55.6 cm. The ninth sheet has 60 rows and its size is 55 cm. The tenth sheet has 63 rows and its size is 54.2 cm. The eleventh sheet has 61 rows and its size is 53.9 cm. The twelfth sheet has 38 rows and its size is 43.9 cm.

A microscopic examination revealed that the papers of The Great Dharani Sutra were made as hanji, which is the traditional Korean paper handmade from mulberry trees.

=== Controversy ===
As the book is considered the oldest surviving woodblock print in the world, it is the source of claims by some Korean scholars that printing was invented in Korea. This has been criticized by Chinese and Japanese historians while other Korean scholars have advised caution towards the claims. Archaeological discoveries since 1966 have pushed the existence of extant woodblock prints earlier in China, including a printed Sanskrit dharani charm in Xi'an dated to the mid-7th century and a printed Lotus Sutra dated between 690 and 699 in Turpan. The Lotus Sutra in Turpan contains the same set of Chinese characters specific to the reign of Wu Zetian as the Great Dharani Sutra in Korea. Historian Pan Jixing notes that some Korean scholars have ignored these discoveries. However, The Great Dharani Sutra contains the character 照, which is part of Empress Wu's name, indicating that it was produced in a location far from Tang dynasty.

== The Hyakumantō Darani Pagodas ==
Hyakumantō Darani (百万塔陀羅尼)
- One Million Pagodas and Dharani Prayers
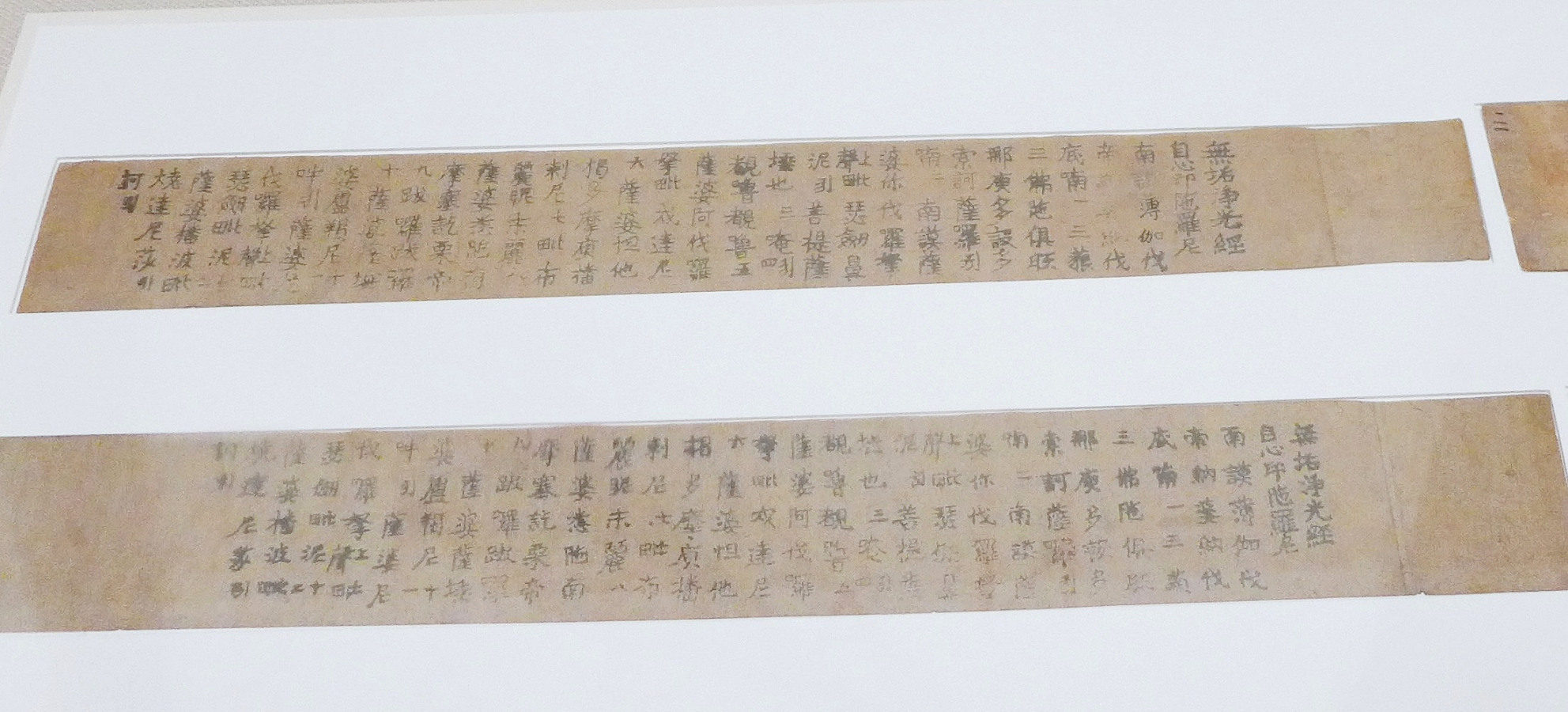

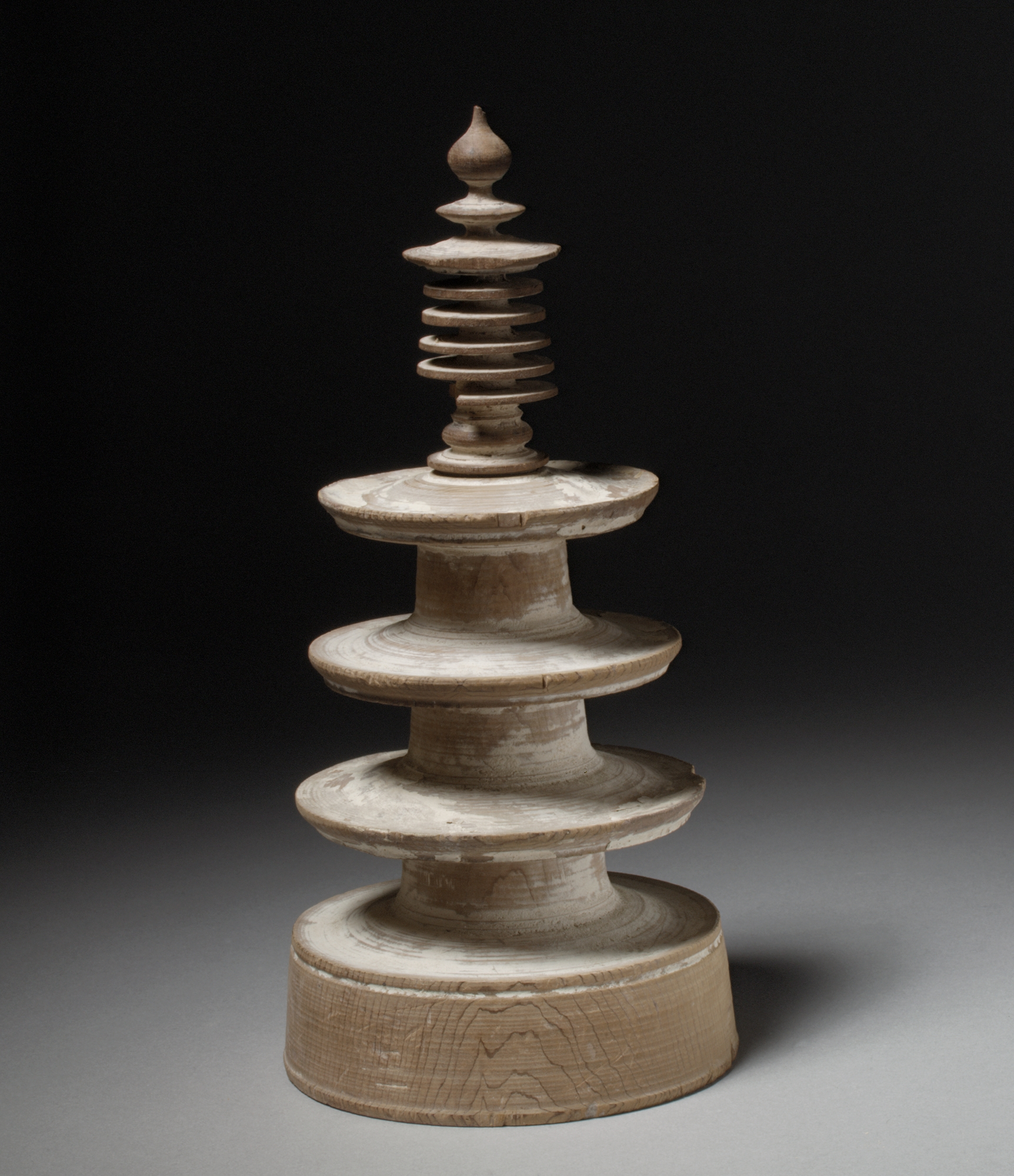
- Material: Washi (paper), ink, wood
- Writing: Japanese
- Created: 764-770 C.E.
- Present location: various

The Japanese Hyakumantō Darani (百万塔陀羅尼), or the "One Million Pagodas and Dharani Prayers", are a series of Viśuddhaprabhā Dhāraṇīs that were printed on paper and then rolled up and housed in miniature pagodas. Although woodblock-printed books from Chinese Buddhist temples were seen in Japan as early as the 8th century, the Hyakumantō Darani are the earliest surviving examples of printing in Japan and, alongside the Korean Great Dhāraṇī Sūtra, are considered to be some of the world's oldest existent printed matter.

There are various theories around Shōtoku's motives for commissioning the Hyakumantō Darani. One is that of remorse and thanksgiving for the suppression of the Emi Rebellion of 764, and another is as an assertion of power and control over resources, but the act could equally serve both political and devotional aims. Either it was felt that printing as a technology had served its ritual purpose through the creation of the Hyakumantō Darani, or simply that the cost of this mass production proved prohibitive, but printing technology did not become widespread until the tenth century and the production, and distribution of books continued to rely heavily on hand-copying manuscripts.

=== Manufacture ===
The production of the Hyakumantō Darani was a huge undertaking. In the year of her resumption of the throne, 764, the Empress Shōtoku commissioned the one million small wooden pagodas (Hyakumantō (百万塔), each containing a small piece of paper (typically 6 x 45 cm) printed with the Vimalaśuddhaprabhāsa-mahādhāraṇī-sūtra, J: Mukujōkō daidarani kyō (無垢淨光大陀羅尼經). It is thought they were printed in Nara, where the facilities, craftsmen and skills existed to undertake such large scale production. Marks on the bases of the wooden pagodas indicate that they were worked on lathes and studies of these have identified that more than 100 different lathes were used in their production.

More than 45,000 pagodas and 3,962 printed dharani survive in the Hōryū-ji temple near Nara, but globally fewer than 50,000 pagodas are known to still exist. Their creation was completed around 770, and they were distributed to temples around the country.
