= Shadowless Pagoda (film) =

1957 South Korean film

- Theatrical release poster
- Hangul: 무영탑
- Hanja: 無影塔
- RR: Muyeongtap
- MR: Muyŏngt'ap
- Directed by: Shin Sang-ok (신상옥)
- Written by: Hyun Jin-geon
- Screenplay by: Lee Hyeong-pyo
- Starring: Choi Eun-hee (최은희) Han Eun-jin (한은진) Kwak Geon (곽건)
- Music by: Na Un-yeong
- Release date: January 31, 1957
- Running time: 1h 58m
- Country: South Korea
- Language: Korean

Shadowless Pagoda (Korean: 무영탑; RR: Muyeongtap) is a 1957 South Korean film starring Choi Eun-hee (최은희) as Guseul Agi (구슬아기), a free-spirited woman, and Kwak Geon (곽건) as Asadal (아사달), the stonemason credited with creating the Dabotap and Seokgatap pagodas at Bulguksa temple. The film was adapted from a 1937 novel by Hyun Jin-geon.

== Plot ==
Guseul Agi, portrayed by Choi Eun-hee, is the daughter of Minister Yujong. She accompanies King Gyeongdeok on his tour of the Bulguksa construction site, where the completed Dabotap pagoda is widely praised. At first sight, she falls in love with Asadal—the stonemason played by Kwak Geon—whom she actively pursues. Eventually, she saves him from burnout, and as she cares for him, their relationship evolves. In contrast to the conventional melodramatic trope—that a man who assists a woman in distress will inevitably fall in love—the film reverses traditional gender roles.

The narrative intertwines several storylines, punctuated by numerous rides under the moonlight. The political conflict between the pro-Tang faction (당학파; 唐學派) and the Hwarangdo faction (국선도파; 國仙道派) culminates in a slander orchestrated by Geum Seong of the Tang faction, who harbored a crush on Guseul Agi and was in an arranged marriage with Gyeong-sin of the Hwarangdo faction.

Meanwhile, Asanyeo, Asadal's wife (portrayed by Han Eun-jin), rushes to Seorabeol after waiting three years for her husband. However, she is unable to enter the temple and must wait near the Reflecting Pond, where the shadow of the Dabotap pagoda is already visible. Due to the misdeeds of Kongkong, the intermediary, Asanyeo begins to doubt Asadal. Not witnessing the completion of the tower, she plunges into the Shadow Pool and dies without ever seeing her husband's face. Meanwhile, Guseul Agi is apprehended and burned at the stake when her father discovers that she has eloped with a commoner (실행(失行)). Despite Gyeong-sin's intervention, she dies.

In the final scene set at the pond, Asadal sees visions of Guseul Agi and Asanyeo. The two illusions merge into one, forming the shape of the holy Buddha. Consequently, Asadal carves a sculpture of the Buddha (화형(火刑)) that unites the images of the two women with the elements of water and fire, before ultimately drowning himself in the Shadow Pond.

== Background ==
=== Bulguksa Temple ===
Bulguksa which means "Temple of the Buddha Land," is the principal Buddhist temple in Korea. It originated with a small temple built in 528 under King Beopheung of Silla. The present temple was constructed under King Gyeongdeok, beginning in 751 and completed in 774. During the Silla Kingdom, the modern city of Gyeongju served as the capital (Seorabeol), and the Bulguksa site was chosen for its proximity to Anapji (14 km), the central palace.

The temple complex features two pagodas that illustrate different aspects of the Lotus Sutra. The Seokgatap (muyongtap, "the pagoda without a shadow") stands at 8.2 meters and is a traditional three-story Korean-style stone pagoda characterized by simple lines and minimal detailing. In contrast, the Dabotap (yongtap, "the pagoda with a shadow") stands at 10.4 meters and is renowned for its highly ornate structure, which gives it a more feminine appearance.

The Dabotap, situated on the right, is associated with the Many Treasures Buddha (Dabo = Prabhutaratna, "the Buddha from the past") and symbolizes yang and objective truth, representing the complexity of the world. Conversely, the Seokgatap, located on the left, is associated with Sakyamuni ("the Buddha from the present") and symbolizes yin and the subjective wisdom required to realize the truth, representing the brevity of spiritual ascent.

=== Shadowless Pagoda (1937 Novel) ===
"Muyeongtap" is a novel written by Hyun Jin-geon (현진건; 玄鎭健), based on legends he recorded during his visit to Gyeongju. The legend recounts the story of a master stonemason who built the Seokgatap pagoda. His wife, who came to visit him, was not permitted to see her husband due to the ongoing construction of the pagoda. The gatekeeper of Bulguksa Temple instructed her to wait near the reflecting pond, where the shadow of the Dabotap had already appeared. After watching the pond for two years without glimpsing the shadow of the Seokgatap, she ceased waiting and threw herself into the pond. Upon completing the pagoda, the stonemason searched for his wife in the pond without success; consequently, he carved a Buddha statue resembling his wife and then entered the pond.

Based on this legend, Hyun Jin-geon completed a full-length novel that was published serially in the Dong-A Ilbo beginning in July 1938. In the process, two alterations were made. First, the stonemason's place of origin was changed from the Tang Dynasty to Buyeo, Baekje. Second, the stonemason's love story was expanded by introducing the daughter of a Silla nobleman as the love interest of the mason Asadal.

Mun Haksan writes that, considering the dating customs prevalent in the late 1930s, Guseul Agi's proactiveness was closely linked to the image of a "new woman" who practiced free love.

== Cast ==
=== Main ===
The film credits list the following three characters:

- Choi Eun-hee (최은희; 催銀姬) as Guseul Agi (구슬아기)
- Gwak Geon (곽건; 郭楗) as Asadal (아사달)
- Han Eui-jin (한은진; 韓銀珍) as Asanyeo (아사녀)

=== People around Juman (Guseul Agi) ===
- Song Eok (송억; 宋億) as Yujong Ison (이손 유종), Guseul's father
- No Neung-geol (노능걸; 盧能杰) as Gyeong-sin (금경신)
- Kim Ok-gyeong (김옥경; 金玉鏡) as Teol, Guseul's daughter
- Ahn Cho-myeong (안초명; 安草明) as the mother (role unspecified)

=== People around Asanyeo ===
- Gang Gye-sik (강계식; 姜桂殖) as Buseok (부석), Asanyeo's father
- Kim Seung-ho (김승호; 金勝鎬) as Paeng Gae (팽개), the valet of Buyeo's family
- Baek Song (백송; 白柗) as Monk Ppalgaeng-i (승려)
- Park Sun-bong (박순봉) as a monk (승려)
- No Jae-sin (노재신; 盧載信) as Kongkong (콩콩), the old woman matchmaker

=== Others ===
- Kim Hak (김학; 金學) as King Gyeongdeok of Silla (왕)
- Jang Il-ho (장일호; 張一湖) as Geum Seong (금성)
- Yang Mi-hee (양미희; 양美姬) as Ahok (아옥), Geum Seong's sister (born 1931)
- Jang Hun (장훈; 張勳) as Geum Ji (금지), Geum Seong's father
- Lee Gi-hong (이기홍; 李起期) as Goduswe (고두쇠), Geum Seong's valet
- Park Seung-mun (박승문; 朴勝文) as Fresh Breeze (샛바람)

== See also ==
- List of South Korean films of 1957

== Sources ==
- DCKL 권영민 Kwon Young-min (2004-02-25). 무영탑 [Shadowless Pagoda (novel)]. Dictionary of Contemporary Korean Literature. 한국현대문학대사전.
- Doopedia 무영탑 [Muyeongtap (novel)]. Doosan Encyclopedia.
- EncyKor 영지 석불 좌상 (影池 石佛 坐像) [Seated Stone Buddha at Yeongji]. Encyclopedia of Korean National Culture.
- KMDB 무영탑(1957) [Shadowless Pagoda (1957)].
- KTV "무영탑" - 1957년 제작, 신상옥 감독 [Muyeong Tap" - Produced in 1957, directed by Shin Sang-ok]. 2016-10-16. ; 76회 in the "again series".
- Pratt, Keith L.; Rutt, Richard; Hoare, James (September 1999). Korea, A Historical and Cultural Dictionary. Routledge/Curzon. ISBN 978-0-7007-0464-4., 594 pages
- Mun Haksan (2020-09-16). 신상옥의 '무영탑'(1957) [Shin Sang-ok's 'Muyeongtap' (1957)]. Beopbo Newspaper (1553).
