= Seokgatap =

Stone pagoda in Gyeongju, South Korea

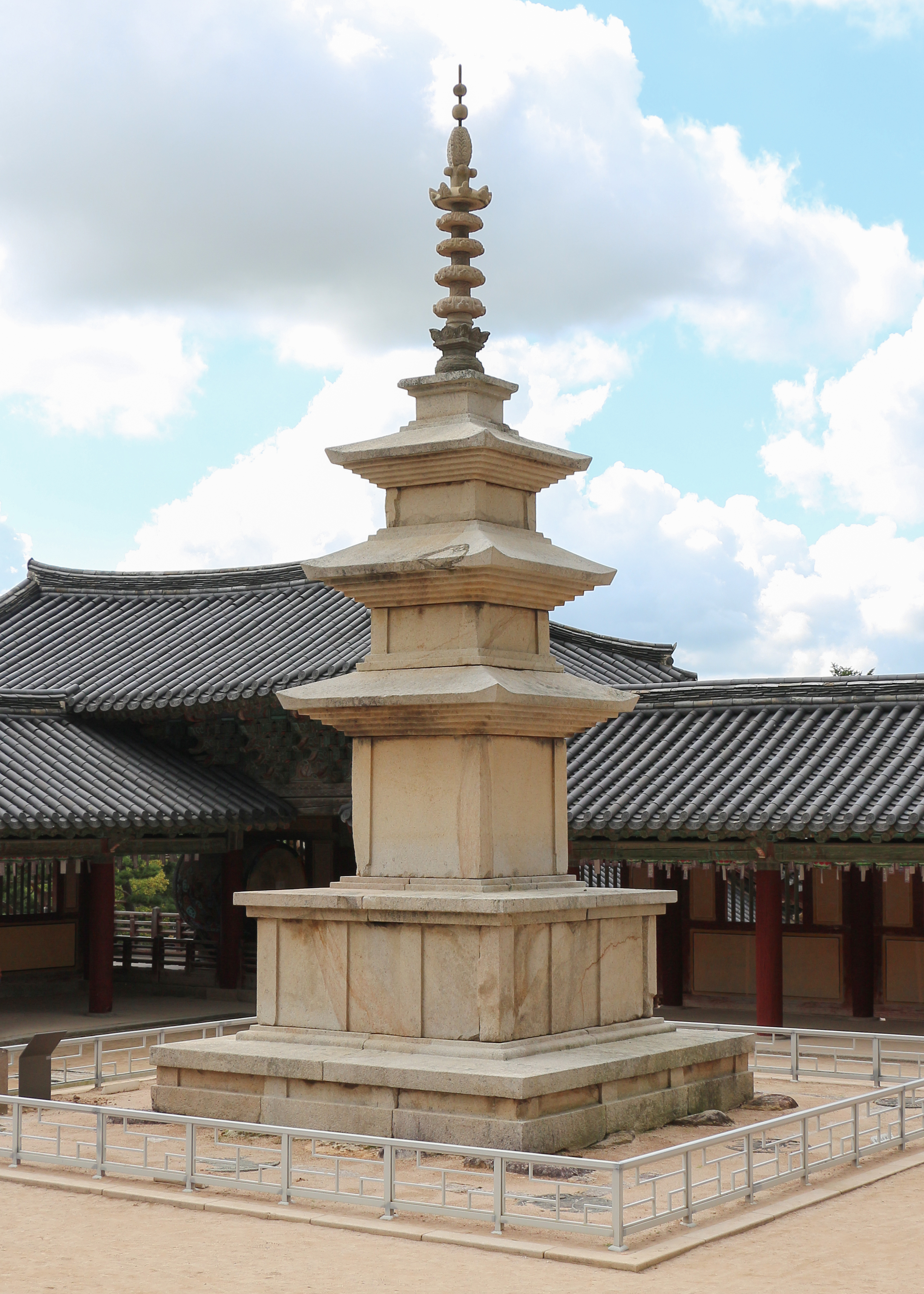
- The pagoda (2022)
- Designation

National Treasure (South Korea)
- Designated: 1962-12-20
- Reference no.: 21
- Location: Gyeongju; 35.7900°N 129.3320°E

Korean name
- Hangul: 석가탑
- Hanja: 釋迦塔
- RR: Seokgatap
- MR: Sŏkkat'ap

Seokgatap (Korean: 석가탑; Hanja: 釋迦塔) is a Silla-era stone pagoda in the temple Bulguksa in Gyeongju, South Korea. It was designated National Treasure of South Korea No. 21 on December 20, 1962. The pagoda stands 10.75 meters high and directly across from another pagoda Dabotap. It probably dates to around 751, when Bulguksa was completed.

== Description ==
The Seokgatap is in distinct contrast with its more elaborate brother the Dabotap. The pagoda is of a very simple and basic design and the three stories have a pleasing 4:3:2 ratio which gives the pagoda a sense of balance, stability, and symmetry. The contrast between the simplicity of the Seokgatap and the complexity of the Dabotap is designed to represent the dual nature of the Buddha's contemplation and detachment from the world or perhaps it symbolizes the celestial versus the terrestrial.

The pagoda's three stories rest on a two tiered base. The simplicity of the pagoda is reinforced by the fact that there are no carvings or reliefs on the faces of the pagoda. Although, the pagoda is surrounded by eight lotus flower stones. The top of the pagoda, which is rather elaborate, was added in 1973 to match a pagoda that was built one hundred years after Seokgatap.

== Discovery of treasures ==
In 1966, robbers attempted to force the pagoda open and steal its contents, but they were prevented from doing so. While repairing the pagoda, on October 13, 1966, the treasures were uncovered for the first time. They found reliquaries, sariras, and the oldest extant example of printed material from a wood block in the world (The Great Dharani Sutra).

=== National treasure No. 126 ===
A sarira is a reliquary that contains the remains of an esteemed monk or sometimes royalty. After the failed theft by robbers, workers refurbishing and repairing the pagoda found the treasures hidden inside. Notably, the Dabotap pagoda was dismantled by the Japanese for repairs during the 1920s but no record mentions any treasure recovered. Treasures included a bronze image of a Buddhist spirit, a bronze mirror, a miniature wooden pagoda, silk, perfume, gogok, and beads. A bundle of papers were found in the foundation of the pagoda but they are illegible.

The sarira box is shaped like a house, and has an engraved roof. Each of the walls of the case have an engraved vine pattern that runs up to the roof. Lotus motifs are used throughout as well and the top of the roof has a leaf-shaped ornamentation.

The oldest extant woodblock print is a copy of the Mugujeonggwang, the Great Dharani Sutra. The text is the oldest extant printed material in the world for several reasons. The pagoda itself was built in 751, the print had to have been made before that date and no other printed material dates before 750–751 CE. It is 620 centimeters in length and eight centimeters in width. The print contains six to nine characters per line. The print has deteriorated due to oxidation and restorations were carried out to preserve the print.

== See also ==
- National treasures of Korea
- Bulguksa Temple
- Shadowless Pagoda (film)
