= List of South Korean films of 1948–1959 =

This is a list of films produced in South Korea, from September 1948, the date of its creation, through 1959.

Title	Director	Cast	Genre	Notes
1948
Daedoshi	Lee jin	Kim Ung	Drama	
Night Before Independence (독립 전야)	Choi In-gyu			
The Prosecutor and the Woman Teacher	Yun Dae-ryong			
Yu Gwan-sun				
1949
Aegukjaui adeul				
Baekbeom gukminjang shilgi				
Breaking the Wall	Han Hyeong-mo			
Hometown of the Heart	Yoon Yong-gyu	Byun Ki-jong		
Mokdonggwa geumshigye				
Muneojin sampalseon				
Seongbyeokeul ddulgo				
A Woman's Diary	Hong Seong-ki			
1950
Woman's Love Story	Shin Kyeong-gyun			
1951
Righteous Advance	Han Hyeong-mo			
1952
Evil Night	Shin Sang-ok			
1953
The Final Temptation	Jeong Chang-hwa			
1954
Arirang	Lee Kang-cheon			
The Hand of Fate	Han Hyeong-mo	Yoon In-ja		
1955
Box of Death	Kim Ki-young	Choi Moo-ryong; Kang Hyo-shil		
Chunhyang-jeon	Choi Moo-ryong; Kang Hyo-shil			
Piagol	Lee Kang-cheon	Noh Kyung-hee		
Sad Story of an Executioner	Kim Seong-min			
Widow	Park Nam-ok			
Yangsan Province	Kim Ki-young	Kim Sam-hwa		
Youth	Shin Sang-ok			

== 1956–1959 ==
English/Korean Title	Director	Cast	Genre	Notes
1956
Hyperbola of Youth	Han Hyeong-mo	Hwang Hae		
Holiday in Seoul	Lee Yong-min			
Madame Freedom	Han Hyeong-mo	Kim Jeong-rim		
Touch-Me-Not	Kim Ki-young	Na Gang-hui; An Seok-jin		
The Wedding Day	Lee Byung-il	Jo Mi-ryeong		
1957
The Night of Truth	Kim Han-il			
The Pagoda With No Shadow	Shin Sang-ok			
The Palace of Ambition	Jeong Chang-hwa			
Pure Love	Han Hyeong-mo			
That Woman's Life	Kim Han-il			
Twilight Train	Kim Ki-young	Park Am; Do Kum-bong		
A Woman's War	Kim Ki-young	Jo Mi-ryeong; Park Am		
1958
Confession of a University Student	Shin Sang-ok			
A Country Girl	Park Young-hwan			
First Snow	Kim Ki-young	Kim Ji-mee; Kim Seung-ho		
A Flower in Hell	Shin Sang-ok	Choi Eun-hee		
Forever With You	Yu Hyun-mok			
Free Marriage	Lee Byung-il			
The Hill With a Zelkova Tree	Choi Hoon			
Money	Kim So-dong	Kim Seung-ho		
A Mother's Love	Yang Ju-nam			
1959
Defiance of a Teenager	Kim Ki-young	Hwang Hae-nam; Um Aing-ran		
Dongsimcho	Shin Sang-ok			
Even the Clouds Are Drifting	Yu Hyun-mok			Entered into the 10th Berlin International Film Festival
Female Executive	Han Hyeong-mo			
It's Not Her Sin	Shin Sang-ok			
Three Brides	Kim Soo-yong			
