= List of South Korean films of 1957 =

This is a list of films produced in South Korea in 1957.

Released	English title	Korean title	Director	Cast	Genre	Notes
1957
31 January	Hwang Jin-I	황진이	Jo Keung-ha		Historical, Melodrama	
16 February	Story of Great Chun-hyang	대춘향전	Kim Hyang		Historical, Melodrama	
20 February	Wife and Mistress	처와 애인	Kim Seong-min		Melodrama	
1 March	A Woman's War	여성전선	Kim Ki-young	Jo Mi-ryeong; Park Am	Melodrama	
7 March	The Unforgettable Peoble	잊을 수 없는 사람들	Yu Jae-won		Melodrama	
21 March	Exorcism of Bae-Baeng-Yi	배뱅이굿	Yang Ju-nam		Historical	
1 April	The Devil	마인	Han Hyung-mo		Drama, Thriller	
19 April	Arirang	아리랑	Kim So-dong		Drama	
20 April	A Wild Chrysanthemum	산유화	Lee Yong-min		Melodrama	
27 April	The Confess	애원의 고백	Hong Seong-ki		Melodrama, Thriller	
12 May	A Life of the Woman	그 여자의 일생	Kim Han-il		Melodrama	
22 May	I Don't Like You	나는 너를 싫어한다	Kwon Yeong-sun		Melodrama	
23 May	The Daughter of a Bandit	산적의 딸	Yun Ye-dam		Historical, Action	
1 June	Love	사랑	Lee Kang-cheon		Melodrama	
2 July	Love Caused Pain	다정도 병이련가	Yun Bong-chun		Melodrama	
13 July	A Lady of Destiny	운명의 여인	Gang Won-ju	Um Aing-ran; Kim Yun-bong	Melodrama	
16 July	A Brier Flower	찔레꽃	Shin Kyeong-gyun		Melodrama	
18 July	The Wanderer	김삿갓	Lee Man-heung		Historical	
26 July	The Postwar Generation	전후파	Jo Jeong-ho		Drama	
5 September	The Princess Seon-Hwa	선화공주	Choi Sung-kwan		Historical	
18 September	The Lost Youth	잃어버린 청춘	Yu Hyun-mok	Choi Moo-ryong; Lee Kyung-hee	Melodrama	
28 September	The Star of Lost Paradise	실락원의 별	Hong Seong-ki	Kim Dong-won; Ju Jeung-ryu	Melodrama	
15 October	The Red and Blue Thread	청실홍실	Jeong Il-taek	Lee Min; Ju Jeung-ryu	Melodrama	
16 October	A Night of Harbor	항구의 일야	Kim Hwa-rang	Choi Moo-ryong; Jeon Ok	Melodrama	
23 October	Bong-i Kim Seondal	봉이 김선달	Han Hong-yeol		Historical	
11 November	The Night of Truth	진리의 밤	Kim Han-il		Melodrama	
15 November	The Pure Love	순애보	Han Hyeong-mo		Melodrama	
20 November	Farewell Sorrow!	가거라 슬픔이여	Jo Keung-ha		Melodrama	
30 November	The Sorrow of Wanderer	나그네 설움	Lee Sun-kyung		Melodrama	
10 December	The Life	인생화보	Lee Chang-chun		Melodrama	
18 December	The Palace of Ambition	풍운의 궁전	Jeong Chang-hwa		Historical, Action	
22 December	Lady of Freedom (sequel)	자유부인(속)	Kim Hwa-rang		Melodrama	
?	Don't Misunderstand	오해마세요	Kwon Yeong-sun		Comedy	
?	The Double Rainbow Hill	쌍무지개 뜨는 언덕	Son Jun		Melodrama	
?	The No-Deul Riverside	노들강변	Shin Kyeong-gyun		Melodrama	
?	Shadowless Pagoda	무영탑	Shin Sang-ok	Han Eun-jin; Kwak Geon	Historical, Melodrama	
?	Twilight Train	황혼열차	Kim Ki-young	Park Am; Do Kum-bong	Melodrama	
