= Woman of Fire =

- Poster for Woman of Fire (1971)
- Hangul: 화녀
- Hanja: 火女
- RR: Hwanyeo
- MR: Hwanyŏ
- Directed by: Kim Ki-young
- Written by: Kim Ki-young
- Produced by: Jung Jin-woo
- Starring: Namkoong Won; Youn Yuh-jung; Jeon Gye-hyeon; Choi Moo-ryong
- Cinematography: Jung Il-sung
- Edited by: Kim Hee-su
- Music by: Han Sang-ki
- Distributed by: Woo Jin Films Co., Ltd.
- Release date: April 1, 1971
- Running time: 100 minutes
- Country: South Korea
- Language: Korean
- Box office: $24,955

Woman of Fire (Korean: 화녀; RR: Hwanyeo) is a 1971 South Korean film directed by Kim Ki-young. This was the second film in Kim's Housemaid trilogy followed by Woman of Fire '82. The film is a remake of Kim's 1960 film The Housemaid.

== Plot ==
In South Korea, a man named Dong-sik and a woman named Myeong-ja are found dead near a poultry farm with multiple stab wounds. The police assume it is a robbery but also find Jeong-suk, the wife of Dong-sik as a person of interest. While a robber is suspected (owing to a confession from a crazed man), attention soon turns to Jeong-suk, particularly when discrepancies come to light such as a letter apparently from the dead woman. Throughout the film, the story of the two dead people come to light, which involves Myeong-ja having come to work for free at the farm of the family (as run by the wife) while recovering from trauma involving an attacker that had seen her leave her rural roots; unlike the wife, she is comfortable dealing with pests such as rats, with her at one point squashing a rat with her shoe. In fact, she doesn't want a great amount of pay, merely wanting to find a suitable husband. Dong-sik is a songwriter under the constant pressure of female would-be suitors such as Hye-suk, and when Jeong-suk has to go on business, she tasks Myeong-ja to guard him. Push comes to shove when Myeong-ja prevents Hye-suk from making advances on Dong-sik only to find herself in the arms of a drunken rape by him when he mistakes her for Hye-suk. The result is that she becomes pregnant, but when Jeong-suk finds out, she forces her to have an abortion.

Unfortunately, Myeong-ja finds revenge by taking revenge on their child and trapping them with the knowledge for blackmail. Another person happens to be tangled in their web when he is found dead by blunt force trauma. Eventually, tired of the game, Dong-sik goes with Myeong-ja to drink rat poison together, but he manages to make his way to the arms of his wife in order to tell her to make it look like he was stabbed to death. In the end, the last sequence of the film shows the wife out of the police station collapsing before losing a shoe as it washes away in a gutter.

== Production and analysis ==
There are considerable similarities between The Housemaid and Woman of Fire, which each have the women being the breadwinner of the family before the introduction of a maid to the equation. His later films Insect Woman (1972) and Beasts of Prey (1985) have touched upon similar dynamics within their portrayals of weak-willed men engaging in affairs that result in trouble. When Kim was asked about similarities between his films, he stated the following: "A carpenter builds homes relying on his talent and insight. A carpenter who is talented in handling wood builds a wooden house; one who's good with bricks builds a brick house. It's the same with me. Starting with 'The Housemaid,' and going through 'Woman of Fire' and 'Insect Woman,' the films that saw success were those about demon-like femme fatales who, for their own reasonings, destroy domestic peace. What is success? People flock to theaters because the films are well-made. So my calculation is that I'm proficient in this kind of genre."

This was the feature film debut for Youn Yuh-jung, who appeared in both two further films with Kim. Decades later, when she won the Academy Award for Best Supporting Actress in 2021, she gave thanks to Kim for their work together.

== Release ==
Woman of Fire was rescreened in South Korean cinemas on May 1, 2021.

== Cast ==
- Namkoong Won as Dong-shik
- Jeon Gye-hyeon as Jeong-suk
- Youn Yuh-jung as Myeong-ja
- Choi Moo-ryong as Detective
- Kim Ju-mi-hye
- O Yeong-a as Hye-ok
- Hwang Baek
- Chu Seok-yang as Ki-ja
- Lee Hoon
- Lee Ji-yeon

== Awards ==
- Festival de Cine de Sitges
  - Special Mention Best Actress (Youn Yuh-jung)
- Blue Dragon Film Awards
  - Best Director (Kim Ki-young)

== Bibliography ==
- Ahn, Min-hwa. "Representing the Anxious Middle Class: Camera Movement, Sound, and Color in The Housemaid and Woman of Fire". The House of Kim Ki-young. Archived from the original on 2004-05-06.
- Ahn, Min-hwa. "Woman of Fire". The House of Kim Ki-young. Archived from the original on 2004-05-06.
- Sin, Chang-Heui. "A Study of the Images of Women in Kim Ki-young's Films: Woman of Fire, Numi, and Carnivore". The House of Kim Ki-young. Archived from the original on 2003-12-09.
