= List of South Korean films of 1955 =

This is a list of films produced in South Korea in 1955.

Released	English title	Korean title	Director	Cast	Genre	Notes
1955
16 January	Chunhyangjeon	춘향전	Lee Gyu-hwan		Melodrama, Historical	
16 January	Dream	꿈	Shin Sang-ok		Historical Drama	
26 April	The Battle line of Freedom	자유전선	Kim Hong		Action, War	
12 May	The Everlasting Love	구원의 애정	Min Kyoung-sik		Melodrama	
24 May	Second Start	제2의 출발	Chung Chang-wha		Drama, Enlightenment	
11 June	The Boxes of Death	죽음의 상자	Kim Ki-young		Drama, Anticommunism	
13 August	Passionate Love	열애	Hong Seong-ki		Melodrama	
23 September	Piagol	피아골	Lee Kang-cheon		Drama, Anticommunism	
13 October	Yangsan Province	양산도	Kim Ki-young		Melodrama, Historical	
25 November	Sad Story of a Head Cutter	망나니비사	Kim Seong-min		Melodrama, Historical	
30 November	The Youth	젊은 그들	Shin Sang-ok		Historical, Action	
10 December	The Widow	미망인	Park Nam-ok		Melodrama	
?	Marriage Check-up	결혼진단	Lee Man-heung		Melodrama, Comedy	
?	The Castle of Hatred	원한의 성	Lee Man-heung		Melodrama, Anticommunism	
?	The Hill of Immortal Bird	불사조의 언덕	Jeon Chang-keun		Enlightenment, War	
