= List of South Korean films of 1956 =

This is a list of films produced in South Korea in 1956.

Released	English title	Korean title	Director	Cast	Genre	Notes
1956
15 January	The Crossroad	교차로	Yu Hyun-mok	Jo Mi-ryeong	Melodrama	
25 January	The Sea	해정	Park Sang-ho	Kang Kye-shik	Melodrama	
11 February	The Wedding Day	시집가는 날	Lee Byung-il	Choi Hyeon; Kim Yu-hui	Historical, Comedy	
12 February	The Tragedy of King Danjong	단종애사	Jeon Chang-keun		Historical	
19 February	Biryu	비류	Lee Man-heung		Melodrama	
21 February	The Flower of Relief	구원의 정화	Lee Man-heung		Historical, Religion	
27 March	The Virgin Star	처녀별	Yun Bong-chun		Historical, Melodrama	
4 April	Beat Back	격퇴	Lee Kang-cheon		Action, War	
10 April	Hyperbola of Youth	청춘쌍곡선	Han Hyeong-mo	Hwang Hae	Comedy	
15 May	A Cross in Gunfire	포화속의 십자가	Lee Yong-min	Kim Jin-kyu	Action, War	
21 May	An Overnight Official	벼락감투	Hong Il-myeong		Historical, Comedy	
28 May	A Lasting Regret	천추의 한	Ahn Jong-hwa		Historical, Melodrama	
9 June	Madame Freedom	자유부인	Han Hyeong-mo	Park Am; Kim Jeong-rim	Melodrama	
13 June	Prince Hodong and Princess Nakrang	왕자호동과 낙랑공주	Kim So-dong	Kim Dong-won; Jo Mi-ryeong	Historical, Melodrama	
17 June	Janghwa and Hongryeon Story	자유부인	Chung Chang-wha		Horror, Historical	
13 July	Ok-Dan-Chun	옥단춘	Kwon Yeong-sun		Historical, Melodrama	
25 July	Sadness of Heredity	유전의 애수	Yu Hyun-mok	Choi Moo-ryong; Moon Jung-suk	Melodrama	
11 September	Stagecoach of Life	인생역마차	Kim Seong-min	Lee Hyang	Gangster, Melodrama	
19 September	Prince in Yam Clothes	마의 태자	Jeon Chang-keun	Lee Hyang; Yoo Gye-seon	Historical	
25 September	Lover	애인	Hong Seong-ki	Ju Jeung-ryu	Melodrama	
16 October	The Life of Sim-Cheong	심청전	Lee Gyu-hwan		Historical	
1 November	The Wave of Love	애정파도	Mun Hwa-seong		Melodrama	
5 November	Nongae	논개	Yun Bong-chun	Kim Sam-hwa	Historical	
10 November	Touch-Me-Not	봉선화	Kim Ki-young	Na Gang-hui; An Seok-jin	Historical	
15 November	The Enemy of Woman	여성의 적	Kim Han-il	Jo Mi-ryeong; Kim Dong-won	Melodrama	
21 November	Holiday in Seoul	서울의 휴일	Lee Yong-min	Yang Mi-hui; No Neung-geol	Melodrama	
25 November	The Tragic Prince	사도세자	Ahn Jong-hwa		Historical	
31 December	Story of Lady Suk-Young	숙영낭자전	Sin Hyeon-ho		Historical, Melodrama	
?	An Idiot Adada	백치 아다다	Lee Kang-cheon	Na Ae-sim	Historical	
