= Defiance of a Teenager =

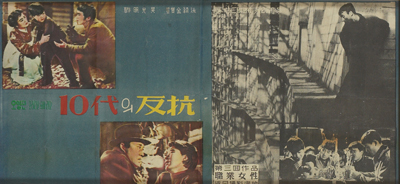
- Poster for Defiance of a Teenager (1959)
- Hangul: 10대의 반항
- Hanja: 10代의 反抗
- RR: 10daeui banhang
- MR: 10taeŭi panhang
- Directed by: Kim Ki-young
- Written by: O Yeong-jin
- Produced by: Lee Bong-yeong
- Starring: Hwang Hae-nam; Um Aing-ran
- Cinematography: Kim Deok-jin
- Edited by: O Yeong-geun
- Music by: Han Sang-ki
- Distributed by: Hyeob i Films Co., Ltd; Beoma Productions
- Release date: July 16, 1959
- Country: South Korea
- Language: Korean

Defiance of a Teenager (Korean: 10대의 반항; RR: 10daeui banhang) is a 1959 South Korean film directed by Kim Ki-young. It comes after First Snow and before Sad Pastorale in Kim's trilogy of films about human survival during wartime.

== Plot ==
A melodrama about a group of delinquent teenagers under the leadership of a corrupt boss.

== Cast ==
- Hwang Hae-nam
- Um Aing-ran
- Jo Mi-ryeong
- Ahn Sung-ki
- Hwang Jeong-sun

== Awards ==
=== Buil Film Award ===
Year	Category	Recipient	Result	Ref.
1960	Best Film	Defiance of a Teenager	Won	
1960	Best Director	Kim Ki-young	Won	
1960	Best Actress	Jo Mi-ryeong	Won	
