= The Sea Knows =

- Poster for The Sea Knows (1961)
- Hangul: 현해탄은 알고 있다
- Hanja: 玄海灘은 알고 있다
- RR: Hyeonhaetaneun algo itda
- MR: Hyŏnhaet'anŭn algo itta
- Directed by: Kim Ki-young
- Written by: Kim Ki-young
- Produced by: Kim Ki-young
- Starring: Kim Wun-ha; Gong Midori
- Cinematography: Choe Ho-jin
- Edited by: O Yeong-geun
- Music by: Han Sang-ki
- Distributed by: Korean Art Movies
- Release date: November 10, 1961
- Running time: 117 minutes
- Country: South Korea
- Language: Korean

The Sea Knows (Korean: 현해탄은 알고 있다; RR: Hyeonhaetaneun algo itda) is a 1961 South Korean film directed by Kim Ki-young.

== Plot ==
The film is a wartime melodrama about Aroun, a Korean living in Japan and conscripted into the army. He endures cruel treatment at the hands of the Japanese soldiers, and objections from the mother of his Japanese girlfriend. The film concludes with a U.S. bombing which kills all the Japanese soldiers, but leaves Aroun alive.

== Cast ==
- Kim Wun-ha as Aroun
- Gong Midori as Hideko
- Lee Ye-chun as Mori
- Lee Sang-sa as Inoue
- Kim Jin-kyu as Nakamura
- Kim Seok-hun
- Ju Jeung-ryu as Hideko's mother
- Kim Seung-ho
- Park Am
- Park No-sik

== Bibliography ==
- Kim, Sung-Eun. "Hyonhaetan Knows Everything". The House of Kim Ki-young. Archived from the original on 2004-05-10.
