= Goryeojang =

- Theatrical release poster
- Hangul: 고려장
- Hanja: 高麗葬
- RR: Goryeojang
- MR: Koryŏjang
- Directed by: Kim Ki-young
- Written by: Kim Ki-young
- Produced by: Kim Ki-young
- Starring: Kim Jin-kyu; Ju Jeung-ryu
- Cinematography: Kim Deok-jin
- Edited by: Kim Ki-young
- Music by: Han Sang-ki
- Distributed by: Korea Art Films Co., Ltd
- Release date: March 15, 1963
- Running time: 90 minutes
- Country: South Korea
- Language: Korean

Goryeojang (Korean: 고려장) is a 1963 South Korean drama film edited, written, produced and directed by Kim Ki-young.

== Plot ==
The film tells the story of a poor farm worker who, according to local tradition, must take his 70-year-old mother into the mountains to die. Deciding to break the custom, he instead returns home with his mother.

== Cast ==
- Kim Jin-kyu
- Ju Jeung-ryu
- Kim Bo-ae
- Kim Dong-won
- Park Am

== Release ==
In February 2012, Taewon Entertainment (in partnership with the Korean Film Archive) released the film on DVD.

== Bibliography ==
- Kim, Sung-Eun. "Koryojang". The House of Kim Ki-young. Archived from the original on 2003-12-30.
- Lee, Jee-Eun. "Koryojang: Unfolding Compressed Space". The House of Kim Ki-young. Archived from the original on 2003-12-10.
