= Jo Mi-ryung =

- Hangul: 조미령
- RR: Jo Miryeong
- MR: Cho Miryŏng

Jo Mi-ryung or Jo Mi-ryeong is a Korean name and may also refer to:

- Jo Mi-ryeong (actress, born 1929), South Korean actress
- Jo Mi-ryung (actress, born 1973), South Korean actress
