= Insect Woman =

Insect Woman may refer to:

- The Insect Woman, a 1963 Japanese drama film
- Insect Woman (1972 film), a South Korean film
