= Free Woman (disambiguation) =

"Free Woman" is a song by Lady Gaga.

Free Woman may also refer to:

- Free Woman (film), a 1982 South Korean film by Kim Ki-young
- A Free Woman, a 1954 Italian film by Vittorio Cottafavi
- The Freewoman, a 1911–1912 feminist journal
- Statue of a Liberated Woman or Free Woman, a 1960 statue in Baku
- "Free Woman", a song by Welsh singer-songwriter Marina, from the deluxe edition of her album, Ancient Dreams in a Modern Land, released in 2022
- "Free Woman", a 1936 short story by Katharine Bush upon which the film Honeymoon in Bali was partially based
