= Asphalt (1964 film) =

1964 film

- Poster for Asphalt (1964)
- Hangul: 아스팔트
- RR: Aseupalteu
- MR: Asŭp'alt'ŭ
- Directed by: Kim Ki-young
- Written by: Kim Ki-young
- Produced by: Park Won-seok
- Starring: Kim Jin-kyu; Jang Dong-hee
- Cinematography: You Young-jo
- Edited by: Kim Ki-young
- Music by: Han Sang-ki
- Distributed by: Korean Art Movies
- Release date: April 10, 1964
- Country: South Korea
- Language: Korean

Asphalt (Korean: 아스팔트) is a 1964 South Korean film directed by Kim Ki-young.

== Synopsis ==
A revenge melodrama about a criminal whose wife is killed during his arrest. After serving 20 years in prison he attempts to kill the arresting officer's wife out of revenge, but fails and is again imprisoned.

== Cast ==
- Kim Jin-kyu
- Jang Dong-hee
- Ju Jeung-ryu
- Lee Dae-yub
- Kim Hee-kap
- Kim Nan-yeong
- Park Am
- Kim Ok
- Kim Wun-Ha
- Na Ae-sim

== Bibliography ==
- "Asphalt". The House of Kim Ki-young. Archived from the original on 2004-05-08.
