= Lost Youth (disambiguation) =

Lost Youth (Gioventù perduta) is a 1948 Italian film.

Lost Youth may also refer to:

- "Lost Youth" (Judge John Deed), a 2006 television episode
- "Lost Youth" (Roseanne), a 1995 television episode
- The Lost Youth, a South Korean film of 1957
