= Hunting of Fools =

- Poster for Hunting of Fools (1984)
- Hangul: 바보사냥
- RR: Babosanyang
- MR: Pabosanyang
- Directed by: Kim Ki-young
- Written by: Kim Ki-young
- Produced by: Park Chong-chan
- Starring: Eom Sim-jeong; Kim Seong-geun
- Cinematography: Seo Jeong-min
- Edited by: Hyeon Dong-chun
- Music by: Kim Jung-gil
- Distributed by: Hwa Chun Trading Company
- Release date: December 1, 1984
- Running time: 100 minutes
- Country: South Korea
- Language: Korean

Hunting of Fools (Korean: 바보사냥; RR: Babosanyang) is a 1984 South Korean film directed by Kim Ki-young.

== Synopsis ==
A social drama about two men who have failed to graduate from college.

== Cast ==
- Eom Sim-jeong
- Kim Seong-geun
- Bae Gyu-bin
- Kim In-moon
- Kim Won-seop
- Yoon In-Ja
- No Gyeong-sin
- Park Am
- Kim Sung-kyom
- Jang Hyeok

== Bibliography ==
- Babo sanyang (1984) at IMDb
- Berry, Chris. "Hunting of Fools". The House of Kim Ki-young. Archived from the original on 2004-05-06.
- "Hunting for Idiots (Babosanyang)(1984)". KMDb Korean Movie Database.
