= Sad Pastorale =

- Film poster
- Hangul: 슬픈 목가
- Hanja: 슬픈 牧歌
- RR: Seulpeun mokga
- MR: Sŭlp'ŭn mokka
- Directed by: Kim Ki-young
- Written by: Jeong Bi-seok; Lim Hee-Jae
- Produced by: Park Un-sam
- Starring: Kim Seok-hun; Kim Ui-hyang; Choi Eun-hee
- Cinematography: Choe Gyeong-ok
- Edited by: Kim Ki-young
- Music by: Han Sang-ki
- Distributed by: Korean Distributor's Association
- Release date: March 24, 1960
- Country: South Korea
- Language: Korean

Sad Pastorale (Korean: 슬픈 목가) is a 1960 South Korean film directed by Kim Ki-young.

== Premise ==
The film is a melodrama about a man who resigns from the army to become a farmer.

== Cast ==
- Kim Seok-hun as Kang Byeong-cheol
- Kim Ui-hyang as Lee Shin-ok
- Choi Eun-hee as Han Do-suk

== Bibliography ==
- Berry, Chris. "A Sad Pastoral Song". The House of Kim Ki-young. Archived from the original on 2004-05-08.
