= Korean Film Archive =

Film archive in South Korea

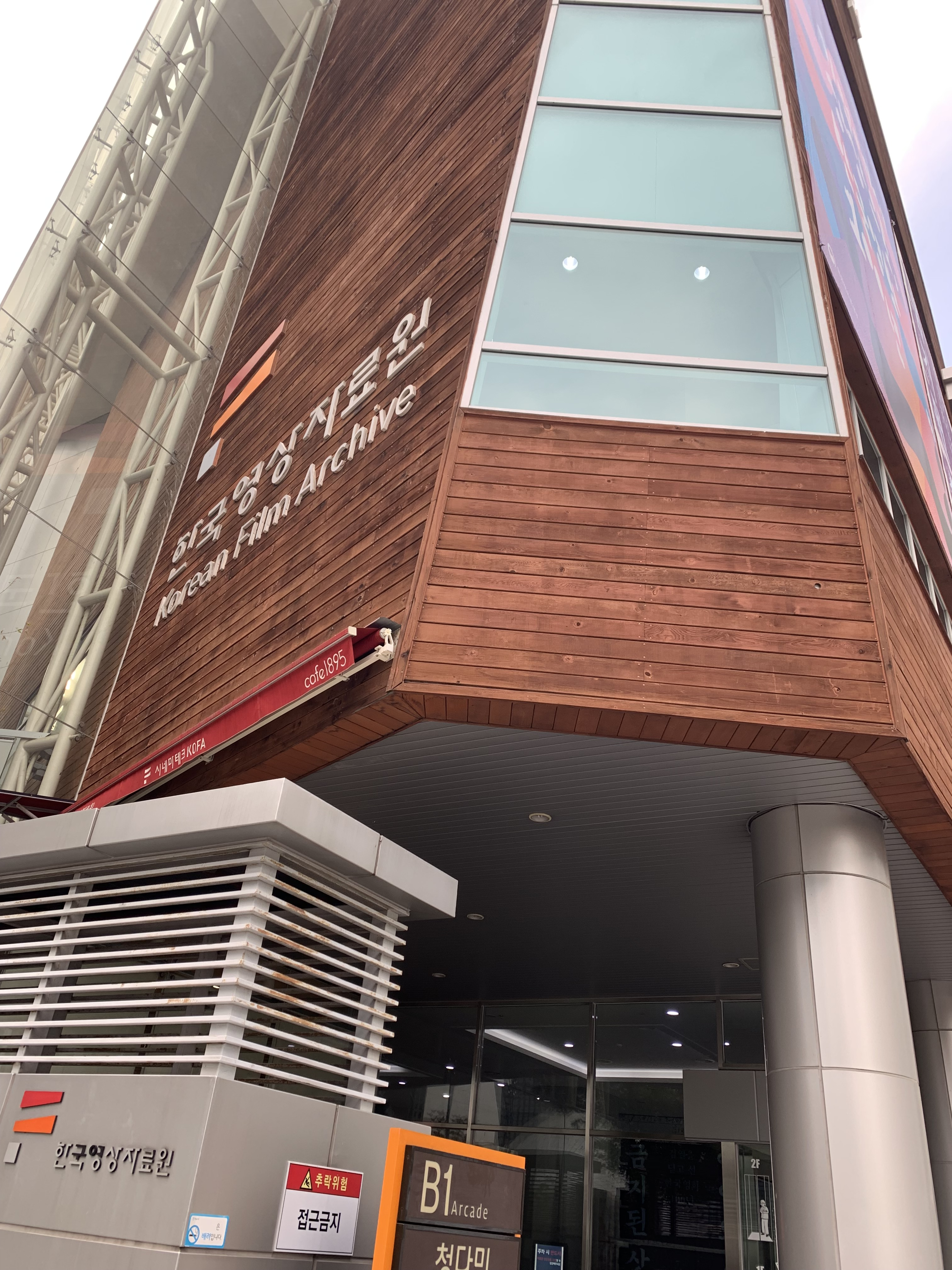
- Headquarters (2019)
- Type: Governmental, nonprofit
- Purpose: Preservation of Korean cinema
- Headquarters: 400 WorldCupbuk-ro, Mapo District, Seoul, South Korea
- Parent organization: Ministry of Culture, Sports and Tourism
- Website: eng.koreafilm.or.kr/main (in English)

Korean name
- Hangul: 한국영상자료원
- Hanja: 韓國映像資料院
- Revised Romanization: Hanguk yeongsang jaryowon
- McCune–Reischauer: Han'guk yŏngsang charyowŏn

The Korean Film Archive (KOFA; Korean: 한국영상자료원), or the Korean Federation of Film Archives, is the sole film archive in South Korea with nationwide coverage. It was founded in Seoul in 1974 as a non-profit organization. In 1976 KOFA joined the International Federation of Film Archives (FIAF) as an observer, and gained its full membership of FIAF in 1985.

KOFA's main duties are to collect, preserve and categorize films and film-related materials, as well as to foster accessibility to its collections. Most of remaining originals and copies of Korean films are preserved in KOFA. Its main center is in Sangam-dong, Seoul, with two local branch centers in Busan and Bucheon, and a secondary preservation center in Seongnam. Its main center has several public facilities, including Cinematheque KOFA, Korean Film Museum, and a reference library. Recently KOFA has concentrated on digitization of Korean films, and has published several features of the Classic Korean Cinema DVD Collections. It also operates the most reliable online database of Korean films, as well as an online film streaming service.

== History ==
It was established as a Korean film storage center in 1974 in Namsan-dong, Jung-gu, Seoul, and moved to Seocho-dong in 1990. Since 1991, it has been renamed as Korea Media Center by foundations. It was reorganized into a special corporation based on the Motion Picture Promotion Act in 2002. It built its own building in Sangam-dong, Mapo-gu in May 2007 and formally reopened in the following year. It is composed of auxiliary and restored facilities equipped with an anti-air and photo-related facility for preserving film and other materials, Cinema Tech that provides movie screening and current affairs services, and a cinema that illuminates Korean film industry through the exhibition of film related materials. It is a member of the International Federation of Film Executions (FIAF) regular members, who hosted the Federation General Meeting in Seoul in 2002. It is a public organization for cultural services under the Ministry of Culture, Sports and Tourism in Korea government.

== Functions ==
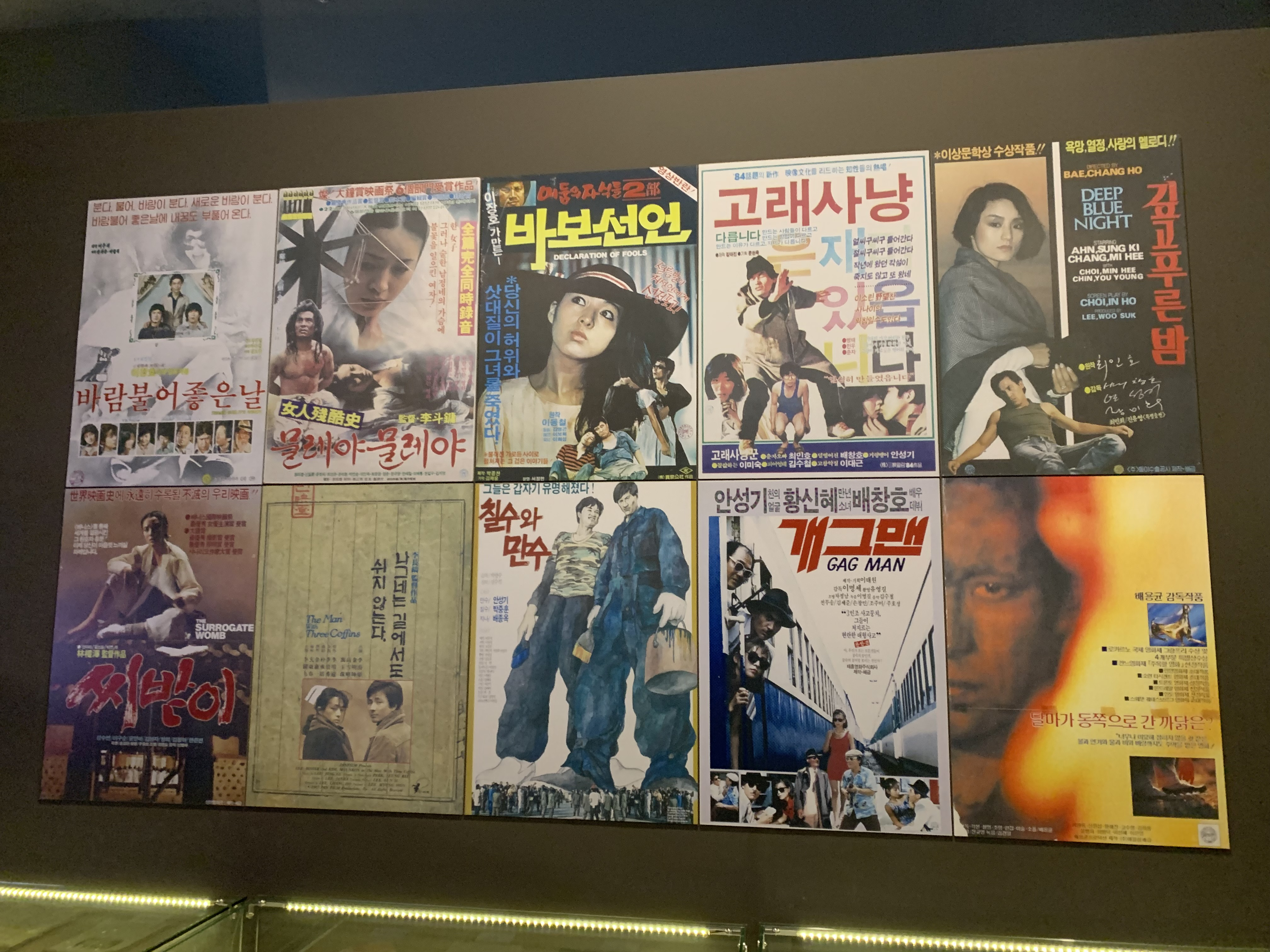
Some posters on display in the Archive's museum (2019)

The archive provides the following services:

- Film Collection and Categorization
- Film Preservation, Restoration and Digitization
- Film Screening and Referential Services
- Publication of Academic and Referential Resources
- Operation of Online Databases on Korean Cinema
- KOFA Film Collection Search
- Korean Movie Database online
- Operation of the Korean Film Museum

== Blu-ray releases ==
To coincide with its upcoming 40th anniversary in 2014, KOFA started releasing restored Korean classic and lesser known films on Blu-ray.

One of the criteria for release of the films is their place in TOP 100 Korean films list (although there has been some films released in later years that are not on the list).

The Housemaid, Aimless Bullet and The March of Fools received equal number of votes and they occupy the first place.

Spine No.	Title	Director	Original release	TOP 100 No.
001	The Housemaid	Kim Ki-young	1960	1.
001-1	The Housemaid (reissue)	Kim Ki-young	1960	1.
002	The March of Fools	Ha Gil-jong	1975	3.
003	Heavenly Homecoming to Stars	Lee Jang-ho	1974	6.
004	Chilsu and Mansu	Park Kwang-su	1988	63.
005	Gagman	Lee Myung-se	1989	64.
006	Aimless Bullet	Yu Hyun-mok	1961	2.
007	The Last Witness	Lee Doo-yong	1980	50.
008	People in the Slum	Bae Chang-ho	1982	55.
009	Sopyonje	Im Kwon-taek	1993	12.
010	Lovers in Woomukbaemi	Jang Sun-woo	1990	66.
011	Ieodo	Kim Ki-young	1977	48.
012	Jagko	Im Kwon-taek	1980	52.
013	A Fine, Windy Day	Lee Jang-ho	1980	7.
014	A Day Off	Lee Man-hee	1968	43.
015	White Badge	Chung Ji-young	1992	73.
016	The Devil's Stairway	Lee Man-hee	1964	-
017	Goryeojang	Kim Ki-young	1963	29.
018	Mother and a Guest	Shin Sang-ok	1961	9.
019	Green Rain	Jung Jin-woo	1966	37.
020	North Korean Partisan in South Korea	Chung Ji-young	1990	68.
021	The Flower in Hell	Shin Sang-ok	1958	23.
022	Whale Hunting	Bae Chang-ho	1984	57.
023	The Coachman	Kang Dae-jin	1961	5.
024	The Road to Sampo	Lee Man-hee	1975	46.
025	Burning Mountain	Kim Soo-yong	1967	38.
026	Sorum	Yoon Jong-chan	2001	88.
027	The Hut	Lee Doo-yong	1981	51.
028	Declaration of Fools	Lee Jang-ho	1983	11.
029	A Bloodthirsty Killer	Lee Yong-min	1965	-
030	A Hometown in Heart	Yoon Yong-gyu	1949	18.
031	Black Republic	Park Kwang-su	1990	69.
032	A Story of Hong Gil-dong	Shin Dong-heon	1967	-
032	Hopi and Chadol Bawi	Shin Dong-heon	1967	-
033	The Marines Who Never Returned	Lee Man-hee	1963	30.
034	Heungbu and Nolbu	Kang Tae-woong	1967	-
034	Kongjwi and Patjwi	Kang Tae-woong	1978	-
035	A Dwarf Launches a Little Ball	Lee Won-se	1981	54.
036	My Love, My Bride	Lee Myung-se	1990	70.
036	First Love	Lee Myung-se	1993	-

== See also ==
- International Federation of Film Archives
- Cinematheque
- Cinema of Korea
