= The Life of Na Woon-gyu =

- Film poster
- Hangul: 나운규 일생
- Hanja: 羅雲奎 一生
- RR: Na Ungyu ilsaeng
- MR: Na Un'gyu ilsaeng
- Directed by: Choi Moo-ryong
- Written by: Jeon Beom-sung; Yu Yeol; Choe Seong-gyu; Kim Gang-yun
- Produced by: Hong Ui-seon
- Starring: Choi Moo-ryong; Park Am
- Cinematography: Kim Deok-jin
- Edited by: Kim Hee-su
- Music by: Jeon Jong-kun
- Production company: Yeon-hap Films
- Release date: 1967
- Running time: 119 minutes
- Country: South Korea
- Language: Korean

The Life of Na Woon-gyu (Korean: 나운규 일생) is a 1967 South Korean drama film about the life and death of Na Woon-gyu, who was a film actor and director who struggled for the rise of Korean cinema during Japanese rule of Korea. Na was played by the film's actor and director Choi Moo-ryong, who was the father of Choi Min-soo.

== Cast ==
- Choi Moo-ryong
- Park Am
- Um Aing-ran
- Kim Ji-mee
- Jo Mi-ryeong
- Lee Bin-hwa
- Choi Nam-Hyun
- Jeong Chang-geun
- Jeong Ae-ran
- Park Ji-hyeon
- Lee Soon-jae
