= Insect Woman (1972 film) =

The Insect Woman
- Theatrical film poster
- Hangul: 충녀
- Hanja: 蟲女
- RR: Chungnyeo
- MR: Ch'ungnyŏ
- Directed by: Kim Ki-young
- Written by: Kim Ki-young; Kim Seung-ok
- Produced by: Han Jin-seop
- Starring: Youn Yuh-jung; Jeon Gye-hyeon
- Cinematography: Jung Il-sung
- Edited by: Hyeon Dong-chun
- Music by: Han Sang-ki
- Distributed by: Hanrim Films
- Release date: October 6, 1972
- Running time: 110 minutes
- Country: South Korea
- Language: Korean
- Box office: $2,341

The Insect Woman (Korean: 충녀; RR: Chungnyeo) is a 1972 South Korean film directed by Kim Ki-young.

== Plot ==
A melodrama about a professor under psychiatric care because of a mental breakdown due to the stress brought on by an extramarital affair.

== Cast ==
- Youn Yuh-jung as Lee Myung Ja
- Jeon Gye-hyeon
- Namkoong Won as Dong Shik
- Kim Ju-mi
- Park In-chan
- Lee Dae-keun
- Kim Ho-jeong
- Sin Jong-seop
- Hwang Baek
- Park Am

== Release ==
In February 2012, Taewon Entertainment, in partnership with the Korean Film Archive, had released the film on DVD.

== Awards ==
- Baeksang Arts Awards (1973)
  - Best Director (Kim Ki-young)
  - Best Actor (Namkoong Won)

== Bibliography ==
- "Kim, Ki-young Master of Madness (From the 41st San Francisco International Film Festival)". cinekorea.com. Archived from the original on 2008-02-12.
- Lee, Sun-Hwa. "The Insect Woman". The House of Kim Ki-young. Archived from the original on 2004-05-08.
