= Yoon Yong-gyu =

Korean filmmaker (born 1913)

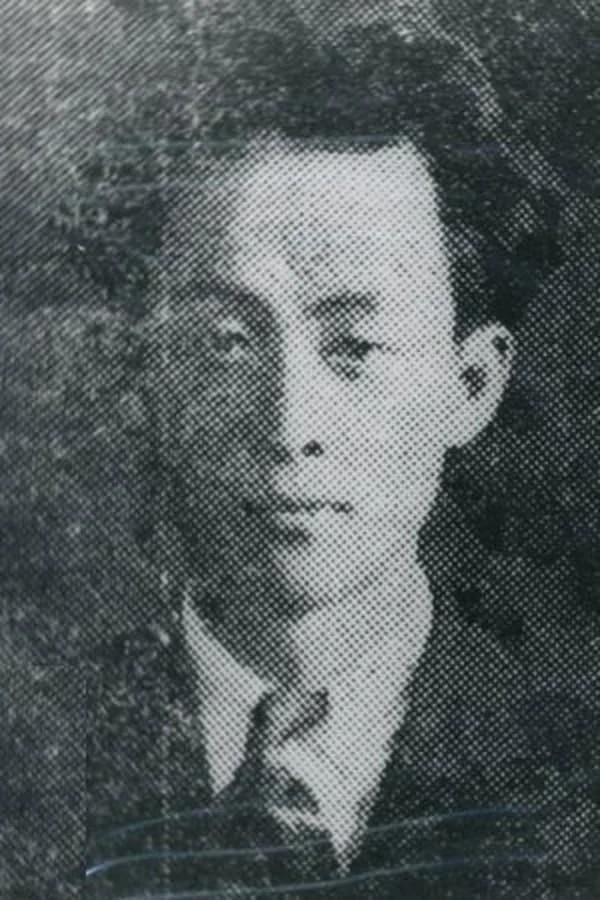
- Born: 1913; Daegu, Korea, Empire of Japan
- Occupation: Film director
- Notable work: A Hometown in Heart (1949)

Yoon Yong-gyu (Korean: 윤용규; Hanja: 尹龍奎; born 1913, date of death unknown), also known as Yun Yong-kyu, was a Korean film director. He made his first film A Hometown in Heart (1949) in South Korea before defecting to the North to pursue his filmmaking career.

== Biography ==
Yoon was born in 1913 in Daegu, Korea, Empire of Japan. He defected to North Korea before the outbreak of the 1950–1953 Korean War, and worked as director of North Korea's National Film Studio (국립영화촬영소) in 1952.

The classic A Hometown in Heart, released on DVD in 2011 by the Korean Federation of Film Archives and on Blu-ray in 2023 by Blue Kino, was one of the most important films made in Korea after its liberation from Japan. Based on Ham Se Deok's play Tongseung (A Little Monk), it tells the story of Do-seong, a child monk (Yoo Min) who longs for his mother, who has abandoned him. Meanwhile, a childless widow (Choi Eun-hee) takes to the child. Stanley Park remade the film in 2014 as A Hometown in my Heart (내 마음의 고향; Nae maeumui gohyang).

Teen Guerrillas was one of the first North Korean films, shot during the war.

== Filmography ==
- 1949: A Hometown in Heart (내 마음의 고향; Nae maeumui gohyang)
- 1951: Teen Guerrillas or Boy Partisans (소년 빨찌산; Sonyeon ppaljjisan)
- 1952: Defenders of the Native Land (향토를 지키는 사람들; Hyangtoreul jikineun saramdeul)
- 1954: The Miss of Guerrillas or Partisan Girl (빨치산 처녀; Ppalchisan cheonyeo)
- 1955: The Newlyweds (신혼 부부; Sinhon bubu) (codirected by Dong-in Joo)
- 1957: Village People (오란청; Orancheong)
- 1958: Suribong (수리봉) (codirected by Youngseob Joo)
- 1959: Legend of Chunhyang (춘향전; Chunhyangjeon)
- 1960: Yeoseong yeongung gwangbu (여성 영웅 광부)
- 1960: Dangyeolui norae (당열의 노래)
- 1972: Abyeon gongdeul (codirected by Deok Kyu Kim)
- 1980: The Tale of Chun Hyang (춘향전; Chunhyangjeon) (codirected by Won Jun Yu)
