= The Housemaid (1960 film) =

1960 film by Kim Ki-young

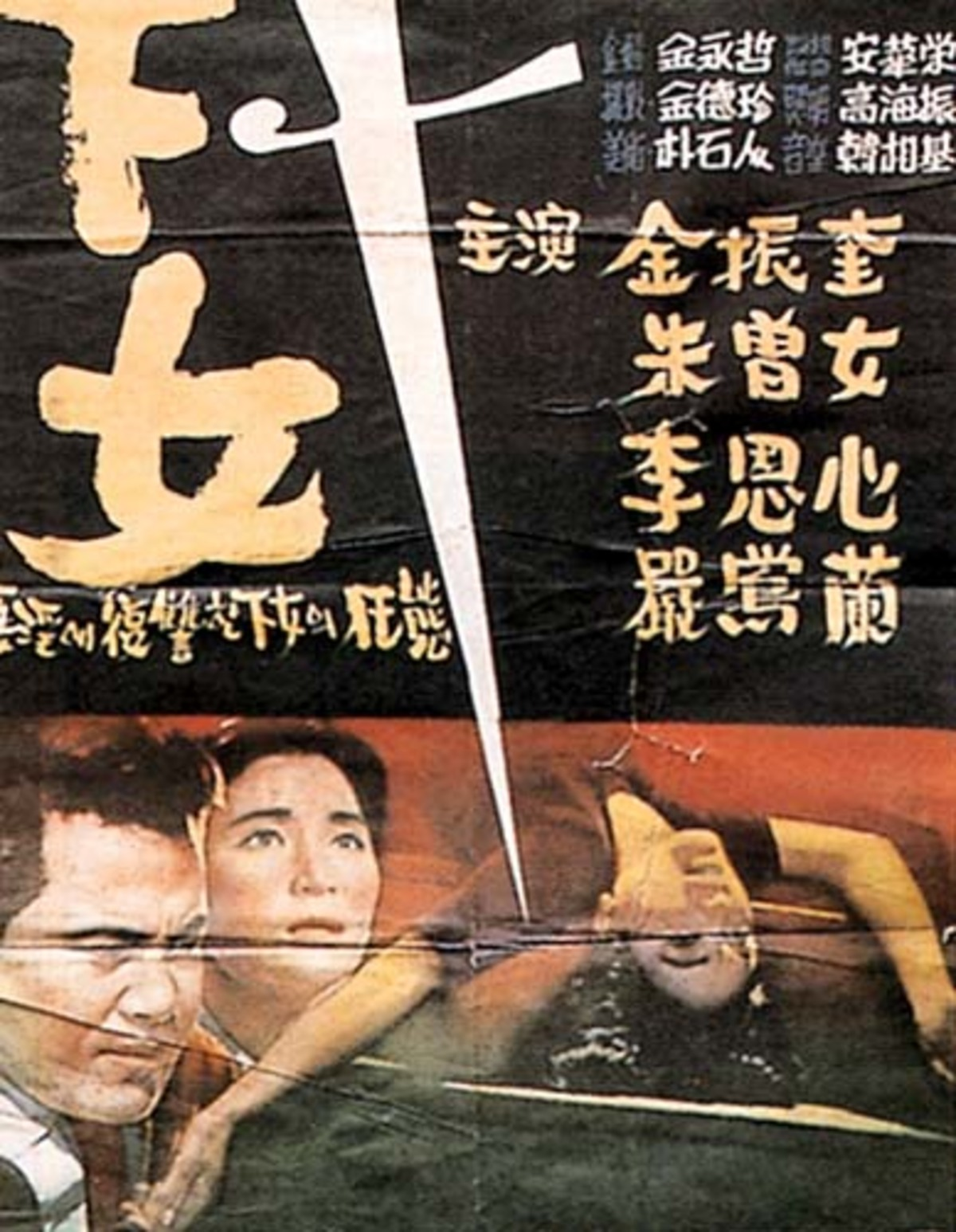
- Theatrical poster
- Hangul: 하녀
- Hanja: 下女
- RR: Hanyeo
- MR: Hanyŏ
- Directed by: Kim Ki-young
- Written by: Kim Ki-young
- Produced by: Kim Ki-young
- Starring: Lee Eun-shim; Kim Jin-kyu; Ju Jeung-ryu; Um Aing-ran; Ahn Sung-ki
- Cinematography: Kim Deok-jin
- Edited by: Kim Ki-young
- Music by: Han Sang-gi
- Distributed by: Kuk Dong; Seki Trading Co.
- Release date: November 3, 1960
- Running time: 108 minutes
- Country: South Korea
- Language: Korean
- Box office: $35,687

The Housemaid (Korean: 하녀; RR: Hanyeo) is a 1960 South Korean film, produced, written and directed by Kim Ki-young. It stars Lee Eun-shim, Ju Jeung-nyeo and Kim Jin-kyu. It has been described in Koreanfilm.org as a "consensus pick as one of the top three Korean films of all time". It is the first film in Kim's Housemaid trilogy and is followed by Woman of Fire and Woman of Fire '82. The film was remade in 2010 by Im Sang-soo.

The film is a domestic horror, following the story of an upper-middle-class family falling into destruction due to the introduction of a sexually predatory femme fatale housemaid into the household.

== Plot ==
A piano teacher, Mr. Dong-sik Kim, reads a newspaper story to his wife about a man falling in love with his maid. Mr. Kim works at a factory of primarily female employees, as the piano accompanist for the factory's extracurricular choir group. (Note: After the Korean War, when economic strife became more prevalent in a time of national division, women were sent away to earn more money for their families. They would often live in these factories, so many extracurricular activities were offered for time outside of work hours.) Mr. Kim is popular among the women at the factory. One of them, Kyeung-Hee "Miss Cho" Cho, pressures her friend to write a letter to Mr. Kim confessing how much she is infatuated by him. This ends poorly, as her friend is subsequently fired from the factory. Miss Cho attempts to further pursue Mr. Kim by taking up his offer of piano lessons, which he proposed to help earn more income during his wife's pregnancy.

Mr. Kim has just moved into a two-story house with his pregnant wife and two children, much larger than their previous residence. Mrs. Kim, also supporting the family as a dressmaker, becomes too exhausted to clean the house, and so Mr. Kim asks Miss Cho if she can find a woman who would be interested in becoming Kim's housemaid. Miss Cho returns with Myung-Sook, a cleaner from the factory. She behaves strangely as their new housemaid, catching rats with her hands, teasing the Kim children, and spying on Mr. Kim while he lays with his wife and as he is giving Miss Cho piano lessons.

At the factory, Miss Cho learns that her friend has committed suicide after being fired, due to being overcome by the pressure of not being able to secure a new job. Distraught, Miss Cho confesses later that day to Mr. Kim that she was actually the one in love with him, not her friend. Miss Cho then attempts to fling herself at Mr. Kim, who rejects her. Myung-Sook watches this entire encounter from afar. She uses this as her opportunity to make a move, threatening to blackmail Mr. Kim over what she saw of him and Miss Cho. Distraught, Mr. Kim succumbs to her and the two engage in an affair.

Myung-Sook feels ill as the weeks pass, revealing her pregnancy by Mr. Kim. Mr. Kim eventually decides to come clean to his wife, who, despite her initial depression over the affair, convinces Myung-Sook to throw herself down the flight of stairs that leads to the second story, which successfully results in her having a miscarriage. After this incident, Myung-Sook's behavior becomes increasingly erratic. She threatens to kill Mr. Kim's newborn son. Mrs. Kim fights her off as she tries to grab the baby. Myung-Sook then offers Mr. Kim's other son water, and after he drinks it, she says that she has poured rat poison into it. As she tells him this, he panics and falls to his death down a flight of stairs. Myung-Sook later states that it was just normal tap water.

Instead of turning her in to the police, Mrs. Kim offers to support Myung-sook in order to keep her from losing her job and damaging Mr. Kim's reputation in the fallout, saying that Myung-Sook can have anything she wants; Myung-Sook then asks to have Mr. Kim. She forces him to move upstairs into her room while Mrs. Kim labors over her sewing machine, falling asleep at her work every day. Unable to stand their new arrangement, both the wife and daughter attempt to poison Myung-sook, to no avail. Myung-sook persuades Mr. Kim to commit suicide with her by swallowing rat poison on the grounds that she will not harm anyone else in his family. He crawls downstairs and dies next to his wife, asking her to "Take good care of the children."

The film ends with the piano teacher reading the story from a newspaper with his wife, returning to the very beginning of the film. The film's narrative has apparently been told by the piano teacher, who then warns the audience that this is the sort of thing that could happen to anyone.

== Cast ==
- Kim Jin-kyu as Dong-sik Kim (the husband/father)
- Ju Jeung-ryu as Mrs. Kim (the wife/mother)
- Lee Eun-shim (이은심; 李恩心) as Myung-sook (the housemaid)
- Um Aing-ran as Kyung-hee Cho (the factory worker who takes piano lessons)
- Ko Seon-ae as Seon-young Kwak (the factory worker who commits suicide)
- Ahn Sung-ki as Chang-soon Kim (the son)
- Lee Yoo-ri as Ae-soon Kim (the daughter)
- Kang Seok-je
- Na Jeong-ok

== Reception and legacy ==
In 2003, Jean-Michel Frodon, editor-in-chief of Cahiers du cinéma, wrote that the discovery of The Housemaid by the West, over 40 years after the film's debut, was a "marvelous feeling—marvelous not just because one finds in writer-director Kim Ki-young a truly extraordinary image maker, but in his film such an utterly unpredictable work". On the review aggregator website Rotten Tomatoes, 100% of 5 critics' reviews are positive.

Comparing the director to Luis Buñuel, Frodon wrote Kim is "capable of probing deep into the human mind, its desires and impulses, while paying sarcastic attention to the details". He called The Housemaid "shocking", noting that "the shocking nature of the film is both disturbing and pleasurable". Frodon pointed out that The Housemaid was only one early major film in the director's career, and that Kim Ki-young would continue "running wild through obsessions and rebellion" with his films for decades to come.

Director Bong Joon Ho stated that The Housemaid served as an inspiration for his 2019 film Parasite. Both films involve lower-class characters threatening the stability of an upper-class family. Bong had previously spoken about The Housemaid on its 2013 Criterion Collection edition. As part of the Academy Museum of Motion Pictures' two-year exhibition, Director's Inspiration: Bong Joon Ho, the film was also included among nine features personally selected by Bong for its 2026 screening series, "A Lifetime of Inspiration: Bong Joon Ho."

== Bibliography ==
- Ahn, Min-hwa. "The Housemaid". The House of Kim Ki-young. Archived from the original on 2003-12-09.
- Ahn, Min-hwa. "Representing the Anxious Middle Class: Camera Movement, Sound, and Color in The Housemaid and Woman of Fire". The House of Kim Ki-young. Archived from the original on 2004-05-06.
- An, Jin-soo. "The Housemaid and Troubled Masculinity in the 1960s". The House of Kim Ki-young. Archived from the original on 2003-12-12.
- Kim, Kyung-hyun (2004). "8. Lethal Work: Domestic Space and Gender Troubles in Happy End and The Housemaid". The Remasculinization of Korean Cinema. Durham and London: Duke University Press. pp. 233–258. ISBN 0-8223-3267-1.
- Kim, Soyoung. "The Housemaid and the Korean Woman's Film". The House of Kim Ki-young. Archived from the original on 2004-10-13.
- Park, Jiye. "Gothic Imagination in Carnivore and The Housemaid". The House of Kim Ki-young. Archived from the original on 2003-12-10.
