= Woman of Fire '82 =

The Woman of Fire '82
- Poster
- Hangul: 화녀'82
- Hanja: 火女'82
- RR: Hwanyeo'82
- MR: Hwanyŏ'82
- Directed by: Kim Ki-young
- Written by: Kim Ki-young
- Produced by: Jeong Do-hwan
- Starring: Kim Ji-mee; Na Young-hee; Jeon Moo-song; Kim Hae-sook
- Cinematography: Jung Il-sung
- Edited by: Hyeon Dong-chun
- Music by: Han Sang-ki
- Distributed by: Kuk Dong; Seki Trading Co. Shin Han Art Films Co., Ltd.
- Release date: June 26, 1982
- Running time: 115 minutes
- Country: South Korea
- Language: Korean

The Woman of Fire '82 (Korean: 화녀'82; RR: Hwanyeo'82) is a 1982 South Korean film written and directed by Kim Ki-young. This was the third film in Kim's Housemaid trilogy.

== Plot ==
A variation on Kim's classic The Housemaid (1960). The lives of a composer and his chicken-farming wife are thrown into turmoil when a young woman comes to work as a maid.

== Cast ==
- Kim Ji-mee
- Na Young-hee
- Jeon Moo-song
- Kim Hae-sook
- Yeo Jae-ha
- Kim Sung-kyom
- Kim Won-seop
- Cho Ju-mi
- Lee Yeong-ho
- Park Yae-sook

== Bibliography ==
- Ahn, Min-hwa. "Woman of Fire '82". The House of Kim Ki-young. Archived from the original on 2004-09-08.
- "Kim, Ki-young Master of Madness (From the 41st San Francisco International Film Festival)". cinekorea.com. Archived from the original on 2009-02-06.
