= Free Woman (film) =

- Poster for Free Woman (1982)
- Hangul: 자유처녀
- Hanja: 自由處女
- RR: Jayucheonyeo
- MR: Chayuch'ŏnyŏ
- Directed by: Kim Ki-young
- Written by: Lee Mun-ung
- Produced by: Jeong Do-hwan
- Starring: Ahn So-young; Shin Seong-il
- Cinematography: Jung Pil-si
- Edited by: Hyeon Dong-chun
- Music by: Han Sang-ki
- Distributed by: Shin Han Films Co., Ltd.
- Release date: October 29, 1982
- Running time: 95 minutes
- Country: South Korea
- Language: Korean

Free Woman (Korean: 자유처녀) is a 1982 South Korean film directed by Kim Ki-young.

== Plot ==
A melodrama about a Korean woman who has lived in Spain pursuing her Ph.D. in Korea.

== Cast ==
- Ahn So-young
- Shin Seong-il
- Kim Won-seop
- Han Seong-gyeong
- Kim Chung-chul
- Cho Ju-mi
- Han U-ri
- Kim Seong-geun
- Lee Yeong-ho
- Yoo Myeong-sun

== Bibliography ==
- Berry, Chris. "Free Lady". The House of Kim Ki-young. Archived from the original on 2004-05-10.
