= Beasts of Prey =

1985 film

- Poster for Beasts of Prey (1985)
- Hangul: 육식동물
- Hanja: 肉食動物
- RR: Yuksikdongmul
- MR: Yuksiktongmul
- Directed by: Kim Ki-young
- Written by: Kim Ki-young
- Produced by: Jeong Do-hwan
- Starring: Kim Sung-kyom; No Gyeong-sin
- Cinematography: Joo Hong-shik
- Edited by: Hyeon Dong-chun
- Music by: Han Sang-ki
- Distributed by: Shin Han Films
- Release date: March 23, 1985
- Running time: 105 minutes
- Country: South Korea
- Language: Korean

Beasts of Prey (Korean: 육식동물), also known as Carnivore and Carnivorous Animals, is a 1985 South Korean film directed by Kim Ki-young.

== Plot ==
A social drama about a man with an inferiority complex to his wife. When he seeks consolation in an extramarital affair, his mistress and wife conspire to set up a plan for sharing him.

== Cast ==
- Kim Sung-kyom
- No Gyeong-sin
- Chung Jae-soon
- Kim Seong-geun
- Han U-ri
- Yang Hui-ran
- Eom Sim-jeong
- Bae Gyu-bin
- Choe Il
- Yeo Jae-ha

== Bibliography ==
- Lee, Sun-hwa. "Language of Artifice and Exaggeration: Carnivore". The House of Kim Ki-young. Archived from the original on 2004-10-14.
- Lee, Youn-Yi. "Carnivore: Male Masochism as Frustration and the Abject in the Imaginary". [The House of Kim Ki-young]. Archived from the original on 2004-05-05.
- Park, Jiye. "Gothic Imagination in Carnivore and The Housemaid". The House of Kim Ki-young. Archived from the original on 2003-12-10.
- Sin, Chang-Heui. "A Study of the Images of Women in Kim Ki-young's Films: Woman of Fire, Numi, and Carnivore". The House of Kim Ki-young. Archived from the original on 2003-12-09.
