= First Snow (1958 film) =

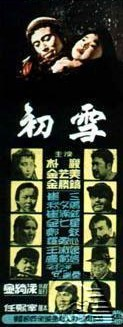
- Korean poster for First Snow (1958)
- Hangul: 초설
- Hanja: 初雪
- RR: Choseol
- MR: Ch'osŏl
- Directed by: Kim Ji-mee; Kim Ki-young
- Written by: Lim Hee-jae
- Produced by: Park Won-seok
- Starring: Kim Seung-ho
- Cinematography: Kim Hyeong-geun
- Edited by: Kim Ki-young
- Music by: Han Sang-ki
- Distributed by: Korean Art Movies
- Release date: May 30, 1958
- Country: South Korea
- Language: Korean

First Snow (Korean: 초설) is a 1958 South Korean film directed by Kim Ki-young.

== Plot ==
A melodrama about refugees existing on the black market surrounding the Yongsan U.S. army base after the Korean War.

== Cast ==
- Kim Ji-mee
- Kim Seung-ho
- Park Am
- Choi Sam
- Choi Nam-hyun
- Na Ae-sim
- Ahn Sung-ki

== Bibliography ==
- Berry, Chris. "The First Snow". The House of Kim Ki-young. Archived from the original on 2004-05-09.
- "The Korean Film Industry's Giant, Film Director Kim Ki-young". Korean Film Archive.
