= A Woman's War =

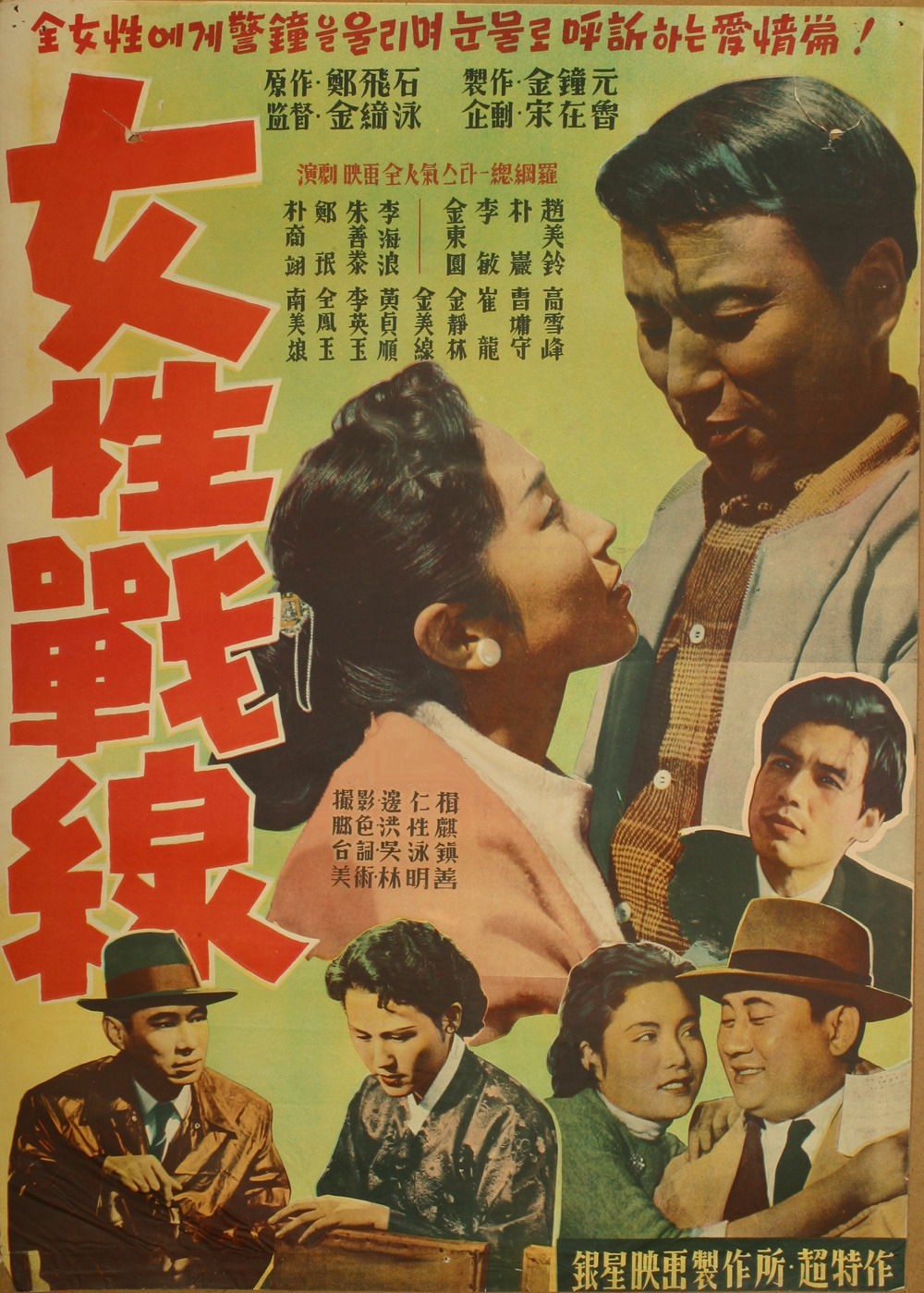
- Korean poster for A Woman's War (1957)
- Hangul: 여성전선
- Hanja: 女性戰線
- RR: Yeoseongjeonseon
- MR: Yŏsŏngjŏnsŏn
- Directed by: Kim Ki-young
- Written by: Hong Seong-ki
- Produced by: Kim Jong-won
- Starring: Jo Mi-ryeong; Park Am
- Cinematography: Byeon In-jib
- Edited by: Kim Ki-young
- Music by: Han Sang-ki
- Distributed by: Eun-seong Films
- Release date: March 1, 1957
- Running time: 125 minutes
- Country: South Korea
- Language: Korean

A Woman's War (Korean: 여성전선) a.k.a. Women at the Front is a 1957 South Korean film directed by Kim Ki-young.

== Synopsis ==
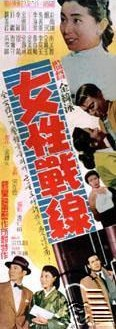
A Woman's War (1957)

A melodrama about a housemaid who bears her employer's illegitimate daughter. The daughter visits her father on his deathbed, unable to tell him she is his daughter.

== Cast ==
- Jo Mi-ryeong
- Park Am
- Lee Min
- Kim Dong-won
- Lee Hae-rang
- Joo Sun-tae
- Jeong Min
- Park Sang-ik
- Ko Seol-bong
- Choe Ryong

== Bibliography ==
- Berry, Chris. "Women at the Front". asianfilms.org. Archived from the original on 2004-09-08.
- "A Woman's War (Yeoseongjeonseon)(1957)". Korean Movie Database (KMDb).
- Yeoseong jeonseon (1957) at IMDb
