= Piagol =

- Hangul: 피아골
- RR: Piagol
- MR: P'iagol
- Directed by: Lee Kang-cheon
- Written by: Kim Jong-hwan (김종환)
- Produced by: Kim Byeong-ki
- Starring: Kim Jin-kyu; Lee Ye-chun (이예춘)
- Cinematography: Kang Yeong-hwa (강영화)
- Edited by: Yang Ju-nam (양주남)
- Music by: Kwak In-geun (곽인건)
- Release date: September 23, 1955
- Running time: 110 minutes
- Country: South Korea
- Language: Korean

Piagol (Korean: 피아골) is a 1955 South Korean film directed by Lee Kang-cheon. It deals with a North Korean army unit that refuses to accept the armistice that effectively ended the Korean War in 1953. Instead, they hole up around Mt. Jiri and continue to operate. It is based on real historical events. It was initially banned due to its supposedly "pro-communist" content, but the director launched a protest to have the film re-released.

== Cast ==
- Kim Jin-kyu as Cheol-su
- Heo Jang-kang as Man-su
- No Kyeong-hie as Ae-ran
- Lee Ye-chun as Agari, Boss
- Yun Wang-guk
- Kim Yeong-hui as Soju
