= Kim Seok-hun =

South Korean actor (1929–2023)

- 김석훈
- Born: Kim Young-hyun; 8 June 1929; Seoul, Korea
- Died: 28 May 2023 (aged 93); Seoul, South Korea
- Other name: Kim Seok-hoon
- Occupation: Actor

Kim Young-hyun (Korean: 김영현; 8 June 1929 – 28 May 2023), best known as Kim Seok-hun (김석훈), was a South Korean actor.

== Life and career ==
Born in Seoul, at the time a Japanese colony, Young-hyun studied at the Cheongju National University of Education. He made his professional acting debut on stage in 1948.

Young-hyun made his film debut in 1957, in Jae-won Yu 's Unforgettable People ("잊을 수 없는 사람들") and had his breakout in 1960, appearing in Chung Changwha's hit A Sunny Field (햇빛 쏟아지는 벌판). One of the most requested actors of the 1960s, he appeared in over 250 films over his career. He retired in 1993.

Young-hyun died on 28 May 2023, at the age of 93.
