= Yangsan Province =

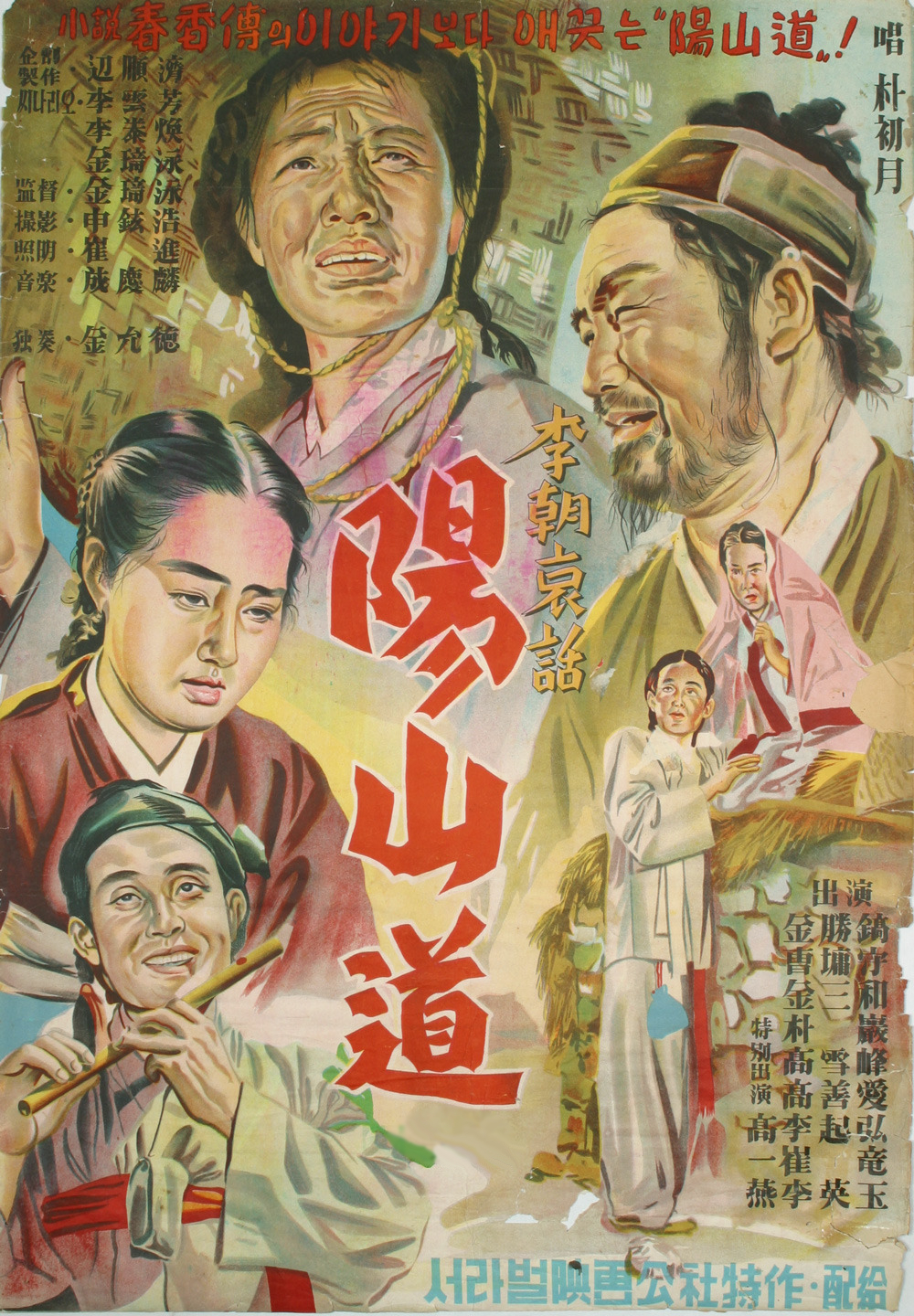
- Korean poster for Yangsan Province (1955)
- Hangul: 양산도
- Hanja: 陽山道
- RR: Yangsan-do
- MR: Yangsan-do
- Directed by: Kim Ki-young
- Written by: Lee Tae-hwan; Kim Ki-young
- Produced by: Byeon Sun-je
- Starring: Kim Sam-hwa; Cho Yong-soo
- Cinematography: Sin Hyeon-ho
- Edited by: Kim Ki-young
- Music by: Seong Gyeong-rin
- Distributed by: Seorabyol Public Films
- Release date: October 13, 1955
- Running time: 90 minutes
- Country: South Korea
- Language: Korean
- Box office: $0

Yangsan Province (Korean: 양산도; RR: Yangsan-do), also known as The Sunlit Path, is a 1955 South Korean film directed by Kim Ki-young.

== Plot ==
The film is a historical melodrama about a high government official who wants to marry a woman who is engaged to marry another man.

== Cast ==
- Kim Sam-hwa as Ok-rang
- Cho Yong-soo as Su-dong
- Kim Seung-ho as Ok-rang's father
- Park Am as Mu-ryeong
- Go Seon-ae as Su-dong's mother
- Ko Seol-bong
- Lee Gi-hong
- Go Il-yeon
- Choe Ryong
- Lee Yeong-ok

== Bibliography ==
- Kim, Sung-Eun. "The Sunlit Path". The House of Kim Ki-young. Archived from the original on 2004-05-06.
- Lee, Yong-Kwan. "The Sunlit Path: Another Side of Kim Ki-young and Mapping the Korean Cinema of the 1950s". The House of Kim Ki-young. Archived from the original on 2004-05-05.
