= Kim Ki-young =

South Korean film director (1919–1998)

- Kim Ki-young in 1997
- Born: October 10, 1919; Keijō, Korea, Empire of Japan
- Died: February 5, 1998 (aged 78); Seoul, South Korea
- Education: Seoul National University
- Occupations: Film director, screenwriter, producer, editor
- Years active: 1955–1990
- Awards: Best Director, Blue Dragon Film Awards (1971); Best Director, Baeksang Arts Awards (1973)

Korean name
- Hangul: 김기영
- Hanja: 金綺泳
- RR: Gim Giyeong
- MR: Kim Kiyŏng

Kim Ki-young (Korean: 김기영; October 10, 1919 – February 5, 1998) was a South Korean film director known for intensely psychosexual, melodramatic, and grotesque films, often centred on female characters. Born in Seoul and raised in Pyongyang, he developed an interest in theatre before moving south after World War II, where he studied dentistry while continuing to work in theatre. During the Korean War, he made propaganda films for the United States Information Service, and in 1955 used discarded equipment to produce his first two features, whose success led him to establish his own production company.

Kim established himself with The Housemaid (1960), now regarded as one of the greatest Korean films. Despite South Korea's heavy censorship and depressed market of the 1970s, Kim produced some of his most significant work, including Insect Woman (1972) and Iodo (1977). His career waned in the 1980s, but he became a cult figure in the early 1990s, and a retrospective at the 1997 Pusan International Film Festival brought renewed attention to his work. He and his wife died in a house fire in 1998 while he was preparing a comeback film. Directors including Im Sang-soo, Bong Joon-ho, and Park Chan-wook have cited Kim as a formative influence.

== Biography ==
=== Early life ===
Kim Ki-young was born in the Gyo-dong neighborhood of Seoul—now part of Gyeongun-dong in Jongno-gu—on October 10, 1922. His family had lived in Seoul for several generations, and his grandfather was a guard at Gwanghwamun. Kim's family was well-educated and artistically inclined. His father, Kim Seok-jin, was an English teacher, and his mother, Han Jin-cho, was also a teacher and a graduate of Gyeonggi Women's College. Both painted as a hobby. The family had two daughters, and Kim Ki-young was their only son. One of his sisters graduated as an art major from Seoul National University, and the other majored in dance at Ewha Womans University. His sisters encouraged the young Kim to develop his own creativity. The family moved to Pyongyang in 1930, where they stayed for the next 10 years. At Pyongyang National High School, Kim showed exceptional talent in music, painting and writing, and his studious nature earned him the nickname "Professor of Physics". While still a student, one of Kim's poems was published in a Japanese newspaper, and he was awarded first prize in a painting competition.

Despite his artistic talents, Kim's main interest was medicine, and he applied for entrance into medical school upon graduation from high school in 1940. When he failed to gain admittance, Kim moved to Japan, planning to study and save up money to reapply for medical school. The theater and cinema grew into lifetime interests at this time. Kim often went to Kyoto, where he attended many stage productions and saw many international films. Josef von Sternberg's Morocco (1930) and Fritz Lang's M (1931) made a particularly strong impression on him, and their influence was to show in his mature film style.

Kim returned to Korea in 1941, initially planning to work as a dentist, but instead immersing himself in the study of drama. At this time he was particularly interested in classical Greek theater, Ibsen and Eugene O'Neill. To avoid conscription by the Japanese into the military, Kim returned to Japan briefly before 1945. He returned to Pyongyang where he studied Stanislavsky's theories of acting and founded a theatrical group called "The Little Orchid". In 1946 Kim enrolled in Seoul Medical School, Seoul National University, and graduated with a major in dentistry in 1950. While attending university, his theatrical activities continued. He founded the National University Theater in 1949, and with this group staged many works of the Western theater, including Ibsen's Ghosts, Čapek's Robots, Shakespeare's The Merchant of Venice, and works by Chekhov and O'Neill. The main actress Kim worked with while at the university was Kim Yu-bong, who would later become his wife.

=== Film career ===
Kim was an intern at Seoul University Medical Clinic when the Korean War broke out. He went to Pusan on June 1, 1951, the day the North Korean army retreated. In Pusan, Kim met Oh Young-jin, a fellow Pyongyang National High School graduate. Oh, who would later write the screenplay to the popular film The Wedding Day (1956), was producing newsreels for the Korean News through the Bureau of Public Information, and helped Kim get a job writing screenplays with this organization. With Oh's help, Kim got a job working for the United States Information Service in Jinhae. The job helped shape Kim's life in several ways. With the increase in pay he received from the U.S.I.S., he was able to marry Kim Yu-bong in 1951, and their first son, Kim Dong-won, was born in 1952. They would have a daughter born in 1955 and a second son, Kim Dong-yang, born in 1958. The two remained married for the rest of their lives. Kim Yu-bong supported her husband's filmmaking career through her dental practice, giving him a unique degree of independence among Korean filmmakers of his era to pursue his own personal visions. At a career retrospective during the last year of his life, Kim commented, "My wife's support has been unflagging over the years, even if, at times, she has seen one of my films and cried 'What have you done with my money?' But at rare moments like this retrospective, she becomes very emotional, recognizing that finally it has all been worthwhile."

Kim filmed about 20 documentaries for the U.S.I.S. with such titles as Diary of the Navy and I Am a Truck for "Liberty News". The latter title was given an award by the U.S. State Department. The training and equipment Kim gained while working on these propaganda newsreels for the U.S.I.S. also enabled him to direct his first commercial film, Box of Death (1955). Kim used expired film stock and a manually operated camera from the U.S.I.S. to make this debut feature, an anti-communist melodrama about war orphans. The film, now lost, showed stylistic influences from the Italian neo-realists and was the first Korean film to employ synchronous sound.

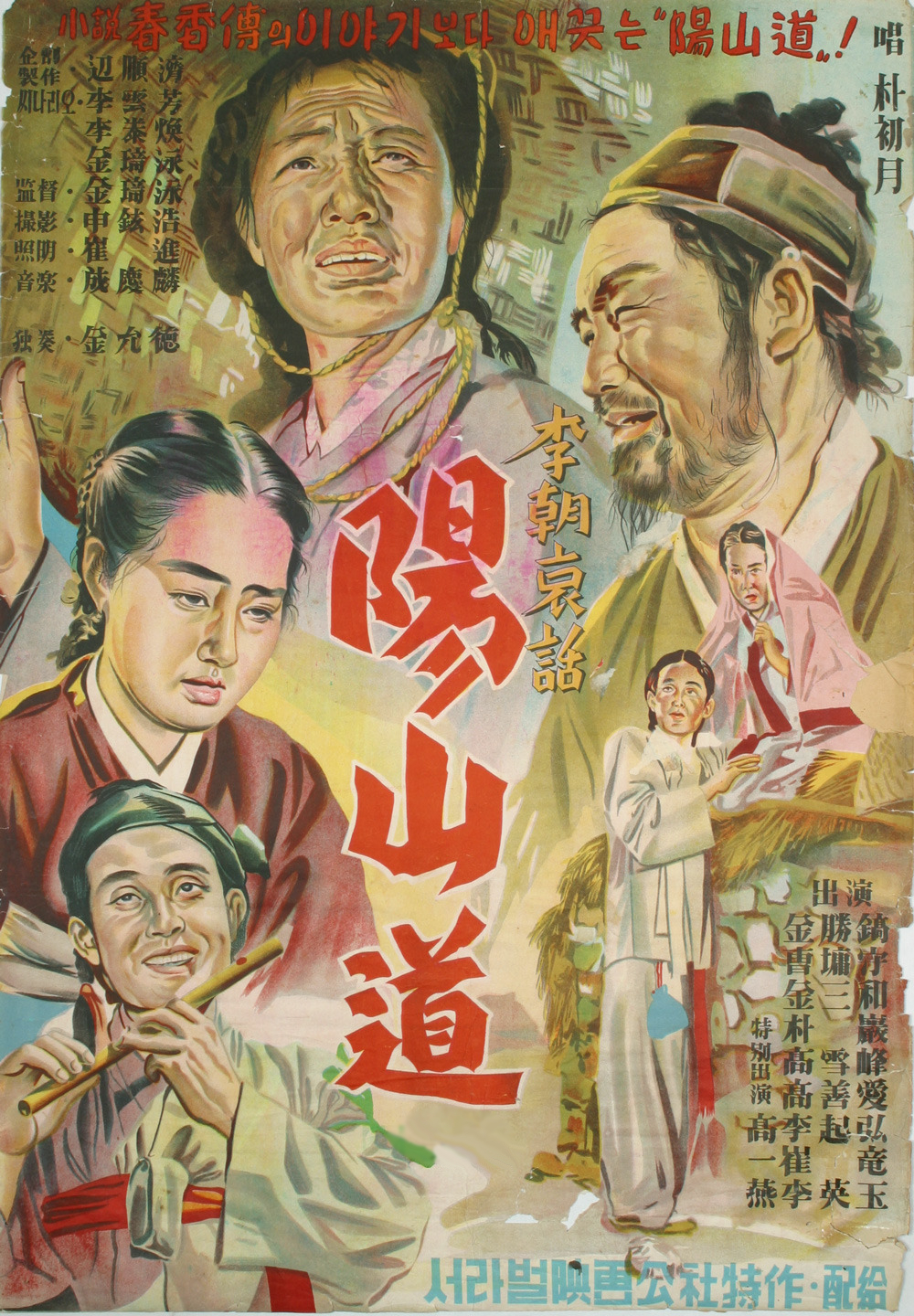
Theatrical poster to Yangsan Province (1955).

With the success of this first film, Kim was able to direct his second feature, the historical costume drama Yangsan Province (also 1955), again using primitive equipment obtained from the U.S.I.S. Although Kim claimed to have based the film on a traditional song he learned from his mother, no exact source for the story has been found. It is suspected that the director made up the story himself, modeling it on traditional stories such as Chunhyangjeon, Lee Kyu-hwan's remake of which had recently become a major success, stimulating a rebirth in Korean cinema. After Lee's Chunhyangjeon, Yangsan Province was the second most successful Korean film of 1955. Though a popular success, critics of the time were not kind to Yangsan Province. Yoo Do-yeon called the film a "work of bad taste," and Heo Baek-nyeon said that it "debases the dignity of Korean cinema." As his only surviving film of the 1950s, Yangsan Province sheds considerable light on Kim Ki-young's early career. In an era in which Korean film critics considered realism to be important, the now-lost ending to Yangsan Province, in which two dead lovers ascend to heaven on a beam of light, was harshly criticized. In light of Kim's later career, critics today believe that this cut scene displays some of the most recognizable characteristics of Kim's mature style such as an interest in the fantastic, and a jarring blending of genres. Other motifs that were to be explored in depth in Kim's later work can also be found in Yangsan Province, such as animal imagery, particularly the use of hens as a representation of fertility and sexuality.

In 1956 Kim started Kim Ki-young Productions, and began making melodramas, the most popular film genre in South Korea at the time. His first independent production was Touch-Me-Not (1956). In 1957, Kim was living near the red-light district of Yongsan, and the atmosphere of this neighborhood influenced his films, A Woman's War and Twilight Train (both 1957). With First Snow (1958), Kim moved from melodrama to a more socially conscious realism. Defiance of a Teenager (1959) and Sad Pastorale (1960) followed in this style. Defiance of a Teenager was one of Kim's most successful and respected early works, and he attended the San Francisco International Film Festival in 1960 for a showing of this film.

=== The Housemaid ===
1960 was a critical year for South Korea, marking the end of the rule of Syngman Rhee through the civilian April Revolution. In 1962, another military authoritarian, General Park Chung-Hee, would ascend to power and rule South Korea for nearly two decades. The short period of relative freedom between these two administrations was known as the Second Republic. During this time, filmmakers took advantage of the relaxation of governmental control over the film industry to create several boldly experimental works. Director Yu Hyun-mok's film Aimless Bullet (1960) dates from this period, as does Kim Ki-young's major breakthrough, The Housemaid (also 1960). A lurid, expressionistic melodrama set in an eerie house, involving sexual obsessions, murder and rats, this is the first film in which Kim's mature style is fully evident, and is widely regarded as one of the greatest Korean films ever made.

The film is a domestic thriller telling of a family's destruction by the introduction of a sexually predatory femme fatale into the household. A composer has just moved into a two-storey house with his wife and two children. When his wife becomes exhausted from working at a sewing machine to support the family, the composer hires a housemaid to help with the work around the house. The new housemaid behaves strangely, catching rats with her hands, spying on the composer, seducing him and eventually becoming pregnant by him. The composer's wife convinces the housemaid to induce a miscarriage by falling down a flight of stairs. After this incident, the housemaid's behavior becomes increasingly more erratic. She kills the composer's son, and then persuades the composer to commit suicide with her by swallowing rat poison. The film ends with the composer reading the story from a newspaper with his wife. The narrative of the film has apparently been told by the composer, who then warns the film audience that this is just the sort of thing could happen to anyone.

The Housemaid marked Kim's full break with realism, the main style of Korean cinema at the time, into his own version of expressionism. The plot, themes and even character names set out in The Housemaid were to be revisited by Kim repeatedly in his later career. Besides the first film, the official "Housemaid Trilogy" consists of Woman of Fire (1971) and Woman of Fire '82 (1982). Also, at least two other later films—Insect Woman (1972) and Beasts of Prey (1985)—are, in some ways, remakes of The Housemaid. By using the story as a template, Kim was able to emphasize different aspects of the scenario, and to concentrate on different details and aspects of the central situation with each new re-telling.

=== Mid-career ===
Kim solidified his break with cinematic realism by following The Housemaid with two more films exploring styles and mixing genres, radically new for Korean cinema at the time. The Sea Knows (1961) transcended its roots in the standard anti-Japanese World War II film to become a distinctive examination of humanity, sadism, greed, lust for power and sexuality. The box-office success of this film enabled Kim to buy his first house, in the Namsan district of Seoul. Goryeojang (1963), dealt with a similar subject matter as The Ballad of Narayama (1983), directed by Shohei Imamura, a filmmaker with whom Kim has often been compared. Kim's version of the story is marked by his mixing of genres. For example, he frames the story—which deals with an ancient tradition in which elders were abandoned to die—within a modern lecture on birth control.

Some of the characteristic traits of Kim's mature style, first seen in these three films, are gothic excess, surrealism, horror, perversions and sexuality. Although in stark contrast to the realism, harmony, balance and sentimentality typical of Korean cinema of the time, Kim's films, in an eccentric and metaphorical way, deal with the realities of postwar, industrializing South Korean society and psychology. After having firmly established his auteur status with these films, Kim's unique vision began to wane in his films of the later 1960s.

During the 1970s, South Korea's film industry was at a low point due to government censorship and underfunding. Because of the poor state of the local film industry, cinema attendance in South Korea had dropped drastically since its high-point in the 1960s. Kim Ki-young, however, working independently in B-movie-like genre films, began to produce some of his most innovative and personal works at this time. Kim fully regained his auteurist spirit with Woman of Fire (1971), the second of his Housemaid trilogy. The use of color, particularly reds and blues to express the anxiety and desires of the film's characters, distinguished this film from the original Housemaid's dark, shadowy black-and-white photography. For this film, Kim was named Best Director at the Blue Dragon Film Awards and actress Youn Yuh-jung was given Special Mention for Best Actress at the Festival de Cine de Sitges. Not only popular with the critics, Kim's independently produced films were box-office successes during this era in which most films were harmed through heavy governmental interference. In 1972 Kim's Insect Woman was the only film to sell more than 100,000 tickets in Seoul and won Kim the Best Director prize at the Baeksang Arts Awards in 1973.

"I'm a scientist specializing in medicine. That makes me close to a technician... In some ways, human beings are more accurate than machines. Of course, that depends on their expertise. As an independent producer, I have to be a type of skilled laborer. There were many times that I had to make a film quickly. At those times, I kept entertainment-value in mind. Not once have I made a film for the sake of making the film itself. My taste is in looking through the camera. Filming happens to correspond with that taste. Art films are what Yu Hyun-mok makes. That's because director Yu wants to make art films. I just make films by following my heart, so the analysis I leave to all of you."— Kim Ki-young

Although a critically acclaimed, financially successful independent filmmaker, Kim was not immune from governmental pressure. He filmed Ban Geum-ryeon in 1975, but it was banned at the time, and not released until 1981, with 40 minutes of footage censored. The government also coerced Kim into making an anti-Communist propaganda film. The resulting film, Love of Blood Relations (1976), transcended the bounds of propaganda by portraying the communist agent as one of Kim's typical femme fatale characters. Kim later commented, "North or south, capitalist or communist, ideology is far less interesting to me than the things that divide the sexes."

Film professor and programmer for the Pusan International Film Festival, Lee Yong-kwan calls Iodo (1977) Kim's best film, and Variety's Seoul-correspondent Darcy Paquet calls it "one of Korean cinema's most compelling, unnerving depictions of the primal forces that motivate humankind." An examination of environmental, religious, social and sexual taboos, the film culminates in a scene of necrophilia that Paquet calls "one of the most shocking, brazen sequences ever shot by a Korean filmmaker".

=== Rediscovery and later life ===
Kim's associates characterize the director as an eccentric individual. Tokyo International Film Festival programming director Kenji Ishizaka recalls that Kim's way of writing a screenplay was to walk away from home for three months. He would shut himself up in a cheap hotel, listen to neighborhood gossip, and write all night in the dark. South Korean film critic Lee Young-il remembers that Kim's shoes were never shined, and that one of his few material pleasures was gourmet coffee. Kim Ki-young's unconventional and nonconformist nature also prevented him from participating in South Korea's mainstream film industry. The only official title he held within the film community was member of The National Academy of Arts, which he joined in 1997, and he did not cultivate friendships with journalists who could further his career.

Nevertheless, since the early 1960s, Kim Ki-young's status as one of the greatest and most original Korean film directors had never been in doubt. His stylistic preoccupation with sexuality, horror and melodrama had earned Kim the nickname, "Mister Monster" from his admirers. However, by the 1980s Kim's career had fallen into neglect. His continued fascination with B-movie exploitation themes as well as the increasingly obsessive and subversive nature of his films resulted in his isolation from the film community, and in financial failures at the box-office. The last of the Housemaid trilogy, Woman of Fire '82 (1982) is an even more radicalized and baroque retelling of the same basic story he had filmed numerous times in the previous two decades. By the mid-1980s, Kim's film output had slowed and finally stopped.

In the early 1990s Kim's work began to be rediscovered by South Korean cult film fans who discussed his films through the Internet and exchanged hard-to-find copies by videotape. Noticing this growing domestic Kim Ki-young cult, the Dongsung Cinematheque, an art-house theater in Seoul, programmed a retrospective showing of Kim's films. With his profile again high in Korean film society, Kim's work began to attract international attention. Five of his films were screened at the Tokyo International Film Festival in 1996. When Kim Ki-young's career was highlighted at the second Pusan International Film Festival in 1997, his work found enthusiastic new audiences in the international film community. The strongly positive reception of Kim's work by international audiences surprised the festival organizers, who immediately began receiving requests for overseas retrospectives of Kim's career. With this renewed interest, Kim began work on a comeback film to be titled Diabolical Woman. The Berlin International Film Festival invited him to attend a showing of his films in 1998. Before Kim started work on the film or attended the festival, he and his wife were killed in a house fire caused by an electrical short circuit on February 5, 1998.

Kim Ki-young's death did not stop the revival of interest in his films. A six-film retrospective of Kim's career was shown in San Francisco twice in 1998. Within the year, Kim's films were screened at the Belgrade International Film Festival, the London Pan-Asian Film Festival, the Estate Romana and the Paris Videothèque. Few prints of Korean films before the 1970s survive, and at one point 90% of Kim's output was considered lost. Under the "Kim Ki-young Renaissance Project", the Korean Film Council (KOFIC) has worked to find Kim's lost films and to restore those that are damaged. In 2006, the French Cinémathèque presented 18 of Kim's films, many of them newly rediscovered and restored through the efforts of the KOFIC.

The Cine Library at Myeong‑dong Station, which operated the Kim Ki‑young Hall, opened in 2018 and closed on 29 February 2026. CGV Art House stated that “the exhibited materials and display items related to the late director Kim Ki‑young were organized and then delivered to his family after the closure.”

During his lifetime, Kim gained many supporters among the younger generation of South Korean directors. Park Kwang-su reportedly admires Kim Ki-young above all other directors, and Lee Chang-ho is another of Kim's followers. In the years since his death, Kim's influence on Korean cinema has continued to be seen through the work of the current generation of South Korean filmmakers, including such prominent directors as Im Sang-soo and Kim Ki-duk. Bong Joon-ho calls Kim his mentor and favorite director. Park Chan-wook names The Housemaid as one of the films which most influenced his career, and says of Kim Ki-young, "He is able to find and portray beauty in destruction, humor in violence and terror."

== Filmography ==
Film title	Cast	Notes	Release date
I Am a Truck		Documentary short	1953
Ward of Affection		Documentary short	1953
Diary of Three Sailors		Documentary short	1955
Box of Death	Choi Moo-ryong; Kang Hyo-shil	Anti-Communist melodrama Kim's commercial debut	June 11, 1955
Yangsan Province	Kim Sam-hwa; Cho Yong-soo	Historical melodrama Kim's only surviving pre-1960 film	October 13, 1955
Touch-Me-Not	Na Gang-hui; An Seok-jin	Historical melodrama Kim Ki-young Production's first film	November 10, 1956
A Woman's War	Jo Mi-ryeong; Park Am	Melodrama	March 1, 1957
Twilight Train	Jo Mi-ryeong; Park Am	Melodrama	October 31, 1957
First Snow	Kim Ji-mee; Kim Seung-ho	Melodrama	May 30, 1958
Defiance of a Teenager	Hwang Hae-nam; Um Aing-ran	Melodrama	July 16, 1958
Sad Pastorale	Kim Seok-hun; Kim Ui-hyang	Melodrama	March 24, 1960
The Housemaid	Lee Eun-shim; Ju Jeung-ryu	Considered one of the greatest Korean films	November 3, 1960
The Sea Knows	Kim Wun-ha; Gong Midori	Wartime melodrama	November 10, 1961
Goryeojang	Kim Jin-kyu; Ju Jeung-ryu		March 5, 1963
Asphalt	Kim Jin-kyu; Jang Dong-he	Crime melodrama	April 10, 1964
A Soldier Speaks after Death	Hwang Jung-seun; Sunwoo Yong-nyeo	War drama	January 22, 1966
Woman	Shin Seong-il; Moon Hee	Melodrama	December 23, 1968
Lady Hong	Lee Soon-jae; Moon Hee	Supernatural horror film	August 8, 1969
Elegy of Ren	Lee Soon-jae; Moon Hee	Romantic literary drama	October 16, 1969
Woman of Fire	Namkoong Won; Youn Yuh-jung	Second in the Housemaid trilogy Best Director: Blue Dragon Film Awards; Special Mention Best Actress: Festival de Cine de Sitges	April 1, 1971
Insect Woman	Youn Yuh-jung; Jeon Gye-hyeon	Best Director, Best Actor: Baeksang Arts Awards	July 6, 1972
Transgression	Choi Bool-am; Park Byeong-ho	Literary adaptation	November 9, 1974
Promise of the Flesh	Kim Ji-mee; Lee Jung-gil	Melodrama	July 26, 1975
Love of Blood Relations	Kim Ji-mee; Lee Jung-gil	Anti-Communist melodrama	October 5, 1976
Iodo	Lee Hwa-si; Kim Chung-chul	Literary adaptation with supernatural and environmental themes	October 4, 1977
Peasants	Lee Hwa-si; Kim Chung-chul	Literary melodrama	March 25, 1978
Killer Butterfly	Namkoong Won; Kim Ja-ok	Science-fiction/horror melodrama	December 2, 1978
Water Lady	Kim Ja-ok; Lee Hwa-si	Literary adaptation	April 21, 1979
Neumi	Chang Mi-hee; Hah Myung-joong	Melodrama about a mute woman	June 13, 1980
Ban Geum-ryeon	Lee Hwa-si; Shin Seong-il	Directed in 1975, banned and released censored in 1981	March 13, 1981
Woman of Fire '82	Kim Ji-mee; Na Young-hee	Last of the Housemaid trilogy	June 26, 1982
Free Woman	Ahn So-young; Shin Seong-il	Melodrama	October 29, 1982
Hunting of Fools	Eom Sim-jeong; Kim Seong-geun	Melodrama	December 1, 1984
Beasts of Prey	Kim Sung-kyom; No Gyeong-sin	Social melodrama, remake of "Insect Woman"	March 23, 1985
Be a Wicked Woman	Youn Yuh-jung; Hyun Kil-soo	Melodrama about two women who plot to kill each other's husbands	September 28, 1990; July 21, 1995

== See also ==
- List of Korean film directors
- Cinema of Korea

== Bibliography ==
- Heo, Ji-ung (February 17, 2006). "김기영의 마술적 리얼리즘을 회상하다 (Recollection on the magic realism of Kim Ki-young)" (in Korean). Dong-a nuri / Film.2.0. Archived from the original on February 26, 2008.
- "The House of Kim Ki-young". Archived from the original on March 27, 2004. – an extensive page of critical writings
- Ki-young Kim at IMDb
- Kim, Hong-joon, ed. (2007). Korean Film Directors: Kim Ki-young (in English and Korean). Seoul: Seoul Selection.
- Kim, Young-jin; Kwon Yong-min; Park Ji-yeon; Lee Sang-yong. "An Interview (with Kim Ki-young) to Mark the Pusan Retrospective". The House of Kim Ki-young. Archived from the original on May 8, 2004.
- Lee, Youn-Yi. "Biography (Kim Ki-young), Part 1". The House of Kim Ki-young. Archived from the original on May 5, 2004.
- Lee, Youn-Yi. "Biography (Kim Ki-young), Part 2". The House of Kim Ki-young. Archived from the original on May 9, 2004.
- Stephens, Chuck (June 10, 1998). "Meet Mr. Monster: A peek inside the cine-crypt of Kim Ki-young". San Francisco Bay Guardian. Archived from the original on August 2, 2002.
