= Twilight Train =

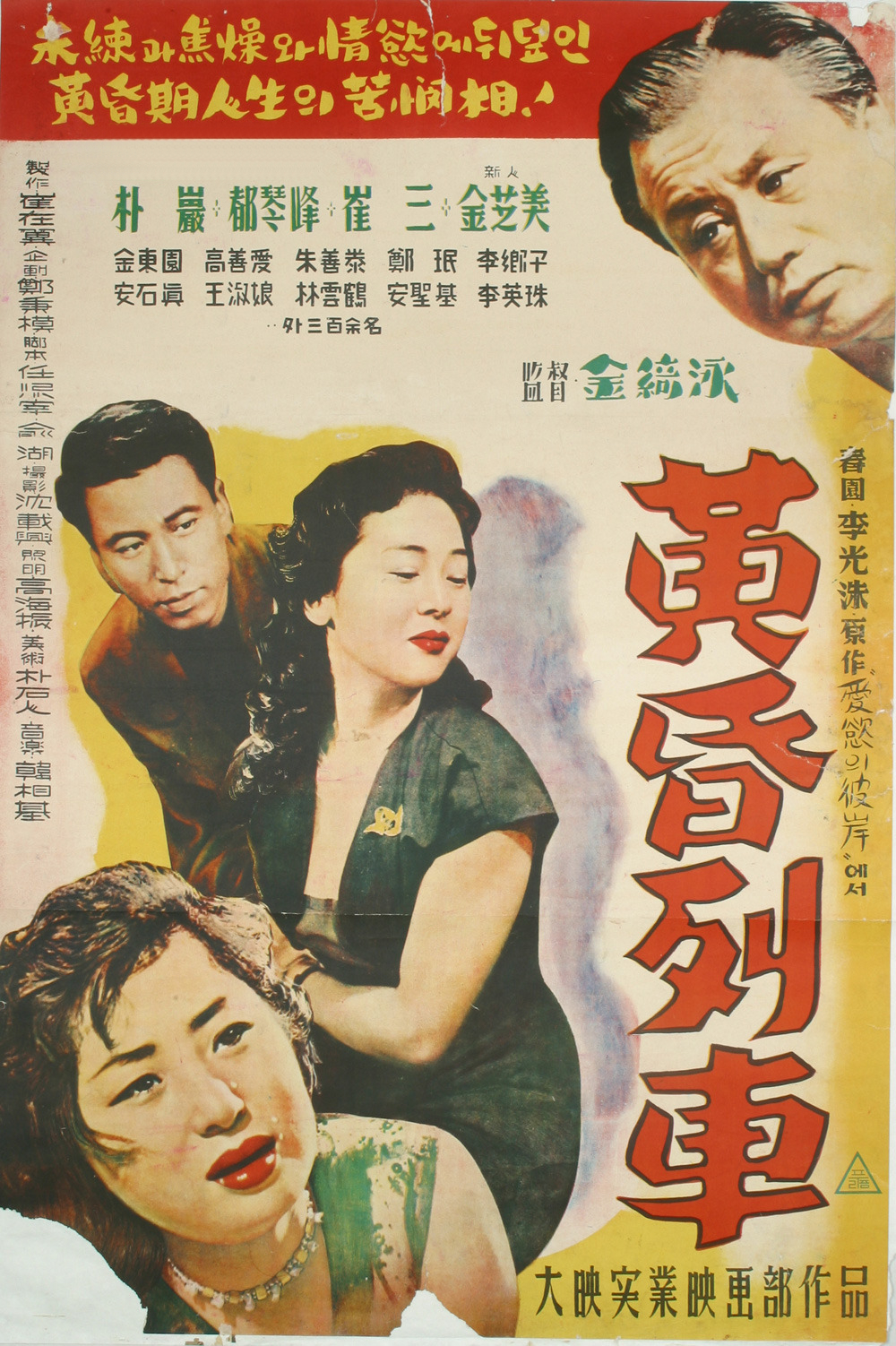
- Korean poster for Twilight Train (1957)
- Hangul: 황혼열차
- Hanja: 黃昏列車
- RR: Hwanghonyeolcha
- MR: Hwanghonyŏlch'a
- Directed by: Kim Ki-young
- Written by: Im Hee-jae; Lee Kwang-su
- Produced by: Choe Jae-ik
- Starring: Park Am; Do Kum-bong; Choi Sam
- Cinematography: Sim Jae-heung
- Edited by: Kim Ki-young
- Music by: Han Sang-ki
- Distributed by: Dong-kwang Films
- Release date: October 31, 1957
- Running time: 120 minutes
- Country: South Korea
- Language: Korean

Twilight Train (Korean: 황혼열차) is a 1957 South Korean romantic drama film directed by Kim Ki-young. It was the debut film for actors Ahn Sung-ki and Kim Ji-mee.

== Synopsis ==
Kim Ji-mee plays the daughter of Choi Sam, president of the orphanage. Kim Ji-mee is in love with Park Am, who is vice-president of the orphanage. However, both Choi Sam and Park Am are in love with Do Kum-bong, a dancer who came from the orphanage. The two men fight to try to win her love.

== Cast ==
- Park Am
- Do Kum-bong
- Choi Sam
- Kim Ji-mee
- Ahn Sung-ki
