= Even the Clouds Are Drifting =

1959 South Korean film

- Film poster
- Hangul: 구름은 흘러가도
- RR: Gureumeun heulleogado
- MR: Kurŭmŭn hŭllŏgado
- Directed by: Yu Hyun-mok
- Written by: Ahn So-im
- Produced by: Yu Hie-dae
- Starring: Kim Young-ok
- Cinematography: Kim Hyung-keun
- Edited by: Ree Kyoung-ja
- Music by: Han Sang-gi
- Production company: Yu Han Films Co.
- Release date: 5 November 1959
- Running time: 100 minutes
- Country: South Korea
- Language: Korean

Even the Clouds Are Drifting (Korean: 구름은 흘러가도; RR: Gureumeun heulleogado) is a 1959 South Korean drama film directed by Yu Hyun-mok. It was entered into the 10th Berlin International Film Festival.

== Cast ==
- Kim Young-ok
- Um Aing-ran
- Park Sung-dae
- Do Kum-bong
- Choi Moo-ryong
