= Um Aing-ran =

South Korean actress (born 1936)

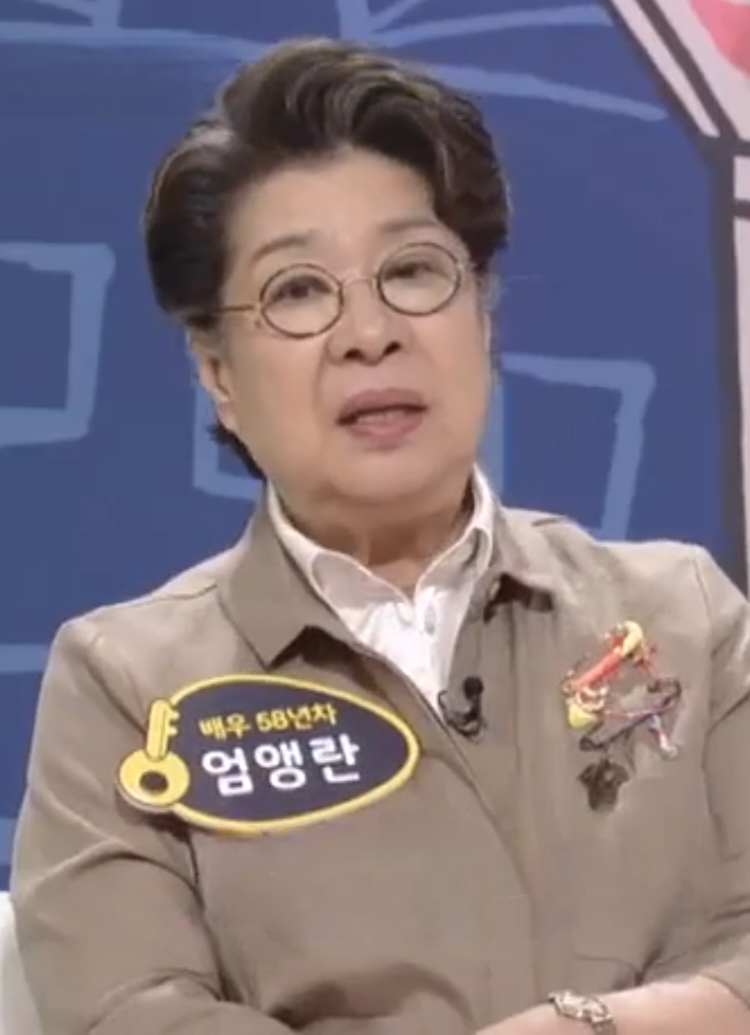
- Um in July 2013
- Born: Eom In-gi; March 20, 1936 (age 90); Seoul, South Korea
- Education: Sookmyung Women's University
- Occupation: Actress
- Spouse: Shin Seong-il (m. 1964)
- Children: 3

Korean name
- Hangul: 엄인기
- RR: Eom Ingi
- MR: Ŏm In'gi

Stage name
- Hangul: 엄앵란
- RR: Eom Aengran
- MR: Ŏm Aengnan

Um Aing-ran (Korean: 엄앵란; born March 20, 1936) is a South Korean actress. She has starred in about 190 films, and gained a popularity with the image of "a cheerful female college student" in the 1960s. Her marriage with Shin Seong-il, a colleague actor and big star of the time, attracted national attention. Since then she had been retired from the film industry, but returned as a TV show guest and host in the 1990s. The couple have three children.

== Early life and education ==
Um was born in Seoul to a father who was a saxophonist and her mother, No Jae-shin, who was a prominent stage and film actress. She attended Sookmyung Women's University, where she studied English Literature.

== Career ==
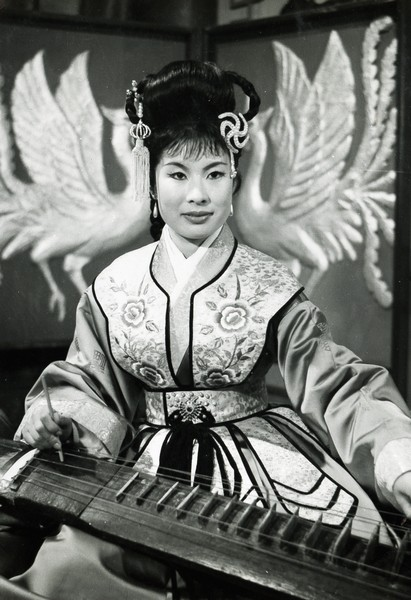
Um playing the geomungo in the 1962 film Prince Hodong

Um made her film debut in 1956 in The Tragedy of King Dan Jong, directed by Jeon Chang-keun. She gained significant critical attention for her supporting role in Kim Ki-young's 1960 film, The Housemaid.

By the early 1960s, she had become a household name, starring in family dramas and romantic comedies such as A Romantic Papa (1960) and A Coachman (1961). Her career reached its peak with the 1964 hit The Barefooted Young, which solidified her status as the era's leading "youth star."

Following her marriage in 1964, she largely retired from acting, but she successfully re-emerged in the 1990s as a popular television personality and talk show host.

== Filmography ==
*Note; the whole list is referenced.

Year	English title	Korean title	Romanization	Role	Director
1999	Cotton				
	A Pair		Jjag		
	Testimony		Jeung-eon		
	Sigeodeun Tetoljina Malji		Sigeodeun tteolbjina malji		
	New Year's Soup		Tteoggug		
	Woman in the Deluxe Suite		Teughosil yeojasonnim		
	Taming of the Shrewd		Cheonha-ilsaeg malgwallyang-i		
	What's Parents?		Tteona-yahal salam-eun		
	Remorse		Hoesim		
	Madame Anemone		Anemone Madam		
	Myeongdong Hussy		Myeongdong-walgadag		
	Yu Gwan-sun		Yu Gwan-sun		
	Chastity for Men, Bravery for Women		Namjaneun Jeolgae, Yeojaneun Baejjang		
	War and a Female Teacher		Jeonjaenggwa Yeogyosa		
	Horse-year Bride		Maltti Sinbu		
	An Angel without a House		Jib-eopneun Cheonsa		
	A Night of Yeongdeungpo		Yeongdeungpoui Bam		
	The Sun Rises Again		Taeyangeun Dasi Tteunda		
	Miss Bo-kyeong		Bo-kyeong Agassi		
	Mother		Chinjeong Eomeoni		
	Divorce Clinic		Ihonsangdamso		
1967	The Life of Na Woon-gyu		Naungyu Ilsaeng		
	Forbidden Lips		Geumjidoen Ibsul		
	A Seoul Boy		Seoul meoseuma		
	A Grand Escape		Daetalchul		
	The First Love		cheossarang		
	Unexpected Love		Yegichi Mothan Sarang		
	Never Regret		Huhoehaji Angetda		
	Let Me Rest under the Blue Starlight		Pureunbyeol-arae Jamdeulge Hara		
	The Legal Wife		Keundaek		
	Hot Wind		Yeolpung		
	When a Woman Goes Over the Hill		Yeojaga Gogaereul Neom-eulttae		
	The Beautiful Eyes		Areumdaun Nundongja		
	The Heir		Sangsokja		
	Love is Terrible		Sarang-eun Museo-wo		
	The Shadow of the Sun		Taeyang-ui Geurimja		
	The Last Passion		Majimak Jeong-yeol		
	The Great Sokgulam Cave Temple		Dae Seoggul-am		
	The Field Glow with the Setting Sun		No-euljin Deullyeok		
	Fading in the Rain		Bissok-e Jida		
	Bad Girl Jang-mi		Bullyang Sonyeo Jang-mi		
	The North and South		Namgwa Buk		
	The Life in the Red Figures		Jeokjainsaeng		
	My Innocent Lady		Punnaegi Ae-in		
	The Camellia Girl		Dongbaek-agassi		
	The Secret Service Agent in the Continent		Daeryugui Milsa		
	The Student Couple		Haksaeng Bubu		
	The Regular Customers		Dangol Sonnim		
	The Pickled Radishes		Chonggak Gimchi		
	My Mind Is Like a Lake		Naemaeum-eun Hosu		
	Keep Silent When Leaving		Tteonal Ddaeneun Mareopossi		
1964	Barefooted Youth		Maenbal-ui Cheongchun		
	Are You Really a Beauty?		Niga Jalna Ilsaeg-inya		
	The Gentleman of Jin-gogae		Jin-gogae Sinsa		
	Don't Sing, Water Bird		Uljimara Mulsae-ya		
	Mom Is the Best		Uri-eomma Choego		
	The Completion of Love		Yeonae Joleobban		
	The Girl Is Nineteen		Yeoja Sipguse		
	The Chaste Woman Arang		Arang-ui Jeongjo		
	My Dear		Bogosipeun Eolgul		
	Betrayal		Baesin		
	The Thirsty Trees		Mokmareun Namudeul		
	The Woman of Myeongdong		Myeongdong-ajumma		
	The Lost Sun		Ireobeorin Taeyang		
	The Beautiful Maid		Ippeuni		
	Let's Walk As Looking Up		Wireul Bogo Geotja		
	The Lovebirds Boat		Wonangseon		
	The Headwoman of Pal Tong and Pal Ban		Paltong Palban Yeobanjang		
	The Peacock Lady		Gongjakbu-in		
	The Younger Brother-in-law		Sidongsaeng		
	The Apron		Haengjuchima		
	Run with Bare Feet		Maenballo Ttwi-eola		
	I Don't Want to Be Forgiven		Yongseobadgi Silta		
	The Daughter's Medal		Ttal-ui Hunjang		
	Please Bury me Deeply		Nareul Gipi Mudeojuo		
	The Bacheolor Pub		Haksa Jujeom		
	The Three-forked Crossing of Cheon-an		Cheon-an Samgeori		
	Women of Spirit		Maltti Yeodaesaeng		
	The Ridge of Youth		Cheongchun Sanmaek		
	Miss Kim's Double Life		Miss Kim-ui Ijungsaenghwal		
	Eagle Five		O-in-ui Doksuri		
	The Eight Swordsmen		Palgeomgaek		
1963	Daughters of Pharmacist Kim		Gimyakguk-ui Ttaldeul		
	Monyeo Ridge Where The Flute Is Played		Pilibuldeon Monyeo Gogae		
	My Old Jealous Wife		Gangjjasodong		
	Hope		Gaseume kkumeun gadeukhi		
	Private Tutor		Gajeonggyosa		
	Bye Dad		Appa-annyeong		
	The Phone Call at Night		Bame Geollyeoon Jeonhwa		
	Black Gloves		Geomeun Janggab		
1963	Blood Relation		Hyeolmaek		
	The Classroom of Youth		Cheongchun Gyosil		
	The Wandering Troupe		Yurang Geugjang		
	Angry Cosmos		Seongnan Coseumoseu		
	The Stepmother		Sae-eomma		
	The Man's Tears		Sanaiui Nunmul		
	Lover of the Earth		Geu Ttang-ui Yeonin		
	Rulers of the Land		Daeji-ui Jibaeja		
	Love is to Give		Sarang-eun Juneungeot		
	The Night of Shanghai		Sanghae-ui Bam		
	The Mistress		Jageun-daek		
	00:15 Train from Daejeon		Daejeonbal Yeongsi Osibbun		
	Romantic Family		Romance Gajok		
	Prince Hodong		Wangja Hodong		
	New Wife		Saedaek		
	12 Fighters		Sibi-inui Yado		
	A New Recruit, Mr. Lee		Sinibsawon Mr. Lee		
	Great Challenge		Dae-dojeon		
	Man in Yellow Shirt		Noran Syasseu-ibeun Sanai		
	A Woman Judge		Yeopansa		
	Only for You		Akkimeobsi Juryeonda		
1962	The Story of Jang-hwa and Hong-ryeon		Dae Jang-hwa Hong-ryeonjeon		
	Times of Love and Hatred		Sarang-gwa Mi-um-ui Sewol		
	Between the Sky and the Earth		Haneulgwa Ttangsa-i-e		
	The Seven Princesses		Chilgongju		
	The Best Bride and a Plain Young Man		Teukdeungsinbu-wa Samdeung Sillang		
	Unforgettable Love		Ijeul Su Eomneun Aejeong		
	A Boat That Belongs to No One		Imja-eomneun Narutbae		
	Teacher Waryong's Trip to Seoul		Waryong Seonsaeng Sang-gyeong-gi		
	A Log Bridge		Oenamudari		
	Women Rule		Yeoin Cheonha		
	There Is No Bad Man		Agineun Eopda		
	Fighting Lions		Ssa-uneun Sajadeul		
	Sorrow Is Mine		Seulpeumeun Naegeman		
	Farewell Tumen River		Dumangang-a Jal Itgeora		
	A Man from Tokyo		Donggyeongseo On Sanai		
	Eight Hours of Horror		Gongpo-ui Yeodeolsigan		
	Bravo, Young Ones!		Burabo Cheongchun		
	Love Match		Sarang-ui Seungbu		
	The Iron-eating Monster		Bulgasari		
	A Salaryman		Wolgeubjaeng-i		
	Tell Me, Earth!		Daeji-yeo Malhaedao		
	Daughter's Secret		Ttal-ui Bimil		
	Ignorant but Now Rich		Chon Obogi		
	A Tragedy of Korea		Hangugui Bigeuk		
	How to Become Man and Wife		Bubudokbon		
	Horizon		Jipyeongseon		
	Lim Kkeok-jeong		Lim Kkeok-jeong		
	Lives of A, B, and C		Insaeng Gabeul-byeong		
	No Sorrow		Seulpeumeun Eopda		
	My Father Was on a Death Row		Sahyeongsu-ui Ttal		
	River Runs Only in Night		Bameman Heureuneun Gang		
	Talk to the Wind		Mai-dongpung		
	A Coachman		Mabu		
	Don't Touch Me		Naemom-e Son-eul Daeji Mara		
	A Bonanza		Nodaji		
	When Love Knocks		Sarang-i Muneul Dudeurilttae		
	My Father		Abeoji		
	My Sister Is a Hussy		Eonni-neun Malgwallyang-i		
1961	A Wanted Man		Hyeonsangbuteun Sanai		Muk Kim
	A Sunflower Family		Haebaragi Gajok		
	When Love is Flowering and Fading		Sarang-i pigojideon nal		
	A Beloved Face		Geuli-un geu eolgul		
	A Young Look		Jeolm-eun pyojeong		
	A Rainbow		Mujigae		
	Mr. Park		Parkseobang		
	A Daughter		Ttal		
	A Bloody Fight		Pimud-eun daegyeol		
	I Will Forget the Name		Geu ireum-eul ij-euri		
	The Returned Man		Dol-a-on sana-i		
1960	The Housemaid		Hanyeo		
	A Drifting Story		Pyoludo		
	Have I Come to Cry?		Ullyeogo naega wassdeonga		
	A Romantic Papa		Lomaenseuppappa		
1959	Defiance of a Teenager		Sipdaeui Banhang		
	Independence Association and young Lee Seung-Man		Dongniphyeophoewa Cheongnyeon Lee Seung-man		
	Dreaming Again		Kkumiyeo Dasi Hanbeon		
1959	Even the Clouds Are Drifting		Gureumeun Heulleodo		
	Sorrow of Twilight		Hwanghonui Aesang		
	I and a Star		Byeolhana Nahana		
	An Inn		Yeoinsuk		
	A Vanished Dream		Kkumeun Sarajigo		
	Streets of the Sun		Taeyangui Geori		
	Camellia		Dongbaegkkkot		
	Dongsimcho		Dongsimcho		
	Early Spring		Jochun		
	Chun-Hui		Chunhui		
	A Grief		Aesu		
	The River of Temptation		Yuhog-ui gang		
	Affection		Simjeong		
	Kong-Jwi and Pat-Jwi		KongjwiPatjwi		
	The Snow Falling Night		Nunnalineun bam		
	The Elegy		Seungbangbigog		
	The Secret		Byeolman-i aneun bimil		
	A Lady of Destiny		Unmyeong-ui yeo-in		
	The Red and Blue Thread		Cheongsilhongsil		
	The Night of Truth		Jinli-ui bam		
	The Lasting Regret		Cheonchu-ui han		
	The Tragedy of King Dan Jong		Danjong-aesa		
	The Tragic Prince		Sadoseja		

=== Planner ===
Year	English title	Korean title	Romanization	Role	Director
	Beyond the Mountain		Sansan-i buseojin ileum-i-yeo		
	Teenage Love Song		Yeol-ahob jeolmangkkeut-e buleuneun hana-ui salangnolae		
	Man Market		Namjasijang		
	The Woman Who Walks on Water		Mul-wileul geodneun yeoja		

== Awards ==
- 1963 the 3rd Blue Dragon Film Awards: Favorite Actress
- 1964 the 3rd Blue Dragon Film Awards: Favorite Actress
- 1965 the 3rd Blue Dragon Film Awards: Best Actress for The Beautiful Eyes (아름다운 눈동자 Areumdaun Nundongja)
