= Jo Mi-ryeong (actress, born 1929) =

South Korean actress

- Born: February 4, 1929; Changwon, South Korea
- Occupation: Actress

Korean name
- Hangul: 조제순
- Hanja: 趙濟順
- RR: Jo Jesun
- MR: Cho Chesun

Stage name
- Hangul: 조미령
- Hanja: 趙美鈴
- RR: Jo Miryeong
- MR: Cho Miryŏng

Jo Mi-ryeong (born February 4, 1929) is a South Korean actress. Jo was born in South Gyeongsang province in 1929.

== Filmography ==
*Note; the whole list is referenced.

Year	English title	Korean title	Romanization	Role	Director
	Two Sons		Du adeul		
	The Sisters		Idaero Gandahaedo		
	A Train to Beijing		Bukgyeong Yeolcha		
	Snowy Night		Nun Narineun Bam		
	Chunwon Lee Gwang-Su		Chunwon Lee Gwangsu		
	New Bride		Sae Saeksi		
	Sorry to Give You Trouble		Sinse Jom Jijagu-yo		
	Romance Mama		Romaenseu Mama		
	Warm wind		Nanpung		
	Don't Leave Behind Your Love		Jeong Dugo Gajima		
	Jade Pin		Ok Binyeo		
	Nam		Nam		
	The Adventure of Great Ttolttori		Dae Ttolttoriui Moheom		
	I Will Give You Everything		Mongttang Deurilkkayo		
	Blues of the Twilight		Hwanghon-ui Bureuseu		
	A Princess Daughter-in-law		Gongju Myeoneuri		
	Love Rides the Surf		Sarangeun Padoreul Tago		
	A Regret		Han		
	A Deviation		Talseon		
	The First Night		Choya		
	Stroller		Yeogma		
	The Three Hen-pecked Generations		Gongcheoga samdae		
	One-sided Love of Princess		Gongjunimui Jjaksarang		
	A College Girl Asking for Direction		Gil-eul Munneun Yeodaesaeng		
	A Miracle of Gratitude		Bo-eunui Gijeok		
	A Madame		Anbangmanim		
	Clouds, Let Me Ask You Something		Tteungureuma Malmureo Boja		
	Because I Am a Woman		Yeojaigi Ttaemune		
	Phoenix		Bulsajo		
	Divorce Clinic		Ihonsangdamso		
	Affection		Yujeong		
1967	The Life of Na Woon-gyu		Naungyu Ilsaeng		
	Stronger Than Love		Sarangboda Ganghan Geot		
	The Last Empress		Majimak Hwanghu Yunbi		
	A Tear-Soaked Crown		Nunmul Jeojeun Wanggwan		
	The DMZ		Bimujang Jidae		
	The Youngest Daughter		Mangnaettal		
	A Legend of Urchins		Yalgaejeon		
	Courage is Alive		Yongsaneun Sara Itda		
1965	Sad Story of Self Supporting Child		Jeo Haneul-edo Seulpeum-i		
	The Lady of Honor		Jeonggyeong Bu-in		
	Look Up the Sky and Look Down the Earth		Haneulbogo Ttang-eul Bogo		
	The Legal Wife		Keundaek		
	Beauty Searching Authorities		Chaehongsa		
	Every Dog Has His Day		Jwigumeong-edo Byeotddeulnal Itda		
	The Scarlet Skirt		Juhong Skeoteu		
	A Life Wailing in Sorrow		Ulmyeonseo Hansesang		
	Madam O		Omadam		
	The Sunflower Blooming at Night		Bam-e pin Haebaragi		
	The Two Fathers		Du Appa		
	The Way of the Woman		Yeoja-ui Gil		
	Seaman Park		Madoroseu Park		
	I Have Been Cheated		Naneun Sogatda		
	The Chaste Woman Arang		Arang-ui Jeongjo		
	The Housemaid		Singmo		
	A Ghost Story		Mokdandeunggi		
	Sakyamuni Buddha		Seokgamoni		
	The Modern Grandma		Sinsik Halmeoni		
	Are You Really a Beauty?		Niga Jalna Ilsaeg-inya		
	The Single Mom		Hol-eomeoni		
	The Old Korean Folk song in Downtown		Dosimui Hyangga		
	The Apron		Haengjuchima		
	My Wife is Best		Nae Anaega Choegoya		
	How to Manipulate Men		Namja Jojongbeob		
1963	Bloodline		Hyeolmaek		
	Samyeongdang		Samyeongdang		
	Good and Better		Ttwineun Nom Wi-e Naneun Nom		
	Dad, Please Get Married!		Abeoji Gyeolhonhaseyo		
	Even Dandelions Bloom in Spring		Mindeullekkotdobom-imyeon Pinda		
	Because They Love Until Death		Jukdorok Saranghaeseo		
	Love for 300 Years		Aejeongsambaengnyeon		
	Romantic Family		Romance Gajok		
	Seong Chun-hyang from Hanyang		Hanyang-eseo On Seong Chunhyang		
	Reunion		Jaehoe		
	Bye Dad		Appa-annyeong		
	Gaya's House		Gaya-ui Jib		
	Flyboy's Penniless Trip		Huraiboi Mujeon-yeohaenggi		
	Love Affair		Romanseugrei		
	The Woman's Key		Yeoja-ui Yeolsoe		
	A Wanderer		Juyucheonha		
1962	Coming Home		Gwihyang		
	When the Cloud Scatters Away		Gureumi Heuteojil Ttae		
	A Runaway Wife		Anaereul Ppae-atgin Sanai		
	Yang Kuei-Fei, a Destructive Beauty		Cheonha-ilsaek Yang Gwibi		
	Everyone Misses Someone		Geuri-umeun Gaseummada		
	Great Monk Wonhyo		Wonhyo Daesa		
	Until I Die		Sarainneun Geunalkkaji		
	Body Is Sad		Yukcheneun Seulpeuda		
	Between the Sky and the Earth		Haneulgwa Ttangsa-i-e		
	The Best Bride and a Plain Young Man		Teukdeungsinbu-wa Samdeung Sillang		
	A Boat That Belongs to No One		Imja-eomneun Narutbae		
	Women Rule		Yeoin Cheonha		
	Undercover Agent Park Munsu		Amhaeng-eosa Park Munsu		
	Sorrow Is Mine		Seulpeumeun Naegeman		
	I'll Never Fall in Love Again		Sarang-eul Dasi Haji Aneuri		
	Mojacho		Mojacho		
	Life of a Woman		Yeoja-ui Ilsaeng		
1962	The Story of Jang-hwa and Hong-ryeon		Dae Jang-hwa Hong-ryeonjeon		
	Mr. Gong		Gamnamugol Gongseobang		
	Don't Talk until Tomorrow		Naeil Kkajineun Malhaji Mara		
	What Happens in an Alley		Golmogan Punggyeong		
	Training to Be a Couple		Gyeonseub Bubu		
	Queen Dowager Inmok		Inmok Daebi		
	Bravo, Young Ones!		Burabo Cheongchun		
	Walking in Tears		Nunmul-eorin Baljaguk		
	Great Hero, Lee Sun-sin		Seong-ung Lee Sun-sin		
	Even though the World Crumbles		Haneuri Muneojyeodo		
	Fishermen		Eobudeul		
	A Sunflower Family		Haebaragi Gajok		
	My Only Love		Ilpyeondansim		
	A Song of Passion		Gyeokjeongga		
	An Idiot		Babo Chilseong-i		
	My Father Was on a Death Row		Sahyeongsu-ui Ttal		
	Wonsullang		Wonsullang		
	Horizon		Jipyeongseon		
	A Bonanza		Nodaji		
	When Love Knocks		Sarang-i Muneul Dudeurilttae		
	Emile		Emille Jong		
	Daughter of a Coachman		Yeokbu-ui Ttal		
	Lady Jang		Janghuibin		
	Farewell at Busan		Ibyeol-ui Busan Jeonggeojang		
	Yangsando		Yangsando		
	A Star		Byeol		
	A Coachman		Mabu		
	For This Moment		I Sungan-eul Wihayeo		
	A Disobedient Son		Bulhyoja		
	Twilight		Hwanghon		
	Easygoing		Cheonhataepyeong		
	Mother Earth		Daeji-ui eomeoni		
	Bawigogae		Bawigogae		
	A Sunny Field		Haesbich ssod-ajineun beolpan		
	A Tragedy on Earth		Jisang-ui bigeug		
	A Young Look		Jeolm-eun pyojeong		
	Ah! Baekbeom Kim Gu		Ah! Baek Beom Kim Ku Seonsaeng		
	Mr. Park		Parkseobang		
	Song in My Heart		Naegaseum-e geu nolaeleul		
	A Fig		Muhwagwa		
	A Memorandum of a Female Teacher		Eoneu yeogyosa-ui sugi		
	Your Voice		Geudae mogsori		
	A Man from Gyeongsang Province		Gyeongsangdo Sanai		
	Soil		Heulg		
	A Son's Judgement		Adeul-ui simpan		
	Sorrow like a River		Seulpeum-eun gangmulcheoleom		
	Before Sunset		Haetteol-eojigi jeon-e		
	A Terminal Station of Separation		Ibyeol-ui jongchag-yeog		
	A Pearl Tower		Jinjutab		
1959	A Female Boss		Yeosajang		
	Always Thinking of You		Jana Kkaena		
	Oh! My Hometown		O Nae Gohyang		
	Heungbu and Nolbu		Heungbuwa Nolbu		
	A Golden Scar		Hwanggeumui Sangcheo		
	Diary of Youths		Cheongchunilgi		
	A Skinny and a Fatty Went to a Nonsan Army Training Camp		Holjjugi Ttungttungi Nonsan Hullyeonsoae Gada		
	Terms of Marriage		Gyeolhonjogeon		
1959	Even the Clouds Are Drifting		Gureumeun Heulleodo		
	A Band for Proposal		Guhongyeolsadae		
1959	Defiance of Teenager		Sipdaeui Banhang		
	A Barber of Jangmaru Village		Jangmaruchonui Ibalsa		
	Nameless Stars		Ireumeomneun Byeoldeul		
	Madam Butterfly		Nabibuin		
	I Am Alone		Na honjaman-i		
	The Unknown Future		Salampalja al su eobsda		
	The Love Marriage		Ja-yugyeolhon		
	A Mother's Love		Mojeong		
	The Shamanic Ritual of Bae Baeng-Yi		Baebaeng-i gut		
1957	A Woman's War		Yeoseongjeonseon		
	Arirang		Arirang		
	A Woman's Enemy		Yeoseong-ui jeog		
	The Wedding Day		Sijibganeun nal		
	The Crossroad		Gyochalo		
	Prince Ho-Dong and Princess Nak-Rang		WangjaHodonggwa Nakranggongju		
	The Tragedy of King Dan Jong		Danjong-aesa		
	Chun-hyang's Story		Chunhyangjeon		
	A Sea Gull		Galmaegi		

== Awards ==
- 1966, the 4th Blue Dragon Film Awards, Best Supporting Actress for Na Un-gyu ui insaeng (나운규 일생)
