= Ju Jeung-ryu =

South Korean actress (1926–1980)

- Born: 11 February 1926; Keijō, Korea, Empire of Japan
- Died: 18 September 1980 (aged 54); Seoul, South Korea
- Occupation: Actress
- Years active: 1949–1977

Korean name
- Hangul: 주증녀
- Hanja: 朱曾女
- RR: Ju Jeungnyeo
- MR: Chu Chŭngnyŏ

Ju Jeung-ryu (Korean: 주증녀; February 11, 1926 – 1980) was a South Korean actress whose fame peaked in the 1950s and 1960s. She starred in about 400 films. Ju was born in Yonghung, Hamkyongnam-do, nowadays in North Korea. While attending Hamnam Girls' High School, Ju became an ardent play fan. When she became eighteen, she ran away from home and joined in the theater company, Gohyeop. Her first role as an actress was a maid in Muyeongtap (무영탑) written by Yu Chi-jin.

== Filmography ==
*Note; the whole list is referenced.

English title	Romanization
Night Journey	Yahaeng
Blue Days	Cheongsaegsidae
Windmill Of My Mind	Naema-eum-ui pungcha
Similar Toes	Balgalag-i dalm-assda
Graduation Examination	Jol-eobsiheom
Story Of The Youth	Cheongchungeugjang
Wasteland	Hwangto
Tearful Sandbag	Nunmuljeoj-eun saendeubaeg
End of An Affair	Aejong
The Instinct	Bonneung
A boat whistle	Baesgodong
Reminiscences	Hoesang
The Earth	Toji
Iron Mask Man	Cheolmyeongaeg
Parade of Wives	Anaedeul-ui haengjin
Ecstasy	Hwanghol
Testimony	Jeung-eon
The Great Hell	Daeji-og
A way of farewell	Ibyeol-ui gil
Nation wide Graduates	Paldojol-eobsaeng
When a little dream blooms...	Jag-eun kkum-i kkochpil ttae
Girls' high school days	Yeogosijeol
Gate of woman	Hongsalmun
Two sons crying for their mother love	Mojeong-e uneun du-adeul
The Wedding Ring	Gyeolhonbanji
A student of life	Insaeng-yuhagsaeng
The golden harbor in horror	Gongpo-ui hwanggeumbudu
I want to be in your arms again	Geudae gaseum-e dasihanbeon
Bun-Rye's story	Bunlyegi
Is There Sadness in Heaven (sequel)	Jeo haneul-edo seulpeum-i
Mi-ae	Cheongchunmujeong
Female Soldiers from All the Provinces	Paldo-yeogun
The Little Bridegroom's Return	Dol-a-on agisinlang
Little Bridegroom (the sequel)	Kkomasnilang
The Lost Wedding Veil	Ilh-eobeolin myeonsapo
Dangerous Liaison	Wiheomhan gwangye
Because You Are a Woman	Yeoja-igi ttaemun-e
Little Bridegroom	Kkomasinlang
Tears in the Heart	Gaseum-e Maetchin Nunmul
Chaser	Chugyeogja
Yun Sim-deok	Yun Sim-deok
Everything of Woman	Yeoja-ui Modeun Geot
Temporary Government in Shanghai	Sanghae Imsi Jeongbu Wa Kim Gu Seonsaeng
Flower Sandals	Kkot Beoseon
The Second Wife	Huchwidaeg
A Letter from an Unknown Woman	Moreuneun Yeoin-ui Pyeonji
Rebirth	Jaesaeng
Forget-me-not	Mulmangcho
A Lonely Wild Goose	Ulgo Ganeun Oegireogi
Women of Yi-Dynasty	Ijo Yeoin Janhogsa
A Devoted Love	Sunaebo
Chunhyang	Chunhyang
Correspondent in Tokyo	Donggyeong Teugpawon
Potato	Gamja
A Japanese	Ilbon-in
Little Lady	Mini Agassi
Princess Guseul	Guseul Gongju
Flowers Over the Country	Gangsane Kkochi Pine
Desire	Galmang
Going Well	Jal Doegamnida
A Young Zelkova	Jeolmeun Neutinamu
Salt Pond	Sujeonjidae
Sobbing Swan	Heuneukkineun Baekjo
Crossed Love	Eommaya Nunaya Gangbyeon Salja
The Sister's Diary	Eunni-eui Ilgi
Trumpet in Night Sky	Bamhaneurui Treompet
Unfulfilled Love	Motdahan Sarang
A Victim	Pihaeja
Hail	Bing-u
Monster Yonggari	Daegoesu Yonggari
Lovers	Aein
Full Ship	Manseon
Dongsimcho	Dongsimcho
A Traveling King	Nageune Imgeum
Hometown	Gohyang
Accusation	Gobal
Heartbreaks	Gaseum Apeuge
Children in the Firing Range	Sagyeokjang-ui Aideul
The Queen of Elegy	Ellejiui Yeowang
A Female Student And an Old Gentleman	Yeodaesaenggwa Nosinsa
Injo Restoration	Injobanjeong
Did I Come to Cry	Ullyeogo Naega Wanna
Mist	Angae
Flame in the Valley	Sanbul
A Child Who Was Born in the Year of Liberation	Haebangdong-i
The World Is Chaos	Sesangeun Yojigyeong
White Wall and Black Wall	Huin Byeok Geomeun Byeok
The Last Empress	Majimak Hwanghu Yunbi
I Am a King	Naneun Wang-ida
The River Knows It All	Jeo Gang-eun Algo Itda
Ok-i Makes a Judge Cry	Beopchangeul ulrin ok-i
Three Brothers and Sisters in the Shade	Geuneuljin Samnammae
The Woman with a Past	Gwageoreul gajin yeoja
The Nickname of the Student	Maengkkong-i
Mother's Heyday	Eomeoni-ui Cheongchun
Sorrow Even Up in Heaven	Jeo Haneul-edo Seulpeum-i
The Ruler of the Unnamed Street	Mumyeongga-ui Jibaeja
Every Dog Has His Day	Jwigumeong-edo Byeotddeulnal Itda
Behold this Woman	I yeojareul Bora
The Order to Kill	Sal-in Myeongryeong
I Can Also Love	Nado Yeon-aehal Su Itda
The Pay Envelope	Wolgeupbongtu
Keep Silent When Leaving	Tteonal Ddaeneun Mareopossi
The Headwoman of Pal Tong and Pal Ban	Paltong Palban Yeobanjang
The Girl Is Nineteen	Yeoja Sipguse
The Teacher with Ten Daughters	Sipjamae Seonsaeng
The Asphalt Pavement	Asphalt
The Lovebirds Boat	Wonangseon
The Heartbreaking Story	Danjanglok
Just Watch What We Do and See	Dugoman Bose-yo
The Barefooted Young	Maenbal-ui Cheongchun
Yeodo	Yeodo
Get on the Express Train	Geupaeng-yeolchareul Tara
A Sad Story of Danjong	Danjong-aesa
I Have a Secret	Naneun Bimiri Itda
Yulgok and His Mother	Yulgokgwa Geu Eeomeoni
Happy Solitude	Haengbokhan Godok
How to Manipulate Men	Namja Jojongbeob
The Classroom of Youth	Cheongchun Gyosil
The Stepmother	Sae-eomma
Samyeongdang	Samyeongdang
The Man's Tears	Sanaiui Nunmul
Rice	Ssal
Rulers of the Land	Daeji-ui Jibaeja
Call Me Mother Someday	Eonjenga Eomeonira Bulleoda-o
The First Wife	Jogangjicheo
Goryeojang	Goryeojang
A Salaryman	Wolgeubjaeng-i
The Seven Princesses	Chilgongju
Sorrow Is Mine	Seulpeumeun Naegeman
Queen Dowager Inmok	Inmok Daebi
New Wife	Saedaek
Beautiful Shroud	Areumda-un Su-ui
The Sea Knows	Hyeonhaetaneun Algo Itda
Ondal the Fool and Princess Pyeong-Gang	Babo Ondal-gwa Pyeonggang Gongju
Tragedy of Yun	Dangjaengbihwa
My Only Love	Ilpyeondansim
Prince Yeonsan	Yeonsan-gun
My Father	Abeoji
Lady Jang	Janghuibin
A Flower of Evil	Ag-ui Kkot
No Sorrow	Seulpeumeun Eopda
Don't Touch Me	Naemom-e Son-eul Daeji Mara
A Beloved Face	Geuli-un geu eolgul
Ah! Baekbeom Kim Gu	Ah! Baek Beom Kim Ku Seonsaeng
A Romantic Papa	Lomaenseuppappa
Mother's Power	Eomeoni-ui him
The Housemaid	Hanyeo
A Star Crying Alone	Hollo Uneun Byeol
A Wife	Anae
Sorrow of Twilight	Hwanghonui Aesang
A Golden Scar	Hwanggeumui Sangcheo
The Romantic Train	Nangmannyeolcha
Preconditions for Happiness	Haengbogui Jogeon
A Flower Blossomed Again	Dasi Pineun Kkot
Was She Happy?	Geu Yeojaneun Haengbokhaeydeonga
It's not her sin	Geu Yeojaui Joega Anida
A White Pearl	Baekjinju
Always Thinking of You	Jana Kkaena
Dongsimcho	Dongsimcho
The Life of a Flower	Kkotdo saengmyeong-i itdamyeon
The Mother and Daughter	Monyeo
The Secret	Byeolman-i aneun bimil
The Star of Lost Paradise	sequela
Flowing Star	Heureuneun Byeol
An Incense Fire	Mado-ui hyangbul
The Star in My Heart	Byeol-a nae gaseum-e
Love	Sarang
Life of a Woman	Geu yeoja-ui ilsaeng
The Red and Blue Thread	Cheongsilhongsil
The Star of Lost Paradise	Sillag-won-ui byeol
The Life	Insaenghwabo
Wife and Mistress	Cheo-wa ae-in
Stagecoach of Life	Insaeng-yeogmacha
A Woman's Enemy	Yeoseong-ui jeog
Lover	Ae-in
The Battle Line of Freedom	Ja-yujeonseon
The Castle of Hatred	Wonhan-ui seong
Land of Love	Ae-won-ui hyangto
Heung-bu and Nol-bu	Heung-buwa nolbu
The Sad Story of a Woman	Yeo-in-ae-sa
The Woman's Diary	Yeoseong-ilgi
The Motherland	Jogug-ui eomeoni

=== Producer ===
English title	Romanization
Was She Happy?	Geu Yeojaneun Haengbokhaeydeonga

== Awards ==
- 1967 6th Grand Bell Awards : Best Supporting Actress for Full Ship (Manseon)

== See also ==
- Cinema of Korea
