= List of South Korean films of 1976 =

A list of films produced in South Korea in 1976:

Title	Director	Cast	Genre	Notes
1976
Ape				
Aescetic	Kim Su-hyeong			
Bruce Lee Fights Back from the Grave				
Case Number 963				
Concentration	Choi In-hyun			
Hot Wind in Arabia				
I Am Really Sorry	Mun Yeo-song	Im Ye-jin; Lee Deok-hwa	Youth Melodrama	Sequel to Never Forget Me
The Industrious Wife				
Love of Blood Relations	Kim Ki-young			
Never Forget Me	Mun Yeo-song	Im Ye-jin; Lee Deok-hwa	Youth Melodrama	
Vicious Plot				
Wangshimni	Im Kwon-taek			
Blood Relations 핏줄; Pitjul		Jeong Yun-hui		
Rocking Horse And A Girl 목마와 숙녀; Mogma-wa sugnyeo		Jeong Yun-hui		
Yalkae, a Joker in High School 고교얄개; Gogyo-yalgae	Seok Rae-myeong	Jeong Yun-hui		
