= Kim Bo-yeon =

South Korean actress (born 1957)

- Born: Kim Bok-soon; December 31, 1957 (age 68); Seoul, South Korea
- Other names: Kim Yoon-joo; Ameliia Kim
- Education: Anyang High School of Arts – Theater and Film; Tusculum College – Stage Design
- Occupations: Actress; singer
- Years active: 1974–present
- Spouses: Lee Si-woo (m. 1988; div. 1997) Jeon No-min (m. 2004; div. 2012)
- Children: 2

Korean name
- Hangul: 김윤주
- RR: Gim Yunju
- MR: Kim Yunju

Stage name
- Hangul: 김보연
- Hanja: 金甫娟
- RR: Gim Boyeon
- MR: Kim Poyŏn

Former name
- Hangul: 김복순
- Hanja: 金福順
- RR: Gim Boksun
- MR: Kim Poksun

Kim Bo-yeon (Korean: 김보연; born December 31, 1957), birth name Kim Bok-soon (김복순), is a South Korean actress.

== Career ==
Kim Bo-yeon graduated from Anyang High School of Arts, and on the principal's recommendation, she was cast in her acting debut, the film A Season of Blooming Love in 1974, followed by the television drama 제3교실 in 1975. As a supporting actress in 1976's "Really Really" series (Never Forget Me, I Am Really Sorry), she and costars Im Ye-jin and Lee Deok-hwa emerged as popular teen stars of the 1970s. Kim further rose to stardom in her role of a high school girl with a brain tumor in Kim Soo-hyun's drama You in 1977.

After You ended in 1978, a record company signed Kim, and she eventually released four albums and one Christmas album. Her single "Love is the Flower of Life" won the Gold Prize at the 1983 Seoul International Song Festival. In 1982, she won Best Actress at the prestigious Grand Bell Awards for her performance in Bae Chang-ho's film People of Kkobang Neighborhood.

Plagued by rumors that she was romantically involved with Hyundai founder Chung Ju-young (which she denied), Kim left the entertainment industry temporarily in 1984 to study in the United States. She majored in Stage Design at Tusculum College in Tennessee.

Kim returned to Korea and resumed acting in 1987. In the following years, she received good reviews and acting recognition from the Chunsa Film Art Awards and Blue Dragon Film Awards for her roles in Silver Stallion (1991), Road to the Racetrack (1991), and A Hot Roof (1995). Though in recent years she's become more active in television, in 2009 Kim won Best Supporting Actress at the Buil Film Awards for playing a religion-obsessed mother in horror film Possessed.

Born as Kim Bok-soon, she officially changed her real name to Kim Yoon-joo (Korean: 김윤주).

== Personal life ==
Kim married in 1988, and had two daughters. She and her husband later divorced.

She met actor Jeon No-min on the set of TV series A Saint and a Witch in 2003, and they married a year later. It was the second marriage for both. The relationship was considered controversial at the time because of their nine-year age difference. The couple began a makgeolli business named Family's Honor in 2008, but after it failed, the resulting financial strain caused the couple to divorce in 2012.

== Filmography ==
=== Film ===
- Casa Amor: Exclusive for Ladies (2015)
- My PS Partner (2012)
- Moby Dick (2011)
- Sunny (2011) (cameo)
- In Love and War (2011) (cameo)
- Yogurt Lady (short film, 2010)
- Blades of Blood (2010) (cameo)
- Possessed (2009).
- Holy Daddy (2006)
- Duelist (2005)
- Temptation of Wolves (2004)
- He Was Cool (2004)
- Low Life (2004)
- Drama Inside of a Skirt (1997)
- A Hot Roof (1995)
- Declaration of Genius (1995)
- My Dear Keum-hong (1995)
- The Young Man (1994)
- A Heavy Bird (1994)
- Pro at Love, Amateur at Marriage (1994)
- Road to the Racetrack (1991)
- Silver Stallion (1991)
- My Love, My Bride (1990)
- Mayumi (1990)
- The World of Women (1988)
- A Forest Where a Woman Breathes (1988)
- Hello, God (1987)
- Wild Scoundrels of College (1983)
- Madam Oh's Day Out (1983)
- People of Kkobang Neighborhood aka People in the Slums (1982)
- A Fine, Windy Day (1980)
- Run, Balloon! aka College Festival (1980)
- Earth Tremors (1980)
- A Woman's Pain (1980)
- Butterfly Amongst Flowers (1979)
- The Woman on the Ferris Wheel (1979)
- The Daughter-in-law Born in the Year of the Horse aka A Stubborn Daughter-in-law (1979)
- A Girl Named Jegal Maeng-sun aka Country Girl (1978)
- Our High School Days (1978)
- Prankster of Girl's High School aka Tomboys of School (1977)
- Season of Love (1977)
- I Am Really Sorry (1976)
- Mother and Son (1976)
- Never Forget Me (1976)
- A Season of Blooming Love (1974)

=== Television series ===
- Jinxed at First (2022) - Eun Ok-jin
- Love (ft. Marriage and Divorce) (2021) - Season 1–2
- Once Again (2020)
- A Piece of Your Mind (2020)
- Misty (2018)
- You Are Too Much (2017)
- Shopping King Louie (2016)
- Monster (2016)
- The Virtual Bride (2015)
- The Invincible Lady Cha (2015)
- Bel Ami (KBS2, 2013)
- Princess Aurora (2013)
- A Hundred Year Legacy (2013) (cameo)
- My Kids Give Me a Headache (2013) (cameo)
- The King of Dramas (2012) (cameo)
- Feast of the Gods (2012)
- Dangerous Woman (2011–2012)
- Iron Daughters-in-Law (2011)
- New Tales of Gisaeng (2011)
- Golden Fish (2010)
- Again, My Love (2009) (cameo)
- Amnok River Flows (2008)
- Love Marriage (2008)
- Golden Era of Daughters-in-law (2007–2008)
- Ahyeong-dong Madam (2007–2008)
- Snow Flower (2006–2007)
- Hwang Jini (2006)
- How Much Love (2006)
- Smile Again (2006)
- Precious Family (2004)
- Island Village Teacher (2004)
- Thousand Years of Love (2003)
- A Saint and a Witch (2003)
- Soon-deok-yi (2003)
- Ice Flower (2002–2003)
- Wonderful Days (2001–2002)
- Way of Living: Couple (2001–2002)
- Jaedong (1997)
- Mom's Out of Town (1996)
- The Bicycle Riding Woman (1996)
- The Reason I Won't Divorce (1996)
- The Brothers' River (1996–1997)
- The Fourth Republic (1995)
- Two Dads (1995)
- Make a Song (1995)
- Adam's City (1994)
- Big Sister (1994)
- Two Women (1992)
- Two Sisters (1992)
- Small City (1992)
- Country of Water (1991)
- Magpie-in-law (1991)
- Dark Sky, Dark Bird (1990)
- When Flowers Bloom and Birds Cry (1990)
- Blazing River (1989)
- I Went There (1983)
- Annals of Rejection – Trade King Choi Bong-jun (1983)
- It's Me (1982)
- Women's Story – Seogungmama (1982)
- Sword and Dew (1981)
- Portrait of the Days of Youth (1980)
- Last Stop (1980)
- Like Mom and Dad (1979)
- Wife of One's Youngest Son (1978)
- You (1977)
- Wild Rose (1976)
- Class 3 (1975)

=== Variety show ===
- See You at 9 (1981)
- King of Mask Singer (2015)

=== Radio program ===
- 9595 Show

== Theater ==
- As You Like It (1980)

== Discography ==
- Kim Bo-yeon '82 (4th album, 1982)
- Golden 3 (3rd album, 1980)
- Golden Hits (2nd album, 1979)
- Carol Song Special (1979)
- Kim Bo-yeon's Golden Album (1st album, 1978)

== Awards ==
- 2013 MBC Drama Awards: Golden Acting Award, Actress (Princess Aurora)
- 2010 MBC Drama Awards: Golden Acting Award, Actress in a Serial Drama (Golden Fish)
- 2009 32nd Golden Cinematography Awards: Most Popular Actress (Possessed)
- 2009 18th Buil Film Awards: Best Supporting Actress (Possessed)
- 1995 6th Chunsa Film Art Awards: Best Supporting Actress (A Hot Roof)
- 1992 3rd Chunsa Film Art Awards: Best Supporting Actress (Road to the Racetrack)
- 1991 12th Blue Dragon Film Awards: Best Supporting Actress (Silver Stallion)
- 1991 2nd Chunsa Film Art Awards: Best Supporting Actress (Silver Stallion)
- 1983 6th Seoul International Song Festival: Gold Prize (Love is the Flower of Life)
- 1982 21st Grand Bell Awards: Best Actress (People of Kkobang Neighborhood)
- 1978 17th Grand Bell Awards: Best New Actress (A Girl Named Jegal Maeng-sun)
- 1978 14th Baeksang Arts Awards: Best New Actress, TV category (You)
- 1977 MBC Drama Awards: Best New Actress (You)
