= A Happy Day of Jinsa Maeng =

- Directed by: Lee Yong-min
- Written by: Oh Yeong-jin
- Screenplay by: Oh Yeong-jin
- Produced by: Lee Seong-geun
- Starring: Kim Seung-ho; Choi Eun-hee; Kim Jin-kyu
- Cinematography: Lee Yong-min
- Edited by: Yu Jae-won
- Music by: Kim Dae-hyeon
- Release date: March 8, 1962
- Running time: 124 minutes
- Country: South Korea
- Language: Korean

A Happy Day of Jinsa Maeng (Korean: 맹진사댁 경사; RR: Maengjinsadaek gyeongsa) is a 1962 South Korean comedy film directed by Lee Yong-min.

== Synopsis ==
When a rumour spreads that his future son-in-law is crippled, he resorts to tricks to marry off his maid Ip-bun (Choi Eun-hee) instead.

== Cast ==
- Kim Seung-ho as Maeng Jin-sa
- Choi Eun-hee as Ip-bun
- Kim Jin-kyu as Mi-eon
- Kim Hee-kap
- Lee Bin-hwa as Gap-bun
