= 2010 MBC Drama Awards =

29th edition of award ceremony

- Date: December 30, 2010
- Hosted by: Kim Young-man; Lee So-yeon

Highlights
- Grand Prize (Daesang): Han Hyo-joo; Kim Nam-joo

Television coverage
- Network: MBC

The 2010 MBC Drama Awards is a ceremony honoring the outstanding achievement in television on the Munhwa Broadcasting Corporation (MBC) network for the year of 2010. It was held on December 30, 2010 and hosted by Kim Young-man and actress Lee So-yeon.

== Nominations and winners ==
(Winners denoted in bold)

Grand Prize (Daesang)	Achievement Award
**Han Hyo-joo** – **Dong Yi**; **Kim Nam-joo** – **Queen of Reversals**	**Jung Hye-sun** – **Home Sweet Home**; **Na Moon-hee** – **It's Me, Grandma**; **Sung Kyung-seob** – **News Touch**
Top Excellence Award, Actor	Top Excellence Award, Actress
**Ji Jin-hee** – **Dong Yi**; **Jung Joon-ho** – **Queen of Reversals**; Lee Sun-kyun – Pasta; Lee Tae-gon – Golden Fish	**Gong Hyo-jin** – **Pasta**; **Shin Eun-kyung** – **Flames of Desire**; Han Hyo-joo – Dong Yi; Kim Nam-joo – Queen of Reversals
Excellence Award, Actor	Excellence Award, Actress
**Lee Min-ho** – **Personal Taste**; **Park Si-hoo** – **Queen of Reversals**; Kim Hyun-joong – Playful Kiss; Lee Chun-hee – Gloria	**Lee So-yeon** – **Dong Yi**; **Park Eun-hye** – **Pink Lipstick**; Bae Doona – Gloria; So Yoo-jin – Golden Fish
Golden Acting Award, Actor in a Serial Drama	Golden Acting Award, Actress in a Serial Drama
**Park Sang-won** – **Golden Fish**	**Kim Bo-yeon** – **Golden Fish**
Golden Acting Award, Supporting Actor	Golden Acting Award, Supporting Actress
**Kim Yu-seok** – **Dong Yi**	**Ha Yoo-mi** – **Queen of Reversals**
Golden Acting Award, Veteran Actor	Golden Acting Award, Veteran Actress
**Im Chae-moo** – **Enjoy Life**	**Park Jung-soo** – **Enjoy Life**, **Queen of Reversals**
Best New Actor	Best New Actress
**Lee Sang-yoon** – **Home Sweet Home**; **Lee Tae-sung** – **Enjoy Life**, **Playful Kiss**; Alex Chu – Pasta; Lim Seulong – Personal Taste	**Jo Yoon-hee** – **Golden Fish**; **Park Ha-sun** – **Dong Yi**; Jung So-min – Playful Kiss; Maya – Dandelion Family
Best Young Actor	Best Young Actress
**Lee Hyung-suk** – **Dong Yi**	**Kim Yoo-jung** – **Dong Yi**, **Flames of Desire**
PD Award	Writer of the Year
**Chae Jung-an** – **Queen of Reversals**; **Lee Tae-gon** – **Golden Fish**; **Oh Kyung-hoon** – **Home Sweet Home**	**Go Hye-rim** – **Tears of the Amazon**; **Jo Eun-jung** – **Golden Fish**; **Park Hyun-joo** – **Enjoy Life**
Popularity Award, Actor	Popularity Award, Actress
**Kim Hyun-joong** – **Playful Kiss**; Ji Jin-hee - Dong Yi; Jung Joon-ho - Queen of Reversals; Lee Min-ho - Personal Taste; Lee Sun-kyun - Pasta; Yoo Seung-ho - Flames of Desire	**Han Hyo-joo** – **Dong Yi**; Gong Hyo-jin - Pasta; Kim Hye-soo - Home Sweet Home; Kim Nam-joo - Queen of Reversals; Seo Woo - Flames of Desire; Son Ye-jin - Personal Taste
Best Couple Award	Viewer's Favorite Drama of the Year
**Lee Sun-kyun** and **Gong Hyo-jin** – **Pasta**; Ji Jin-hee and Han Hyo-joo - Dong Yi; Jung Joon-ho and Kim Nam-joo - Queen of Reversals; Kim Hyun-joong and Jung So-min - Playful Kiss; Lee Min-ho and Son Ye-jin - Personal Taste	**Dong Yi**; Golden Fish; Pasta; Personal Taste; Queen of Reversals
Family Award	Best TV Voice Actor
**Gloria**	**Sin Seong-ho**; **Song Joon-seok**
Special Award in TV, Announcer	Special Award in TV, Reporter
**Moon Ji-ae** – **Zero**	**Park Jin-woo** – **Live This Morning**
Top Excellence Award in Radio	Excellence Award in Radio
**Jo Young-nam** – **Now Is the Era of Radio**	**Bae Chil-soo** – **Bae Han-sung and Bae Chil-soo's Fight**; **Hyun Young** – **Jung-oh's Request Line**
Best Newcomer in Radio	Best Writer in Radio
**Noh Hong-chul** – **Noh Hong-chul's Good Friends**	**Park Chang-seob** – **Sohn Suk-hee's Focus**
Special Award in Radio, Announcer	Special Award in Radio, Reporter
**Lee Joo-yeon** – **Lee Joo-yeon's Movie Music**	**Kim Yu-ri** – **2 o'clock Date**
