= A Flower of Evil =

- Poster to A Flower of Evil (1961)
- Hangul: 악의 꽃
- Hanja: 惡의 꽃
- RR: Agui kkot
- MR: Agŭi kkot
- Directed by: Lee Yong-min
- Written by: Nam Tae-gwon
- Produced by: Lee Yong-min
- Starring: Lee Ye-chun; Do Kum-bong
- Cinematography: Choe Ho-jin
- Edited by: Lee Yong-min
- Music by: Hwang Mun-pyeong
- Distributed by: Lee Yong-Min Production
- Release date: March 31, 1961
- Country: South Korea
- Language: Korean

A Flower of Evil (Korean: 악의 꽃; RR: Agui kkot) is a 1961 South Korean horror film directed and produced by Lee Yong-min.

== Plot ==
After many years of work, a scientist obsessed with revenge develops a flower that will do his bidding and drink human blood.
