= The Fishermen and the City =

Korean television program

- Promotional poster for S1
- Also known as: Urban Fisherman; City Fisherman
- Hangul: 나만 믿고 따라와, 도시어부
- Hanja: 나만 믿고 따라와, 都市漁夫
- Lit.: Trust Only Me and Follow Me, Urban Fisherman
- RR: Naman mitgo ttarawa, dosieobu
- MR: Naman mitko ttarawa, tosiŏbu
- Genre: Reality show
- Starring: Lee Deok-hwa; Lee Kyung-kyu; Lee Soo-geun; Lee Tae-gon; Kim Jun-hyun
- Country of origin: South Korea
- Original language: Korean
- No. of seasons: 4
- No. of episodes: 203

Production
- Production location: Various Location
- Running time: 80 minutes

Original release
- Network: Channel A
- Release: September 7, 2017 – January 27, 2022

The Fishermen and the City (Korean: 나만 믿고 따라와, 도시어부), also known as City Fisherman, is a South Korea variety show program on Channel A. Currently, the show consist of Lee Deok-hwa, Lee Kyung-kyu, Lee Soo-geun, Lee Tae-gon and Kim Jun-hyun.

The filming began in July 2017. Season 1 of the show was aired on Channel A starting September 7, 2017 and ended on September 9, 2019. It was distributed and syndicated by Channel A every Thursday at 23:00 (KST).

Season 2 of show started on December 19, 2019, and ended on February 4, 2021. It was aired on Channel A every Thursday at 21.00 (KST).

The end of Season 2 will make way for the planning of Season 3. Season 3 of show started on May 6, 2021 and ended on January 27, 2022. It was aired on Channel A every Thursday at 22.30 (KST).

On May 17, 2022, Channel A had announced the show will be renewing for a Season 4 that is slated to air in July 2022.

== Synopsis ==
This is a fishing entertainment program featuring the 2 MCs of the show (Lee Deok-hwa and Lee Kyung-kyu). On every episode, they also give celebrities who enjoy fishing the opportunity to visit beautiful, secret fishing spots and having bonding time. While on the show, celebrities also share useful fishing tips with viewers.

== Casts ==
=== Season 1 ===
- Lee Deok-hwa (Episode 1 – 107)
- Lee Kyung-kyu (Episode 1 – 107)
- Microdot (Note: Due to his controversy, he has since stepped down from all the shows he had been on.) (Episode 1 – 66)
- Jang Do-yeon (Episode 76 – 107)

=== Season 2 ===
- Lee Deok-hwa
- Lee Kyung-kyu
- Ji Sang-ryeol
- Lee Soo-geun
- Lee Tae-gon
- Kim Jun-hyun
- Park Jin-chul
- Park Byung-eun

=== Season 3 ===
- Lee Deok-hwa
- Lee Kyung-kyu
- Lee Soo-geun
- Lee Tae-gon
- Kim Jun-hyun
- Lee Know

== Ratings ==
In the ratings below, the highest rating for the show will be in red, and the lowest rating for the show will be in blue each year.

=== Season 1 ===
List of ratings in Season 1 (2017-2019)

| Ep. # | Original Airdate | TNmS Ratings | Nielsen Ratings |
| Ep. # | Original Airdate | Nationwide | |
|---|---|---|---|
| 1 | September 7, 2017 | 2.0% | 2.115% |
| 2 | September 14 | 2.0% | 1.679% |
| 3 | September 21 | 2.3% | 2.221% |
| 4 | September 28 | 3.1% | 2.910% |
| 5 | October 5 | 3.7% | 3.916% |
| 6 | October 12 | 2.6% | 3.013% |
| 7 | October 19 | 3.1% | 2.625% |
| 8 | October 26 | 2.7% | 2.676% |
| 9 | November 2 | 3.9% | 3.602% |
| 10 | November 9 | 3.7% | 3.743% |
| 11 | November 16 | 2.9% | 2.995% |
| 12 | November 23 | 3.9% | 4.061% |
| 13 | November 30 | 3.8% | 3.581% |
| 14 | December 7 | 3.6% | 3.953% |
| 15 | December 14 | 3.4% | 4.105% |
| 16 | December 21 | 4.0% | 4.422% |
| 17 | December 28 | 4.9% | 4.494% |
| 18 | January 4, 2018 | 5.0% | 4.817% |
| 19 | January 11 | 4.3% | 4.481% |
| 20 | January 18 | 4.7% | 4.548% |
| 21 | January 25 | 4.6% | 5.190% |
| 22 | February 1 | 5.2% | 4.967% |
| 23 | February 8 | 4.7% | 3.991% |
| 24 | February 15 | 3.8% | 3.937% |
| 25 | February 22 | 3.8% | 3.932% |
| 26 | March 1 | 4.5% | 3.904% |
| 27 | March 8 | 4.8% | 4.785% |
| 28 | March 15 | N/R | 4.843% |
| 29 | March 22 | N/R | 4.089% |
| 30 | March 29 | N/R | 3.837% |
| 31 | April 5 | N/R | 4.509% |
| 32 | April 12 | N/R | 4.945% |
| 33 | April 19 | N/R | 4.731% |
| 34 | April 26 | N/R | 3.798% |
| 35 | May 3 | N/R | 4.716% |
| 36 | May 10 | N/R | 4.115% |
| 37 | May 17 | N/R | 4.136% |
| 38 | May 24 | N/R | 3.260% |
| 39 | May 31 | N/R | 3.458% |
| 40 | June 7 | N/R | 3.876% |
| 41 | June 14 | N/R | 3.400% |
| 42 | June 21 | N/R | 2.973% |
| 43 | June 28 | N/R | 3.460% |
| 44 | July 5 | N/R | 4.478% |
| 45 | July 12 | N/R | 4.791% |
| 46 | July 19 | N/R | 4.715% |
| 47 | July 26 | N/R | 4.373% |
| 48 | August 2 | N/R | 4.617% |
| 49 | August 9 | N/R | 4.339% |
| 50 | August 16 | N/R | 4.153% |
| 51 | August 23 | N/R | 4.943% |
| 52 | August 30 | N/R | 5.305% |
| 53 | September 6 | N/R | 4.522% |
| 54 | September 13 | N/R | 4.430% |
| 55 | September 20 | N/R | 4.332% |
| 56 | September 27 | N/R | 4.021% |
| 57 | October 4 | N/R | 4.096% |
| 58 | October 11 | N/R | 4.136% |
| 59 | October 18 | N/R | 4.025% |
| 60 | October 25 | N/R | 3.766% |
| 61 | November 1 | N/R | 4.144% |
| 62 | November 8 | N/R | 4.020% |
| 63 | November 15 | N/R | 4.127% |
| 64 | November 22 | N/R | 4.057% |
| 65 | November 29 | N/R | 3.436% |
| 66 | December 6 | N/R | 3.453% |
| 67 | December 13 | N/R | 3.972% |
| 68 | December 20 | N/R | 3.890% |
| 69 | December 27 | N/R | 4.353% |
| 70 | January 4, 2019 | N/R | 3.924% |
| 71 | January 10 | N/R | 4.048% |
| 72 | January 17 | N/R | 3.924% |
| 73 | January 24 | N/R | 3.831% |
| 74 | January 31 | N/R | 3.948% |
| 75 | February 7 | N/R | 4.921% |
| 76 | February 14 | N/R | 4.590% |
| 77 | February 21 | N/R | 4.217% |
| 78 | February 28 | N/R | 3.832% |
| 79 | March 7 | N/R | 3.269% |
| 80 | March 14 | N/R | 3.212% |
| 81 | March 21 | N/R | 3.226% |
| 82 | March 28 | N/R | 3.134% |
| 83 | April 4 | N/R | 2.525% |
| 84 | April 11 | N/R | 2.958% |
| 85 | April 18 | N/R | 2.624% |
| 86 | April 25 | N/R | 2.274% |
| 87 | May 2 | N/R | 1.779% |
| 88 | May 9 | N/R | 3.173% |
| 89 | May 16 | N/R | 2.945% |
| 90 | May 23 | N/R | 2.657% |
| 91 | May 30 | N/R | 2.749% |
| 92 | June 6 | N/R | 2.735% |
| 93 | June 13 | N/R | 2.183% |
| 94 | June 20 | N/R | 4.534% |
| 95 | June 27 | N/R | 4.514% |
| 96 | July 4 | N/R | 4.384% |
| 97 | July 11 | N/R | 4.665% |
| 98 | July 18 | N/R | 4.014% |
| 99 | July 25 | N/R | 4.695% |
| 100 | August 1 | N/R | 4.124% |
| 101 | August 8 | N/R | 4.053% |
| 102 | August 15 | N/R | 4.478% |
| 103 | August 22 | N/R | 4.629% |
| 104 | August 29 | N/R | 4.098% |
| 105 | September 5 | N/R | 3.436% |
| 106 | September 12 | N/R | 2.551% |
| 107 | September 19 | N/R | 3.222% |

=== Season 2 ===
List of ratings in Season 2 (2019–2021)

| Ep. # | Original Airdate | Nielsen Ratings |
| Ep. # | Original Airdate | Nationwide |
|---|---|---|
| 1 | December 19, 2019 | 2.390% |
| 2 | December 26 | 2.197% |
| 3 | January 2, 2020 | 2.235% |
| 4 | January 9 | 1.499% |
| 5 | January 16 | 2.067% |
| 6 | January 23 | 1.999% |
| 7 | January 30 | 2.751% |
| 8 | February 6 | 2.639% |
| 9 | February 13 | 2.028% |
| 10 | February 20 | 1.692% |
| 11 | February 27 | 1.572% |
| 12 | March 5 | 2.555% |
| 13 | March 12 | 1.707% |
| 14 | March 19 | 2.863% |
| 15 | March 26 | 2.620% |
| 16 | April 2 | 2.926% |
| 17 | April 9 | 2.993% |
| 18 | April 23 | 3.019% |
| 19 | April 30 | 3.284% |
| 20 | May 7 | 3.183% |
| 21 | May 14 | 2.876% |
| 22 | May 21 | 3.137% |
| 23 | May 28 | 3.268% |
| 24 | June 4 | 3.104% |
| 25 | June 11 | 3.332% |
| 26 | June 18 | 3.512% |
| 27 | June 25 | 3.702% |
| 28 | July 2 | 3.539% |
| 29 | July 9 | 4.720% |
| 30 | July 16 | 3.285% |
| 31 | July 23 | 4.060% |
| 32 | July 30 | 3.328% |
| 33 | August 6 | 3.957% |
| 34 | August 13 | 3.892% |
| 35 | August 20 | 3.668% |
| 36 | August 27 | 3.680% |
| 37 | September 3 | 3.982% |
| 38 | September 10 | 3.780% |
| 39 | September 17 | 4.043% |
| 40 | September 24 | 3.413% |
| 41 | October 1 | 2.740% |
| 42 | October 8 | 3.244% |
| 43 | October 15 | 3.647% |
| 44 | October 22 | 3.204% |
| 45 | October 29 | 4.395% |
| 46 | November 5 | 3.464% |
| 47 | November 12 | 3.899% |
| 48 | November 19 | 4.451% |
| 49 | November 26 | 4.756% |
| 50 | December 3 | 3.300% |
| 51 | December 10 | 4.993% |
| 52 | December 17 | 3.108% |
| 53 | December 24 | 3.538% |
| 54 | December 31 | 3.098% |
| 55 | January 7, 2021 | 2.757% |
| 56 | January 14 | 2.824% |
| 57 | January 21 | 2.601% |
| 58 | January 28 | 3.228% |
| 59 | February 4 | 2.515% |

=== Season 3 ===
List of ratings in Season 3 (2021–2022)

| Ep. # | Original Airdate | Nielsen Ratings |
| Ep. # | Original Airdate | Nationwide |
|---|---|---|
| 1 | May 6, 2021 | 2.540% |
| 2 | May 13 | 2.394% |
| 3 | May 20 | 2.924% |
| 4 | May 27 | 2.851% |
| 5 | June 3 | 2.496% |
| 6 | June 10 | 2.646% |
| 7 | June 17 | 2.728% |
| 8 | June 24 | 3.040% |
| 9 | July 1 | 3.144% |
| 10 | July 8 | 2.969% |
| 11 | July 15 | 2.891% |
| 12 | July 22 | 3.269% |
| 13 | July 29 | 2.946% |
| 14 | August 5 | 3.324% |
| 15 | August 12 | 2.682% |
| 16 | August 19 | 2.410% |
| 17 | August 26 | 3.600% |
| 18 | September 2 | 3.003% |
| 19 | September 23 | 3.067% |
| 20 | September 30 | 3.070% |
| 21 | October 7 | 3.208% |
| 22 | October 14 | 2.429% |
| 23 | October 21 | 2.959% |
| 24 | October 28 | 2.585% |
| 25 | November 4 | 2.679% |
| 26 | November 11 | 2.874% |
| 27 | November 18 | 2.550% |
| 28 | November 25 | 2.171% |
| 29 | December 2 | 2.638% |
| 30 | December 9 | 2.597% |
| 31 | December 16 | 2.518% |
| 32 | December 23 | 2.403% |
| 33 | December 30 | 2.832% |
| 34 | January 6, 2022 | 3.206% |
| 35 | January 13 | 2.908% |
| 36 | January 20 | 2.838% |
| 37 | January 27 | 2.726% |
