= Golden Fish (TV series) =

Television series

- Promotional poster
- Also known as: Goldfish
- Hangul: 황금물고기
- Hanja: 黃金물고기
- RR: Hwanggeum mulgogi
- MR: Hwanggŭm mulkogi
- Genre: Melodrama; Romance
- Written by: Jo Eun-jung
- Directed by: Oh Hyun-chang; Joo Sung-woo
- Starring: Park Sang-won; Lee Tae-gon; Jo Yoon-hee; So Yoo-jin
- Country of origin: South Korea
- Original language: Korean
- No. of episodes: 133

Production
- Producer: Lee Dae-young
- Running time: 30 minutes

Original release
- Network: Munhwa Broadcasting Corporation
- Release: May 3 – November 11, 2010

Golden Fish (Korean: 황금물고기) is a 2010 South Korean drama television series starring Park Sang-won, Lee Tae-gon, Jo Yoon-hee, and So Yoo-jin. The daily drama aired on MBC on Mondays to Fridays at 20:15 from May 3 to November 11, 2010 for 133 episodes.

== Plot ==
Lee Tae-young has long been hardened from growing up in an unloving family. The only person whom he can open his heart to is his stepsister Han Ji-min, but their love is tested by his stepmother's manipulations and the cruelty of fate.

== Cast and characters ==
- Park Sang-won as Moon Jung-ho

He's the chairman of the Jungin Medical Foundation and also the director of a prestigious general hospital while carrying on his duties as a university president. In the professional arena, he is a calculating person who makes management decisions without any emotion, but in his personal life, he displays a liberal and free-spirited streak. He is a natural charmer and attracts many ladies but he always holds back from falling in love. However, his outlook on life is turned upside down after he meets the young and comely ballerina, Ji-min.

- Lee Tae-gon as Lee Tae-young

A doctor. He's a handsome man and talented surgeon. He lost his mother when he was seven years old and his father was never a part of his life since he was born. So he was taken in by Kyung-san and grew up with his family. He doesn't open up to people easily but he is very tender towards Ji-min.

- Jo Yoon-hee as Han Ji-min

A prima ballerina. Like her father, she's a warmhearted person and very attractive. For 23 years, she only loved Tae-young but he breaks her heart by abruptly leaving her life. She loses her father, her dreams and the man she loved all at once. Amidst this turmoil, she becomes a changed person.

- So Yoo-jin as Moon Hyun-jin

Jung-ho's daughter and Tae-young's wife. Her first husband died while she was pregnant with their baby and she became a single mom all of a sudden. She falls in love with Tae-young who operated on her ailing daughter Seo-yeon. She asks Tae-young out and they eventually get married. But she constantly worries that he'll leave her one day.

=== Han family ===
- Kim Yong-gun as Han Kyung-san
- Youn Yuh-jung as Jo Yoon-hee
- Park Ki-woong as Han Kang-min
- Guzal Tursunova as Rebecca
- Seo Seung-man as Jo Yoon-woo

=== Moon family ===
- Jung Hye-sun as Mrs. Kang (Jung-ho's mother)
- Lee Il-hwa as Moon Jung-won (Jung-ho's sister)
- Lee Hae-woo as Moon Seok-jin (Jung-ho's son)
- Kang Ye-seo as Moon Seo-yeon (Hyun-jin's daughter)

=== Extended cast ===
- Kim Bo-yeon as Lee Se-rin
- Hwang Seung-eon as Yoon Myung-ji
- Lee Hae-in as Seo Joo-hee
- Yoon Eun-young as Hyo-won (Ji-min's friend)
- Lee Hyung-suk as Yook Gong-dol (Jung-ho's driver/assistant)
- Kim Soo-hyun as Miss Hwang (Mrs. Kang's secretary)
- Choi Su-rin as Park Ji-hye (Tae-young's deceased mother)
- Kim Ji-young as Gong-dol's grandmother
- Heo Tae-hee as Hyun-ji's date
- Ha Soo-ho as Kyung Ho-won
- Shin Jong-hoon
- Lee Do-yeop

== Awards and nominations ==
2010 MBC Drama Awards

- PD Award: Lee Tae-gon
- Golden Acting Award, Actor in a Serial Drama: Park Sang-won
- Golden Acting Award, Actress in a Serial Drama: Kim Bo-yeon
- Best New Actress: Jo Yoon-hee
- Writer of the Year: Jo Eun-jung
- Nominated - Top Excellence Award, Actor: Lee Tae-gon
- Nominated - Excellence Award, Actress: So Yoo-jin

2010 International Emmys

- Shortlisted for Best Telenovela

== International broadcast ==
It aired in Vietnam on Hanoi Television on April 17, 2012, called Cá vàng
