= Choi Bool-am =

South Korean actor (1940–2026)

Choi Young-han
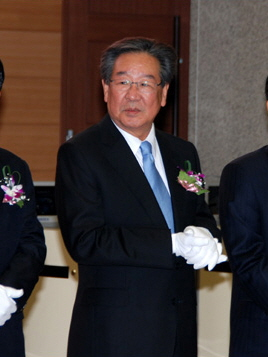
- Choi in November 2008
- Born: 15 June 1940; Incheon, Korea, Empire of Japan
- Died: 29 October 2026 (aged 86); Seoul, South Korea
- Occupations: Actor; academic; television presenter
- Years active: 1970–2025
- Honours: Eungwan Order of Cultural Merit (2014); Geumgwan Order of Cultural Merit (2026, posthumous)

Korean name
- Hangul: 최영한
- Hanja: 崔英漢
- RR: Choe Yeonghan
- MR: Ch'oe Yŏnghan

Stage name
- Hangul: 최불암
- Hanja: 崔佛岩
- RR: Choe Bulam
- MR: Ch'oe Puram

Choi Young-han (Korean: 최불암; 15 June 1940 – 29 October 2026), known professionally as Choi Bool-am, was a South Korean actor, television presenter and academic. He was known for hosting the documentary programme Korean Cuisine and Dining and long running MBC series Circle Inspector (1971-1988) and Country Diaries (1980-2002).

== Early life ==
Choi was born in the neighborhood of Geumgok-dong, Dong District, Incheon, Korea, Empire of Japan in 1940. He was of the Haeju Choe clan. Choi was the only son to his father Choi Cheol, a business man and film proucer, and his mother Lee Myeong-suk, who was a daughter of a royal pharmacist of the Korean Empire. Choi Cheol suddenly died when Choi was 8 years old and entered Sinheung Elementary School in Incheon.

He moved to Seoul to attend Jungang Middle School. Choi was drawn to theater as he entered a theater club at Jungang High School. He gained directing experience while at Seorabeol Art College (which has since merged into the now Chung-Ang University). He entered Hanyang University in 1960.

== Career ==
Before graduation, Choi starred in several plays including Hamlet. He was recruited as a KBS TV actor in 1966, and entered stardom with the role of Kim Jong-seo in the drama series, Prince Suyang. His stage name Choi Bool-am was given to him by his uncle, who took the name from Mt. Buram. He played old man roles in films during the 1970s. His breakout role was Park Young-han in MBC long running show Circle Inspector (1971-1988) which established him as national icon, and he also starred in TV dramas including Princess Hours (2006). Choi was also the host for Korean Cuisine and Dining, a food travelogue series on food of Korea and the Korean diaspora.He made his final appearance in 2024 for Chief Detective 1958, for which he reprised his role as an older Park Yong-han. At the time, he was last surviving cast member of Circle Inspector.

== Personal life and death ==
In 1970, he married Kim Min-ja, the sister of actress Lee So-won. They had two children.

He was Catholic and performed philanthropic actions for children for 45 years.

Choi died in a hospital in Seoul on 29 October 2026, while recovering from spinal disc surgery he received back in March. He was 86.

Politicians and actors expressed condolences, including South Korean President Lee Jae-myung.

== Filmography ==
*Note; the whole list is referenced.

=== Film ===
Year	Title	Role
1967	Light and Shadow	
1968	The Wings of Lee Sang	
1968	Vega	
1968	Female Bandits	
1969	Madam Freedom	
1969	Eunuch	
1970	Scamp in Hanyang	
1970	The Evening Bell	
1970	Friendship of Hope	
1970	What's the Use of Crying	
1970	Nobody Knows	
1970	The Sun Never Gets Old	
1971	A Student of Life	
1971	Say Goodbye Like a Man	
1971	Burning Revenge	
1971	I'm Your Family	
1971	What Happened That Night	
1972	An Jung-Geun, the Patriot	
1972	One to One	
1972	A Wonderful Life	
1972	Looking for Sons and Daughters	
1973	Testimony	
1973	Married on the Bull	
1973	Father	
1973	An Age of Maiden	
1973	Young Ones	
1973	With My Love, Forever	
1973	Non Gae, the Kisaeng	
1974	Blue Jeans	
1974	The Unforgettables	
1974	Hwannyeo	
1974	Transgression	
1974	Gypsy of the Heart	
1974	A White Handkerchief	
1975	The 49th Day After Death	
1975	End of an Affair	
1975	Lust	
1975	Red Shoes	
1975	A Spy Remaining Behind	
1975	Yeong-ja's Heydays	
1975	Chun-Ja's Love Story	
1975	Chang-Su's Heydays	
1976	Wang Sib Ri, My Hometown	
1976	Kan-Nan	
1976	Graduating Students	
1976	Family	
1976	Rocking Horse and a Girl	
1976	Mother	
1976	Love of Blood Relations	
1976	I Really Have a Dream	
1976	A Byegone Romance	
1976	Counting Stars in a Night Sky	
1977	I Really Like You	
1977	Arirang-A	
1978	King Sejong, the Great	Hwang Hŭi
1978	Unsettling Afternoon	
1978	The Gate	
1979	Run Towards Tomorrow	
1979	Thoughtless Mo-mo	
1979	Romance Gray	
1980	Good Windy Day	
1980	The Last Witness	
1980	Son of a Man	
1980	Be Courageous Man-seok	
1981	Three Times Each for Short and Long Ways	
1981	Whale Island Escapade	
1982	Chun-hi	
1986	Gilsoddeum	
1987	Our Joyful Young Days	
1988	Dangerous Scent Married Couple	
1990	Broken Children	
2004	Sympathy for Us	Byeok-dol
2005	She's on Duty	Chief Prosecutor
2012	Monk Beopjeong's Chair	Narrator
2013	Buddha: The Great Departure	Narrator (dubbing)
2025	April Fireworks	Narrator

=== Television series ===
Year	Title	Role
1971–89	Chief Inspector	Lieutenant Park Yeonghan
1981–82	1st Republic	Syngman Rhee
1997–98	You and I	Park Jae-chul
2000	More Than Love	Kim Han-bong
2002	Sunlight	Choi Myung-ho
2004–05	The Age of Heroes	Cameo
2005–06	Sweet Spy	Choi Beom-gu
2006	Princess Hours	Emperor Seongjo
2006	Love Truly	Jang Min-ho
2008	Gourmet	Oh Seung-gun
2009	Smile, You	Kang Man-bok
2011–12	Heaven's Garden	Jung Boo-sik
2012	Road No. 1	Tae-ho (older)
2012	Happy Ending	Doo-soo's father
2014	Glorious Day	Kim Chul-soo
2018	Life on Mars	Chief Inspector (cameo)
2018	Goodbye to Goodbye	Seo Young-hee's father
2024	Chief Detective 1958	Old Park Yeonghan

== Ambassadorship ==
- Ambassador of Public Relations to Seoul (2023)

== Accolades ==
=== Award and nomination ===
Award and nomination won by Choi
Year	Award ceremony	Category	Nominee / work	Result	Ref.
1974	the 10th Baeksang Arts Awards	Best TV Acting	한백년(MBC)	Won	
1975	the 11th Baeksang Arts Awards	Favorite TV Actor selected by readers	Choi Bool-am	Won	
1978	the 17th Grand Bell Awards	Best Supporting Actor	세종대왕	Won	
1978,	the 14th Baeksang Arts Awards	Excellent TV Acting	당신(MBC)	Won	
1979	the 18th Grand Bell Awards	Best Actor	달려라 만석아	Won	
1980	the 1st Korean Film Critics Association Awards	Best Actor	최후의 증인	Won	
2008	the 3rd Seoul International Drama Awards	Star Hall of Fame	Choi Bool-am	Won	
2022	the 15th Korea Drama Awards	Achievement Award	Choi Bool-am	Won	
2025	52nd Korea Broadcasting Prizes	Best Host	Choi Bool-am	Won	

=== State honors ===
List of State Honour(s)
State	Award Ceremony	Year	Honor	Ref.
South Korea	Korean Popular Culture and Arts Awards (Note: Since 2010 Honors are given at the Korean Popular Culture and Arts Awards, arranged by the Korea Creative Content Agency and hosted by the Ministry of Culture, Sports and Tourism.)	2014	Bogwan Order of Cultural Merit	

=== Listicles ===
Name of publisher, year listed, name of listicle, and placement
Publisher	Year	List	Placement	Ref.
KBS	2023	The 50 people who made KBS shine	45th	
Sisa Journal (Note: Sisa Journal Next Generation Leader-Society was founded by Sisa Journal in 2008.)	2015	Most Influential Person — Broadcasting & Entertainment	4th	
Sisa Journal	2019	Most Influential Person — Broadcasting & Entertainment	9th	

== Election results ==
Year	Elections	Constituency	Political party	Votes (%)	Results
1992	14th National Assembly General Election	National (5th)	UNP	3,574,419 (17.37%)	Elected
1996	15th National Assembly General Election	Yeongdeungpo B (Seoul)	NKP	33,020 (32.49%)	Defeated (2nd)
