= Do Kum-bong =

South Korean actress (1930–2009)

- Do in 1960
- Born: August 27, 1930; Taikyū, Keishōhoku Province, Chōsen, Japan (today Taegu, South Korea)
- Died: June 3, 2009 (aged 78)
- Occupation: Actress

Korean name
- Hangul: 정옥순
- Hanja: 鄭玉順
- RR: Jeong Oksun
- MR: Chŏng Oksun

Stage name
- Hangul: 도금봉, 지일화
- Hanja: 都琴峰, 地一華
- RR: Do Geumbong, Ji Ilhwa
- MR: To Kŭmbong, Chi Irhwa

Do Kum-bong (Korean: 도금봉; August 27, 1930 – June 3, 2009) was a South Korean actress whose fame peaked in the 1950s and 1960s. She starred in more than 283 films.

== Filmography ==
Year	English title	Korean title	Romanization	Role	Director
1997	Trio	3인조	Sam<3>-injo		Park Chan-wook (박찬욱)
1986	Eunuch	내시	Naesi		Lee Doo-yong (이두용)
1981	Son of Man	사람의 아들	Salam-ui adeul		Yu Hyun-mok (유현목)
1980	Weak Mind	마음 약해서	Ma-eum-yaghaeseo		Shim Woo-seob (심우섭)
	A Man Who Died Daily	매일 죽는 남자	Maeil jukneun namja		Lee Won-se (이원세)
	Scholar Yul-gok and His Mother Shin Sa-im-dang	율곡과 신사임당	Yulgok-gwa shin saimdang		Jung Jin-woo (정진우)
1979	The Twelve Boarders	12인의 하숙생	Sib-i-in-ui Hasuksaeng		Seok Rae-myeong (석래명)
	The Root of Love	사랑의 뿌리	Salang-ui ppuli		Kang Dae-jin (감대진)
	A Girl Named Jegal Maeng-sun	제갈맹순이	Jegal Maengsun-i		Kim Eun-cheong (김응천)
	Do You Know Kotsuni?	꽃순이를 아시나요	Kkochsun-ileul asina-yo		Jeong In-yeop (정인엽)
	Sound of Laughter	웃음 소리	Us-eumsoli		Kim Soo-yong (김수용)
	The Home of Stars	별들의 고향	Byeoldeul-ui gohyang		Lee Jang-ho (이장호)
	Flower Shoes	꽃신	Kkochsin		Go Yeong-nam (고영남)
	With My Older Brother and, Sister	오빠하고 누나하고	Oppahago nunahago		Lee Sang-eon (이상언)
	I Love Only You	당신만을 사랑해	Dangsinman-eul salanghae		Moon Yeo-song (문여송)
	Police Story	경찰관	Gyeongchalgwan		Lee Doo-yong (이두용)
	Wanderer	산골 나그네	Sangolnageune		Moon Yeo-song (문여송)
1977	A Song Dedicated to Wife	아내에게 바치는 노래	Anae-ege bachineun nolae		Choi In-hyun (최인현)
	Arirang-A	아리랑아	Alilang-a		Jeong In-yeop (정인엽)
	Two Minus Three	둘 빼기 셋	Dul ppaegi ses		Lee Sung-min (이성민)
	The Ascension of Han-ne	한네의 승천	Han-ne-ui seung-cheon		Ha Gil-jong (하길종)
	Mother	어머니	Eomeoni		Im Won-sik (임원식)
1976	Pleasure of Life	춘풍연풍	Chunpung-yeonpung		Lee Shin-myung (이신명)
	Manless Street	여자들만 사는 거리	Yeojadeulman saneun geoli		Kim Ho-seon (김호선)
	Girls from Scratch	맨주먹의 소녀들	Manjumeog-ui sonyeodeul		Kim Young-hyo (김영효)
	Wild Forest	야성의 숲	Yaseong-ui sup		Lee Sung-min (이성민)
	Why Do You Ask My Past?	과거는 왜 물어	Gwageoneun wae mul-eo		Jo Kwan-su (조관수)
	Kan-Nan	간난이	Gannan-i		Park Tae Won (박태원)
	Family	가족	Gajog		Lee Hyuk-soo (이혁수)
	Unfortunate Woman	비녀	Binyeo		Lee Shin-myung (이신명)
1975	Yeong-ja's Heydays	영자의 전성시대	Yeongja-ui jeonseongsidae		Kim Ho-seon (김호선)
	Chang-Su's Heydays	창수의 전성시대	Changsu-ui jeonseongsidae		Kim Sa-gyeom (김사겸)
	You Can Borrow My Love	사랑을 빌려 드립니다	Salang-eul billyeo deulibnida		Kim Young-hyo (김영효)
	Chun-ja's Love Story	춘자의 사랑 이야기	Chunja-ui salang-i-yagi		Lee Yu-Seop (이유섭)
1974	Silver Beard	하얀 수염	Ha-yan su-yeom		Park No-sik (박노식)
	The Land	토지	Toji		Kim Soo-yong (김수용)
	Three Bothers	아들 3형제	Adeul Samhyeongje		Lee Hyung-pyo (이형표)
	Mr. Bull	소띠 아저씨	Sotti-ajeossi		No Jin-seob (노진섭)
	College Girl Maidservant	여대생 가정부	Yeodaesaeng gajeongbu		Park Yun-gyo (박윤교)
1973	The General in Red Robes	홍의 장군	Hong-uijanggun		Lee Doo-yong (이두용)
	An Echo of an Angel	천사의 메아리	Cheonsa-ui me-ali		Kim Eung-cheon (김응천)
	Night Flight	야간비행	Yaganbihaeng		Kwak Jeong-hwan (곽정환)
	Suspended Sentence	집행유예	Jibhaeng-yu-ye		Park No-sik (박노식)
	Three Days of Their Reign	삼일천하	Sam-ilcheonha		Shin Sang-ok (신상옥)
1972	Sim Cheong	효녀 심청	Hyonyeo Cheong-i		Shin Sang-ok (신상옥)
	An Odd General	별난 장군	Byeolnanjanggun		Byeon Jang-ho (변장호)
	A Court Lady	궁녀	Gungnyeo		Shin Sang-ok (신상옥)
1971	Beautiful Korea	아름다운 팔도강산	Aleumda-un paldogangsan		Kang Hyuk (강혁)
	Twelve Women	열두 여인	Yeoldu yeo-in		Ahn Hyeon-cheol (안현철)
	Rainbow Over the Island	낙도의 무지개	Nagdo-ui mujigae		Jeon Ji-soo (전지수)
	My Sister's Regrets	누나의 한	Nuna-ui han		Lee Yu-Seop (이유섭)
	First Love		Sonyeo-ui cheossalang		
	Why Do You Abandon Me		Naleul beolisinaikka		
	Madame Impetuous		Geugseongbu-in		
	A Woman's Battleground		Yeo-injeonjang		
	Bakdal Ridge of Tears		Nunmul-ui Bagdaljae		
	Revenge of a Mother		Eomma-ui han		
	One-armed Master of the Wild		Hwang-ya-ui woepal-i		
	Men vs. Women		Namdae-yeo		
	A Male Housemaid		Namjasigmo		
	When We Share Pain Together		Neo-wa naega apeum-eul gat-i haess-eul ttae		
1970	Pilnyeo		Pilnyeo		
	The Little Bridegroom's Return		Dol-a-on agisinlang		
	Miss Chicken		Misseu chondalg		
	Agony of Man		Namjaneun goelo-wo		
	Fair Lady of Tapgol		Tabgol-assi		
	White Rose		Baekjangmi		
	The Magical Sword of White Skeleton Pass		Baekgollyeong-ui Mageom		
	Fine Destiny		Naepalja-ga Sangpalja		
	A Fierce Animal		Maengsu		
	Newly Married		Makdongi Sinhon 10 gaewol		
	Day Dream		Janghanmong		
	Women of Yi-Dynasty		Ijo Yeoin Janhogsa		
	Rock of Crown Prince		Taejabawi		
	Sons-in-Law		Paldo Sa-wi		
	Top Secretary		Teugdeung Biseo		
	Destiny of My Load		Jeonha Eodiro Gasinaikka		
	Enuch		Naesi		
	Escaping Shanghai		Sanghae Talchul		
	Sorry to Give You Trouble		Sinse Jom Jijagu-yo		
	Beauty of Hot Spring		Minyeo Oncheon		
	Installment Secretary		Wolbu Nambiseo		
	The Second Wife		Huchwidaeg		
	Three Sisters of House Maid		Singmo Samhyeongje		
	A Man and a Gisaeng		Namjawa Gisaeng		
	Maternal Affection		Ibyeorui Mojeong		
	Vice-President		Bu-gakha		
	Mr. Gu at Sajik Village		Sajikgol Guseobang		
	Romance Mama		Romaenseu Mama		
	Shaded Love		Geuneuljin Sunjeong		
	Childish Daughter-in-law		Pal-pun Myeoneuri		
	Baldheaded Bachelor		Daemeori Chonggak		
	A Man of Great Strength: Im Ggyeok-jeong		Cheonha Jangsa, Im Ggyeok-jeong		
	Potato		Gamja		
	A Young Gisaeng		Hwacho Gisaeng		
	Childish Son-in-law		Palpuni Sawi		
	A Bride on the Second Floor		I-Cheungjip Saedaek		
1968	Femme Fatale, Jang Hee-bin		Yohwa, Jang Hee-bin		
	Goodbye Dad		Abba An-nyeong		
	Wrong Target		Beonjisuga Teulryeotneyo		
	Eunuch		Naesi		
	Princess Guseul		Guseul Gongju		
	Feeling of Love		Aesim		
	Salt Pond		Sujeonjidae		
	Mother is Strong				
	Crossing the Teary Hill of Bakdaljae		Ulgo Neomneun Bakdaljae		
	A Male Housekeeper		Namja Singmo		
	Stars in My Heart		Byeora Nae Gaseume		
	Sweetheart		Jeongdeun nim		
	Your Name		Geudae Ireumeun		
	The Life of a Woman		Yeoja-ui Ilsaeng		
	Journey into the Heart		Maeumui Yeoro		
	From Earth to Eternity		Jisang-eseo Yeong-euro		
	Madame Jet		Jeteu Buin		
	Female Power		Chimabaram		
	A Public Cemetery of Wol-ha		Wolhaui Gongdongmyoji		
	Seed Money		Jongjadon		
	When Bucketwheet Flowers Blossom		Memilkkot Pil Muryeop		
	Kong-Jwi Pat-jwi		Kongjwi patjwi		
	Bachelor Governor		Chonggak Wonnim		
	Seoul Is Full		Seoureun Manwonida		
	I Hate Men		Namjaneun Sireo		
	Tourist Train		Gwan-gwang Yeolcha		
	I Am Not Lonely		Oeropji Anta		
	A Heavenly Peach Flower		Cheondohwa		
	Injo Restoration		Injobanjeong		
	The Queen Moonjeong		Munjeong-wanghu		
1967	Flame in the Valley		Sanbul		
	Five Minutes before Curfew		Tonggeum Obunjeon		
1967	Why a Cuckoo Cries		Dugyeonsae Uneun Sayeon		
	The World is Chaos		Sesangeun Yojigyeong		
	Prosecutor Min and a Female Teacher		Min Geomsa-wa Yeo-seonsang		
	The Horizon is Silent		Jipyeongseoneun Mari Eopda		
	A Chinese Restaurant in Front of a Station		Yeokjeonab Junggukjib		
	Red Ants		Bulgaemi		
	A Neckless Beauty		Mokeomneun Minyeo		
	Salsali, You Didn't Know		Salsali Mollatji		
	Sell Your Life		Saengmyeongeul Pan Sanai		
	Father and Mrs. Pyeongyang		Appawa Pyeongyangdaek		
	The Fountain for the Woman		Yeoja-ui Saemteo		
	The Lady of Honor		Jeonggyeong Bu-in		
	Beauty Searching Authorities		Chaehongsa		
	Every Dog Has His Day		Jwigumeong-edo Byeotddeulnal Itda		
	The Scarlet Skirt		Juhong Skeoteu		
	Dad, Please Return Home		Appa Dorawayo		
	Farewell, Sorrow		Seulpeumiyeo Jal Itgeora		
1965	A Devilish Homicide		Sal-inma		
	The Wild Chrysanthemum		Deulgukhwa		
	The Great Sokgulam Cave Temple		Dae Seoggul-am		
	Hwang, Man of Wealth at Mapo		Mapo Saneun Hwangbuja		
	Hwalbindang		Hwalbindang		
1965	Lee Seong-gye King Taejo		Taejo Lee Seonggye		
	Dating Business		Cheongchun Sa-eop		
	Indecent Behavior		Juchaekbagaji		
	The Life in the Red Figures		Jeokjainsaeng		
	The Postman of Love		Sarang-ui Baedalbu		
	Seaman Park		Madoroseu Park		
	The Brave Woman		Yeojangbu		
1964	Deaf Samryongi		Beongeori Samryongi		
	Her Majesty Yeonghwa		Yeonghwa Mama		
	The Headwoman of Pal Tong and Pal Ban		Paltong Palban Yeobanjang		
	The Teacher with Ten Daughters		Sipjamae Seonsaeng		
	Queen Jinseong		Jinseong-yeowang		
1964	Extra Human Being		Ing-yeo Ingan		
	The Lost Sun		Ireobeorin Taeyang		
	The Beauty Murder Case in Bath		Yoktang-ui Minyeo Sageon		
	Prince Suyang and Mt. Baekdu		Suyanggwa Baekdusan		
	The Meaning to Plant a Phoenix Tree Is		Byeogodong Simeun Tteuseun		
	Princess Snow White		Baekseolgongju		
	The Port Sea Gulls Sing a Song		Galmaegi Uneun Hanggu		
	Are All Potbellied People Presidents?		Baeman naomyeon sajang-inya		
	The Heartbreaking Story		Danjanglok		
	What Is More Valuable than Life		Moksumboda Deohan Geot		
	Just Watch What We Do and See		Dugoman Bose-yo		
	An Aristocrat's Love Affair		Donbaram Nimbaram		
	Hundred Years' Enmity		Baengnyeonhan		
	A Reluctance Prince		Ganghwadoryeong		
	The Masked Prince		Bongmyeondaegun		
	The Fiancee		Yakhonnyeo		
	King's Secret Agent		Mapaewa Geom		
	The Ruffians		Bulhandang		
	A Bridegroom from a Grave		Mudeomeseo Na-on Sillang		
	A Stubborn Guy		Onggojip		
	The Twelve Nyang Life		Yeoldunyangjjari Insaeng		
	Cheongwannyeo		Cheongwannyeo		
	The Housemaid's Confession		Hanyeo-ui Gobaek		
	The Wandering Troupe		Yurang Geugjang		
	The Gentlemen Like Something New		Sinsaneun Saegeoseul Joahanda		
	A Happy Businesswoman		Ttosuni		
	The Heaven and the Hell		Cheongukkwa Ji-ok		
	Ms. Wal-sun		Walsun-ajimae		
	For My Husband		Mangbuseok		
	The Rose Life		Jangmikkot Insaeng		
	A Wanderer		Juyucheonha		
	Red Roses are Gone		Bulgeun Jangmineun Jida		
	Family Meeting		Gajog Hoe-ui		
	Tyrant Yeonsan		Pokgun Yeonsan		
	Yang Kuei-Fei, a Destructive Beauty		Cheonha-ilsaek Yang Gwibi		
	Even Though I Die		Moksumeul Geolgo		
	Women Rule		Yeoin Cheonha		
	Don't Break Damaged Reeds		Sang-han Galdaereul Kkeokjimara		
	Farewell to My Adolescence		Sachungi-yeo Annyeong		
	And Love as You Want		Maeum-daero Sarang Hago		
	A Man from Tokyo		Donggyeongseo On Sanai		
	New Wife		Saedaek		
	A Sad Cry		Bulleodo Daedab-eomneun Ireumi-yeo		
	Swordsman and Love		Geompung-yeonpung		
	The Story of Sim Cheong		Dae-Sim Cheong-jeon		
	Lonely and Miserable		Busandaek		
	Baekbaek Religious Fact		Baekbaekgyo		
	A Petty Middle Manager		Samdeung Gwajang		
	Under the Sky of Seoul		Seoul-ui Jibungmit		
	A Bar without Address		Beonji-eomneun Jmak		
	Love Against All Odds		Pacheon-neomeo Haedanghwa		
1961	The Houseguest and My Mother	사랑방 손님과 어머니	Sarangbang Sonnimgwa Eomeoni		
1961	A Flower of Evil		Ag-ui Kkot		
1961	Prince Yeonsan		Yeonsan-gun		
	Seong Chun-hyang		Seong Chun-hyang		
	Evergreen Tree		Sangnoksu		
	An Upstart		Gu Bong-seo-ui Byeorakbuja		
	Iljimae the Chivalrous Robber		Uijeok Iljimae		
	Princess Ok-ryeon and Hwalbindang		Okryeongongju-wa hwalbindang		
	A Romantic Papa		Lomaenseuppappa		
	Have I Come to Cry?		Ullyeogo naega wassdeonga		
	A Youth Garden		Cheongchunhwa-won		
	Come Back, My Bride!		Sinbu-yeo dol-a-ola		
	Your Voice		Geudae mogsori		
	Over the Hill		Jeo eondeog-eul neom-eoseo		
	A Daughter		Ttal		
	Through a Darkness		Amheug-eul ttulhgo		
	As You Please		Jemeosdaelo		
	A Drifting Story		Pyoludo		
	A Forget-me-not		Mulmangcho		
	The Day Without Tomorrow		Naeireomneun Geunal		
	A White Pearl		Baekjinju		
	Sorrow of Twilight		Hwanghonui Aesang		
	The Romantic Train		Nangmannyeolcha		
	An Inn		Yeoinsuk		
	A Vanished Dream		Kkumeun Sarajigo		
	Affection and Apathy		Yujeongmujeong		
	Prince Mi-Reuk		Wangja Mireuk		
	A Necklace of Reminiscence		Chueogui Mokgeori		
	Three Brides		Saminui Sinbu		
	Terms of Marriage		Gyeolhonjogeon		
	Far Away from Home		Tahyangsari		
	Mother		Eomeoni		
1959	Even the Clouds Are Drifting		Gureumeun Heulleodo		
	Yu Gwan-Sun		Yu Gwan-sun		
	Before a Love is Gone		Sarangi Gagi Jeone		
	Dongsimcho		Dongsimcho		
	Independence Association and young Lee Seung-man	독립협회와 청년 이승만	Dongniphyeophoewa Cheongnyeon Lee Seung-man		Shin Sang-ok (신상옥)
	In Every Nights and Dreams	밤마다 꿈마다	Bammada Kkummada		Lee Sa-ra (이사라)
	Sunshine Again	다시 찾는 양지	Dasi Chajeun Yangji		An Hyun-chul (안현철)
	The Flower	화심	Hwasim		Shin Kyung-gyun (신경균)
	Returned Lover	그대는 돌아왔건만	Geudaeneun dol-a-wassgeonman		Jo Jung-ho (조정호)
	Forever With You	그대와 영원히	Geudae-wa yeong-wonhi		Yu Hyun-mok (유현목)
	The Secret	별만이 아는 비밀	Byeolman-i aneun bimil		Lee Sun-kyung (이선경)
	Joy and Sorrow	웃어야할까 울어야할까	Useo-ya halkka Ul-eo-ya halkka		Shin Hyun-ho (신현호)
	The Hill with a Zelkova Tree	느티나무 있는 언덕	Neutinamu inneun eondeog		Choi Hoon (최훈)
1957	The Twilight Train	황혼열차	Hwanghon-yeolcha		Kim Ki-young (김기영)
	Hwang Jin-i	황진이	Hwang Jin-i		Jo Keung-ha (조긍하)

== Awards ==
- 1963 2nd Grand Bell Awards : Best Actress for New Wife (Saedaek)
- 1972 11th Grand Bell Awards : Best Supporting Actress for When a Little Dream Blooms...
- 1974 13th Grand Bell Awards : Best Supporting Actress for The Earth
