= Fly High Run Far =

- Theatrical poster for Fly High Run Far (1991)
- Hangul: 개벽
- Hanja: 開闢
- RR: Gaebyeok
- MR: Kaebyŏk
- Directed by: Im Kwon-taek
- Written by: Han Yong-su; Kim Jin-moon
- Produced by: Han Yong-su; Kim Jin-moon
- Starring: Lee Deok-hwa
- Cinematography: Jung Il-sung
- Edited by: Park Soon-duk
- Music by: Shin Byung-ha
- Distributed by: Chun Wu Films Co., Ltd.
- Release date: September 21, 1991
- Running time: 146 minutes
- Country: South Korea
- Language: Korean
- Box office: $0

Fly High Run Far (Korean: 개벽; RR: Gaebyeok) is a 1991 South Korean historical drama film directed by Im Kwon-taek. It was chosen as Best Film at the Grand Bell Awards.

== Plot ==
A film about Choe Si-hyeong, a leader of the Donghak Peasant Revolution of late 19th-century Korea.

This film revolves around the life of Choi Shi-hyong, head of the religious sect, Chondogyo, in the latter part of the Joseon Dynasty. He is the subject of a harassment campaign by the authorities. In 1864, Choi Jeh-woo, the reformist and founder of the Chondogyo sect is executed on charges of "deluding the world and deceiving the people". in the wake of Choi’s death, His successor Choi Shi-hyong, receives a strong groundswell of support. He then finds himself the target of harassment by the court. He is separated from his family and goes into hiding in a hermitage in the Taeback Mountains. With the belief that his wife is dead, Choi burns the tablet delicated to her and flees to an even more remote part of the mountains.

== Cast ==
- Lee Deok-hwa as Hae-weol, Choe Si-hyeong
- Lee Hye-young as Hae-weol's Wife
- Kim Myung-gon as Jeon Bong-jun
- Park Ji-hun as Kang-su
- Lee Suk-koo as Pan-ok
- Choi Dong-joon as Gye-dong
- Kim Gil-ho as Su-un
- Kim Ki-ju as Lee Pil-jye

== Bibliography ==
- Fly High, Run Far at the Busan International Film Festival
- "Kaebyeok". The Complete Index to World Film.
- 개벽. Cine21 (in Korean).

Preceded by Passion Portrait	Grand Bell Awards for Best Film; 1992	Succeeded by Seopyeonje
