= A Devilish Homicide =

- Theatrical poster
- Hangul: 살인마
- Hanja: 殺人魔
- RR: Sarinma
- MR: Sarinma
- Directed by: Lee Yong-min
- Written by: Lee Yong-min
- Produced by: Park Ui-sun
- Starring: Lee Ye-chun; Do Kum-bong; Jeong Ae-ran; Lee Bin-hwa
- Cinematography: Hong Jong-mun
- Edited by: Jang Hyeon-su
- Music by: Kim Yong-hwan
- Distributed by: Jeil Films Co., Ltd.
- Release date: August 12, 1965
- Running time: 93 minutes
- Country: South Korea
- Language: Korean

A Devilish Homicide (Korean: 살인마; RR: Sarinma) is a 1965 South Korean film written and directed by Lee Yong-min. It tells the story of a woman, who, having been murdered by her jealous cousin and mother-in-law, returns as a spirit to take vengeance on her killers. The film's English title is sometimes given as A Devilish Murder or A Bloodthirsty Killer. The Korean title is interpreted as Murderer or Murderous Fiend. It was released on DVD in 2007.

== Plot ==
Family man Lee Shi-mak arrives at an art exhibition only to find the building empty, and is shocked to find a portrait of his ex-wife, Ae-ja, whom he has not seen for ten years. Shi-mak takes a taxi home, but is taken against his will to a house in the countryside. There he meets an artist, Park Joon-chul, who gives him the portrait of Ae-ja and pleads with him to take it and leave. At the stroke of midnight, he becomes hysterical and hides Shi-mak under the bed, who watches as a woman stabs the artist in the back. After she has gone, Shi-mak flees with the painting, only to find the unconscious body of Ae-ja, looking as she did ten years earlier. He takes her to his friend Dr. Park, who, perplexed by her condition, doubts that she is alive. While Shi-mak is out of the room, Ae-ja awakes and kills the doctor before vanishing again.

After he returns home with the painting, Shi-mak's family continue to be troubled by strange occurrences. As his mother returns home from the temple, she is attacked by Ae-ja, and, after a struggle, she falls into the river and is swept away. At the house, Shi-mak's wife, Hye-sook, is powerless to stop Ae-ja from disappearing with their eldest daughter.

Shi-mak's mother then returns home apparently unhurt, though she acts oddly, showing fear at the sight of the rosary and licking the children like a cat. Later, a strange woman arrives at the house claiming to be the new housemaid, and soon after the other two children disappear. The next day, Shi-mak follows his wife to an abandoned temple, where she is killed by Ae-ja. He is prevented from saving her by the housemaid, who tells him that he has a greater hardship ahead of him. She gives him a globe, asking him to return it when he no longer needs it. Shi-mak returns home to his mother, but when he notices in a mirror that her reflection is that of a cat's, she reveals her true nature as a spirit and attacks him. He stops her attack with the housemaid's orb, and she dies.

Distraught, Shi-mak takes the portrait and smashes it on the floor, discovering a diary that was concealed in the frame. Reading it, he finds a confession made by the artist Joon-chul, telling of the plot made ten years ago to kill Ae-ja. At that time, Shi-mak and Ae-ja had been a happily married couple. Hye-sook, jealous of the couple and resentful of her position as the family's maid, conspired with Shi-mak's mother, who despised her daughter-in-law for her inability to bear children. Enlisting the help of Joon-chul and Dr. Park, they convinced Shi-mak that his wife was having an affair, and poisoned Ae-ja. As she lay dying with only a cat for company, Ae-ja swore vengeance on those that had killed her. Years later, Joon-chul was enslaved by Ae-ja's spirit, who commanded him to create the cursed portrait as a means of taking her revenge.

Though saddened by this news, Shi-mak is relieved to hear the voices of his children. Noticing that the third eye is missing from the Buddha statue in the garden, he replaces it with the orb in his pocket, and at once the three children reappear. Realising that the housekeeper was a guardian angel sent to protect his family, Shi-mak gives his thanks to Buddha and prays for Ae-ja's soul.

== Cast ==
- Lee Ye-chun ... Lee Shi-mak
- Do Kum-bong ... Ae-ja
- Jeong Ae-ran
- Lee Bin-hwa
- Namgoong Won
- Ju Seok-yang
- Gang Mun
- Jo Seok-geun
- Ra Jeong-ok
- Lee Up-dong
- Kim Hwak-sil
- Choe Jeong-ae
- Chu Seok-yang
- Im Yun-hui
- Han Jae-gyeong

== Release and critical response ==
A Devilish Homicide was produced by Jeil Films, and was originally released on August 12, 1965.

It was a late addition to the lineup of the 7th Puchon International Fantastic Film Festival (2003), and was described by Midnight Eye correspondent Jasper Sharp as "a delirious B-movie shocker". In 2007, A Devilish Homicide was released on DVD by CineLine Korea. In a review for BeyondHollywood.com, James Mudge noted that the film shared many of the themes and motifs of more recent Korean horror films, blending folklore with then-current concerns, in this case fears over the changing role of the traditional family unit. He commented, "Lee's direction has at times an almost expressionistic feel, with exaggerated camera angles and weird set design working well to keep the viewer on edge and to give the film a surreal look... The murky black and white photography, along with some good suggestive use of shadows, gives the proceedings a nightmarish, gothic air". He also considered the special effects to be "fairly accomplished for the time", and regarded the film as "far more than just a curiosity piece".

The Korean Film Archive offered free viewing of A Devilish Homicide on its website in July 2008 and on YouTube since December 2, 2015.
