= Korean Cuisine and Dining =

South Korean documentary series

- 한국인의 밥상
- Genre: Food documentary
- Presented by: Choi Bool-am (episode 1–699); Choi Soo-jong (episode 700–present)
- Country of origin: South Korea
- Original language: Korean

Original release
- Release: January 6, 2011 – present

Korean Cuisine and Dining (Korean: 한국인의 밥상), sometimes translated as Korean Food Table, is a South Korean television documentary series that airs every Wednesday at 7:40 pm (KST). It focuses on Korean cuisine and is presented by Choi Soo-jong, who replaced Choi Bool-am. The program premiered on January 6, 2011.

The show has also notably covered Korean history in order to explain the various foods covered. The series has also covered food of the Korean diaspora, including Sakhalin Korean cuisine and Koryo-saram cuisine.

The series celebrated its tenth anniversary on January 7, 2021. By this point, Choi Bool-am had traveled over 350,000 km (220,000 mi) to over 1,400 destinations for the show. He reported that the food that moved him the most was food of the Korean diaspora. Choi was reportedly moved by kimchi made from the rind of watermelon in Latin America, as well as kkaetnip leaves grown by a Korean–American couple in a New York City apartment. He felt that the stories of the people making the food was more important than the food itself, and was motivated by a sense of duty to share these stories with others.

Planning for an episode reportedly begins around two months in advance. Scouting out locations for filming and the filming itself each take several days.
