= A Fine, Windy Day =

- Poster to A Fine, Windy Day (1980)
- Hangul: 바람 불어 좋은 날
- RR: Baram bureo joeun nal
- MR: Param purŏ choŭn nal
- Directed by: Lee Jang-ho
- Written by: Lee Jang-ho; Choi Il-nam
- Produced by: Lee Woo-suk
- Starring: Ahn Sung-ki; Kim Seong-chan; Lee Yeong-ho
- Cinematography: Seo Jeong-min
- Edited by: Kim Hee-su
- Music by: Kim Do-hyang
- Distributed by: Dong A Exports Co.
- Release date: November 27, 1980 (South Korea)
- Running time: 113 minutes
- Country: South Korea
- Language: Korean

A Fine, Windy Day (Korean: 바람 불어 좋은 날; RR: Baram bureo joeun nal) is a 1980 South Korean film written and directed by Lee Jang-ho.

== Plot ==
The lives of three young working-class male friends are followed in the film. Chun-shik works at a barbershop where he is in love with Miss Yu, a co-worker. Gil-nam, a hotel worker, is in love with Jin-ok, who works at a hair salon. Duk-bae, the most innocent of the trio, works at a Chinese restaurant and is torn between his affections for a factory-worker and Myung-hi, a wealthy girl. Together over drinks, the three young men talk over their lives and their aimless thoughts about the future. At the end of the film they are separated when Chun-shik is arrested for assault, Gil-nam begins his military service and Duk-bae decides to roll with life's punches.

== Cast ==
- Lee Yeong-ho... Chun-shik (barbershop worker)
- Ahn Sung-ki... Duk-bae (Chinese restaurant worker)
- Kim Seong-chan... Gil-nam (hotel worker)
- Im Ye-jin... Choon-soon (Chun-shik's younger sister)
- Kim Bo-yeon... Miss Yu (barbershop worker)
- Yu Ji-in...
- Choi Bool-am... Kim He-jang
- Kim Hee-ra... Female Chinese restaurant worker
- Park Won-sook... Female Chinese restaurant owner
- Kim In-moon... Man at the outdoor food stand
- Kim Young-ae... Woman at the outdoor food stand

== Release ==
In a special program in collaboration with the Korean Film Archive to revisit Ahn Sung-ki's life, the 31st Busan International Film Festival will present the film in its run in October 2026.

== Awards ==
Grand Bell Awards (1980)

- Best Director: Lee Jang-ho
- Best New Actor: Ahn Sung-ki
- Best Screen Adaptation

Baeksang Arts Awards (1981)

- Grand Award: Lee Jang-ho
- Best Production: Lee Woo-suk
- Best Performance by a New Actor: Kim Seong-chan

== Bibliography ==
- A Fine, Windy Day at IMDb
- Good Windy Day at the Korean Movie Database (in Korean)
- Kim, Kyung-hyun (2004). "1. At the Edge of a Metropolis in A Fine, Windy Day and Green Fish". The Remasculinization of Korean Cinema. Durham and London: Duke University Press. pp. 34–43. ISBN 0-8223-3267-1.
