= Lee Tae-gon =

South Korean actor (born 1977)

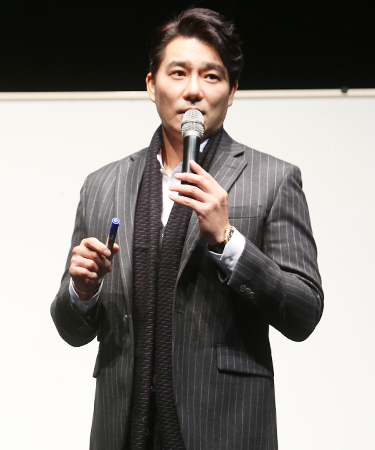
- Lee in 2017
- Born: November 27, 1977 (age 48); Daejeon, South Korea
- Occupation: Actor
- Years active: 2005–present

Korean name
- Hangul: 이태곤
- Hanja: 李泰坤
- RR: I Taegon
- MR: I T'aegon

Lee Tae-gon (Korean: 이태곤; born November 27, 1977) is a South Korean actor.

== Personal life ==
Lee attended Kyonggi University, where he studied Physical Education, majoring in swimming, he was a qualified swimming instructor before entering the entertainment industry. Lee has two older sisters. He is also a very keen fisherman, often catching large breams.

== Career ==
On December 16, 2011, Lee was honored with the Grand Prize for his work in Gwanggaeto, The Great Conqueror at the 19th Korean Culture & Entertainment Awards. He was additionally nominated for the KBS Drama Awards Top Excellence Award and the Daesang, or Artist of the Year, in recognition of his portrayal as the king on the KBS historical saga Gwanggaeto, The Great Conqueror. The awards were held on December 31, 2011.

== Filmography ==
=== Television appearances ===
- Dear Heaven (SBS, 2005)
- Yeon Gae Somun as Yeon Gae Somun (young adult) (SBS, 2006)
- Winter Bird as Jung Do Hyun (MBC, 2007)
- Detective Mr. Lee (MegaTV, 2008)
- My Life's Golden Age as Dong Han (MBC, 2008)
- Assorted Gems (also known as Jewel Bibimbap) as Seo Yeong-guk (MBC, 2009)
- Golden Fish as Lee Tae Young (MBC, 2010)
- Gwanggaeto, The Great Conqueror as Dam Duk/Gwanggaeto the Great (KBS1, 2011)
- One Well-Raised Daughter as Han Yoo-chan (SBS, 2013)
- Love (ft. Marriage and Divorce) as Shin Yoo-shin (TV Chosun, 2021–2022) - Season 1–2

=== Television shows ===
- City Sashimi Restaurant (2023) - Chef
- Middle class 4 (2022) - Host
- Trust Me and Follow Me, Urban Fishermen 4 (2022) - Cast Member
- Stars' Top Recipe at Fun-Staurant (2022) - Cast Member
- Fan Heart Contest (2022) - Host
- Law of the Jungle in Siberia - 2012 - Cast member, Ep. 23-28
- I Live Alone - Cast member, - Ep. 69-111
- Law of the Jungle in Brunei - 2015 - Cast member, Ep. 175-177
- Law of the Jungle in Papua New Guinea - 2016 - Cast member, Ep. 216-219
- Law of the Jungle in Fiji - 2017 - Cast member, Ep. 288-292
- Battle Trip - 2017 - contestant with Kangnam, Eps. 65-67
- Radio Star (TV series) - 2017 - Guest, Ep. 525
- Everybody's Kitchen - Guest, Ep. 4
- Law of the Jungle in Northern Mariana Islands - 2018 - Cast member, Ep. 349-452
- A Man Who Feeds The Dog - Cast member

== Awards and nominations ==
=== Won ===
- 2005 SBS Drama Awards: New Star Award
- 2010 MBC Drama Awards: PD Award, Golden Fish
- 2011 KBS Drama Awards: Excellence Award, Actor in a Serial Drama, King Gwanggaeto the Great
- 2019 SBS Entertainment Awards: Best Challenge Award, in variety show, Law of the Jungle

=== Nominated ===
- 2009 MBC Drama Awards: Best Couple Award with Go Na-eun, Assorted Gems
- 2010 MBC Drama Awards: Top Excellence Award, Actor, Golden Fish
- 2010 MBC Drama Awards: Grand Prize, Golden Fish
- 2011 KBS Drama Awards: Top Excellence Award, Actor, King Gwanggaeto the Great
- 2014 SBS Drama Awards: Excellence Award, Actor in a Serial Drama, One Well-Raised Daughter
