= So Yoo-jin =

South Korean actress (born 1981)

So Yu-jin
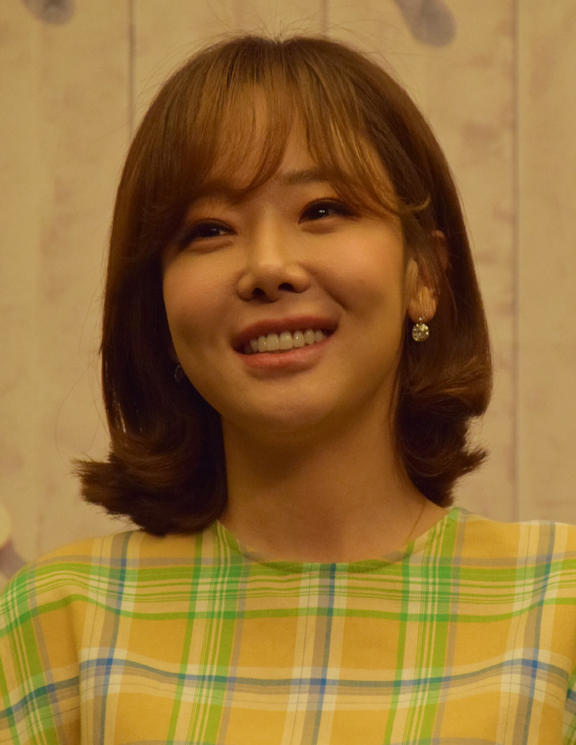
- So in 2019
- Born: August 11, 1981 (age 45); Munjeong-dong, Songpa District, Seoul, South Korea
- Education: Kaywon High School of Arts; Dongguk University - Film and Digital Media
- Occupation: Actress
- Years active: 2000–present
- Agent: Star J Entertainment
- Spouse: Paik Jong-won (m. 2013)
- Children: 3

Korean name
- Hangul: 소유진
- Hanja: 蘇有珍
- RR: So Yujin
- MR: So Yujin

So Yu-jin (Korean: 소유진; born August 11, 1981) is a South Korean actress. She is best known for her leading roles in the television dramas Rookie (2000), Delicious Proposal (2001), Fox and Cotton Candy (2001), as well as in Rival (2002) and Mai Ratima (2013).

== Personal life ==
=== Marriage and family ===
On January 19, 2013, So married Paik Jong-won, chef and CEO of 26 restaurant franchises with 169 branches across the country. Their first child, a son, was born on April 9, 2014. Their second child, a daughter, was born on September 21, 2015. In April 2016, So's father died the same day as of her son's birthday. On February 8, 2018, So gave birth to her third child, a daughter.

=== Ambassadorship ===
She became the goodwill ambassador for the Seoul International Beauty Industry Festival in April 2013. In March 2012, she became the goodwill ambassador for A Clean. On December 12, 2011, she became a goodwill ambassador for the life sharing program.

== Filmography ==
=== Television drama ===
- Villains Everywhere (KBS2, 2025)
- My Dearest (MBC, 2023)
- My Healing Love (MBC, 2018)
- Five Enough (KBS2, 2016)
- Great Stories "The Kim Sisters" (TV Chosun/tvN, 2015)
- Potato Star 2013QR3 (tvN, 2013) (cameo, ep 11)
- Bel Ami (KBS2, 2013) (guest appearance, ep 1–4)
- Drama Special "Happy! Rose Day" (KBS2, 2013)
- Can't Live Without You (MBC, 2012)
- Happy Ending (jTBC, 2012)
- Golden Fish (MBC, 2010)
- Thirty Thousand Miles in Search of My Son (SBS, 2007–2008)
- Unstoppable High Kick! (MBC, 2007) (cameo, ep 107)
- Alone in Love (SBS, 2006) (cameo, ep 1)
- Seoul 1945 (KBS1, 2006)
- Cute or Crazy (SBS, 2005)
- Banjun Drama (SBS, 2004–2005)
- Good Person (MBC, 2003)
- The Bean Chaff of My Life (MBC, 2003)
- Rival (SBS, 2002)
- Fox and Cotton Candy (MBC, 2001–2002)
- Cool (KBS2, 2001)
- Delicious Proposal (MBC, 2001)
- Rookie (SBS, 2000–2001)
- Virtue (SBS, 2000)

=== Film ===
- Mai Ratima (2013)
- The Dinner (short film, 2011)
- Break Away (2010)
- Short! Short! Short! 2009: Show Me the Money (2009, short film "Sitcom")
- 3 Colors Love Story (2006, short film "I'm O.K")
- The Rainy Day (2005)
- 2424 (2002)
- Rundim (2001, animated)

=== Variety shows ===
- Oh Eun-Young Report - Southern Couple (2022, Host)
- The Return of Super Mom (2021) (KBS2, Cast Member) Chuseok Special
- The Return of Superman (2020–2024) (Narrator:Episode 341–present)
- Show! Audio Jockey (tvN, 2019)
- We Will Channel You (SBS, 2019)
- Wonderful Day (MBC Music, 2012)
- Section TV (MBC, 2001–2002)
- Inkigayo (Popular Music) (SBS, 2001–2002)
- Music Box (iTV, 2001)
- In Search of the Best (SBS, 2000)

=== Radio programs ===
- To You Who Forget the Night with So Yoo-jin (KBS Happy FM, 2009)
- Popular Songs with So Yoo-jin (KBS Happy FM, 2006)

== Theatre ==
- Between Raindrops (2008)
- King Lear (2021)
- Kim Ji-young, Born 1982 as Kim Ji-young (2022)
- The Seagull as Arghona (2022–2023)

== Awards and nominations ==
| Year | Award | Category | Nominated work | Result |
|---|---|---|---|---|
| 2001 | MBC Entertainment Awards | Excellence Award | Section TV | Won |
| 2001 | MBC Drama Awards | Best New Actress | Delicious Proposal | Won |
| 2002 | Paiksang Arts Awards | Most Popular Actress (TV) | Rival | Won |
| 2002 | SBS Drama Awards | Top 10 Stars | Rival | Won |
| 2002 | SBS Drama Awards | Most Popular Actress | Rival | Won |
| 2003 | MBC Drama Awards | Excellence Award, Actress | The Bean Chaff of My Life, Good Person | Won |
| 2010 | MBC Drama Awards | Excellence Award, Actress | Golden Fish | Nominated |
| 2012 | MBC Drama Awards | Excellence Award, Actress in a Serial Drama | Can't Live Without You | Nominated |
| 2016 | KBS Drama Awards | Excellence Award, Actress in a Serial Drama | Five Enough | Won |
| 2018 | MBC Drama Awards | Top Excellence Award, Actress in a Serial Drama | My Healing Love | Won |
| 2021 | KBS Entertainment Awards | Excellence Award in Reality Category | The Return of Superman | Nominated |
