= Show! Audio Jockey =

South Korean television show

- Promotional poster
- Hangul: 쇼! 오디오자키
- RR: Syo! Odio jaki
- MR: Syo! Odio chak'i
- Genre: Reality show
- Starring: Current:Park Myeong-su; Boom Former: Monsta X's Wonho; Monsta X's Minhyuk; Monsta X's Yoo Ki-hyun; Monsta X's Lee Joo-heon; Sung Si-kyung; So Yoo-jin
- Country of origin: South Korea
- Original language: Korean
- No. of seasons: 1
- No. of episodes: 16 (list of episodes)

Production
- Producers: Lee Yong-joon; Kim Se-hun
- Production location: South Korea
- Running time: 80 minutes

Original release
- Network: tvN
- Release: March 17 – June 30, 2019

Show! Audio Jockey (Korean: 쇼! 오디오자키) was a South Korean variety show program on tvN starring Park Myeong-su, Sung Si-kyung, So Yoo-jin, Boom and 4 members from Monsta X (Wonho, Minhyuk, Yoo Ki-hyun and Lee Joo-heon). It aired on tvN starting on March 17, 2019, and aired its last episode on June 30, 2019. It was broadcast by tvN on Sundays at 18:10 (KST).

== Casts ==
– Present.
– Absent.

Names	Episodes															
Names	1	2	3	4	5	6	7	8	9	10	11	12	13	14	15	16
Park Myeong-su																
Boom																
Sung Si-kyung																
So Yoo-jin																
Wonho (Monsta X)																
Minhyuk (Monsta X)																
Yoo Ki-hyun (Monsta X)																
Lee Joo-heon (Monsta X)																

== Synopsis ==
This is a show where radio and television come together. In the show, there was a group of Audio Jockeys (AJs) who hosted individual radio programs. AJs hosted their programs in an open and movable studio. Listeners were able to listen through Podbbang and tvN's official YouTube Channel during the actual recording of the show. A few days after the actual recording, the audio of the different programs hosted by the AJs was released. Afterwards, the radio show was also televised to enable the audience to watch how the AJs prepared behind the scenes and hosted their individual shows during the program itself.

On 7th and 8th recording, the concept changed to visual radio where listeners could watch live on YouTube what was happening at the recording location itself.

== Segments ==
Segments	Details
Episode 1 – 4
Monsta X's Monstyle	In this segment, the 4 Monsta X members introduced different types of food.
Episode 1 – 6
Boom Box	During this segment, there were small segments like "Answer the Music" for the listeners to take part, lip-sync performances and many more that drew many listeners' attention.
So Yoo-jin's Sweet Salon	In this segment, Yoo-jin gave listeners parenting tips. In addition, she also got on the line with a caller, who taught Yoo-jin their recipes of their local (the recording location) famous dishes. Through the guide, she tried her best to cook out the dishes on the spot.
Sung Si-kyung by Your Side	In this segment, there were some love talks and also live singing performances.
Park Myeong-su's Easy Talent	In this segment, Myeong-su and the audiences competed with each other and played many more small games.
Episode 5 – 6
AJ Joint Broadcast	All the 4 AJs joined forces together for the very first time to host the show together.
Episode 7 – 10
Itinerant Traveller	Travel guide Roh Jung-ho recommended some good places to travel and great foods to eat at the different recording locations to the listeners.
So So Kitchen	The AJs got on the line with a caller, who taught the AJs their cooking recipe on their local (the recording location) famous dishes. Through the guide, the AJs will try their best to cook out the dishes on the spot.
Trot Man and Woman	There will be 4 trot men and women who competed with each other to see who will be the ultimate winner. The winner was able to end the segment with his/her own solo performance.
Episode 7 – 16
Paldo Roadsinger	In this segment, everyone showed off their talents by singing to win the hearts of the AJs and the guest hosts.

== List of Episodes ==
Recording (Filming Date)	Location	Episode(s)	AJ(s)	Show Title	Time Slot (KST)	Winning Content (AJ)	Ref
1 (February 17, 2019)	Yangyang County, Gangwon Province, South Korea	1–2	Boom	Boom Box (붐박스)	07:00–08:30	Boom Box (Boom)	
1 (February 17, 2019)	Yangyang County, Gangwon Province, South Korea	1–2	So Yoo-jin	So Yoo-jin's Sweet Salon (소유진의 스윗살롱)	09:00–10:30	Boom Box (Boom)	
1 (February 17, 2019)	Yangyang County, Gangwon Province, South Korea	1–2	Sung Si-kyung	Sung Si-kyung by Your Side (그대 곁에 성시경입니다)	11:00–12:30	Boom Box (Boom)	
1 (February 17, 2019)	Yangyang County, Gangwon Province, South Korea	1–2	Park Myeong-su	Park Myeong-su's Easy Talent (박명수의 호락호락쇼)	13:00–14:30	Boom Box (Boom)	
1 (February 17, 2019)	Yangyang County, Gangwon Province, South Korea	1–2	Wonho, Minhyuk, Yoo Ki-hyun, Lee Joo-heon (Monsta X)	Monsta X's Monstyle (몬스타엑스의 몬스타일)	15:00–16:30	Boom Box (Boom)	
2 (March 20, 2019)	Gurye County, South Jeolla Province, South Korea	3–4	Park Myeong-su	Park Myeong-su's Easy Talent (박명수의 호락호락쇼)	09:00–10:30	Park Myeong-su's Easy Talent (Park Myeong-su)	
2 (March 20, 2019)	Gurye County, South Jeolla Province, South Korea	3–4	So Yoo-jin	So Yoo-jin's Sweet Salon (소유진의 스윗살롱)	11:00–12:30	Park Myeong-su's Easy Talent (Park Myeong-su)	
2 (March 20, 2019)	Gurye County, South Jeolla Province, South Korea	3–4	Boom	Boom Box (붐박스)	13:00–14:30	Park Myeong-su's Easy Talent (Park Myeong-su)	
2 (March 20, 2019)	Gurye County, South Jeolla Province, South Korea	3–4	Sung Si-kyung	Sung Si-kyung by Your Side (그대 곁에 성시경입니다)	15:00–16:30	Park Myeong-su's Easy Talent (Park Myeong-su)	
2 (March 20, 2019)	Gurye County, South Jeolla Province, South Korea	3–4	Wonho, Minhyuk, Yoo Ki-hyun, Lee Joo-heon (Monsta X)	Monsta X's Monstyle (몬스타엑스의 몬스타일)	17:00–18:30	Park Myeong-su's Easy Talent (Park Myeong-su)	
3 (April 3, 2019)	Soonchunhyang University	5–6	So Yoo-jin	So Yoo-jin's Sweet Salon (소유진의 스윗살롱)	12:00–13:00	—N/a	
3 (April 3, 2019)	Soonchunhyang University	5–6	Sung Si-kyung	Sung Si-kyung by Your Side (그대 곁에 성시경입니다)	13:30–14:30	—N/a	
3 (April 3, 2019)	Soonchunhyang University	5–6	Boom	Boom Box (붐박스)	15:00–16:00	—N/a	
3 (April 3, 2019)	Soonchunhyang University	5–6	Park Myeong-su	Park Myeong-su's Easy Talent (박명수의 호락호락쇼)	16:30–17:30	—N/a	
3 (April 3, 2019)	Soonchunhyang University	5–6	So Yoo-jin, Sung Si-kyung, Boom, Park Myeong-su	AJ Joint Broadcast (AJ 합동방송)	18:00–19:00	—N/a	
4 (April 17, 2019)	Dongseong-ro, Daegu, South Korea	7–8	Sung Si-kyung and Boom	Itinerant Traveller (방랑의 여행가들)	11:00–12:00	—N/a	
4 (April 17, 2019)	Dongseong-ro, Daegu, South Korea	7–8	Park Myeong-su and So Yoo-jin	So So Kitchen (소소키친)	12:30–13:30	—N/a	
4 (April 17, 2019)	Dongseong-ro, Daegu, South Korea	7–8	Sung Si-kyung and Boom	Paldo Roadsinger (팔도 로드싱어)	14:00–16:00	—N/a	
4 (April 17, 2019)	Dongseong-ro, Daegu, South Korea	7–8	Park Myeong-su and So Yoo-jin	Trot Man and Woman (트롯남녀)	16:30–18:30	—N/a	
5 (May 1, 2019)	Wangdolcho Plaza (Hupo-Myeon, Uljin County, North Gyeongsang Province, South Korea)	9–10	Park Myeong-su and So Yoo-jin	Trot Man and Woman (트롯남녀)	12:00–13:00	—N/a	
5 (May 1, 2019)	Wangdolcho Plaza (Hupo-Myeon, Uljin County, North Gyeongsang Province, South Korea)	9–10	Sung Si-kyung and Boom	Paldo Roadsinger (팔도 로드싱어)	14:00–16:00	—N/a	
5 (May 1, 2019)	Wangdolcho Plaza (Hupo-Myeon, Uljin County, North Gyeongsang Province, South Korea)	9–10	Park Myeong-su and So Yoo-jin	So So Kitchen (소소키친)	16:30–17:30	—N/a	
5 (May 1, 2019)	Wangdolcho Plaza (Hupo-Myeon, Uljin County, North Gyeongsang Province, South Korea)	9–10	Sung Si-kyung and Boom	Itinerant Traveller (방랑의 여행가들)	18:00–19:00	—N/a	
6 (May 15, 2019)	Seongan-gil, Cheongju, South Korea	11–12	Sung Si-kyung, Boom and Park Myeong-su	Paldo Roadsinger (팔도 로드싱어)	13:00–15:30	—N/a	
6 (May 15, 2019)	Skyroad (Daejeon, South Korea)	11–12	Sung Si-kyung, Boom and Park Myeong-su	Paldo Roadsinger (팔도 로드싱어)	19:30–22:00	—N/a	
7 (May 29, 2019)	Jeonju Hanok Village (Jeonju, South Korea)	13–14	Boom and Park Myeong-su	Paldo Roadsinger (팔도 로드싱어)	13:00–16:00	—N/a	
7 (May 29, 2019)	U Square (Gwangju, South Korea)	13–14	Boom and Park Myeong-su	Paldo Roadsinger (팔도 로드싱어)	19:30–22:00	—N/a	
8 (June 12, 2019)	Lotte World Tower (Jamsil, South Korea)	15–16	Boom and Park Myeong-su	Paldo Roadsinger (팔도 로드싱어)	13:00–15:30	—N/a	
8 (June 12, 2019)	Galmaegi Stage (갈매기 무대) (Wolmido, Incheon, South Korea)	15–16	Boom and Park Myeong-su	Paldo Roadsinger (팔도 로드싱어)	20:00–22:30	—N/a	

== Guests ==
=== Park Myeong-su's Easy Talent ===
Park Myeong-su's Easy Talent (Ep 1 – 6)

Name	Episode(s)	Ref(s).
Seol Ha-yoon	1–6	
Kim Tae-jin	1–6	
Kim Soo-chan	3–4, 6	
Park Seul-gi	4	

=== Boom Box ===
Boom Box (Ep 1 – 6)

Name	Episode(s)	Ref(s).
Yoon Sung-ho	1–4	
Kim In-seok	1–4	
Seol Ha-yoon	5–6	
Jo Bin (Norazo)	5–6	
Won Heum (Norazo)	5–6	

=== Sweet Salon ===
Sweet Salon (Ep 1 – 6)

Name	Episode(s)	Ref(s).
Alberto Mondi	1–4	
Sim Jin-hwa	6	

=== Sung Si-kyung by Your Side ===
Sung Si-kyung by Your Side (Ep 1 – 6)

Name	Episode(s)	Ref(s).
Ben	1–2, 4	
Roh Jung-hoon	3–6	
Solji (EXID)	5–6	

=== Trot Man and Woman ===
Trot Man and Woman (Ep 7 – 10)

Name	Episode(s)	Ref(s).
Park Seong-yeon	7–10	
Na Sang-do	7–8	
Han Dam-hee	8–10	
Jeong Ho	9–10	
Jang Min-ho	9–10	

=== Itinerant Traveller ===
Itinerant Traveller (Ep 7 – 10)

Name	Episode(s)	Ref(s).
Solji (EXID)	7–8	
Roh Jung-hoon	7–9	

=== So So Kitchen ===
So So Kitchen (Ep 7 – 10)

Name	Episode(s)	Note(s)	Ref(s).
Baek Jong-won	8	Through phone call	

=== Paldo Road Singer ===
Paldo Road Singer (Ep 7 – 16)

Name	Episode(s)	Ref(s).
Solji (EXID)	7–8, 13–14	
Seol Ha-yoon	7–16	

== Ratings ==
- Ratings listed below are the individual corner ratings of Show! Audio Jockey. (Note: Individual corner ratings do not include commercial time, which regular ratings include.)
- In the ratings below, the highest rating for the show will be in red and the lowest rating for the show will be in blue each year.

Ep. #	Original Airdate	AGB Nielsen Ratings Nationwide
1	March 17, 2019	0.7%
2	March 24, 2019	0.6%
3	March 31, 2019	0.754%
4	April 7, 2019	0.5%
5	April 14, 2019	0.741%
6	April 21, 2019	0.543%
7	April 28, 2019	1.141%
8	May 5, 2019	0.846%
9	May 12, 2019	0.954%
10	May 19, 2019	1.077%
11	May 26, 2019	1.001%
12	June 2, 2019	1.338%
13	June 9, 2019	1.036%
14	June 16, 2019	0.810%
15	June 23, 2019	0.867%
16	June 30, 2019	1.529%
