= Lee Yong-min =

- Born: 1916; Seoul, South Korea
- Died: April 26, 1983 (aged 66–67)
- Occupations: Film director, screenwriter, cinematographer

Korean name
- Hangul: 이용민
- Hanja: 李庸民
- RR: I Yongmin
- MR: I Yongmin

Lee Yong-min (1916 – April 26, 1983) was a South Korean film director, screenwriter and cinematographer. Lee studied filmmaking in Japan and debuted with a documentary film The Topography of Jeju island (1946). He made audience friendly commercial films in various genres. In 1960s and 1970s, he made several horror films that represented his best talents including A Devilish Homicide (1965) and A Neckless Beauty (1966).

== Filmography ==
=== As director ===
- The Topography of Jeju island (documentary, 1946)
- A Herd boy and a Golden Watch (1949)
- The Star of Million (1954)
- A Cross in Gunfire (1956)
- Holiday in Seoul (1956)
- A Wild Chrysanthemum (1957)
- If You Overcome the Crisis (1959)
- Homecoming (1960)
- A Tragedy of Korea 1961-03-08
- A Flower of Evil (1961)
- The Gate to Hell (1962)
- A Happy Day of Jinsa Maeng (1962)
- A Bridegroom from a Grave (1963)
- The Hell Has No Vacancy (1964)
- A Devilish Homicide (1965)
- A Neckless Beauty (1966)
- The Japanese Emperor and the Martyrs (1967)
- Devil and Beauty (1969)
- A Dangerous Husband (1970)
- Revenge of the Snake Woman (1970)
- The Man with Two Faces (1975)
- Black Ghost (1976)

=== As screenwriter ===
- The Topography of Jeju island (documentary, 1946)
- A Herd boy and a Golden Watch (1949)
- The Star of Million (1954)
- A Devilish Homicide (1965)
- A Neckless Beauty (1966)
- The Man with Two Faces (1975)

=== As cinematographer ===
- The Town of Hope (1948)
- The Star of Million (1954)
- Don't Misunderstand (1957)
- A Wild Chrysanthemum (1957)
- The Crystal Pagoda (1958)
- The Love Marriage (1958)
- King Gojong and martyr An Jung-geun (1959)
- 1919 Independence Movement (1959)
- Qin Shu Huangdi and the Great Wall of China (1962)
- A Happy Day of Jinsa Maeng (1962)
- A Bridegroom from a Grave (1963)
- The Conqueror (1963)
- The Korean Instrument with 12 strings (1964)
- The Tae-baeks (1975)

== Awards ==
- 1963 1st Blue Dragon Film Awards: Best Cinematography (The Conqueror)
