= Transgression (1974 film) =

- Theatrical poster
- Hangul: 파계
- Hanja: 破戒
- RR: Pagye
- MR: P'agye
- Directed by: Kim Ki-young
- Written by: Kim Ki-young
- Based on: Pagye by Ko Un
- Produced by: Lee Woo-suk
- Starring: Choi Bool-am; Park Byeong-ho
- Cinematography: Jung Il-sung
- Edited by: Hyeon Dong-chun
- Music by: Han Sang-ki
- Distributed by: Dong-a Exports Co. Ltd.
- Release date: November 9, 1974
- Running time: 112 minutes
- Country: South Korea
- Language: Korean

Transgression (Korean: 파계) is a 1974 South Korean drama film directed by Kim Ki-young.

== Plot ==
Based on a novel by Ko Un, the film tells the story of two students of Zen Buddhism.

== Cast ==
- Choi Bool-am
- Park Byeong-ho
- Jo Jae-seong
- Im Ye-jin

== Bibliography ==
- Ahn, Min-hwa. "Transgression". [The House of Kim Ki-young]. Archived from the original on 2004-05-10.
