= The Man with Two Faces (1975 film) =

- Directed by: Lee Yong-min
- Written by: Lee Yong-min
- Produced by: Shim Tae-seon
- Starring: Lee Ye-chun; Kim Ok-jin; Jin Bong-jin
- Release date: 3 April 1975
- Running time: 76 minutes
- Country: South Korea
- Language: Korean

The Man with Two Faces (Korean: 공포의 이중인간; RR: Gongpoui ijungingan) is a 1975 South Korean horror film. The film is a rough adaptation of Frankenstein.

== Synopsis ==
A mad scientist seeks to create human life by using dead bodies. His plan goes awry and the newly created creature lashes out before escaping.

== Cast ==
- Lee Ye-chun
- Kim Ok-jin
- Jin Bong-jin

== Release ==
The Man With Two Faces was released in South Korea during 1975. The Korean Film Archive began work on restoring the film, along with seven others, in 2004. In 2006 the organization completed their work, which they screened that same year. The Korean Film Archive would go on to screen the film as part of their 2014 online exhibition 한국영화 속 최고의 악당을 찾아서, 장르영화가 사랑한 악인들, (tr: In Search of the Best Villains in Korean Films, Villains Loved by Genre Films) on KMDb.

== Reception ==
A writer for KMDb praised the cinematography while also noting that the film's story flow kept it from being a "Korean Movie Masterpiece Selection" as opposed to a "Beep Beep B-Movie".
