= Lee Deok-hwa =

South Korean actor (born 1952)

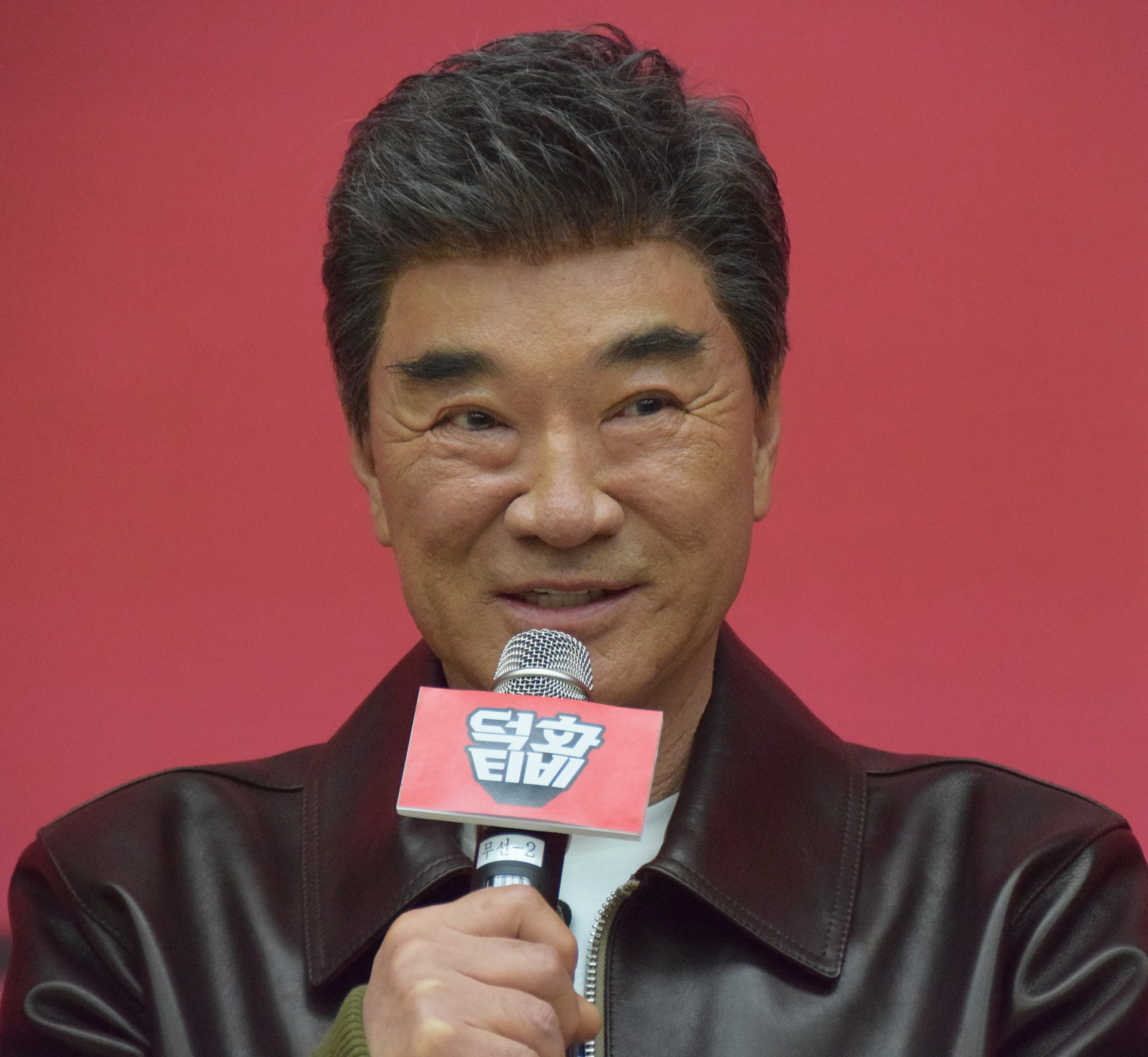
- Lee in 2019
- Born: May 8, 1952 (age 74); Seoul, South Korea
- Education: Dongguk University
- Occupation: Actor
- Years active: 1972–present
- Spouse: Kim Bo-ok
- Children: 2

Korean name
- Hangul: 이덕화
- Hanja: 李德華
- RR: I Deokhwa
- MR: I Tŏkhwa

Lee Deok-hwa (Korean: 이덕화; born May 8, 1952) is a South Korean actor. He served as 3rd chairman of Korean Film Actors Association (2009 – 2011).

== Career ==
Lee Deok-hwa studied theater and film at Dongguk University, and made his acting debut in 1972. He and his father, movie star Lee Ye-chun starred together in the 1975 horror film The Man with Two Faces.

In 1976, Lee and actress Im Ye-jin starred in Never Forget Me and I Am Really Sorry, both movies in the "Really Really" series that dealt with teenagers' aspirations and romance. They were box office hits, and hugely popular among high school students of that generation. Lee had previously acted opposite Im in Red Shoes (1975) and continued to do so in Blue Classroom (1976), I've Never Felt Like This Before (1976), Angry Apple (1977), When We Grow Up... (1977), The First Snow (1977), The Hey Days of Youth 77 (1979), and Love's Scribble (1988).

Lee received acting recognition for his subsequent films, including three Best Actor awards from the Grand Bell Awards for Lost Love (also known as In the Name of Memory, 1989), Fly High Run Far (1991), and I Will Survive (1993). Lee also became the first Korean actor to win an award at an international film festival in 1993 when he was chosen as Best Actor at the Moscow International Film Festival for I Will Survive.

On the small screen, Lee won the prestigious Daesang (or "Grand Prize") for the contemporary drama Love and Ambition (1987) and period epic Han Myung-hoe (1994). The latter is among the many real-life historical figures that Lee has played in his prolific career, including Joseon prime minister Han Myung-hoe in Han Myung-hoe (1994), Goryeo military dictator Yi Ui-min in Age of Warriors (2003), Tang dynasty general Xue Rengui in Dae Jo-yeong (2006), Goryeo military commander Gang Gam-chan in Empress Cheonchu (2009), and King Dongmyeong of Goguryeo in The King of Legend (2010).

In 2005, Lee played Chun Doo-hwan in the television drama 5th Republic, in an ongoing series on MBC about modern Korean political history. The Fifth Republic stands for the period that Chun was in power as president, depicting how he assumed power through a military coup and was forced to resign after a series of democratic movements. The drama was controversial and provoked mixed reactions. Some viewers complained that Lee's charismatic turn as Chun was an attempt to beautify or whitewash the image of the dictator, whereas former aides of Chun accused MBC of distorting history.

Later that year, Lee was reported to be the second top earner among all actors and entertainers who appeared on the KBS network in 2004, with total earnings of ₩339 million.

He reunited with Dae Jo Yeong writer Jang Young-chul in 2010 hit drama Giant, set during the economic boom of 1970-80s Korea. He again joined Jang's follow-up along with former co-star Lee Beom-soo in the 2012 drama History of a Salaryman. The series is set upon a quirky comedy and satire of China's Chu–Han Contention against the backdrop of the pharmaceutical industry, industrial espionage, and office politics.

In 2013, Lee received glowing reviews for his turn as King Injo in the period drama Blooded Palace: The War of Flowers, shown on cable channel jTBC. At a press conference prior to airing, Lee said, "Injo is a king who acceded to the throne due to revolutionary force. He had no philosophy of his own and was just a puppet king. It is more interesting for me to portray a king that we are unfamiliar with."

Lee also hosts variety shows, notably the Korean version of Dancing with the Stars for the past three seasons.

== Other activities ==
Lee was president of the Korea Film Actors Association in 1995, and its chairman from 2009 to 2010. He also served as festival director for the Chungmuro International Film Festival in Seoul (CHFFIS) from 2008 to 2009.

Lee ran for Congress in 1996 under the conservative New Korea Party, predecessor of the Grand National Party, but was defeated.

He actively campaigned for Lee Myung-bak during the 2007 primaries and presidential election, making speeches at sorties and taking an advisory post for the team's art and culture policy.

In 2009, Lee, Cho Jae-hyun, Choi Soo-jong, Sul Kyung-gu, Kim Hye-soo, Ahn Sung-ki and Park Joong-hoon each taught a master class in acting at the Im Kwon-taek Film and Art College of Dongseo University. All of them then waived their lecturing fees and donated the entire amount to scholarships for young actors. Lee said he willingly accepted the request to teach because he wanted to contribute to training talented film experts for the future of the Korean film industry, and that he was happy to donate his fee to that cause.

== Personal life ==
Lee's father is actor Lee Ye-chun (1919–1977). His daughter Lee Ji-hyun is also an actress.

== Filmography ==
=== Film ===
Year	Title	Role	Notes/Ref.
1975	Red Shoes		
1976	The Man with Two Faces		
1976	Never Forget Me	Young Soo	
1976	Let's Talk About Youth		
1976	Seven Tomboys		
1976	Seong Chun-hyang	Lee Mong-ryung	
1976	Blue Classroom		
1976	I Am Really Sorry	Tae Il	
1976	I've Never Felt Like This Before		
1976	Green Fallen Leaves	Kang Min	
1977	Angry Apple	Cheong	
1977	You Are the Moon, I Am the Sun	Seung Il	
1977	When We Grow Up...	Young Soo	
1977	The First Snow	Ki Chul	
1979	The Hey Days of Youth 77	Kwak Du-shik	
1979	We Took the Night Train	Hyuk	
1979	Tomorrow After Tomorrow	Gyu Hwa	
1979	The Rain at Night	Hwang Sa Bin	
1981	Two Sons		
1983	Wild Scoundrels of College		
1984	The Companion		
1987	A Street Musician	Jung Tae	
1988	You My Rose Mellow	Jong Hwan	
1988	Love's Scribble	Dal Ho	
1989	Lost Love		
1989	Happiness Does Not Come In Grades	Ba Gil-hwa	
1989	Country of Fire	Baek Chan-gyu	
1990	I Stand Everyday	Jang Baek-soo	
1990	The Woman Who Walks on Water	Jae Min	
1991	Fly High Run Far	Hae Wol	
1993	I Will Survive	Man Seok	
1994	I Wish for What Is Forbidden to Me		
1994	Life and Death of the Hollywood Kid		
1995	The Rose of Sharon Blooms Again	President Hoo	Support Role
1996	Cue	Min Wook	
2002	Lesson	Wook Ki	Support Role
2006	Radio Star		
2011	Sunny		cameo
2013	Eating Talking Faucking	[Philosopher]	Support Role

=== Television series ===
Year	Title	Role	Notes
1980	Ahrong-yi Darong-yi		
1981	Embrace		
1981	Let's Love		
1982	Regret		
1982	Can't Forget		
1982	Women's History – "Seogung Mama"	Prince Gwanghae	
1983	Portrait of You		
1983	Father and Son	In-geun	Support Role
1984	Love and Truth		
1985	The Season of Men		
1987	Love and Ambition	Park Tae-soo	Support Role
1988	500 Years of Joseon – "Queen Inhyeon"	Jang Hee-jae	Support Role
1989	Happy Woman	Park Jae-sub	
1989	Migratory Bird		
1990	The End of Love		
1991	Do You Know Eun Ha-su	Yoon Ji-woon	
1991	Angel Na Woon-gyu		
1992	Ambitions on Sand	No Gil-joon	
1993	Theme Series		
1994	Han Myung-hoe	Han Myung-hoe	
1997	Woman Next Door	Lee Ho-nam	
1997	Promise		
1998	Hong Gil-dong	Im Sung-joong	Support Role
1998	I Love You! I Love You!	Park Jong-hwan	Support Role
1999	Wave	Young-no's Uncle	Support Role
1999	Magic Castle	Wang Dae-san	Support Role
1999	LA Arirang		Support Role
2000	SWAT Police	Park Tae-hyung	Support Role
2000	Promise	Huh Tae-heung	Support Role
2000	Cheers for the Women		
2001	Ladies of the Palace	Yoon Won-hyung	
2002	Five Brothers and Sisters		Support Role
2003	All In	Kim In-dal	Support Role
2003	Age of Warriors	Lee Ui-min	
2004	Into the Storm	Kim Sung-chul	Support Role
2004	My Lovely Family	Song Min-sub	Support Role
2004	First Love of a Royal Prince	President Choi Eun-chul	Support Role
2005	5th Republic	Chun Doo-hwan	
2005	Golden Apple	Park Byung-sam	Support Role
2006	Look Back With a Smile	Lee Duk-hwa	
2006	Dae Jo-yeong	Xue Rengui	Support Role
2008	Formidable Rivals	President Kang Min-kook	Support Role
2008	Aeja's Older Sister, Minja	Han Beom-man	Support Role
2008	Hometown Legends – "Gisaeng House Ghost Story"	Kim Won-ik (Ep. 6)	
2009	Empress Cheonchu	General Gang Gam-chan	Support Role
2010	Giant	Hwang Tae-sop	Support Role
2010	Legend of the Patriots	Park Woong	
2010	The King of Legend	King Dong-myungsung	Support Role
2011	Midas	Kim Tae-sung	Support Role
2011	Spy Myung-wol	Company President Joo	Support Role
2012	History of a Salaryman	Jin Shi-hwang	Support Role
2012	21st Century Family	Lee Duk-hwa	
2012	May Queen	Jang Do-hyun	Support Role
2013	King of Ambition	Baek Chang-hak	Support Role
2013	Blooded Palace: The War of Flowers	King In-jo	
2013	Secret Love	Chairman Jo Han-il	Support Role
2013	Prime Minister & I	Chairman Na	Cameo
2014	Wonderful Day in October	Lee Shin-jae	
2014	Hotel King	Lee Joong-goo	
2015	My Heart Twinkle Twinkle	Lee Jin-sam	Support Role
2015	Shine or Go Crazy	Wang Shik-ryum	
2015	Hyde Jekyll, Me	Goo Myung-han	Support Role
2015	Unkind Ladies		Cameo (ep. 21–22)
2015	The Merchant: Gaekju 2015	Shin Seok-joo	
2016	Monster	Hwang Jae-man	Support Role
2016	Squad 38	Chairman Wang	Cameo
2017	Innocent Defendant		Cameo
2017	Suspicious Partner	Byun Young-hee	Support Role
2017	Hit the Top	Lee Soon-tae	Support Role
2017	Judge vs. Judge	Do Jin-myung	Support Role
2018	Welcome to Waikiki	Joon-ki's father	Cameo (ep. 4)
2018	Nice Witch	Oh Pyung-pan	Support Role
2019	Love in Sadness	Yoon Hyung-chul [Ma Ri's father]	Support Role
2021	The Red Sleeve	King Yeongjo	Support Role
2022	Business Proposal	Chairman Kang Da-goo	Support Role
2022	One Dollar Lawyer	Baek Hyun-moo	Support Role
2023	Stealer: The Treasure Keeper	Kim Young-soo	Support Role
2023	The Escape of the Seven	Bang Chil-sung	Support Role
2024	Jeongnyeon: The Star Is Born	Chae Gong-Seon's dad	Cameo
2024	Brewing Love	association chairman	Cameo
2026	Undercover Miss Hong	Kang Pil-beom	

=== Variety shows ===
Year	Title	Notes/Ref.
1981-1984	Show 2000	
1983–1985	MBC Campus Song Festival	Host
1985–1991	Saturday Saturday is Fun	
1991–1992	Show Seoul Seoul	
2010	Chuseok Special: Story Show 부탁해요	
2011	Special Feature: 7080 Idol Stars, King of Pop Singers	
2011–2013	Dancing with the Stars	
2017–present	City Fisherman	Cast Member; Season 1–4
2021	Hello Trot	Host with Bae Seong-jae
2023	City Sashimi Restaurant	General manager

=== Radio programs ===
Year	Title	Network
1982–1984	Women Salon	KBS Radio 4
1978–1979	Lee Deok-hwa and Im Ye-jin's Reckless Radio	TBC Radio

== Book ==
- 사람을 좋아하는 사람 이덕화 (1996)

== Awards and nominations ==
Name of the award ceremony, year presented, category, nominee of the award, and the result of the nomination
Award ceremony	Year	Category	Nominee / Work	Result
Baeksang Arts Awards	1985	Popularity Award - TV	Love and Truth	Won
Baeksang Arts Awards	1987	Popularity Award - TV	Love and Ambition	Won
Baeksang Arts Awards	1988	Best Actor – Film	You My Rose Mellow	Won
Baeksang Arts Awards	1992	Popularity Award - Film	Fly High Run Far	Won
Baeksang Arts Awards	2022	Best Supporting Actor – Television	The Red Sleeve	Nominated
Chunsa Film Art Awards	1991	Best Actor	Fly High Run Far	Won
Chunsa Film Art Awards	1992	Best Actor	Fly High Run Far	Won
Chunsa Film Art Awards	1993	Best Actor	I Will Survive	Won
Grand Bell Awards	1989	Best Actor	Lost Love	Won
MBC Drama Awards	1987	Grand Prize (Daesang)	Love and Ambition	Won
MBC Drama Awards	2005	Special Award	5th Republic	Won
MBC Drama Awards	2012	Golden Acting Award - Actor	May Queen	Won
MBC Drama Awards	2021	Best Achievement Award	The Red Sleeve	Won
MBC Drama Awards	2021	Top Excellence Award, Actor in a Miniseries	The Red Sleeve	Nominated
Moscow International Film Festival	1993	Best Actor	I Will Survive	Won
KBS Drama Awards	1994	Popularity Award	Han Myung-hoe	Won
KBS Drama Awards	1994	Grand Prize (Daesang)	Han Myung-hoe	Won
KBS Drama Awards	1994	Top Excellence Award - Actor	Han Myung-hoe	Won
KBS Drama Awards	2007	Top Excellence Award - Actor	Dae Jo-yeong	Won
SBS Drama Awards	2010	Best Supporting Actor in a Special Planning Drama	Giant	Won
SBS Drama Awards	2012	Special Award, Actor in a Miniseries	History of a Salaryman	Won
SBS Drama Awards	2014	Special Award, Actor in a Drama Short	Wonderful Day in October	Won

== Election results ==
Year	Elections	Constituency	Political party	Votes (%)	Results
1996	15th National Assembly General Election	Gwangmyeong A (Gyeonggi)	NKP	24,405 (33.30%)	Defeated (2nd)
