= I Am Really Sorry =

- Theatrical poster for I Am Really Sorry (1976)
- Hangul: 진짜 진짜 미안해
- Hanja: 眞짜 眞짜 未安해
- RR: Jinjja jinjja mianhae
- MR: Chintcha chintcha mianhae
- Directed by: Mun Yeo-song
- Written by: Gang Dae-ha; Mun Yeo-song; Kim Ha-rim
- Produced by: Lee Woo-suk
- Starring: Im Ye-jin; Lee Deok-hwa
- Cinematography: Lee Suck-ki
- Edited by: Kim Chang-soon
- Music by: Ma Sang-Won
- Distributed by: Dong A Exports Co., Ltd.
- Release date: November 20, 1976
- Running time: 80 minutes
- Country: South Korea
- Language: Korean

I Am Really Sorry (Korean: 진짜 진짜 미안해; RR: Jinjja jinjja mianhae; lit. 'I'm Really Really Sorry') is a 1976 South Korean film directed by Mun Yeo-song. It is the 2nd movie in the "Really Really" series, the 1st being Never Forget Me (1976) which was released earlier that same year, and also starred Im Ye-jin and Lee Deok-hwa.

== Synopsis ==
Jung-ah keeps close to her heart, the memory of a boy who was injured while saving her from a serious bicycle accident when she was 9 years old. Now teenagers, they are reunited when Jung-ah and her friends encounter a crisis. Tae-il, who has become a thug, saves her once again and remembers her too, but is wrongfully accused and sent to a detention center. Jung-ah realises that Tae-il had developed a deep scar and blindness in one eye due to the incident and thinks that he became a juvenile delinquent due to these circumstances. Feeling sorry and responsible, she resolves to repay him by helping him in his life. She later also discovers that the incident had caused even more serious and life-changing problems for him and his family. Tae-il has difficulty adjusting to his new life and following rules but with Jung-ah's persistent care, grows to stay out of trouble, respect himself and show concern for her. Gradually, the two become friends and develop a close relationship.

== Cast ==
- Im Ye-jin as Hwang Jung-ah
- Lee Deok-hwa as Song Tae-il
- Kim Bok-sun
- Lee Gyeong-jae
- Go Wa-ra
- Park Hui-suk
- Jo Tae-yun
- Choi Chang-yol
- Jeong Tae-seon
- No Yeong-gyu
