= Never Forget Me =

- Theatrical poster for Never Forget Me (1976)
- Hangul: 진짜 진짜 잊지마
- Hanja: 眞짜 眞짜 잊지마
- RR: Jinjja jinjja itjima
- MR: Chintcha chintcha itchima
- Directed by: Mun Yeo-song
- Written by: Seo In-gyeong
- Produced by: Lee Woo-suk
- Starring: Im Ye-jin; Lee Deok-hwa
- Cinematography: Hong Dong-hyuk
- Edited by: Hyeon Dong-chun
- Music by: Yun Chae-hyeon
- Distributed by: Dong A Exports Co., Ltd.
- Release date: February 14, 1976
- Running time: 93 minutes
- Country: South Korea
- Language: Korean

Never Forget Me (Korean: 진짜 진짜 잊지마; lit. 'Really Really Don't Forget') is a 1976 South Korean film directed by Mun Yeo-song. It is the 1st movie in the "Really Really" series and was followed later that same year by the 2nd movie I Am Really Sorry, also starring Im Ye-jin and Lee Deok-hwa.

== Synopsis ==
Two high school students have romantic feelings for each other at a time when such relationships are not allowed at their age. Traveling together by train to school every day, they promise to spend their future together. However, they are separated when the boy's family has to move to Seoul, and vow to be reunited as adults. 3 years later, the boy has become an adult and finally has the independence to pursue his heart. He returns to visit the girl but discovers that she has died from pneumonia. He rides the train they took together and reminisces their past.

== Cast ==
- Im Ye-jin as Jung-ah
- Lee Deok-hwa as Young-soo
- Shin Goo as Young-soo's older brother
- Mun Oh-jang: Jung-ah's father
- Kim Yun-gyeong: Miss Muntae
- Yun Hee
- Lee Chang-won
- Kim Bok-sun: Yeong Suk
- Kim Ung
- Han Tae-il

== Bibliography ==
=== English ===
- Never Forget Me at IMDb
- Never Never Forget Me at the Korean Movie Database (in Korean)

=== Korean ===
- 진짜 진짜 잊지마 (in Korean). Cine21.
- 진짜 진짜 잊지마 (1976) (in Korean). Korean Movie Database (KMDb).
