= Im Ye-jin =

South Korean actress (born 1960)

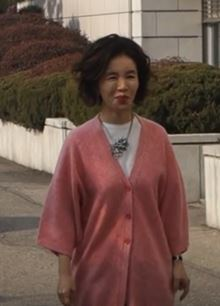
- Im in March 2019
- Born: Im Ki-hee; January 24, 1960 (age 66); Seoul, South Korea
- Education: Dongguk University (Theater and Film)
- Occupation: Actress
- Years active: 1974–present
- Spouse: Choi Chang-wook (m. 1989)
- Children: 1

Korean name
- Hangul: 임기희
- RR: Im Gihui
- MR: Im Kihŭi

Stage name
- Hangul: 임예진
- Hanja: 林藝眞
- RR: Im Yejin
- MR: Im Yejin

Im Ki-hee (Korean: 임기희; born January 24, 1960), known professionally as Im Ye-jin (임예진), is a South Korean actress. Affectionately called the original "Nation's Little Sister", Im debuted as a teenage actress taking on roles of the "pretty teenage student" in several movies and TV series – helping her win the title of everyone's favorite "dongseng" (동생; lit. 'younger sibling') in her time. She reached the peak of her popularity in the 1970s with the "Really Really" film trilogy, which includes Never Forget Me (1976), I Am Really Sorry (1976) and I Really Really Like You. She is currently active in television.

== Career ==
Im Ki-hee began modeling in popular teen magazines when she was in junior high school. Using the stage name Im Ye-jin, she made her acting debut in Kim Ki-young's Transgression in 1974.

In 1975, Im played a high schooler in love with her teacher in Graduating School Girls, for which she won Best New Actress at the Grand Bell Awards. But it was a year later when she would be catapulted to stardom. Im headlined Never Forget Me (also known as Really Really Don't Forget, 1976) and its sequels I Am Really Sorry (also known as I'm Really Really Sorry, 1976) and Crazy For You (also known as I Really Really Like You, 1977) -- movies about teenage friendship, romance, and aspirations that became massive box office hits, screening to sold-out theaters. In an era when Korean cinema was in a dark period resulting from severe censorship by an authoritarian government, this led to the emergence of the teenage demographic as a major consumer of pop culture. Im had an innocent, girlish image, whose acting was charming and sweet without being saccharine, and she became hugely popular among middle school and high school students; girls wanted to be like her, and boys had her picture in their pockets. The "Really Really" series established Im as the most popular young actress of that period, and for the next several years, youth melodramas starring her dominated the theaters in quick succession, often with Lee Deok-hwa as her leading man: Prayer of a Girl (1976), Ever So Much Good! (1976), I Really Have a Dream (1976), I've Never Felt Like This Before (1976), and Nobody Knows (1977).

Im entered college in 1979, studying Theater and Film at Dongguk University. By this time, she wanted to transition out of teen movies, and into more adult roles. She starred opposite Shin Seong-il in Love Song in a Peanut Shell, but it was poorly received, with audiences not prepared to see her break out of her "pure" image. Despite a supporting role in A Fine, Windy Day, Im's film career was in a slump, so she shifted her focus to television and radio in the 1980s.

After a few years of forgettable television dramas, Im's career was revitalized by Kim Soo-hyun, one of the most famous TV writers in Korea. Among Kim's dramas that Im starred in were 사랑합시다 (1981), Yesterday and Tomorrow (1982), Love and Truth (1984), Love and Ambition (1987), Farewell (1994), and Childless Comfort (2012). In Farewell, she shocked audiences by playing a Fatal Attraction-esque villain for the first time. Im also played the character Dal-soo in a series of one-act dramas for MBC Best Theater from 1995 to 2005.

As Im grew older, she remained active on television and the occasional film, in supporting roles as ajummas, aunts or mothers. As if coming full circle, she played one of the adult characters in a 2010 musical theatre adaptation of her early hit I Really Really Like You.

From 2008 to 2010, Im was a popular panelist on the variety show Quiz to Change the World, for which she was recognized at the MBC Entertainment Awards.

In 2014, Im signed with the talent agency YG Entertainment. In December 2019, it was confirmed that her contract with YG Entertainment has expired and decided not to renew.

== Personal life ==
In 1989, Im married Choi Chang-wook, a TV director and producer at MBC.

== Filmography ==
=== Film ===
- Transgression (1974)
- Red Shoes (1975)
- Graduating School Girls (1975)
- Really Really Don't Forget (1976)
- Prayer of a Girl (1976)
- Ever So Much Good! (1976)
- I Really Have a Dream (1976)
- Blue Classroom (1976)
- I'm Really Really Sorry (1976)
- I've Never Felt Like This Before (1976)
- Angry Apple (1977)
- When We Grow Up... (1977)
- The First Snow (1977)
- Goodbye, Sir! (1977)
- The Double Rainbow Hill (1977)
- I Really Really Like You (1977)
- Our World (1977)
- Nobody Knows (1977)
- Fire (1978)
- Cheerful High School Class (1978)
- The Hey Days of Youth 77 (1979)
- Love Song in a Peanut Shell (1979)
- A Fine, Windy Day (1980)
- Love's Scribble (1988)
- Crack of the Halo (1998)
- The Classic (2003)
- Windstruck (2004)
- Ssunday Seoul (2006)
- Dasepo Naughty Girls (2006)
- Miss Gold Digger (2007)
- My Mighty Princess (2008)
- Secret Love (2010)
- Trade Your Love (2019)

=== Television series ===
- Jade Flute (TBC, 1975)
- By Ear (MBC, 1975)
- Third Class (MBC, 1977)
- The Spring Maiden Has Come (MBC, 1977)
- South Wind (MBC, 1978)
- X Search Party (MBC, 1978)
- Frugal Family (MBC, 1979)
- White Dandelion (MBC, 1979)
- Anguk-dong Madam (MBC, 1980)
- Han River (MBC, 1981)
- Let's Love (MBC, 1981)
- Yesterday and Tomorrow (MBC, 1982)
- Friend, My Friend (MBC, 1982)
- Sunflower in Winter (MBC, 1983)
- Love and Truth (MBC, 1984)
- First Love (MBC, 1986)
- Love and Ambition (MBC, 1987)
- Peers and Turi (MBC, 1988)
- Legacy (MBC, 1989)
- Sunrise (KBS2, 1989)
- Last Place Search Party (MBC, 1990)
- Freezing Point (KBS2, 1990)
- Ancient Geum Jan-di (KBS1, 1991)
- A Rainy Afternoon (KBS2, 1991)
- Mozart the Janitor (KBS1, 1992)
- Professor Oh's Family (SBS, 1993)
- Mountain Wind (MBC, 1993)
- Farewell (SBS, 1994)
- Partner (MBC, 1994–1997)
- Love and Marriage (MBC, 1995)
- MBC Best Theater – "Dal-su's Trial" (MBC, 1995)
- MBC Best Theater – "Dal-su's House Building" (MBC, 1995)
- Three Kingdoms (KBS2, 1996)
- MBC Best Theater – "Dalsu's Son Goes to School" (MBC, 1996)
- MBC Best Theater – "Dal-su's Tea" (MBC, 1996)
- MBC Best Theater – "Golden Garden" (MBC, 1996)
- OK Ranch (SBS, 1997)
- MBC Best Theater – "Dal-su Breaks the Filial Piety Law" (MBC, 1997)
- MBC Best Theater – "Dal-su's Alone Arirang" (MBC, 1997)
- To Love Is (EBS, 1998)
- See and See Again (MBC, 1998)
- Crush (KBS2, 1998)
- MBC Best Theater – "Dal-su, Hit by a Boomerang" (MBC, 1999)
- LA Arirang (SBS, 2000)
- Blue Mist (KBS2, 2001)
- Wonderful Days (SBS, 2001)
- Affection (SBS, 2002)
- Honest Living (SBS, 2002)
- MBC Best Theater – "Run, Manager Jang" (MBC, 2002)
- MBC Best Theater – "Do You Love Me?" (MBC, 2003)
- People of the Water Flower Village (MBC, 2004)
- Full House (KBS2, 2004)
- Ireland (MBC, 2004)
- MBC Best Theater – "Dal-su, Tutoring His Son" (MBC, 2004)
- Love and Sympathy (SBS, 2005)
- MBC Best Theater – "Dal-su, Caught in the Special Prostitution Law" (MBC, 2005)
- Princess Hours (MBC, 2006)
- Which Star Are You From (MBC, 2006)
- MBC Best Theater – "A Walk Around The Neighborhood" (MBC, 2006)
- Winter Bird (MBC, 2007)
- Little Mom Scandal (CGV, 2008)
- Lawyers of the Great Republic of Korea (MBC, 2008)
- Little Mom Scandal 2 (CGV, 2008)
- Boys over Flowers (KBS2, 2009)
- The Road Home (KBS1, 2009)
- Queen Seondeok (MBC, 2009)
- Life Is Good (MBC, 2009)
- Life Is Beautiful (SBS, 2010) (cameo)
- You Don't Know Women (SBS, 2010)
- Smile, Mom (SBS, 2010)
- My Princess (MBC, 2011)
- Sweet Palpitations (KBS2, 2011)
- Romance Town (KBS2, 2011)
- Iron Daughters-in-Law (MBC, 2011)
- Immortal Classic (Channel A, 2012)
- My Kids Give Me a Headache (jTBC, 2012)
- 7th Grade Civil Servant (MBC, 2013)
- Princess Aurora (MBC, 2013)
- Miss Korea (MBC, 2013)
- Can We Fall in Love, Again? (jTBC, 2014)
- Marriage, Not Dating (tvN, 2014)
- Rosy Lovers (MBC, 2014)
- The Producers (KBS2, 2015)
- Splash Splash Love (MBC, 2015)
- Yeah, That's How It Is (SBS, 2016)
- The Liar and His Lover (tvN, 2017)
- Hit the Top (KBS2, 2017)
- A Korean Odyssey (tvN / 2017–2018) - Bangmooljangsoo (peddler)
- My Only One (KBS2, 2018)
- Lie After Lie (Channel A, 2020)
- Young Lady and Gentleman (KBS2, 2021)
- Beauty and Mr. Romantic (KBS2, 2024) - So Geum-ja, Pil-sung's grandma

=== Variety show ===
- MBC Campus Song Festival (1978, 1979, 1981) - MC
- 영11 (MBC, 1981–1982) - MC
- My Mom's the Best (GTV, 1995) - MC
- Truth Game (SBS, 2005–2007) - panelist
- Lee Jae-yong and Im Ye-jin's Good Day (MBC, 2006–2007) - MC
- Vitamin (KBS2, 2006–2007) - panelist
- Oasis (SBS, 2008) - MC
- Quiz to Change the World (MBC, 2008–2010) - panelist
- Sunday Sunday Night Parody Theater "Temptation of the Legacy of the Queen of Housewives" (MBC, 2009)
- King of Mask Singer (MBC, 2017) – Contestant as "The Goal Is Marriage Report Juliet" (episode 99)

=== Music video appearances ===
- T-ara - "Roly-Poly" (2011)
- Joo Hyun-mi and Seohyun - "Jjarajajja" (2009)
- Psy feat. Snoop Dogg - "Hangover" (2014)

=== Radio program ===
- The Lee Deok-hwa and Im Ye-jin Show (TBC Radio, 1978–1979)
- Song Chang-ho and Im Ye-jin's Ode to Youth (MBC Radio, 1980–1981)
- Hopeful Music at Noon (MBC Radio, 1980–1984)

== Theater ==
- I Really Really Like You (2010)

== Awards ==
- 1975 Grand Bell Awards: Best New Actress (Graduating School Girls)
- 2007 MBC Drama Awards: Best TV Host (Good Day)
- 2008 MBC Entertainment Awards: Best Entertainer Award (Quiz to Change the World)
- 2009 MBC Entertainment Awards: Female Excellence Award in Variety (Quiz to Change the World)
