= The Korean Christian Advocate =

1897–1915 weekly newspaper in Korea

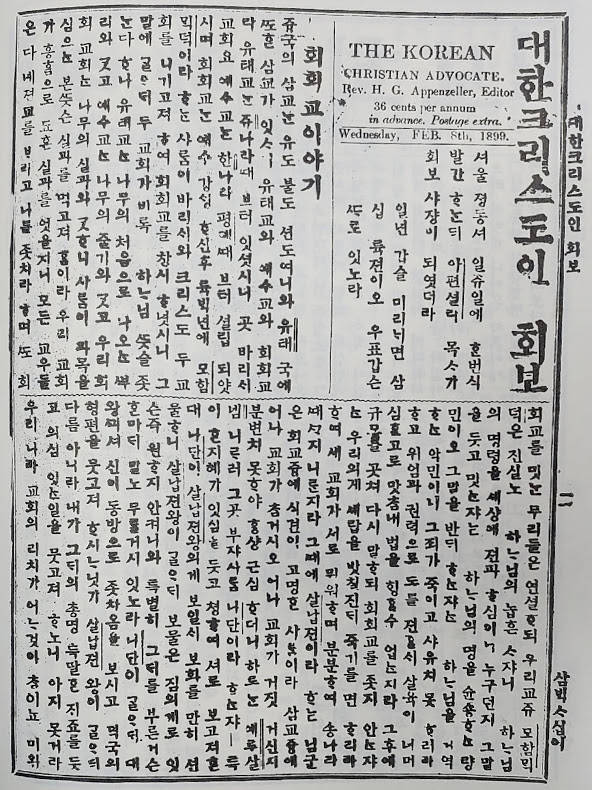
- Cover of the February 8, 1899 issue
- Founder: Henry Appenzeller
- Publisher: Trilingual Press
- Editor: Henry Appenzeller
- Founded: February 2, 1897
- Ceased publication: 1915
- Language: Korean (Hangul)
- City: Seoul
- Country: Joseon, Korean Empire
- Circulation: 800 (as of 1898)

The Korean Christian Advocate (Korean: 죠선크리스도인회보) was a weekly Korean-language newspaper published in Korea from 1897 to 1900 and 1910 to 1915. It was a Methodist Christian publication and the first religious newspaper to be published in Korea.

The newspaper changed Korean names a number of times. It was founded as 죠선크리스도인회보, changed to 대한그리스도인회보 in 1897, then shut down in 1900. Its former capabilities were merged into the non-denominational paper The Christian News, but the two separated again in 1910, and it used the Korean name 그리스도회보. The two papers merged again in 1915, which resulted in the Kidok Sinbo. That paper lasted until 1937.

== History ==
Christianity, modern technology, and Western culture were still uncommon in Korea by the late 1800s. In 1896, an article entitled "The Literary Needs of Korea" was published in the journal The Korean Repository. It argued for the need in creating more Christian Korean-language literature.

The newspaper published its first issue on February 2, 1897. Its founder and editor was American missionary Henry Appenzeller. The newspaper's staff included George Heber Jones, Louisa Christina Rothweiler, Ch'oe Pyŏng-hŏn, and Song Ki-yong (송기용; 宋奇用). It was published out of the Chungdong First Methodist Church in Seoul.

The newspaper was founded ten months after the founding of the first private Korean newspaper Tongnip sinmun, and possibly took inspiration from it, as the two papers were both in pure Hangul. The paper was closely related to The Christian News, another Korean-language newspaper which was founded shortly afterwards by Presbyterian missionaries and printed by the same publisher (Trilingual Press). However, The Christian News' founder Horace Grant Underwood wanted his publication to be less overtly Christian than The Korean Christian Advocate.

The number of pages in each issue increased over time. It went from 4, 6, then 8 pages. The newspaper covered a variety of topics, including non-religious, which led to it having non-Christian subscribers. It emphasized introducing Koreans to the outside world, as Korea had been isolationist until quite recently. It promoted anti-war and anti-colonialist views, and promoted gender equality. Articles were often written in English first, then translated into Korean by the Korean staff. Korean Christians would sometimes contribute their own articles to the paper. It had a circulation of around 800 copies, which represented significant market share among weekly periodicals in Korea at the time, which totalled 2,500 around 1898.

The newspaper was skeptically monitored by the Korean government. Correspondingly, the paper rarely wrote critically about Korean traditional religious practices. It even issued praise towards the Korean monarch Gojong's ritual sacrifice and declaration of the Korean Empire. The Korean government was not uniform in its skepticism of Christianity; Gojong was receptive towards it.

It changed its Korean name (죠선크리스도인회보 to 대한그리스도인회보) on December 8, 1897, for its 45th issue. However, Appenzeller returned to the United States around 1900, and the newspaper virtually stopped publishing. It published its final issue on August 28, 1900. In 1905, its capabilities were merged into that of The Christian News, which continued publishing.

The paper split off of The Christian News in 1910, and was published under the Korean name 그리스도회보. It published until 1915, after which it reunified with The Christian News and was succeeded by Kidok Sinbo.

== See also ==
- Christianity in Korea
- List of newspapers in Korea (before 1945)
- History of newspapers in Korea
