= Chungdong First Methodist Church =

Oldest extant church in Korea

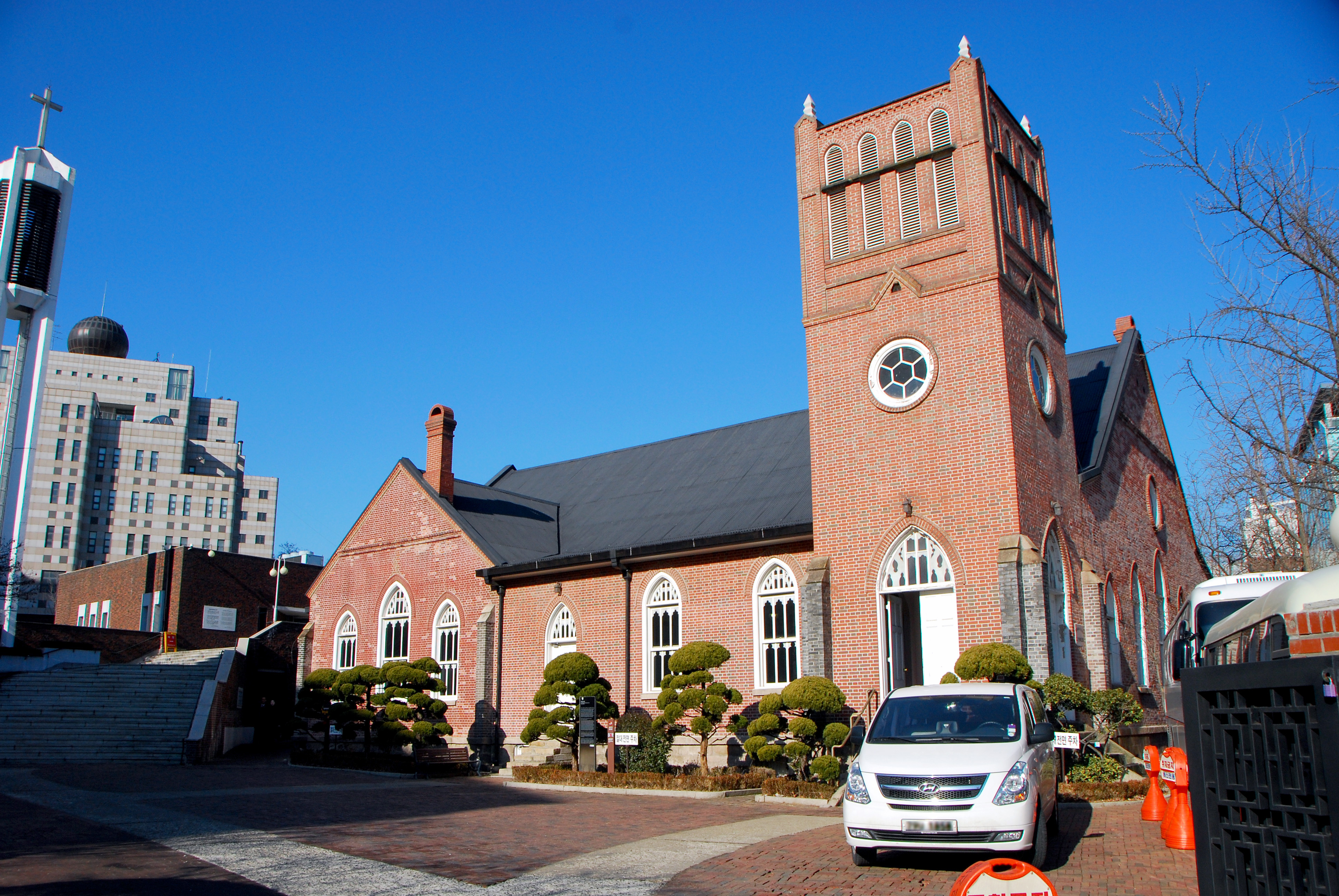
- Chungdong First Methodist Church
- 37°33′56″N 126°58′20″E
- Location: 46 Jeongdong-gil, Jung District, Seoul, South Korea
- Website: www.chungdongfmc.com (in English)

History
- Founded: October 11, 1885

Architecture
- Heritage designation: Historic Sites of South Korea
- Designated: 1977-11-22
- Completed: December 26, 1897

Chungdong First Methodist Church (Korean: 정동제일교회; Hanja: 貞洞第一敎會) is a historic church in Jeong-dong, Jung District, Seoul, South Korea.

The church claims a number of historic firsts within Korea. It is the first Methodist church and one of the earliest Protestant churches, as its congregation (albeit in a different building) was founded on October 11, 1885. In Korea, the church performed the first Methodist baptism on July 24, 1887, started the first Christian women's group in 1889, had the first pipe organ, and built the first Western-style chapel. The church's first building was built in 1897, and is the oldest extant church in Korea, as well as the only one originally built during the 19th century.

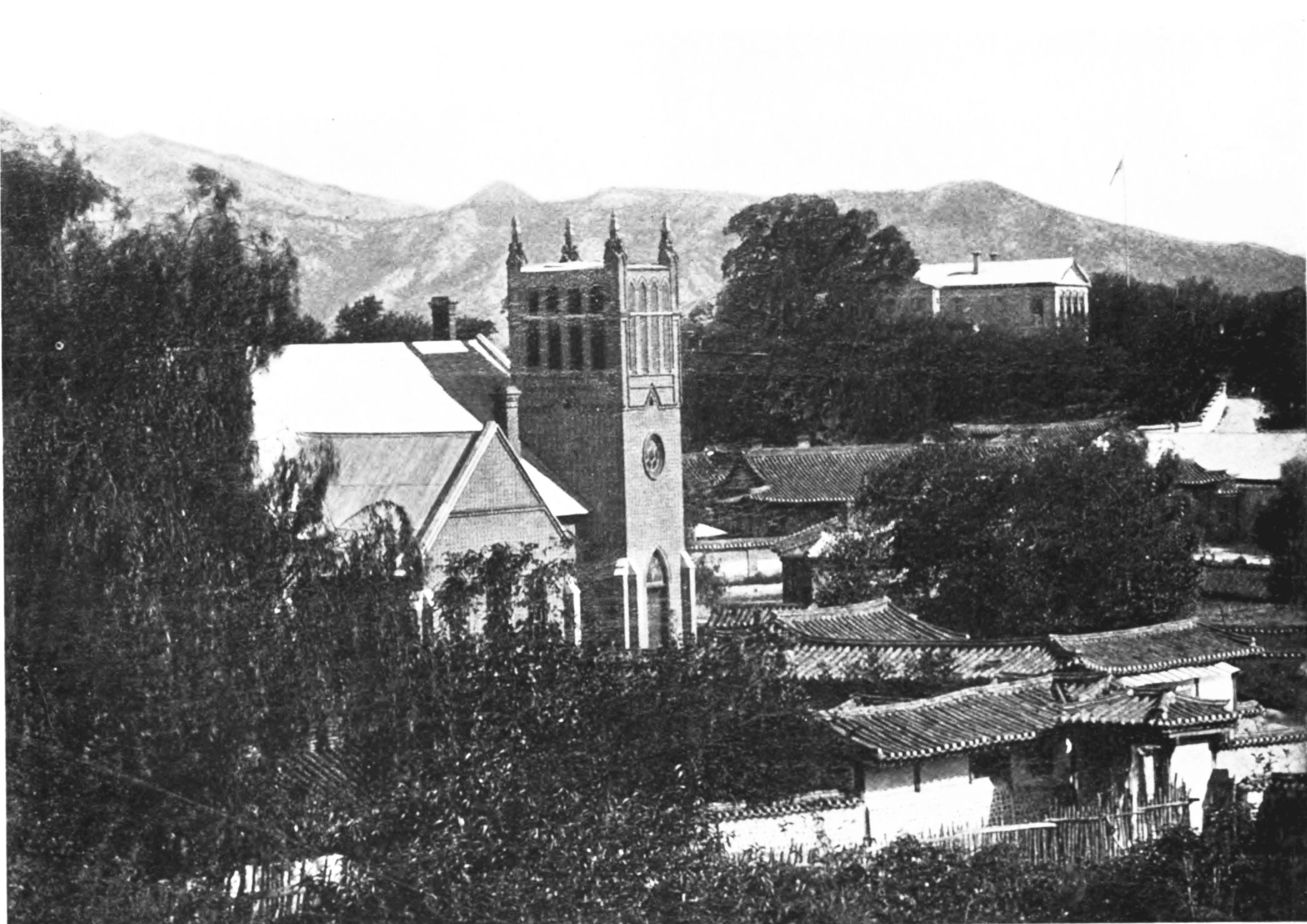
The church (c. 1900)

The church was founded by American missionary Henry Appenzeller. In September 1887, he purchased a small hanok (traditional Korean house) to house the church, and deemed the building "Bethel Chapel". As the congregation grew, the church leadership decided to construct a larger building. The groundbreaking ceremony was held on September 9, 1895, with notable Korean leaders Soh Kwang-pom and Yun Chi-ho present. A dedication service was held for the new building on December 26, 1897, which they also dubbed "Bethel Chapel". The church was expanded in 1926, changing from a cruciform (cross-shaped) church to a rectangular building.

The newspaper served as the headquarters for several early publications in Korea, and was host to the Trilingual Press publisher. Publications include Tongnip sinmun (first private newspaper in Korea), The Korean Christian Advocate (first Christian newspaper in Korea), The Christian News, and The Korean Repository (first English-language monthly magazine). The church acquired the first privately owned printing press in Korea for these publications.

The architecture is a simplified American gothic style, with arched window frames. Bethel Chapel was made Historic Site of South Korea No. 277 in 1977.

It currently holds worship services in both Korean and English. It also maintains a Mangon Christian History Reference Room for historical materials. The church opened a history museum on November 12, 2023.

== See also ==
- Korean Methodist Church
