= Korean immigration to Hawaii =

Immigration in Hawaii to 1903–present

Kōlea, Kōrea
Total population
- 48,699 (2010)

Regions with significant populations

Languages
- English, Korean

Religion
- Presbyterianism, Methodism, Buddhism

Hawaii has been a notable destination for Korean immigration to the United States since the early 20th century.

== Origins ==
The very first large group of Korean immigrants arrived in the United States on January 13, 1903. The Korean Empire had issued its first English-language passports to these immigrants the previous year. They travelled on the RMS Gaelic and landed in Hawaii. The group consisted of 56 men recruited as laborers for sugarcane plantations located on various islands in the Territory of Hawaii, as well as 21 women and 25 children. Within two years of the first arrival of Korean immigrants, the number of Koreans who had migrated to Hawaii had grown to more than 7,000.

Between 1901 and 1905, 7,226 immigrants, including 6,048 men, 637 women, and 541 children, came to Hawaii over 65 trips. Most of the early immigrants of that period had some contracts with American missionaries in Korea. For some Western-oriented Korean intellectuals, immigrating to the United States was considered useful mainly to help them in the modernization of their homeland.

According to Dr. Wayne Patterson, during his speech to the Royal Asiatic Society, the transfer of Koreans to Hawaii was against the US Emigration Laws regarding foreign Contract Laborers. The HSPA enlisted Dr. Horace Allen, the American minister in Seoul, to coordinate the emigration of Koreans to Hawaii and to ensure that the Hawaiian plantations received Korean laborers. Together with American entrepreneur, David Deshler, Allen moved forward to secure passage for Koreans to Hawaii.

By mid-November 1905, Allen had successfully petitioned to Emperor Gojong, who in issued an edict creating a Department of Emigration. A new branch of the Korean government had been successfully made, but the issue of funding passage to Hawaii still remained. Before annexation, passage across the Pacific was paid for by plantation owners, in return for three years of contract labor. With the practice now outlawed, Allen and Deshler created the Deshler Bank with the $25,000 that Deshler brought to Korea. The bank would then loan the Planters money to emigrants wanting passage to Hawaii, brokering illegal passage money and circumventing U.S. immigration laws.

== Subsequent history ==
Within a century the Korean population in America grew rapidly, from roughly seven thousand to about two million.

King Gojong (1852–1919) reigned in Korea at the time of the first migration to America and played a crucial part in the lives of Koreans abroad. Christian missionaries had found their way to Korea during King Gojong's reign. By the 1890s, American missionaries were the most influential in spreading Christianity in Korea. Dr. Horace Allen, missionary-turned-diplomat, was embroiled in Korean politics and in effect was the representative for American trade. The missionaries brought not only Christianity, but also capitalism, Western learning, and Western culture. Many of the immigrants had converted to Christianity.

Protestant evangelism in Korea was predominantly Methodist and Presbyterian. The two Protestant groups decided not to overlap their evangelizing activities. They agreed that the Methodist mission in Hawaii would minister to the Korean immigrants.

Korea's first formal treaty with America was in May 1882. The treaty was preceded by America's forgotten "little war" of bloody exchanges between the two countries. The little-known episode in American history involved a heavily armed American ship, the Colorado, entering Korean waters and landing its soldiers on Ganghwa Island. A battle ensued in which more than three hundred Koreans and three American soldiers were killed.

The Americans later returned pursuing a treaty, resulting in the Treaty of Amity and Commerce in 1882. Among other things, the treaty contained a provision allowing Korean immigration to America. The first group of immigrants came from Rev. George Heber Jones' Methodist parish in Jemulpo (Inchon).

- Immigrants prior to 1903: Historical statistics of Hawaii indicate there were sixteen Koreans in the Territory of Hawaii in 1902. Some are said to have been ginseng merchants in disguise who came using Chinese passports. One of these ginseng merchants was Choo Eun Yang, who came to Hawaii and transmigrated to San Francisco around 1898. He became active in the Korean community there, became prosperous, and lived to the age of 102. Among other immigrants, Sung Pong Chang worked for the Circuit Court of Hawaii and for the Honolulu Police Department as an interpreter until he died in 1949.
- Four famous Korean immigrants: Dr. Philip Jaisohn (1866–1951), Dr. Syngman Rhee (1875–1965), Dosan Ahn Chang Ho (1878–1938), and Young Man Pak (1877–1928). See also List of notable Korean Americans in Hawaii.

== Legacy ==
On January 13, 2003, George W. Bush made a special proclamation honoring the Centennial of Korean Immigration to the United States, recognizing the contributions of Korean Americans to the nation.

== Koreatown ==
Korean businesses congregate on Ke‘eaumoku Street, which earned the nickname "Koreamoku." Although it has not been officially designated as a Koreatown, the Koreatown designation has been considered by the State of Hawaii within the past few years. With recent gentrification and condominiums pricing out Korean merchants in the Ke'eaumoku district, a new Koreatown is emerging in downtown Honolulu.

== Notable Korean Americans in Hawaii ==
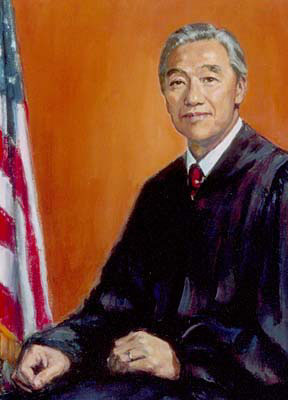
Herbert Choy

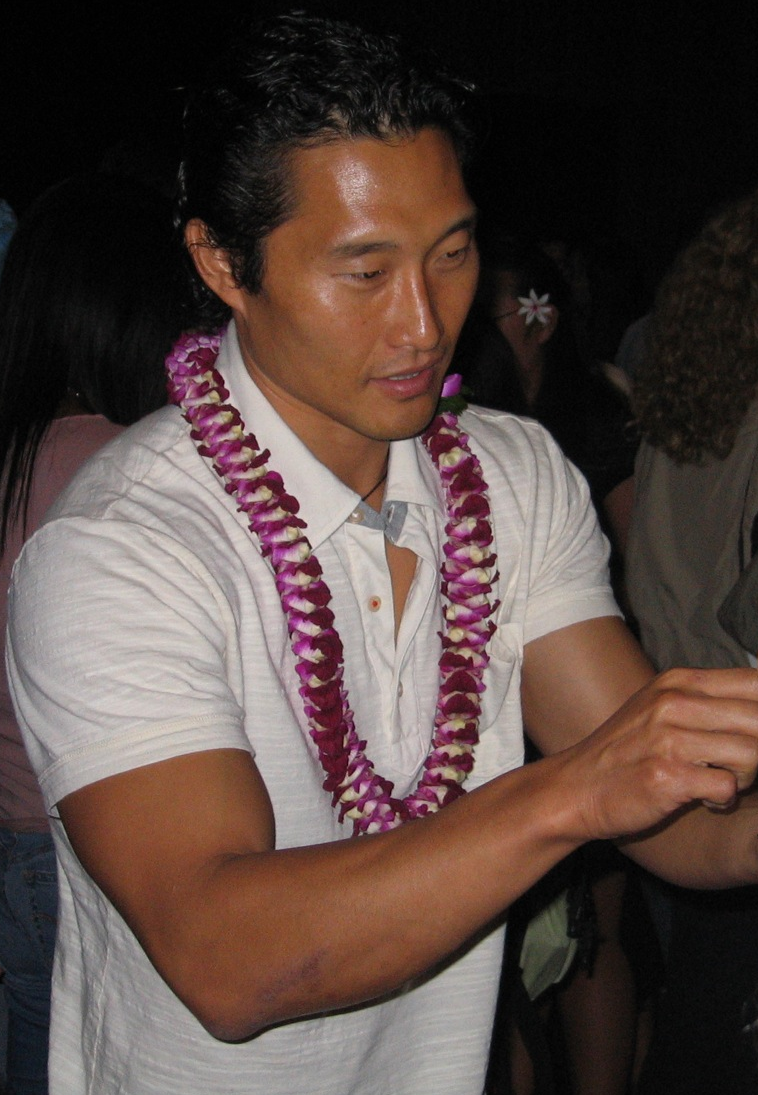
Daniel Dae Kim

- Philip Jaisohn (1866–1951)
- Syngman Rhee (Korean: 이승만; 李承晩) (1875–1965), the first President of South Korea
- Young Man Pak (1877–1928)
- Brook Lee, Miss Universe 1997
- Herbert Young Cho Choy (Korean: 최영조) (1916–2004) was the first Asian American federal judge in the history of the United States, as well as the first person of Korean ancestry to be admitted to practice law in the United States.
- Harry Kim (born 1939) was the mayor of Hawaii County from 2000 to 2008 and 2016–2020.
- Ronald Moon (Korean: 문대양) (1940–2022) was the Chief Justice of the Hawaii State Supreme Court.
- Sylvia Luke (Korean: 장은정) (born 1967) is the 16th Lieutenant Governor of Hawaii and the first Korean American politician ever elected to a statewide office in the United States.
- Daniel Dae Kim (born 1968) is a Korean American actor, best known for playing Jin-Soo Kwon on the television series Lost and played the role of Chin Ho Kelly on Hawaii Five-0.
- JoAnne S. Bass (born 1974) served as the nineteenth Chief Master Sergeant of the Air Force, the first female to hold the highest senior enlisted rank in any United States military branch and the first person of Asian-American descent to hold the highest senior enlisted position in the Air Force.
- Jay Dee "B.J." Penn (born 1978) is a Korean-American professional mixed martial arts (MMA) fighter and Jiu-Jitsu practitioner, former Ultimate Fighting Championship lightweight champion.
- Nodie Kimhaekim Sohn, (1898–1972), Korean-American church and community leader
- Michelle Sung Wie (/ˈwiː/; Korean: Wie Seong-mi; 위성미; 魏聖美) (born 1989) is a Korean-American professional golfer. In 2006, she was named in a Time magazine article, "one of 100 people who shape our world."
- Bekah (Korean: 베카) (born 1989), member of Korean girl-group After School
- Julie Han (born 2000), member of Korean girl-group Kiss of Life

== See also ==
- Filipinos in Hawaii
- Japanese in Hawaii
- Chinese immigration to Hawaii
- Puerto Rican immigration to Hawaii
