= Ko Jinha =

South Korean poet (born 1953)

- 모월산인
- Born: 1953 (age 72–73); Yeongwol, Gangwon-do, South Korea
- Education: Methodist Theological University
- Occupations: Writer, pastor

Ko Jinha (Korean: 고진하; born 1953) is a South Korean Methodist pastor and poet. He has published multiple essay collections, poetry collections, and biblical stories for children. His poetry explores the sanctity inherent in all living things on Earth and continue forth into affirmation of life. After becoming a farmer to live a life enjoying inconveniences and unhappiness, he has been giving lectures about sustainable living.

== Life ==
=== Childhood and writing ===
Ko was born in Yeongwol in 1953. He suffered from polio when he was two years old and was ridiculed for his limp through his childhood. He had difficulty socializing with people and spent most of his time after school at church and grew up introverted and ascetic as a result. He enrolled in Methodist Theological University and spent his 20s troubled by a sense of emptiness. He thirsted for poetry and fiction while studying rigid theology, and when Ko Junghee, who was a student at another theological school, made her literary debut as a poet, he invited her to a school festival. Afterward, he began to compose poetry in earnest and spent 10 years writing. Eventually, in 1987, he made his literary debut when five of his poems including "Bindeul" (빈들 Empty Fields) were published.

=== A Poet and a religious Leader ===
Even after his poetic debut, Ko served as a pastor in different areas of Gangwon Province. He learned to see the world with a warm gaze while spending time with the people of agricultural towns, and his poetry gradually became more positive. Experiencing God in nature, he became absorbed in various religious texts, such as Upanishads or those written by Laozi or Zhuangzi. After his pilgrimage to India in 2002, he was fascinated by the landscape and spirituality he experienced in India and wrote a book of his travels to India titled Sindeurui nara, ingenui ttang (신들의 나라, 인간의 땅 The Country of Gods, The Land of People) (2009). To lead a life enjoying inconveniences and unhappiness, he moved to a remote mountain village in Gangwon Province and built a hanok . During the day, he repairs old hanok or cultivates his vegetable garden; in the evenings he reads and writes. He is actively giving lectures at universities and libraries on the topic of sustainable life.

His major poetry collections include Jiguem nameun jadeurui goljjagien (지금 남은 자들의 골짜기엔 In the Valley of Those Who Remain Today) (1990), Peurancheseukoui saedeul (프란체스코의 새들 Francesco's Birds) (1999), Eoreum sudowon (얼음수도원 Ice Monastery) (2001), and Myeongnangui dulle (명랑의 둘레 The Circumference of Joviality) (2015). In addition, he also published a number of essay collections, including Si ilgeojuneun yesu (시 읽어주는 예수 Jesus Reading Poetry) (2015) and Japcho chiyu bapsang (잡초 치유 밥상 A Healing Table of Weeds) (2017). He also wrote a number of children's books that retell the stories in the Bible.

== Writing ==
=== Early works of poetry ===
In Ko Jinha's early poems, there is a notable attitude of enduring existential suffering in the absence of God. Jiguem nameun jadeurui goljjagien (1990) depicts the desolate reality of farming towns he witnessed while working as an evangelist in Gangwon Province. The images of empty fields that are prevalent in the poetry collection symbolizes the barrenness of humans in a world devoid of God. Peurancheseukoui saedeul (1993) paints the existential pain of humans with frightening images. In verses, such as "Slitting the rotting, decaying intestines/to look for precious treasure/that will slip and slide out" (용연향 Yongyeonhyang), the poet struggles to confront suffering squarely in the eye. It is an attempt to embrace the world and fight, while acknowledging that human existence must coexist with suffering.

=== Shift in poetic style ===
A shift in Ko Jinha's world of poetry is noticeable starting with Ujubaekkop (우주배꼽 The Universe's Bellybutton) (1997). Suffering still prevails in the world, and there are always wars being waged somewhere in the world. But in "Jangma" (장마 Rainy Season), the poet who hears the news of a war thinks of Calvary where Jesus died and names the hill "the universe's bellybutton." In this rhetorical question ("There,/you can still hear/the cry of newborns?") is the will to embrace the painful reality with the arms of nature. When observing and contemplating on the ways of the universe, God is no longer absent but is rediscovered as an omnipresent existence in our daily lives.

Ko's attitude of looking for sanctity inherent in all living things leads to an open and pluralistic attitude toward religion. Buddhist elements, such as bodhisattvas, Buddhist temple bells, lotus, and Sahasrabhuja, often appear in Eoreum sudowon (2001). In the poem "Hapjang" (합장 Namaskar) published in Sutak (수탉 Rooster) (2005), he even wrote "Buddha and Jesus are living together in one body." Through a new theology that does not insist on any kind of boundaries, the sanctity of all living things traverse each other and gradually become one.

== Works ==
=== 1. Collection of works ===
《호랑나비 돛배》, 지식을만드는지식, 2012 / Horangnabi dotbae (A Boat With A Tiger Swallowtail Sail), Jisikgeul Mandeuneun Jisik, 2012.

=== 2. Collections ===
《지금 남은 자들의 골짜기엔》, 민음사, 1990 / Jigeum nameun jadeurui goljjagien (In the Valley of Those Who Remain Today), Minumsa, 1990.

《프란체스코의 새들》, 문학과지성사, 1993 / Peurancheseukoui saedeul (Francesco's Birds), Moonji, 1993.

《우주배꼽》, 세계사, 1997 / Ujubaekkop (The Universe's Bellybutton), Segyesa, 1997.

《얼음수도원》, 민음사, 2001 / Eoreum sudowon (Ice Monastery), Minumsa, 2001.

《수탉》, 민음사, 2005 / Sutak (Rooster), Minumsa, 2005.

《거룩한 낭비》, 뿔, 2011 / Georukhan nangbi (Holy Waste), Ppul, 2011.

《호랑나비 돛배》, 지식을만드는지식, 2012 / Horangnabi dotbae (A Boat With A Tiger Swallowtail Sail), Jisikgeul Mandeuneun Jisik, 2012.

《꽃 먹는 소》, 문예중앙, 2013 / Kkot meongneun so (Flower-Eating Cow), Munye Joongang, 2013.

《명랑의 둘레》, 문학동네, 2015 / Myeongnangui dulle (The Circumference of Joviality), Munhakdongne, 2015.

=== 3. Novel ===
《소설 하디》, 기독교대한감리회, 2013 / Soseol Hadi (소설 하디 Hardie, a Novel), Korean Methodist Church, 2013.

=== 4. Co-authored books and other collections ===
〈만경창파 위로 띄운 그 노래〉, 고진하 외, 《어머니의 노래》, 시작, 2008 / "Mangyeongchangpa wiro ttuiun geu norae" (The Song I Flew Over the Boundless Expanse of Water), Ko Jinha et al., Oemeoniui norae (Mother's Song), Sijak, 2008.

〈차도르 1-인도 시편〉 외, 안익수 외, 《바깥》, 마음산책, 2012 / "Chadoreu 1 -Indo sipyeon" (Chador 1 – A Poem About India) and others, Ahn Ik-su et al., Bakkat (Outside), Maumsanchaek, 2012.

〈사라진 별똥별처럼〉, 고두현 외, 《굽은 길들이 반짝이며 흘러갔다》, 나무옆의자, 2016/ "Sarajin byeolttongbyeolcheoreom (Like a Vanished Comet), Ko Du-hyeon et al., Gubeun gildeuri banjjagimyeo heulleogatda (Meandering Paths Flowed By Twinkling), Namu Bench, 2016.

〈독수리-김기석에게〉, 고진하 외, 《희망 그 빛깔 있는 삶의 몸부림》, 꽃자리, 2016 / "Doksuri – Kim Gi-seokege" (Eagle – To Kim Gi-seok), Ko Jinha et al., Huimang geu bikkal inneun salmui momburim (Hope, The Colorful Struggle of Life), Kkotjari, 2016.

〈고해(苦海) 속의 고해(告解)〉, 김언 외, 《시는 어떻게 오는가》, 시인동네, 2018 / "Gohae sogui gohae" (Confession in This Bitter World), Kim Eon et al., Sineun eotteoke oneunga (How Does Poetry Come), Seeindongnae, 2018.

=== 5. Children's books ===
고진하 글, 김솔로몬 그림, 《어린이성경 1-하나님이 열어 놓은 세상》, 비룡소, 1994 / Ko Jinha, illustration by Kim Solomon, Eorini seonggyeong 1 – hananimi yeoreo noeun sesang (Children's Bible 1 – A World Opened by God), BIR, 1994.

고진하 글, 김솔로몬 그림, 《어린이성경 2-천사의 사닥다리》, 비룡소, 1994 / Ko Jinha, illustration by Kim Solomon, Eorini seonggyeong 2 – cheonsaui sadakdari (Children's Bible 2 – An Angel's Ladder), BIR, 1994.

고진하 글, 김솔로몬 그림, 《어린이성경 3-젖과 꿀이 흐르는 땅》, 비룡소, 1996 / Ko Jinha, illustration by Kim Solomon, Eorini seonggyeong 3 – jeotgwa kkuri heureuneun ttang (Children's Bible 3 – The Land of Milk and Honey), BIR, 1996.

고진하 글, 김솔로몬 그림, 《어린이성경 4-빈 항아리 속에 감춘 횃불》, 비룡소, 1996 / Ko Jinha, illustration by Kim Solomon, Eorini seonggyeong 4 – bin hangari soge gamchun hwaetbul (Children's Bible 4 – Torches Hidden in Empty Jars), BIR, 1996.

고진하 글, 김솔로몬 그림, 《어린이성경 5-왕이 된 양치기》, 비룡소, 1996 / Ko Jinha, illustration by Kim Solomon, Eorini seonggyeong 5 – wangi doen yangchigi (Children's Bible 5 – A Shepherd Who Became a King), BIR, 1996.

고진하 글, 김솔로몬 그림, 《어린이성경 6-예언자를 살린 까마귀》, 비룡소, 1996 / Ko Jinha, illustration by Kim Solomon, Eorini seonggyeong 6 – yeeonjareul sallin kkamagwi (Children's Bible 6 – Ravens That Saved the Prophet), BIR, 1996.

고진하 글, 김솔로몬 그림, 《어린이성경 7-고래 뱃속의 요나》, 비룡소, 1996 / Ko Jinha, illustration by Kim Solomon, Eorini seonggyeong 7 – gorae baetsogui yona (Children's Bible 7 – Jonah in the Belly of a Whale), BIR, 1996.

《살아있는 이야기 성경-구약 1》, 아가페출판사, 2002 / Sarainneun iyagi seonggyeong – guyak 1 (A Vivid Bible Story – Old Testament 1), Agape, 2002.

《살아있는 이야기 성경-구약 2》, 아가페출판사, 2003 / Sarainneun iyagi seonggyeong – guyak 2(A Vivid Bible Story – Old Testament 2), Agape, 2003.

《살아있는 이야기 성경-구약 3》, 아가페출판사, 2003 / Sarainneun iyagi seonggyeong – guyak 3 (A Vivid Bible Story – Old Testament 3), Agape, 2003.

《살아있는 이야기 성경-신약》, 아가페출판사, 2002 / Sarainneun iyagi seonggyeong – sinyak 1 (A Vivid Bible Story – New Testament), Agape, 2002.

고진하 글, 최은정 그림, 《기적의 왕, 꼬마 예수》, 큰나, 2008 / Ko Jinha, illustration by Choi Eun-jeong, Gijeogui wang, kkoma yesu (Child Jesus, the King of Miracles), Keunna, 2008.

고진하 글, 이수진 그림, 《한국고전문학읽기 2-춘향전》, 주니어김영사, 2012 / Ko Jinha, illustration by Lee Su-jin, Hanguk gojeonmunhak ikgi 2 – Chunhyangjeon (Reading Classic Korean Literature – The Story of Chunhyang), Junior Gimmyong, 2012.

일연·고진하 글, 이선주 그림, 《한국고전문학읽기 24-삼국유사》, 주니어김영사, 2013 / Il-yeon and Ko Jinha, illustration by Lee Seon-ju, Hanguk gojeonmunhak ikgi 24 – Samgukyusa (Reading Classic Korean Literature 24 – Memorabilia of the Three Kingdoms), Junior Gimmyong, 2013.

혜초·고진하 글, 김병하 그림, 《한국고전문학읽기 31-왕오천축국전》, 주니어김영사, 2014 / Hyecho and Ko Jinha, illustration by Kim Byeong-ha, Hanguk gojeonmunhak ikgi 31 – Wangocheonchukgukjeon (Reading Classic Korean Literature 31 – Memoir of the Pilgrimage to the Five Regions of India), Junior Gimmyong, 2014.

김부식·고진하 글, 송향란 그림, 《한국고전문학읽기 32-삼국사기》, 주니어김영사, 2014 / Kim Pusik and Ko Jinha, illustration by Song Hyang-ran, Hanguk gojeonmunhak ikgi 32 – Samguk sagi (Reading Classic Korean Literature 32 – History of the Three Kingdoms), Junior Gimmyong, 2014.

=== 6. Essay collections ===
《빈들을 가득 채우고 있는 당신》, 나눔사, 1994 / Bindeureul gadeuk chaeugo inneun dangsin (Empty Fields Full of You), Nanumsa, 1994.

《영혼을 살아 있게 하는 50가지 방법》, 현대문학, 1997 / Yeonghoneul sara itge haneun 50gaji bangbeop (50 Ways to Keep Your Soul Alive), Hyundae Munhak, 1997.

《풍경이 있는 설교》, 진흥, 2000 / Punggyeongi inneun seolgyo (Sermons in Landscape), Jinheung, 2000.

《나무 신부님과 누에성자》, 세계사, 2001 / Namu sinbunimgwa nue seongja (Father Tree and Saint Silkworm), Segyesa, 2001.

《부드러움의 힘》, 생각의나무, 2001 / Budeureoumui him (The Power of Gentleness), Saenggakui Namu, 2001.

《내 영혼의 웰빙》, 진흥, 2004 / Nae yeonghonui welbing (The Well-Being of My Soul), Jinheung, 2004.

《1분의 지혜》, 꿈꾸는돌, 2004 / 1bunui jihye (One Minute Wisdom), Kkumkkuneundol, 2004.

《이 아침 한줌 보석을 너에게 주고 싶구나》, 큰나무, 2004 / I achim hanjum boseogeul neoege jugo sipguna (This Morning I Want to Give You This Fistful of Gems), Keunnamu, 2004.

《목사 고진하의 몸 이야기》, 도솔, 2005 / Moksa Ko Jinhaui mom iyagi (The Story of the Body by Pastor Ko Jinha), Dosol, 2005.

《신을 벗고 걷다》, 나눔의집, 2005 / Sineul beotgo geotda (Walking Barefoot), Nanumuijip, 2005.

《나무명상》, KMC, 2007 / Namumyeongsang (Tree Meditation), KMC, 2007.

《아주 특별한 1분》, 조화로운삶, 2009 / Aju teukbyeolhan 1bun (One Very Special Minute), Johwarounsam, 2009.

《신들의 나라, 인간의 땅》, 비채, 2009 / Sindeurui nara, ingenui ttang (The Country of Gods, The Land of People), Bichae, 2009.

《영혼의 정원사》, 뿔, 2009 / Yeonghonui jeongwonsa (Gardener of Soul), Ppul, 2009.

《누가 우편함에 새를 배달했을까》, KMC, 2012 / Nuga upyeonhame saereul baedalhaesseulkka (Who Delivered a Bird to My Mailbox), KMC, 2012.

《오늘, 행복하여라》, 푸른영토, 2013 / Oneul, haengbokhayeora (Be Happy Today), Blue Territory, 2013.

《성서 속 기도의 스승에게 배우다》, 꽃자리, 2013 / Seongseo sok gidoui seuseungege baeuda (Learning from the Teacher of Prayers in the Bible), Kkotjari, 2013.

《쿵쿵》, 넥서스CROSS, 2014 / Kkungkkung (Thump Thump), NexusCROSS, 2014.

《시 읽어주는 예수》, 비채, 2015 / Si ilgeojuneun yesu (Jesus Reading Poetry), Bichae, 2015.

《책은 돛》, 동녘, 2015 / Chaegeun dot (A Book Is a Sail), Dongnyok, 2015.

《조금 불편하지만 제법 행복합니다》, 마음의숲, 2018 / Jogeum bulpyeonhajiman jebeop haengbokhamnida (It's a Bit Inconvenient, But I'm Happy), Maumuisup, 2018.

=== 7. Translations ===
Theodor Ziolkowski, Fictional Transfiguration of Jesus, Princeton University Press, 1972 / 《성자에서 민중으로》, 고진하 역, 세계사, 1990.

Ruth Krauss, illustration by Marc Simont, The Happy Day, HarperCollins, 1989 / 《코를 "킁킁"》, 고진하 역, 비룡소, 1997.

Ruth Krauss, illustration by Marc Simont, The Happy Day, HarperCollins, 1989 / 《모두 행복한 날》, 고진하 역, 시공주니어, 2017.

Mike Maddox, illustration by Jeff Anderson The Graphic Bible, Broadman & Holman, 1998 / 《그래픽 바이블》, 고진하 역, 문학동네, 1999.

Dyan Sheldon, illustration by Gary Blythe, The Whales' Song, Red Fox, 1993 / 《고래들의 노래》, 고진하 역, 비룡소, 2000.

Angela Abraham and Ken Abraham, illustration by Terry Anderson and Kathleen Dunne, Jusus Loves Me Bible, Tommy Nelson, 1999 / 《토미 넬슨 어린이 성경》, 고진하 역, 성서원, 2001.

Yolanda Browne, illustration by Kathy Couri, Daytime Prayers, Authentic Lifestyle, 2001 / 《낮에 기도해요》, 고진하 역, 성서원, 2001.

Swami Veda Bharati, Sayings - Saying Nothing Says It All / 《1분의 명상여행》, 고진하 역, 꿈꾸는돌, 2004.

Yolanda Browne, illustration by Kathy Couri, Sleepytime Prayers, Corcordia Publishing House, 2000 / 《밤에 기도해요》, 고진하 역, 성서원, 2005.

Susie Arnett, photography by Doug Kim, Born Yogis, Rodale Books, 2005 /《아기는 요가 중》, 고진하 역, 바다출판사, 2006.

John Piper, The Prodigal's Sister, Crossway, 2003 / 《탕자의 여동생》, 고진하 역, 생명의말씀사, 2010.

Steven C. Hayes, Mindfulness and Acceptance, Guilford Press, 2004 / 《알아차림과 수용》, 고진하 역, 명상상담연구원, 2010.

Thomas Roberts, The Mindfulness Workbook, New Harbinger Publications, 2009 / 《알아차림 명상 워크북》, 고진하 역, 명상상담연구원, 2011.

Elena Pasquali, illustration by Sophie Windham, The Three Trees: A Traditional Folktale, Lion Hudson, 2011 / 《세 나무 이야기》, 고진하 역, 포이에마, 2012.

Lisa M. Schab, Beyond the Blues: A Workbook to Help Teens Overcome Depression, Instant Help Books, 2008 / 《우울을 넘어서》, 고진하·인경스님 공역, 명상상담연구원, 2012.

=== 8. Compilation ===
《90년대 기독교 시인들》, 미래문화사, 1996 / 90nyeondae gidokgyo siindeul (Christian Poets in the 1990s), Mirae Munhwasa, 1996.

== Awards ==
Kim Daljin Literary Prize (for "Jeumeu maeul 1" (Jeumeu Village) and five other poems) (1997)

Gangwon Writers' Award (강원작가상) (2003)

Yeongnang Poetry Award (for Myeongnangui dulle) (2016)
