= Homer Hulbert =

American missionary in Korea (1863–1949)

Homer B. Hulbert
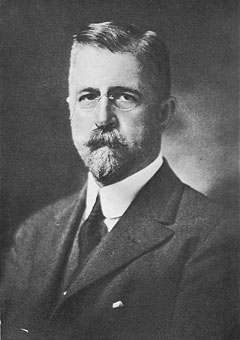
- Born: January 26, 1863; New Haven, Vermont, U.S.
- Died: August 5, 1949 (aged 86); Seoul, South Korea
- Education: Dartmouth College, Union Theological Seminary
- Occupations: Educator, missionary, journalist, linguist, historian
- Known for: Research on Hangeul and Korean independence activism

Homer Bezaleel Hulbert (January 26, 1863 – August 5, 1949) was an American educator, missionary, historian, journalist, linguist, and Korean independence activist. Although a U.S. citizen, much of his professional life and scholarly work was devoted to Korea, where he became closely involved in education, language reform, historical scholarship, and diplomatic advocacy during the late nineteenth and early twentieth centuries.

Hulbert played an active role in Korea’s early modern educational reforms, teaching at several of the country’s first modern institutions and promoting education as central to Korea’s future. He also contributed to the early development of Korean studies through his research on the Korean language, history, and culture. He authored Saminpilji (1891), Korea’s first modern-style textbook written in Hangeul, as well as major English-language works on Korean history, including The History of Korea (1905) and The Passing of Korea (1906).

Hulbert twice served as a special envoy of the Korean emperor, traveling to the United States in 1905 and to the 1907 Peace Conference in The Hague to represent Korea’s sovereignty. After his participation in the Hague mission, he was unable to return to Korea and instead settled in Springfield, Massachusetts, from where he continued to advocate for Korea until its liberation in 1945.

== Early life and education ==
=== Family background ===
Hulbert was born in New Haven, Vermont, in 1863 to Calvin and Mary Hulbert. His father, Calvin B. Hulbert, was a congregational church minister and served as president of Middlebury College from 1875 to 1879. His mother, Mary Elizabeth Woodward Hulbert, was the great-granddaughter of Eleazar Wheelock, the founder of Dartmouth College.

=== Childhood ===
From an early age, Hulbert displayed a strong sense of curiosity, along with a deep appreciation for nature. He was also an avid reader. His sister Mary later recalled that their father’s extensive library functioned as a “playground” for him. He completed high school in Middlebury in 1879 and spent a year studying at St. Johnsbury Academy.

=== Higher education ===
In 1880, Hulbert matriculated at Dartmouth College, where he was an active participant in campus life. He served as president of the music club, sang in the college choir, and played varsity football. He was also a member of the Tri-Kappa fraternity, which at the time functioned as a literary and debate society. Following his graduation in 1884, Hulbert enrolled at Union Theological Seminary in New York City.

== Arrival in Joseon and early educational work (1886–1891) ==
In 1884, Hulbert’s father, who had been consulted by U.S. Commissioner of Education John Eaton, was asked to recommend one of his sons to serve as a teacher in the first Western-style modern school in Joseon. Homer readily accepted this proposal. However, Joseon’s plans were abruptly suspended following the outbreak of the Gapsin Coup in December 1884. During the delay, Hulbert continued his studies at Union Theological Seminary while independently pursuing knowledge of East Asia. He later wrote in his memoir that from this period onward, Korea became “the absorbing topic” of his life.

In the winter of 1885, Hulbert received confirmation that Joseon intended to revive its educational initiative. Eaton summoned Hulbert, along with George W. Gilmore and Dalzell A. Bunker, to Washington, D.C., where they were briefed on their teaching responsibilities. On May 21, 1886, the three teachers departed from San Francisco, bound for Yokohama. Hulbert spent several weeks in Japan, where he observed what he described as a high level of modernization. On July 2, he boarded the Tsuruga Maru, crossing the Korea Strait and arriving at Jemulpo (present-day Incheon).

=== Working at Yukyeong-gongwon (육영공원; Royal College) ===
On September 23, 1886, the Joseon court formally established Yukyeong-gongwon (육영공원; Royal College), the first state-run modern school. The school’s initial curriculum emphasized English reading, writing, and spelling, later expanding to include grammar, geography, and mathematics. In correspondence dated September 24, 1886, Hulbert described his early classroom experiences, noting that he made an immediate impression by calling students by their Korean names on the first day of instruction.

The inaugural cohort consisted of thirty-five students, many of whom were officials who had passed the gwageo (과거; civil service exams), lending the school considerable prestige. Hulbert credited King Gojong with a strong commitment to the institution, noting that the King insisted it operate entirely according to American educational standards and made the court cover all student expenses. In an 1889 article for the New York Tribune, Hulbert described the King’s unprecedented practice of personally conducting annual student examinations at the palace, a gesture Hulbert viewed as emblematic of royal support for educational reform.

As a teacher, he emphasized building personal relationships with students, frequently inviting them to his residence, introducing them to foreign items, such as typewriters and violins, and organizing picnics near Dongdaemun (동대문; East Gate).

Despite its daily success, the school encountered certain obstacles. In late 1886, court officials ordered a reduction in instructional hours. Hulbert submitted a petition objecting to the decision, arguing that it would undermine academic outcomes. When he discovered that the petition had been intercepted, he sought assistance from George C. Foulk, acting minister of the U.S. legation. Foulk brought the matter directly to King Gojong, who reversed the order.

=== Studying the language and culture ===
Hulbert approached Korean language acquisition with determination. Upon arriving in Seoul, he resolved to achieve fluency within a month and hired a tutor who spoke no English, relying entirely on gesture-based instruction. By December 1886, he was intermittently teaching students in Korean. Beyond language study, Hulbert immersed himself in Joseon culture. He collected folk tales, traditional games, and legends. He frequently visited palaces and recorded detailed observations of court examinations, street life, and material culture. By 1890, Hulbert was also an active participant in Seoul’s foreign intellectual community.

==== Writing "The Korean Language" ====
Hulbert quickly recognized the accessibility and pedagogical value of Hangeul. Within four days of arriving in Joseon, he had learned to read and write the script, and within a week he became acutely aware that Hangeul remained marginalized in elite society. Hulbert emerged as a vocal advocate for the expanded use of Hangeul, arguing that it was essential for broadening education, advancing social development, and undermining the rigid class hierarchy that privileged Classical Chinese literacy.

In 1889, Hulbert published an article titled “The Korean Language” in the New-York Tribune. The article constituted one of the earliest systematic introductions of the Korean language and its writing system to a Western readership and is regarded as the first scholarly discussion of Hangeul in an international newspaper. The article examined the structural features of the Korean alphabet, emphasizing its phonetic organization and internal consistency. Hulbert described the vowel system and explained how sounds were represented in writing, presenting Korean as a language governed by coherent linguistic principles. He contrasted the regularity of Korean spelling with the irregularities of English orthography to illustrate the relative ease of learning the Korean script.

=== Marriage ===
In the summer of 1888, Hulbert returned briefly to the United States to marry Mary Belle Hanna, whom he had met through the Sunday School choir at Union Theological Seminary. Hanna, a graduate of Teachers College in New York City, was a trained educator. The couple married on September 18, 1888, and soon returned to Joseon, where Mary Hulbert adapted quickly to life in Seoul.

=== Departing from Joseon ===
Hulbert departed Joseon in December 1891 following unsuccessful contract renewal negotiations with both the Joseon court and the U.S. legation. In correspondence with his parents, he expressed dissatisfaction with revised terms that included a salary freeze and relocation to inferior housing. He subsequently returned to the United States, settling in Ohio, where he served as principal of Putnam Military Academy.

== Saminpilji (사민필지) ==
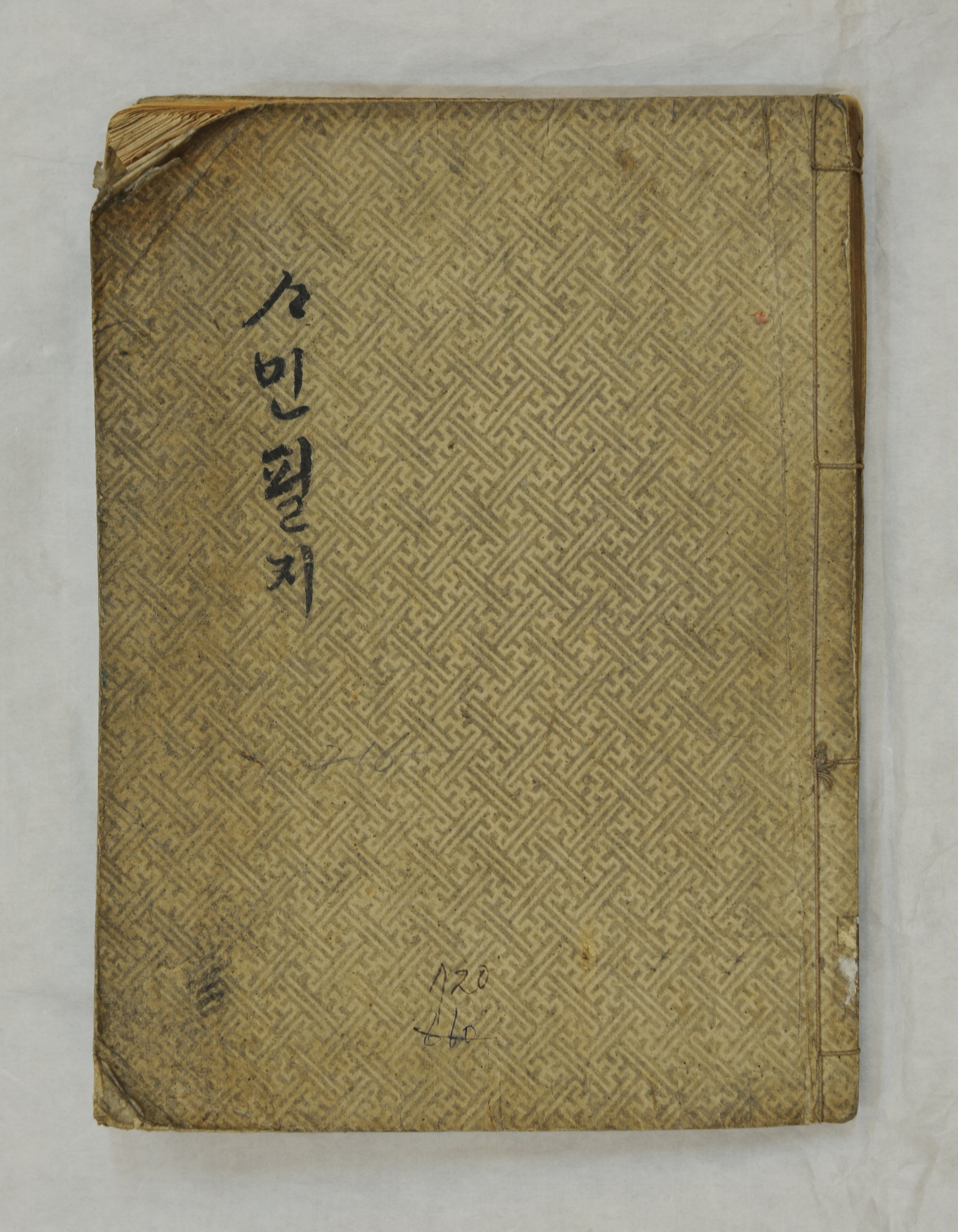
An early edition cover of Saminpilji. The book title is handwritten. Courtesy of the Appenzeller/Noble Memorial Museum (배재학당역사박물관)

One of Hulbert’s most consequential contributions to the promotion of Hangeul was the publication of Saminpilji in 1891. A 170-page world gazetteer, Saminpilji was the first textbook written entirely in Hangeul. Its title, translated to Knowledge Necessary for All, reflected Hulbert’s conviction that people of all social classes in Joseon should have access to foundational global knowledge comparable to that taught in the West. The book was groundbreaking not only for its use of Hangeul but also for its scope. Moving beyond conventional geography texts, Saminpilji addressed astronomy, political systems, social organization, customs, industry, state revenue, education, religion, and military power for each country discussed.

Hulbert began preparing the manuscript in early 1889 and spent nearly a year drafting it. In correspondence with his family, he emphasized his commitment to factual accuracy, noting that he had “smoothed over no national defect” and written strictly according to observed realities. He personally financed the project, spending approximately three hundred dollars to print an estimated 2,000 copies. The completed book consisted of 161 pages of text and included nine maps, six of which were hand-colored to indicate capitals, rivers, and mountain ranges. This represented a landmark achievement in Korean geographical publishing and the first major cartographic work to appear in roughly thirty years following the creation of Daedongyeojido.

=== Content ===
In the preface, Hulbert emphasized the increasing interconnectedness of the modern world and the necessity of understanding foreign nations in order to engage with them effectively. He further asked the readers to overlook stylistic imperfections and focus instead on the substance of the ideas presented, an acknowledgment of his position as a foreigner addressing Korean audiences.

Within the text, Hulbert categorized nations into four tiers based on the perceived effectiveness of their political systems. The United States and Britain occupied the highest tier, followed by Russia and Japan, while Joseon and China were placed in a lower tier. Joseon was characterized as a tyrannical society constrained by a rigid class system, excessive reliance on Classical Chinese, and limited religious freedom. At the same time, Hulbert asserted a distinctly Joseon-centered territorial claim by identifying Tsushima Island as historically belonging to Korea. Hulbert further localized the work by employing Joseon units of measurement—li (distance), cheok (height), seok (weight), and won (currency)—demonstrating his effort to make global knowledge intelligible within local frameworks.

=== Reception ===
Saminpilji encountered resistance from the yangban elite, who opposed both its use of Hangeul and its egalitarian educational implications. This resistance prompted the publication of a version translated into Classical Chinese in 1895 for official circulation among court officials.

== Return to Joseon as a Methodist missionary (1893–1897) ==
Hulbert was a strong proponent of Protestant missionary work in Joseon. He held an optimistic view of Korean society, arguing that Koreans possessed a rational and intellectual disposition that made them particularly receptive to Christianity.

In October 1893, Hulbert returned to Joseon as a Methodist missionary at the invitation of Henry G. Appenzeller. Hulbert’s missionary work encompassed three principal roles: overseeing Trilingual Press (삼문출판사), teaching at Paichai Hakdang (배재학당), and serving as pastor at Baldwin Chapel (동대문교회).

=== Trilingual Press (삼문출판사) ===
Trilingual Press (삼문출판사) was the Methodist Church mission press that published in Korean, Chinese, and English. As director of Trilingual Press, Hulbert imported a modern printing press from Cincinnati and rapidly transformed the operation into one of the most productive publishing institutions in Korea. Between October 1893 and August 1894, the press produced more than two million pages of religious tracts, pamphlets, and instructional materials. It also published influential periodicals and texts, including The Independent, The Korean Repository, and The Pilgrim’s Progress (천로역정). Moreover, it undertook public service work, notably printing 50,000 cholera-prevention posters for the Joseon court.

==== Writing for The Korean Repository ====
The Korean Repository, the first monthly magazine in Joseon, was founded by the Methodist Church in 1892. From 1895 onwards, Appenzeller, George H. Jones, and Hulbert served as co-editors, with Hulbert also taking on the role of business manager. The magazine achieved significant success, expanding its circulation to Japan, China, Europe, and America, with issues reaching over 3,000 copies in 1896. Hulbert contributed twenty-nine articles to The Korean Repository.

==== Supporting the publication of The Independent (독립신문) ====
Philip Jaisohn (서재필) sought Hulbert’s assistance in launching a newspaper written in vernacular Korean, a proposal Hulbert embraced enthusiastically. On April 7, 1896, The Independent was launched in parallel Korean (Hangeul) and English editions, with financial backing from King Gojong. It was the first newspaper published in Hangeul.

Operating through his Trilingual Press, Hulbert provided extensive logistical and technical support for the paper’s establishment, including securing printing equipment, materials, workmen, and office infrastructure. While the Korean-language edition was produced by Jaisohn, the English-language edition was produced separately, with Hulbert overseeing its publication.

=== Queen Min’s assassination and standing guard for King Gojong ===
Following the assassination of Queen Min by Japanese agents inside Gyeongbokgung on October 8, 1895, the U.S. legation appointed Hulbert and several fellow missionaries to guard the king, maintaining a continuous watch at his bedside. According to Hulbert’s account, the king consumed only food prepared by American missionaries and delivered in sealed containers to prevent poisoning.

Hulbert later documented the Chunsaengmun Incident, which occurred approximately six weeks after the assassination. On November 27, 1895, Horace G. Underwood urgently summoned Hulbert to the palace amid fears that pro-Japanese ministers posed an immediate threat to King Gojong. Hulbert, Underwood, and Oliver R. Avison entered the palace after dark, facing armed resistance from palace guards before securing access.

According to Hulbert’s account, they found King Gojong and the crown prince in a state of visible distress. As tensions intensified, pro-Japanese ministers attempted to relocate the king, claiming the move would protect him from nationalist demonstrators. Hulbert objected, arguing that such an action could invite further violence. When the ministers questioned the authority of the foreign missionaries, Hulbert replied that they were present at the king’s request and asked whether the ministers themselves had been formally summoned. Receiving no response, the ministers withdrew, and Hulbert and his companions remained on guard throughout the night.

Two years later, Hulbert attended Queen Min’s two-day funeral at the personal invitation of Emperor Gojong. He later published his observations in an article titled “The Burial of an Oriental Empress,” which appeared in the San Francisco Chronicle on January 9, 1898.

=== The first Western notation of "Arirang" ===
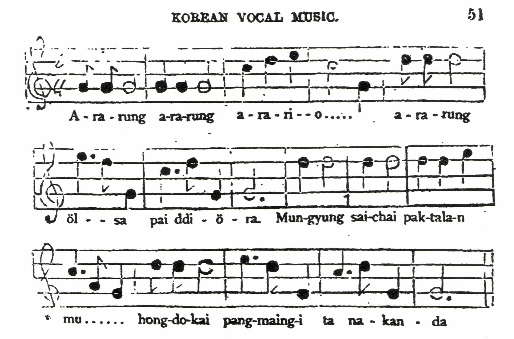
Musical Score of "Arirang," compiled by Hulbert in 1896.

In February 1896, Hulbert published the article “Korean Vocal Music” in The Korean Repository. Spanning nine pages, the study offered one of the earliest systematic analyses of Korean vocal traditions by a Western scholar and affirmed the musical sophistication of the Korean people. Most notably, Hulbert introduced "Arirang" to Western audiences with both musical notation and lyrics—the first known instance of the song being transcribed in Western notation. He further classified Korean songs by genre and included several widely sung pieces, complete with scores and texts.

== Working for the government (1897–1907) ==
=== Serving as head of the Hanseong Normal School (한성사범학교) ===
In the winter of 1896, Hulbert was invited by Philip Jaisohn to take charge of normal education in Joseon. In May 1897, Hulbert was appointed head of Hanseong Normal School under a five-year contract with a monthly salary of 225 dollars in silver. The contract granted him broad authority over the institution under the supervision of the Minister of Education, and he was simultaneously appointed as an adviser to the Ministry of Education. The Independent reported in June 1897 that Hulbert was considered uniquely qualified to redirect the school due to his fluency in Korean, particularly as the institution had previously been run by a Japanese teacher and focused primarily on arithmetic and Chinese classics.

=== Producing the Hulbert textbook series ===
Textbook production in Hangeul became one of Hulbert’s central goals as an educator. In a March 4, 1900, letter to his parents, he described meeting a newly appointed minister of education to request backing for vernacular textbook publication. By August 1900, he had drafted mathematics textbooks and submitted them to the ministry.

The precise publication history of this textbook series remains unclear. In a July 1907 interview with the New York Herald, Hulbert stated that he had recently invested $15,000 in a comprehensive set of Korean textbooks. Of the fifteen titles reportedly published, thirteen have been identified. Many were written by American missionaries and their spouses. Two works associated directly with Hulbert include (1) a 1906 adaptation of Saminpilji and (2) History of Korea (대한력사), a Hangeul partial translation of his English-language The History of Korea.

=== The Korea Review ===
Hulbert found the need for a new English publication after The Korean Repository and The Independent discontinued their publications. In January 1901, Hulbert launched The Korea Review, a monthly English-language magazine. As editor-in-chief, he personally oversaw all editorial and operational aspects of the publication. Over its six-year run, concluding in 1906, Hulbert managed the magazine while also teaching at Gwanrip Middle School. Initially, The Korea Review focused on introducing Korean history and culture, but it also covered domestic news. However, as Japan’s colonization efforts became increasingly evident, the magazine adopted a resolute stance against Japanese injustices.

The Review gained widespread acclaim. Subscriptions spread to 19 countries across five continents, including Japan, England, America, Russia, China, and Germany, with exclusive distribution agencies established in New York and London. Most of the articles in the Review were authored by Hulbert himself. His total output, including editorials, numbered 195.

=== Proclaiming the founding of the Korean YMCA ===
Hulbert played a central role in the establishment of the Korean YMCA. He was appointed chairman of the YMCA Foundation Advisory Committee in Seoul and, in 1902, became director of the YMCA’s Asia region. In articles published in The Korea Review, Hulbert articulated a vision of the YMCA as an institution dedicated to the country's advancement through the education and enlightenment of young men.

While some missionaries favored restricting the YMCA’s mission to evangelization, Hulbert argued for a broader educational mandate. He emphasized gradual, endogenous reform through enlightenment, insisting that genuine national renewal would emerge organically through education. The Korean YMCA was officially established in October 1903 and later became a significant incubator for nationalist leaders and independence activists.

=== Publishing The History of Korea (1905) ===
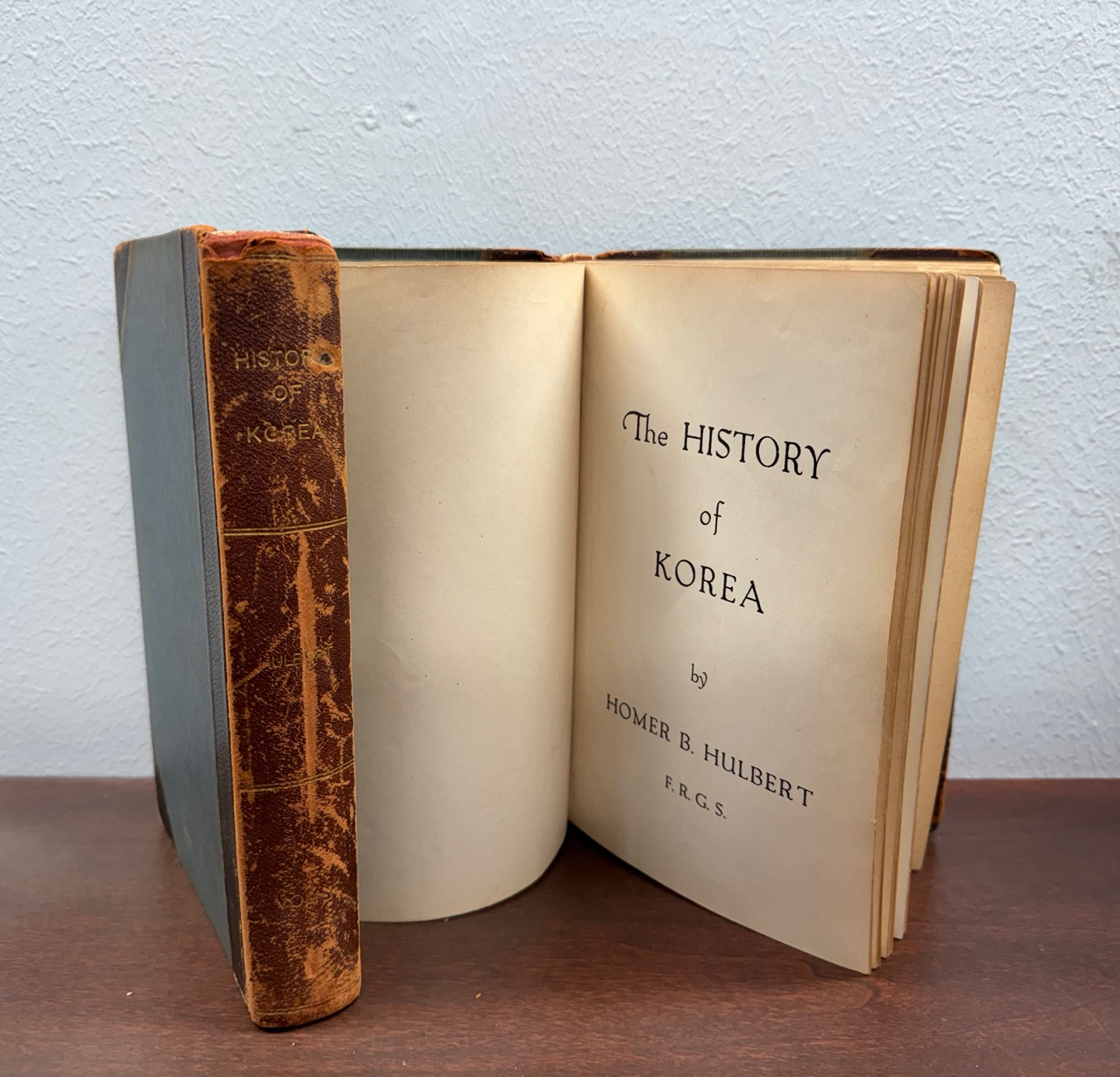
The History of Korea (two volumes).

Hulbert’s long-term historical research culminated in The History of Korea (1905), a two-volume work of more than 800 pages that traced Korean history from the Dangun era to the reign of King Gojong. The book was illustrated with twenty-five photographs of Korean relics, landscapes, and customs. In the preface, he emphasized that the work was based primarily on Korean sources and presented it as the first attempt to provide English readers a history “based on native records.” Across the work, he not only praised Korea’s defensive struggles against foreign invasions, but also repeatedly emphasized values of humane governance and social obligation, highlighting the rights for the suffering lower classes and critiquing the selfishness of the upper class.

=== Serving as special envoy to Washington (1905) ===
In the aftermath of the Russo-Japanese War, Japan’s control over Korea intensified despite Korea’s declaration of neutrality and the Korea–Japan Agreement of 1904 (한일의정서). As Korean sovereignty eroded, Emperor Gojong authorized the dispatch of an envoy in 1905 to appeal directly to U.S. President Theodore Roosevelt.

Hulbert was appointed as Emperor Gojong’s special envoy and resigned from his teaching position to undertake the mission. He secured a personal letter from the Emperor addressed to President Roosevelt, in which the Emperor warned that Japan was violating the 1904 agreement and asserted that any protectorate imposed upon Korea would be illegitimate and disastrous. Hulbert preserved the full text of this letter in “Hulbert’s Manuscripts.”

In early October 1905, Hulbert informed Edwin V. Morgan, the U.S. minister to Korea, of his trip and requested that Emperor Gojong’s letter be forwarded to Washington via the legation’s diplomatic pouch to prevent Japanese interception. Morgan agreed. However, Hulbert later wrote about how the U.S. legation leaked information about his mission to Japan. On October 19, Morgan notified Secretary of State Elihu Root of Hulbert’s arrival, casting doubt on Hulbert’s judgment and urging that his statements be independently verified.

==== The Eulsa coerced protectorate treaty ====
Hulbert departed Seoul on October 21, 1905, traveling via Busan and Yokohama to San Francisco. He suspected—and later confirmed—that Japanese agents were monitoring his movements. Meanwhile, Japan accelerated its plans. Itō Hirobumi was dispatched to Seoul as special ambassador, and on November 17, 1905, pro-Japanese ministers were coerced into signing the Eulsa Coerced Protectorate Treaty (을사늑약/乙巳勒約), which stripped Korea of diplomatic sovereignty and established the Residency-General in Seoul. Unaware of these developments, Hulbert arrived in San Francisco on November 12 and proceeded immediately to Washington, D.C.

==== Appeals in Washington ====
Upon reaching Washington on November 17, Hulbert sought assistance from his former classmate and associate Justice of the Supreme Court of the District of Columbia, Wendell P. Stafford, who helped him secure access to the White House. Hulbert attempted to deliver the letter directly to President Roosevelt but was refused without explanation. Repeated appeals to the State Department likewise failed.

Hulbert later learned that the U.S. government had received Japan’s notification—on the same day as his arrival—that the protectorate agreement was executed. Shortly thereafter, the Roosevelt administration withdrew the U.S. legation from Seoul and transferred Korean affairs to Tokyo. On November 25, Hulbert was finally permitted to meet Root, but the meeting proved futile. Root declined substantive discussion and warned that U.S. involvement would jeopardize relations with Japan.

==== Public advocacy ====
On December 11, 1905, Hulbert received a telegram from Emperor Gojong declaring the treaty null and void on the grounds that it had been concluded under duress and without imperial consent. Hulbert delivered the telegram to the State Department, where it was summarily filed without discussion. Recognizing that diplomatic channels had been exhausted, Hulbert turned to the press.

In mid-December 1905, The New York Times published multiple interviews with Hulbert detailing Emperor Gojong’s protest, the coercive circumstances surrounding the treaty, and reports of Japanese repression in Korea. Hulbert emphasized that the Emperor had been effectively confined, that the treaty had been forced at gunpoint, and that Japan had misrepresented Korean public opinion. He argued that Korea’s final hope lay in appealing directly to American public sentiment.

Hulbert returned to Korea on May 22, 1906, deeply disillusioned with American diplomacy but resolute in his commitment to Korea’s cause. In a letter to his parents written shortly before his departure from the United States, he declared that he would devote himself to “waking up the spirit of Koreans” and “fighting against all opposing forces.”

=== Publishing The Passing of Korea (1906) ===
The Passing of Korea marked Hulbert’s most direct and impassioned response to the Eulsa Coerced Protectorate Treaty and to what he viewed as the failure of the United States to honor its treaty obligations to Korea. The 473-page volume was issued simultaneously in New York by Doubleday, Page & Company and in London by William Heinemann, signaling Hulbert’s intention to reach a broad transatlantic readership.

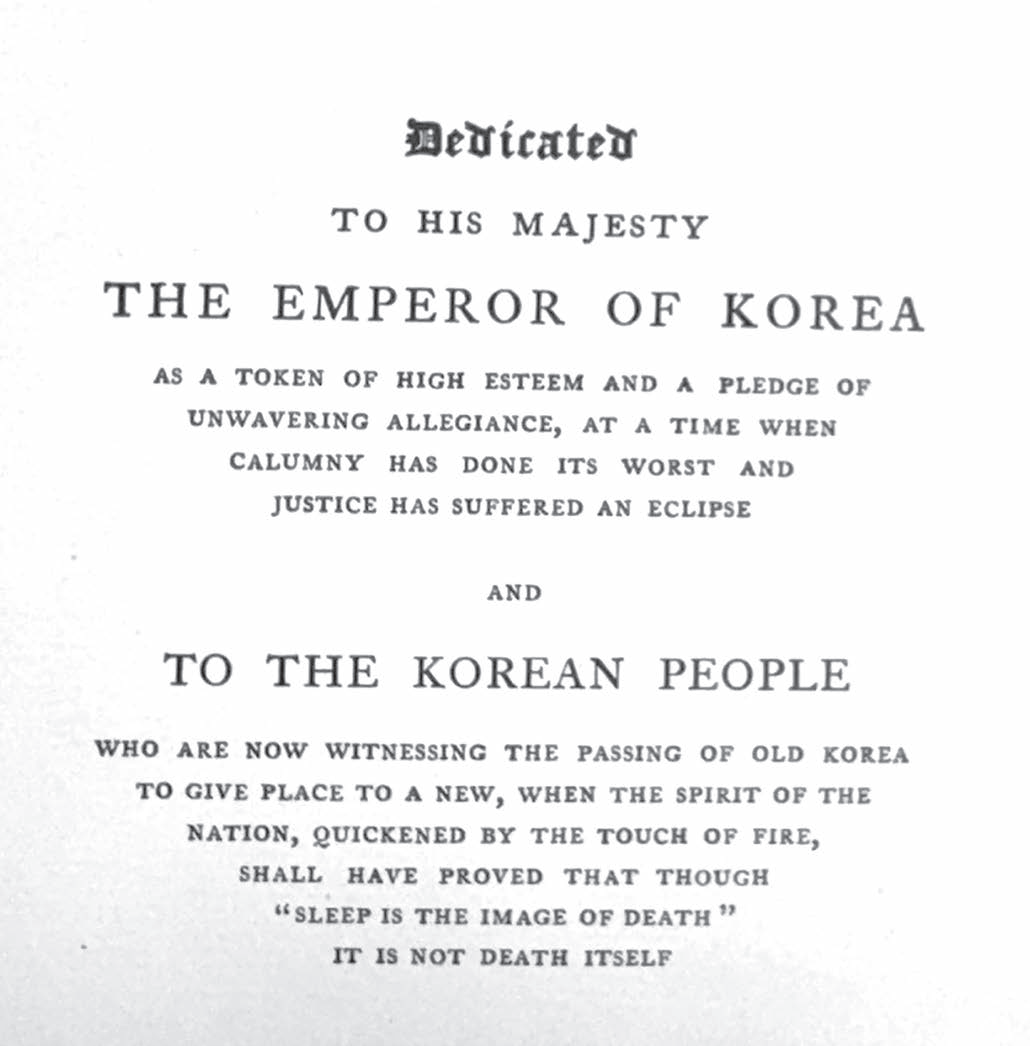
Hulbert's tribute to Emperor Gojong and the Korean people in The Passing of Korea (1906).

The book offered a comprehensive portrait of Korea, addressing its language, history, social structure, industry, arts, customs, and everyday life. It was illustrated with sixty-three photographs depicting historic landmarks—such as Gwanghwamun—as well as scenes of everyday living conditions. In providing a comprehensive portrait, Hulbert sought to draw international attention to a people who had been “frequently maligned and seldom appreciated.”

Hulbert praised Koreans for their intellectual capacity, hospitality, and adaptability, while also offering a candid critique of internal weaknesses. He identified strong conservatism, corruption, factionalism, and elite self-interest as central contributors to Korea’s vulnerability. At the same time, he condemned Japan’s imperial ambitions and sharply criticized the Roosevelt administration for its pro-Japanese stance, singling out the United States as the first of Korea’s treaty partners to withdraw its legation from Seoul and relocate Korean affairs to Tokyo. In the concluding chapter, “The Future of Korea,” Hulbert argued that the United States bore a moral responsibility to support Korea, asserting that few nations had treated American citizens with comparable goodwill.

The book attracted significant attention in the Western press. Reviews in outlets such as The New York Times and The London Tribune praised Hulbert’s account as credible, affirming the accuracy of his narrative.

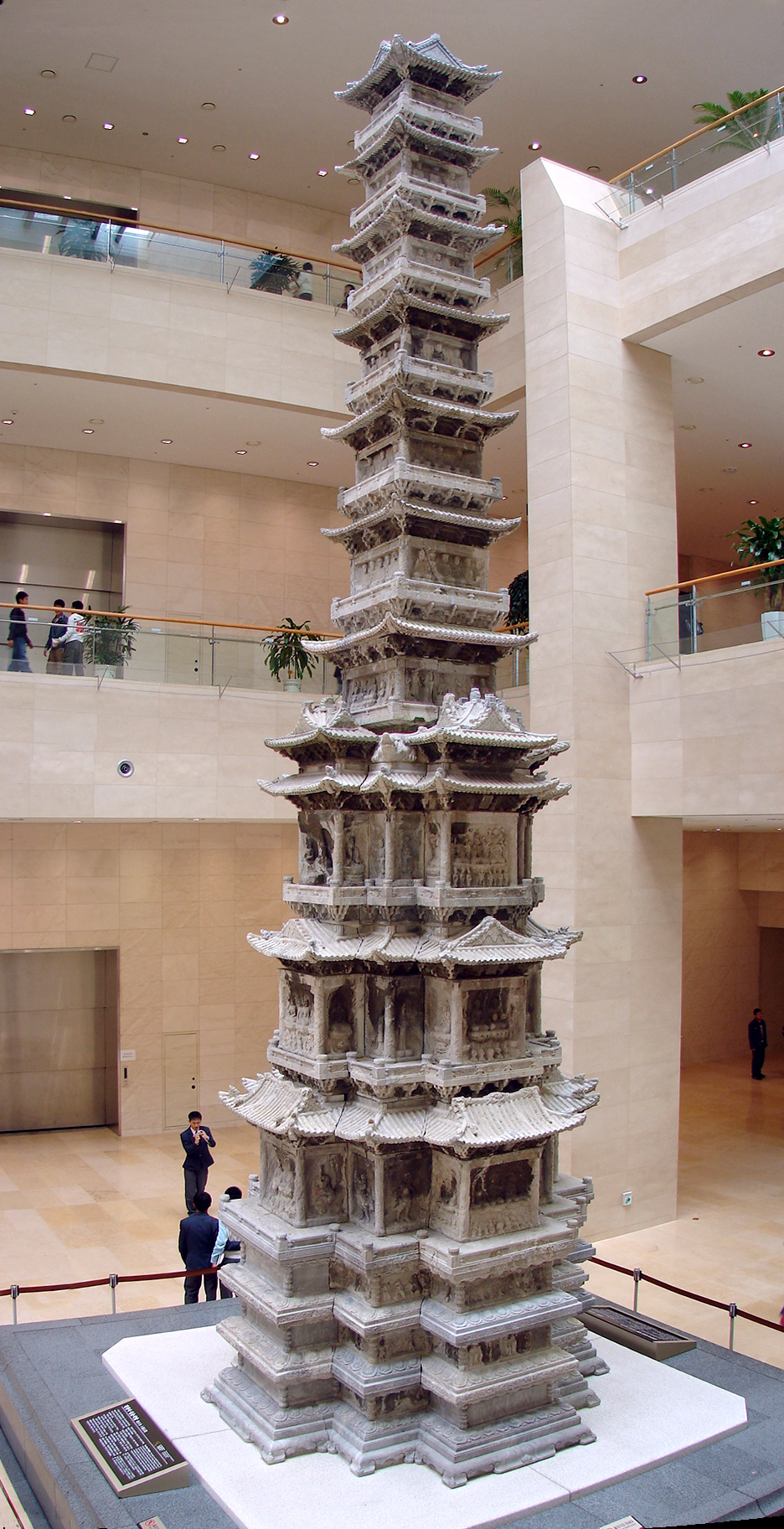
The returned Gyeongcheonsa Pagoda now sits on the first floor of the National Museum of Korea.

=== Protesting for the return of stolen pagoda ===
In 1907, Hulbert played a central role in publicizing and protesting the removal of the Gyeongcheonsa ten-story stone pagoda, a Goryeo-period monument originally erected in 1348 at Gyeongcheonsa Temple. After Japanese official Tanaka Mitsuaki arranged for the pagoda’s dismantling and transport to Japan despite Emperor Gojong’s refusal, Hulbert traveled to the site to investigate the incident.

In March 1907, Hulbert documented the remains of the dismantled pagoda, collected eyewitness testimony from local residents, and photographed physical evidence at the site. He published his findings in The Japan Chronicle under the title “Vandalism in Korea,” comparing the removal to the theft of major European monuments and arguing that the act reflected abuses made possible by Japan’s protectorate over Korea. Hulbert called on the Japanese government to compel the pagoda’s return.

Hulbert later raised the issue in international forums, including during the Second International Peace Conference at The Hague in 1907, contributing to broader international awareness of cultural property removal in Korea. Following sustained international criticism, the pagoda was returned to Korea in 1918.

=== Special envoy of the emperor to the Second International Peace Conference at The Hague (1907) ===
The Second International Peace Conference convened at The Hague in June 1907. The Korean court viewed it as an opportunity to contest the legitimacy of the Japanese protectorate imposed in November 1905. Korea’s diplomatic status under Japanese control, however, rendered its participation highly contentious.

Seeking to challenge the protectorate on the international stage, Emperor Gojong authorized the dispatch of special envoys to The Hague. Hulbert was appointed as the envoy responsible for approaching Korea’s treaty partners and securing their support for raising the Korean question at the conference. By June 1906, Hulbert had obtained imperial credentials and personal letters addressed to foreign heads of state, granting him full authority to represent Korea’s interests abroad. In parallel, the Emperor designated three Korean envoys—Yi Sangseol, Yi Jun, and Yi Wijong—to attend the conference directly.

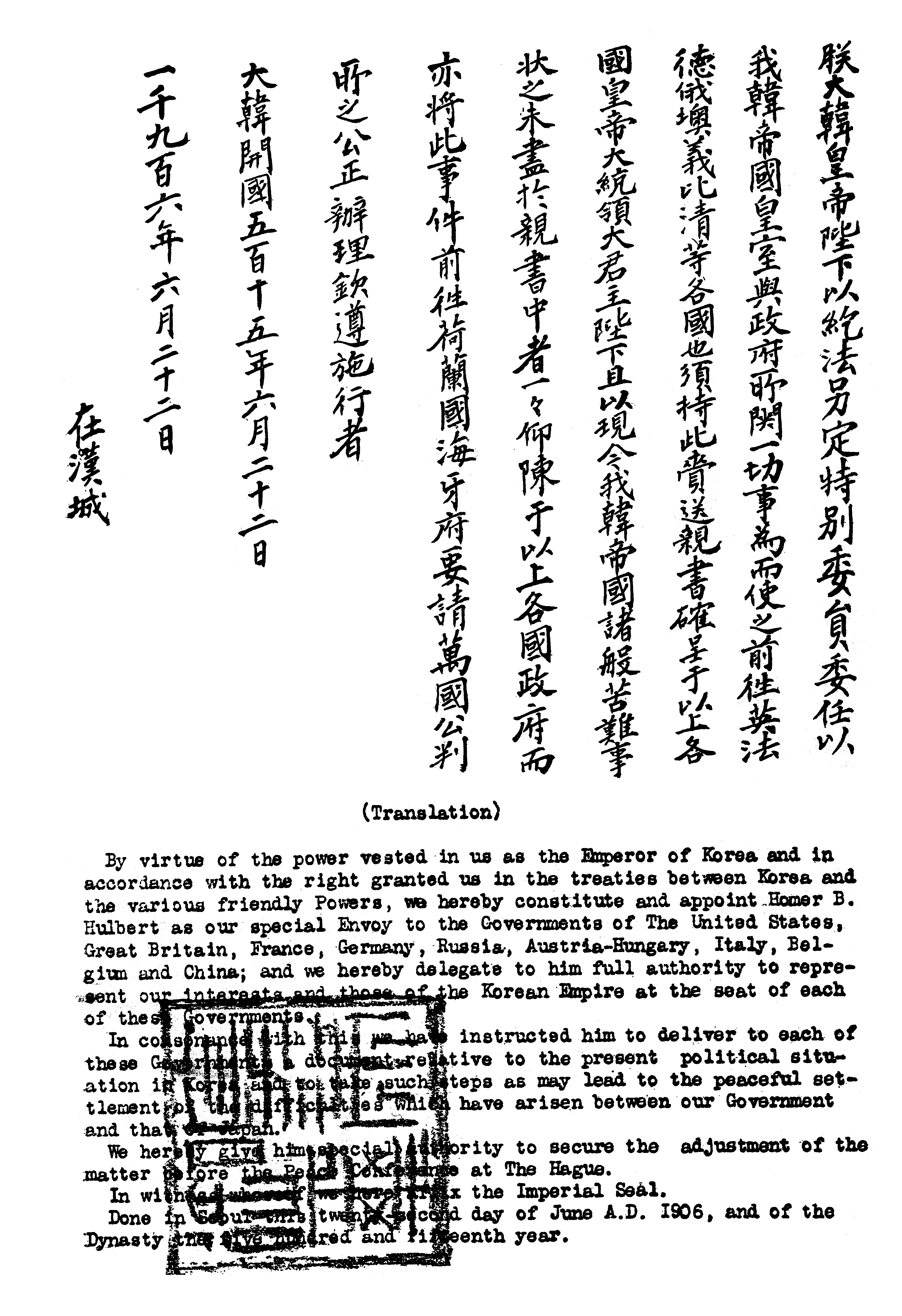
Emperor Gojong's credential for Hulbert for the 1907 Hague Peace Conference. This was first discovered as a copy in a leaflet related to Hulbert's lecture at the library of Dartmouth College in 2004.

On May 8, 1907, Hulbert departed Seoul discreetly. Japanese authorities quickly identified the mission’s purpose and placed him under constant surveillance from the moment he reached Japan.

After transiting through Vladivostok and boarding the Trans-Siberian Railway, Hulbert unsuccessfully attempted to secure Russian support by requesting an audience with Foreign Minister Alexander Izvolsky. He then proceeded through Berlin and Paris, where he engaged members of the press and sought sympathetic coverage of Korea’s plight.

Hulbert arrived in The Hague on July 10, 1907, shortly after the Korean envoys had been denied official recognition by conference authorities and ignored by the Dutch government. In response, the envoys distributed a written appeal known as the Gonggosa (控告詞), which denounced the protectorate as illegitimate and imposed under coercion.

One of Hulbert’s most consequential interventions during this period was securing the cooperation of W. T. Stead, editor of the Courier de la Conférence. The Courier published the Gonggosa in French, ensuring its circulation among the international press. With Stead’s assistance, Hulbert also addressed the Peace Club, an assembly of journalists and observers, reinforcing the Korean envoys’ arguments and warning that continued oppression would provoke popular resistance in Korea.

Soon afterward, Hulbert departed for the United States to renew his efforts to influence American policy. While en route, Yi Jun died suddenly in The Hague on July 14, 1907. Around the same time, hearing about the Hague mission, Japan responded tby forcefully replacing Emperor Gojong with Sunjong, and placing Korea's internal administration under Japanese control.

Stripped of official status and barred by Japanese authorities from returning to Korea, Hulbert was forced to continue his advocacy for Korean independence from abroad.

== Fighting for Korean Independence in the United States (1907–1945) ==
After the Hague mission, Hulbert resettled in Springfield, Massachusetts. Even while living abroad, he committed himself to sustained public advocacy against Japanese rule.

=== Mobilizing public opinion through the press ===
Hulbert immediately turned to the American press to publicize Korea’s crisis. Interviews in major papers framed the protectorate as a coercive dismantling of sovereignty and urged Americans to recognize its consequences. He continued to challenge the legality of the Japan-Korea Treaty of 1905. He also asserted that the Korean people would never relinquish their sovereignty. He continued this media campaign in subsequent years.

Mrs. Hulbert also participated in this public-facing effort. In an interview with the New-York Tribune in 1910, she described everyday violence and humiliation directed at Koreans.

=== Touring Korean communities and the American public ===
Beginning in late 1907, Hulbert toured Korean communities in the United States, seeking to strengthen morale and encourage collective organization. Hulbert’s lectures were not limited to Korean audiences. He also spoke to broader American publics, frequently framing Korea’s fate as a test of international conduct and a matter with commercial consequences for the United States in Asia. He argued that annexation would result in significant losses for Americans, including vital trade opportunities in the Far East.

==== Lecturing on Korea through the Chautauqua ====
From 1911, Hulbert reached an even wider audience through the Chautauqua, one of the most prominent adult education networks in the early twentieth-century United States. His lectures—often centered on Korea’s recent history and the dynamics of empire—gave him a sustained platform for more than a decade, and he used it to keep Korea visible to Americans who otherwise knew little about the peninsula.

Hulbert continued these lecture tours well into the 1920s, speaking to various Korean independence organizations, including The League of Friends of Korea, The Korean Commission to America and Europe, and The United Korean Committee in America. Notably, on April 20, 1920, he appeared alongside Syngman Rhee at Boston University for a joint lecture on the principles of peace.

=== Brief trip to Korea in 1909 ===
In August 1909, Hulbert returned to Korea to assess conditions under Japanese rule and to address unresolved personal and professional matters left behind after his abrupt departure in 1907. Fully aware that his reappearance could invite retaliation, he drafted a will for his wife before departing Springfield. Upon arriving, Hulbert proceeded directly to the U.S. consulate to request protection.

Throughout his two-month stay, he was kept under constant Japanese surveillance. Hulbert was deeply disturbed to discover that Japanese authorities had confiscated and destroyed all copies of his Korean-language history books. His presence in Seoul became further entangled in an atmosphere of heightened tension following the assassination of Itō Hirobumi in Harbin on October 26, 1909. Rumors and press speculation surrounding the event intensified concerns for Hulbert’s safety.

==== Attempting to recover Emperor Gojong’s stolen deposit ====
During Hulbert’s 1909 visit, Hulbert was approached by Emperor Gojong's nephew, Namseung Cho, who delivered documents indicating that the Emperor had entrusted Hulbert with retrieving his personal funds deposited at the Deutsch-Asiatische Bank in Shanghai for the benefit of the nation. The papers included securities, checks, a receipt, and a power of attorney signed by the Emperor. Hulbert left to Shanghai from Seoul in early November to complete this task.

In Shanghai, Hulbert learned—through a German consul—that the deposit had already been transferred to Japan in 1908, apparently without Emperor Gojong’s knowledge. Outraged, Hulbert returned to the United States, attempting to trace the withdrawal through bankers and political intermediaries, but progress was limited.

After World War I, Hulbert renewed the effort through new agents, assembling documentation and testimonies that framed the withdrawal as illegitimate. Although he gathered evidence that the funds had been turned over to the Residency-General, Hulbert was unable to make significant progress in recovering the stolen funds. Even in his final years, Hulbert treated the recovery of the deposit as a moral obligation tied to his relationship with Emperor Gojong and his long commitment to Korea’s independence.

=== Debating Japan’s rule in American public life ===
==== Hulbert vs. Durham W. Stevens ====
Hulbert’s advocacy collided directly with Americans who defended Japan’s position in Korea. In 1907, Harper’s Weekly portrayed Hulbert and Durham W. Stevens—an American diplomat working for the Resident-General—as rival champions of opposing causes. The public “duel” cast Hulbert as an "American knight errant, who has chivalrously staked his all upon an endeavor to save Korea from Japan," and Stevens as "one of the ablest, best-equipped, and worldly-wise advisers ever employed by Mikado's government".

==== Hulbert vs. George Trumbull Ladd ====
Hulbert also clashed with Yale professor George Trumbull Ladd, whose 1908 book In Korea with Marquis Ito defended Japan’s administration and portrayed Koreans in disparaging terms. In a public exchange of letters in The New York Times, Hulbert disputed Ladd’s factual claims and questioned the basis of his authority, arguing that Japan had repeatedly violated its own assurances and that Ladd lacked meaningful access to conditions in Korea. He also pressed Ladd to state publicly whether he had received any compensation from Japanese sources. Ladd rejected the insinuation, replying that he trusted his “emphatic denial… once for all” would be satisfactory.

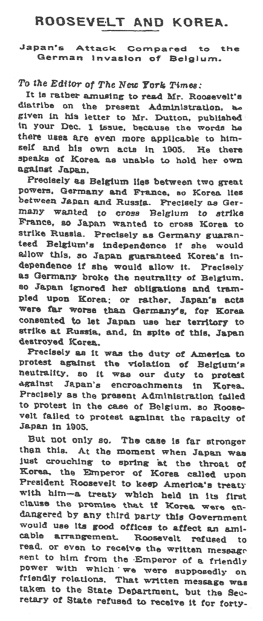
Hulbert's article titled "Roosevelt and Korea," published in The New York Times.

==== Confronting the Roosevelt administration ====
Hulbert reserved some of his most sustained criticism for the Roosevelt administration, which he believed had abandoned treaty obligations and enabled Japan’s consolidation of power. In 1915–1916, after Theodore Roosevelt condemned U.S. timidity toward German actions in Belgium, Hulbert used the parallel to argue that Roosevelt had failed even more decisively in Korea. His letters—published in The New York Times—sparked political controversy and contributed to congressional discussion of U.S.–Korea correspondence from the period of Japan’s takeover.

=== Supporting Korean independence at the Paris Peace Conference (1918–1919) ===
In late 1918 and early 1919, Hulbert sought to bring Korea’s case into the orbit of the post–World War I peace settlement. He collaborated with Korean activists in the United States who were preparing petitions and strategies for international appeal. Hulbert traveled to France in late 1918, where he joined and supported Kim Kyu-sik, the official representative of the Korean Provisional Government, for the Paris Peace Conference. Although these efforts failed to secure formal recognition, Hulbert’s involvement contributed to international awareness of Korea and its circumstances under Japanese rule.

=== Appealing to the U.S. Senate through “What About Korea?” (1919) ===
After returning to the United States from Paris in mid-1919, Hulbert concentrated his advocacy on Washington, D.C., producing a written statement titled "What About Korea?" With the assistance of Senator Selden P. Spencer of Missouri, the document was submitted to the U.S. Senate Committee on Foreign Relations and subsequently entered into the Congressional Record in August 1919.

The document framed the 1919 March First Movement as a nationwide, nonviolent expression of popular will and contended that Japan’s response constituted systematic repression and violence. Hulbert combined historical narrative, treaty-based legal arguments, and detailed accounts of abuses to argue that continued Japanese rule over Korea lacked legitimacy. He also appended supporting materials, including diplomatic correspondence related to Korea’s earlier treaty relationships with the United States.

American newspapers reported on Hulbert’s submission, helping to reintroduce the Korean question to U.S. public discourse. Although the document did not produce an immediate shift in policy, it showcased Hulbert’s sustained formal efforts to present the Korean issue within American political institutions.

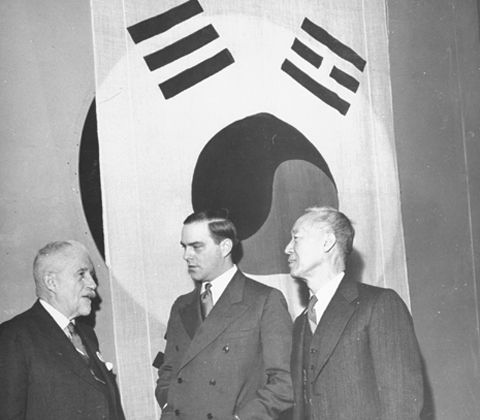
Hulbert (left) and Syngman Rhee (right) at the Korean Liberty Conference held in Washington D.C., in 1942.

=== Speaking for the Korean Liberty Conference (1942) ===
Hulbert participated as a speaker at the Korean Liberty Conference, held from February 27 to March 1, 1942, at the Lafayette Hotel in Washington, D.C., to commemorate the 23rd anniversary of the March 1st Movement. Organized by Korean American groups representing the Provisional Government of the Republic of Korea in Chongqing, the conference sought U.S. recognition of the Provisional Government. In his remarks, Hulbert argued that failure to restore Korean independence after the war would lead to future international conflict and emphasized the responsibility of the United States in “leading” Korea’s return to independence.

== Death and legacy ==
In the summer of 1949, President Syngman Rhee invited Hulbert to return to Korea as a state guest for Liberation Day on August 15. The invitation marked the culmination of Hulbert’s decades-long advocacy for Korean independence. Hulbert departed Springfield on July 4 and traveled to Washington, D.C.. His granddaughter later recalled that the family understood the journey as one from which he might not return, yet they sent him off with quiet joy, knowing how deeply he had longed for this moment. On July 8, carrying a formal state invitation, Hulbert appeared at the Korean Embassy in Washington. Asked by reporters how he felt about returning after four decades, he replied: “I would rather be buried in Korea than in Westminster Abbey.”

Hulbert arrived at Incheon to a large crowd that included government officials and hundreds of Koreans eager to welcome him. According to eyewitness accounts, a military band played as dignitaries disembarked. With assistance, Hulbert stepped onto Korean soil, murmuring “Oh—Jemulpo,” before bending down to kiss the ground. Yet the emotional intensity of the return was tempered by physical exhaustion. The long voyage had severely weakened him, and he was admitted the following day to a missionary hospital. In the days that followed, President Rhee, senior officials, former students, and longtime associates came to see him.

Hulbert died on August 5, 1949.

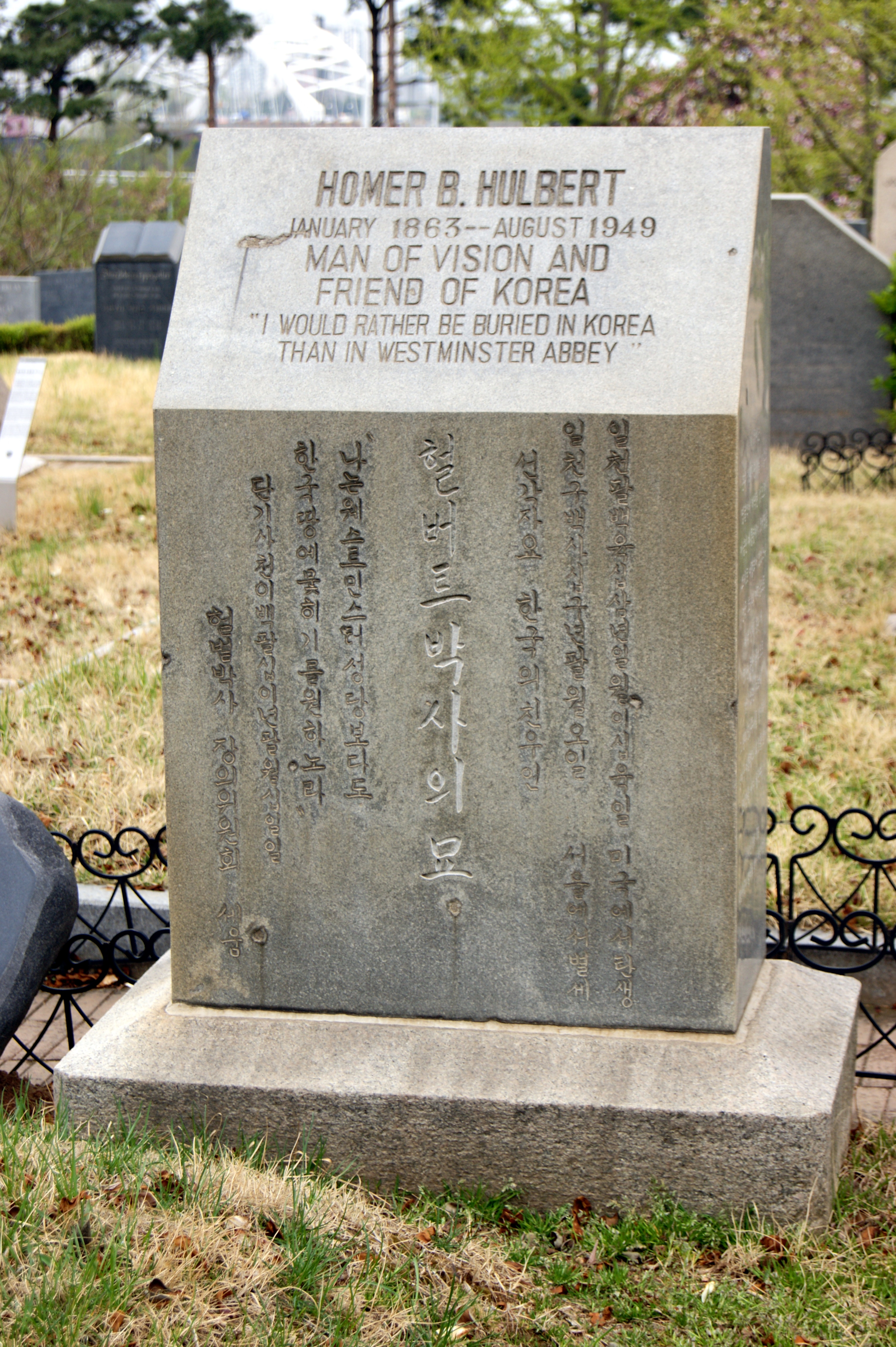
Tombstone at Yanghwajin Foreigners' Cemetery

News of his death prompted nationwide mourning. The Korean Cabinet, chaired by President Rhee, declared a seven-day national mourning period and designated August 9 as a day of official remembrance. A state funeral was organized, and tributes poured in from across the country. In his eulogy, President Rhee called on the nation to carry forward Hulbert’s spirit so that his contributions would endure. Following the service, the funeral procession passed Deoksugung Palace and the South Gate before proceeding to Yanghwajin. Contemporary reports estimated that more than 10,000 people joined the procession.

=== Legacy ===
In the years following his death, the Republic of Korea formally recognized Hulbert’s lifelong commitment to Korean independence. He was posthumously awarded the Order of Merit for National Foundation (건국공로훈장) in 1950. Subsequent honors included the Order of Merit for Culture and Art—Gold (금관문화훈장) in 2014 and the inaugural Seoul Arirang Award (서울아리랑상) in 2015.

== Selected bibliography ==
- Saminpilji (사민필지), Methodist Mission Press, Seoul, 1891
- The Sign of the Jumma, The Century Co., 1903
- In Search of a Siberian Klondike, The Century Co., 1903
- Daedongginyeon (大東紀年), Shanghai, 1903
- A Comparative Grammar of The Korean and The Dravidian Languages, Methodist Mission Press, Seoul, 1905
- The History of Korea, Methodist Mission Press, Seoul, 1905
- The Passing of Korea, William Heinemann, London & Doubleday Page & Co., New York, 1906
- The Japanese in Korea, Seoul, 1907
- The History of Korea (대한력ᄉᆞ), Methodist Mission Press, Seoul, 1908
- A Conflict in the Dark, St.Nicholas, 1917
- Omjee The Wizard, Milton Bradley Co.,1925
- The Face in The Mist, Milton Bradley Co.,1926
- The Mummy Bride, Northwestern College of Speech Arts, 1928
- Play Ball, Northwestern College of Speech Arts, 1929
- Korea Must Be Free, The Korean Commission to America and Europe, 1930
- “Echoes of The Orient," unpublished, circa 1925–1930
- “Hulbert’s Manuscripts,” unpublished, circa 1925–1930
- “Hulbert’s Memorandum,” unpublished, 1928
