= Korea Review =

Korea Review may refer to:

- The Korea Review (1901) – magazine published in the Korean Empire from 1901 to 1906
- Korea Review (1919) – magazine published in the United States from 1919 to 1922
