= The Christian News =

1897–1914 newspaper in Korea

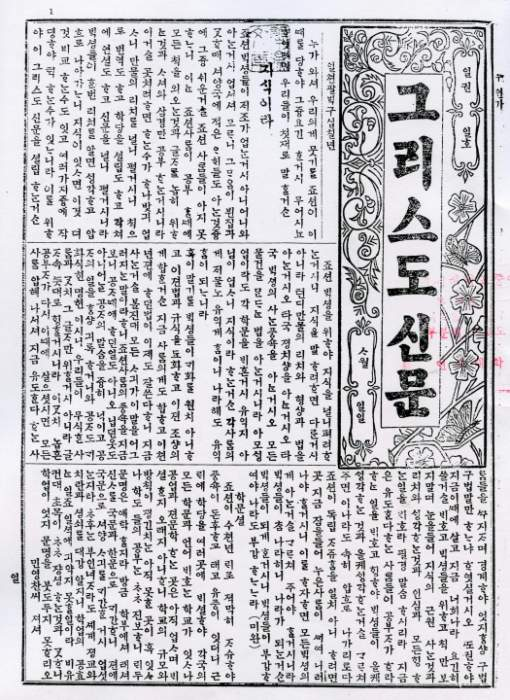
- First page of its inaugural edition (April 1, 1897)
- Founder(s): Horace Grant Underwood
- Publisher: Trilingual Press
- Founded: April 1, 1897
- Language: Korean (Hangul)
- Ceased publication: August 1914
- City: Seoul
- Country: Joseon, Korean Empire, Korea, Empire of Japan

The Christian News (Korean: 예수교회보) was a Korean-language Christian newspaper published in Korea from 1897 to 1914. It changed its Korean name several times; it was founded as 그리스도신문 and renamed 예수교신보 on December 3, 1907. It received its final name in 1910. It published in the native Korean script Hangul.

It was the second Christian newspaper to be published in Korea (after The Korean Christian Advocate). In 1905, it became the first non-denominational Protestant newspaper in Korea, after The Korean Christian Advocate was effectively merged into it. The two papers split again in 1910, and then again merged in 1915 to form the Kidok Sinbo, which lasted until 1937.

As of 2020, the Korean Christian Museum had 39 issues in its collection, and 200 issues total are accounted for in various collections.

== History ==
Korea (then Joseon) had previously been isolationist for centuries, and Christianity was still uncommon there by the late 1800s. In 1896, an article entitled "The Literary Needs of Korea" was published in the journal The Korean Repository. It argued for the need in creating more Christian Korean-language literature.

The newspaper published its first issue on April 1, 1897. Its founder was American Presbyterian missionary Horace Grant Underwood. It was published by the Trilingual Press. It initially began with eight pages per issue, but later increased this to ten pages and twelve on Easter and Christmas. It was closely related to The Korean Christian Advocate, another Korean-language newspaper which had been founded by Methodist missionaries just two months before and printed by the same publisher. However, Underwood wanted his publication to be less overtly Christian, and did much of the early editing and writing for the publication himself.

Articles were often written in English then translated into Korean by Underwood and his Korean-speaking staff. In its early years under Underwood, the paper covered a diverse range of topics; it published on science, technology, agriculture, and explained Western culture. Only several pages were dedicated to Christianity. Sometimes articles would be submitted by Korean Christians; they shared their religious experiences and their hopes for Korea's modernization and support for the Korean independence movement.

The paper and its staff were monitored by the Korean government, as Christianity and modernization sentiments were seen skeptically around this time. In response, the newspaper made an effort to not speak badly about native Korean religious practices, and advocated for loyalty to the monarchy. The Korean monarch Gojong was reportedly a fan of the paper. He once ordered the purchase of 467 of its issues for distribution in government offices across the country. The paper published a special edition on Gojong's birthday, and in 1897 they gave photos of Gojong as gifts to people who purchased yearly subscriptions. This was the first time in Korean history that photos of a Korean monarch were made widely available to the public.

Around 1900, The Korean Christian Advocate ceased publication. Around 1905, The Christian News was made into a unified Protestant paper, and included the Methodist staff of the former The Korean Christian Advocate. It published the first unified issue on July 1, 1905. Its editor-in-chief was James Scarth Gale. Gale was assisted by Elmer Cable, Jacob Moose, and Samuel Forman Moore. Charles Vinton managed the paper's finances. Around this time, each issue had 12 to 20 pages. The paper became more explicitly religious around this time, with more of its writing being Christian.

The newspaper changed its Korean name to 예수교신보 on December 3, 1907. It reduced the number of pages in each issue to 8 pages, and reduced its publication frequency to every other week.

The newspaper closed on February 21, 1910, and split back into the Methodist The Korean Christian Advocate (그리스도회보) and Presbyterian The Christian News (예수교회보) papers. The Christian News resumed publication on the 28th as a weekly paper. Gale served as the Presbyterian paper's first president. Around this time, it was owned by a stock company with capital of 1,000 won and a circulation of 3,700. It appointed its first Korean editor, Kim Wŏn-kŭn (김원근).

It stopped publishing in August 1914. The two papers eventually merged back together, and on December 8, 1915, were succeeded by the Kidok Sinbo.
