= Henry Appenzeller =

American missionary to Korea (1858–1902)

Henry Gerhard Appenzeller
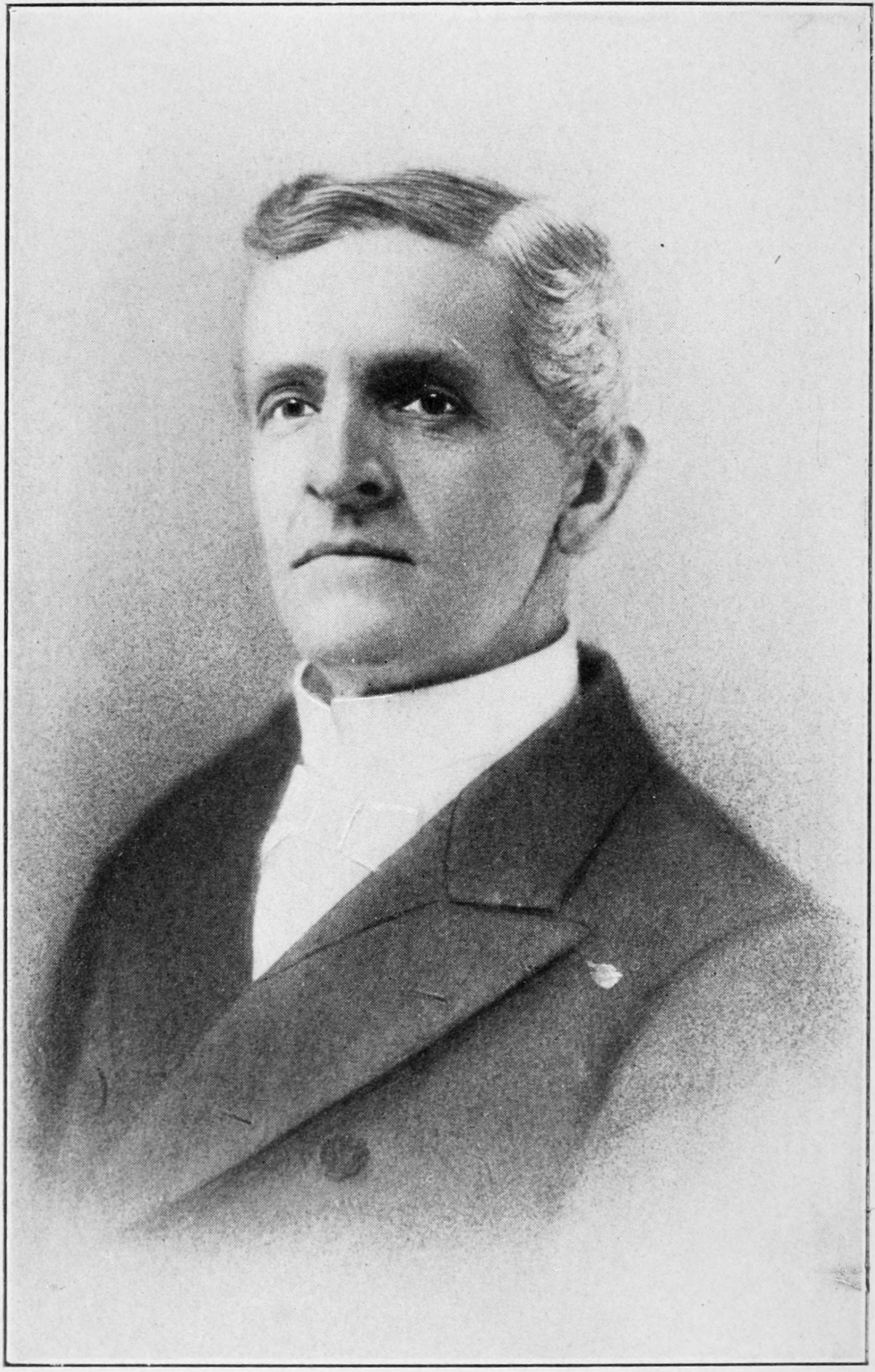
- Born: Henry Gerhard Appenzeller; February 6, 1858; Souderton, Pennsylvania, U.S.
- Died: June 11, 1902 (aged 44); Korean Empire
- Occupation: Methodist missionary who introduced Christianity to Korea

Rev. Henry Gerhard Appenzeller (February 6, 1858 – June 11, 1902) was an American Methodist missionary. He and four other missionaries, including Horace N. Allen, Horace G. Underwood, William B. Scranton, and Mary F. Scranton introduced Protestant Christianity to Korea from 1885 to 1902. He was known for his three major contributions to Korea: the Paichai College Hall, the First Methodist Episcopal Church of Seoul, and the translated New Testament.

== Background and early life ==
Henry Gerhard Appenzeller was born in Souderton, Pennsylvania, in 1858. His mother was Swiss Mennonite, while his father was from Pennsylvania. His parents went to the German Reformed Church. His mother played an important role in his life. She influenced the faith of Henry and his two brothers by reading the German Bible on Sunday afternoons with them. His mother spoke German but little English; therefore, German was Henry's first language. He grew up speaking Pennsylvania German in his home. His fluency in both written and spoken German later allowed him to communicate easily with Germans in America, Europe, and Korea. Henry was transformed due to a personal spiritual experience on October 6, 1876. He celebrated this day as his spiritual birthday every year. He studied at Franklin and Marshall College, a private residential liberal arts college based on the Reformed Church, where he studied ancient languages and held a particular interest in Greek language and literature. Henry also studied and became fluent in biblical languages and French.

He joined the Methodist Episcopal Church in Lancaster at the age of twenty- one, three years after his conversion. Then he served in the church as a Methodist preacher. After that, he attended Drew Theological Seminary, a theological school. During his studies at Drew Theological Seminary, he joined the overseas missionary service. Before Appenzeller sailed to Korea, he married Ella Dodge. They had three children together. Their daughter Alice Rebecca Appenzeller was the first American born in Korea.

== Work in Korea ==
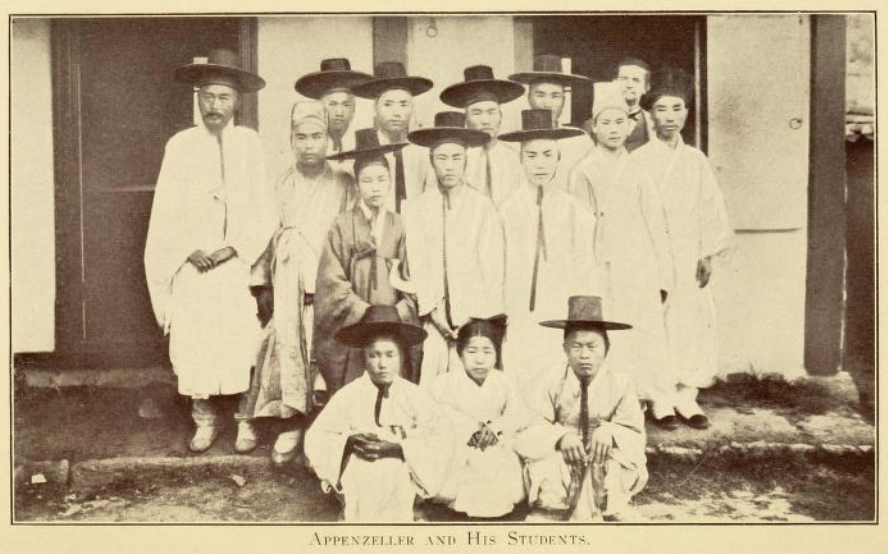
Henry Appenzeller and his students

Appenzeller arrived in Korea on April 5, 1885, an Easter Sunday morning, with his wife Ella Appenzeller. During that period, Seoul was in political struggle. Missionaries could not set up a church, nor preach in public. Evangelism had to be done secretly. Appenzeller focused on preparing a missionary residence in the first two years. In 1887, worship in public became possible, therefore, a chapel was established for services. His goal was to transform Pagan Korea into Christian Korea.

Appenzeller was the founder of a boys' school, Paichai Hakdang—Hall for the Rearing of Useful Men in Korea in 1887. It is the predecessor of Pai Chai University and Paichai Middle & High school. In 1885, he became the founder of the first Korean Methodist Church, Chungdong First Methodist Church, and he also established many Protestant institutions. He served at Chong Dong as a pastor in 1887 until his death in 1902. In 1886, Appenzeller was on the Board of Bible Translators with the other Methodist and Presbyterian missionaries and other Korean translators. He helped to translate the Bible into Korean. He founded the first Christian newspaper in Korea, The Korean Christian Advocate on February 2, 1897.

== Death ==
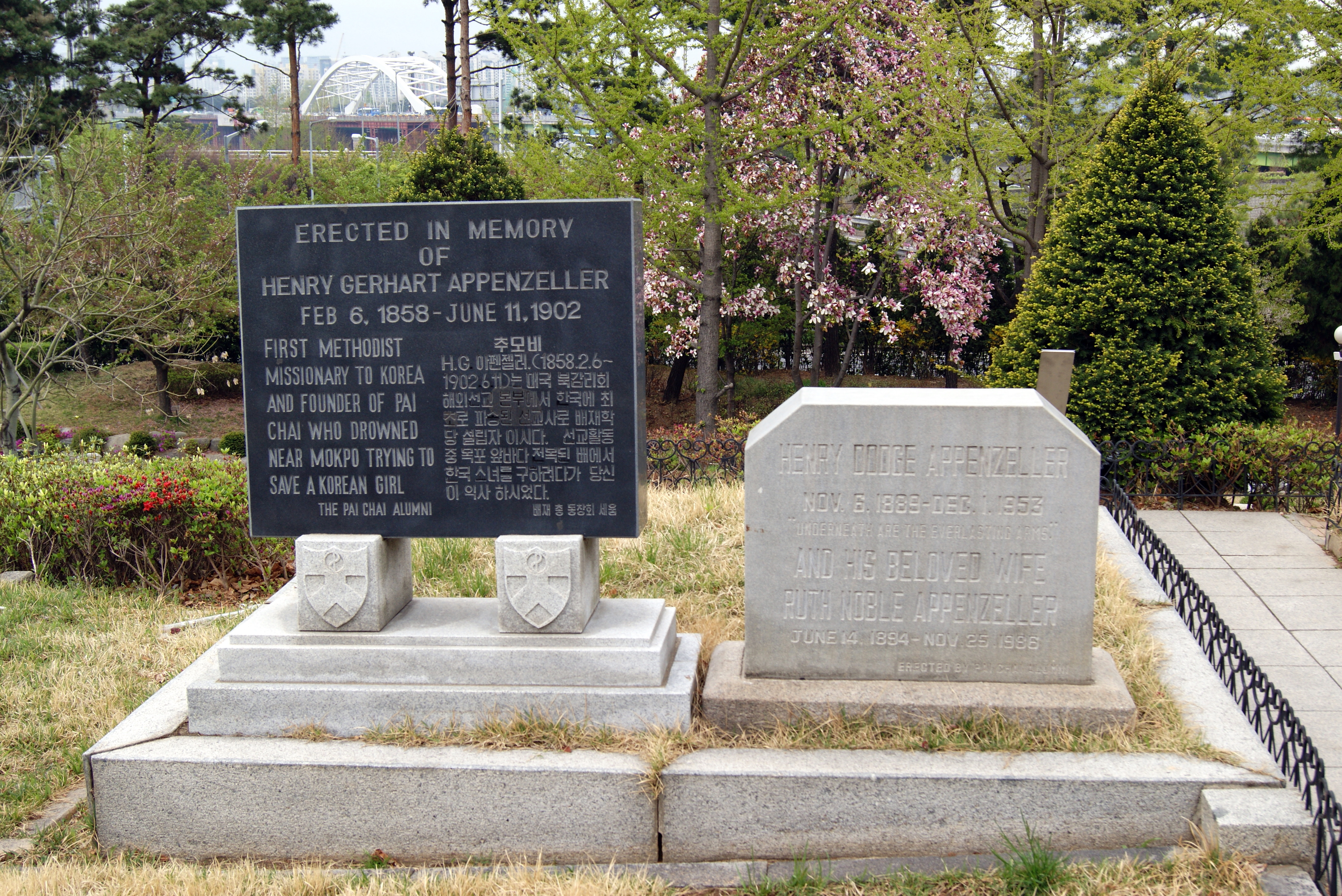
Cenotaph at Yanghwajin Foreign Missionary Cemetery

In June 1902, at the age of 44, Appenzeller was traveling to a southern port city, Mokpo, to attend a meeting for the Bible translation. He sailed aboard the Kumagawa Maru, a steamship which collided suddenly at night with another vessel. The loss of life on the Kumagawa Maru was 27 in all. A survivor, one Mr Bowlby, describes the speed of the sinking followed by the boiler bursting. Appenzeller is thought to have fatally delayed his escape from the vessel by trying to wake a Korean woman and her child so as to get them out of their cabin. A cenotaph in his honor was erected at the Yanghwajin Foreigners' Cemetery, the gravesite of over 300 foreigners including over 80 missionaries from many denominations including those sent by the United Methodist Church, and its predecessor denominations in the late 19th and early 20th centuries.

== Legacy ==
The presence of Christian missionaries was permitted into Korea as part of a controversial policy of modernisation and Westernisation by the Korean Empress Myeongseong. Historian Daniel M. Davies examined Appenzeller's missionary activities in the context of American Protestant ideals, arguing that his vision for Korea included not only Christian conversion but also national independence, democratic reform, and modernization (Davies, 1992). Since its founding in the 19th century, the Korean Methodist Church has dramatically developed as one of major Protestant denominations in Korea. In 2001, the denomination comprised 5,262 churches, 1,394,514 members, and 7,298 ministers. There were six universities established under the Methodist model, including Pai Chai. In addition, the denomination had its own theological seminary, the Methodist Theological Seminary in Seoul. It also had six theological institutes and 54 junior high and high schools.

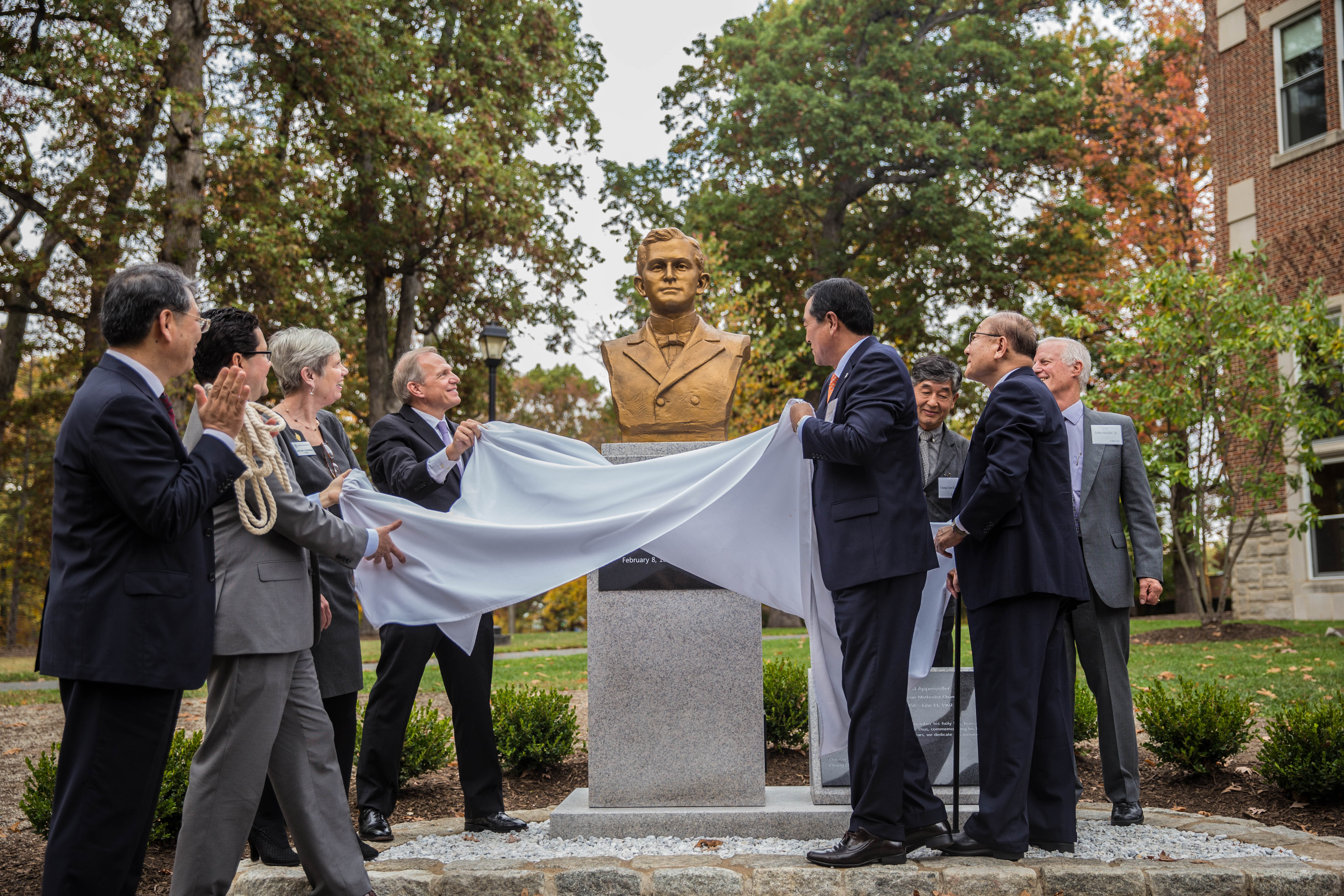
Rev. Dr. Sehyoung Lee, Dean Javier Viera, Bishop John Schol, Rev. Ki-Sung Song, Arist Changgon Kim, and other dignitaries celebrate the installation of a bronze bust of Appenzeller at Drew Theological School.

On October 21, 2016, a bronze bust of Appenzeller was dedicated on the campus of Drew Theological School as a gift from the Chungdong First Methodist Church in Seoul, South Korea. Rev. Dr. Sehyoung Lee, the English Ministry Pastor of Chungdong, said: "For the people of Chungdong and Methodists in Korea, it's as if Appenzeller came to Korea, gave himself up, and now 130 years later, we're expressing our deep gratitude by bringing him back."

== Biography ==
For a full biography see:

William Elliot Griffis A Modern Pioneer in Korea: The Life Story of Henry G Appenzeller (1912) Fleming H. Revell Company, London & Edinburgh. Griffis was an enthusiast for Japanese not Joseon (Korean) culture, which in parts appears in his narrative.

== See also ==
- James Scarth Gale
- William D. Reynolds
- 19th-century Protestant missions in China
- Christianity in Korea
- List of Protestant missionaries in China
- Society in the Joseon dynasty
