= Kumnan Methodist Church =

Church in Seoul, South Korea

- Hangul: 금란교회
- Hanja: 金蘭敎會
- Revised Romanization: Guemnan Gyohoe
- McCune–Reischauer: Kŭmnan Kyohoe

Kumnan Methodist Church (KMC; Korean: 금란교회) is the Korean Methodist Church-affiliated church in Mangu-dong, Jungnang District, Seoul, South Korea. It has 140,000 members and is known as the world's largest Methodist church. The 19th World Methodist Conference was held in the Kumnan Methodist Church.
