= The Korea Review (1901) =

1901–1906 academic magazine

The Korea Review (Korean: 코리아 리뷰) was a monthly English-language academic magazine published from January 1901 to December 1906 in the Korean Empire for a total of 72 issues. The publication was compiled by Homer Hulbert, published by Trilingual Press, and was a successor publication to The Korean Repository, a similar publication published from 1882 to 1899. The publication is now considered a valuable resource on the history of Korea at this time.

== History ==
Homer Hulbert first arrived in Korea in 1886 as a teacher. He worked on publishing The Korean Repository beginning in 1892. In 1899, both that publication and the English-language newspaper The Independent ceased publication, leaving a void of English-language publications about Korea. Hulbert began publishing Korea Review and served as its editor beginning in January 1901.

The publication was aimed at introducing Korea to both the Westerners in Korea and abroad. Each issue had around 40 to 50 pages long. Articles covered a variety of topics, including Korean history, culture, language, politics, law, science, religion, and literature. Hulbert had a regular column in the magazine entitled "The History of Korea" that he published serially beginning in the first issue; he eventually compiled the column into a book.

The magazine had editorials on current events and politics. Its early issues had a more favorable impression of Japan, as they thought the country could be a positive influence in Korea's modernization. However, upon the conclusion of the 1904–1905 Russo-Japanese War, the articles became more critical of Japan's encroachment on Korean sovereignty. Hulbert was a vocal Korean independence activist, and voiced such opinions in the magazine.

The magazine ceased publication without prior notice after its December 1906 issue. This was possibly due to Japan's influence, as Japan had assumed indirect control over Korea.

== See also ==
- List of newspapers in Korea
