= George Heber Jones =

American missionary in Korea (1867–1919)

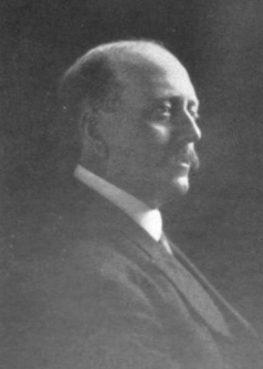

Korean name
- Hangul: 조원시
- Hanja: 趙元時
- RR: Jo Wonsi
- MR: Cho Wŏnsi

George Heber Jones (August 14, 1867 – May 11, 1919) was an American Christian missionary in Korea. Jones, who grew up in Utica, New York, is notable as the first Protestant missionary in Korea who took an academic approach to the research of Korean religions.

== Career ==
=== Mission in Korea ===
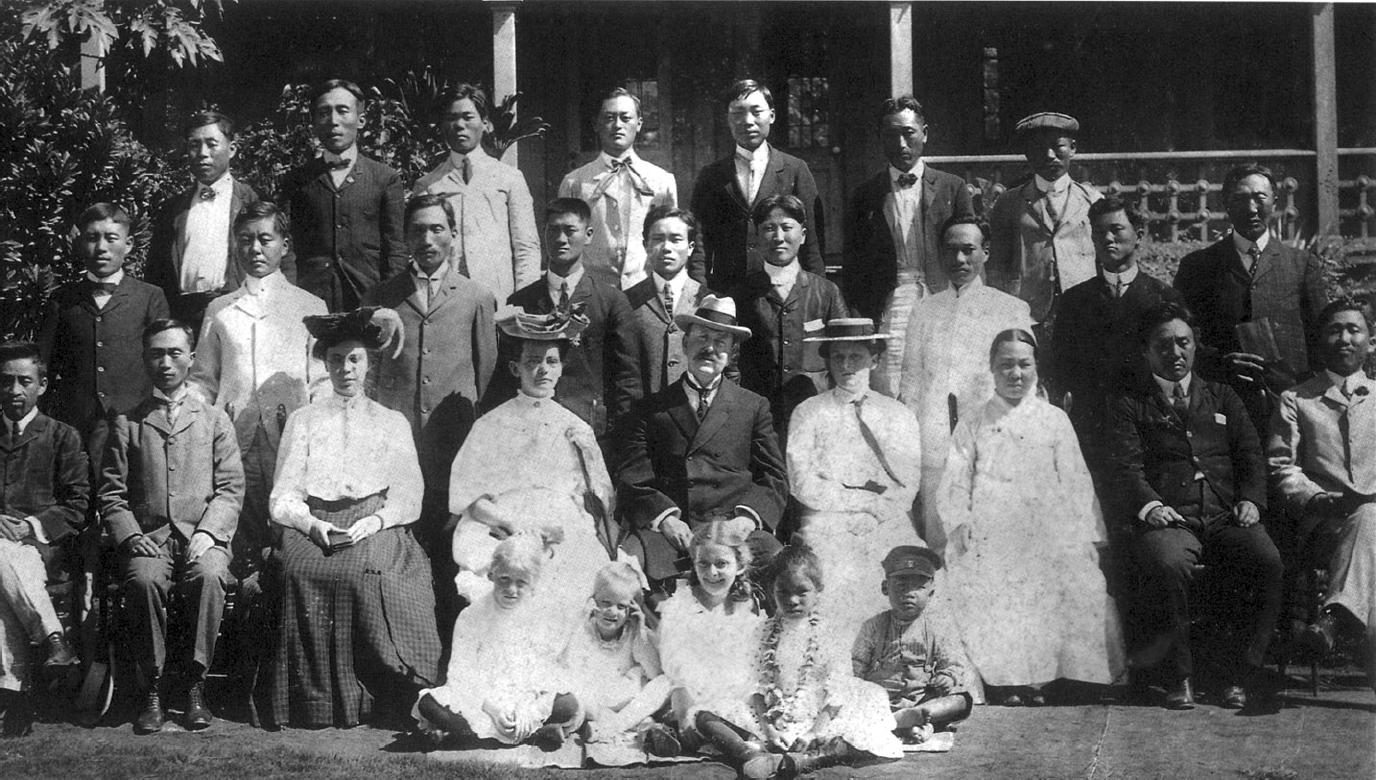
George Heber Jones (front center) during a 1906 visit to the Honolulu Methodist Church

Jones arrived in Korea in 1887 as a Methodist minister; while there, he not only made major contributions to the spread of Christianity in Korea, but also founded three academic journals: The Korean Repository, The Korean Review, and Shinhak Wolbo (Theology Monthly). He also played a significant role in encouraging Korean immigration to Hawaii; of the first ship of Korean migrant laborers bound for Hawaii to work on sugar plantations there, which departed on December 22, 1902, more than half came from his church in Chemulpo (present-day Incheon). In July 1907, he was the subject of a murder attempt; Yale University professor George Trumbull Ladd attributed the attack to opinions Jones had expressed in an article he wrote about the suppression of a Korean riot, in which he praised the Japanese police. In general, Jones had a high opinion of Koreans but not of the conditions in Korean society; in particular, he wrote high praise for Korean migrants in Hawaii, attributing their success in their adopted land to their liberation from "the oppressive weight of past tradition, language, [and] association". He died in Miami on May 11, 1919, after a long illness; his funeral was held in Leonia, New Jersey, four days later. His Korean name was 조원시(Jo Won-si).

== Works ==
- Korea: The Land, People, and Customs (1907)
- The Korean Repository, Volume 2 (1895)

== Personal life ==
He was married to Margaret Josephine Bengel.
