= Nodie Kimhaekim Sohn =

- Hangul: 노디 김 손
- Revised Romanization: Nodi Gim Son
- McCune–Reischauer: Nodi Kim Son

Birth name
- Hangul: 김혜숙
- Revised Romanization: Gim Hyesuk
- McCune–Reischauer: Kim Hyesuk

Nodie Kimhaekim Sohn (29 October 1898 Koksan Hwanghae – 1972) was a Korean-American church and community leader in the Territory of Hawaii. Arriving in Hawaii in 1905, she graduated from Oberlin College in 1918. During her career, Sohn held leadership positions with the Korean Ladies Relief Society (president), Korean Missions in Honolulu (trustee; treasurer), Korean Christian Church (trustee), Korean Old Men’s Home (director), Republic of Korea Office of Procurement (director), and Korean Red Cross (vice-president). Influenced by and supportive of Syngman Rhee, she served as manager and liaison of Tongjihoe (동지회), as well as principal of the Korean Christian Institute, which Rhee co-found.

== Bibliography ==
- Maffly-Kipp, Laurie F.; Schmidt, Leigh E.; Valeri, Mark (14 July 2006). Practicing Protestants: Histories of Christian Life in America, 1630–1965. JHU Press. ISBN 978-0-8018-8361-3.
