= Pai Chai University =

University in Daejeon, South Korea

Coordinates: 36.3206°N 127.3662°E

- 배재대학교
- Motto: 크고자 하거든 남을 섬기라.
- Motto in English: Whoever would be great among you must be your servant.
- Type: Private
- Established: 1885
- President: Kim, Wook
- Academic staff: 310
- Administrative staff: 570
- Students: 14,199
- Undergraduates: 8220
- Postgraduates: 1,017
- Location: 155-40, Baejae-ro, Seo-gu, Daejeon, South Korea
- Campus: Urban
- Mascot: Tiger, Ginkgo biloba, Yulan magnolia
- Website: pcu.ac.kr

Korean name
- Hangul: 배재대학교
- Hanja: 培材大學校
- RR: Baejae daehakgyo
- MR: Paejae taehakkyo

Pai Chai University (Korean: 배재대학교) is a private university located in Daejeon, South Korea. It is one of the oldest modern universities in the country. Its campus is located in Seo-gu, in Daejeon metropolitan city, on the lower slopes of Yeonja Mountain. It has a present-day student body of about 14,000. Undergraduate programs are administered by the Colleges of Humanities, Foreign Studies, Business Administration, Social Sciences, Tourism Management, Natural Sciences, Engineering, Performing Inter-media Arts and Fine Arts. Numerous graduate programs in these fields are provided as well.

== History ==
The school was founded by the missionary Henry Appenzeller in 1885, not long after the Joseon government had legalized Christianity and reformed the national educational system. At that time it was known as Baejae Hakdang (배재학당), which might be rendered as "Pai Chai Academy." It was officially established as a college in 1895.

== Symbols ==
The tiger is an animal that appears many times in the legend and fables of Korea, and it has both intimacy and courage. Tiger, a symbol of disembowelment, symbolizes intimacy, ambition, and bravery based on the personality and scholarship of disloyal people.

Ginkgo has been widely distributed on the earth since 150 million years ago and is very strong in cold and wind. The ginkgo tree is a symbol of exuberant tradition and prosperity of the future.

Yulan is a flower that endures the cold of winter and blooms in early spring in the spring, and is loved by many people. Symbolizing the disloyalty, Yulan is a flower that indirectly submits the sublime spirit and purity of the evicted people.

== Colleges ==
Pai Chai University has 6 colleges.

- College of Humanities and Social Sciences
- College of business school
- College of Life and Health
- College of AI/SW Creative Convergence
- College of Arts and Culture
- College of Ju Si Kyung (Liberal Arts)

== Graduate schools ==
- Graduate Programs
- Graduate School of Information and Communications
- Graduate School of International Business and Commerce
- Graduate School of Law
- Graduate School of Tourism Management
- Graduate School of Public Administration

== See also ==
- List of colleges and universities in South Korea
- Education in South Korea
