= Korean Methodist Church =

Methodist denomination in South Korea

The Korean Methodist Church (Korean: 기독교대한감리회; Hanja: 基督敎大韓監理會) is a large Methodist denomination in South Korea and the rest of the world, with approximately 1.5 million members. Methodist missionaries came from the United States in the late 19th century. It became independent in 1930, and celebrated its centennial in 1984. The denomination has ties with its mother church, the United Methodist Church.

Rev. Kim Jung-seok (Kwanglim Church) has been elected as the 30th presiding bishop of the Korean Methodist Church.

== History ==
The Korean Methodist Church had its origins when American Methodist missionaries arrived on the Korean peninsula in 1885. As the Church grew, it was under the oversight of American Methodist churches. In 1930, the Korean Methodist Church was granted full autonomy. After the end of the Japanese occupation of Korea, the majority of their churches had been damaged during the Second World War. Bishop Lew Hyungki spent most of his tenure as head of the Korean Methodist Church in the United States raising money to restore them. With the support of American Methodist bishops, $1.6 million was raised for the Korean Methodist Church.

In 1931, the Korean Methodist Church voted in favour of ordaining women as pastors, with Jeon Mil La becoming the Church's first ordained woman pastor. This made them one of the first denominations in Korea to ordain women.

== Church's political views and actions ==
In 2023, the church suspended and later excommunicated one of their pastors, Lee Dong-hwan, for his support of LGBT rights. The South Korean courts granted an injunction to suspend the excommunication the following year. The denomination later announced that it would not accept pastors who support or endorse homosexuality.

== See also ==
- Chungdong First Methodist Church
- Kumnan Methodist Church
