= The Korean Repository =

1892–1899 English-language publication in Korea

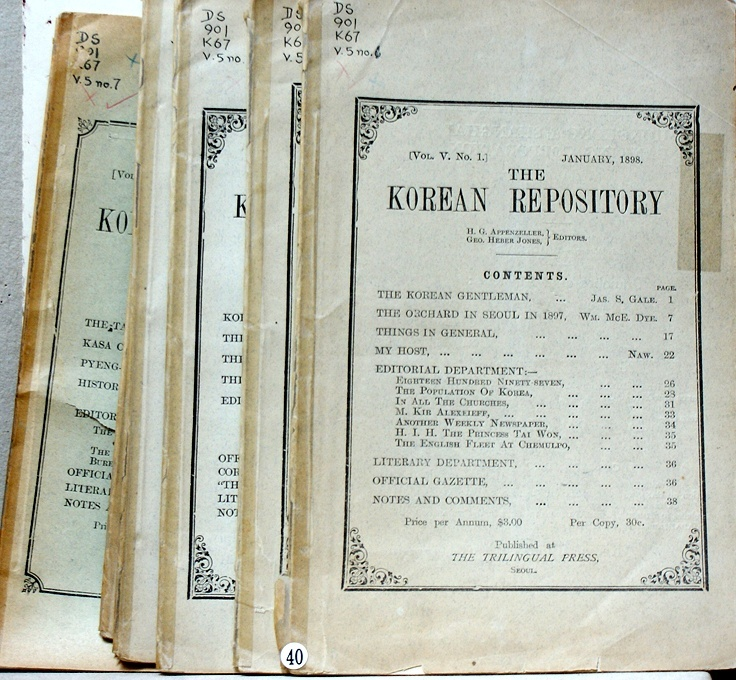
- Various issues from 1898
- Editor: Homer Hulbert
- Frequency: Monthly
- First issue: January 1892
- Final issue: December 1898 (Magazine); June 1899 (Newspaper)

The Korean Repository was the name for both a monthly English-language magazine published in Korea from January 1892 to December 1898 and a successor weekly newspaper from around February to June 1899. It was the first English-language monthly magazine published in Korea.

== Description ==
The magazine was originally founded by Methodist missionaries. Its first issue was released in January 1892. American Korean independence activist Homer Hulbert was a notable contributor to the journal. For example, he contributed a number of articles in which he praised the native Korean alphabet Hangul. Hulbert returned to the United States in 1891, and the publication went on hiatus around 1892. When Hulbert returned in 1893, he took over the Trilingual Press and resumed publication of The Korean Repository.

The journal published on a variety of topics, including current events, Korean history, Korean studies, and even geopolitics. It analyzed Korea's relationship with the Russian Empire at the time. The journal also published articles from Koreans, with notable politicians such as Yun Chi-ho contributing writing. Hulbert later assisted the first private Korean newspaper, Tongnip sinmun, with its establishment and printing technology.

In later years, it often sharply criticized the Empire of Japan's actions and policies in Korea.

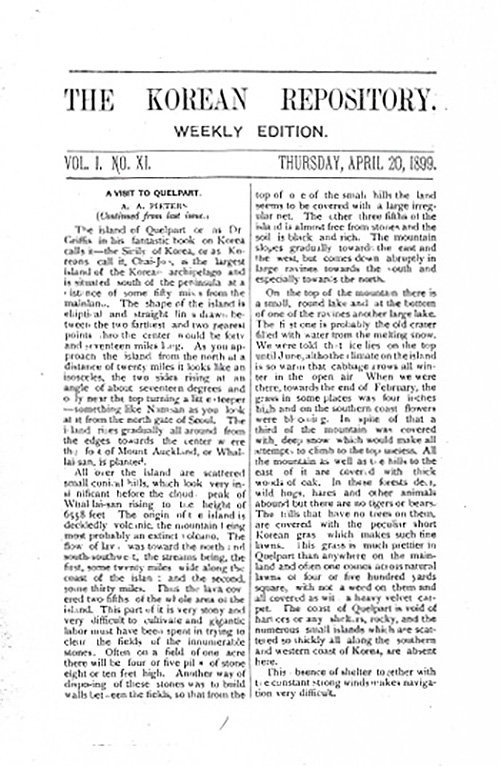
Cover of the April 20, 1899 weekly newspaper

The magazine ceased publication in 1898. It was briefly revived as a weekly newspaper with four or six pages from February to June 1899. Later, in 1901, Hulbert published The Korea Review with a similar format and content to The Korean Repository.

The journal and newspaper are now considered valuable resources for understanding the politics, culture, and history of Korea around that period.
