= Ewha Girls' High School =

Private school in Seoul, South Korea

Ewha Girls' High School 이화여자고등학교
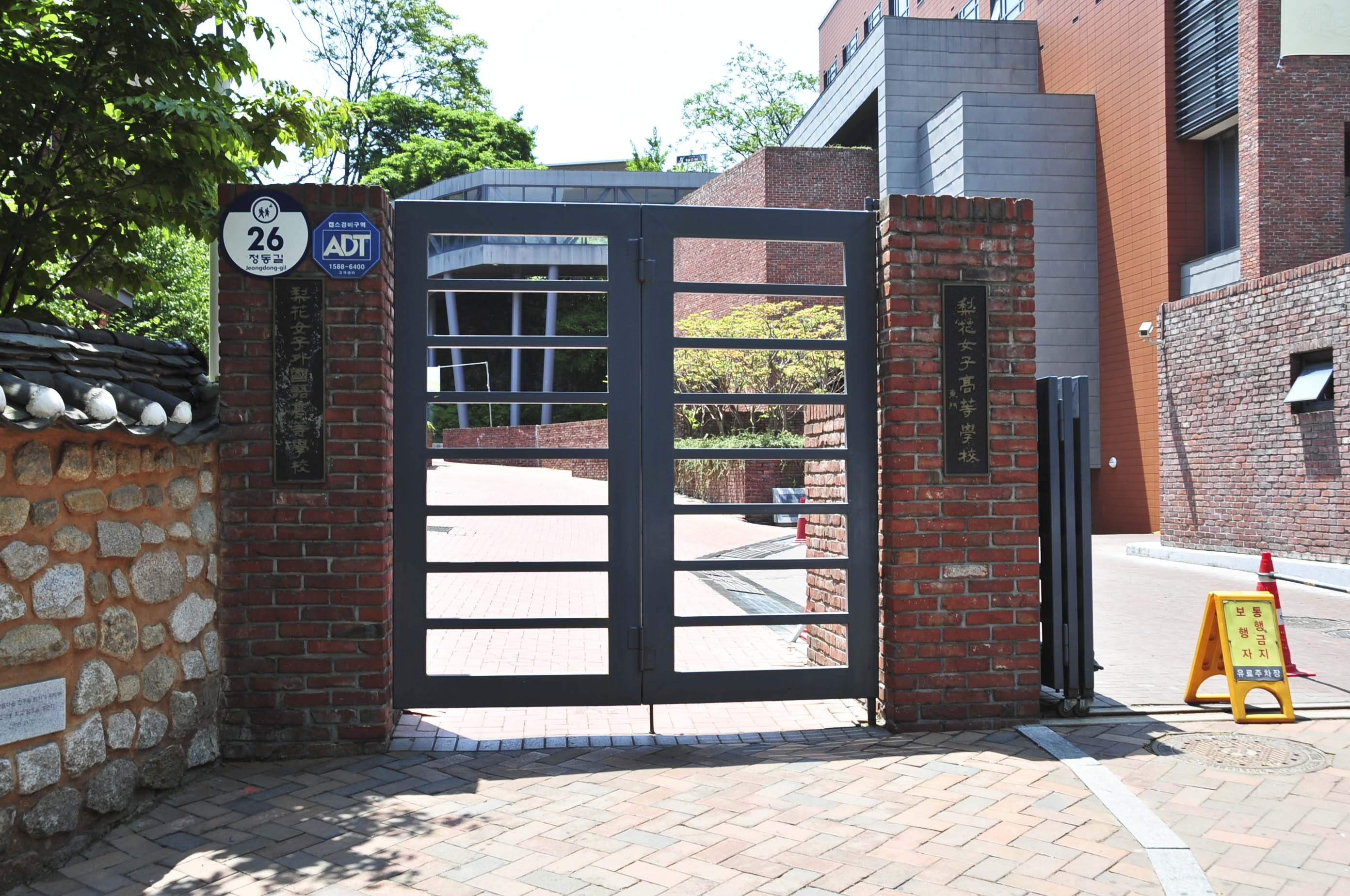
- May 28, 2011

Location
- Jeongdong-gil 26; Jung District, Seoul; South Korea

Information
- Type: Private
- Motto: Freedom, Love, Peace (자유, 사랑, 평화)
- Established: 1886
- Founder: Mary F. Scranton
- Principal: Park Young-Hye (박영혜)
- Gender: Girls
- Website: www.ewha.hs.kr

Ewha Girls' High School (Korean: 이화여자고등학교) is a private girls' high school located in Jeong-dong, Jung District, Seoul, South Korea. Although managed by the same foundation, it is not to be confused with the coeducational Ewha Womans University High School (founded 1958), which is located near Ewha Woman's University in Seodaemun District and functions as the demonstration school attached to the university's College of Education.

== History ==
Ewha Girls' High School originates from the Ewha Hakdang mission school for girls founded on May 31, 1886, by Mary F. Scranton. The school expanded to offer college-level courses, with the college section eventually separating to become Ewha Womans University. The construction of a dormitory for staff and students was completed in 1900. The current principal Kim Hye-jeong was appointed in February 2017 as the school's 15th principal.

== Co-curricular activities ==
At Ewha Girls' High School, every student has to join a club as part of their co-curricular activities. Ewha Girls' High School has 34 clubs which can be classified into five categories — academics, performance, service, media/debate, arts/physical education.

=== Academics section 1 ===
Club	Description
심리	Psychology
주먹도끼	History
Minerva	Economic management
PASCH	German studies(Partner school of Goethe Institut)
아르테	Library
지오누리	Geography

=== Academics section 2 ===
Club	Description
Brain-Storm	Brain science
Ctrl-C	Coding
Physica	Physics
BIO	Biology
Curie	Chemistry
Hypatia	Math
별아해	Astronomy

=== Performance ===
Club	Description
선교중창단	Missionary Choir
성극반	Drama
한맥	Pungmul
합창단	Choir
EBS	Educational broadcasting station
Flight	Dance
Muse	Christian orchestra

=== Service ===
Club	Description
밀알	Missionary outreach projects
샛별	Various voluntary work
옥합	Missionary work
RCY	Red Cross Youth
Y-teen	YMCA teenagers club

=== Media/Debate ===
Club	Description
거울	Editorial club
Bulletin	Creating "The Ewha Bulletin" newsletters
Cosmos	Book/reading debate
KIMC	Expand knowledge and interest of the global society. Mock UN club.
Ebate	English debate
Veritas	Korean debate

But in 2021 Oak, ODIN and ATOM were combined in one debate club named "EBATE".

=== Arts/Physical Education ===
Club	Description
문예창작반	Literary creating
AnC	Manga drawing
Art Factory	Creative art
BOE	PE club (Bring out your energy)
Play	User-created content

== Principals ==
The following is a list of principals of Ewha Girls' High School. The first six leaders were principals and are also counted as the first six presidents of Ewha Womans University.

- 1st: Mary F. Scranton (1886–1890)
- 2nd: Lousia C. Rothweiler (1890–1893)
- 3rd: Josephine O. Paine (1893–1907)
- 4th: Lulu E. Frey (1907–1921)
- 5th: A. Jeanette Walter (1921–1922)
- 6th: Alice Rebecca Appenzeller (1922–1929)
- 7th: Miss E. Church (1929–1938)
- 8th: Shin Bong-jo (1938–1961)
- 9th: Seo Myung-hak (1961–1971)
- 10th: Jeong Hui-gyeong (1971–1982)
- 11th: Shim Chi-seon (1982–1995)
- 12th: Choi Jong-ok (1995–2000)
- 13th: Jeong Chang-yong (2000–2009)
- 14th: Kang Soon-ja (2009–2017)
- 15th: Kim Hye-jeong (2017–2025)
- 16th: Park Young-hye (2025-present)

== Notable alumni ==
=== Academia ===
- Helen Kim - Educator and first woman in Korea to receive a PhD
- Park In-deok - Independence activist and educator
- Chung Hyun-back - former history professor
- Lee Gwang-ja - Former president of Seoul Women's University (2001–2013)
- Ji Eun-hee - Chair-professor at Sangji University and former president of Duksung Women's University (2006.02.28—2013.02.28)
- Cha Kwang Eun - Doctor and professor at Cha University
- So-Young Pi - Professor at Boston University

=== Business ===
- Lee Myung-hee - Chairwoman of Shinsegae Group
- Kim Ye-ri

=== Entertainment/Music ===
- Nam Bo-ra - Actress
- Youn Yuh-jung - Actress
- Lee Eung-kyung - Actress
- Jo Mi-ryung - Actress
- Baek Ji-won - Actress
- Jeon Ye-seo - Actress
- Tymee - Rapper
- Sa Mi-ja - Actress
- Kim Joo-ha - News anchor
- Jin Yang-hye - Announcer and MC
- Chae Seon-yeob - Pianist and soprano singer
- Song Min-doh - Singer
- Song Hye-kyo - Actress
- Park Hye-soo - Actress
- Jungeun Kim Burke - Pianist

=== Literature ===
- Kim Iryeop - Poet, journalist, writer
- In Byung-sun - Poet
- Heo Geun-uk - Writer, novelist
- Oh Jung-hee - South Korean writer

=== Politics ===
- Choi Young-hee - Former member of the National Assembly
- Kang Kyung-wha - Foreign Minister of South Korea
- Kim Mo-im - 36th Minister of Health and Welfare (1998.05.01—1999.05.23)
- Kim Jeong-sook - 6th Commissioner of Korea Food & Drug Administration (2004.09.04—2006.01.31)
- Kim Geum-rae - Former member of the National Assembly
- Kim Jinai - Former member of the National Assembly
- Lee Hee-ho - Former First Lady of South Korea (1998–2003)
- Lee Mi-kyung - Current member of the National Assembly
- Seo Young-hee - Former member of the National Assembly

=== Others ===
- Ryu Gwansun - Korean Independence activist
- Hwang Ae-deok - Independence fighter
- Ha Ran-sa - Independence fighter
- Kim Ransa - Independence fighter
- Esther Pak - Korea's first female doctor of Western medicine
