= Kim Sou =

South Korean painter (1919–2014)

Kim Heungsou
- Born: 17 November 1919; Hamhung, Kankyōnan Province, Korea, Empire of Japan
- Died: 9 June 2014 (aged 94)
- Occupation: Painter
- Writing career
- Period: 1936–2014
- Genres: Art, paint

Korean name
- Hangul: 김흥수
- Hanja: 金興洙
- RR: Gim Heungsu
- MR: Kim Hŭngsu

Kim Heungsou (Korean: 김흥수; Hanja: 金興洙; November 17, 1919 – June 9, 2014), also called Kim Sou, was a South Korean painter who was sometimes called the "Picasso of Korea".

== Biography ==
Born in Hamheung in Korea under Japanese rule, he graduated from Tokyo Art School (東京美術學校). After the independence of the Korean Peninsula, he sat as deputy of Seoul Art high school and lecturer at Seoul National University.

In 1955, he studied painting in Paris, and his works were submitted to Salon d'Automne. Thereafter, he initiated an individual art showcase and held exhibitions several times, starting in Paris, gaining access to the European market. He held exhibitions around the world, including in France and Russia. His works have been featured at international auctions.

After coming back to Seoul, Heungsou was appointed to the panel of judges for the 10th Korea grand art convention and presented his works in 1961. Six years later, he went as an exchange professor at the Pennsylvania Academy of Fine Arts from 1968 to 1980, which allowed him to release his pieces of sculpture, holding a series of travelling exhibitions from coast to coast. American-Korean Foundation served his work from the beginning.

Jang Soo hyun, his partner and executive curator of Kim Heungsou museum died of ovarian cancer in November 2012.

Heungsou died on 9 June 2014 at the age of 94.

== Works ==
Heungsou's works largest body of work is the so-called harmonism paintings, collaborating structures and abstract forms in a piece of artwork. The genesis for his idea came from the harmony of yin and yang, between female and male and between the east and the west.

Fundamental motto of harmonism is to involve in different ideas of surrealism, impressionism and abstractionism. It's the combinations different ideas regardless of its character - from one's own idea or from everyone's commonsense.

—

According to an interview with Ftnews Korea, he was enormously influenced by the idea of Mikhail Gorbachev mixing the philosophy of the East and the West, invited by the Pushkin Museum. After studying Cubism, he became more immersed in paintings. In 1960, he could sell out all his works and entered an exhibition in Paris and later gained the title of the salon, which he said his Japanese counterpart had never achieved registration as a member at the moment.

His works have roots in Harmonism, which is derived from the mixture of abstract paintings and forms/structures. In 1967, he observed the flow of American abstract paintings, which enabled him to try new challenges such as harmonizing abstract paintings with other forms.

Rooted in Mozaic, he realized the partition of hues within his works, which featured Korean customs and arts with erotic subject matters. His works are departed from his philosophy and originated from the Korean peninsula. In this sense, his drawings are famous for their fabulous collaboration of hues and shapes.

Korean media coverage says that the 2010 exhibition in Seoul was the last chance to watch his creative art work, owing to his deteriorated health but he continued to appear in the exhibitions: as a displaced citizen born in what would become North Korea, he presented his work called Lost Hometown (Hangul, 망향) commemorating the twentieth year of the joint entry of the two Koreas into the United Nations, held in the art hall of the National Assembly of South Korea.

== See also ==
- Korean painting
- Korean sculpture
- Korean Art and Architecture
- Shin Saimdang
- Lim Yunjidang
- Park Indeok
- Kim Hwallan
