= Kim Hong-nam =

South Korean art historian (born 1948)

- Hangul: 김홍남
- Hanja: 金紅男
- RR: Gim Hongnam
- MR: Kim Hongnam

Kim Hong-nam (1948-01-23) was the South Korean director of the National Museum of Korea, art historian, and currently professor of Ewha Womans University. Before she moved to Seoul (1991), she served the Asia Society, New York (1988–1991), as the curator in charge of the Rockefeller Collection of Asian Art. Back in her native country Korea, she enjoyed the most distinguished career in Korea's museum field as director of three leading museums, Ewha Womans University Museum (1995–2001), National Folk Museum (2003–2006), and National Museum of Korea (2006–2008). She was also the first woman to hold the position of director at two national museums.

== Biography ==
Kim Hong-nam was born in Jinju, South Korea, on 23 January 1948. While she was still young, her family moved to Busan. Later she was schooled in Seoul, at the Ewha Girls' High School. She studied at Seoul National University (B.A. in Aesthetics) before becoming the first Korean to get a PhD in art history, from Yale University. Ms. Kim's focus was on Chinese painting, her dissertation (Yale 1985) centered on the history of Chinese painting in the 17th century and the aspect of the period's art patronage. In 1980, she was Research Fellow in Asian Art at the Smithsonian Institution. After holding the same position at the Metropolitan Museum of Art in New York City the following year, she joined the University of Maryland, College Park, where she served as a Lecturer/assistant professor from 1982 through 1988. In 1991, she was appointed professor of Art History at South Korea's prestigious Ewha Womans University. In 1995 she began a five-year tenure as director of the Ewha Womans University Museum. In 2003 she was selected as Director of the National Folk Museum of Korea, a position she held until be selected in August 2006 to head the nation's premiere museum. Her legacy at the National Folk Museum includes the expansion of the museum's coverage to the field of folk art and full-remodelling of buildings and modernization of exhibitions. While at the National Museum of Korea, she propagated cultural diversity in collection, exhibition, and education programs, creating Department of Asian Art and Department of Education and improving Asian art collection and galleries. Another of her foci was to increase the number of foreign visitors, which dropped radically with the museum's move to its new facilities.

== Award ==
- 2005 Eighth Korean Museum Association "Best Museum Professional" Award
- 2008 France's national medal of "Légion d'Honneur"
