= Shin-Yeoseong =

First magazine for women in Korea

Shin-Yeoseong (Korean: 신여성, The New Woman Magazine, Shinyeoseong, Sin Yosong) was the first magazine for women in Korea published from 1923 to 1934. It aimed to promote gender equality, challenge Confucian gender conventions, and to redefine the ideal modern woman of the time. Shin-Yeoseong was part of the national women's liberation movement in Korea, and gained popularity by promoting female enlightenment and empowerment. However, there seemed to be various public critique regarding the magazine negatively influencing young girls to pursue a “frivolous” and “shallow” life.

== Background ==
Shin-Yeoseong was the first magazine for women in Korea published by Gaebyeoksa monthly from 1923 to 1934. It was distributed in book stores across the country and was often sold out due to its popularity. This magazine shaped many discussions around women’s agendas such as advocating for gender equality, challenging Confucian gender norms, as well as set the image of an ideal modern women at the time.

The Shin-Yeoseong magazine was part of a nationwide women empowerment movement, partially aimed to go against the traditional ideologies of “Wise Mother, Good Wife”. The notion of “Wise Mother, Good Wife” (hyõnmo yangch’ŏ ), first appeared in Korea in 1906, and was long celebrated as the ideal moral of Korean women. This idea originated from the idea of “good wife and wise mother” in Meiji Japan, but the syntax “Wise Mother” was placed before “Good Wife”. This phrase imposed the expectations of womanly virtue and compliance on Korean women, which reflected the Confucianist ideals of womanhood. After the Japanese annexation of Korea in 1910, the Japanese government systematically promoted this gender ideology, especially by embedding it in Korea's education system. When this idea became more popular, the provision on educating women replaced the old conventional disdain for educated women. This concept was considered progressive at the time because it was seen as liberation for women from premodern conventions by giving them a more dominant position in a household, especially in playing a more effective role in children education. However, the phrase of “women’s liberation” sparked the awakening of modern gender consciousness. “Wise Mother, Good Wife” was soon seen as yet another framework that regulated and confined women to function specifically in domestic spheres of the family. It also became clear that fragments of this ideology was indeed colonial legacy when the colonial government’s aim was to produce an efficient, obedient and submissive imperial workforce. The first documented woman to publicly criticize the idea of “Wise mother, Good Wife” was Na Hye-Sôk. She announced it was simply another male-dominated ideology made to breed docile, submissive and domestic women. Alongside with Kim Won-Ju, they spearheaded the New Woman movement through their writings that focused on secular feminist agendas.

== Content and theme ==
Each issue had about 100 pages that featured a wide range of articles about women in the forms of short stories, essays, and poems. Topics ranged from the latest trends in pop cultures to political discussions. The magazine cover always featured illustrations of Korean women but from the mid-1920s, new faces were brought in. Covers started to feature different ethnicities and cultures, although their faces tend to be portrayed in more simplified ways. Shin-Yeoseong supported female enlightenment by focusing on two groups of women: unmarried women and married women. The main focus for unmarried women was to establish and solidify the understanding of their right to freely date and to choose their own marriage partners. The key aim for married women was to emphasize and spark a change of status in their nuclear family from simply a member of the family to become the female head.

== Media influence ==
Magazines as commodities in the 1920s Korea purposely attracted consumers by using cover images as a visual representation of its content. Aside from merely attracting sales, Shin-Yeoseong (신여성, 1923–1934) instead acted more as a political strategy by demonstrating an ideal modern subject. Publishers of Shin-Yeoseong noticed the female literacy and school enrollment rate was quite low at the time of the Japanese annexation of Korea, so they used hangul instead of Chinese characters. Shin-Yeoseong also chose to use more images over text to make it more intellectually accessible. They especially utilized specific images of women to implicitly deliver and build types of women of the era through repetition. The popularized images of new women by Shin-Yeoseong aimed to create a new horizon for women empowerment by showcasing possibilities of what a Korean woman can be. These images ranged from images of “modern girls”, such as dancers or flappers to more images of obedient housewives. Others include women reading books and schoolgirls, aimed to reflect the rise of interest in women's education and increased female literacy rate. One prominent example of Shin-Yeoseong’s media influence was the new cover illustrations of the magazine by An Seok-ju (안석주,1901–1950). His illustration of a Westernized “modern woman” for the cover of Shin-Yeoseong included features like lighter skin tone, large eyes and straight nose, which became the standard for beauty in women's magazines and newspapers in the 1930s.

== Fashion Styles ==
College students' attire

Modern girls' fashion style (1920s - 1940s)

Shin-Yeoseong, often referred to as Modern Girls in English, were depicted in magazines as young women who defied traditional social norms. They embraced Western-influenced fashion, lifestyles, and attitudes, and many of them attended college. This era represented a notable period of social transformation and modernization in Korea, influenced by Western ideas and education systems introduced during the Japanese colonial period. Modern Girls were regarded as symbols of modernity and social change, often portrayed in media and literature as independent, fashionable, and socially engaged individuals. Their fashion styles in the magazines included Western-style dresses and skirts, often with shorter hemlines compared to traditional Korean attire. While embracing Western fashion, Modern Girls sometimes incorporated elements of traditional Korean dress, such as Hanbok-inspired motifs or fabrics. They popularized the bobbed hairstyle, seen as modern and liberating compared to traditional long hairstyles, and accessorized with hats, gloves, and jewelry, following Western fashion trends of the time.

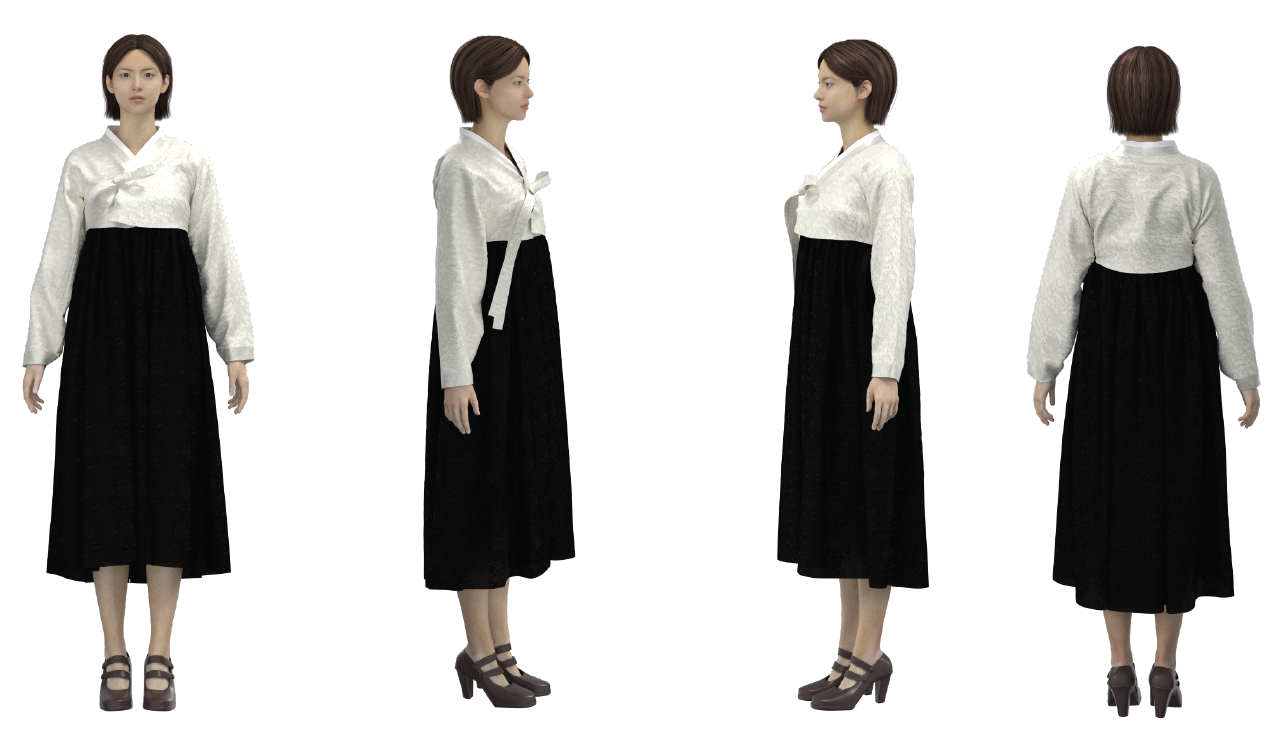
College students' attire

Textiles included Western fabrics like imported silk, cotton, and wool, as well as traditional Korean Hanbok fabrics such as domestic silk and ramie. These textiles often featured Western floral motifs, conveying a sense of femininity and elegance. They also included traditional Korean motifs like cranes, clouds, dragons, or lotus flowers, symbolizing longevity, health, and happiness, which were often depicted through intricate embroidery.

== Sports and Fashion ==
Tennis outfit in 1920s Korea

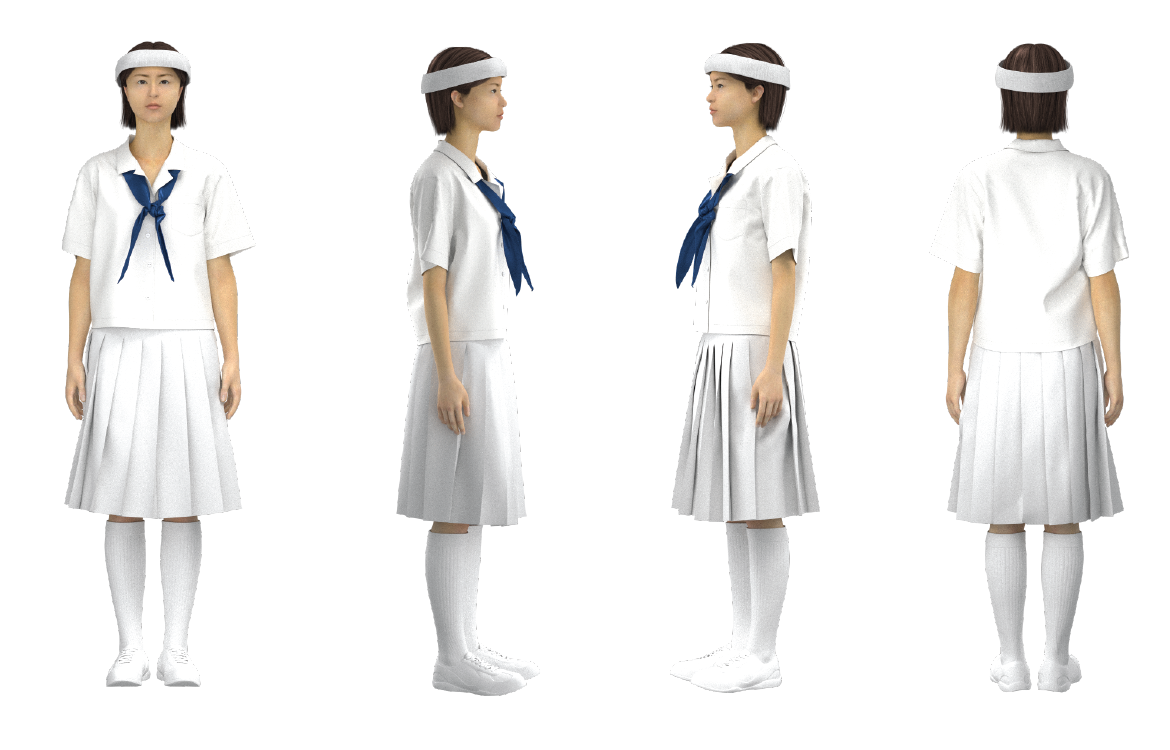
Tennis outfit in 1920s Korea

In 1920s Korea, Western sports, particularly tennis, symbolized modernity and progress. For Korean women, engaging in tennis offered a way to embrace these modern ideals and challenge the restrictive traditional gender roles of the time. During the rapid modernization of Korean society from the 1920s to the 1940s, tennis became popular in schools, particularly those founded by missionaries and institutions promoting modern education for women. These schools incorporated physical education into their curricula, emphasizing the importance of health and activity for women. Participation in tennis and other sports was encouraged as part of this holistic education approach. The introduction of Western sports also brought Western fashion styles to Korea, often featured in magazines. At that time, tennis outfits were influenced by European and American trends, with figures like Suzanne Lenglen popularizing shorter skirts and practical sportswear. The introduction of Western sports also brought Western fashion styles to Korea, often featured in magazines. At that time, tennis outfits were influenced by European and American trends, with figures like Suzanne Lenglen popularizing shorter skirts and practical sportswear. Korean female tennis players typically wore knee-length skirts or dresses that were more practical than traditional hanbok, allowing for better movement while maintaining modesty. Their tops were usually blouses with long or short sleeves, made from lightweight fabrics suited for physical activity. Despite adopting Western styles, Korean tennis attire still adhered to societal expectations of modesty, remaining more conservative than contemporary Western sportswear.
