= Kang Sunghee =

Korean playwright (1921–2009)

- 강성희
- Born: 1921
- Died: 2009 (aged 87–88)
- Spouse: Ryu Kyung-Chai
- Children: Ryu In
- Writing career
- Language: Korean
- Years active: 1965 – 2009

Kang Sunghee (Korean: 강성희; 1921–2009) was a Korean playwright. In 1965, she made her literary debut with the play Jajangga (자장가 Lullaby). Many of her works address problems that women face in the traditional institution of family. Through biographical plays, such as Eodi gasseo, eodi isseo! (어디 갔어, 어디 있어! Where Did You Go, Where Are You!), she successfully showed that men are also victims of old customs while exposing their egocentric and self-righteous aspects. She served as the president of the Korean Playwrights Association from 1981 to 1982.

== Biography ==
Born in Pyongyang in 1921, Kang Sunghee spent her childhood in Andong Province, Manchukuo, because of her father's business. She was able to receive modern education from young age thanks to her parents' wholehearted support. She studied abroad in Japan, where she attended a teacher's school. After Japan lost World War II, Kang returned to Korea and majored in English literature. She said she became interested in writing plays after starring in James Barrie's Quality Street as part of her graduation project. Upon graduation, however, she got a job as an English teacher at a high school and married artist Ryu Kyung-Chai, who taught art at the same school. Marriage, childbirth, and the outbreak of the Korean War delayed her from starting her career in writing. Her dream of becoming a playwright only came true years later.

In 1965, Kang published Jajangga and debuted as a playwright at the age of 45. For over 30 years, she consistently wrote plays. Her play Mwonga dandanhi jalmotdwaetgeodeun (뭔가 단단히 잘못됐거든 Something's Definitely Wrong), published in 1967, received a great deal of attention and was staged several times by college students in the 1970s. From 1970, she was an active member of the Korean Writers Association, Korean Women Writers Association (한국여성문인협회), and the Korean Centre of PEN International. She served as the president of the Korean Playwrights Association from 1981 to 1982 and as a board member of the Korean Centre of PEN the International from 1988 to 1995. In 1997, she became a member of the National Academy of Arts of the Republic of Korea.

Kang's 1986 play Huinkkot maeul (흰꽃 마을 White Blossom Village) earned her a PEN International Literary Award in 1987 and the Literary Drama Award (희곡문학상) from the Korean Playwright Association in 1988. In 1996, a complete collection of her plays was published in 1996, and, in recognition of her literary achievement, she received the Korean Literature Award in the same year. For her contribution to Korean culture, she received the Republic of Korea's Bogwan Order of Cultural Merit in 1998 and the National Academy of Arts Award in 2000. Her husband, artist Ryu Kyung-Chai, died in 1995, followed by their son, sculptor Ryu In, in 1999. Afterward, Kang wrote a memoir of her family life. She died in 2009.

== Writing ==
Kang Sunghee used stylish expressions and concise sentences that stems from her background in English literature. Aside from one of her earlier works, Mwonga dandanhi jalmotdwaetgeodeun, most of her plays handle the conflicts between reality and ideals the characters face with a heavy and serious tone. The conflicts in her biographical plays, such as Pyeheo (폐허 Ruins), Eli eli I soneul (엘리 엘리 이 손을 Eli, Eli, This Hand), Yeomwon (염원 Yearning), and Eodi gasseo, eodi isseo!, can be summed up as challenges that women face in fulling themselves due to the difficulties in reality. This is a projection of her own experience, as Kang herself was unable to start her writing career for a long time despite her studying English literature and her interest in playwriting. Repeatedly portraying women who are conflicted between the love for her family and the ideal life of an artist, Kang not only describes the pressure that family life puts on women but also the effect of historical tragedies, such as the Korean War, on individuals' lives.

The anguish of the modern people whose desire to lead an ideal life is prevented by realistic constraints is an issue that Kang has addressed consistently through her plays. This idea is also prevalent in plays about the lives and choices of historical figures who have left a significant legacy in turbulent Korean history, such as Cheolswae (철쇄 Iron Chain), Myeongryun-dong imnida (명륜동입니다 This is Myeongryun-dong), and Hinkkot maeul. Through Hinkkot maeul, Kang describes an inner conflict that often plagued Korean intellectuals in colonial Korea; through Cheolswa and Ren (렌), she highlighted the contradictions of an era that were particularly harsh to educated women—no matter how people argued that men and women were equal, the institution of family and social biases against women were fetters that prevented women who became aware of their ideals from realizing their dreams. Through Cheolswae, a play about the tragic life of Na Hye-sok, the first female artist in Korea to specialize in Western-style painting, Kang asks why the discrepancy between reality and ideal was particularly harsher on women.

In this way, Kang Sunghee portrayed the inner conflicts of artists, women, and intellectuals in her works that were motivated by her own experiences in modern Korean history and the family institution that was particularly harder on women. One thing of note is that she does not place women and men, members of the pro-Japan faction and independence activists under the dichotomy of good and evil. Both Yi Gwang-su, the model for the protagonist in Huinkkot maeul and Mo Yun-suk, the model for the protagonist in Ren, are censured for their pro-Japanese activities. But instead of judging them, Kang focuses on revealing their inner struggles and conflicts. Likewise, in biographical plays that depict women who have difficulty finding and fulfilling themselves in their families, Kang focuses on portraying the protagonists' inner struggles between the love of their families and the desire to fulfill themselves, instead of exposing the contradictions in the institution of family. As a result, her plays are characterized by emphasis on individuals' inner thoughts that lead to the formation of universal consensus.

In 1993, Kang published Wonhonui sori (원혼의 소리 The Sound of Vengeful Spirits). Released immediately after the results of the Japanese government investigated the issue of Japanese military comfort women, this play lends an ear to the voices of comfort women who had been silenced for a long time. Kang was able to address the issue of comfort women relatively earlier than others because of her artistic world and belief that the cause of the tragic lives and struggles of individuals is based on history and realities.

== Works ==
=== 1. Complete works ===
《강성희 희곡집》(전 5권), 한누리미디어, 1996 / Kang Sunghee huigokjip (five volumes) (The Complete Collection of Plays by Kang Sunghee), Hannuri Media, 1996.

=== 2. Plays ===
《두 얼굴》, 교학사, 1977 / Du eolgul (Two Faces), Kyohaksa, 1977.

《이 세상 크기만한 자유》, 태멘, 1982 I sesang keugimanhan jayu (Freedom as Big as This World), Taemen, 1982.

《흰꽃 마을》, 범문사, 1986 / Huinkkot maeul (White Blossom Village), Beommunsa, 1986.

《영혼의 오후》, 동서문화사, 1991 / Yeonghonui ohu (Afternoon of a Soul), Dong Suh Book, 1991.

《명륜동입니다》, 한국문학도서관, 2000 / Myeongryun-dong imnida (This is Myeongryun-dong), Korean Literature Library, 2000.

《죽음보다 강한 힘》, 답게, 2002 / Jugeumboda ganghan him (A Power Stronger than Death), Dapgae, 2002.

《염원》, 답게, 2003 / Yeomwon (Yearning), Dapgae, 2003.

=== 3. Musical ===
《사랑의 축제》, 동서문화사, 2004 / Sarangui chukje (A Festival of Love), Dong Suk Book, 2004.

=== 4. Memoir ===
《흔적, 그 열정의 비망록》, 동서문화사, 2007 / Heunjeok, ku yeoljeongui bimangnok (Traces: The Memoir of Passion), Dong Suh Book, 2007.

== Awards ==
P.E.N International Literary Award (drama; 1987)

Korean Playwright Association Literary Drama Award (한국희곡작가협회 희곡문학상; 1988)

Korean Literature Award (drama; 1996)

Bogwan Order of Cultural Merit (1998)

National Academy of Arts of the Republic of Korea Award (theater, film, and dance; 2000)

Olbit Award for Women in Theater (drama) (올빛 여성 연극인상, 희곡 부문; 2006)
