= Kim Ransa =

Korean independence activist (1872–1919)

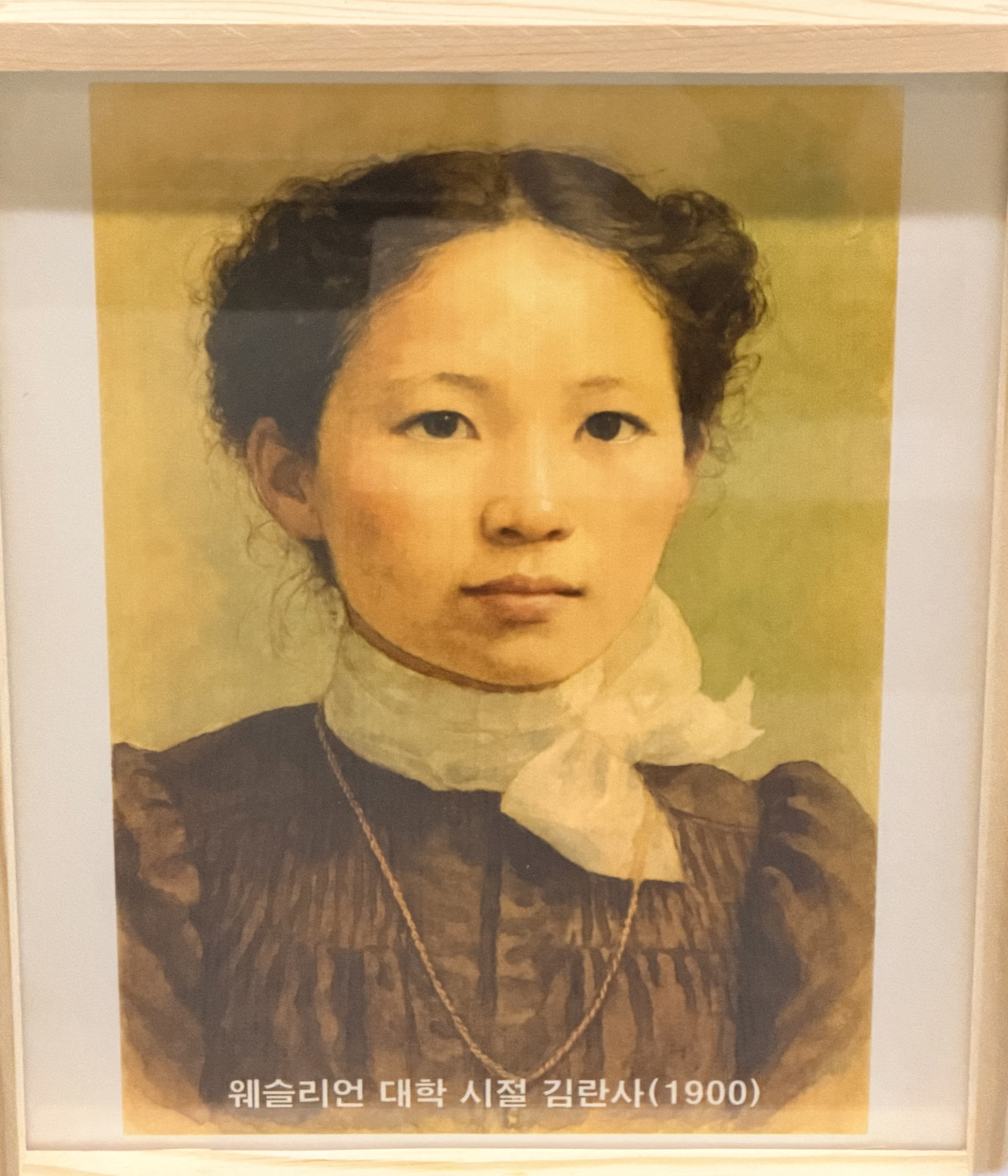
Kim Ransa

Kim Ransa (Korean: 김란사; 1872–1919), also known as Ha Ransa and Nancy Ha, was a Korean independence activist and early advocate for women's rights. She was also a teacher of Yu Gwan-sun, who organized the March First Movement against Japanese rule.

== Early life and education ==
Kim Ransa was born in 1872 in Pyongyang. According to her great-nephew Kim Yong-taek, she was born the eldest of three children of her father, Kim Byeong-hun, and her mother, named only Lee. Her father was a trader, and Kim moved to Seoul to study Chinese classics and help him with his business. In 1911, he moved to Incheon to devote himself to his work.

Kim enjoyed a comfortable life as the daughter of a trader, and married a widower, Ha Sang-gi (1855-1920), whose wife, Lady Jo, had passed away. She married in 1893, at age 21. In 1894, Kim Ransa's convictions about the value of education were strengthened by witnessing the Sino-Japanese War, namely the defeat of Qing dynasty China by Japan. Despite school policy that banned the admission of married women, she successfully persuaded the educators of Ewha Haktang to admit her, and became a student in 1896, at the age of 24. There, she was baptized as "Nancy", which later became 난사 or "Nansa", from the Chinese characters for the name (蘭史).

Shortly after, she studied abroad in Japan for a year at Keio University in Tokyo, before embarking for the United States. She arrived at the port of San Francisco in late 1897, and became known as "Ha Ransa" when an immigration officer asked for her husband's surname upon entry to the U.S. From 1898 onwards, she studied at Howard University and the Training School for Deaconesses in Washington, D.C. for two years. In 1900, she began studying literature at Ohio Wesleyan University; she graduated in 1906 with a Bachelor of Arts degree, becoming the first Korean woman to study abroad and earn a bachelor's degree.

== Return to Korea and teaching career ==
After her graduation, Kim returned to Korea and began teaching English and the Bible at Ewha Haktang in 1907. The Korean government held a welcoming ceremony for the first three women to return from studying abroad: Kim, Esther Park, and Yun Jeong-won. The Hwangseong Sinmun reported on May 5, 1909 that a ceremony was held on April 28 at Gyeonghuigung Palace honor their dedication to women's education and life. At the palace, Emperor Gojong personally awarded them silver medals.

She also became an advisor for a student-led organization called the Ewha Literary Society (Imunhoe) which would play a pivotal role in guiding Yu Gwan-sun to lead a peaceful demonstration with other female students. Kim encouraged Yu Gwan-sun to become "a light for Korea," and join the organization. Kim became the only Korean professor to join the first women's college at Ewha Haktang when it was established in 1910. After serving as a teacher and dormitory supervisor, she eventually served as the vice principal.

== Independence advocacy ==
Kim fostered a strong relationship with the Korean royal family, including Gojong, the last king of Joseon and the first Emperor of Korea, and his son Prince Ui, with whom she had studied at Ohio Wesleyan University. Kim served as an interpreter for Gojong and a key emissary in the Korean independence movement.

In 1919, Gojong and Kim made plans to send delegates, including Kim and Prince Ui, to the Paris Peace Conference seeking foreign support for Korean independence. The attempt was initially abandoned after the sudden death of Gojong on January 21, 1919.

== Death ==
In April 1919, after being dispatched as the Korean representative to the Paris Peace Conference, Kim fell ill at a banquet for Korean residents in Beijing, China, and died suddenly at the age of 47. There was witness testimony that Kim's corpse turned black, potentially due to poisoning, but the official cause of death remains unknown. Many controversial theories have circulated, including that she was poisoned by the Japanese.

== Legacy ==
Kim is known for her advocacy of women's empowerment through education. In response to a piece written by Yun Ch'iho in the journal The Korea Mission Field in July 1911, detailing the need for Korean women to learn how to do household chores, Kim published a rebuttal piece asserting that "the purpose of education for women is not to cook or sew better," and that "women students should not be blamed, with a lack of evidence, for not knowing how to do laundry nor ironing.

In 1995, Kim was posthumously awarded with the Order of Merit for National Foundation.

In 2021, Korean novelist Kwon Bee-young published the novel "Haransa" (Korean: 하란사) about Kim's life. In 2024, British journalist Daniel Tudor published a historical novel entitled "The Last Prince", dedicated to Yi Kang (Prince Ui), but which also highlighted Kim's place in the Korean independence movement. Tudor described Kim as "unfairly forgotten in history", and stated that he made her a character in the novel so her name "won't be forgotten".
