= Esther Park =

Esther Park may refer to:

- Esther Park, Kempton Park, a suburb of Kempton Park, Gauteng province, South Africa
- Esther Park (physician), Korean physician
- Esther Park (Melbourne)
