= Gangil-dong =

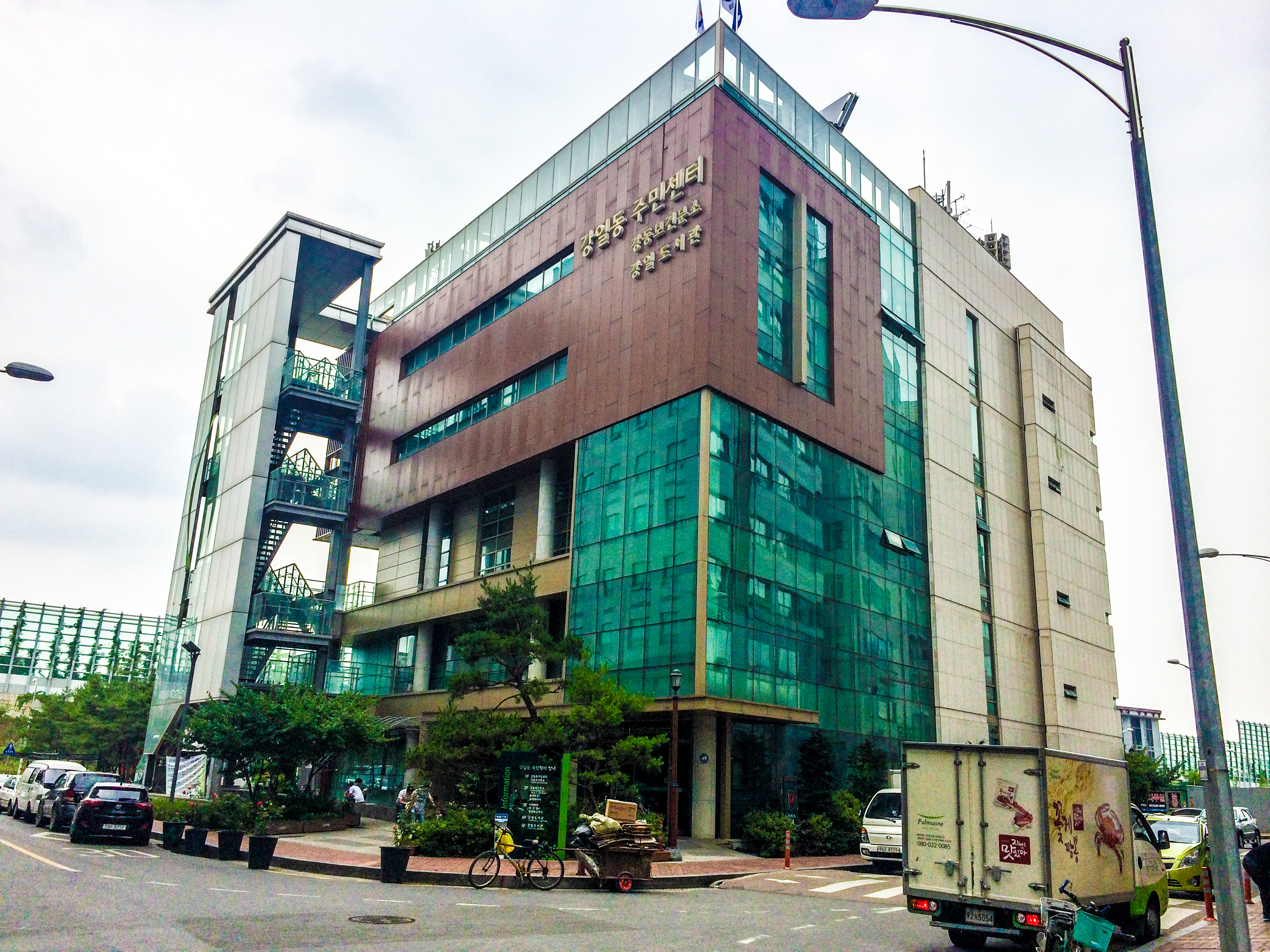
- Gangil-dong Community Service Center

- Location within Seoul Location within South Korea
- Country: South Korea

Area
  - Total: 2.80 km^{2} (1.08 sq mi)

Population (2001)
  - Total: 5,350
  - Density: 1,911/km^{2} (4,950/sq mi)

Korean name
- Hangul: 강일동
- Hanja: 江一洞
- RR: Gangil-dong
- MR: Kangil-tong

Gangil-dong (Korean: 강일동) is a dong (neighborhood) of Gangdong District, Seoul, South Korea.

Gangil-dong is located on the easternmost side of Seoul. Originally a small farming village where development was prohibited due to its location at Seoul's greenbelt, the city's new developments projects in the 21st century lead to a complete transformation of this neighborhood. It is now home to the Gangil River Park multi-rise apartment complexes with a view into the Han River, the Gangil High-Tech Business Center, a brand new library and a new four-lane bridge connecting it to Sangil-dong.

== See also ==
- Administrative divisions of South Korea
