= Jeong-dong =

Neighborhood in Seoul, South Korea

- Deoksugung Doldam-gil
- Interactive map of Jeong-dong
- Country: South Korea

Area
  - Total: 0.30 km^{2} (0.12 sq mi)

Korean name
- Hangul: 정동
- Hanja: 貞洞
- RR: Jeong-dong
- MR: Chŏng-dong

Jeong-dong (Korean: 정동) is a legal dong (neighbourhood) of Jung District, Seoul, South Korea. It is governed by its administrative dong, Sogong-dong.

It is an historical area with Deoksugung from the Joseon period and some of Korea's first modern schools and churches. It also home to contemporary museums, galleries and theaters along tree-lined streets and cobblestone alleyways.

== Festival ==
- Jeong-dong Culture Night - It is the place where modern Western culture first took root, including Deoksugung Palace where the king stayed during the Joseon period. Ewha School, Baejae School, Chungdong First Methodist Church etc. have been around for more than 100 years to tell the vivid history of Jeong-dong. Jeong-dong Culture Night offers various cultural experiences for domestic and international visitors. Programs such as Eoga Parade, military music parade, concerts, story-telling, busking and film exhibitions will be held in connection with the Seoul Metropolitan Government.

== Attractions ==
- Deoksugung
- Doldam-gil (or Stonewall Road)
- Chungdong First Methodist Church – the oldest extant church in Korea

== Canadian Diplomatic Complex ==
Jeong-dong is home to Canadian embassy in South Korea. Opened in 2007 and designed by Zeidler Architecture replacing the first permanent mission from 1974. Located a short distance on the same street are the diplomatic missions of the Netherlands and New Zealand.

== Education ==
Schools located in Jeong-dong:

- Yewon School
- Changdeok Girls' Middle School
- Ewha Girls' High School

== See also ==
- Administrative divisions of South Korea
