= Na Hyesŏk =

Korean feminist (1896–1948)

Na Hye-sŏk
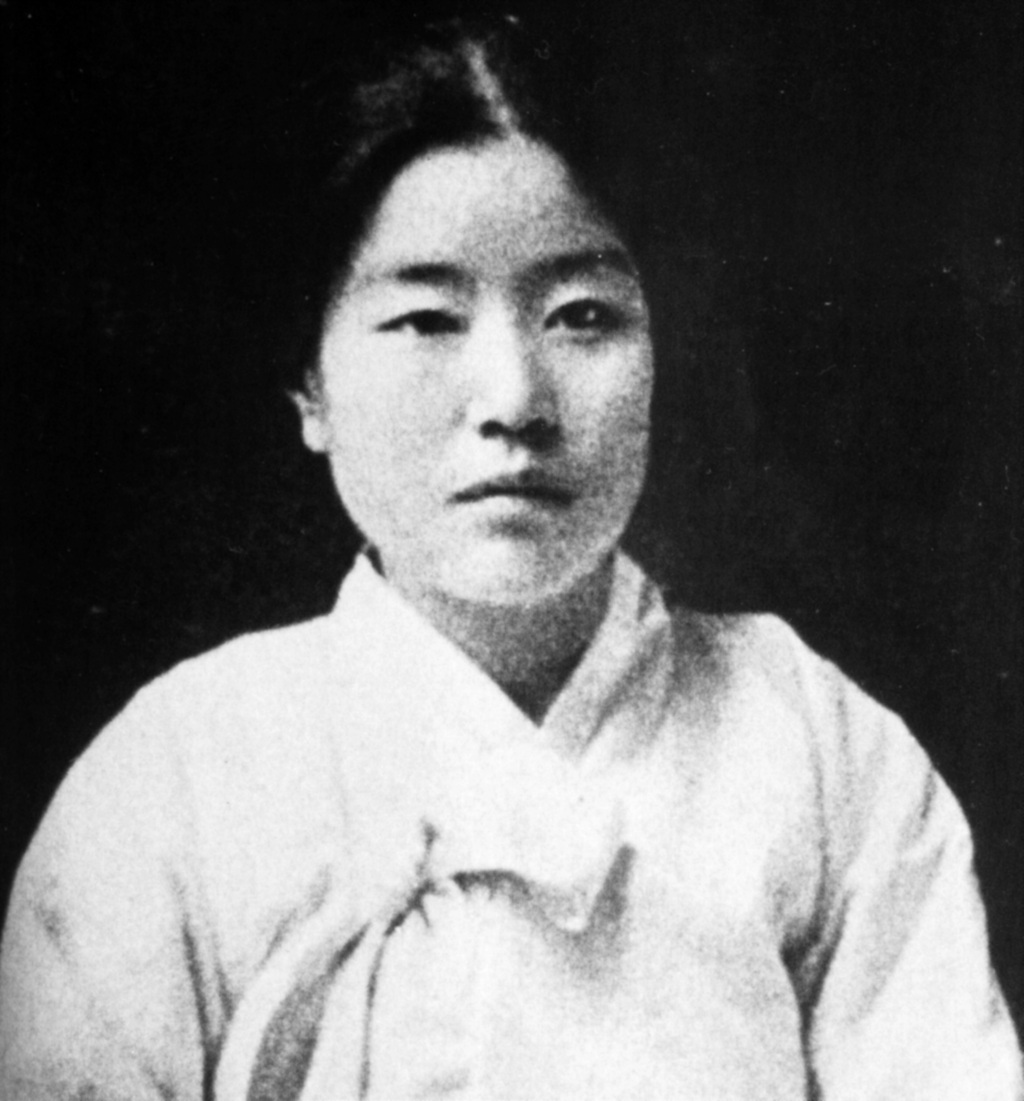
- Na, aged 18–19 (c.1915)
- Born: April 28, 1896; Shinpyeong-ri, Suwon-myeon, Suwon County, Incheon-bu, Joseon now Haenggung-dong, Suwon, South Korea
- Died: December 10, 1948 (aged 52); Wonhyoro il-dong, Yongsan District, Seoul, South Korea
- Occupations: Poet, journalist, writer, painter
- Spouse: Kim Woo-yeong (m. 1920; div. 1930)
- Writing career
- Period: 1896–1948
- Genres: Poetry, Novel, Art, Painting, Essay, Drama

Korean name
- Hangul: 나혜석
- Hanja: 羅蕙錫
- RR: Na Hyeseok
- MR: Na Hyesŏk

Art name
- Hangul: 정월
- Hanja: 晶月
- RR: Jeongwol
- MR: Chŏngwŏl

Na Hye-sŏk (Korean: 나혜석, April 28, 1896 – December 10, 1948) was a Korean feminist, poet, writer, painter, educator, and journalist. Her art name was Jeongwol (정월; 晶月). She was a pioneering Korean feminist writer and painter. She was the first female professional painter and the first feminist writer in Korea. She created some of the earliest Western-style paintings in Korea, and published feminist novels and short stories. She became well known as a feminist because of her criticism of the marital institution in the early 20th century.

== Early life ==
Na Hye-sŏk was born on April 28, 1896, in Suwon, Joseon. She was the fourth child of father Na Gi-jeong and mother Choi Si-ui, and a member of the aristocratic Naju Na clan. Na demonstrated her artistic talent from an early age and graduated at the top of her class at Jinmyeong Girls' High School in 1913.

== Career ==
As a young woman, Na was known for her high spirits and outspokenness, making it clear she wanted to be a painter and an intellectual, rejecting the traditional "Good Wife, Wise Mother" archetype. Her major written work, Kyonghui (경희), published in 1918, concerns a woman's self-discovery and her subsequent search for meaning in life as a "new woman."

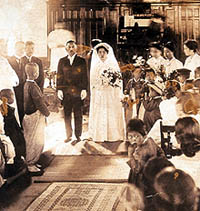
Marriage of Na Hye-sŏk and Kim Woo-young (1920)

After her graduation from Jinmyeong Girls' High School in 1913, Na majored in Western oil painting at Tokyo Arts College for Women. As a student, Na wrote several essays critiquing the standard "good wife, wise mother" Korean archetype, saying she wanted a career as an artist. In April 1915, Na became the main organizer of the Association of Korean Women Students in Japan. It was around this time that she fell in love with Choe Sung-gu, a student at Keio University and the then editor and publisher of the magazine Hakchigwang. The relationship between Na and Choe was highly publicized among Korean students in Japan, as was Na's close literary and personal association with Yi Gwangsu. In the spring of 1915, Na's father summoned her back home and pressured her to accept a marriage proposal from a well-established family. Na was able to escape this by accepting a teaching position in a primary school, according to her later account. After a year of teaching and saving money for tuition, Na returned to Tokyo toward the end of 1915 to resume her studies. In April 1916, however, Choe Sung-gu died of tuberculosis, and Na had to temporarily stop her studies while recovering from a mental breakdown.

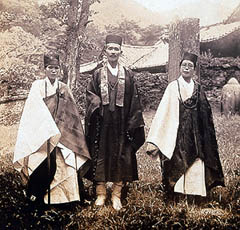
In a monastery on Inwangsan Mountain (1944)

In 1919, she participated in the March 1st Movement against Japanese rule. She was jailed for this.

In 1920 Na, along with Kim Iryeop and ten men, contributed to the coterie literary magazine Pyeho. Early in the 1920s, both Kim and Na contributed a series of articles to the first magazine for Korean women, called Sinyoja, or "New Woman", on the subject of improving Korean women's clothing. They argued for a more functional and practical outfit for Korean women to help improve their hygiene, health, and self-image, and denounced traditional Korean dresses which were designed with no consideration for women's physical comfort, protection, and convenience.

On April 10, 1920, Na married Kim Woo-young (1886–1958) in Jeongdong Wedding Hall, Seoul. He was a graduate of Kyoto Imperial University who worked as a lawyer before becoming a diplomat for the Japanese Ministry of Foreign Affairs. On March 18, 1921, Na had her first exhibition of paintings and the first exhibition by a Korean woman painter in Seoul. In 1923, Na attracted much attention for her essay "Thoughts on becoming a mother," in which she criticized her husband for leaving child-rearing entirely up to her.

In 1926, Na continued her habit of writing about topics unconventional for her time when she contributed articles to the Chosun Ilbo under the title "While creating an art exhibition entry". In them, she described her attitude towards painting, specifically remarking how uterine inflammation made it more difficult for her to paint, so that from winter to spring she was unable to draw "more than a couple of pages".

In 1927 Na and her husband embarked on a tour of Europe and America lasting a year and a half, with the sponsorship of the Japanese government. They first visited Paris, France and then the American cities New York, Chicago, and San Francisco. In 1928, Na stayed for three months in the Le Vésinet suburb of Paris at the home of Félicien Challaye, an anti-colonialist who supported the Korean independence movement. While there, she studied at the Académie Ranson under the artist Roger Bissière. While in Paris, with her husband away, she is said to have engaged in an affair with Cheondo-gyo leader Choi Rin, which became fodder for gossip columnists. Na's husband divorced her on grounds of infidelity in 1931.

Following her return from abroad, and despite the divorce and disgraceful reputation, Na continued her art career. She held an exhibition in her home town of Suwon in which she displayed both the art that she completed in Europe as well as prints she had acquired throughout her travels.

Na won a special prize at the 10th Joseon Art Exhibition in 1931. She also published a piece called A Divorce Testimony in the magazine Samcheolli in 1934, raising issues with gender inequality endorsed by Korean morality and tradition. She challenged the patriarchal social system and male-oriented mentality of Korean society at the time. In A Divorce Testimony, Na criticized the repression of female sexuality; stated that her ex-husband had been unable to satisfy her sexually and refused to discuss the issue; finally she advocated for "test marriages" where a couple would live together before marrying to avoid a repeat of her unhappy marriage. It was A Divorce Testimony that ultimately ruined Na's career, as her views were regarded as scandalous and shocking, since traditional Korean Confucian culture considered premarital sex to be taboo and women were not to speak frankly of their sexuality.

She died of malnutrition on December 10, 1948, at a charity hospital, with no one to claim her remains. News of her death was not published in any major newspapers. She has recently been acknowledged in Korea for her artistic and literary accomplishments. For example, Seoul Arts Center opened a retrospective exhibition of her works in 2000.

== Artistic style ==
Art historian Sunglim Kim writes how in 1926, Na Hye-sŏk described her painting style as "influenced by her Japanese professors." This resulted in a "Post-Impressionist and Naturalist style" which emphasized form, color, and lighting. In order to bring more personal differentiation to her work, Na's style underwent a shift from brighter, prominent colors to ones that were less vibrant. Other characteristics of Na's personal style include: a "specialty in landscape"; "bold, confident, and spontaneous brushstrokes", and experimentation with texture, exemplified in South Gate of Bonghwan Fortress (1923). An additional description of her work by Sunglim Kim explains that her environment had a clear influence on the depictions in her work, stating, “Because she went out to sketch for her landscapes and gave deep thought to composition, her presentation of architectural structure and her compositions are well considered and solid.”

During this period, Na participated in many exhibitions, displaying and selling her work, some of which sold for as much as 350 won (US $3,500 today). Na's first solo exhibition, which included a collection of oil paintings, was promoted in a newspaper article Kyonsong Ilbo. Na also submitted paintings almost yearly to the state-sponsored Joseon Art Exhibition.

Many of her paintings were accepted into the Joseon Art Exhibition. Two of her paintings, Garden in Fall and Nangrang Tomb, won fourth and third place, respectively. Additionally, two of her paintings, Ch'onhung (Tianhou Temple) and Garden received the "...highest award in Western oil painting…" in 1926 and 1931, respectively.

In the 1930s, Na received criticism of her work as well as of her personal life after her affair became known to the public. As a result, she moved to submitting works to a Japanese art exhibition, Teiten, as well as requesting help in selling her work. This was not enough, however, and she no longer submitted work to public exhibitions. These issues all took their toll on Na, which was attributed to another shift in her artistic style, "with loose structure and rough hasty brushstrokes" exemplified in Peonies in Front of Hwanyong Hall (1933) and Hongnyu Waterfall (1937).

== Artwork ==
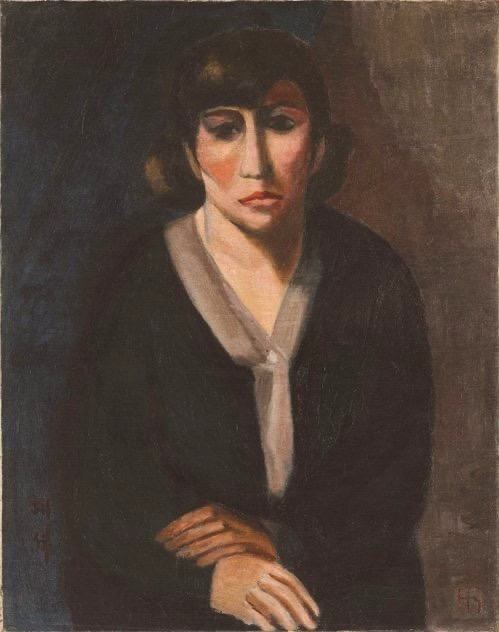
Self-Portrait (ca. 1928)

Although Na is remembered primarily for her literary work on early feminism, she has also impacted modern Korean art through several known pieces that reflect both her beliefs on gender roles as well as her life's trajectory. The most famous of these works is her Self-Portrait (자화상), c. 1928. It is difficult to find any likeness to Korean or female conformity in Na's self-portrait. In this oil painting, she emphasizes her identity as a modern, educated, independent woman by wearing modern clothing instead of a traditional Korean hanbok, which was at the time worn as everyday clothing in Korea. Additionally, her hairstyle is also modernized; her hair in the painting has been "styled" into soft waves with two buns in the back, which was a popular feminine hairstyle in the West in the 1920s. Her make-up is also more westernized, with harsh contour, heavy blush, the shape of the eyebrow is arched and shaded darkly with a dark brown to black coloring.

The dark palette of the background blends with Na's hair and dress to create a flat surface for her face to stand out, drawing viewers' eyes to her expression. The carved and partially shadowed face, the dark, deep eyes, and the slightly pressed and pursed mouth convey weariness and agony. In addition to these qualities, her large eyes and high nose bridge are reminiscent of western features. The influence of Cubism is clear in the prominent Westernized facial bone structure of the subject; this could imply a preferred appearance or a wish to understand the Western woman's experience of living in a more progressive society. Despite the fact that she looks both western and modern in terms of appearance and attire, the darkness in this painting's coloring (black, silver, brown, peach) shows how she was still stuck within a society where conservative ideas were holding women back from achieving real and significant social changes.

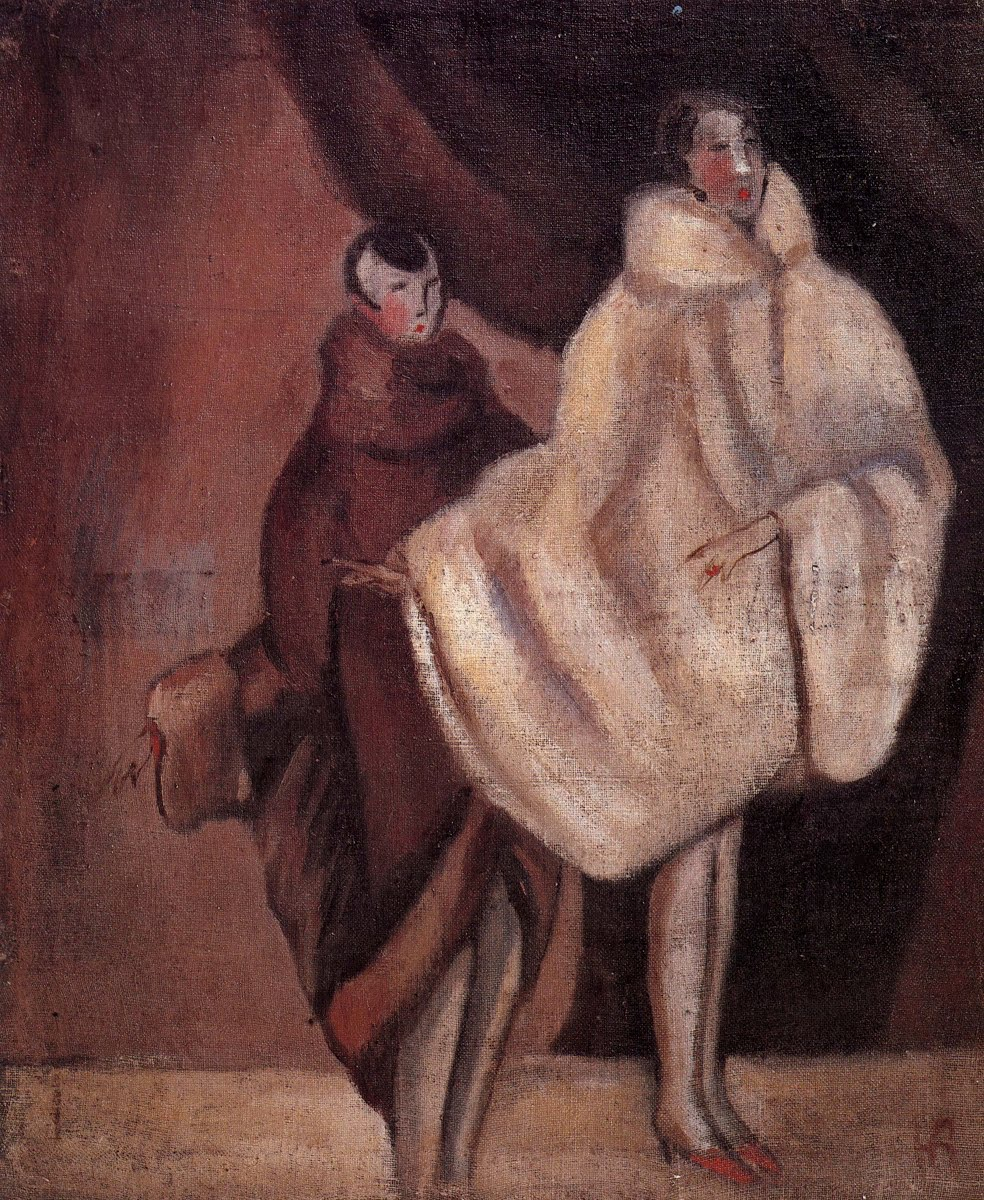
Dancers (ca. 1927-1928)

The depressing look she dons in the painting indicates the hardship of living as a New Woman in a patriarchal and complicated society of early 20th century Korea; her firm, straight gaze points to her conviction in her ideals. She is also gazing somewhere else rather than directly at the viewer, which could represent how the freedom and fluidity in gender roles she was seeking was unable to be found in the conservative society she was living in.

In 2000, Seoul Arts Center opened a retrospective exhibition of her works, and in 2022, The Los Angeles County Museum of Art (LACMA) displayed this self-portrait as part of its Korean contemporary art exhibition, titled “The Space Between: The Modern in Korean Art." BTS's RM introduced it along with the nine other pieces through an audio message spoken in both English and Korean, a testament to how influential and respected Na is nowadays for her art.

A similar painting by Na is titled Dancers (c. 1927 – 1928) and depicts two apparently western women wearing brown and white fur coats. It is clear that the two women are western or at least meant to portray western women based on their facial features, which are drawn in a similar way to the features that appear on her own self-portrait (e.g. high nose bridges and heavy makeup). This painting evokes an image of luxury and sophistication through the way the women are elegantly posed, indicating that it is unlikely that the fur coats were worn solely out of necessity for the frosty weather. The title of the painting Dancers also adds to this imagery, suggesting that this attire is meant for aesthetic purposes instead. The presentation of the women is associated with Western society and modernity, and this influence from the West is present throughout most of her paintings. The darker color scheme she uses in this painting is similar to that of Self-Portrait (i.e. brown tones) and is used in much of her other work as well, reflecting both the tragic life she lived as well as her mental state at the time.

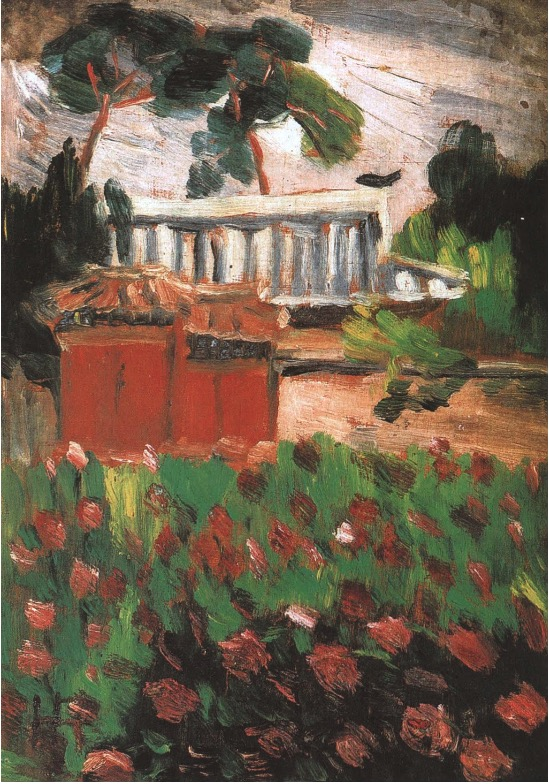
Peonies at Hwaryeongjeon (1935)

Another work of art Na is attributed with is the painting Peonies at Hwaryeongjeon (화령전 작약). Na's range of topics for her paintings is vast, and these topics range from farm life, nudes, and satires to different types of scenery. This painting was created after she released A Divorce Confession (otherwise known as A Divorce Testimony) in 1934, her extremely controversial piece of writing that criticized gender roles as well as her husband's behavior in their marriage. Although both Na and her husband committed faults in their relationship, Na lost more than her husband and eventually became a social outcast after releasing this work. This painting was made just a year after this incident, reflecting her hope to be free from social restrictions. Na uses the impasto painting technique in this work, which is a style in which visible brushstrokes of thick paint are used to create clear paint streaks on top of the canvas. By doing so, she is able to capture the fleeting moments when the wind blows the peonies to a blur in the foreground. The texture and the appearance of movement in the painting evoke a realistic experience of a windy excursion and the vibrant colors (orange, green, yellow, and white) make the painting appear animated and lively. Both of these qualities are symbolic of the freedom Na seeks as a woman in 20th-century conservative Korean society.

More recently, another landscape painting created by Na has been unveiled. The drawing was found at her nephew Na Sanggyun's house in Buam-dong, northern Seoul. According to Na Sanggyun, the painting had belonged to the granddaughter of Choi Nam-seon, a renowned writer during the Japanese colonial period. Choi Namseon and Na had been acquaintances ever since they studied together in Japan. She gave the drawing to him, and it had been preserved through three generations.

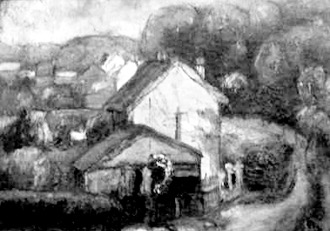
Na's Paris Landscape Piece

The drawing is estimated to have been made in 1928 during Na's stay in Paris as part of her 21-month trip around the world with her husband. The painting is 60 centimeters long (24 inches) and 50 centimeters wide and depicts a typical landscape painting of a French village with surrounding trees and a red-roofed house with white walls. The bold brush strokes in the work simplify the object while also bringing it to life, and elements of Fauvism and expressionism can also be found in it.

The artwork was recognized by Kim Yi-sun, a professor of Korean modern art at Hongik University, to be from Na's collection book. The piece was confirmed to be hers due to a signature 'HR' found on it that she used regularly in her works as a form of identification.

Some other paintings potentially created by Na during her stay in Europe include Harbor in Spain and Beach in Spain. These pieces differ from Na's Paris landscape painting through the colorful presentation of the scenes depicted, with the varied use of bright colors such as green, orange, brown, blue, and white in the fluid strokes that outline the details of the scenes. Interestingly, Na's Scene of Paris (1927-1928), also created during this time, uses more subdued colors (e.g. brown and grayish tones) that appear to make the scene more depressing and dark. This artistic choice establishes a mood more closely related to that of her Paris landscape painting, which may suggest that Na viewed her time in France differently in comparison to the time she spent in the other European nations, possibly due to her affair in Paris with Choi Rin at the time.

== List of works ==
- Divorce Testimony (이혼고백서, 離婚告白書)
- Kyonghui (경희)
- Na Hyeseok jeonjip (나혜석전집, 羅蕙錫全集)
- Na Hyeseok's Collected Works (나혜석 작품집)
- Self-Portrait (자화상), ca. 1928
- Peonies at Hwaryeongjeon (화령전 작약)
- Paris Landscape
- Dancers (c. 1927 – 1928)
- Harbor in Spain
- Beach in Spain
- Scene of Paris (1927–1928)

== Works in translation ==
- "Kyonghui" in Questioning Minds: Short Stories By Modern Korean Writers (p. 24)

== Legacy ==
Na's short story Kyonghui (경희, 1918) is regarded as a work that exemplifies her distinct originality and femininity. The work was a confessionary novel, and anticipated a trend of novels of the 1920s to 1930s. Similar novels by writers such as Yeom Sang-seop, Kim Dong-in, Kim Iryeop, and Kim Myeong-sun also challenged sexual taboos rooted in the traditional patriarchal family system.

A Google Doodle on April 28, 2019, commemorated the 123rd anniversary of Na’s birth.

== See also ==
- Park Indeok
- Kim Hwallan

== Sources ==
1. Kim, Sunglim (2018). "The Personal is Political: The Life and Death and Life of Na Hye-sok(1896-1948)", In Gender, Continuity, and Modernity in Shaping the Arts of East Asia, 16th-20th centuries. Leiden/Boston: BRILL. p. 257-269. ISBN 978-90-04-34894-3
2. Hwang, Kyung Moon. “NA HYE-SEOK.” In Past Forward: Essays in Korean History, 137–139. Anthem Press, 2019. doi:10.2307/j.ctvb1hts4.54
3. Kim, Yung-Hee. “In Quest of Modern Womanhood: Sinyŏja, A Feminist Journal in Colonial Korea.” Korean Studies 37 (2013): 44–78. JSTOR 24575276
