= Esther Park (physician) =

Korean physician (c. 1876–1910)

Esther Kim Pak
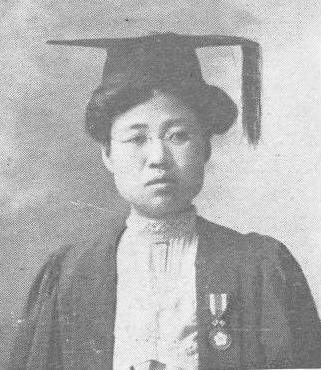
- Esther Kim Pak in academic regalia, from a memorial brochure published about 1910.
- Born: Kim Jeom-dong; March 16, 1876; Seoul, Joseon
- Died: April 13, 1910 (aged 34)
- Other names: Kim, Cheom-dong, Ester Kim Pak
- Occupations: medical doctor, missionary
- Years active: 1895–1910
- Spouse(s): Park, Yeo-seon

Korean name
- Hangul: 에스더 박
- RR: Eseudeo Bak
- MR: Esŭdŏ Pak

Former name
- Hangul: 김점동
- Hanja: 金點童
- RR: Gim Jeomdong
- MR: Kim Chŏmdong

Esther Park (Korean: 에스더 박), born Kim Jeom-dong (Korean: 김점동; Hanja: 金點童; March 16, 1876 or 1877 – April 13, 1910), was a Korean physician; she was the first Korean woman to practice Western medicine in the country.

== Early life ==
Kim Jeom-dong was born on March 16, 1876 (or, according to other sources - March 16, 1877 or 1879) in the Seoul district of Jeong-dong, she was the third of four daughters. Kim's father worked for American missionary Henry Appenzeller. In 1886, he sent his daughter to study at the Ewha Girls' School founded by Mary F. Scranton. Kim's parents allowed her to study under two conditions: she was forbidden to go to the United States, and to leave school prior to marriage.

Kim was a good student, particularly good at English. When American missionary doctor Rosetta Sherwood Hall visited the school, Kim was asked to work as her interpreter. Impressed by doctor Hall's surgery to correct a cleft lip and cleft palate, Kim began to dream of a medical career. Rosetta Hall convinced Kim that Koreans were afflicted by Confucian prohibitions that did not allow them to be properly treated.

== Study and career ==
Rosetta Sherwood Hall introduced Kim to Pak Yusan (박여선; 朴汝先), who worked with her husband, and on May 24, 1893, Kim Jeom-dong married him at the first Western-style wedding ceremony between Koreans in Korea. After the wedding, she took the name of Esther Pak, adding her husband's name to the name under which she was baptized. In 1894, Sherwood Hall returned to New York, taking Esther and Yusan with her.

Esther Pak graduated from a one-year school in New York where she studied Latin, physics and mathematics. In 1900, Park graduated from the Women's Medical College of Baltimore, as the first Korean woman to earn a medical degree in the United States. Her husband supported Pak's medical education, but he died from tuberculosis, half a year before her graduation.

After obtaining her degree, Pak returned to Korea and settled in the first female hospital in the country, Bogu-yogwan (Korean: 보구 여관; Hanja: 普救女館), in Jeongdon, Seoul. For ten months of work there, Dr. Pak helped more than 3,000 patients, and then in 1901 moved to Pyongyang, where Dr. Hall established a new hospital. Pak traveled all around Korea, including during the cholera epidemic, helping patients free of charge. In addition to the main work, she also conducted educational and teaching activities, teaching the first generation of Korean female doctors. Pak led public lectures in which she emphasized the importance of health education and education for women, and promoted Christianity.

Esther Pak died of tuberculosis in April 1910, at the age of 34 years.

== Honors ==
On April 28, 1909, Esther Pak and two other Korean women pioneers were celebrated with a ceremony: Ha Ran-sa, the first woman bachelor in Literature from an American university, and Yun Jeong-won, the first Korean graduate of the Japanese Meiji University (Music); it was attended by 7800 people. Emperor Gojong presented Pak with a silver medal.

Pak was one of the historical figures featured in a missionary pageant titled "A Cloud of Witnesses" by Dora Patterson, performed in Hazleton, Pennsylvania in 1933.

In 2006, the Korean Academy of Sciences inducted Esther Park to the Korean Science and Technology Hall of Fame.

In 2008, the Ewha University Alumni Committee established the Esther Park Medal, which recognizes the merit of women who graduated from the university and became doctors.
