= Sangil-dong =

- Interactive map of Sangil-dong
- Country: South Korea

Area
  - Total: 2.65 km^{2} (1.02 sq mi)

Population (2001)
  - Total: 33,530
  - Density: 12,653/km^{2} (32,770/sq mi)

Korean name
- Hangul: 상일동
- Hanja: 上一洞
- RR: Sangil-dong
- MR: Sangil-tong

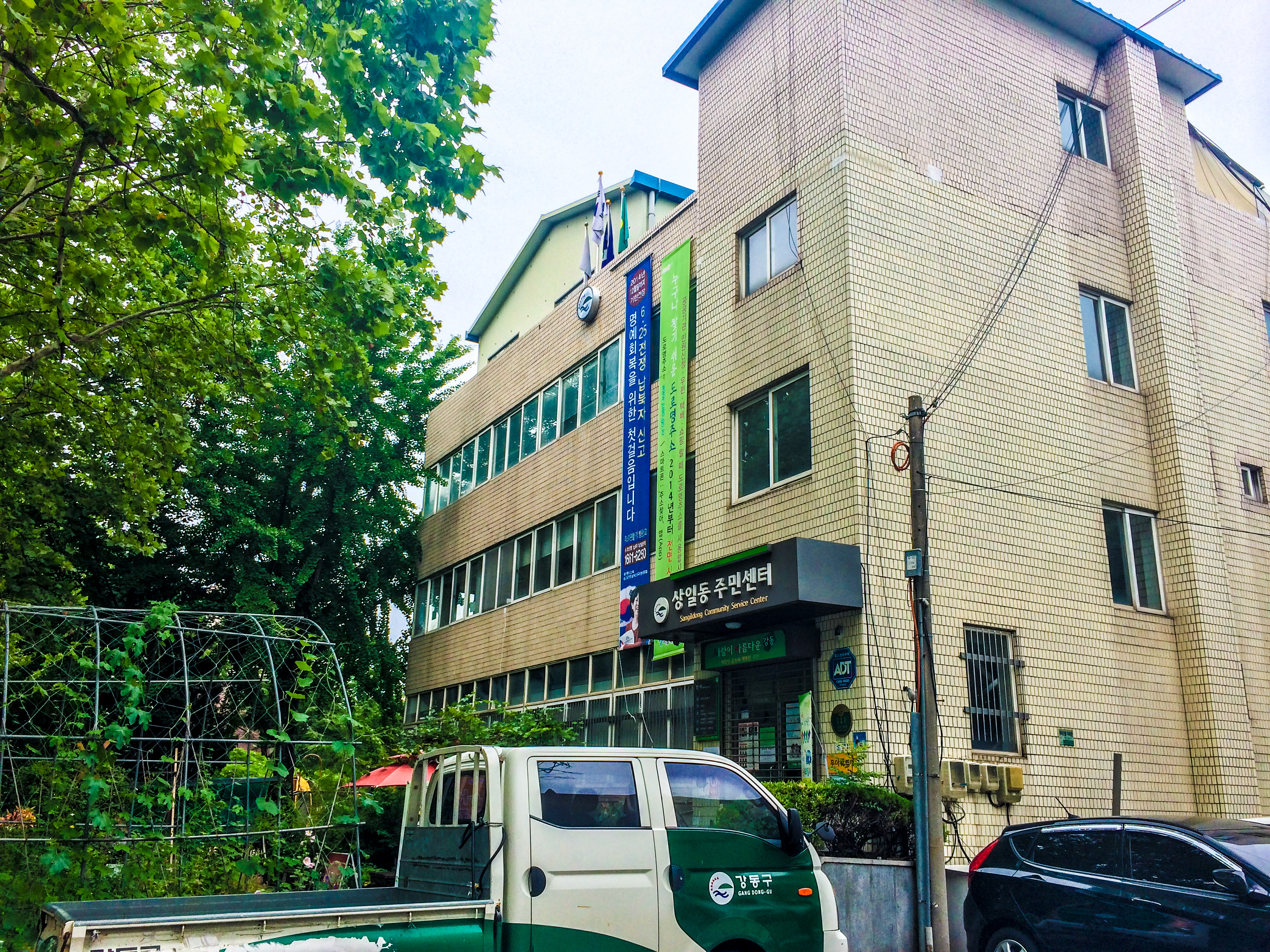
Sangil-dong Community Service Center

Sangil-dong (Korean: 상일동) is a dong (neighbourhood) of Gangdong District, Seoul, South Korea.

== History ==
Sangil-dong literally means 'Upper Part' and located geographically higher than Hail-dong(Currently Gangil-dong) where the stream of Genae flows. In 1963, Sangil-dong became a part of Seoul. Until the early 1980s, huge apartments complex named Godeok Jugong Apartments were built by Korea National Housing Corporation (currently Korea Land & Housing Corporation). Sangil-dong Station is the eastern terminus of Seoul Subway Line 5 and also location for Hanyoung Foreign Language High School. Nayeon from Twice was born in Sangil-dong.

== Area information ==
The current postal code of Sangil-dong is 134-090. 134 is for Gangdong District and 090 is for Sangil-dong.

== Offices and Buildings ==
Samsung Engineering has built new headquarters here. Construction began in September 2009. The complex is composed of three buildings and spans an area of more than 27,000 square meters, making it the fifth-biggest corporate estate in the Seoul area.

== See also ==
- Administrative divisions of Gangdong District
- Administrative divisions of Seoul
- Administrative divisions of South Korea
