= William D. Reynolds =

American missionary in Korea (1867–1951)

William Davis Reynolds
- Reynolds in 1920.
- Born: November 12, 1867; Norfolk, Virginia, U.S.
- Died: 1951 (aged 83–84); North Carolina, U.S.
- Other names: Korean: 이눌서; Hanja: 李訥瑞
- Education: Hampden-Sydney College, Johns Hopkins University, Union Presbyterian Seminary
- Spouse: Patsy Bolling Reynolds
- Children: Carey Mebane Reynolds Wilson
- Church: American Southern Presbyterian

William D. Reynolds (Korean: 이눌서; Hanja: 李訥瑞, 1867–1951) was an American Southern Presbyterian (PCUS) missionary and Bible translator in Korea.

William Davis Reynolds was born 12 November 1867. He received his undergraduate education at Hampden-Sydney College in Virginia and subsequently studied theology at Union Presbyterian Seminary. In 1891 he attended the Inter-Seminary Alliance for Foreign Missions and heard a talk by Horace Grant Underwood who was furlough from a medical missionary scheme in Seoul; Reynolds was inspired by the talk and applied to the PCUS Executive Committee of Foreign Missions to go to Korea as a missionary.

He and his wife Patsy were living in Korea by 1904. They wrote several magazine articles during their time there. He took the name of ‘Lee Nulseo’ while in Korea.

He completed the first translation of the Old Testament into Korean in 1910.

Along with Horace G. Underwood, James Scarth Gale, Henry G. Appenzeller, William B. Scranton, Lee Seung Doo (이승두), and Kim Jeong Sam (김정삼), Reynolds and the team's efforts led to the first Korean translation of the New Testament and the first Korean Hymnal.

From 1917-1937 he was professor in Systematic Theology and Biblical Languages at Pyongyang Presbyterian Theological Seminary. He was known for teaching a conservative and fundamentalist version of theology.
