= Kim Iryeop =

South Korean writer (1896–1971)

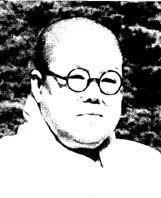
- Kim Iryeop c. 1935
- Born: 28 April 1896; Yonggang, Joseon
- Died: 1 February 1971 (aged 74); Sudeoksa, South Korea
- Occupations: Poet, journalist, writer, painter, feminist activist, bhikṣuṇī
- Spouse(s): Yi Noik (1919–1921, divorced); Ha Yunshil (1929–1930, divorced)
- Writing career
- Period: 1896–1971
- Genres: Buddhist philosophy, women's rights, New Women (신여성), poetry, novel, essay, drama

Kim Iryeop (Korean: 김일엽; Hanja: 金一葉; 28 April 1896 – 28 May 1971), also spelled Kim Iryŏp, was a South Korean writer, journalist, feminist activist, and Buddhist nun. Her given name was Kim Wonju (김원주; 金元周). Her courtesy and dharma name was Iryeop.

== Biography ==
Kim Iryeop was born to a Methodist pastor and his wife in a northern part of the Korean Empire and became a modern literary, Buddhist and feminist thinker and activist.

Kim Iryŏp (1896–1971) was raised and initially educated in a devout Methodist Christian environment under the strict guidance of her fideistic pastor father and her mother who believed in female education. Both parents died while she was in her teens and she questioned her Christian faith at an early age. She was one of the first Korean women to pursue a higher education in Korea and Japan. Kim became a prolific poet and essayist, her writings engaging cultural and social issues, and a leading figure of the feminist “new woman” (sinyŏja) movement in the 1920s that promoted women’s self-awareness, freedom (including sexual freedom), and rights in the context of the complex intersection of traditional Korean Confucian society, Westernization and modernization, and Japanese colonial domination.

— Eric S. Nelson, "Kim Iryŏp’s Existential Buddhism"

Having completed her primary education after the death of her parents, she moved to Seoul to attend Ehwa Hakdang (1913–1915), which later became Ewha Girls' High School. In 1915 she moved on to Ewha Hakdang (now Ewha Womans University). She completed her education at Ewha in 1918 and married a professor of Yeonheui Junior College.

In 1919, Iryeop went to Japan to continue her studies and returned to Korea in 1920. Upon returning, she launched a journal, New Woman (신여자; 新女子), which is credited to be the first women's journal in Korea that was published by women for the promotion of women's issues.

Iryeop influenced the Korean literary society of her time by writing about activities that reflected trends in the women's liberation movement and this was her impetus for her founding New Woman. Over the years, a great number of her critical essays, poems and short novels about women's liberation struggling against the oppressive traditions of the period of Korea under Japanese rule were published in such Korean-language daily newspapers as The Dong-a Ilbo and The Chosun Ilbo, as well as in literary magazines including Kaebyeok and Chosun Mundan (Korea Literary World).

Iryeop ordained as a Buddhist nun in 1933 and moved into Sudeoksa in 1935, where she lived until she died.

== Works ==
=== Books ===
- Reflections of a Zen Buddhist Nun (어느 수도인의 회상, 1960)
- Having Burned Away My Youth (청춘을 불사르고, 1962)
- In Between Happiness and Misfortune (행복과 불행의 갈피에서)

=== Novels ===
- 《Revelation(啓示)》(계시, 1920)
- 《I go: An agape and a sob story》(나는 가오: 애연애화, 1920)
- 《A girl's death》(어느 소녀의 사, 1920)
- 《Hye-Won》(혜원, 1921)
- 《Death of Chaste love》(순애의 죽음, 1926)
- 《Self-awareness》(자각, 1926)
- 《Love》(사랑, 1926)
- 《Dress-up》(단장, 1927)

=== Essays ===
- 《Let youth last forever》(청춘을 영원하게, 1977)
- 《When the flowers fall, My eyes get cold》(꽃이 지면 눈이 시려라, 1985)
- 《Left behind attachment》(두고간 정, 1990)
- 《What have you become to me》(당신은 나에게 무엇이 되었삽기에, 1997)

== English translation ==
Jin Y. Park, trans. Reflections of a Zen Buddhist Nun: Essays by Zen Master Kim Iryop (Honolulu, HI: University of Hawaii Press, 2014).

== See also ==
- Sudeoksa
- Mangong
- Chunseong
