= Mary F. Scranton =

American missionary to Korea (1832–1909)

Mary Scranton
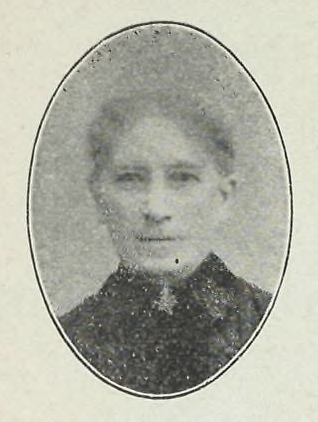
- Born: Mary Fletcher Benton; December 9, 1832; Belchertown, Massachusetts, US
- Died: October 8, 1909 (aged 76); Seoul, Korean Empire
- Occupation: Woman Missionary to Korea
- Known for: Founding Ewha Girls School

Mary Fletcher Benton Scranton (December 9, 1832 – October 8, 1909) was an American Methodist Episcopal Church missionary. She was the first Woman's Foreign Missionary Society of the Methodist Episcopal Church representative to Korea and the founder of the Ewha Girls School (Pear Blossom Academy) under Emperor Gojong. Today, the Ewha Girls School is the Ewha Womans University. Scranton also founded the Tal Syeng Day School for Women in Seoul and the Training School for Bible Women.

== Early life ==
Mary Fletcher was born on December 9, 1832, in Belchertown, Massachusetts. Her father was Rev. Erastus Benton, a Methodist Episcopal minister. She married William T. Scranton; they had a son named William B. Scranton. After the death of her husband, she moved to Ohio, where her son lived. There, she became active in the First Methodist Episcopal Church on Erie and Euclid and in the Woman's Foreign Missionary Society (WFMS). When Scranton's son was appointed to the Methodist Medical Mission in Korea in 1884, the WFMS asked Scranton to become the first female missionary in Korea.

== Life in Korea ==
Though limited by lack of language skills, Scranton began work to provide Christian education to women and children. Requesting financial assistance from WFMS to purchase some land and huts, construction began in February 1886. Though unfinished, the school opened in May 1886. The first student was Kim, a high-ranking official's concubine, but she left three months later. The first permanent student was a girl (Kkon-nim) from the street whose mother had typhus; and her second student was an orphan. In 1887, King Gojong named the school "Ewha Haktang" or "pear blossom." In the evenings, the school was the boarding home for the children and on Sundays, the children went to church in nearby Jeongdong Methodist Church.

Scranton and her co-workers experienced great difficulties because Koreans generally distrusted foreigners. They generally worked things out on their own, limiting the possibility of their learning the language. Even as she advanced in age, Scranton and her companions persisted, teaching the children English. Later, their curriculum would include Korean Language, English and classical Chinese. Later, a middle school and a primary school were established, employing Korean women as teachers. Keller somewhat criticized the early missionary group for giving their Korean students Korean English names, instead of calling them by their Korean names. However, Kim mentions that in the 1886 Korean society, "Women were not even recognized with their own names, only as someone's daughter, sister, or mother. They did not have names of their own." Their English names were probably the only name they went by as individual women.

In 1895, Scranton left Ewha. She founded the Tal Syeng Day School in Seoul and worked with Jung-Dong Methodist Episcopal Church, Tal-Syeng Methodist Episcopal Church, and Baldwin Chapel and travelled to small towns though it was very dangerous. She also trained women in evangelizing through the Training School for Bible Women. Slowly, the WFMS established churches, Sunday Schools, hospitals and dispensaries and so on, and Korea slowly began to accept foreign missionaries.

Scranton died in Korea in 1909. Scranton Memorial Hall in Ewha High School was named in her honor. During the presidency of President Moohyun Roh, the university was threatened to be shut down, but the president himself decreed that it was a historical university and signed a treaty for it to remain standing.

== Legacy ==
Scranton Women's Leadership Center, founded in 2007 under the historic American Methodist Korean Women's Mission Foundation, through which United Methodist Women predecessor organizations undertook extensive assistance in the education of Korean girls in Korea and which remains a partner in mission. The center has close ties to United Methodist Women, as the Women's Division's property committee selects the foundation's board of directors.

The American Methodist Korean Women's Mission Foundation was founded in 1924 during the Japanese occupation of Korea. The Women's Foreign Missionary Societies of the Methodist Episcopal Church and the Methodist Episcopal Church South established many schools, churches and hospitals in Korea since 1886, but in 1924 they were all incorporated to become one foundation. The mission of the American Methodist Korean Women's Mission Foundation was to empower Korean women to become whole persons in Jesus Christ through evangelism, education, medical care and social services.

During the 20th century, the Methodist churches in the United States went through several mergers. Accordingly, women's mission organizations also merged. The Women's Foreign Missionary Societies eventually became the United Methodist Women, and it became its national office.

In the 1970s, most of the property and management of schools, churches, hospitals and community centers that Women's Division used to own were transferred to Korean leadership and Korean institutions. Today, the Board of Directors of the Foundation is all Korean. With Korea's significant economic growth and its contributions to the global mission field, the Women's Division decided to extend the mission of the American Methodist Korean Women's Mission Foundation to other parts of Asia and to the world.

In 2007, Scranton Women's Leadership Center was established as the program office of the Foundation to carry on the heritage of Mrs. Scranton and the founding mothers of United Methodist Women worldwide. The North American alumni of Ewha Girls' High School decided to raise funds for scholarships in honor of Mrs. Mary F. Scranton. In 2009, they donated a significant amount of scholarship funds to the Scranton Women's Leadership Center, so that women in developing countries could go to school just as what Mrs. Scranton did for Korean women.

The Scranton Women's Leadership Center was founded with the aim creating educational opportunities for women in developing countries and train women leaders for church and society.

== Works cited ==
- Clark, Donald N. "Preface". In Heather Willoughby, ed. (2007). Footsteps Across the Frontier. Ewha Womans University Press. ISBN 978-89-7300-717-2.
- Ewha Woman's University Archive, ed. (2005). Ewha Old and New: 110 Years of History 1886-1996. Ehwa Womans University Press. ISBN 89-7300-655-X.
- Keller, Rosemary Skinner, ed. (1993). Spirituality & Social Responsibility. Abingdon Press. ISBN 978-0-687-39236-0.
- Kim, Eun Mee. "First Footsteps Across the Frontier". In Heather Willoughby, ed. (2007). Footsteps Across the Frontier. Ewha Womans University Press. ISBN 978-89-7300-717-2.
