= William B. Scranton =

American medical doctor and Methodist missionary (1856-1922)

William Benton Scranton
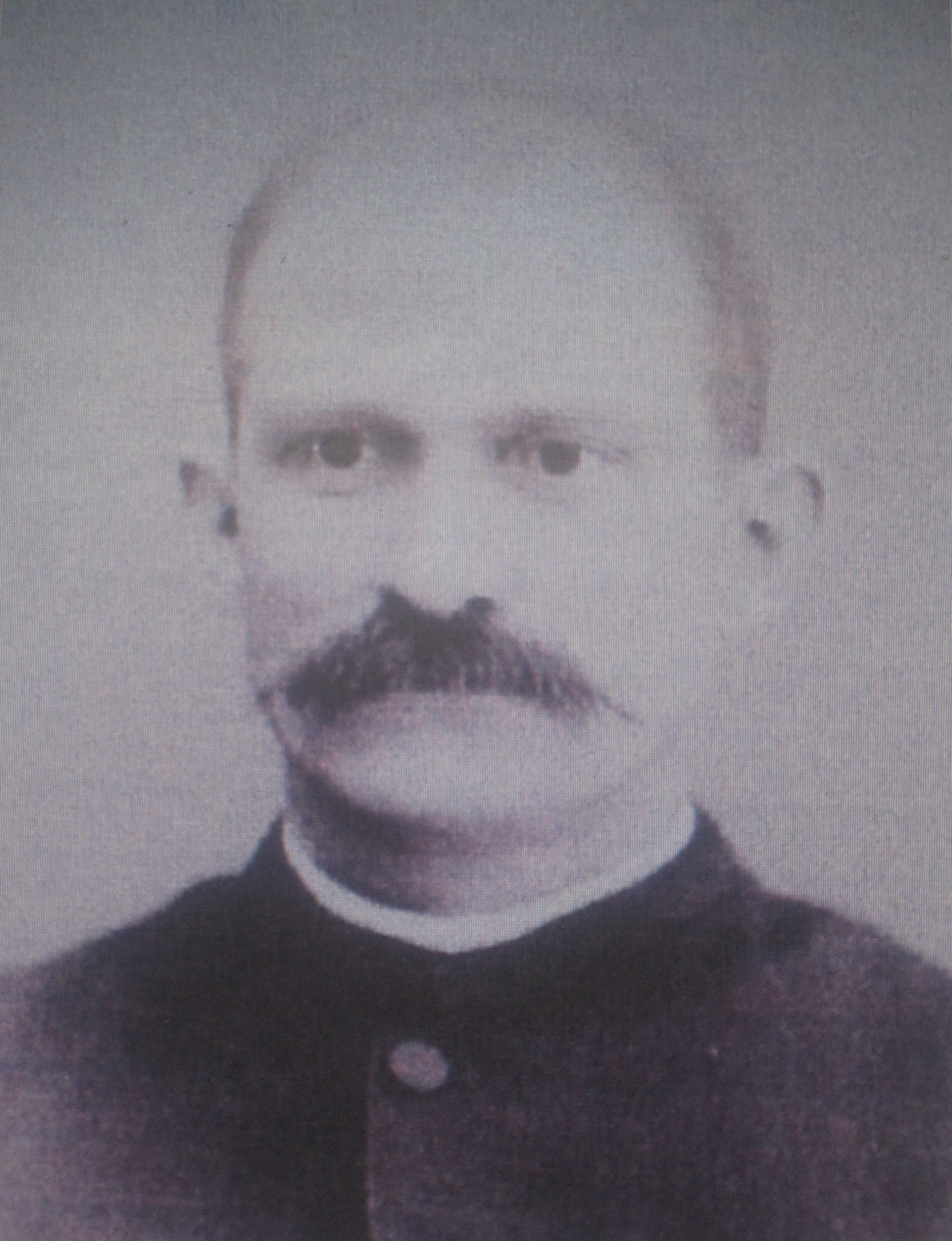
- Born: March 29, 1856; New Haven, Connecticut, U.S.
- Died: March 23, 1922 (aged 65); Kobe, Hyogo, Japan
- Occupations: Missionary, Doctor
- Known for: first Methodist missionary in Korea

William Benton Scranton (May 29, 1856 – March 23, 1922) was an American medical doctor and Methodist missionary in Korea.

== Biography ==
William B. Scranton was born on May 29, 1856, in New Haven, Connecticut, the son of William Talcott Scranton, a merchant, and Mary Fletcher Scranton. His father died when William Scranton was sixteen and moved to Ohio with his mother. He graduated from Yale University in 1878 and the New York College of Physicians and Surgeons in 1882 and practiced as a medical doctor in Cleveland, Ohio for three years.

One of American missionaries for Japan, Robert S. Maclay, visited Korea in 1884 to seek permission from the king Gojong to start Methodist mission work, and he was granted limited permission to establish a Methodist mission only for educational and medical work. After receiving the news about the permission, the missionary society of the Methodist Episcopal Church selected Rev. Henry G. Appenzeller and Dr. William B. Scranton. Mary F. Scranton decided to accompany her only child, William Scranton, as an agent of the Methodist Woman's Foreign Missionary Society (WFMS).

William Scranton arrived in Japan in February 1885 with his wife, Loulie Wyeth Arms, and his mother for mission in Korea. Because of the political uncertainty in Korea caused by Gapsin Coup occurred in 1884, Scranton went alone to Korea, leaving his wife and mother in Japan. At the invitation from Dr. Horace N. Allen, a Presbyterian missionary in Korea, Scranton joined Gwang Hye Won, a western-style Royal hospital opened in early 1885, but soon decided to establish a separate Methodist hospital. In June 1885, Scranton's wife and mother were reunited with William Scranton at a newly purchased house near the U.S. legation in Seoul. Scranton converted the house for a Methodist dispensary and began receiving patients on September 10, 1885. The dispensary was expanded in 1886 to include 5 wards, and the king Gojong gave it the name Si Pyung Won (Korean: 시병원; Hanja: 施病院), meaning "the universal relief hospital."

After experiencing struggles with Merriman C. Harris, Scranton resigned from the Methodist mission in 1907 and became Anglican. He moved to Manchuria in 1916 and to Kobe, Japan, in 1917. Scranton had served as medical inspector for the American Consulate in Kobe until he died from pneumonia on March 23, 1922. He was cremated and the ashes interred in the Kobe Foreigners Cemetery located in Kasugano.

== See also ==
- Bible translations into Korean
- Christianity in Korea
- Henry G. Appenzeller
- James Scarth Gale
- William D. Reynolds
- Horace G. Underwood
