= Yu Gwan-sun =

Korean independence activist (1902–1920)

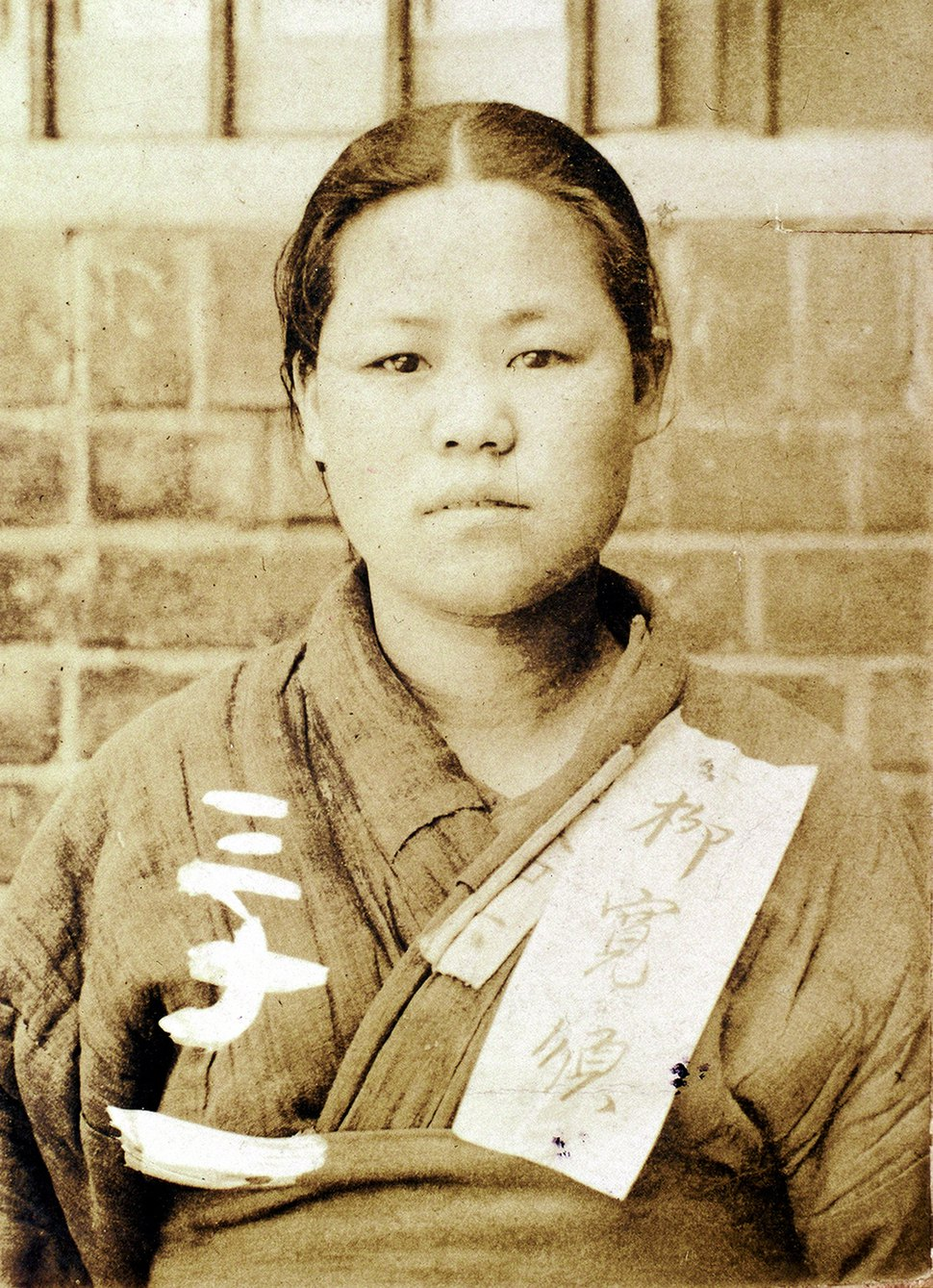
- Yu, c. 1920
- Born: December 16, 1902; Cheonan, South Chungcheong Province, Korean Empire
- Died: September 28, 1920 (aged 17); Kyōjō Prison, Keijō, Keiki-dō, Korea, Empire of Japan
- Known for: March 1st Movement
- Parents: Ryu Jung-gwan (father); Lee So-jae (mother)

Korean name
- Hangul: 유관순
- Hanja: 柳寬順
- RR: Yu Gwansun
- MR: Yu Kwansun

Yu Gwan-sun (Korean: 유관순; Hanja: 柳寬順; December 16, 1902 – September 28, 1920) was a Korean independence activist. She was particularly notable for her role in South Chungcheong during the March 1st Movement protests against Japanese colonial rule. She has since become one of the most famous Korean independence activists and a symbol for the movement.

== Early life and education ==
Yu Gwan-sun was born on December 16, 1902, near Cheonan, South Chungcheong Province, Korean Empire. She was the second of three children. She was of the Goheung Ryu clan.

Her family was influenced by her grandfather Ryu Yoon-gi and her uncle Ryu Joong-moo, who were Protestants, and so she grew up in this religious environment. She was considered an intelligent child and could memorize Bible passages after hearing them only once. She attended the Ewha Haktang, today known as Ewha Womans University, through a scholarship program that required recipients to work as teachers after graduation. At the time, few women in the country attended university. In 1919 while a student at the Ewha Haktang, she witnessed the beginnings of the March First Independence Movement. One of her teachers, Kim Ransa, encouraged Yu to join the student-led organization called the Ewha Literary Society (E-mun-hai), which organized several peaceful protests. Yu, along with a five-person group, attended several demonstrations in Seoul. On March 10, 1919, all schools, including Ewha Women's School, were temporarily closed by the Governor-General of Korea, and Yu returned home to Cheonan.

== Political activism ==
On March 1, 1919, Seoul teemed with marches by people nationwide protesting the Japanese occupation of Korea. After this protest, organizers arrived at Ewha Haktang and encouraged Yu and her friends to join a demonstration that would take place in three days, on March 5, 1919. Together with her classmates, Yu marched to Namdaemun in central Seoul. There they were detained by the police, but were freed shortly after when missionaries from their school negotiated their release. On March 13, 1919, Yu left Seoul after the Japanese government ordered all Korean schools to close on March 10 - a direct response to the protests. A famous anecdote shares that on her way back home, Yu’s friends were listening to the sound of the train and said it sounded like it was saying, “spare change, spare change (동전 한푼, 동전 한푼),” while Yu said the train sounded like it was saying, “Korean Independence, Korean Independence (대한독립, 대한독립).” She returned to her village of Jiryeong-ri (now Yongdu-ri) and there, she took a more active role in the movement.

=== Aunae Market demonstration and arrest ===
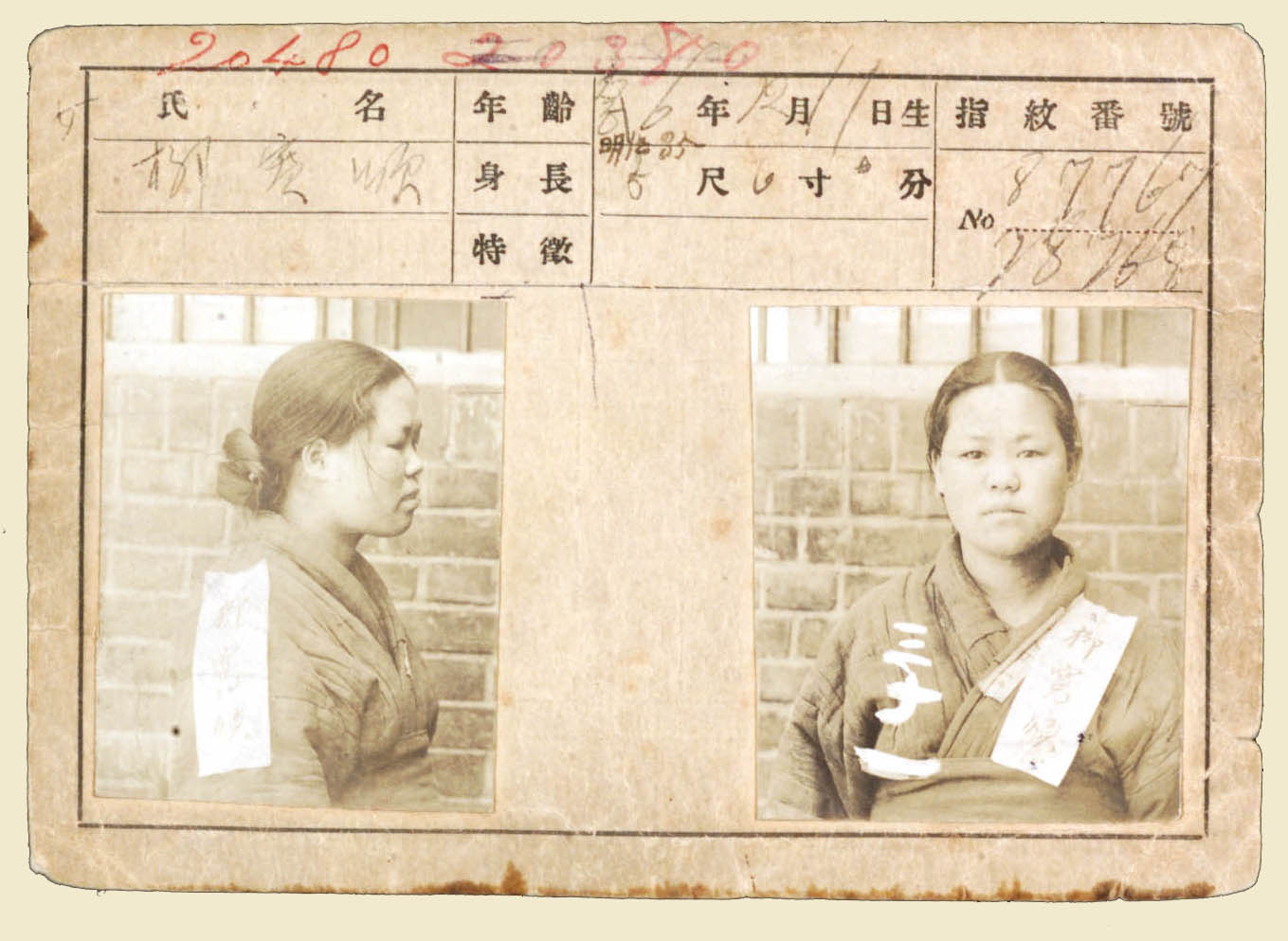
Identity card

Along with her family, Yu went door-to-door and encouraged the public to join the independence movement, which was starting to take shape. She spread the word of an organized demonstration that she had planned with Cho In-won and Kim Goo-eung and rallied the people from neighboring towns, including Yeongi, Chungju, Cheonan and Jincheon. The demonstration took place on April 1, 1919 (March 1 in the lunar calendar), at Aunae Marketplace at 9a.m., where approximately 3,000 demonstrators chanted "Long live Korean independence!" ("대한독립만세"). By 1 p.m., the Japanese military police arrived and fired on the protesters, killing 19 people, including Yu's parents. She was arrested.

The Japanese military police offered Yu a lighter sentence in exchange for an admission of guilt and her cooperation in finding other collaborators in the protest. She refused, and remained silent even after heavy torture.

=== Imprisonment and continued agitation for freedom ===
After her arrest, Yu was initially detained at Cheonan Japanese Military Police Station and was later transferred to Gongju Police Station. At the police station, she ran into her older brother, Yu Woo Seok, who was also arrested for protesting at Gongju Yeongmyeong High School.At her trial, she argued that the proceedings were run by the Japanese colonial government, the law of the governor-general of Korea, and were being overseen by an appointed Japanese judge. Despite her efforts to secure a fair trial, she was found guilty of sedition and security law violations and received a five-year sentence at Seodaemun Prison in Seoul on May 9, 1919. On June 30, 1919, Yu was sent to the Gyeongseong Court of Appeal along with other prisoners and received a three-year sentence. The other prisoners appealed at the High Court, but Yu didn’t appeal and showed her support for the independence movement. During her imprisonment, Yu's vocal support for the independence movement meant that she was heavily tortured.

On March 1, 1920, Yu planned a large-scale protest with her fellow inmates, Lee Shin-Ae and Eo Yoon-Hee, to mark the movement's first anniversary. Along with nearly 3000 inmates, they held a large protest, causing crowds to form by the prison. This led to tank traffic jams, and the police eventually showed up. As a result, all of the protestors, including Yu, were heavily tortured and she was held separately from other inmates. On April 28, 1920, Yu’s sentence was reduced to one year and a half because of Prince Yeongchin’s marriage. However, Yu died on September 28, 1920, at age 18, from injuries sustained from torture and beatings in prison. According to records discovered in November 2011, 7,500 of the 45,000 arrested in relation to the protests during that period died at the hands of Japanese authorities.

"Japan will fall", she wrote while in prison:

Even if my fingernails are torn out, my nose and ears are ripped apart, and my legs and arms are crushed, this physical pain does not compare to the pain of losing my nation. [...] My only remorse is not being able to do more than dedicating my life to my country.

=== After death ===
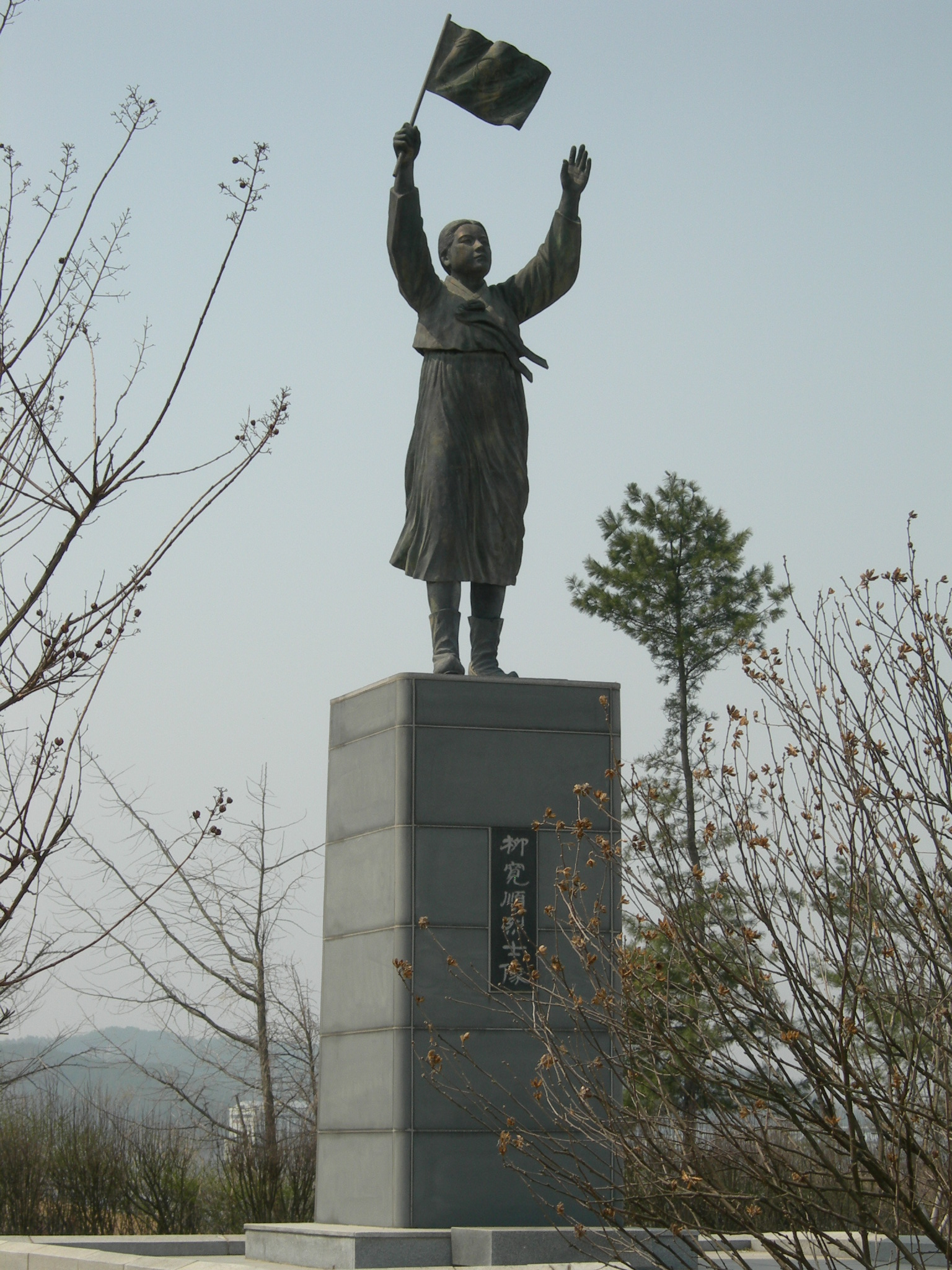
Memorial hall

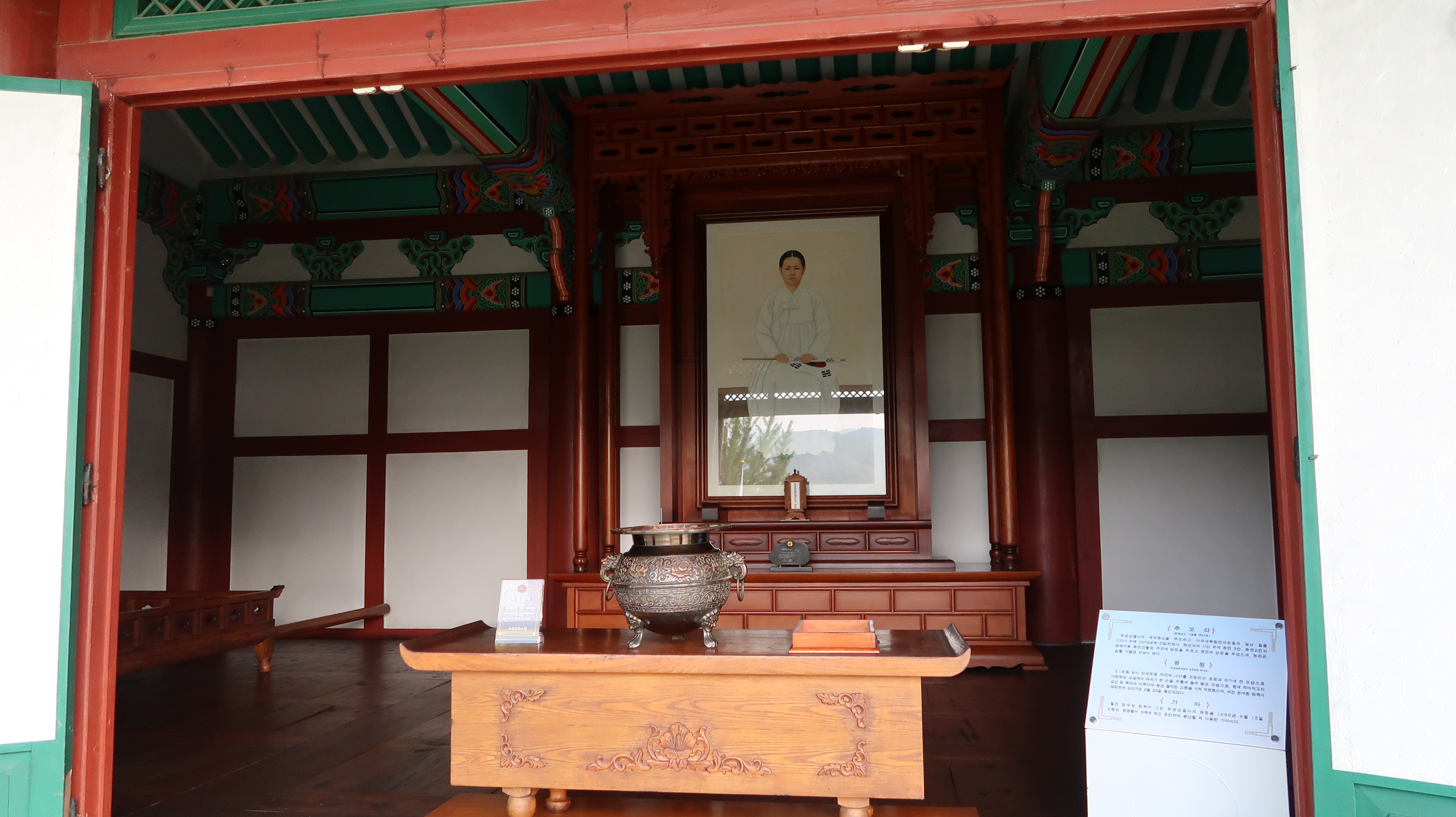
Portrait

Japanese prison officials initially refused to release Yu's body in an attempt to hide evidence of torture. The principals of Ewha Haktang, Lulu Frey and Jeanette Walter, then said that they would publicly share their suspicions of torture to the rest of the world (the American public). Authorities eventually agreed to release her body in a Socony-Vacuum oil crate due to pressure applied by Lulu Frey and Jeannette Walter, as long as the news wasn’t publicly shared and the funeral was held quietly. Walter, who dressed Yu for her funeral, in a 1959 interview relayed that her body had not been cut into pieces as had been rumored. On October 14, 1920, Yu's funeral was held at Jung-dong Church by Reverend Kim Jong-wu and her body was buried in a public cemetery in Seoul's Itaewon district. Later though, her body disappeared while the Japanese Empire built a military base where the graveyard had been. Currently, her grave in Cheonan, Chungcheongnam-do is empty.

Since 1946, a memorial service organized by people from Ewha Womans University has honored Yu. Around this time, people who took Yu's coffin from Seodaemun Prison opened the box, and this triggered rumors that the body had been cut into pieces. In 1947, the Yu Gwan Sun Memorial Association (유관순 열사 기념사업회) was formed and she was also named “a martyr who died for their country (순국의열사)” by the Screening Committee for Martyrs (순국의열사 심사위원회) in 1951. In 1972, a shrine to Yu was built in the township of Byeongcheon-myeon in Cheonan with the cooperation of Chungcheongnam-do Province and the Cheonan army.

== Legacy ==
Yu became known as "Korea's Joan of Arc". While the March 1 movement did not immediately secure Korea's freedom, the Japanese colonial government did soften some of its policies in the wake of Yu's death and the protests. Because she never abandoned her convictions after her arrest, Yu came to embody the Korean independence movement. After Korea gained independence, a shrine was built in honor of Yu with the cooperation of South Chungcheong province and the city of Cheonan. In South Chungcheong Province, an award is given in honor of Yu.

She was posthumously awarded the Order of Independence Merit in 1962.

In 2018, The New York Times published an obituary for Yu as part of its Overlooked series that provides obituaries to people who have died since 1851 that were not covered at their initial time of death.

=== Declaration of independence by the women of Korea ===
"Today, when the world claims peace (...), we must live under the rule of law, but we must live without fear and fear for our own children. It is our duty to become an active new nation under the rule of independence and to follow these teachers in the basement of Gucheon without any difficulties. With tears rising from the internal organs and hard work coming from the music, we will lie down on our beloved fellow Koreans! Do not let the time be too early to do anything; let the work run fast."

== Name spelling ==
There is some uncertainty over how to spell her surname in Hangul, which also affects the English spelling of her surname. In the South Korean standard of the Korean language, the initial ㄹ at the start of words is dropped when spoken, and is called the "initial sound rule" (두음법칙). Yu's family name "柳" becomes "유" even if it was originally pronounced "류". In April 2007, an application was made to a local court to allow people to request changing their surname's spelling in the family register from 유 to 류. This was eventually confirmed by the South Korean Constitutional Court.

The Yu Gwan-Sun Memorial Association (유관순열사기념사업회) used 유 from its founding in 1947, but eventually changed to 류 in 2001. However, in 2014, it reverted to the 유 spelling, citing a need to remove confusion, in light of the consistent use of 유 by textbooks and both official Korean government and unofficial texts.

== Popular culture ==
=== Film ===
- Portrayed by Go Chun-hee in the 1948 film Yu Gwan-sun
- Portrayed by Do Geum-bong in the 1959 film Yu Gwan-sun
- Portrayed by Eom Aeng-ran in the 1966 film Yu Gwan-sun
- Portrayed by Moon Ji-hyun in the 1974 film Yu Gwan-sun
- Portrayed by Go Ah-seong in the 2019 film A Resistance
- Portrayed by Lee Sae-bom in the 2019 film 1919 Yu Gwan-sun

=== Animation ===
- Portrayed by Jung Mi-sook in the 1993-1994 KBS animation series Cho-ryong's Old Travel

=== Art and poetry ===
- Figures in the book Dictee by Theresa Hak Kyung Cha
