= Chung Hyun-back =

South Korean historian (born 1953)

- 정현백

Minister of Gender Equality and Family
- In office 7 July 2017 – 21 September 2018
- President: Moon Jae-in
- Prime Minister: Lee Nak-yeon
- Succeeded by: Jin Sun-mee

Personal details
- Born: 9 April 1953 (age 73) Busan, South Korea
- Party: independent
- Education: Seoul National University; Ruhr University Bochum

Chung Hyun-back (Korean: 정현백; Hanja: 鄭鉉柏; born 9 April 1953) is a South Korean emeritus professor of history at Sungkyunkwan University previously served as President Moon Jae-in's first Minister of Gender Equality and Family.

Before entering politics in 2017, she had dedicated her career in academia and civil societies.

Chung first joined Kyonggi University's faculty as its assistant professor in 1984. In 1986 she moved to Sungkyunkwan University department of history as its associate professor and was later promoted to its professor.

Also, Chung was the co-head of two large NGOs in Korea, the Korean Women's Association United and People's Solidarity for Participatory Democracy, and also led NGOs for Inter-Korean relations - Civil Peace Forum and Korean Council for Reconciliation and Cooperation.

She holds three degrees in history-related subjects - a bachelor in history education and a master's in Western history from Seoul National University and a doctorate in German history from Ruhr University Bochum.
