= Park In-deok =

South Korean writer (1896–1980)

- Born: September 24, 1896; Seoul, Joseon
- Died: April 3, 1980 (aged 83); Seoul, South Korea
- Occupations: Poet, journalist, artist
- Writing career
- Period: 1896-1980
- Genres: Poetry, novel, art, paint, essay, drama

Korean name
- Hangul: 박인덕
- Hanja: 朴仁德
- RR: Bak Indeok
- MR: Pak Indŏk

Art name
- Hangul: 은봉
- Hanja: 銀峰
- RR: Eunbong
- MR: Ŭnbong

Courtesy name
- Hangul: 임덕
- Hanja: 姙德
- RR: Imdeok
- MR: Imdŏk

Park In-deok (Korean: 박인덕; Hanja: 朴仁德; September 24, 1896 – April 3, 1980) was a Korean independence activist, educator, writer, poet and a social activist. She used the art name of Eunbong (은봉; 銀峰).

Park Indeok belongs to the first generation of Korean female writers, all of whom were born around 1900.

She lectured in the United States and Canada in 1936, established a vocational school, and tried to convert Koreans to Christianity.

Park Indeok wrote her autobiography titled September Monkey in 1954, having it published by Harper & Brothers. In the book she tells of her childhood during immense social and political upheaval in Korea under Japanese colonial rule.

== See also ==
- Na Hye-sok
- Kim Hwallan
- Hwang Jini
- Shin Saimdang
- Heo Nanseolheon
- Yu Gam-dong
