= Ewha Haktang =

Historic school in Seoul, Korea

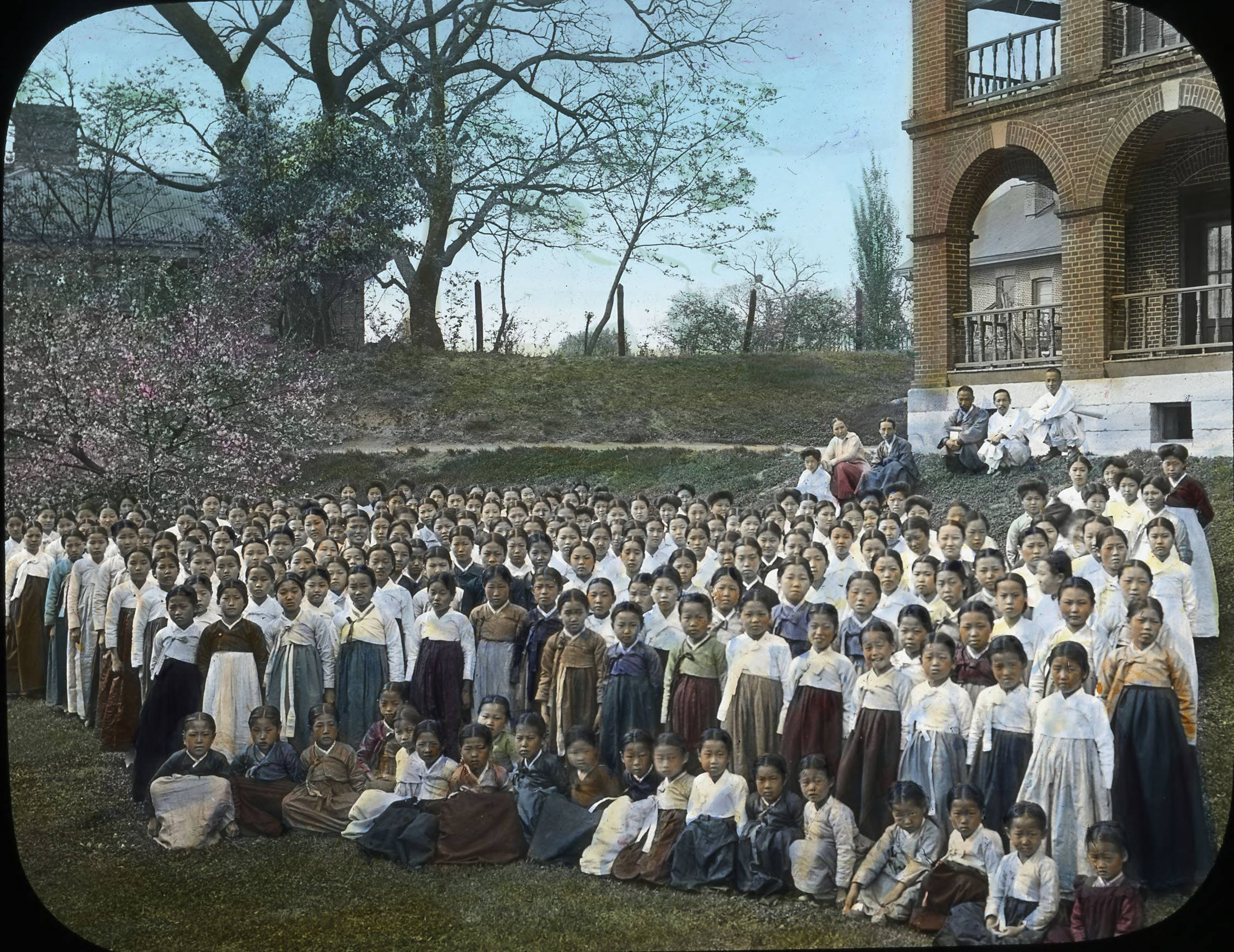
- the lower grades of Ewha Hakdang, in the 1910s
- Hansung, Junggu, Jeong-dong; Korea

Information
- Established: May 31, 1886
- Founder: Mary F. Scranton

Ewha Haktang (Korean: 이화학당; Hanja: 梨花學堂) is a Korean secondary education institution established in 1886 in Hansung-bu, Joseon, and is one of the earliest women's education institutions in Korea. The school name Ewha comes from Ewha Haktang and is the forerunner of Ewha Womans' University and Ewha Girls' High School. It is also the alma mater of independence activist Yu Gwan-sun.

== History ==
=== Foundation ===
In 1886, a Korean tile-roofed house with a floor space of 200 pyeong was built in Jeong-dong, Seoul, and this is the beginning of teacher construction. It could accommodate about 35 students, and it was equipped with classrooms and teacher accommodations. The number of students increased to 7 in 1887, to 18 in 1888, and to 30 in 1893. As the number of students increased, the existing hanok teacher was demolished in 1897, and the main hall, a two-story Western-style building equipped with the latest facilities at the time, was constructed on the spot. The middle school was established in 1904, the ordinary and high school general departments in 1908, and the university department in 1910. In 1914, Ewha Kindergarten was established and the university had one graduation ceremony. In 1915, the kindergarten teachers' department was established, and Simpson Hall was completed. In 1917, the name of the secondary school department was changed to the university preparatory department. Ewha Hakdang separated the high school department and the general department from Ewha Hakdang in 1918 and opened as Ewha Womans High School and Ewha Womans University School, respectively. In 1925, after changing the name of the university department and the university preparatory department to Ewha Womans University, the liberal arts and music department was newly established. The first graduation ceremony of Ewha Womans University was held in 1927, and the following year, in 1928, the kindergarten teachers' department of Ewha Hakdang was renamed Ewha Nursery School. Due to such a change in the school's educational system, the name of Ewha Hakdang was no longer used from 1928.

Ewha Hakdang was founded in 1886 in Jeong-dong, Jung District, Seoul. Mary F. Scranton, a female missionary from the Methodism, the founder of Ewha Hakdang, is the mother of William Scranton. The school's name was given to King Gojong of the Korean Empire and was Korea's first private female education institution.

In 1904, the secondary school was established. High school courses were added in 1908, and university courses were added in 1910. First graduates of secondary school were graduated in 1908, and first graduates of university courses were graduated in 1914.

=== Architecture of the main hall of Ewha Hakdang ===
The main hall of Ewha Hakdang was built by Shim Eui-seok, a famous architect at the time, from 1897 to 1899.

=== Growth ===
In 1918, the general department was divided into Ewha Girls' High School and the high school department was divided into Ewha Womans University. The university department was promoted to a vocational school in 1925 and opened as Ewha Womans University. In 1928, the last remaining kindergarten curriculum was independent as Ewha Nursery School, and the name of Ewha Hakdang disappeared as schools at all levels were operated under an independent system.

== Subject ==
It was initially troubled by the Korean traditional notion of avoiding women's education and the exclusive nature of Westerners. Looking at the initial situation, Mrs. Scranton was pointed out as a "Western goblin", and the first student was a female student who had cholera. And in 1887, it was very difficult to find students, with the number of students increasing to only seven. As for the purpose of education at Ewha Hakdang, Gilmore pointed out, "It is to make Korean girls an exemplary housewife and to make Protestant missionaries among their relatives and colleagues." Since the school was established by Protestantism, the Bible is the most important as a subject, and Mrs.Scranton also taught English, English grammar, English literature, Mathematics, Hangul, Music, History, and Writing, as well as Chinese characters. In other words, she taught subjects that can be applied in real life.

== Weddings and graduation ceremonies ==
Prior to 1908, there was no graduation ceremony, but most of them quit their studies by getting married. he elderly female student's wedding was thus assisted by missionaries. The missionary served as the girl's guardian to save the groom and pay for the wedding.

Among the weddings arranged by a missionary at Ewha Hakdang, Korea's first Western-style wedding was held on April 18, 1897, with groom Cho Man-soo and bride Kim Ryun-si. Born in 1879, Kim Ryun-si was a student who attended Ewha Hakdang for nine years, and Cho Man-soo was born in Gwacheon on January 1, 1876, and came to Seoul at the age of 17 to teach the Korean language for Josephine Ophelia Payne, the current teacher of Ewha Hakdang.

== See also ==
- Ewha Girls High School
- Ewha Womans University
- Encyclopedia of Korean Culture – Ewha Hakdang
