= Helen Kim =

Korean educator (1899–1970)

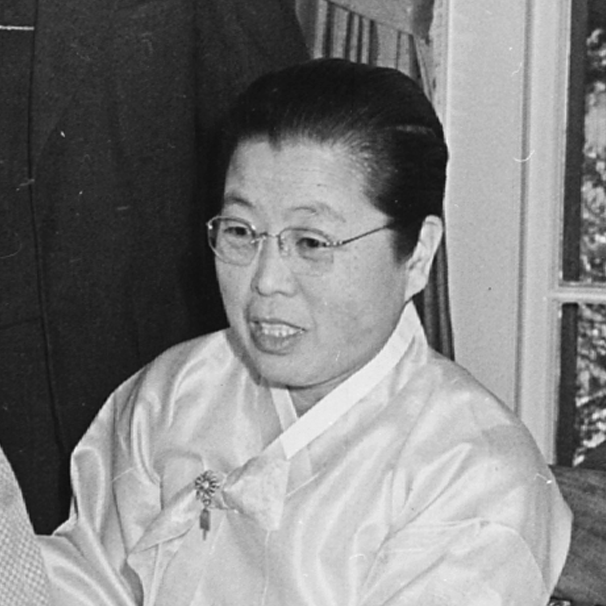
- Busan 1951
- Born: 1899; Seoul, Korean Empire
- Died: February 10, 1970 (aged 71); Seoul, South Korea
- Occupations: politician, educator, and social activist
- Writing career
- Period: 1899–1970
- Genres: Poetry, novel, essay, drama
- Notable awards: Order of Cultural Merit (1963, rank unknown)

Korean name
- Hangul: 김활란
- Hanja: 金活蘭
- RR: Gim Hwalran
- MR: Kim Hwallan

Art name
- Hangul: 우월
- Hanja: 又月
- RR: Uwol
- MR: Uwŏl

Helen Kim (also Kim Hwal-lan; Korean: 김활란; 1899–1970) was a South Korean politician, educator, social activist, and feminist. Her art name was Wuwol (우월). Kim was the founder of the World Federation of Methodist and Uniting Church Women (WFMUCW), and the daily Korean newspaper, The Korea Times.

== Biography ==
Kim was born in Incheon to a large, modern family. She attended Christian schools as a girl. She attended Ewha Girls School. Between graduating from Ewha, she "established the national YWCA Korea" in 1922. Then she went to Wesleyan College where she earned her bachelor's degree in 1924. Kim went to Boston University for a master's in philosophy (1931) and then received her PhD in education from Columbia University in 1931.

Kim later became dean of a girls' college (Ewha College) in 1931. At the time of her death, it was the largest women's university in the world.

Kim was involved with Kŭnwuhwoe, which was a national women's organization that was dedicated to ending the "remaining Korean feudal practices and beliefs as well as colonial constraints." However, she didn't stay involved for long because she was "unwilling to work with women who were Marxists and socialists."

On 26 October 1939, the original Charter of Assent for the World Federation of Methodist and Uniting Church Women (WFMUCW), then called the World Federation of Methodist Women, was signed by 27 countries in Pasadena, California, USA. This was a project begun by Kim in 1923.

In 1945, Kim, O Ch'ŏn-sŏk, Yu Ŏk-kyŏm and Paek Nak-chun formed the Korean Committee on Education. This committee worked with the United States in the Education Bureau, making recommendations about schools and their staff.

Kim became director of the Office of Public Information for President Syngman Rhee in 1948. In 1949, she attended the United Nations General Assembly in Boston. As the director of the Office of Public Information, she recommended that an English newspaper was needed. She chose the name of the paper, deciding that The Korea Times was the best name for representing the whole country. The newspaper was published on November 1, 1950.

== Controversy ==
Kim is a controversial figure because of her involvement in activities that were considered "pro-Japanese" during the Japanese occupation of Korea. As the principal of Ehwa, she used her position to inspire others to encourage the men in their lives to join the military draft for the Japanese army. Kim herself justified her actions as "necessary in order to keep Ewha open under harsh colonial policies" and could also be seen as consistent with Methodist Church teachings (Kim's religion). Kim continues to be an agent of controversy, with her effigy being burned and students protesting her statue.

== The World Federation of Methodist and Uniting Church Women ==
The World Federation of Methodist and Uniting Church Women (formally the World Federation of Methodist Women) is a world-wide organisation founded by Kim in the 1920s. Its motto is To Know Christ and Make Him Known. The aim of the WFMUCW is stated on their website:

"The World Federation of Methodist and Uniting Church Women (WFMUCW) seeks to aid in establishing Christ's Kingdom among all peoples and in all areas of life; to share the abundant life of Christ through evangelism, healing ministries, education and social services: to assist in the promotion of mission outreach throughout the world: to seek with women of all continents, fellowship and mutual help in the building of a Christian community, and to develop bonding links and partnership with women of other Christian Churches, ecumenical bodies, and the United Nations in promoting peace and justice."

Kim first proposed her vision of a world-wide Methodist organisation for women in 1923. The first meeting to plan the formation of what was to be called the World Federation of Methodist Women took place in 1929. The first Charter of Assent was signed by 27 countries on October 26, 1939 in Pasadena, California.

The WFMUCW held an assembly in Kansas during the 1944–1948 term, where the first President, Evelyn Riley Nicholson, was elected.

In 1954, the WFMUCW became affiliated with the World Methodist Council.

On 17 February 1983, the WFMUCW became a non-governmental organisation (NGO) with the United Nations.

In 1996, an assembly was held in Rio de Janeiro, at which the name was officially changed from the World Federation of Methodist Women to the World Federation of Methodist and Uniting Church Women.

In 2011, the WFMUCW celebrated the 100th anniversary of Ehwa College where Kim had been dean by developing the Helen Kim Memorial Scholarship, a five-year leadership development program for young Methodist and Uniting women.
