= List of Korean independence activists =

The following is a list of known people (including non-Koreans) that participated in the Korean independence movement against the colonization of Korea by Japan.

== Early activists ==
People whose main independence activities were conducted before 1910, during Joseon and the Korean Empire.

- Choe Ik-hyeon
- Choe Sihyeong
- Hwang Hyeon
- Min Yeong-hwan
- Shin Dol-seok
- Yi Han-eung
- Yi Sang-seol
- Yi Tjoune
- Yi Wijong

== Korean activists ==
Ethnic Koreans whose main independence activities were after 1910.

- Ahn Bong-soon
- Ahn Chai-hong
- Ahn Chang Ho
- Ahn Doo-hee
- An Gong-geun
- An Gyeong-shin
- An Jung-geun
- An Myeong-geun
- An Sang-deok
- Bae Gyeong-jin
- Baek Gwan-su
- Baek Jung Gi
- Baek Nam-sik
- Baek Seong-uk
- Bang Ho-san
- Bang Joon-pyo
- Bang Kyung-han
- Byeon Hee-yong
- Cha Geum-bong
- Cha Mirisa
- Cha Sang-myeong
- Chae Eung-eon
- Chae Sang-deok
- Chaechan
- Cho Gi-shin
- Cho Maeng-seon
- Cho Man-sik
- Cho Myeong-seon
- Cho Myung-ha
- Cho Seong-hwan
- Choe Chang-ik
- Choe Deok-sin
- Choe Du-seon
- Choe Hyon
- Choe Ja-nam
- Choe Nam-seon
- Choe Sang-rim
- Choe Yong-dal
- Choe Yong-shin
- Choein
- Choerin
- Choi Jae-hyung
- Choi Jin-dong
- Chŏng Sangjin
- Chu Ki-chol
- Chu Yo-han
- Chung Chil-sung
- Gil Seon-ju
- Gong Deok-gwi
- Gu Young-pil
- Gwak Sang-hoon
- Gye Bong-woo
- Gye Ji-pung
- Ham Tae-young
- Han Bong-su
- Han Hoon
- Han Kyu-seol
- Han Sang-ryeol
- Han Yong-un
- Heo Jeong
- Ho Hon
- Ho Jong-suk
- Ho Ka-i
- Ho Song-taek
- Hong Beom-do
- Hong Jin
- Hong Myong-hui
- Hong Pil-ju
- Hong Seung-ro
- Hwang Ae-deok
- Hwang Byeong-gil
- Hwang Byung-hak
- Hwang Tae-seong
- Hyun Ik-cheol
- Hyun Jeong-gyeong
- Hyun Joon-hyuk
- Im Deuk-san
- Im Won-geun
- In Han-soo
- Jang Chang-heon
- Jang Do-bin
- Jang Gi-cho
- Jang Hyeong
- Jang In-hwan
- Jeon Deok-gi
- Jeon Myeong-un
- Jeong Inbo
- Jeong Jae-gwan
- Jeong Jin-ryong
- Jeong Jong-myeong
- Jeongshin
- Ji Cheong-cheon
- Jo Do-seon
- Jo So-ang
- Joo Sang-ok
- Ju Se-juk
- Jung Jung-hwa
- Jung Nosik
- Kang Dal-young
- Kang Hae-seok
- Kang Kon
- Kang Kyŏng-ae
- Kang Woo-kyu
- Kang Won-sang
- Kang Young-seok
- Alexandra Kim
- Kim Beop-rin
- Kim Byeong-cho
- Kim Byeong-hyun
- Kim Chaek
- Kim Chang-man
- Kim Chun-yon
- Kim Chwajin
- Kim Dan-ya
- Kim Dong-pil
- Kim Dong-sam
- Kim Dong-seok
- Kim Doo-hwa
- Kim Gyo-heon
- Kim Gyo-shin
- Kim Hong-il
- Kim Hyun-chul
- Kim Ik-sang
- Kim Il
- Kim Il Sung
- Kim Iryeop
- Kim Jae-bong
- Kim Ji-seop
- Kim Jong-suk
- Kim Jun-yop
- Kim Ku
- Kim Kwang-chu
- Kim Kwang-hyop
- Kim Kwang-seop
- Kim Kyu-sik
- Kim Maria
- Kim Myeong-sun
- Kim Pen Hwa
- Kim Ransa
- Kim Rip
- Kim San
- Kim Sang-ok
- Kim Sang-yoon
- Kim Seong-beom
- Kim Seong-hwa
- Kim Seong-su
- Kim Seong-suk
- Kim Si-hyun
- Kim Si-jung
- Kim Tu-bong
- Kim Ung
- Kim Won-bong
- Kim Yak-su
- Kim Yak-yeon
- Kim Yong-bom
- Lee Beom-seok
- Lee Beom-yoon
- Lee Bong-chang
- Lee Cheol
- Lee Chu-hyeong
- Lee Gi
- Lee Gu-yeon
- Lee Gyeong-hee
- Lee Gyu-pung
- Lee Hee-seung (writer and linguist)
- Lee Hoe-yeong
- Lee Hong-rae
- Lee Hye-su
- Lee Hyo-sun
- Lee Hyun-sang
- Lee Jin-ryong
- Lee Jong-am
- Lee Jong-hak
- Lee Jong-il
- Lee Jong-uk
- Lee Jun-yong
- Lee Jung-gu
- Lee Kang
- Lee Kang-nyeon
- Lee Kwang-su
- Lee Seong-gu
- Lee Seong-rim
- Lee Seung-hun
- Lee Su-heung
- Lee Tak
- Lee Un-hyeong
- Lee Yong-dam
- Lee Yong-do
- Mirok Li
- Lim Chi-jung
- Lyuh Woon-hyung
- Ma Man-bong
- Mangong
- Mu Chong
- Mun Il-pyeong
- Mun Si-hwan
- Na Chang-heon
- Na Cheol
- Na Geum-ju
- Na Hye-sok
- Na Kyung-seok
- Na Seok-ju
- Nam Ja-hyun
- No Baek-rin
- Noh Eung-gyu
- Oh Gi-ho
- Oh Hwa-young
- Oh Se-chang
- Oh Seong-ryun
- Ok Kwan-bin
- Paek Nam-Un
- Pak Hon-yong
- Pak Kum-chol
- Park Byeong-gil
- Park Eunsik
- Park Hee-do (independence activist)
- Park Hee-kwang
- Park Hyeong-mu
- Park In-deok
- Park Jae-hyeok
- Park Jang-ho
- Park Sun-cheon
- Park Yeol
- Park Yong-man
- Park Young-hee
- Pyeon Gang-ryeol
- Syngman Rhee
- Ri Yong
- Ryu Gyeong-su
- Seo Il
- Seo Sang-han
- Seo Yun-je
- Shin Chae-ho
- Shin Seok-gu
- Sim Hun
- Sin Ik-hui
- Soh Jaipil
- Son Byong-hi
- Song Du-yong
- Song Hak-seon
- Song Nam-heon
- Sung Jusik
- Tak Gong-gyu
- Tae Yang-uk
- Won Tae-geun
- Won Tae-woo
- Woo Deok-soon
- Yang Geun-hwan
- Yang Kit'ak
- Yang Sebong
- Yeom Dong-jin
- Yi Chaemyŏng
- Yi Dong-hwi
- Yi Dong-nyung
- Yi Kang-guk
- Yi Kuk-no
- Yi Sang-baek
- Yi Sang-hwa
- Yi Sang-jae
- Yi Sangnyong
- Yi Yuksa
- Yongseong
- Yoo Dong-ha
- Yoo Jin-hee
- Yoo Seok-hyun
- Yoo Seung-ryeol
- Yoon Se-bok
- Yu Gwansun
- Yun Bong-gil
- Yun Chi-young
- Yun Dong-ju
- Yun Gong-heum
- Yun Ja-young
- Yun Se-ju

== Non-Korean activists ==
- Chiang Kai-shek
- Ernest Bethell
- Frank Schofield
- Kaneko Fumiko
- George L. Shaw
- Homer Hulbert
- Sun Yat-sen
- Zhou Enlai
- Tatsuji Fuse
- George Ashmore Fitch
- Clarence N. Weems Jr.
- Robert Grierson
- Henry Berkowitz
- Franziska Donner
- Norbert Weber
- Soong Mei-ling
- Rabindranath Tagore
- George W. Norris
- Floyd W. Tomkins
- Selden P. Spencer
- Archibald Barker
- Stanley Martin
- Frederick Arthur MacKenzie
- Fred A. Dolph
