= Timeline of the Kwangmu Reform =

The following is a timeline of the Gwangmu Reform which lasted from 1897 to 1907, which was a reforms for modernize Korea from the late 19th century to the early 20th century. It also includes the early modernizations of Korea leading up to the era.

== Early modernizations (1883–94) ==
- 1883: March. The Korea-Japanese Underground Cable Construction Treaty (조일해저전선부설조약,朝日海底電線敷設條約) was signed by Korea and Japan. This led to a telegraphic connection between Busan and Nagasaki.
- 1883: May. American minister Lucius Foote arrived to take command of the modernization of Chosun's older army units that had not started Westernizing.

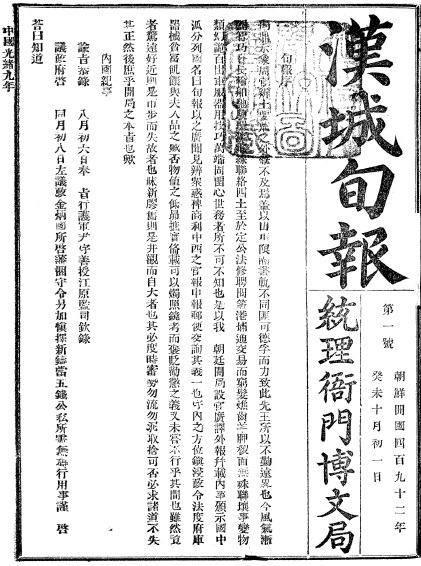
Hanseong sunbo, the first modern newspaper in Korea

- 1883: July. The first-ever Korean mission to the United States. The Ministry of Presswork and Publication (박문국,博文局) was opened for the modernisation of the printing industry.
- 1883: August. The first edition of the Hanseong sunbo was published. It was published in Seoul (then called Hanseong), Joseon from 1883 to 1884 as the first native Korean newspaper. It was written in Hanmun. It is not the first newspaper to be published in Korea; that was the 1881 Chōsen Shinpō, which was primarily written in both Japanese and Hanmun.
- 1884: The Daedong Corporation (대동상회, 大同商會), the first modern domestic corporation in Korea, was established.
- 1885: February. The first Royal Medical Clinic, the Gwanghyewon was opened with the introduction of modern medicine by Horace Newton Allen.
- 1885: May. Presbyterianism is introduced to Chosun by Horace Grant Underwood. Many other Christian pastors came to Chosun, which became the fundamental background for religious freedom and equality between Koreans.
- 1885: July. The Korea-Chinese Cable Treaty (조청전선조약, 朝淸電線條約) is signed and enforced, leading to a telegraphic connection between Hanseong and Peking.
- 1885: August. Establishment of the Baejae Hakdang by Henry Appenzeller. Although initially recognised as an 'Academy', it became a college in 1895.
- 1886: February. Proclamation of abolishment of slavery inheritance within Chosun. This is the unofficial start of equalisation of people within the kingdom. It also paved the way for abolishment of slavery in the Gabo Reform.
- 1886: May. Queen Min gave her patronage to the first all-girls' educational institution, Ewha Academy (이화학당, 梨花學堂), established in Seoul by American missionary, Mary F. Scranton. This institution later became the Ewha University.

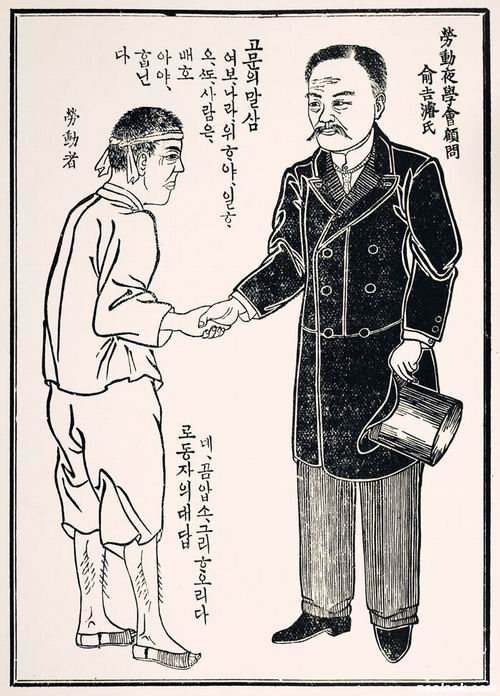
A cartoon that shows a former Yangban and a commoner using the same speech level.

- 1886: September. The Yukyeong-gongwon (육영공원, 育英公院) is established. This was the first public school to be opened in Chosun.
- 1887: March. The Korean Imperial Telegraphic Office (조선전보총국, 朝鮮電報總局) was opened for a more efficient management of the telegraphic lines operating in Korea. The office was in use until 1893, when it became into the Korean Imperial Telegraphic and Postal Office (전우총국, 電郵總局).
- 1887: October. American missionary William B. Scranton establishes the first women's hospital, the Lillian Harris Memorial Hospital (보구여관,普救女館). Lillian Harris Memorial Hospital would become the predecessor to Ewha Womans University hospital. The hospital also operated the first medical class for women. One of the students went to the Woman's Medical College of Baltimore, becoming the first female doctor at Korea in 1900.
- 1888: February. 1888, General William McEntyre Dye and two other military instructors arrived from the US, followed in May by a fourth instructor. The Americans taught at the first modern military academy called the Yeonmu-gongwon (연무공원, 鍊武公院) and trained many Koreans.
- 1888: May. Korea independently constructs the Southern Cable Line (남로전선, 南路電線), connecting Hanseong and Busan.
- 1890: January. The Korean Merchant's Association for Fairness is opened by Kim Jae-jun (김재전, 金在田), Lee Gun-seo (이군서, 李君瑞) and Park Myung-gyu (박명규, 朴明珪). The Association promoted usage of foreign weight and measurement standards in the domestic market. It had offices in Incheon, Wonsan and Busan.
- 1891: February. The Korean Northern Cable Treaty (조선북로전선조약, 朝鮮北路電線條約) is signed by China and Korea. By this treaty, the telegraphic service from Seoul to Wonsan is in operation.
- 1892: Issuance of the Baekdonghwa (백동화,白銅貨), the last coin issued during the Joseon Dynasty, with the enforcement of the New Currency Regulations (신식화폐조례,新式貨幣條例). Although it caused some chaos on which currency to use and its introduction triggered counterfeiting, it also stabilised the inflation within the peninsula.
- 1893: March. The Korean Imperial Naval Academy is established. The academy produces approximately 160 officers before its close during and after the First Sino-Japanese War.
- 1894: February. The outbreak of the Donghak Peasant Revolution, which leads to the First Sino-Japanese War.

== Japanese interventions (1894–97) ==
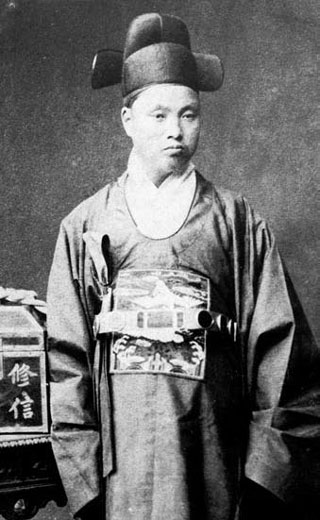
Kim Hong-jip (1842–96), prime minister of the Gabo Government

This phase show much development within the Korean Peninsula. It is a brief period of an intense power struggle between Japan and Russia, competing to expand their influence in the peninsula.

- 1894: June. The Gabo Reform is initiated. The reform ends in February the next year.

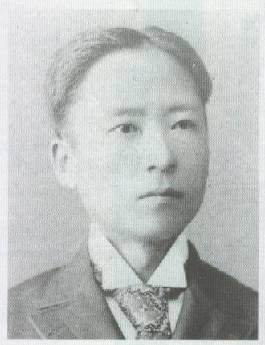
Seo Jae-pil, the founder of the Independence Club.

- 1895: 8 October. Empress Myeongseong is assassinated by Japanese agents under Miura Goro.
- 1896: 11 February. King Gojong flees to the Russian legation in Seoul.
- 1896: 2 July. Establishment of the Independence Club by Seo Jae-pil (서재필,徐載弼).

== Later modernizations (1897–1905) ==
- 1897: 4 October. The proclamation of the Korean Empire. Efforts for modernisation were spurred with the coronation of Gojong as Emperor of Korea but were restrained by Japan after the Russo-Japanese War in 1905.
- 1897: February. King Gojong established the Board of Marshals. All military power was henceforth centralized to the Emperor.
- 1897: 20 February. King Gojong returned to the palace after 1 year of refuge at the Russian legation.
- 1897: September. The Donghwa Pharmacy opened in Seoul, Korea. The established corporation, now known as the Dong Wha Pharmacy Corporation., Limited (동화약품(주), 同和藥品(株)). The company, now the oldest pharmacy-based corporation in Korea, has products that are nationally famous, with its 'folding fan' trademark.
- 1897: October. Gojong declares the Korean Empire and became the Gwangmu Emperor, the first imperial head of state and hereditary sovereign of the Empire of Korea. Most historians view this as the official declaration of the Gwangmu Reform (광무개혁, 光武改革). Soongsil Academy was founded in Pyongyang as a private school by Dr. William M. Baird, a missionary of the Northern Presbyterian Church of America. The Soongsil University is its descendant.
- 1897: November. John McLeavy Brown constructs Pagoda Park.
- 1898: January. The Seoul Electric Corporation (한성전기회사, 漢城電氣會社), or the Korea-American Electric Corporation (한미전기회사,韓美電氣會社) was opened as a joint-venture company between Americans Henry Collbran, H.R. Bostwick and Emperor Gojong.
- 1898: May. The Jong-hyun Catholic Church (종현본당, 鐘峴本堂) was finished of construction. It was the first Gothic architecture to be built in Korea. It was later called the Myeongdong Cathedral, the centre of the Korean 20th century. It is registered as a national historical landmark.
- 1898: August. Brown reported blueprint of the Pan-Korean railway to Gojong.
- 1898: September. Kim Hong-nyuk (김홍륙,金鴻陸) attempted assassination of Gojong by putting excess amount of opium in his coffee. It is to be noted that Gojong was a coffee lover. While Gojong spat out the coffee upon drinking it, his son Sunjong drank the opium-tainted coffee and suffered from mental and physical disabilities from the incident.
- 1898: September 5. The Imperial Capital Gazette released its first print. The president of the company was Nam Gung-euk (남궁억,南宮檍).

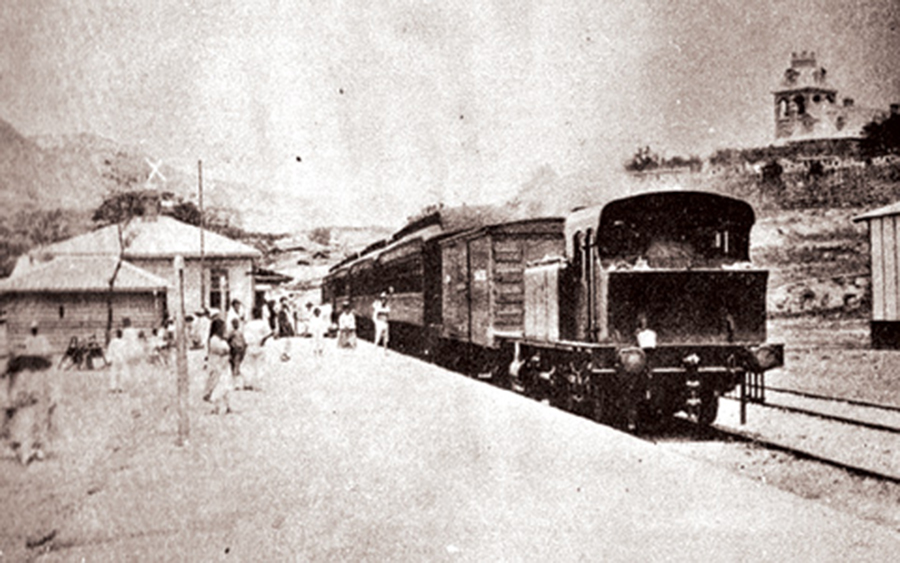
The West Gate of Seoul

- 1899: January. Several Korean entrepreneurs and high-ranking officials establish the Daehan Cheon-il Bank (대한천일은행, 大韓天一銀行). The bank operated as both a local bank and central bank. The bank is the predecessor of the Woori Bank.
- 1899: April. The Gyeongseong Medical School, the first modern national hospital, opened. It is the forerunner to the present-day Seoul National University Hospital.
- 1899: May. American businessmen Henry Collbran and H.R.Bostwick opened the first tram lines within Seoul (the West gate-East gate line).
- 1899: August. The promulgation of the Korean Imperial Legislation (대한제국국제, 大韓帝國國制) by the Ministry of Justice (법규교정소,法規校正所). This is of certain significance, as it led to Gojong's success in modernisation of the empire. It also took international laws into consideration. Although the actual legislation is very short, numerous other edicts were proclaimed to be used like laws.
- 1899: September. The establishment of the Northwest Railway Bureau (서북철도국,西北鐵道局), an agency within the Gungnaebu (궁내부,宮內府). Its mission was to construct a railway from Seoul to Sinuiju (신의주,新義州) without the help from foreign countries. This department later became the Korail, or the Korea Railroad Corporation (한국철도공사,韓國鐵道公社).
- On 2 December 1899, first urban rail transit was built in Hansung, which connected Jongno District to Namdaemun. In January 1900, it was lengthen to Yongsan District.
- 1900: January. Korean Empire became a member of the Universal Postal Union.
- 1900: January. First mail of Korea was sent.
- 1900: April. Construction of streetlamps on Jong-ro, Seoul. The Korean Empire opens its own exhibition pavilion in the Exposition Universelle of Paris.

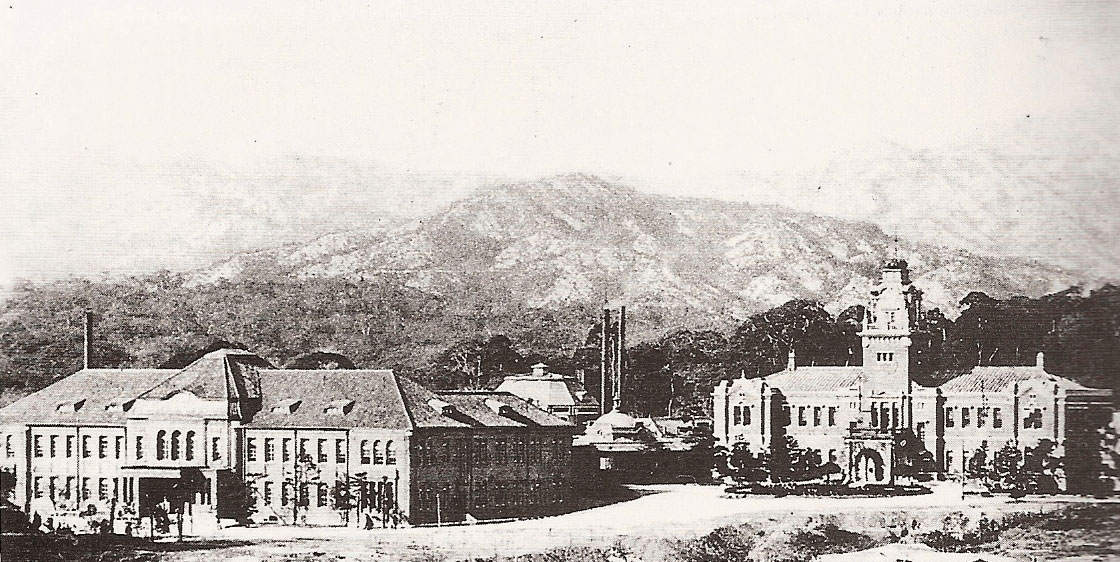
The Dae-han National hospital, the first national hospital opened in Korea

- 1900: July. Seoul-Incheon railroad opened with completion of the Han River Bridge (한강철교,漢江鐵橋). The bridge later becomes part of the Hangang Railway Bridge. It is still in operation.
- 1900: October. The Hanseung Secondary School (한성중학교,漢城中學校) was finished construction. It is the predecessor of Kyunggi High School (경기고등학교,京畿高等學校), one of the best high schools in Korea.
- 1901: February. Proclamation of ordinances for the new currency (adoption of the Gold Standard). Franz Eckert arrived to Seoul for establishment of the Korean Imperial Marching Band. He composed the Korean Imperial National Anthem. It is to be noted he also composed the Kimigayo, the Japanese counterpart.
- 1901: March. The Belgium–Korea Treaty of 1901 (조백수호통상조약,朝白修好通商條約) is signed by Jae-sun Park (박제순,朴齊純), delegate of the Korean Empire and Leon Vincart, the Belgian counterpart. It is notable the treaty was not terminated, unlike many others after the Korea-Japanese 1905 Treaty.
- 1901: October. Inauguration of the Jigye Ahmun (지계아문,地契衙門), a system to issue legal documents of property ownership (지계,地契). It marks the start of a modern cadastral survey project.

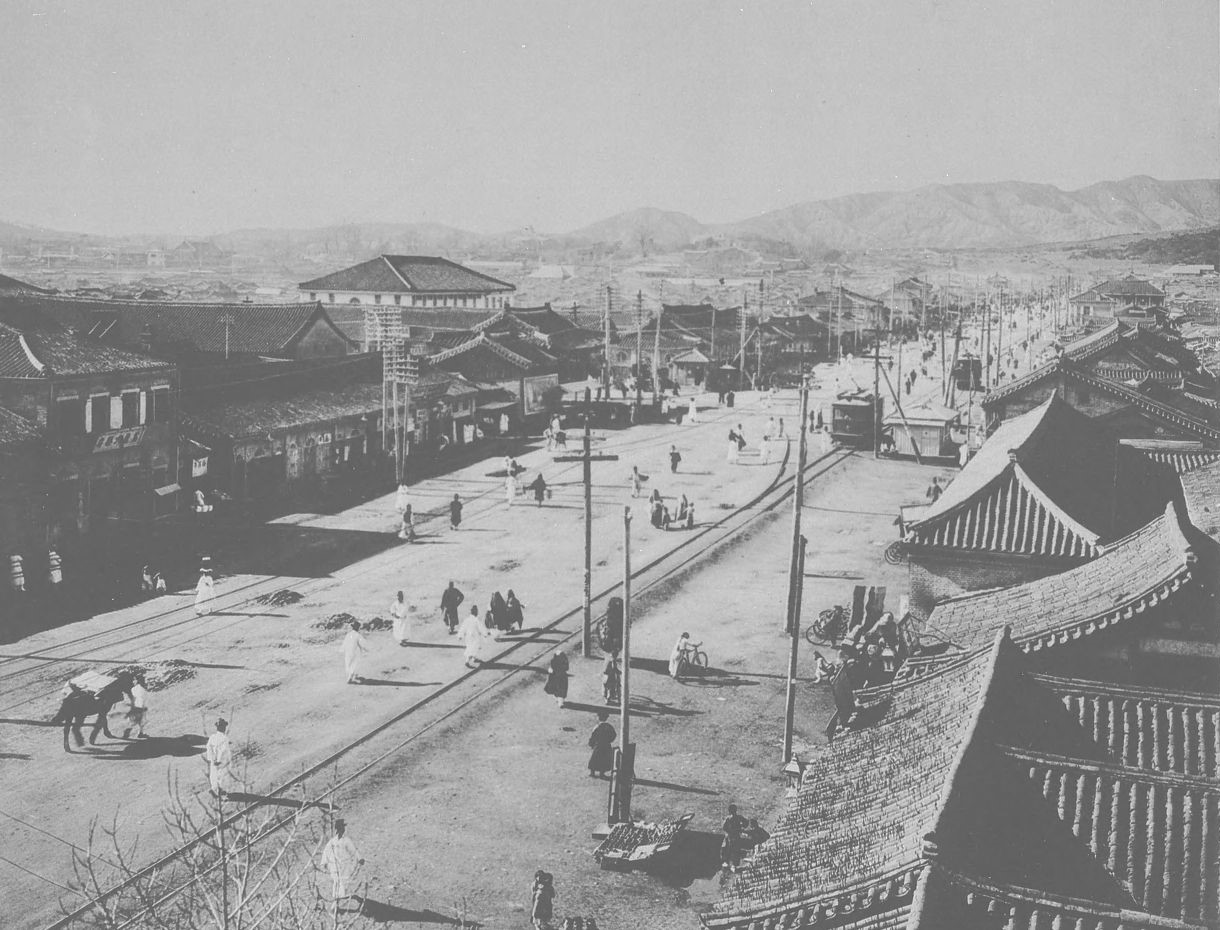
The modernisation of Seoul and its effects.

- 1902: March. Embarkment of construction upon the Seoul-Gaesung line, Dispatch of government officials with jurisdiction over Gando (간도,間島)
- 1902: May, first graduation of Medical School of Korean Empire. One of the first
- 1902: December. First immigration of 100 Koreans to Hawaii. After the 102 immigrants who arrived into Honolulu Harbor, the number of Koreans in Hawaii exploded to 7,000 within 2 years.
- 1903: January. The Korean Empire became member of the International Committee of the Red Cross.
- 1903: February. Establishment of the Hanseung Bank (한성은행,漢城銀行). It is the present-day Shinhan Bank (신한은행,新韓銀行), one of the most prominent banks in Korea.
- 1903: April. The Mitsui Corporation (三井グループ) sold a battleship to the Korean Empire for 250,000 Won. The ship, which was a reconstructed cargo ship for military usage, was a slapdash product by the Japanese and was extremely inefficient. The battleship was christened "KIS Yangmu" (양무호,楊武號), which means 'Growing the strength of a Nation'.
- 1903: December. Collbran and Bostwick started construction of the Ttuk Island freshwater reservoir. The reservoir is still being used as the Ttuk Island Drainage basin 1 reservoir (뚝도수원지제1정수장,--水源地第一淨水場).
- 1904: March. The first meteorological observatories were constructed in Mokpo and various other places.
- 1904: July. The establishment of the Korean Daily News (대한매일신보,大韓每日申報). It is now the Seoul Shinmun, the oldest newspaper still operating in Korea.
- 1904: September. Jejungwon hospital in Seoul, was renamed Severance Hospital, added Severance Hospital Medical School and the attached School of Nursing.

The Korean imperial battleship, KIS Gwangje

- 1904: November. The Pre-dreadnought battleship KIS Gwangje (광제호,光濟號) started operation in Incheon, Korea. It had a displacement of 1,056 tonnes. Its full speed was 14.77 knots with 2483 horsepower. The engine was a triple-expansion steam engine. The battleship and was made by Kawasaki Shipbuilding Corporation (川崎造船) and was given the mission for patrolling the Western Korean maritime territory. It is also the first Korean battleship to be equipped with the wireless telegraph.
- 1905: June. the Taft–Katsura Agreement- America recognized Korea as Japanese territory and Japanese recognized Philippines as American territory.

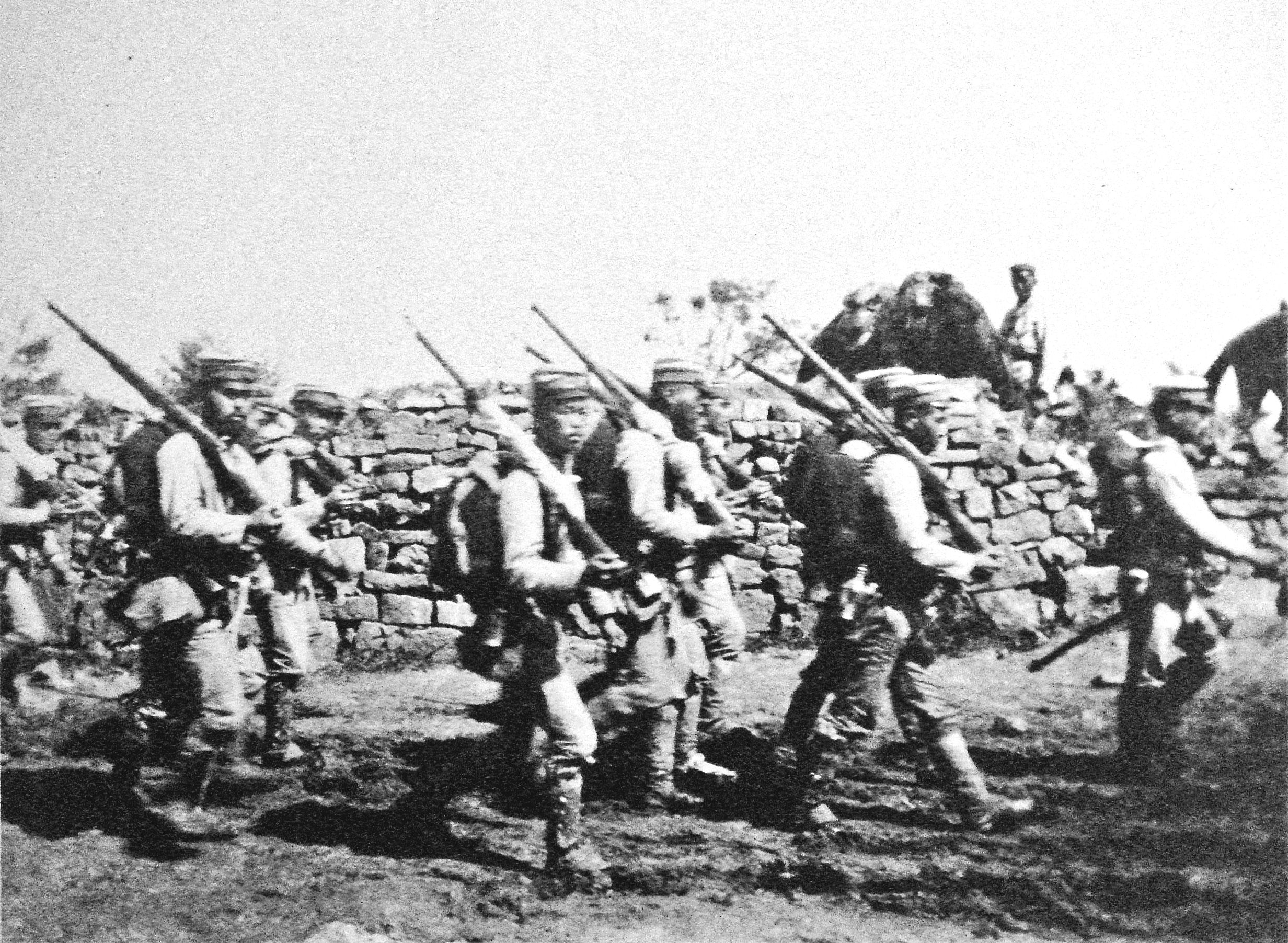
Japanese soldiers near Incheon, Korea during the Russo-Japanese War.

- 1905: May. Yi Yong-ik (이용익,李容翊), Secretary of the Imperial Treasury, established Bosung College (보성학교,普成學校), later to be known as the Korea University (고려대학교,高麗大學校).
- 1905: June. 30 merchants establish the Hanseung Chamber of Commerce (한성상무회의소,漢城商務會議所), the first of its kind in Korea. The first president of the association was Kim gi-yeung (김기영,金基永). They also operated the Commerce Monthly (상공월보,商工月報), which was the first business journal.
- 1905: November. Japan declared Korea a protectorate after success at the Russo-Japanese War. Japan forced Korea to sign the Eulsa Treaty (을사조약,乙巳條約), for formalisation of its sphere of influence around the Korean Peninsula.

== Japanese interventions and annexation of Korea (1905–10) ==
This was the darkest period of the Gwangmu Reform, ending with the annexation of Korea by Japan on the 29th of August, 1910.

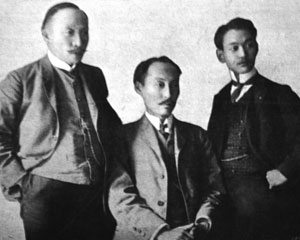
The Hague Secret Emissary.

- 1906: January. Yi Yong-ik, former Secretary of the Imperial Treasury, is assassinated in Vladivostok, Russia.
- 1907: June. The Hague Secret Emissary Affair (헤이그 특사 사건,海牙特使事件) was initiated by Emperor Gojong and carried by Sang-sul Yi (이상설,李相卨), Jun Yi (이준,李儁), Wi-jong Yi (이위종,李瑋鍾) and Homer Hulbert. Gojong initiated this by a confidential invitation from the former Russian Tsar, Nicholas II. While Hulbert lured the Japanese spies into the wrong path, the three Koreans went to the Hague conference. However, they were blocked by the Japanese for the reasons that they were not nation-states even though they were on the list of invitation. Undaunted, they sought for interest of the press and found hope. Two notable figures they gained attention of are Bertha von Suttner and William Thomas Stead.

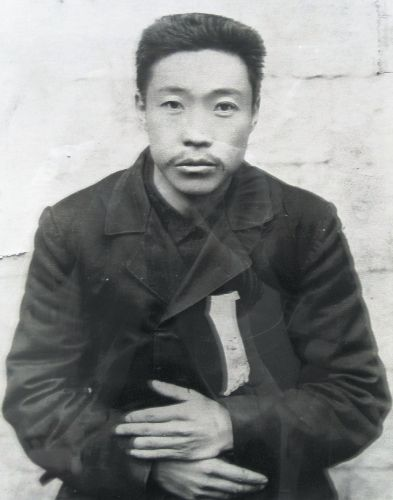
An Jung-geun, Lieutenant-general of the Korean Imperial Army.

- 1907: July 18. Gojong was forced to abdicate in favour of his son, Sunjong.
- 1907: July 24. The Japan–Korea Treaty of 1907 (한일신협약,韓日新協約) is enforced by Japan. It states that the Korean Empire would act under guidance of the Japanese Resident-General, and have also lost its diplomatic rights as a protectorate.
- 1908: March. Durham Stevens, a former employee of Japan's Ministry of Foreign Affairs, is assassinated by Jang In-hwan (장인환,張仁煥) and Jeon Myeong-un (전명운,田明雲) in San Francisco for his active participation and support upon the Japanese presence coming into the Korean government.
- 1909: September. Gando is reclaimed by China after the Sino-Japanese convention over Gando (간도협약,間島協約).
- 1909: October. Ito Hirobumi (the first Resident-General) is assassinated by Korean Lieutenant-General An Jung-geun (안중근,安重根). This incident was dramatized in the recent Korean musical, Hero (영웅,英雄). The musical premiered in Lincoln Center for the Performing Arts on August 23, 2011.
- 1910: August. The Japan–Korea Treaty of 1910 started the annexation of the Korean Empire by Japan.

== General references ==
- Bird, Isabella L. Korea and Her Neighbors a Narrative of Travel, with an Account of the Recent Vicissitudes and Present Position of the Country. New York: Revell, 1898. Print.
- Chung, K. (1910–2004). History of Korean Empire Vol. 9. Seoul, Korea: Somyung. ISBN 89-5626-094-X
- Ito, Y. (2009). Ito Hirobumi - A man who modernized Japan. Tokyo, Japan: Kodansha. ISBN 4-06-215909-0.
- Jansen, M. B. (1961). Sakamoto Ryoma and the Meiji Restoration. Stanford, CA: Stanford University Press. ISBN 0-8047-0785-5
- Beasley, William G. (1987). Japanese Imperialism, 1894-1945. Oxford: Oxford University Press. ISBN 9780198215752 OCLC 14719443
- Carnegie Endowment for International Peace, Division of International Law. (1921). Pamphlet 43: "Korea, Treaties and Agreements." The Endowment: Washington, D.C. OCLC 1644278
- Clare, Israel Smith; Hubert Howe Bancroft and George Edwin Rines. (1910). Library of universal history and popular science. New York: The Bancroft society. OCLC 20843036
- Cordier, Henri and Edouard Chavannes. (1905). "Traité entre le Japon et la Corée," Revue internationale de Sinologie (International Journal of Chinese studies). Leiden: E. J. Brill. OCLC 1767648
- Duus, Peter (1995). The Abacus and the Sword: The Japanese Penetration of Korea, 1895-1910. Berkeley: University of California Press. ISBN 9780520086142. OCLC 232346524.
- Korean Mission to the Conference on the Limitation of Armament, Washington, D.C., 1921-1922. (1922). Korea's Appeal to the Conference on Limitation of Armament. Washington: U.S. Government Printing Office. OCLC 12923609
- Pak, Chʻi-yŏng. (2000). Korea and the United Nations. The Hague: Kluwer Law International. ISBN 9789041113825; OCLC 247402192
- United States. Dept. of State. (1919). Catalogue of treaties: 1814-1918. Washington: Government Printing Office. OCLC 3830508
- Kang, J. (2007). Modern history of Korea Vol.5. Seoul, Korea: Inmulgwa Sasang. ISBN 978-89-5906-075-7
- Korean Mission to the Conference on the Limitation of Armament, Washington, D.C., 1921-1922. (1922). Korea's Appeal to the Conference on Limitation of Armament. Washington: U.S. Government Printing Office. OCLC 12923609
- United States. Dept. of State. (1919). Catalogue of treaties: 1814-1918. Washington: Government Printing Office. OCLC 3830508
- Kim, G. (1928/1997). Baekbeomilji. Seoul, Korea: Hakminsa. ISBN 89-7193-086-1
- Nam, K. (1999). History of Eastern Asia Seoul, Korea: Greenbee. ISBN 89-7682-051-7
- Ravina, M. (2004). The last samurai: The life and battles of Saigo Takamori. Hoboken, NJ: John Wiley & Sons. ISBN 0-471-08970-2
- Genthe, Siegfried. Genthes Reisen. Berlin: Allg. Verein Für Deutsche Literatur, 1905. Print.
- Rossetti, Carlo. Corea E Coreani: Impressioni E Ricerche Sull'impero Del Gran Han. Bergamo: Istituto Italiano D'Arti Grafiche, 1904. Print.
- An, Joo Yun. "The Korean Empire: a 13-year Plan." History Special. Dir. Jung Hoon Go. KBS. KBS1, Seoul, 22 Sept. 2006. Television.
- Hummel, Arthur W. Sr., ed. (1943). "Index" . Eminent Chinese of the Ch'ing Period. United States Government Printing Office.
- Liu, Kwang-ching. "The Confucian as Patriot and Pragmatist: Li Hung-Chang's Formative Years, 1823–1866." Harvard Journal of Asiatic Studies 30 (1970): 5–45.
- Liang Qichao,"Biography of Li Hongzhang"
- Mutsu, Munemitsu. (1982). Kenkenroku (trans. Gordon Mark Berger). Tokyo: University of Tokyo Press. ISBN 9780860083061; OCLC 252084846
- Yi, Tʻae-jin, Chae-ho Kim, Hyun-Jong Wang, Gi-bong Kim, Dong-taek Kim, Young hun Yi, Jin-oh Ju, Sang-gyu Kang, Young-hei Seo, Hun-chang Yi, and Byung chun Yi. Kojong Hwangje Yŏksa Chʻŏngmunhoe. Comp. The Kyosu Shinmoon. Sŏul-si: Pʻurŭn Yŏksa, 2005. Print.
- Millard, Thomas F. The New Far East an Examination into the New Position of Japan ... London: Hodder & Stoughton, 1906. Print.
- Yang, Sang Hyun. The Management of Military Budget and Military Reform of the Korean Empire. Thesis. Ulsan University, 2007. Print.
