= Ok (Korean name) =

Ok (Korean: 옥), sometimes spelled Oak or Ock, is an uncommon Korean family name and a Korean given name.

== Family name ==
The 2000 South Korean census found 22,964 people and 7,288 households with the family name Ok (玉). The surviving bongwan (origin of a clan lineage, not necessarily the actual residence of the clan members) at that time included:

- Uiryeong County, South Gyeongsang Province: 19,368 people and 6,157 households
- Geoje, South Gyeongsang Province: 1,085 people and 345 households
- Kaesong, North Hwanghae Province: 708 people and 232 households
- Miryang, South Gyeongsang Province: 537 people and 174 households
- Jinju, South Gyeongsang Province: 441 people and 145 households
- Uiseong County, North Gyeongsang Province: 467 people and 138 households
- Sacheon, South Gyeongsang Province: 197 people and 61 households
- Other or unknown: 161 people and 36 households

In a study by the National Institute of the Korean Language based on 2007 application data for South Korean passports, it was found that 84.8% of people with this family name spelled it in Latin letters as Ok in their passports, while another 9.0% spelled it as Ock. Rarer alternative spellings (the remaining 6.2%) included Oak and Ohk.

People with this family name include:

- Simon Ok Hyun-jin (born 1968), South Korean Roman Catholic priest, Auxiliary Bishop of the Archdiocese of Gwangju
- Ok Ja-yeon (born 1988), South Korean actress
- Ock Joo-hyun (born 1980), South Korean singer, former member of Fin.K.L
- Justine Ok, Korean-American artist and songwriter
- Ok Kwan-bin (died 1933), Korean independence activist
- Ok So-ri (born 1968), South Korean actress
- Ok Taec-yeon (born 1988), South Korean singer, member of boyband 2PM

== Given name ==
People with the given name Ok include:

- Yeo Ok, poet of the Gojoseon Kingdom which fell in 108 BC
- Jeon Ok (1911–1969), South Korean actress
- Kim Ok (born 1964), North Korean government employee, personal secretary to Kim Jong-il

== See also ==
- List of Korean family names
- List of Korean given names
