= Carroll Cook =

American judge

- Cook c. 1892
- Born: January 15, 1855; San Francisco, California
- Died: January 8, 1915 (aged 59); San Francisco, California
- Occupations: Lawyer, judge

Carroll Cook (January 15, 1855 – January 8, 1915) was an attorney and judge for the Superior Court of San Francisco. He was best known for the national attention drawn to some of his rulings in famous cases, several of which were upheld by the United States Supreme Court.

== Cases ==
Judge Cook, in the case of Cordelia Botkin, made the first decision for a crime committed in two different states, Delaware and California. The defendant received a life sentence, a ruling upheld by the United States Supreme Court. In a case known as the "Gas Pipe Thugs" Judge Cook sentenced a defendant who pleaded guilty to hanging without a jury trial, a sentence that the Appellate Court upheld. He also sentenced to death the medical student Theodore Durrant, who was convicted in November 1895 for the murder of two young women nine days apart in a church. These became known as the "belfry murders". The defendant unsuccessfully appealed his sentence repeatedly during the three years before his eventual hanging in 1898. Carroll also presided over the 1908 trial of Jang In-hwan for the murder of former diplomat Durham Stevens.

As an attorney, Cook defended John McNulty, on his appeal of his death penalty sentence, for whom the gallows was erected eight separate times. Cook stayed the execution and, taking the case to the U.S. Supreme Court, had the sentence reduced to six years in prison.

Carroll Cook died in San Francisco on January 8, 1915.
