= Imperial Naval Academy =

Imperial Naval Academy may refer to:

== Historical ==
- German Imperial Naval Academy
- Japanese Imperial Naval Academy
- Korean Imperial Naval Academy

== Fiction ==
- Imperial Naval Academy of the Galactic Empire of the Star Wars universe
