= Kim Myeong-sik =

Korean writer and activist (1890–1943)

- Hangul: 김명식
- Hanja: 金明植
- RR: Gim Myeongsik
- MR: Kim Myŏngsik

Art name
- Hangul: 송산
- Hanja: 松山
- RR: Songsan
- MR: Songsan

Kim Myeong-sik (Korean: 김명식; September 26, 1890 – April 11, 1943) was a Korean independence activist and writer during the period of Japanese occupation. He joined the editorial committee of the Donga Ilbo in 1920. In the same year, he formed the Korean Workers' League (노동공제회) with others including Pak Jung-hwa and Jang Deok-su and published the league magazine Gongje. In 1922, he was arrested and imprisoned for two years by the Japanese government, due to his involvement with the magazine New Life (신생활) which was managed by Pak Hui-do.

== See also ==
- Korean literature
- Korea under Japanese rule
- List of Korean independence activists
