= Jung Nosik =

Korean independence activist (1891–1965)

Jung Nosik (Korean: 정노식; Hanja: 鄭魯湜; 1891 – 1965) was a Korean independence activist, socialist activist, and Pansori researcher. During the March 1st Movement, he participated in the socialist movement with 48 national representatives, worked in the Workers' Party of South Korea after Korea's liberation from Japanese colonial rule, and defected to North Korea, serving as vice chairman of the National Front for Democracy and the Central Committee for Democratic Front for the Reunification of Korea

== Biography ==
Jung Nosik, a native of Mangyeong-myeon, Gimje, North Jeolla Province, graduated from Yeongmyeong School in Gimje in 1910 and entered the Korean Central Christian Youth Center. He moved to Japan, graduated from Seisoku English School in 1912, and dropped out of the Department of Political Economy at Meiji University. In 1915, he organized a secret association with Chang Deok-soo and Kim Chul-soo, and in 1916, formed the Shinah Alliance with activists from China and Taiwan. In 1918, he joined the Joseon Students' Association and became a member of the council and became a subject of inspection by the Japanese police. In January 1919, he dispatched Yi Gwang-su to Beijing to contact the elderly independence fighter in U.S., China's Gando and Shanghai. He was arrested for participating as 48 national representatives during March 1st Movement and was found not guilty in the second trial, but served up nearly two years in prison for non-conviction.

Later in 1920, he participated in the Socialist Revolutionary Party in Seoul.In May 1921, he was appointed as a senior official at the founding meeting of the Korean Communist Party in Shanghai, China, and became the executive chairman of the Korean Youth Association in 1922, and was a member of the screening committee when Kim Sa-guk, Lee Young, and Han Shin-kyo founded the General Association of Korean Youths in 1924.

In 1923, he served as a member of the accounting department of the Joseon Society for the Promotion of Public Works and as a member of the executive committee of the Association for the Advancement of Private Universities.

In February 1946, Lyuh Woon-hyung, Ho Hon, Pak Hon-yong, and Kim Won-bong, the central executive and finance director of the Democratic National Front, vice chairman and standing committee members, and vice chairman of the Central Committee of the South Korean New Democratic Party in July, attended as a chairman when the Workers' Party of South Korea was formed in November, and was appointed as a central commerce committee member and cooperation director in December.

He defected to North Korea in 1948 and served as a first-term delegate to the Supreme People's Assemblyin the Democratic People's Republic of Korea, a member of the Standing Committee of the Democratic Front for the Reunification of Korea in June 1949, and a chairman. After the Korean War, he became a member of the Central Inspection Committee of the Workers' Party in 1956 and a member of the 2nd Supreme People's Assembly and a member of the Standing Committee in 1957. He was appointed vice-chairman of the National People's Committee for Peace and Protection in 1958 and central member of Committee for the Peaceful Reunification of the Fatherland in 1961.

He died around 1965.
