= Korean Imperial Naval Academy =

1893–1895 college in Korea

Korean Imperial Navy Academy (Tongjaeyonghakdang)
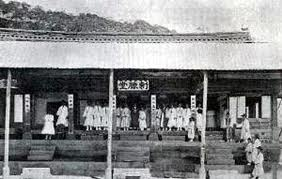
- Ganghwa Island

Information
- Established: 1893
- Faculty: W.D.Hutchison, W. H. Callwell, J. W. Curtis
- Grades: 18-26
- Enrollment: 350
- Disestablished: 1895
- Establishment Cost: 1000 Korean Won

The Korean Imperial Navy Academy, or the Tongjaeyonghakdang (통제영학당, 統制營學堂) was established by the Joseon Dynasty. In British and American records, it was also known as the Royal Naval Academy or The Navy School.

The 1000 Won for the establishment was borrowed from China. The construction took place in Ganghwa Island, which was the main region of foreign attacks upon Korea, such as the American expedition to Korea in 1871, the Japanese expedition to Korea in 1875, and the French expedition to Korea in 1866. It was a part of the bigger plan during the Gwangmu Reform. The academy produced about 160 officers until its closure during the First Sino-Japanese War.
