= An Pongsun =

Korean independence activist (1894–1967)

- Born: March 1, 1894
- Died: February 25, 1967 (aged 72)

Korean name
- Hangul: 안봉순
- Hanja: 安奉舜
- RR: An Bongsun
- MR: An Pongsun
- IPA: an.boŋsun

An Pongsun (Korean: 안봉순; Hanja: 安奉舜; pronounced [an.boŋsun]; March 1, 1894 – February 25, 1967) was a Korean independence activist. He was a member of the Korean Provisional Government and of the Korean Liberation Army.

He posthumously received the Order of Merit for National Foundation in 1977.
