= Jang In-hwan =

Korean independence activist (1875–1930)

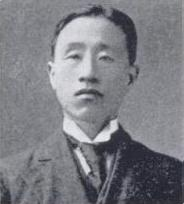
- Jang in 1907
- Born: March 30, 1875; Pyongyang, Korea
- Died: April 24, 1930 (aged 55); San Francisco, California, United States
- Cause of death: Suicide
- Known for: Assassinating Durham Stevens
- Status: Deceased
- Conviction: Second degree murder
- Penalty: 25 years imprisonment

Korean name
- Hangul: 장인환
- Hanja: 張仁煥
- RR: Jang Inhwan
- MR: Chang Inhwan

Jang In-hwan (Korean: 장인환; March 30, 1875 – April 24, 1930) was a Korean independence activist. He is best known along with Jeon Myeong-un for his role in the 1908 assassination of Durham Stevens, a former American diplomat, employee of the Japanese colonial office in Korea, and pro-Japan lobbyist.

== Incident ==
Jang, a Christian, emigrated from Korea to Hawaii in February 1905, and from there to the continental United States in August 1906. He became involved with the Korean independence movement while living there, and joined the Daedong Bogukhoe. In March 1908, infuriated by Stevens' remarks about Japanese rule in Korea, the Daedong Bogukhoe held a joint meeting with the Dongnip Hyeophoe, another local association of Koreans of which Jeon was a member. Yang Ju-eun, a fellow member of the association, recalled in a 1974 interview that Jang, in contrast to Jeon, did not say a single word during that meeting; Jang had a reputation as a "quiet and shy Christian gentleman." However, he purchased a gun from his roommate in order to circumvent laws which prevented Asians from owning guns.

On March 23, 1908, Jeon and Jang approached Stevens at the Port of San Francisco as he prepared to embark on a ferry to Oakland to make a rail connection to Washington, D.C. Jeon fired his revolver at Stevens first, but missed, and instead rushed at him, using his weapon as a club to hit Stevens in the face. Jang then accidentally fired into the melee, striking Stevens twice in the back; Jeon was also shot in the confusion. The crowd which had gathered urged that they be lynched on the spot; Jang was arrested and held without bail on a charge of murder, while Jeon was sent to the hospital for treatment. He received news of Stevens' death two days later with "manifest delight".

== Trial ==
Because there was insufficient evidence to prove that Jeon and Jang had conspired with each other, Jeon was released in June, and Jang ordered to stand trial as the sole defendant. The Korean community, viewing the case as a chance to validate their claims of oppressions by Japan in Korea, hired three lawyers to defend Jang, among whom one, Nathan Coughlan, eventually agreed to take on the case pro bono. During the trial, he planned to use Arthur Schopenhauer's theory of "patriotic insanity" to argue that Jang was not guilty by reason of insanity. Jang's trial was originally scheduled to begin on July 27 in the San Francisco Superior Court. However, on the day of the trial, presiding judge Carroll Cook held a conference in chambers with Coughlan and several members of the Korean community, as a result of which the trial was delayed by one month.

During Jang's trial, the defense described Japan's subordination of Korea in great detail. According to press reports, several members of the all-white jury were moved to tears. The prosecution reminded the jury that Jang, not Japan, was on trial. They presented four experts in psychiatric disorders, all of whom testified that Jang was not insane when he shot Stevens, and had been feigning insanity during the proceedings. Nevertheless, the jurors were divided on Jang's fate. While none of them were willing to acquit him outright, only three of the jurors wanted to convict him of first degree murder. Five wanted to convict him of second degree murder, and the remaining four wanted to convict him of manslaughter. Eventually, on December 23, 1908, the jurors agreed to find Jang guilty of second degree murder. At sentencing, Jang himself requested to the judge through an interpreter to change his sentence to death, a request which was not possible under the law.

"I do not want to live if I am to be sent to prison for a long time. If sent to prison, I will do nothing but weep for my country's wrong. I do not want to live. I wanted to give up my life for my country. I am only a poor man, but I want to die, and I love Korea."

Jang was sentenced to 25 years in prison. He served his sentence at San Quentin State Prison, and was released on parole in 1919, having served 10 years. Jang was repatriated to Korea in 1927, where he attended the wedding of Cho Man-sik and established an orphanage in Sonchon, North Pyongan Province. However, under pressure from the Japanese government of Korea, he returned to the United States. An impoverished and broken man, Jang committed suicide in San Francisco in 1930, and was buried there.

Jang was posthumously awarded the Order of Merit for National Foundation by South Korea's Ministry of Patriots' and Veterans' Affairs in 1962. In 1975, South Korean president Park Chung Hee ordered that he be reburied in the Seoul National Cemetery.
