= Jeong Jeong-hwa =

Korean independence activist (1900–1991)

- Born: August 3, 1900; Seoul, Korean Empire
- Died: November 2, 1991 (aged 91)
- Relatives: Kim Eui Han (Husband)
- Awards: Order of Merit for National Foundation (1982)

Jeong Jeong-hwa (Korean: 정정화; August 3, 1900 – November 2, 1991) was a Korean independence activist of the Japanese occupation period. She worked as a fundraiser for more than a decade, taking the role of raising funds for the provisional government's independence movement.

In addition, during her 27 years exiled in China, she took care of temporary government agents such as Lee Dong-nyeong and Kim Gu. She also supported the provisional government to continue its independence movement.

She left her memoir, "The Green Bean Flower," and the revised edition of "Janggang Diary." Based on this memoir, the play "Janggang Diary", "Cheerma" and "Ah! Jeong" Jeong-hwa's life-long play was performed.

She was awarded the Order of Merit for National Foundation in 1982.
