= Justine Ok =

Korean-American artist and songwriter

- Also known as: Justine, Justine OK, SimplyJustine, 저스틴, 저스틴 옥, 옥미나
- Born: Justine Mina Ok
- Origin: Chicago, United States
- Occupations: songwriter, singer, rapper, producer. print model
- Labels: Sony/ATV Publishing, Warner Chappell
- Website: Fiera Music Official website

Justine Ok is a Korean-American artist and songwriter (signed to Sony/ATV Publishing). Her most well-known work to date as a songwriter is the Korean pop song "Good Boy" by Baek Ji-young ft. Yong Jun-hyung of B2ST, which hit Billboard No. 4 upon release and stayed in the top 10 for over 6 weeks. Justine Ok is the CEO and founder of Fiera Music and also holds the current title of chief operating officer for Joombas Music Group. She has worked with established producers that have written songs for major recording artists such as Britney Spears, Kelly Clarkson, Jennifer Lopez, Alicia Keys, and Justin Bieber international superstars such as Korean singer, BoA, and popular K-pop groups such as 2NE1, Girls’ Generation, f(x), EXO, SHINee.

== Careers ==
- South Korea

Justine has co-written "Good Boy" by Baek Ji-young ft. Young Jun-hyung of B2ST which made an "All-Kill", a term meaning it reached No. 1 simultaneously across on South Korean digital music charts at the time of release. "Good Boy" was written and produced in a collaboration with Fiera Music and Doubleside Kick. "Good Boy" entered the K-Pop Billboard Charts No. 4 and stayed in the top 10 for over 6 weeks. Justine has also co-written and performed "Can't Stop the Sunrise" on the Korean original motion picture Star, Shining Love soundtrack in collaboration with Kimjee She wrote and performed the commercial jingle for Dionys which is a national bar and grill restaurant chain in Korea.

- Portugal

In Portugal, Justine has also worked with Portuguese recording artists, Romana, No. 1 a popular singer and a reality TV star, writing for the single "Redeemed" which hit Portugal Top 10 Radio Charts in 2013 and also executive producing and writing for recording artist, Alia Clark. An editorial by Miguel Azevedo, music journalist for Portuguese publication 'Vidas' has glowingly described Justine as "one of the most promising writers, composers, and producers of today."

- Taiwan

In Taiwan, Justine co-wrote ‘都會好的’ (Will Be OK) "Dou Hui Hao De" on Jess Lee’s 2nd album. The album 天堂/懸崖 (Heaven/Cliff) was released from Warner Music on March 17, 2014 and went directly to No. 1 on iTunes Taiwan and KKBox. Jess Lee is finalist and grand winner of the popular televised singing competition One Million Star (7th Season) in Taiwan.

- Malaysia

Justine co-wrote the theme song "Proud To Change" for the motion picture Bullets Over Petaling Street, released in theatres in Malaysia on February 13, 2014. The song "Proud To Change" was performed by the cast of the film. The cast of the firm include Debbie Goh, Chen Han Wei, Irene Ang, Jeffrey Cheng, KK Wong, Steve Yap, Cheryl Lee and the film was directed by Sampson Yuen.

- United States

Other noteworthy artists Justine has also written for include Asia Cruise, Nash Overstreet of Hot Chelle Rae, and Natascha Bessez. As Justine was songwriting for Miss Teen New York and YouTube star, Natascha Bessez, she introduced her to Kayla J.Yoo which eventually led to the music video featuring Hunter Johansson, twin brother of Scarlett Johansson.

- Worldwide

On January 28, 2014, the single, "Champion" with Born I Music and Justine was released and distributed worldwide by Fiera Music / Sony Music Entertainment Korea. This hiphop soul driven single was the first recording to showcase a rap performance by Justine. Music critic Bluc from HiphopLE was quoted stating, " Both artists have a fresh quality about their vocals. Especially in the way they weave between melody and rap with stability and effortlessness, a synergistic effect is created which demonstrates the patient inner workings of craft building by Born's and the powerful new artist that is Justine." Undergrounddiva.com described Champion as "the right balance of upbeat tempo and encouraging words to refuel your ambition and focus.” Subsequently, "Champion" was also featured in a Sony Music compilation album for the Sochi 2014 Olympics released on February 7, 2014. Also listed on the album were artists such as Pharrell Williams, Daft Punk, Justin Timberlake, Lenka, Avril Lavigne, Shakira, Pitbull, One Direction, Dami Im, Britney Spears, Chris Brown, Miley Cyrus, Foster The People, Paloma Faith, Helena, Tinashe, Krewella, Little Mix, Beyoncé, Russian Red, Justice Crew, Ailee, and Lucas Nord. Justine announced her plans for a "Rap Project EP" on Kickstarter, for which funding ended successfully with over 63 pledged backers. On the Kickstarter page, the "Rap Project EP" is slated for June 2014. She describes the musical sound to be a "fascinating blend of pop/R&B/hiphop/dance/electro".

Justine holds a degree in Songwriting from the Berklee College of Music and also a B.A. in Speech Communication from the University of Illinois at Urbana-Champaign. She has also been involved in a diverse range of other activities such as children's songs; hosting live college radio; print modeling; and making appearances in MTV music videos.
