= Nam Ja-hyeon =

Korean independence activist (1872–1933)

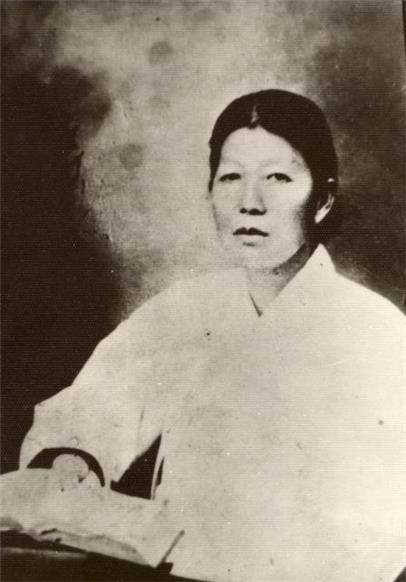
- Born: 7 December 1872; Andong, Gyeongsang Province, Joseon
- Died: 22 August 1933 (aged 60); Harbin, Manchukuo
- Known for: Female Korean independence activist in the March 1st Movement
- Awards: Order of Merit for National Foundation

Korean name
- Hangul: 남자현
- Hanja: 南慈賢
- RR: Nam Jahyeon
- MR: Nam Chahyŏn

Nam Ja-hyeon (Korean: 남자현; 7 December 1872 – 22 August 1933) was a Korean independence activist.

She participated in the March 1st Movement and went into exile to Manchuria, joined an independence revolution organization and carried out various independence movements, including an attempt to assassinate Japanese Governor-General of Korea, Makoto Saito. She is often compared to An Jung-geun, who assassinated Ito Hirobumi.

She was posthumously awarded the Order of Merit for National Foundation in 1962. The character in the 2015 film Assassination Ahn Ok-yoon was based on her.

== Early life ==
Nam was born on 7 December 1872 in Andong, Gyeonsangbuk-do, as the youngest daughter among one son and three daughters under his father, Nam Jeong-eun, and mother, Jin Sung-eun (the daughter of Lee Won-jun).

In 1891, around the time she turned 19, she married Kim Young-joo. Not long after the marriage, she lost her husband in a battle in 1896.

After her husband's death, Nam moved to Gye-dong, Suji-myeon, Yang-gun. There, she lived with her parents-in-law and raised her son Kim Seong-sam.

== Exile in China ==
In 1919, Nam defected to Manchuria and served independence revolution organization as well as promoted the spirit of independence by touring various organizations, military organizations, and farming and fishing villages that carried out the independence movement. She built churches and chapels in 12 places in Dongmanju and established women's education centers in 10 places to enlighten women.

In addition, she toured various parts of South Manchuria to promote unity among compatriots and raise funds for the independence movement. In 1924, she planned to assassinate Governor-General Saito with Chaechan and Lee Chung-san, but she returned to Manchuria after failing to do so.

At that time, Gileim residents' association president Lee Kyu-dong, Uiseongdan leader Pyeon Kang-ryul, Yang Gi-tak, and Son Il-min encouraged the unification of the activist groups, Nam actively contributed.

When 47 people, including Kim Dong-sam and Ahn Chang-ho, were arrested by Chinese police in Gillim in 1928, she nursed them and put all her energy into the campaign to release them. When Kim Dong-sam was captured in Harbin in 1931, she tried every possible means for him to escape, but did not succeed.

When the International Federation Ritten Investigation Team came to Harbin in 1932, she sent a letter written in blood titled "Korea Independent Institute" to the investigation team on a white towel to appeal for Korea's independence. In 1933, Nam was arrested by the Japanese police while passing Harbin suburb in disguise on a mission to contact her comrades and carrying weapons to assassinate Japanese ambassador Nobuyoshi Muto. She was 60 years old then.

== Death ==
Nam was released after six months of severe punishments on bail after a hunger strike. She soon died in Harbin, leaving the message: "Independence is in the spirit."

== Legacy and awards ==
Nam was awarded posthumously with the Presidential Medal of the Order of National Foundation in 1962. On 1 March 1962, the government awarded the Order of National Foundation Merit to 58 independence fighters, and Nam received the highest medal along with Lee Bong-chang and Shin Chae-ho.

Kim Si-ryeon, a former vice minister of the Ministry of Patriots and Veterans Affairs, is the grandson of Nam Sung-hyun.

Nam Ja-hyeon is often called the 'female An Jung-geun'. Lee Sang-guk, a poet who followed up Nam's life and author of a book titled, "Why did history erase Man-hyun?" said

"Her life's intense message is that at the age of 40, she suddenly took off the chisel of "a girl" and jumped into a death-defying struggle. Perhaps the reason she is looking so hard at us in that black-and-white photo is because of her desire to tell the truth no matter how passed the time? After her death, how many intellectuals and leaders turned their backs and changed their words...She walked the most self-transcendence life as a colonial woman."
