= Hague Secret Emissary Affair =

1907 attempt to prevent Korea's colonization by Japan

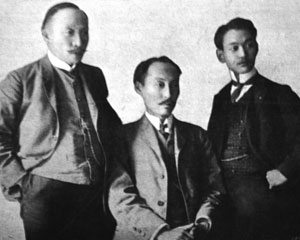
- Yi Tjoune, Yi Sang-seol, and Yi Wi-jong (from left)

Korean name
- Hangul: 헤이그 특사 사건
- Hanja: 헤이그 特使事件
- RR: Heigeu teuksa sageon
- MR: Heigŭ t'ŭksa sakŏn

The Hague Secret Emissary Affair (Korean: 헤이그 특사 사건) resulted from Emperor Gojong of the Korean Empire sending confidential emissaries to the Second Peace Conference at The Hague, the Netherlands, in 1907.

== Background ==
Throughout much of the late 19th Century, Korea had been caught in the crossfire of several conflicts between the more powerful nations of Japan, Russia, and China. Following the Empire of Japan's victory over Russia in the 1904–1905 Russo-Japanese War, Japan sought to formalize its control over the Korean Peninsula. It assumed hegemony over the Empire of Korea with the Eulsa Treaty of 1905. Korea claimed that the Eulsa treaty was illegal because it was signed under the threat of Japanese force without the approval of Emperor Gojong. The treaty took away Korea’s diplomatic rights and prevented the path to Korean autonomy that had been promised.

In 1905, a Korean party of Syngman Rhee and Byeong-gu Yun 윤병구; 尹炳求 traveled to the Portsmouth Conference in an attempt to invoke the good offices of the United States that were promised to them through the Joseon-United States Treaty of 1882. Article 1 of the treaty provides:

There shall be perpetual peace and friendship between the President of the United States and the King of Joseon and the citizens and subjects of their respective Governments. If other powers deal unjustly or oppressively with either Government, the other will exert their good offices on being informed of the case to bring about an amicable arrangement, thus showing their friendly feelings.

The party met with President Theodore Roosevelt, presenting a memorial that documented Japan’s mistreatment of Korea. However, this meeting did not result in any meaningful action because it was claimed that Yun and Rhee did not have any official diplomatic standing.

== Event ==
=== The Delegation ===
Emperor Gojong sent three secret emissaries, Yi Tjoune (이준, 李儁), Yi Sang-seol (이상설, 李相卨) and Yi Wi-jong (이위종, 李瑋鐘) to the Second Hague Peace Convention to declare the invalidity of Japanese diplomatic maneuvers, including the Japan–Korea Treaty of 1905 (Eulsa Treaty). The three representatives were handpicked for their different backgrounds and skills; Yi Tjoune was a judge, Yi Sang-seol was a former Korean government official, and Yi Wi-jong was a diplomat who had been educated in France and was fluent in seven languages, including French.

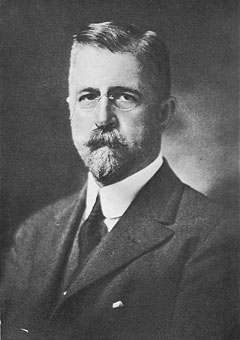
American diplomat Homer Hulbert was sent by Gojong to aid the Korean delegation at the Hague

American Homer Hulbert accompanied the emissaries, meeting with French and Russian consuls before the Korean delegation arrived at the conference to mediate.

=== Reception ===
Gojong's representatives asserted the monarch's rights to rule Korea independent of Japan. However, the nations at The Hague did not allow the emissaries to take part in the conference and blocked this diplomatic mission.

Because of Russia's opposition to Japan, Nicholas II of Russia tried to help the three Korean emissaries to enter the convention hall, though these efforts were ultimately blocked by Japan. Russian foreign minister Alexander Izvolsky rejected the request, as he had been a key figure involved in a push for Russian reconciliation with Japan. Izvolsky conveyed the message that the Russian provincial government had “strict orders not to deal with [the Koreans] at all”, and Russia had no intention of recognizing Korea’s representative status at the Hague Conference. Emperor Gojong's emissaries were unable to gain entry into the convention hall. Korea was no longer viewed as an independent nation by the nations, as Japan had assumed responsibility for its international representation.

=== The Cercle Internationale and Le Courrier de la Conference ===
After being turned away from the official Peace Conference, the Korean delegation remained in The Hague and connected with a community of international peace activists. They encountered a group called the Cercle Internationale (the International Circle), led by activist Bertha von Suttner. W.T. Stead reported on the nature of the forums and discussions hosted by the group:

“Baroness von Suttner twice a week holds receptions there, and twice a week meetings are held in the evening for the discussion of subjects relating to the Conference. These gatherings have been very well attended, not by delegates so much as by visitors who come to the Hague, and by the leading pacifists.”

Additionally, members of the Cercle Internationale were involved in the publishing of a newspaper, Le Courrier de la Conference, that reported on the events surrounding the Hague Conference. The newspaper published several stories about the Korean delegation and their attempt to gain access into the conference.

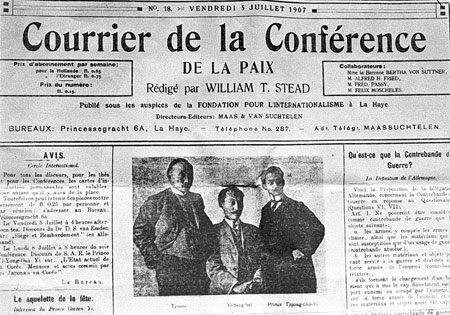
Image of a Le Courrier de la Conference newspaper, featuring a picture of the Korean delegation to the 1907 Hague Peace Conference

On July 8th, Yi Wi-jong delivered a speech before the International Circle, highlighting the plight of Korea and the cruelties the nation was subject to under Japanese occupation. This speech and the subsequent press it received in Le Courrier de la Conference were instrumental in raising awareness about Korea’s situation to an international community of peace activists. The International Circle voted to approve a resolution of “profound sympathy with Korea.” Noteworthy is that both during the Hague Peace Conference and in the events leading up to it the years before, the continuous attempts Korea made to appeal to the international community and obtain support were conducted using non-violent means and following the structure of existing international law.

=== In Korea ===
In Korea the throne of Gojong of Korea was threatened by the Pro-Japanese cabinet formed by Itō Hirobumi. Upon receiving word of the activities of the secret emissaries at the Hague, Hirobumi met with Emperor Gojong on July 3, comparing Gojong’s actions of sending the delegation to a declaration of war against Japan. Song Byeong-jun, the Minister of Agriculture, Commerce and Industry, requested that Gojong travel to Japan and apologize to Emperor Meiji or capitulate to Hasegawa Yoshimichi, the commander of Korean Residence Japanese Army. On the night of July 18, Foreign Minister Tadasu Hayashi arrived in Seoul on behalf of the Japanese government, removing Gojong from the throne and abdicating in favor of the Crown Prince.

== Rescission ==
In 1965, the treaties of Japan were confirmed to be "already null and void" by the Treaty on Basic Relations between Japan and the Republic of Korea.

In 2010, Japan argued that the chronological point of reference for "already null and void" was August 15, 1948, when the government of the Republic of Korea was established; but the Korean analysis of the 1965 declaration construes it as acknowledging the nullification of all treaties and agreements from 1904 onwards, which is consistent with the argument Yi Tjoune and others attempted to articulate in the Netherlands in 1907.

== See also ==
- Taft–Katsura Agreement
- Japan–Korea Treaty of 1905
- Japan–Korea Treaty of 1907
- Japan–Korea Treaty of 1910
