= Fred A. Dolph =

American lawyer (1871–1926)

- Born: 1871; December 29, 1926 (aged 54–55)

Fred A. Dolph (1871 – December 29, 1926) was an American lawyer and Korean independence activist.

In June 1919, Dolph was appointed a legal advisor to the Provisional Government of the Republic of Korea by its president, Syngman Rhee (who later became the first President of South Korea). Dolph repeatedly urged the United States to advocate for the independence of Korea, which was then a colony of the Empire of Japan. He died on December 29, 1926. For his contributions to the Korean independence movement, in 1950, South Korea awarded him the Order of Merit for National Foundation.
