= Sŏng Chusik =

Korean independence activist (1891–1959)

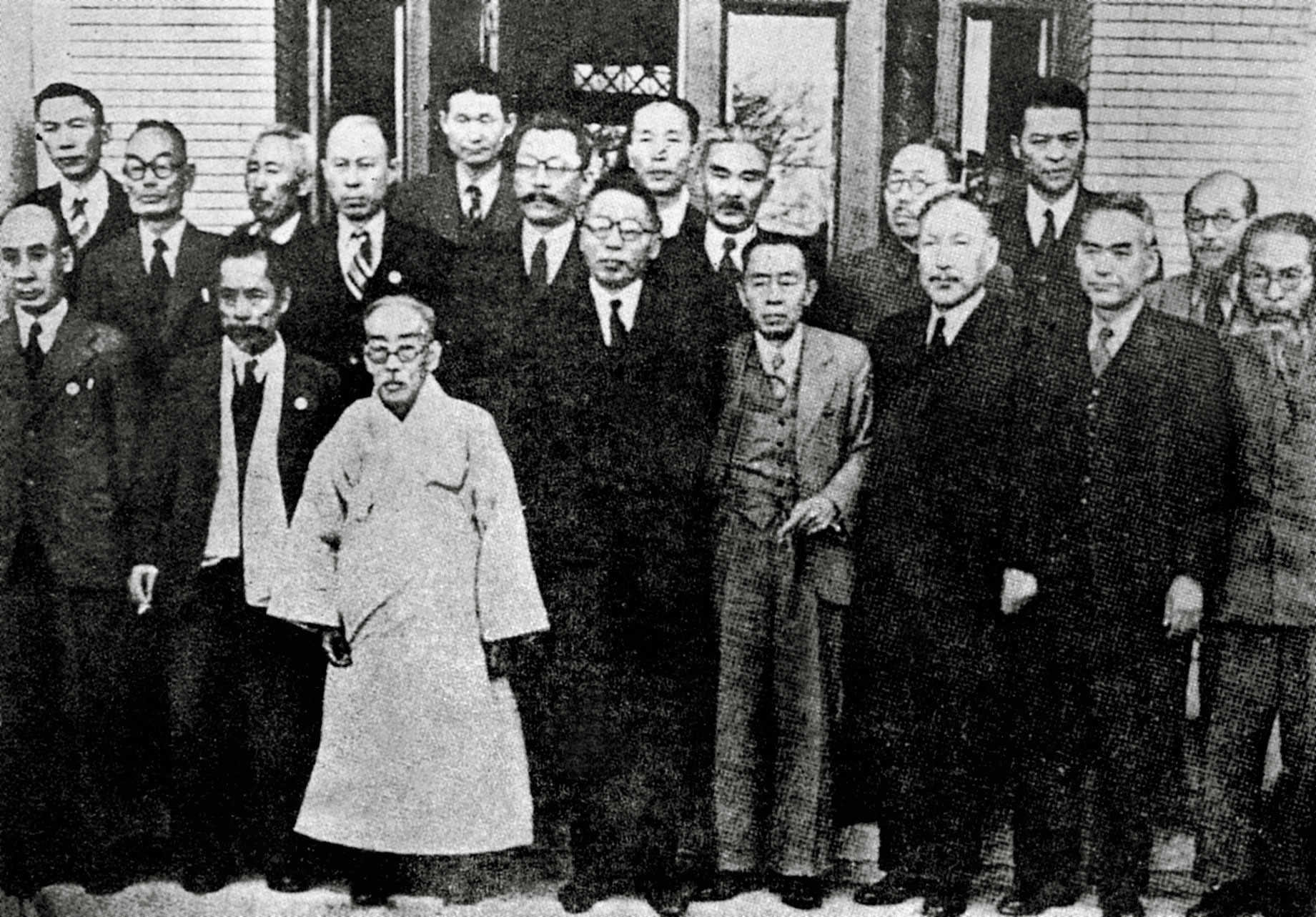
December 3, 1945 Photo of Provisional Government of the Republic of Korea. The one on the right side of the second row is Sŏng Chusik

Sŏng Chusik (Korean: 성주식; Hanja: 成周寔; 1891–1959) is a Korean soldier, socialist independence activist at the time of Korea under Japanese rule and politician of North Korea.

In the time of Korea under Japanese rule, he was in Korean Volunteers Army(조선의용대) and the Provisional Government of the Republic of Korea, and after liberation, he participated in the Democratic National Front and the left-right coalition movement.

== See also ==
- Kim Won-bong
- Provisional Government of the Republic of Korea
- Korean National Revolutionary Party
- Left-Right Coalition Movement in Korean peninsula
