= Kwangmu Reform =

Late 19th-century Korean reform

- Hangul: 광무개혁
- Hanja: 光武改革
- RR: Gwangmu gaehyeok
- MR: Kwangmu kaehyŏk

The Kwangmu Reform (Korean: 광무개혁; Hanja: 光武改革) was a collection of reforms that were aimed at modernizing and Westernizing the Korean Empire as it felt held back from what other countries had achieved in their own process of Industrial Revolutions. It takes its name from Gojong, also known as the Gwangmu Emperor. The reforms that took place during the Gwangmu Era from 1897 to 1907 showed, in the long term, Korean potential for starting and achieving modernisation. This sort of development was unseen until the Park Chung Hee-era of the 1960s and 1970s. The Kwangmu reform later staged the fundamental background for future Korean development in infrastructure, reforming the economy and creating the nucleus of the modern bureaucracy and military.

== Reforms ==
=== Abolition of the status system ===
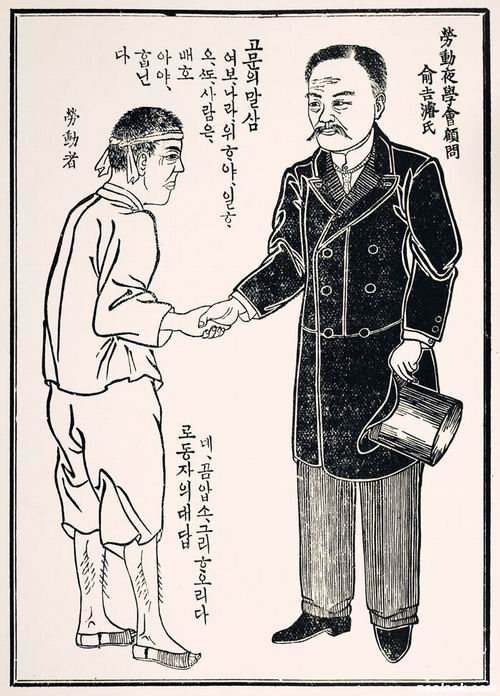
A cartoon during the Korean Empire that shows Yu Gil-jun, the former Yangban and a commoner using the same speech level with each other.

Following the collapse of the Gabo government proclaiming the abolition of the status system, the loyalists’ cabinet was formed in 1896. The new cabinet, which became the Kwangmu government after the establishment of the Korean Empire, introduced systematic measures for abolishing the traditional class system. One of these was the new household registration system, reflecting the goals of formal social equality, which was implemented by the loyalists’ cabinet. Whereas the old registration system signified household members according to their hierarchical social status, the new system called for an occupation.

Although most Koreans by that time had surnames and even bongwan (clan name), a substantial number of cheonmin (low caste commoners), which mostly consisted of serfs and slaves, and untouchables, still did not. According to the new system, they were then required to fill in the blanks for surname in order to be registered as constituting separate households. Instead of creating their own family name, some cheonmins appropriated their masters’ surnames, while others simply took the most common surname and its bongwan in the local area. Along with this example, activists within and outside the Korean government had based their visions of a new relationship between the government and people through the concept of citizenship, employing the term Inmin (people), and later, Kukmin (citizen).

=== Lifestyle ===
During the Kwangmu period, Western-style official uniforms were introduced in Korea. At the start, the Korean Emperor had begun to wear Prussian-style royal attire along with Korean diplomats, who wore Western suits. In 1900, Western attire became the official uniform for Korean civil officials. Several years later, all Korean soldiers and policemen were required to wear Western style uniforms.

=== Military ===
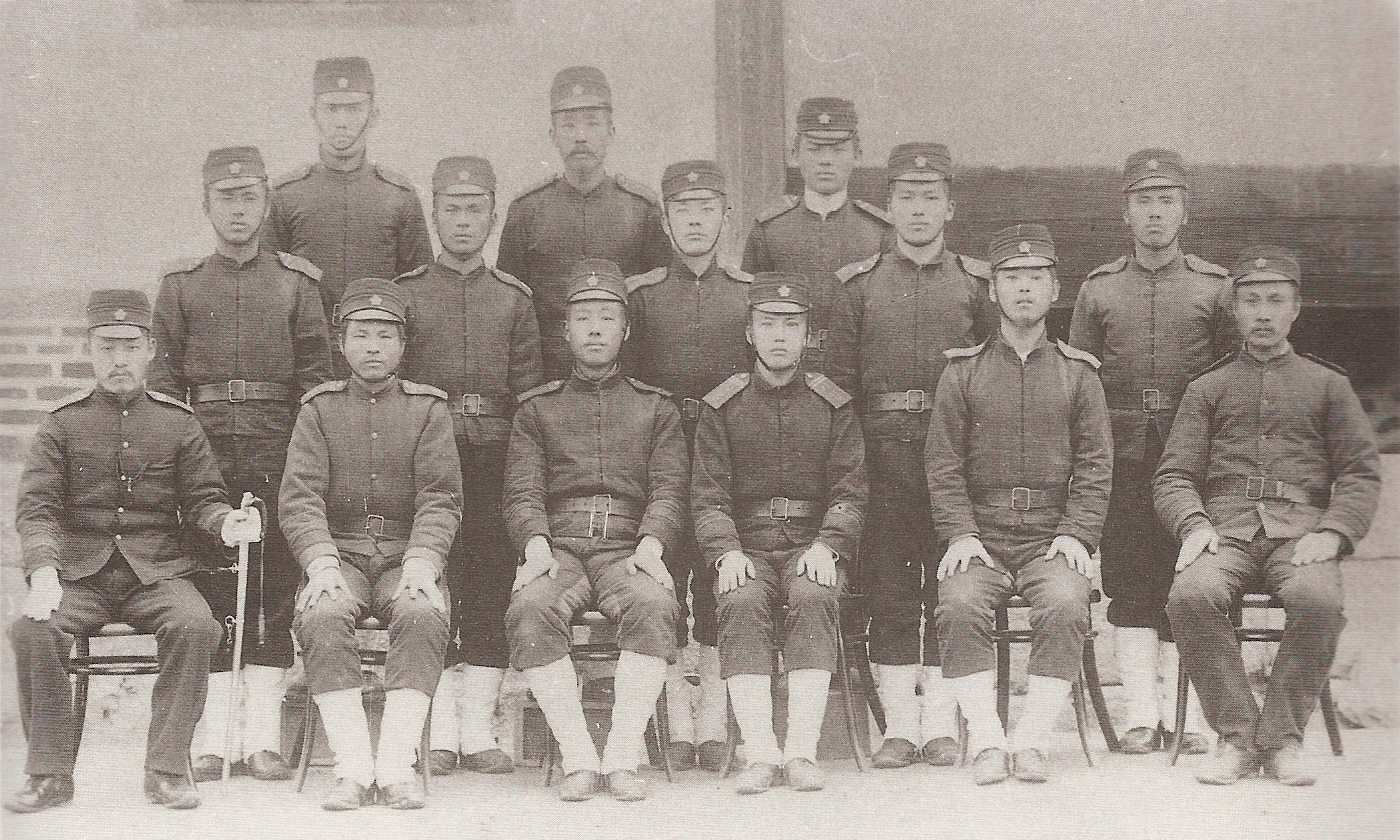
The modernised army of the Korean Empire in 1898

In the military sphere, the Military of the Korean Empire as it existed in the early 1890s consisted of about 5,000 soldiers and was increased to an immense amount of 28,000 right before the Russo-Japanese War. Training by Russian officers beginning in 1896 led to the organization of a 1,000-strong royal bodyguard armed with Berdan rifles that served as the core of an improved army. From this core unit, soldiers were sometimes transferred to other units, which included five regiments of about 900 men each. Moreover, the reform equipped personnels with western military uniforms.

=== Finance ===
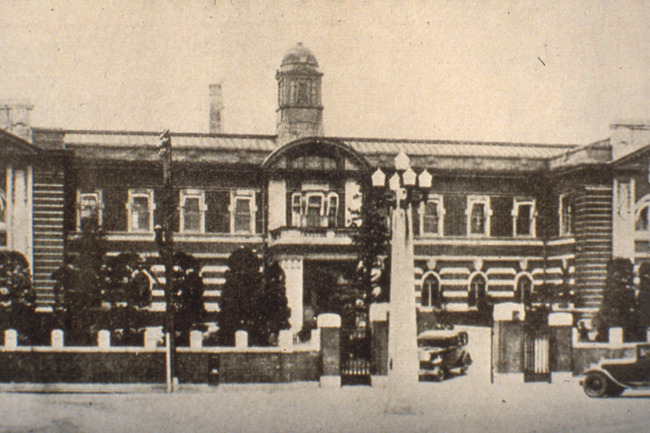
The building of Office of Crown Property under Imperial Household Ministry of the Korean Empire

In 1897, the cadastral survey project was launched by the Kwangmu government, aimed at modernizing the landownership system. In order to apply Western surveying methods, U.S. surveyors were hired. After the survey, a property title “Jigye”, showing the exact dimension of the land, were to be issued by the authorities. That reform was closely tied to reforms on the land tax system, which was conducted under the leadership of Yi Yong-ik, who also carried out monetary reforms in Korea. The project was interrupted due to the Russo-Japanese War of 1904 and 1905, after surveys were finished on about two-thirds of the entire land.

=== Infrastructure ===
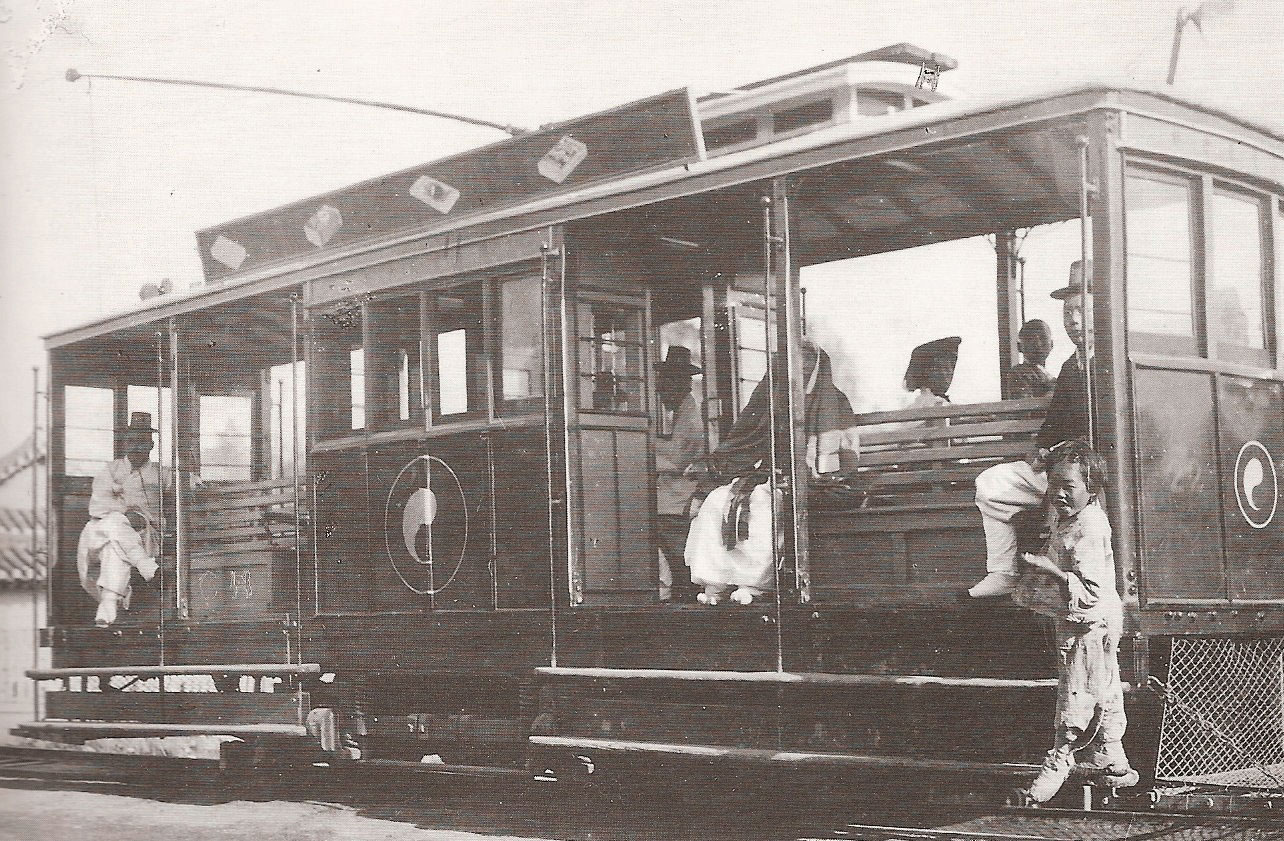
A streetcar in Seoul, 1903

During this period, modern urban infrastructure was built by the Kwangmu government. In 1898, the Gwangmu Emperor authorized the creation of joint ventures with American businessmen. In consequence, Hanseong Electric Company, operating a public electrical lighting network and an electric streetcar system was founded. Seoul Fresh Spring Water Company had an American connection as well. In 1902, six years after the first introduction of the telephone in Korea, the first long-distance public phone was installed.

=== Industries ===
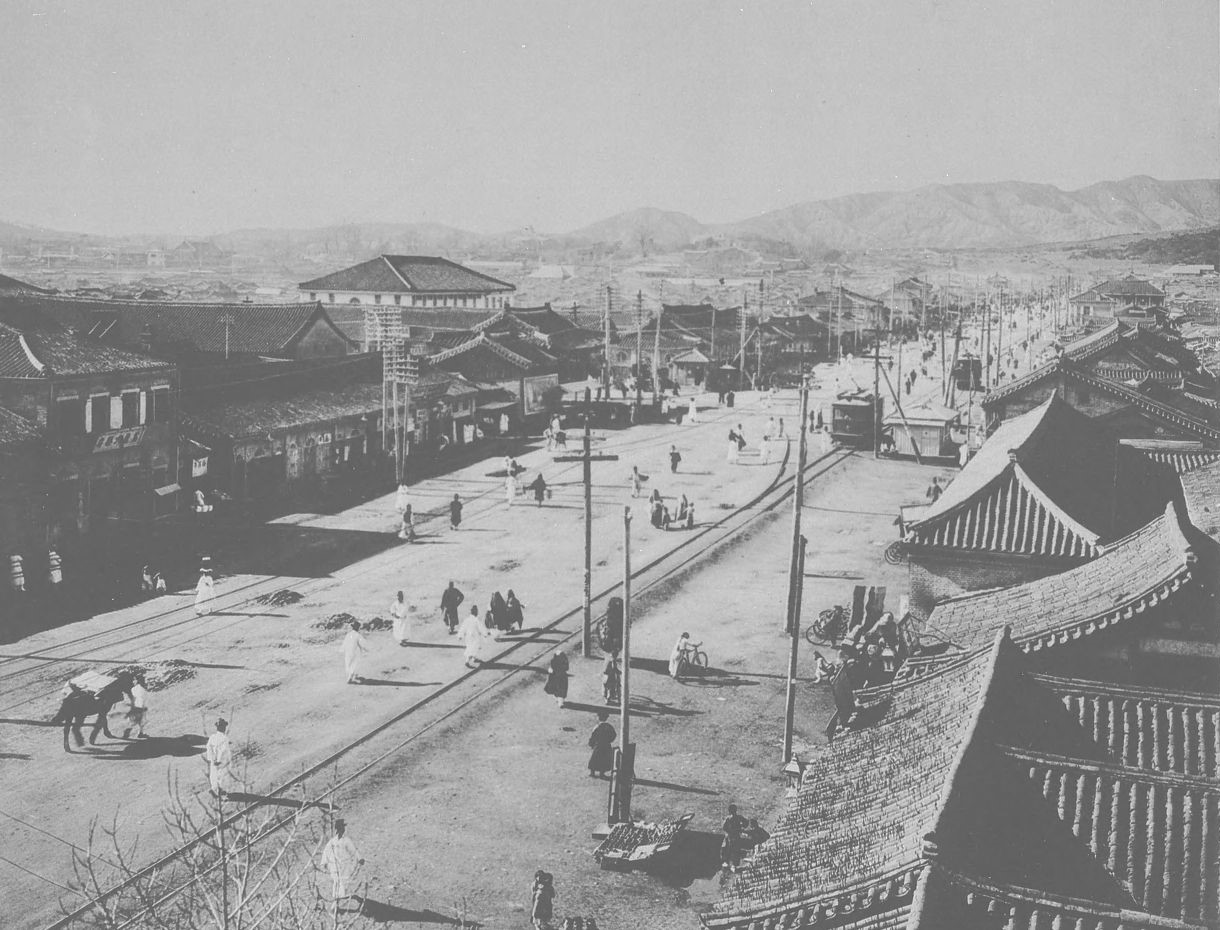
Seoul, capital city of the Korean Empire in 1905, showing contrast between tradition and modernity

During the Kwangmu period, the industrial promotion policy was also conducted by the Korean government. It gave support to found technical and industrial schools. In that time, along with modernized weaving factories which were established to meet demand for textiles on the domestic market, technological innovations in the field of weaving industry occurred in Korea. For instance, spinning and weaving machines were made for producing silk, so as to be substituted for high-cost machines from abroad.

=== Education ===
After Gojong proclaimed a new education law, elementary schools were established by the government. Along with these modern public schools, a number of Western-style schools, consisting of elementary and/or secondary education section(s), were established by Western missionaries.

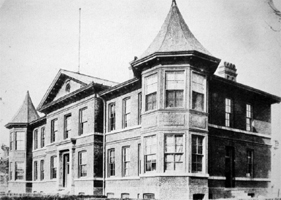
The building of Jejungwon (Severance) Hospital in 1904

During the Kwangmu period, modern secondary schools were opened by the Korean government as well, along with private secondary schools established by rich Korean civilians or Korean modern intellectuals. And several years later, modern higher education was first introduced to Korea: In 1904, the Jejungwon(Severance Hospital) in Seoul, added Severance Hospital Medical School and the attached School of Nursing. In 1905, Bosung College was established under Yi Yong-ik, Chief of the Imperial Treasury: the Commerce Department and the Law Department were the first two departments of the college. The Soongsil Academy, started at Pyongyang in 1897, had opened a college in 1905 and was authorized as the Soongsil University by the Korean government in 1907. Under the Education Ordinance of 1911 issued by Japanese Governor-General of Korea, however, these institutions lost its college status. During the period 1885–1910, a total of 796 schools, from elementary to college levels, were established and maintained by Western missionaries. This is a significant number in that it comprised about 35% of the entire number of formal schools (2,250) in the Korean Empire.

=== Health care system ===
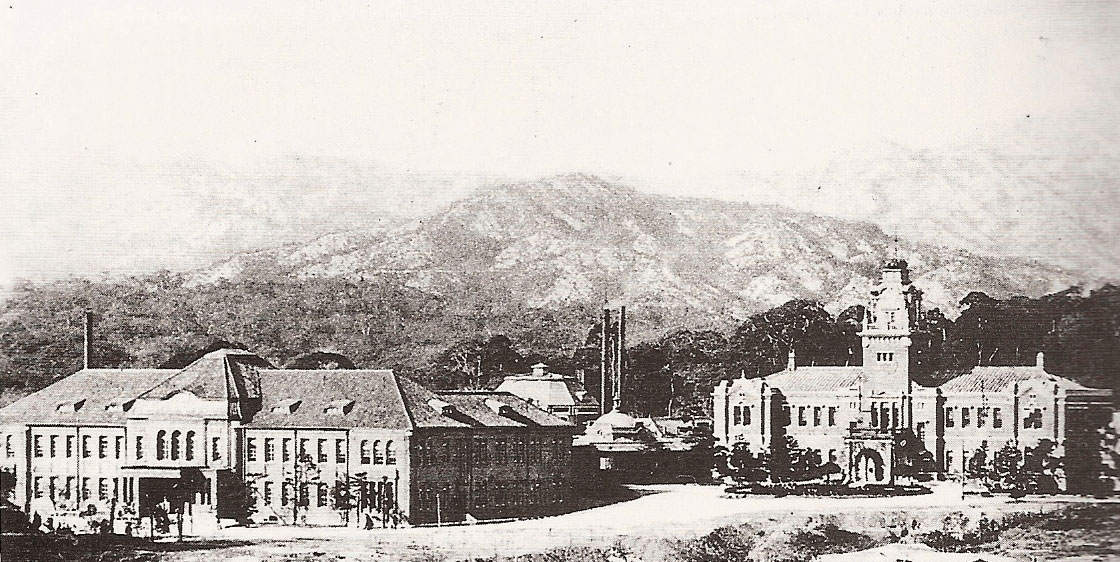
The Taehan Hospital built in 1907 by order of the Japanese Resident-General of Korea Itō Hirobumi.

The modern health care system in Korea had been formed for about 30 years since the country was opened to foreigners in 1876. Most of the system had been achieved during the Kwangmu Reform period directed by the emperor and his followers. The new system consisted of three sectors: public health, medical care, and monitoring of private practitioners and drug-sellers. The Sanitary Board was set to provide systematic public health care such as vaccination, sanitation and quarantine and the police were created to enforce many sanitary affairs. Hospitals for Western medicine were established in the medical care sector. Licensing for herbal doctors and pharmacists was taken in order to control the quality of private practitioners.

== See also ==
- Timeline of the Kwangmu Reform
- Constitution of the Korean Empire
- Meiji Restoration, a similar process in Japan
- Late Qing reforms and Hundred Days' Reform, a similar process in China
- Miracle on the Han River
