= Yi Sangsŏl =

Korean politician (1870–1917)

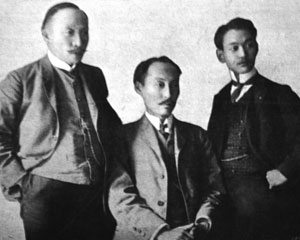
- Yi Chun,Yi Sangsŏl and Yi Wijong (Hague Secret Emissary Affair)

Personal details
- Born: December 7, 1870 Jincheon, Chungcheong, Joseon
- Died: April 1, 1917 (aged 46) Nikolsk, Primorsky Krai, Russian Empire
- Awards: Order of Merit for National Foundation (1962)

Korean name
- Hangul: 이상설
- Hanja: 李相卨
- RR: I Sangseol
- MR: I Sangsŏl

Yi Sangsŏl (Korean: 이상설; Hanja: 李相卨; December 7, 1870 – April 1, 1917), also known as Yi Sang-seol, was a Korean civil servant and independence activist.

== Biography ==
Yi Sangsŏl was born on December 7, 1870, in Jincheon, Chungcheong, Joseon. His biological father was Yi Haeng-u. He was famous for his brightness, so in 1876, at the age of 7, he was adopted into Yi Yong-u's family and he relocated to Seoul. In 1896, he became a professor at Seonggyungwan.

In 1904, when the Empire of Japan demanded the reclamation right of wasteland, he made an appeal to the king to refuse this. Upon the enacting of the Japan–Korea Treaty of 1905, he made an appeal to the king to oppose the treaty and execute the Five Eulsa Traitors. When this did not happen, Yi left his office as professor and attempted suicide.

From then on, he took initiative in restoring national rights through the patriotic enlightenment movement. In 1907 he and his compatriots Yi Chun and Yi Wijong were delegated by Emperor Gojong to attend the Second Hague Peace Conference in The Hague. He was commissioned to announce to the international community that Korea was an independent state and that the Japanese invasion was unlawful. The trio traveled for two months on the Trans-Siberian Railway to The Hague.

The Korean delegation was not officially invited, although the Netherlands initially planned to invite them. The Japanese government had been able to step in, succeeding in convincing the other delegates of the conference not to let Korea participate. The mission, therefore, had already failed. However, the three Koreans succeeded in receiving worldwide attention due to a press conference by an independent newspaper which covered the Peace Conference. The direct result of their mission was that the Korean Emperor Gojong was forced to resign in favor of his son Sunjong. In 1910, Yi founded 13 douigun (13도의군) troops against the Empire of Japan with Yoo In-seok, Yi Beom-yun, and Yi Nam-gi, intended to unite loyal troops and fight a more effective war against Japan. In 1917, at the age of 47, he died in Ussuriysk (at that time named Nikolsk). He left a will, the contents of which were to burn his body and keepsakes, and not perform ancestral rites. Per his will, his body and library were burnt.

== Legacy ==
In 1962, Government of South Korea conferred the Order of Merit for National Foundation (Order of the President) on Yi to honor his meritorious deeds.

== See also ==
- Hague Secret Emissary Affair
