= Yi Wijong =

Korean diplomat (1884–c.1924)

Yi Ouitjyong
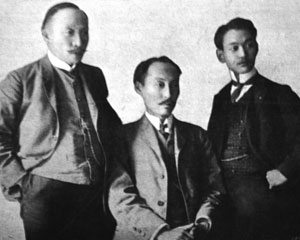
- Yi Chun, Yi Sangsŏl and Yi Wijong (Hague Secret Emissary Affair)
- Born: 1884 or 1887; Seoul, Joseon
- Died: 1924(?)
- Military career
- Allegiance: Russian Empire (1911–1917); Russian SFSR (1918–1922)
- Branch: Imperial Russian Army; Red Army
- Service years: 1911–1922
- Rank: Podporuchik
- Conflicts: World War I; Eastern Front; Russian Civil War
- Awards: Order of Merit for National Foundation (1962)

Korean name
- Hangul: 이위종
- Hanja: 李瑋鍾
- RR: I Wijong
- MR: I Wijong

Yi Wijong (Korean: 이위종; 1884–1924(?)), name sometimes rendered as Yi Ouitjyong, was a Korean diplomat and military officer. His name in Russian is Vladimir Sergeyevich Li (Владимир Сергеевич Ли). Yi took part in World War I as a 2nd lieutenant (Podporuchik) of the Imperial Russian Army and served on the Eastern Front. Post-WWI, Yi joined the Bolsheviks and fought in the Red Army during the Russian Civil War.

== Life ==
Yi was born in 1884. In 1907 he, Yi Chun, and Yi Sangsŏl were delegated by Emperor Gojong to attend the Second Hague Peace Conference at The Hague. At that time, he was proficient in seven languages. However, they were barred from joining the conference due to Imperial Japan's objections as the supreme Asian power of the time. However, with the assistance of the Journalists Association, Yi was able to present a speech in English to 150 journalists at The Hague concerning Japan's invasion of Korea and its void legality. Wijong Yi buried Yi Chun at The Hague and went to the United States with Yi Sangsŏl, and from there to Vladivostok and Saint Petersburg.

In 1911, after his father killed himself, he became a military officer of the Imperial Russian Army and participated in World War I. After the outbreak of the October Revolution and the signing of the Treaty of Brest-Litovsk, Yi joined the Bolsheviks and fought in the Red Army during the Russian Civil War. In the process, he cut off all communication with his erstwhile aristocratic wife and his family members. He fought in battles around Irkutsk against Alexander Kolchak's White Army. After the war, he served as an apparatchik in Krasnoyarsk and Chita until 1924. Not much is known of Yi's life after 1924.

== Family ==
His father Yi Pŏmjin was a Korean politician and diplomat. Yi Wijong married a Russian noble, Elizabeta Noelke (1888–1942), in 1906. The couple had three daughters; Vera (1906–1920), Nyna (1909–1940), and Zena (1912-?). Their descendants still live in Russia.

== See also ==
- Greater Korean Empire
