= Ok Kwanbin =

Korean independence activist (1887–1933)

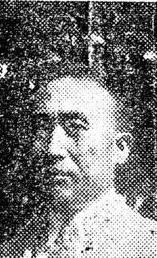
- Ok, image from a newspaper article about his death
- Died: 1 August 1933; Shanghai, China
- Cause of death: Assassination

Korean name
- Hangul: 옥관빈
- Hanja: 玉觀彬
- RR: Ok Gwanbin
- MR: Ok Kwanbin

Ok Kwanbin (Korean: 옥관빈; Hanja: 玉觀彬; ? – 1 August 1933) was a Korean independence activist, alleged Korean collaborator with Imperial Japan, and businessman.

He was once a member of the New People's Association of the Korean Provisional Government (KPG). However, he eventually left the KPG and allegedly became a wealthy collaborator with the Japanese.

He was assassinated at the behest of Kim Ku, by agents of the anarchist South China Korean Youth Alliance.

== Assassination ==
Around July 1933, Kim Ku felt that Ok Kwanbin had turned into a cooperator with the Japanese government and was publicly slandering members of the independence movement. Around this time, Ok was quite wealthy and prominent in Shanghai society, employing hundreds at a pharmaceutical company, acquiring newspaper companies, buying luxury cars, and making deals with Japanese colonial institutions. The betrayal and perceived flaunting of wealth infuriated Kim and several others, and they agreed to assassinate Ok. Kim enlisted the help of a group of anarchists in Shanghai called the South China Korean Youth Alliance. Independently of the KPG, they previously had engaged in various attacks on the Japanese military in Shanghai. Kim had the money but lacked reliable manpower. So he enlisted their help and funded them to carry out the assassination.

On 1 August 1933, at 9 pm, the assassination was carried out. The group had tracked Ok's movements for two months and found that he was having an affair with a woman who lived in the French Concession. The assassins were Oh Myŏnjik and Ŏm Hyŏngsun. (Note: 오면직; 吳冕稙, 엄형순) When Ok left the house of his mistress, Ŏm pulled up in a car and fired three shots at Ok, killing him on the spot. One week after, Kim Ku sent a press release to various newspapers in Shanghai, announcing the killing and the motivations behind it.

=== Related assassinations ===
A number of other assassinations followed that were caused by Ok's. On 17 August, a pro-Japanese Korean officer named Yi Chinryong, (Note: 이진룡; 李珍龍) who was investigating Kim and Ok's murder, was shot by members of the Shanghai Korean Association, which Kim was a member of (at latest) since 1923.

The Chinese and Korean communities were shocked by the attacks. Many sympathizers panicked, thinking they'd be next. Yu Inpal (유인발; 柳寅發), the leader of the Shanghai Korean Friends Association (상해한국인친우회; 上海韓國人親友會), decided he would not sit around until they came for him. On 28 August, he went door-to-door in the French Concession with a concealed pistol, asking everyone how they felt about the Association. He eventually met Pak Ch'angse (박창세; 朴昌世), a KPG member and Kim ally. They had a friendly conversation long into the night, with Pak assuring Yu he meant no harm. On 31 August, a young assassin rushed into Yu's home and shot him, but he survived. Later examination of the bullet casings found that they were the same as those used in Yi's assassination. Later, an arrest warrant was issued for Pak, but he escaped.

The third assassination was on 18 December. Ok's cousin, also a Japanese sympathizer, had been seeking revenge for his cousin's death. He was then himself shot and killed.

== See also ==
- Politics of South Korea
