= Yi Chun =

Korean diplomat (1859–1907)

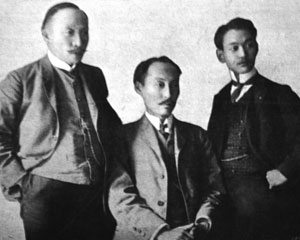
- Yi Chun, Yi Sangsŏl and Yi Wi-jong (Hague Secret Emissary Affair)
- Born: December 18, 1859; Bukcheong, Joseon
- Died: July 14, 1907 (aged 47); The Hague, Netherlands
- Occupations: Diplomat, judge, prosecutor

Korean name
- Hangul: 이준
- Hanja: 李儁
- RR: I Jun
- MR: I Chun

Yi Chun (Korean: 이준; Hanja: 李儁; December 18, 1859 – July 14, 1907), name sometimes rendered Yi Tjoune, (Note: His name is also spelled "Yi Jun") was a Korean prosecutor and diplomat and the father of the North Korean politician Lee Yong.

== Early life ==
Yi Chun was born in 1859 in Pukchong County, South Hamgyong Province, Joseon. He is of the Jeonju Yi clan.

== Career ==
In 1907, Yi, Yi Sangsŏl, and Yi Wijong were delegated by Emperor Gojong to attend the Second Hague Peace Conference in The Hague, Netherlands. He was commissioned to announce to the international community that Korea was an independent state and that the Japanese invasion was unlawful. They traveled for two months on the Trans-Siberian Railway. The Korean delegation was not officially invited, although some in the conference were aware that they were coming. However, the Japanese government succeeded in convincing the other delegates of the conference to reject the participation of the Korean delegates. Yi protested against the decision. A few days later, he was found dead in his room at the Hotel De Jong on Wagenstraat. His cause of death is unknown, but in South Korea it is assumed that he committed suicide due to the rejection by the international community. In time, however, Japanese newspapers suggested that he was killed by Japanese spies.

The mission had already failed. However, the three Koreans succeeded in receiving worldwide attention due to a press conference and coverage in an independent newspaper which reported on the Peace Conference. The direct result of their mission was that the Korean Emperor, Gojong was forced to resign in favor of his son Sunjong.

== Legacy ==
Yi was buried at the Nieuw Eykenduynen cemetery in The Hague. His remains were exhumed on September 26, 1963 and transferred to South Korea and there reburied. A grand memorial was established in 1977 at the site of his initial burial. On several occasions postage stamps have been issued by North Korea honoring Yi Jun.

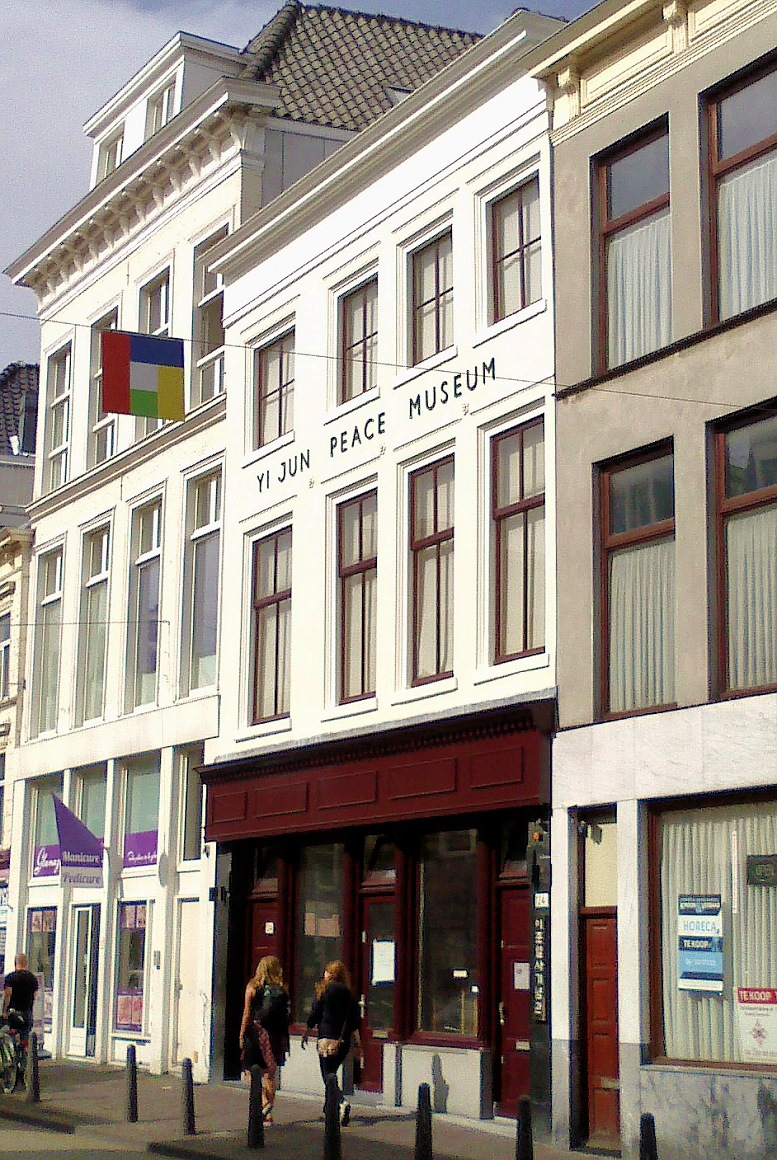
Yi Jun Peace Museum, The Hague

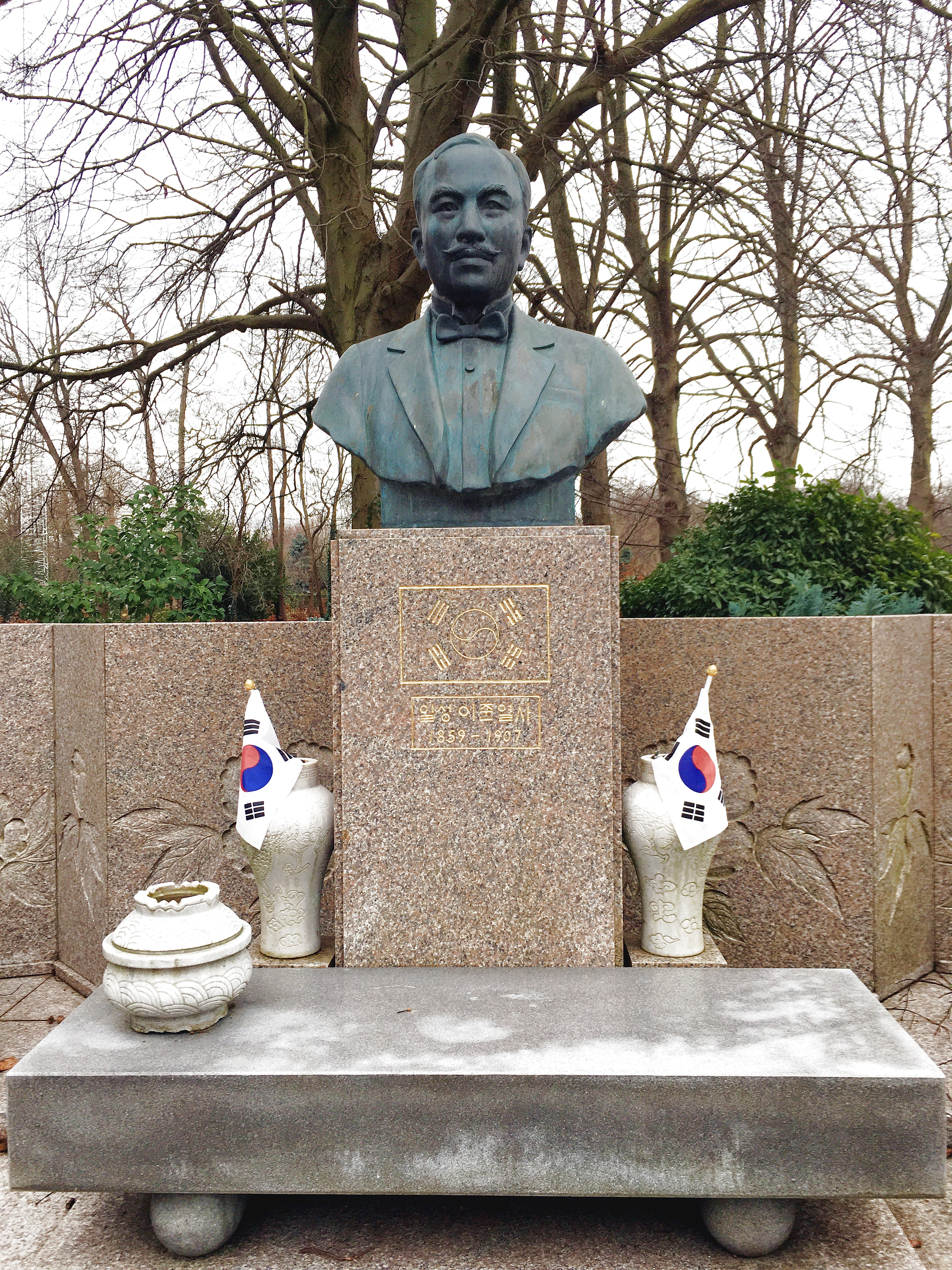
Yi Chun memorial at Nieuw Eykenduynen Cemetery, The Hague

The former hotel De Jong, where Yi died, is now the Yi Jun Peace Museum.

== See also ==
- Hague Secret Emissary Affair
