= Jeon Myeong-un =

Korean independence activist (1884–1947)

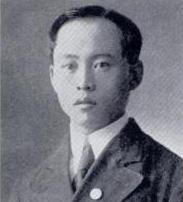
- Jeon in 1907
- Born: June 25, 1884; Seoul, Korea
- Died: November 19, 1947 (aged 63); Los Angeles, California, United States
- Known for: His involvement in the assassination of Durham Stevens

Korean name
- Hangul: 전명운
- Hanja: 田明雲
- RR: Jeon Myeongun
- MR: Chŏn Myŏngun

Art name
- Hangul: 죽암
- Hanja: 竹嵒
- RR: Jukam
- MR: Chugam

Jeon Myeong-un (June 25, 1884 – November 19, 1947) was a Korean independence activist. He is best known along with Jang In-hwan for his role in the 1908 assassination of Durham Stevens, a former American diplomat in Japan who was later appointed as an advisor to the Joseon Dynasty government.

Jeon was a member of the Dongnip Hyeophoe, a Korean American association in the Bay Area. In March 1908, infuriated by Stevens' remarks claiming that common people in Korea welcomed the increasing Japanese influence in their country, the Dongnip Hyeophoe held a joint meeting with the Daedong Bogukhoe, another local association of Koreans of which Jang was a member. In a 1974 interview, Yang Ju-eun, a fellow attendee of that meeting, remembered that Jeon had a reputation in the community as a man of action, in contrast to Jang, whom he described as a "quiet and shy Christian gentleman".

On March 23, 1908, Jeon and Jang approached Stevens at the Port of San Francisco as he prepared to embark on a ship bound for Washington, D.C. Jeon attempted to fire his revolver at Stevens but his gun, which was wrapped in a handkerchief, would not fire. Jeon then rushed at Stevens and used his weapon as a club to hit Stevens in the face. Jeon then ran off and was pursued by Stevens. Jang then fired at Stevens, the first bullet hit Jeon and two others struck Stevens in the back. The crowd which had gathered urged that they be lynched on the spot; Jang was arrested and held without bail on a charge of murder, while Jeon was sent to the hospital for treatment. After the death of Stevens in hospital, Jeon provided a written statement in Korean detailing his reasons for the attack on Stevens, in which he asserted that Stevens had betrayed the trust of Koreans who "looked to him, as an American, for justice" and expressed his willingness to die in order to express his anger at Stevens' falsehoods about the Korean peoples' condition under Japanese rule. The statement was translated and first printed by the San Francisco Call. There was insufficient evidence to prove that Jeon and Jang had conspired with each other; Jeon was still charged with being an accessory to murder. However, in June 1908, the judge ruled that there was insufficient evidence to try him for murder or as an accessory to murder. He allowed Jeon to be released from custody without bail, after which he fled to Siberia. After Jang's trial, Jeon returned to San Francisco and became a naturalized citizen. He died in Los Angeles in 1947.

Jeon was posthumously awarded the Order of Merit for National Foundation by South Korea's Ministry of Patriots' and Veterans' Affairs in 1962.
