= Jejungwon (TV series) =

2010 South Korean period medical drama

- Promotional poster
- Also known as: Jejoongwon; Jejungwon The Hospital
- Genre: Medical drama; Period drama
- Written by: Lee Ki-won
- Directed by: Hong Chang-wook
- Starring: Park Yong-woo; Han Hye-jin; Yeon Jung-hoon
- Country of origin: South Korea
- Original language: Korean
- No. of episodes: 36

Production
- Executive producer: Kim Young Sub
- Running time: 60 minutes
- Production companies: Kim Jong-hak Production; My Name Is Entertainment

Original release
- Network: Seoul Broadcasting System
- Release: 4 January – 4 May 2010

Jejungwon (Korean: 제중원; Hanja: 濟眾院) is a 2010 South Korean period medical drama television series about the founding and early years of Jejungwon, the first modern Western hospital in the Joseon Dynasty. The hospital was founded in 1885 and began accepting a small class of students for training in Western medicine.

Starring Park Yong-woo, Han Hye-jin and Yeon Jung-hoon, the series aired on SBS from January 4 to May 4, 2010, on Mondays and Tuesdays at 21:55 for 36 episodes.

== Plot ==
Jejungwon (originally known as Gwanghyewon, or "House of Extended Grace"; the name was later changed to Jejungwon and then Severance Hospital after a major donor) was established in 1885 by Emperor Gojong at the suggestion of Horace Newton Allen, one of the newly arrived American medical missionaries. The first modern Western hospital in the Kingdom of Joseon, Jejungwon is documented as treating sick people regardless of their economic status, despite the hierarchical society of the era.

With Allen as its first hospital director, Jejungwon accepted 16 students for medical training. The series follows their training and careers.

== Characters ==
- Hwang Jung was born to a family of butchers. Considered the lowest social rank in Joseon, along with gravediggers and executioners, butchers were not allowed to have family names. Hwang Jung is initially called "Little Dog." Expected to become a butcher like his father before him, Hwang Jung is intelligent and literate, and dreams of becoming something more. The death of his mother, who was unable to get treatment because of her low social status, drives him to pursue Western medicine. He works first as a groundskeeper at the hospital before becoming a student there. He works his way up to become Joseon's first surgeon and one of the country's premier doctors. He later joins the independence movement, while continuing to work as a physician. (Hwang Jung is based on real-life historical figure Park Seo-yang.)
- Baek Do-yang is a bright and ambitious nobleman, the only son of the Minister of Justice. His father is adamant that he enter the civil service, and he performs as the top student at the royal academy. But Do-yang is fascinated by Western medicine, and secretly reads all the medical books he can. He decides to give up his enviable social status and studies medicine at Jejungwon, where he enters into an intense rivalry with Hwang Jung.
- Yoo Seok-ran is a modern woman in her era. She was born to wealthy parents (her father is a court interpreter and merchant) who permitted her to be educated, unlike most young women of her class. She becomes fluent in English and dresses in Western clothing. While working at Jejungwon as Allen's interpreter, she is drawn to Hwang Jung. But she is engaged to Baek Do-yang, whom she's known since childhood. Under Lilias Horton's mentorship, Seok-ran studies to become Joseon's first female doctor in Western medicine.

As modern medical science clashes with old practices in turn of the century Korea, the personal and professional challenges of Jejungwon's doctors take place against the historical and social turbulence of the times.

== Cast ==
- Park Yong-woo as Hwang Jung
  - Cha Jae-dol as young Hwang Jung
- Han Hye-jin as Yoo Seok-ran
- Yeon Jung-hoon as Baek Do-yang
  - Shin Dong-ki as young Baek Do-yang
- Sean Richard Dulake as Horace Newton Allen
- Kim Kap-soo as Yoo Hee-seo
- Seo In-seok as Baek Tae-hyun
- Jang Hang-sun as "Yard Dog", then Hwang Jung-bu, Hwang Jung's father
- Do Ki-seok as Mong Chong
- Choi Jong-hwan as Emperor Gojong
- Kang Nam-gil as Watanabe
- Jang Hyun-sung as Min Young-ik
- Yoo Tae-woong as Kim Ok-gyun
- Kim Seung-wook as Hong Young-shik
- Cha Hwa-yeon as Hwang Jung's mother
- Jung Suk-yong as Lee Kwak/Jak Dae
- Yoon Gi-won as Yoon Je-wook
- Won Ki-joon as Evangelist Jung
- Geum Bo-ra as Seok-ran's mother
- Seo Hye-rin as Kim Mak-saeng
- Jung Gyu-soo as Japanese minister
- Kwon Hae-hyo as Oh Chung-hwan
- Ricky Kim as John William Heron
- Fabien Yoon as Oliver Avison
- Catherine Baillie as Lilias Horton
- Seo Yi-sook as Queen Min
- Yoo Hye-jung as Park So-sa
- Kim Tae-hee as Mi-ryung
- Choi Su-rin as Mak-saeng
- Shin Ji-soo as Nang-rang
- Song Young-kyu as Go Jang-geun
- Kim Gyu-jin as Chil-bok
- Lee Hyo-jung as Baek Kyu-hyun
- Kim Ho-chang as physician
- Ha Dae-ro as physician
- Choi Ja-hye as nurse Naoko
- Lee Sol-gu as patient
- Seok Jin-yi as Suzuki
- Lee Jung-yong as Lee Yong-ik
- Jeon Jin-ki as Sugimura
- Song Soo-hyun as Chi-roo's daughter
- Oh Ji-heon as Japanese soldier
- Song Bong-geun
- Min Joon-hyun
- Yoon Seo-hyun
- Heo Joon-suk
- Jeon Ji-hoo as supporting
- Lee Sang-yoon as Ji Seok-young (cameo)
- Park No-shik as patient (cameo)
- Lee Jin as Young-in (cameo)
- Ki Tae-young as Jwauijeong's son (cameo, ep 22)
- Son Hyun-joo as general (cameo)
- Kim Sung-oh as Sungkyunkwan scholar
- Kim Ji-hyun as Chwi-ran

== International broadcast ==
It aired in Thailand on Channel 3 beginning May 20, 2012, dubbed as Jejungwon Tảnān phæthy̒ h̄æ̀ng Joseon. ("เจจุงวอน ตำนานแพทย์แห่งโชซอน", literally: Jejungwon: Legendary Doctor of Joseon).
