= Horace Grant (disambiguation) =

- Horace Grant (born July 4, 1965) is an American former professional basketball player
- Horace Grant one of the Grant brothers, a trio of photojournalists
- Horace Grant Underwood a Presbyterian missionary, educator, and translator who dedicated his life to developing Christianity in Korea
