= 10 Magazine =

10 Magazine may refer to:

- 10 Magazine (South Korean magazine), an English language monthly magazine published in Seoul, Korea
- 10 Magazine (British magazine), a British luxury quarterly magazine published in London, UK
