= Esther Lucas Shields =

American nurse (1868–1940)

- Born: December 26, 1868; Kelly Township, Union County, Pennsylvania, U.S.
- Died: November 8 1940; Lewisburg, Pennsylvania, U.S.
- Occupations: Nurse, educator, missionary
- Notable work: Founded the nursing school at Yonsei University

Esther Lucas Angeny Shields (December 26, 1868 – November 8, 1940; in Korean, 秀日斯) was an American nurse, nursing educator, and Presbyterian missionary in Korea from 1897 to 1939. She was founder and director of the Nurses Training School at Severance Hospital in Seoul, now a part of Yonsei University.

== Early life and education ==
Shields was born in Kelly Township, Union County, Pennsylvania, the daughter of William Shields and Katharine Angeny Shields. Her father was Union Army veteran of the American Civil War. Her younger brother Edgar Thomson Shields was a physician and a medical missionary in China. She graduated from the nurses' training school at Philadelphia General Hospital.

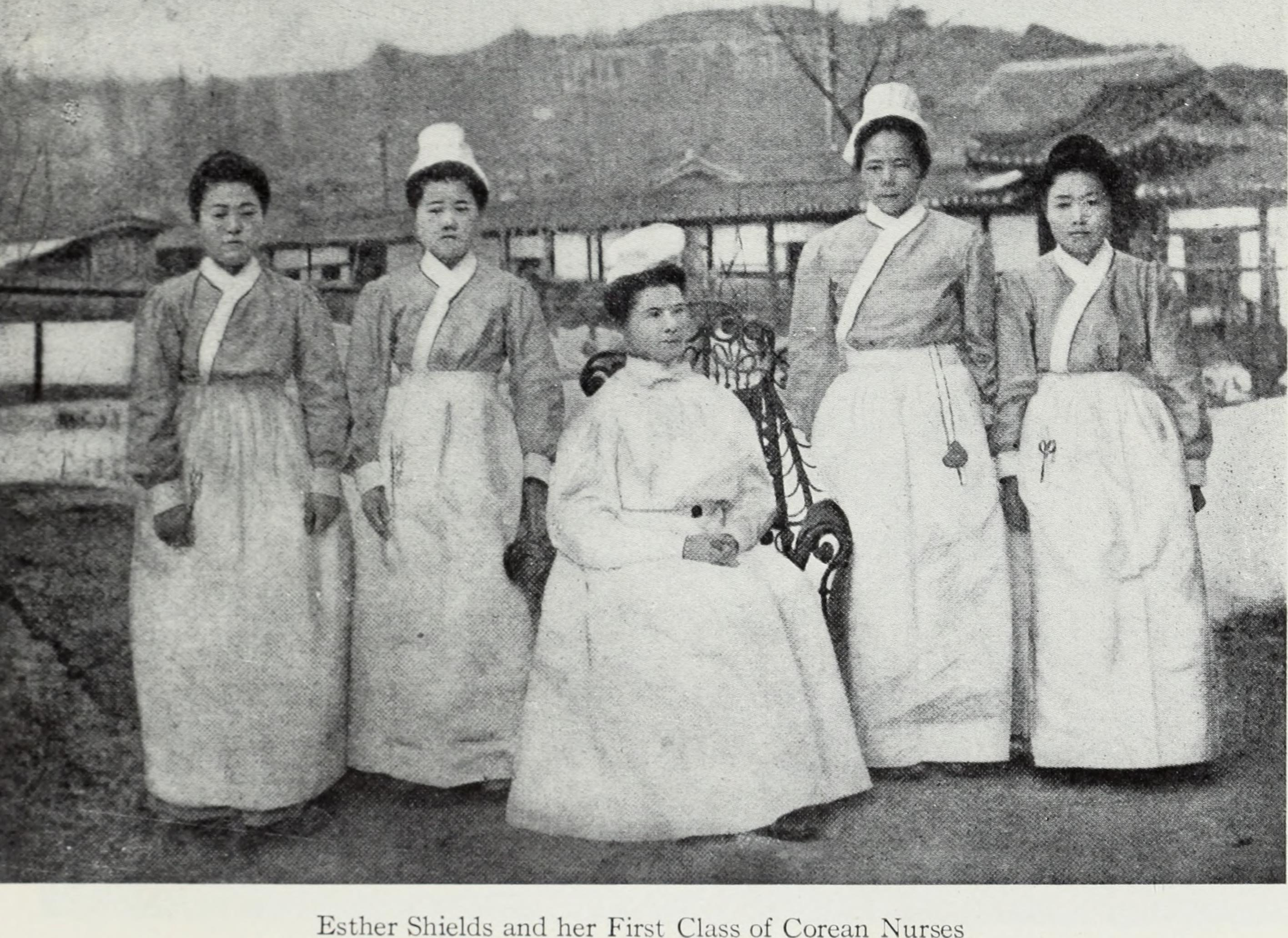
Esther L. Shields, seated, with her first class of Korean nurses, from a 1912 publication

== Career ==
Shields arrived in Korea as a medical missionary in October 1897. In 1906 she opened a nurses' training school at Severance Hospital in Seoul, and was the school's first director. The first four graduates completed their training in June 1909. She was also supervisor of nurses at the hospital. She had a furloughs in the United States from 1913 to 1915, 1923 to 1924, and 1931 to 1932, and spoke to American nurses' groups and church groups about her work. In 1926 she represented Korean nurses at the Biennial Conference of the Nurses' Association of China, held in Nanjing. Severance Hospital, other missionaries, and her many alumni gave her a retirement reception in 1937 in Seoul. She returned to the United States in 1939. During her trip back to Pennsylvania, she stayed for a month in Hawaii, and was honored by her former students who lived there.

== Publications ==
Shields wrote about her work in mission publications such as Woman's Work for Woman and The Korea Mission Field, and for professional journals including American Journal of Nursing. She also wrote descriptive reports for American newspapers.

- "Tastes of Country Work in Syen Chun Field" (1903)
- "Nursing in Mission Stations: Work in Korea" (1908)
- "Training School for Nurses" (1909)
- "Korean and Foreign Nurses" (1911)
- "A Korean Tribute to Isabel Hampton Robb" (1911)
- "News from the Front: Korea" (1912)
- "Korean Graduate Nurses" (1922)
- "Mrs. Ludlow and Kim Whe Soon" (1926)
- In Loving Memory of Eva Field Pieters, M.D. (1932)
- "'Unto the Least of These'" (1934)

== Personal life and legacy ==
Shields died in 1940, at the age of 71, in Lewisburg, Pennsylvania. The Esther L. Shields Simulation Center at Yonsei University College of Nursing is named in her memory. The Presbyterian Church in Lewisburg unveiled a plaque dedicated to Shields' memory in 1941.
