= Park Ji-won =

- Hangul: 박지원
- RR: Bak Jiwon
- MR: Pak Chiwŏn

Park Ji-won may refer to:

- Pak Chiwŏn (philosopher) (1737–1805), Korean philosopher and novelist in the Joseon Dynasty
- Park Ji-weon (1934–2024), South Korean politician and member of the 13th National Assembly of Korea
- Park Jie-won (Bak Jiwon, born 1942), South Korean politician and member of the 14th, 18th, 19th and 20th National Assembly of Korea
- Park Ji-won (speed skater), South Korean speed skater
- Zior Park, (born 1994 as Park Ji-won), South Korean rapper
- Park Ji-won (born 1998), South Korean singer and member of Fromis 9
- Park Ji-won (businessman) (born 1977), South Korean business executive
