= Hong Ok-im and Kim Yong-ju =

South Korean suicide victims (1910/1912–1931)

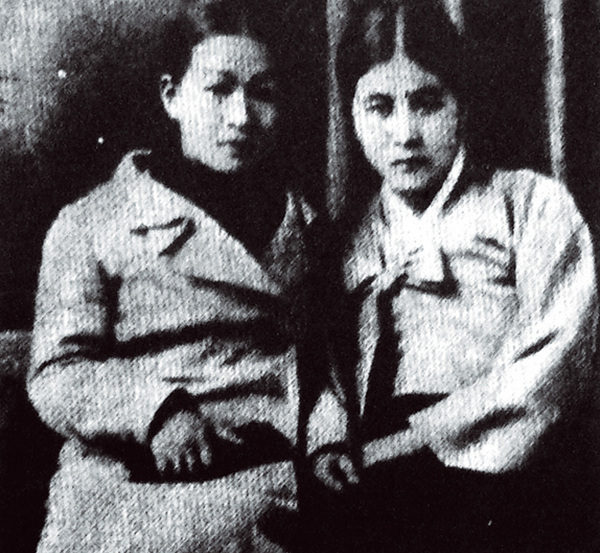
Hong Ok-im and Kim Yong-ju, circa 1930, Hong on left, Kim on right

Hong Ok-im (Korean: 홍옥임; c. 1910 – 8 April 1931) and Kim Yong-ju (Korean: 김용주; c. 1912 – 8 April 1931) were two Korean women who became lovers, and later killing themselves together.

== Lives ==
Hong Ok-im and Kim Yong-ju met in high school. Their personalities were reportedly quite different, with Kim being gentle and educated and Hong being raucous and a poor student. They committed suicide together at 4:15pm, or 4:45pm, on April 8, 1931 by jumping in front of train number 428, about 2 kilometers (1.2 mi) from Yeongdeungpo station in Seoul.

Hong's father was Hong Seok-hu, an ophthalmologist who opened Korea's first private hospital, Severance Hospital, where he was also a professor. She was the niece of musician Hong Yeong-hu. Kim's father was Kim Dong-jin, the manager of a large bookstore and publisher. Hong and Kim's double suicide shocked the world at the time; not only because it was a double same-sex suicide, but because they both came from prominent families. Media dubbed it Korea's first homosexual suicide, although theirs was not the only double suicide in Korea during the 1920s and 1930s. The overall suicide rate in Korea while it was a colony of Japan from 1910-1945 was quite high. The incident received heavy coverage in the media at the time.

The reason for their suicide is often reported as being because they were homosexuals. At the time in Korea, homosexuality among women was actually encouraged because it was considered safer than sex with men and the women had a sense of sympathy for each other in a male dominated society. There was little discrimination until the modern era. Lee Young-ah, a professor at Myongji University, feels homosexuality was not the reason. Hong was betrayed by a male friend at Severance Medical School and her father's infidelity caused problems at home. Kim had been forced by her parents to quit her studies at school in order to marry but her husband soon abandoned her to study in Tokyo to become a pilot but he dropped out of flight school. Even after returning from Tokyo he was reckless, immature and neglectful. She tried to go back to school, but the school would not let her because she was married. These combined events caused her to become deeply depressed.

The pair had two suicide attempts, first trying to drown themselves by walking into a river in March 1931, but people in a boat saw them and saved them. The circumstances of their second suicide attempt are not known. When they killed themselves, they left a note that said "The world is meaningless". Lee feels these personal and domestic problems were more of a factor than homosexuality. A week before her death, Hong had entered the music department of Ewha Womans University. Hong had left the note with her father. At the time of their deaths, Hong was 21 and Kim was 19.

One week after the incident, plans began for a film called Woman of Tomorrow, but it was never made.

== In media ==
- 2008 - Jeon, Bong-gwan (2008). 경성 자살 클럽: 근대 조선을 울린 충격적 자살사건 [The Gyeongseong Suicide Club: A Shocking Suicide Case That Shook Modern Joseon] (in Korean). Sallim Publishing. ISBN 9788952209597.
- 2010 - Orbital Train, 1931, the first same-sex suicide incident in Joseon, play by Kim Tae-ju
- 2012 - Kongchilpal Saesamryuk, musical film directed by Joo Ji-hee
