= Lillias Horton Underwood =

American medical missionary (1851–1921)

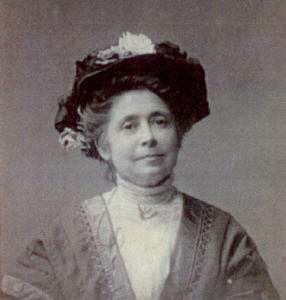
- Lillias Horton Underwood, later in life.
- Born: Lillias Stirling Horton; June 21, 1851; Albany, New York, US
- Died: October 29, 1921 (aged 70); Korea
- Spouse: Horace Grant Underwood

Lillias Horton Underwood (June 21, 1851 – October 29, 1921), born Lillias Stirling Horton, was an American physician and Presbyterian missionary in Korea, alongside her husband Horace Grant Underwood. She served as personal physician to Empress Myeongseong.

== Early life and education ==
Lillias Horton was born in Albany, New York, the daughter of James Mandeville Horton and Matilda McPherson Horton. Her father was a businessman. She earned her medical degree at the Woman's Medical College of Chicago in 1887, and had internships in Chicago hospitals.

== Career ==
Horton arrived in Korea as a medical missionary in 1888, under the auspices of the Presbyterian Board of Foreign Missions. Lillias' was the first recognized female medical doctor among the presbyterian community and later became head of the women's department at a hospital, taught women's Bible classes, and taught English at an orphanage school run by Horace Grant Underwood. She married Underwood in 1889, and continued working as a physician and missionary. She advocated for the rights of married women missionaries, who were excluded from voting on funding and other matters, unlike single women in the field.

Underwood was personal physician to Empress Myeongseong, from 1889 until the empress was assassinated by Japanese soldiers in 1895. She established a small free clinic, called The Shelter, which was converted into a cholera hospital during the 1895 cholera epidemic.

Underwood wrote about her experiences abroad in several books, including Fifteen Years Among the Topknots (1904, 1908), With Tommy Tompkins in Korea (1905), and Underwood of Korea (1918), a biography of her husband.

== Personal life ==
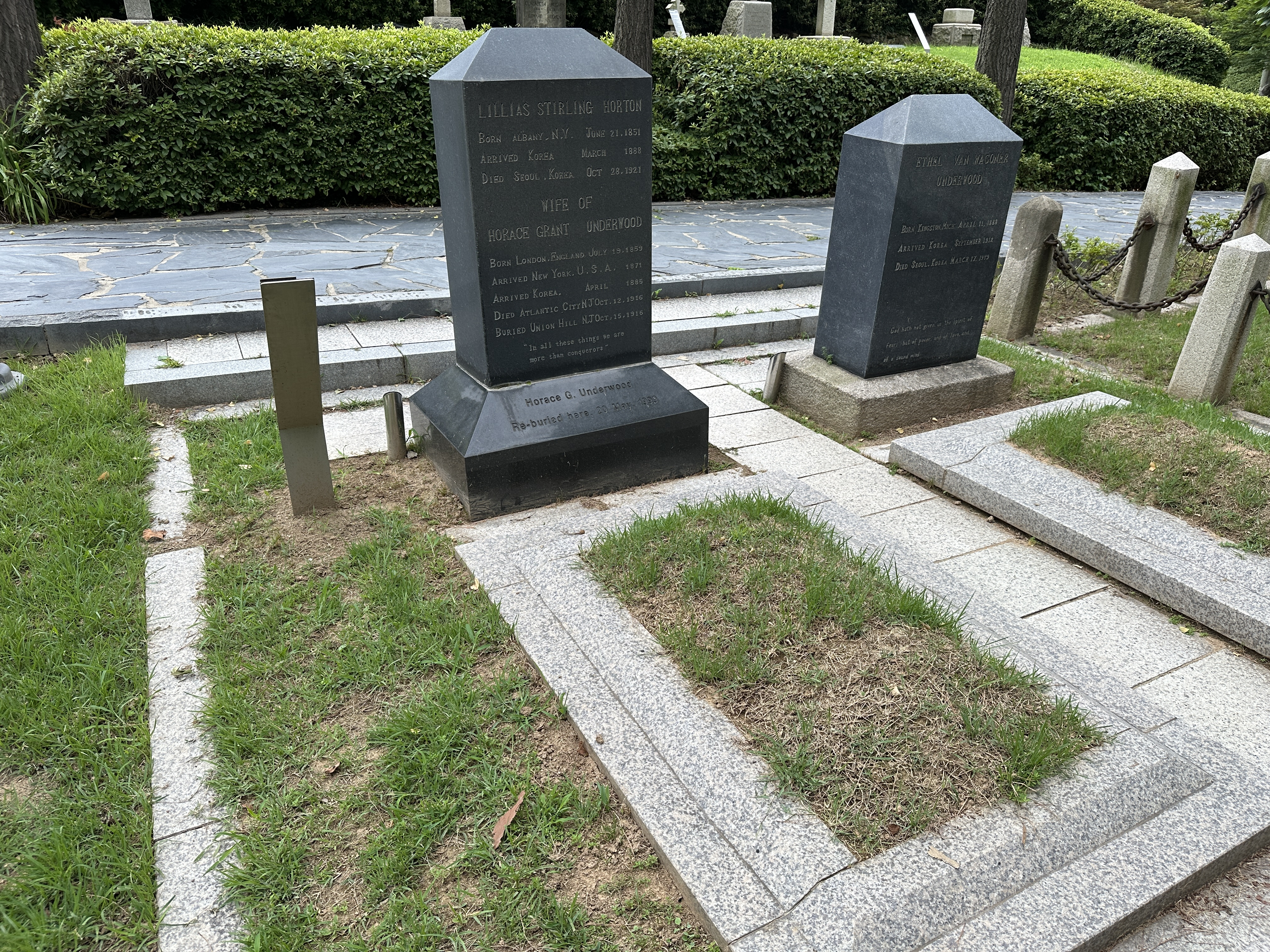
Underwood's grave in Yanghwajin Foreign Missionary Cemetery

Lillias Horton married London-born missionary Horace Grant Underwood in 1889; they had a son, Horace Horton Underwood (1890-1951), who also became a missionary in Korea. Underwood was a widow when she died in 1921, aged 70, in Korea, from the effects of tropical sprue. Her grave is in Seoul's cemetery for foreign missionaries. The Horace Grant Underwood and Lillias Horton Underwood Papers, many of them in the collections of the Presbyterian Historical Society, were published in five volumes by Yonsei University Press, between 2005 and 2010.

Underwood's grandson Horace Grant Underwood II (1917-2004) was a Korean language specialist with the United States Navy during World War II and the Korean War.
