= Park Seo-yang =

Korean physician (1885–1940)

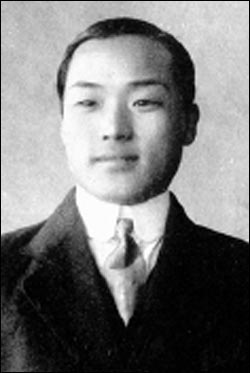
Park Seo-yang

Park Seo-yang (Korean: 박서양; Hanja: 朴瑞陽, September 30, 1885 – December 15, 1940) was a Korean early modern surgeon, doctor, chemist, and independence activist from a slave family. His real name was Bongchul (봉출) or Bongchuri (봉주리). He attended Yonsei University and was one of seven doctors who were in the first graduating class of the Severance Hospital Medical College.

== Early life ==
Seo-yang was born in Seoul, South Korea on September 30, 1885, to Park Seong-chun (Korean: 박성축; Hanja: 朴成春).

== See also ==
- Severance college
- Shin Eung-hee
- Yun Chi-wang
- Hong Seok-hoo
