= Chejungwon =

Coordinates: 37°33′46.5″N 126°56′19.8″E

Geography
- Location: South Korea

History
- Opened: 1885

Links
- Lists: Hospitals in South Korea

Chejungwon (Korean: 제중원; Hanja: 濟衆院) is a medical institution in Seoul, South Korea that is affiliated with the Yonsei University Health System. It was founded in 1885, and is considered the first Western medical institution in Korea. It became affiliated with Yonhee University, the predecessor to Yonsei University, in 1957.

== History ==
=== Establishment as Gwanghyewon ===
In 1885, during the Gapsin Coup, Min Young-ik, the nephew of Empress Myeongseong (wife of Emperor Gojong), was stabbed and seriously injured. The German diplomat Paul Georg von Möllendorff was present at the massacre and quickly requested medical care from American Dr. Horace Newton Allen, a missionary who had recently arrived. Allen was an American Presbyterian missionary who studied medicine at Miami University. Under his modern medical treatment, unknown to Korea at the time, Min recovered in three months.

Thereafter, Gojong displayed an interest in Western medicine, leading to the appointment of Allen as his personal court physician. Together, they established Gwanghyewon (광혜원; 廣惠院; lit. "House of Extended Grace" or "Widespread Relief House"), Joseon's first Western hospital, on 29 February 1885. The hospital was located in Jae-dong, Seoul.

=== Renamed as Chejungwon ===
On 12 March 1885, Gojong renamed Gwanghyewon as Chejungwon (제중원; 濟衆院; lit. "House of Universal Helpfulness"). In March 1886, sixteen men were selected as Chejungwon's first class of students to study Western medicine. Twelve of the sixteen students successfully became doctors.

=== Renamed as Severance Hospital ===
In 1893, Oliver R. Avison, a professor of the University of Toronto, became the fourth hospital director of Chejungwon. In 1900, while on furlough in North America, Avison was invited to speak at a conference of missions in New York City. Among the audience was Louis Severance, an American businessman and philanthropist from Cleveland who was connected to Standard Oil.

Severance donated a large sum of money (US$45.000) to Chejungwon, with which a new hospital was built in front of Sungnyemun. Chejungwon subsequently changed its name to "Severance Hospital" on 3 September 1904. In the same year, the hospital added the Severance Hospital Medical School and the attached School of Nursing. After Severance's death, his son, John Severance, donated an additional US$120,000 to the hospital. Severance Hospital became one of the best-equipped and most well-known hospitals in Asia.

The first seven medical licenses in Korean history were awarded to graduates of Severance Hospital Medical School on 3 June 1908: Hong Jong-eun, Kim Pil-soon, Hong Seok-hoo, Park Seo-yang, Kim Hui-yeong, Ju Hyun-cheuk and Shin Chang-hee. All seven doctors later became important figures in the construction of modern Korea.

In 1942 during Japanese occupation, the Japanese renamed the hospital and medical school as "Asahi Medical School." When Korea regained independence in 1945, the hospital officially reclaimed its name as Severance Hospital. The medical school was upgraded to "Severance Medical College" in 1947.

On 5 January 1957, the Severance Medical College was united with Yonhee University under the name of Yonsei University. The Severance Hospital is currently part of the Yonsei University Health System and affiliated with the Yonsei University College of Medicine.

== Hospital directors ==
1. Horace Newton Allen (엘런) - March 1885 to September 1887
2. John William Heron (헤론) - September 1887 to July 1890
3. Charles C. Vinton (빈튼) - April 1891 to November 1893
4. Oliver R. Avison (어비슨) - November 1893 – 1932

== Significance ==
Chejungwon was the first Western-style hospital in Korea and later evolved into the country’s first Western medical school. It played a crucial role in advancing medical care, education, and public health through its innovations and commitment to alleviating suffering while training Koreans in Western medical sciences. The nation's first medical students and licensed doctors received their education at Chejungwon, which later became Severance Hospital. Under the leadership of its directors, Chejungwon became one of the most renowned hospitals of its time and laid the foundation for modern healthcare and medical education in Korea.

== In popular culture ==
The 36-episode television series Jejungwon, starring Park Yong-woo, Han Hye-jin and Yeon Jung-hoon, aired on SBS in 2010, explore the early years of the hospital and its first medical students.

== See also ==
- Horace Newton Allen
- Yonsei University
