= Yun Chi-chang =

South Korean diplomat, politician and businessman

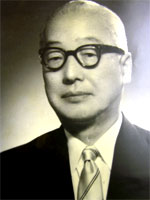
Yun Chi-chang (1949)

Yun Chi-chang (Korean: 윤치창; Hanja: 尹致昌, 1899–1973) was a South Korean diplomat, politician and businessman. Nicknamed Namgye (남계; 南桂), he was the brother of Yun Chi-wang and half-brother of Yun Chi-ho.

He was the Republic of Korea's Ambassador to the United Kingdom (1948–1951) and Ambassador extraordinary to the Middle East (1960–1961) and Ambassador to Turkey (1961–1962).
