= Oliver R. Avison =

Canadian physician (1860–1959)

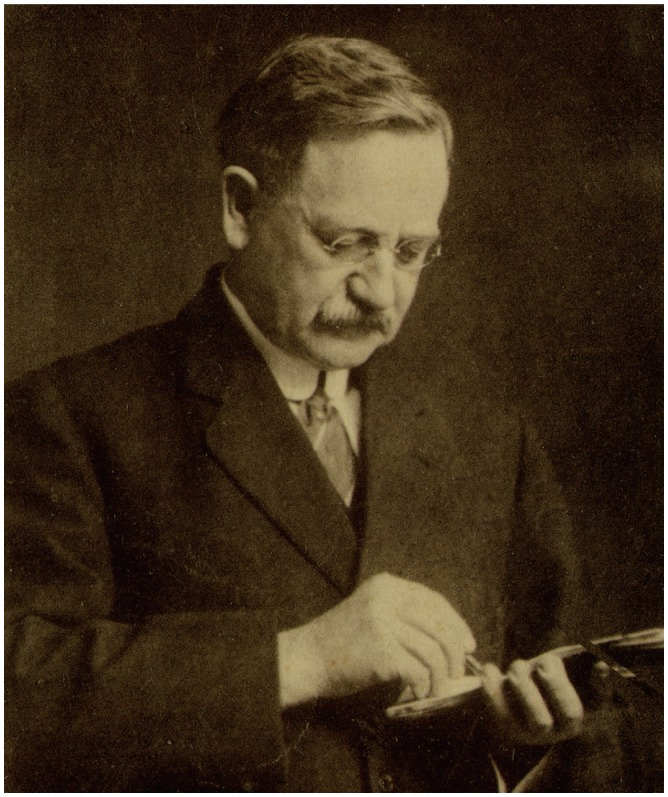
- Born: July 30, 1860; Huddersfield, Yorkshire, England
- Died: August 29, 1956 (aged 96); St. Petersburg, Florida, U.S.
- Resting place: Smiths Falls, Ontario Canada
- Education: Ontario College of Pharmacy, University of Toronto
- Occupations: Doctor, physician, medical missionary, professor, humanitarian

Oliver R. Avison (June 30, 1860 – August 29, 1956) was a Canadian doctor, physician, humanitarian, missionary and professor, who spent over four decades spreading Western medical knowledge in Korea during the Kaehwagi or Enlightenment Period. Avison was recognized for founding and opening the Severance Hospital and the Severance Medical College in Seoul in 1904, two interlinked institutions that sought to treat the sick and expose the Korean natives to the practical teachings of Western medicinal sciences. Through fundraising efforts across North America prior to the opening, Avison received a series of donations from American philanthropist Louis H. Severance, the namesake for the teaching hospital.

Avison was most known for his innovative ecumenical approach to combine the efforts of medical missionaries across various denominations, pushing against the prevailing modus operandi of foreign medical missionaries in Korea at the time. Focused on increasing collaborative efforts, Avison believed that spreading the love of God was best achieved through educational missions alongside medical ones. Avison's influences were drawn from Methodist philosophies as well as an admiration for his role model, Horace Underwood, the first Presbyterian missionary to work in Korea.

== Early life, education, and personal life ==
Oliver R. Avison was born on June 30, 1860, in Huddersfield, Yorkshire, England, the third child in the family. In 1866, Avison and his family moved to Brantford, Ontario. By 1869, Avison moved to Almonte, where he graduated from Almonte and District High School. He became a teacher at Hutton's School House, a public school close to Smiths Falls. After spending a year teaching, Avison enrolled in a preparatory school for university, with the ultimate goal of studying and teaching at the University of Toronto, from which he graduated in 1887. Avison met his wife, Jennie Barnes, while working at a drug store in Smiths Falls. They were married on July 28, 1885. Together, they moved to Korea in July 1893 under the board of Foreign Missions of the Presbyterian Church of the USA. They lived in Korea for forty years until 1934 when they were expelled by the Japanese invaders.

Avison was awarded a Gold Medal for Pharmaceutical Proficiency for his excellence in the Ontario College of Pharmacy's (OCP) qualifying examinations. Upon graduating from OCP, Avison was offered a role as an instructor. In 1887, Avison graduated from the University of Toronto with a Bachelor of Medicine, M.B.

== Missionary Work ==
=== Work in Korea ===
Avison was always involved in missionary work. He worked as a lay-preacher in Toronto, and by 1885, had helped found the YMCA at the University of Toronto, where he served as its president. Avison was also the chief editor of the Medical Missionary, a Toronto-based publication first published in 1890. Avison's missionary service experience was inspired primarily through his relationship with and admiration for Horace Underwood. Underwood was the first American Presbyterian Missionary to work in Korea in 1885. In November 1892, Avison extended an invitation to Underwood to visit him in Toronto and discuss his missionary work. Inspired by Underwood's tales, Avison contacted the Methodist Church of Canada in the hopes of being sent to Korea. His proposal was rejected. In response to this, Underwood applied on behalf of Avison to the American Presbyterian Board of Foreign Missions in New York without his permission. Frank Ellinwood, the Secretary of the Board, invited Avison to New York to discuss the application Underwood had submitted.

Despite the fact that Avison was originally a member of Sherbourne Street Methodist Church, he decided to work with the Presbyterian Board. By 1893, he was appointed as an official medical missionary. Avison was also inspired by the poor state the Korean health system was at the time, as well as the inefficiencies of the lacking collaboration between missionaries of different denominations.

Avison packed up his bags and arrived in Busan, then called Fusan, South Korea, with several young children and a pregnant Jeenie in June 1893. Jennie would birth son Douglas on July 22, 1893. By August, the family had moved to Seoul. Avison began working at Chaejungwon, the Royal Hospital. He was first appointed as a private physician to King Kojong, whose trust Avison earned upon successfully diagnosing and treating him for lacquer poisoning. Through this post, Avison was seen as governmentally endorsed by the Koreans.

The hospital in which Avison was working at was highly regulated, as the Department of Diplomatic and Commercial Affairs would send Korean government officials in to supervise. However, this was resulting in an overcrowding of the facilities. Avison petitioned for control over the hospital's operations completely independent from the government. In his demands, he expressed the desire to remodel the hospital with sole funding from the Mission Board. Through this, Avison hoped that the Korean government's intervention would cease. Only two years after his arrival to Seoul, Avison's proposal was eventually accepted. This kickstarted a new era of privatization in Korea's medical scene.

==== Cholera outbreak ====
Upon Avison's arrival in Seoul, he was highly distressed by the lacking medical awareness throughout the population. At the time, there was a great discrepancy in knowledge about the causes of disease, as superstitious beliefs ran wide. Avison's first intervention involved the public health issue of cholera. Avison and his team, appointed by the Korean Minister of Home Affairs, set out to erect educational shelters around Seoul. These facilities' purpose was to educate the population on how cholera was spread, as there was a pervasive misconception that it had to do with spirits. Avison also designed and printed over 50,000 posters with the same educational message, all in the hopes of bringing a modern medical perspective to Korea. Avison perceived these efforts to be one of his greatest achievements.

==== Creation of Severance Hospital ====
At the time, there were a variety of American missionary organizations organizing for medical missionaries to enter the country. These medical missionaries would go on to open small clinics from which they would work out of under their own supervision. There was no collaboration between the highly dispersed and independent work being done by missionaries stationed in Korea. Avison, dismayed by the lack of collaboration for reasons he did not believe to be valid, desired to resolve this conflict.

By 1899, the Avison family temporarily moved back to Canada, as both Avison and his wife fell ill. While back in Canada, Avison met with the architect Henry B. Gordon to discuss the design of blue prints for a new hospital Avison wanted to build in Korea. Upon recovering from his illness, Avison made his way to New York to speak at the Ecumenical Conference on Foreign Missions in Carnegie Hall. Louis H. Severance, a member of the audience, approached Avison and became a large financial contributor, enamored by his vision. Upon returning to Seoul, Avison purchased a 9-acre sized plot in the Todong district. Henry Gordon, the architect, arrived to Korea in June 1901 to oversee the construction site. His presence was needed due to the lack of awareness among local contractors about Western building requirements. On September 23, 1904, Avison's hospital, Severance Hospital and College, first opened its doors.

By 1934, thousands of patients had been treated in Severance Hospital. Avison also expanded the Hospital to include the first modern medical school in Korea, which is now known as Yonsei University College of Medicine. He was the principal of Severance Union Medical College and Chosen Christian College for eighteen years and integrated them to be one university. This medical education in Korea began during construction of the hospital when Avison ordered the translation of medical textbooks to Korean, and within ten years Avison saw the graduation of the nation's first seven medical students. These students also received Korea's first licenses to practice medicine. Avison's approach to providing a medical education to the local population through the hospital was exceptionally revolutionary at the time. The Severance Hospital was regarded as the "headquarters" of medicine in Korea.

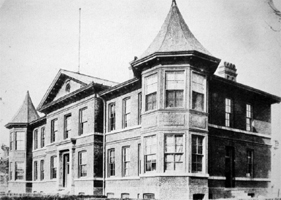
Severance Hospital in 1904

==== Medical mission theory ====
While serving as director of the House of Universal Helpfulness for six years, Avison developed a new medical mission theory. Through his speech entitled "Comity in Medical Missions," Avison presented his theory in Carnegie Hall at the 1900 Ecumenical Missionary Conference, where notable figures such as President Benjamin Harrison were in attendance. His theory consisted of three components: cooperation, the simultaneous development of a hospital and medical school, and transferring the hospital to Koreans. His talk covered the necessity for increased collaboration between the missionaries stationed in Korea, arguing that the medical work being carried out ought not to be a denominational enterprise. Instead, Avison's vision was to open a hospital in which joint efforts of all missionaries would take place. It was this idea of a united medical mission that led Severance to fund the hospital. By 1913, six differing denominations were collaborating within the hospital, sending missionaries to work there.

==== Retirement ====
Oliver and Jennie left Korea for the last time on December 6, 1935. His sons Douglas and Gordon Avison, and their families, would remain in Korea, Douglas at Severance and Gordon at a YMCA farm. Douglas may have wanted to take over Avison's position. Avison passed on his role to Dr. Keung Seon Oh, the representative of the Southern Presbyterian Mission Board for the Severance Medical College.

Upon return, Avison relocated to Florida in the United States. Jennie died on September 15, 1936. Avison outlived her by twenty years, dying at a nursing home in St. Petersburg, Florida on August 28, 1956. Both Avison and his wife were buried in Smiths Falls. In 1943, Avison remarried Agnes Gertrude Pope (nee Rennee), who died on June 2, 1958.

== Legacy ==
Avison is regarded as the founder of westernized medicine in Korea, and his medical mission theory has enabled this modern medicine to be sustained in Korea. While most of the Christian mission hospitals established in the 20th century are now closed, Severance Hospital continues to progress. By 2005, the hospital's rapid expansion led to its movement to a new building, and 2014 brought a new cancer center to the hospital. Overall, Severance Hospital has laid the foundation for modern medicine in Korea, and due to Avison's efforts, it has produced many doctors and nurses and an improvement in medical care. Fifty years after the opening of his teaching hospital, Avison's hospital helped Korea transition from being a country that received medical help from missionaries, to being a country that sent out missionaries. Avison's approach towards the local population at the time was notably secular. Avison spread Western medical practices and sciences, ultimately developing members of the indigenous population into well-trained, respected doctors, nurses and clinicians.
