= Stephen Revere =

American author (fl. 21st century)

Stephen Revere is an American author, media personality, and entrepreneur based in Seoul, South Korea.

Revere's social media marketing company Intercultural Communications is the first social media marketing company to service bilingual websites and social media advertising in Korea. He has frequently appeared on Korean TV and has published three books in the Survival Korean series.

== Background ==
After graduating in 1994 with a bachelor’s degree in philosophy, Revere backpacked through Europe to learn more about the diverse cultures and languages there. After leaving Europe, he visited South Korea, where he taught English. Revere worked as a lecturer at institutes and universities including Hanyang University in Seoul.

Revere completed intensive Korean language programs offered by Seoul National University and Yonsei University. Revere has taught in Sogang University’s Korean Language Education Center and volunteered in a position at the Yu-Rak Welfare Center, where he taught the language to foreign laborers from ten countries.

After working as editor of the English-language monthly magazine Eloquence, Revere decided to begin 10 Magazine, another monthly publication printed in English. Because Korean media ownership laws forbid foreigners from being majority shareholders in a media outlet, Revere, in partnership with Korean investors, founded 10 Magazine. Its first issue was released in October 2008. The magazine feature articles on fashion, lifestyle news, travel, and other topics of interest to those living in Korea, and also a nationwide calendar of monthly events.
