= Yonsei University =

Private university in Seoul, South Korea

Coordinates: 37.566398°N 126.938803°E

- 연세대학교
- Motto: (Latin) "Cognoscetis Veritatem et Veritas Liberabit Vos" (John 8:32) (English) "The truth will set you free" (John 8:32) 진리가 너희를 자유케 하리라. (요한복음 8:32)
- Type: Private
- Established: 1885
- Academic affiliations: AALAU, ACUCA, AEARU, APRU
- President: Yoon Dong-sup (윤동섭)
- Academic staff: 1,712 (2022)
- Administrative staff: 1,166 (2022)
- Students: 29,832 (2022)
- Undergraduates: 18,200 (2022)
- Postgraduates: 11,632 (2022)
- Location: Seodaemun District, Seoul (Sinchon Campus), Songdo, Incheon (International Campus), South Korea
- Campus: Urban
- Colours: Royal blue
- Sporting affiliations: U-League
- Mascot: Eagle
- Website: yonsei.ac.kr

Korean name
- Hangul: 연세대학교
- Hanja: 延世大學校
- RR: Yeonse daehakgyo
- MR: Yŏnse taehakkyo

Yonsei University (Korean: 연세대학교; Hanja: 延世大學校) is a private Christian research university in Seoul, South Korea. Yonsei University is one of the three most prestigious universities in the country, part of a group referred to as SKY universities.

Yonsei University traces its roots to the first modern medical center in Korea, Gwanghyewon (Korean: 광혜원; Hanja: 廣惠院; lit. 'House of Extended Grace') founded in April 1885, now Severance Union Medical College. The institution in its current university form was established in January 1957 through the union of Yonhi College (연희전문학교; 延禧專門學校) and Severance. As a tribute, the name "Yonsei" was derived from the first syllables of the names of its two parent institutions, "Yon; 연; 延" from Yonhi College and "Sei; 세; 世" from Severance Union Medical College. Yonhi College was one of the first modern colleges, founded as Chosun Christian College (조선기독교대학; 朝鮮基督教大學) in March 1915. The union was a result of a lasting bilateral cooperation between the colleges that began in the 1920s. The institutions were the first of their kinds in Korea.

The student body consists of 18,200 undergraduate students, 11,632 graduate students, 4,518 faculty members, 6,788 staff, and 257,931 alumni. Yonsei University operates its main campus in Seoul and offers graduate, postgraduate, and doctoral programs in Korean and English.

== History ==
=== Beginnings (1885–1916) ===
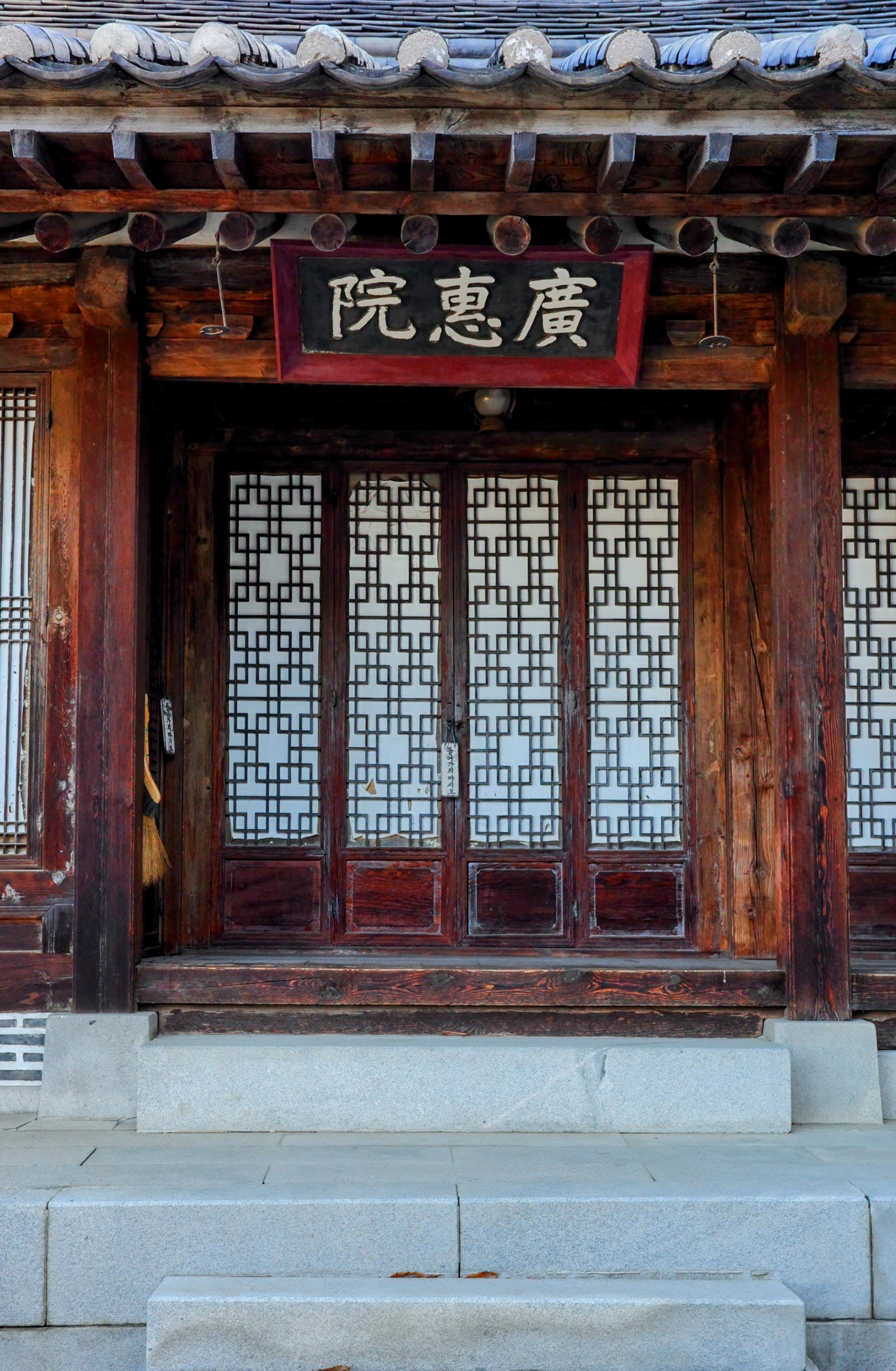
Gwanghyewon's main door and engravings

The Yonsei University Medical School dates to April 10, 1885, when the first modern hospital to practice Western medicine in Korea, Gwanghyewon, was established. The hospital was founded by Horace Newton Allen, the American Protestant missionary appointed to Korea by the Presbyterian Church in the USA. The hospital was renamed Chejungwon on April 26. As there appeared difficulties, the church appointed Canadian Oliver R. Avison to run Chejungwon on July 16, 1893. Gwanghyewon was financed at first by the Korean government, while the medical staff was provided by the church. However, by 1894 when the First Sino-Japanese War and Gabo reforms took place, the government was not able to continue its financial support, thus management of Chejungwon came fully under the church. In 1899, Avison returned to the US and attended a conference of missionaries in New York City where he elaborated on the medical project in Korea. Louis Severance, a businessman and philanthropist from Cleveland, Ohio, was present and was deeply moved. He later paid for the major portion of the construction costs of new buildings for the medical facility. Chejungwon was renamed Severance Hospital after him.

Chejungwon (later Severance Hospital) was primarily a hospital, but it also performed medical education as an attachment. The hospital admitted its first class of 16 medical students selected through examinations in 1886, one year after its establishment. By 1899, Chejungwon Medical School was independently recognized. Following the increase of diversity in missionary denominations in Korea, collaboration began to form. Chejungwon began to receive medical staff, school faculty, and financial support from the Union Council of Korean Missionaries (한국연합선교협의회; 韓國聯合宣敎協議會) in 1912. Accordingly, the medical school was renamed as Severance Union Medical College in 1913.

The rest of Yonsei University traces its origins to Chosun Christian College, which was founded on March 5, 1915, by an American Protestant missionary, Horace Grant Underwood sent by the church. Underwood became the first president, and Avison became the vice president. It was located at the YMCA. Courses began in April with 81 students and 18 faculty members.

Underwood died of illness on October 12, 1916, and Avison took over as president.

=== During World Wars I and II (1916–1946) ===
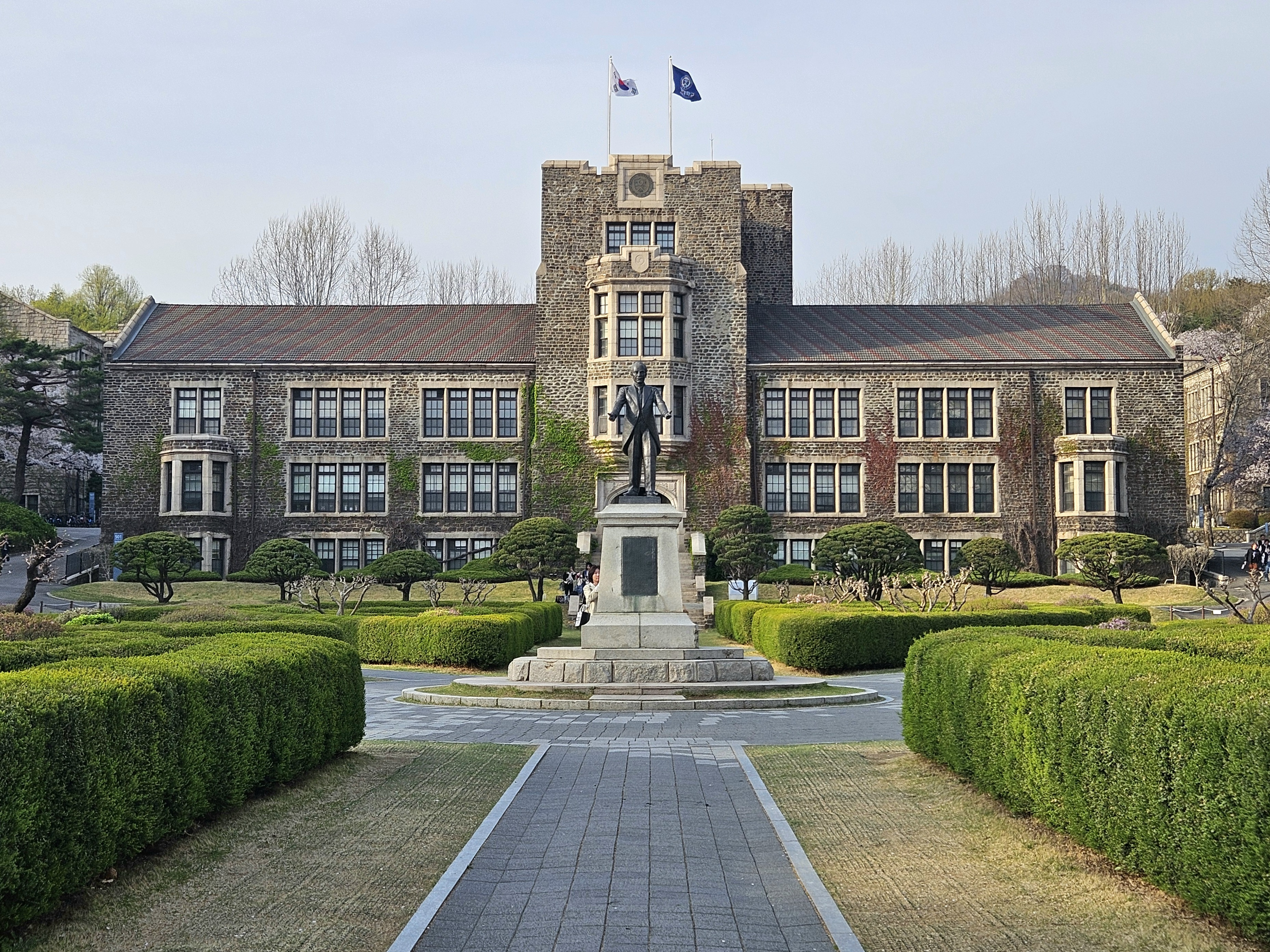
Underwood Hall, which houses administrative offices

On August 22, 1910, Japan annexed Korea with the Japan–Korea Treaty of 1910. The first Governor-General of Korea, Terauchi Masatake, introduced the Ordinance on Chosun Education (조선교육령; 朝鮮敎育令) in 1911, and subsequently Regulations on Professional Schools (전문학교 규칙) and Revised Regulations on Private Schools (개정사립학교 규칙) in March, 1915. These were intended to stifle private education in Korea; any establishment of schools, any change in school regulations, location, purpose, coursework, or textbooks must all be reported to and authorized by the governor-general, and all courses must be in Japanese.

Severance Union College struggled to meet these requirements; school regulations and coursework were altered, faculty evaluated and enlarged, its foundation and its board clarified. It received its recognition as a professional medical school on May 14, 1917. (Note: Oshima (大島正健) was a Japanese Severance faculty member teaching ethics who made considerable contributions to this outcome.) In 1922 the governor-general Makoto Saito issued Revised Ordinance on Chosun Education (개정조선교육령). It called for stricter qualifications for the faculty, and Severance complied and further recruited more members with degrees from accredited institutions in North America and Europe. Japan did not completely ignore the competence of this institution; in 1923, Severance recovered its right to give medical licenses to its graduates without state examination, a right that had been lost since 1912. Moreover, in March 1934, the Japanese Ministry of Education and Culture further recognized Severance in allowing its graduates the right to practice medicine anywhere in Japanese sovereignty. Oh Geung Seon (오긍선; 吳兢善) became the first Korean president of Severance in 1934.

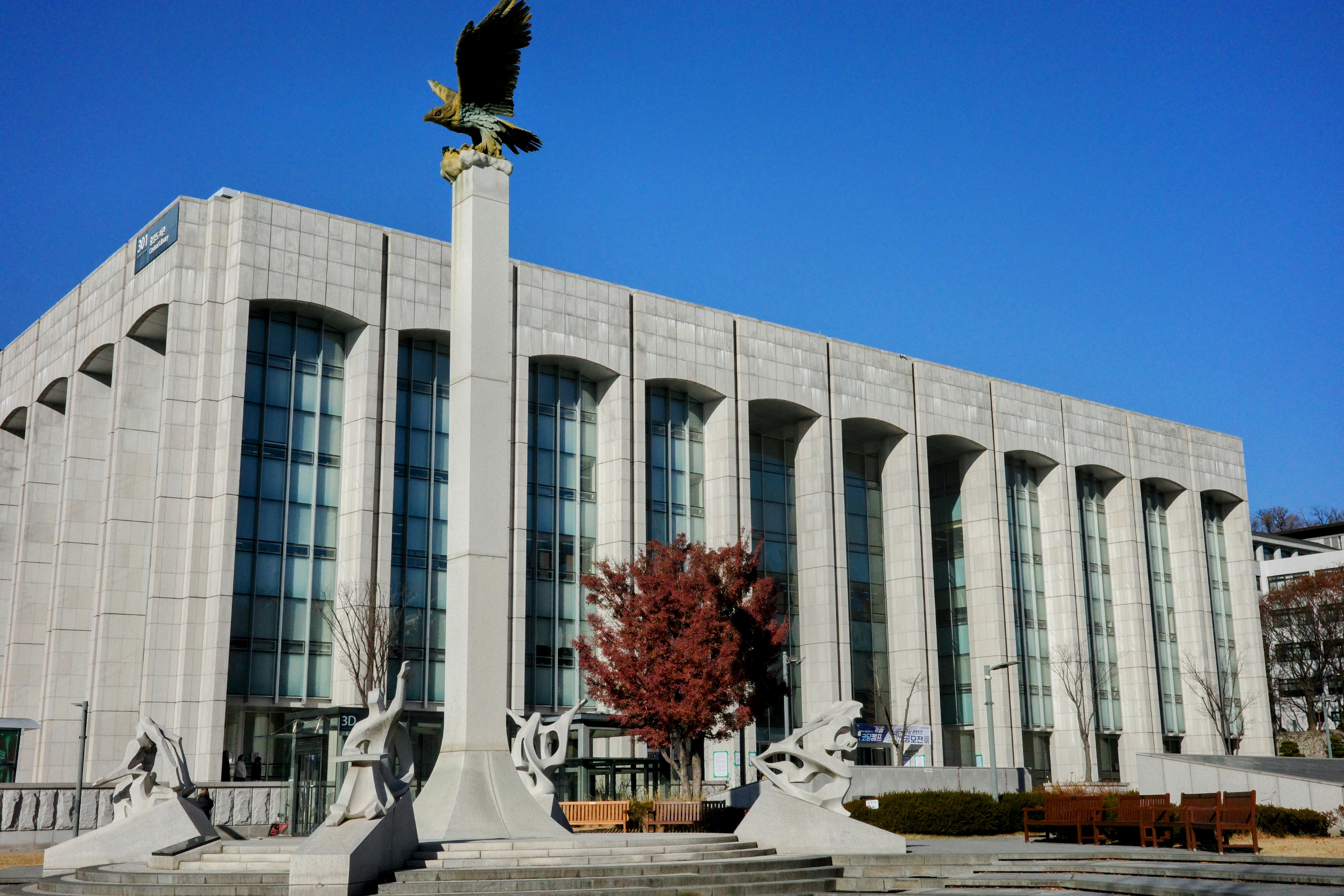
The Eagle Statue and Main Library at Yonsei University Campus

Ordinances in 1915 and 1922 also affected the fate of Chosun Christian College. Intended as a college, it was not legally recognized as such, since the Ordinance of 1915 did not allow the establishment of Korean private colleges. Hence, Chosun Christian College, now renamed Yonhi College, was accepted only as a "professional school" on April 17, 1917, by then a joint project from diverse missionary denominations. However, Yonhi College had formed the organization and faculty becoming a university. It consisted of six departments: humanities, agriculture, commerce, theology (this department did not open due to differences among the founding denominations), mathematics and physics, and applied chemistry. The ordinances, furthermore, prohibited coursework in Korean history, its geography, or in the Bible outside the department of theology. The council of missionaries reacted with A Resolution on the Revised Educational Ordinance (개정교육령에 관한 결의문), which carefully pointed out that Japan did not apply such rigorous absurdities to its private schools in mainland Japan.

After the March First Independence Movement swept the peninsula in 1919, Japan somewhat relaxed its grip on Korea, and this is reflected in the Ordinance of 1922. It ceased the arbitrary control of governor-general over the coursework and the qualification of faculty members, and altered its stance on strict separation of religion from all education. It also recognized Yonhi College as a professional school equal to its counterparts in Japan, and permitted the Christian programs and the Bible in its coursework. Nevertheless, Japanese literature became mandatory. (Note: The Ordinance (1922) was commonly viewed to have an ulterior political motive, not as genuine effort to improve education.) Under Japanese intervention, Korean history was taught under the name Eastern History, and the Korean language was taught whenever possible. (Note: Faculty members including Choi Hyun Bae, Lee Yun Jae, Jung In Seo, Yu Eok Kyum, and Baek Nak-jun contributed to this end.) The Department of Agriculture was closed after 1922 when its first graduates left Yonhi College. Efforts were made to revive this department, without much success. However, Yonhi College installed a training center for agricultural leaders on campus and its programs saw large numbers of participants. Yonhi College was liberal in its admission of non-Christians. Its policy was to admit non-Christians relatively freely and allow the majority of Christian students to gradually influence and assimilate them.

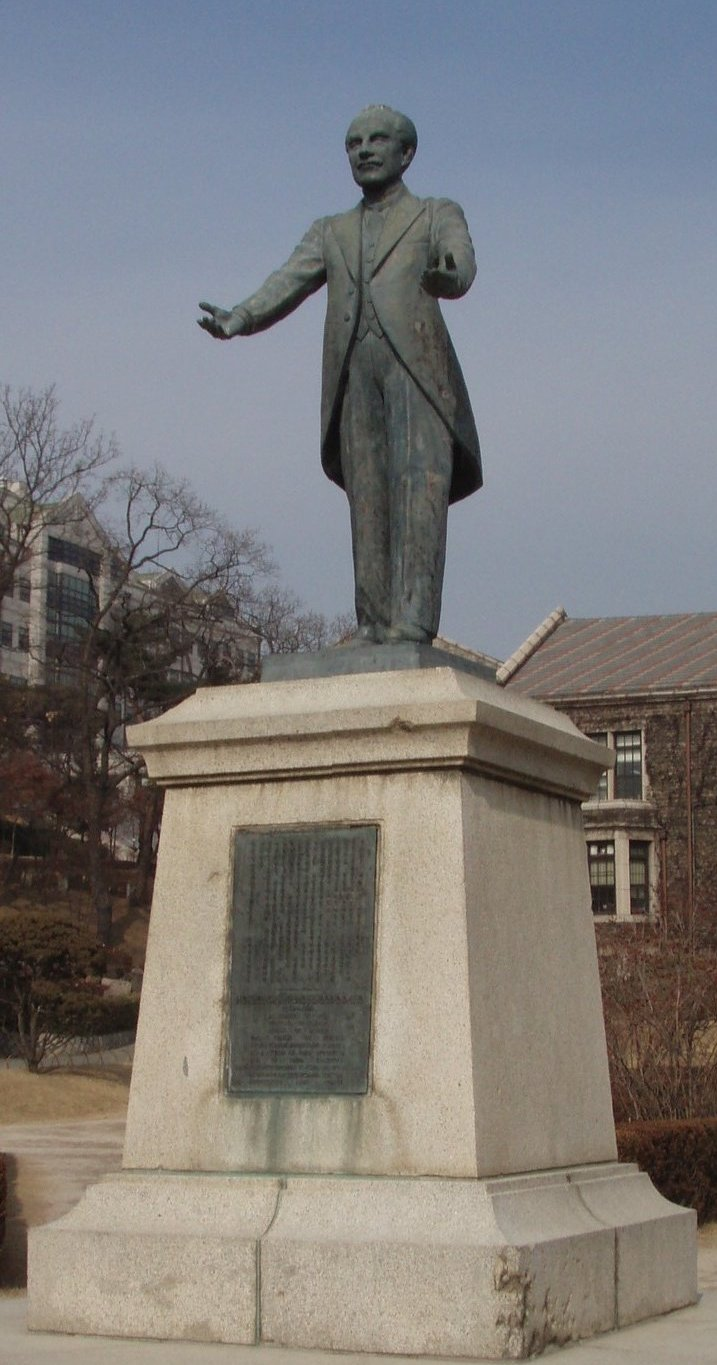
Statue of Underwood

In the late 1930s, Japan again shifted its policy towards Korea to incorporate it into its scheme of expansionism. In August 1936, the new Japanese Governor-General Jirō Minami began the assimilation of Koreans, to exploit them for military purposes; The governor-general enforced Sōshi-kaimei and Shinto on Koreans, and began to recruit Koreans for Japanese war efforts. In April 1938, the third Ordinance on Chosun Education ordered the acceptance of Shinto, the voluntary removal of the Korean language in coursework, and further intensification of Japanese and Japanese history education. Yonhi Professional School did not follow suit and opened courses on the study of the Korean language in November 1938. This was not tolerated for long: In March 1940, Yonhi College was forced to open courses in Japanese studies for each department and each year. In 1938, English classes began to come under pressure following a deterioration of relations between Japan and the United States; coursework in English was forbidden and texts of English writers were censored. In 1938, President H.H. Underwood accepted the practice of Shinto to avoid the potential closure of Yonhi College. Governors-General pushed Yonhi College to refuse financial support from United States and financial difficulties mounted. American and British trustees and instructors were removed from the school in December 1941 upon the beginning of the Pacific War, and the government took direct control of the school in August 1942.

=== During the Korean War (1946–1952) ===
Severance was approved as a college by the liberated Korean government in 1947. Since most medical institutions in Korea were run by the Japanese, medical staff and faculty were in short supply after their departure. Thus, many members of Severance staff and faculty left to assist other institutions. Severance took up the role of student leadership and was outspoken against US-Soviet occupation. In 1950, during the outbreak of the Korean War, Severance functioned as a field hospital until Seoul was overrun. Severance fled quickly, but some faculty members and students were unable to leave in time; some were killed and others were captured then exploited by the advancing North Koreans. Severance seniors joined the military as army surgeons. Although Severance returned to Seoul for a while after its recapture, it had to flee again on December 17, 1950, carrying its medical equipments on a LST: Severance departed from Incheon and arriving in Busan and eventually relocating to Geoje and maintained a presence there until 1952. When Severance arrived in Busan, its medical school joined the wartime college, a temporary body. Meanwhile, the Severance facility in Seoul received heavy damage, as it was in the center of the city near Seoul Station. Severance Hospital again returned on April 1, 1952, and its medical college on June 12, 1952.

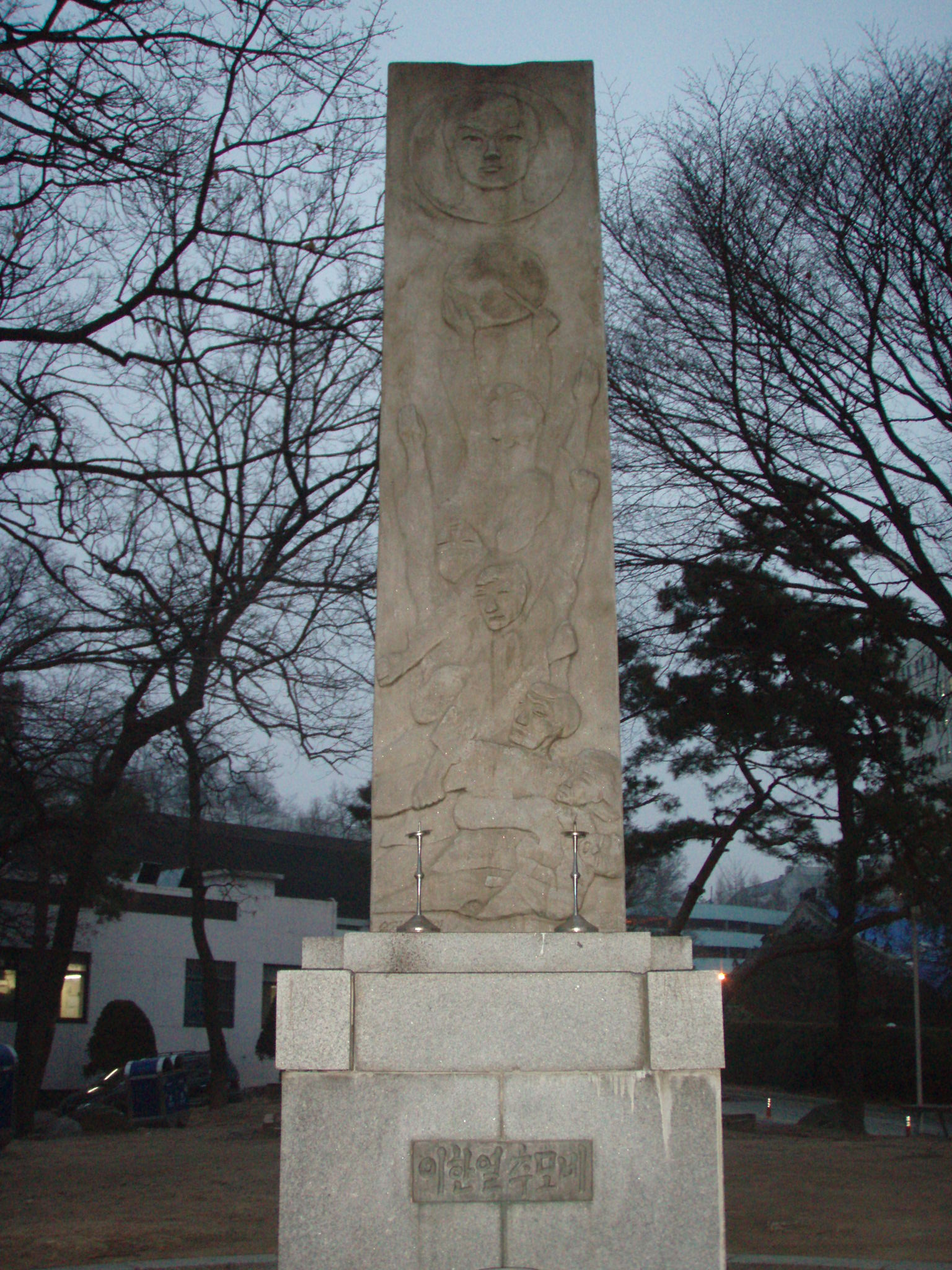
Lee Han Yeol Memorial

The US military neglected the restitution of Yonhi College and held other plans to use it as a military hospital or judiciary training center. With time, nevertheless, Yonhi College came to be viewed as a missionary institution that was dispossessed by the governor-general. Yonhi College was able to open its doors again on January 21, 1946, and, on August 15, 1946, was recognized as a university. In December 1948, plans for the unification of Yonhi College and Severance began to take form. (Note: This included Ewha University. Ewha University fell out asserting its independent goal in the education of women.) The Graduate School was formed in July 1950.

On May 10, 1950, Yonhi College graduated the first post-colonial class, however in June all progress came to a halt due to the Korean War. The university suspended all courses on June 27 and recruited student soldiers. The North Korean military advanced into the Yonhi College campus and established its headquarters there. This was a cause of severe damage to the campus when the US military recaptured Seoul in September. The university reopened following the recapture of Seoul, but it was once more on the run to Busan in December. In February 1951, Yonhi College joined the wartime college, however, it kept an independent body and opened its own courses on October 3, 1951. On April 15, 1953, Yonhi College began its work on restoration; it returned to its campus in the fall.

=== Postwar (1953–1959) ===
In 1957, Severance Medical College and Hospital and Yonhi University merged to form Yonsei University.

== Academics ==
=== Reputation ===
University rankings
JoongAng National	Domestic	2
QS National	General	2
THE National	General	3
USNWR National	General	2
ARWU National	Research	2–3
QS Asia (Asia version)	General	9
THE Asia (Asia version)	General	=19
USNWR Asia	General	42
ARWU World	Research	151–200
QS World	General	50
THE World	General	86
USNWR World	General	=180

Yonsei University is one of Korea's three "SKY" universities, which are the most prestigious in the country, with the other members being Seoul National University and Korea University. Admission of these "SKY" universities is extremely competitive. Acceptance rate of Yonsei University in early admission (수시) is below 1%. In general, exhibiting 0.5% of academic achievement (Korean SAT) is needed to apply for Yonsei regular admission (정시). Inside Korea, admission to a SKY university is widely considered as a determination of one's career and social status.

=== World rankings ===
Yonsei University was ranked 42nd in the QS World University Rankings 2027. In the QS World University Rankings: Asia 2026, Yonsei ranked 11th in Asia and was the highest-ranked university in South Korea.

Yonsei was ranked 86th in the Times Higher Education World University Rankings 2026. In the 2026 Academic Ranking of World Universities (ARWU), published by ShanghaiRanking, Yonsei was placed in the 151–200 range worldwide. The Center for World University Rankings ranked Yonsei 142nd worldwide and second in South Korea in its 2026 rankings.

=== Colleges and programs ===
==== Undergraduate ====
- College of Liberal Arts
- College of Commerce and Economics
- School of Business
- College of Science
- College of Engineering
- College of Life Science and Biotechnology
- College of Computing
- College of Theology
- College of Social Sciences
- College of Music
- College of Human Ecology
- College of Science in Education
- University College
- Underwood International College
- College of Medicine
- College of Dentistry
- College of Nursing
- College of Pharmacy
- Global Leaders College

==== Postgraduate ====
- Graduate School (Sinchon/International Campuses)
- United Graduate School of Theology
- Graduate School of International Studies
- Graduate School of Information
- Graduate School of Communication and Arts
- Graduate School of Social Welfare
- Graduate School of Business Administration
- Graduate School of Education
- Graduate School of Public Administration
- Graduate School of Engineering
- Graduate School of Journalism and Mass Communication
- Graduate School of Law
- Graduate School of Human Environmental Sciences
- Graduate School of Economics
- Law School
- Graduate School of Health and Environment

==== Severance Hospital divisions ====
- Severance Hospital (Sinchon)
- Gangnam Severance Hospital
- Yongin Severance Hospital
- Songdo Severance Hospital (under construction as of 2024)

==== Notable international programs ====
- Yonsei International Summer School

Yonsei International Summer School (YISS), usually held from late June to early August, started in 1985, and it has grown to over 2,000 students from over 30 countries.

- Winter Abroad at Yonsei

Winter Abroad at Yonsei (WAY) is a relatively new program, started 2013. The winter program is a 3-week program which runs from late December to early January.

- Study Abroad at Yonsei

Yonsei University's Exchange/Visiting Student Programs offer opportunities to students who plan to study for a year or a semester in Korea.

== Culture ==
=== University symbols ===
The "ㅇ" and "ㅅ" in Yonsei University's arms are derived from the first letters of "연세" ("Yonsei" in Korean). The circle "ㅇ" represents the ideal of a complete and well-rounded person, while the "ㅅ" symbolizes the upward-looking pursuit for scholarly excellence. In addition, the "ㅇ" stands for Heaven; the "-" represents the horizon of the Earth and "ㅅ" signifies "man," as expressed in the Chinese character (人). The open book stands for truth; the torchlight signifies freedom; and the arms, as a whole, protects these two core principles of Yonsei University.

Yonsei University's mascot is an eagle, and its color is "royal blue".

=== Christianity ===
Yonsei University is founded on Christian principles and purporting to "produce Christian leaders with the spirits of freedom and truth". The Christian character of the university is well illustrated by its history as a school founded by American Protestant missionaries and by its school motto from the Bible, "The truth will set you free" (John 8:32). As of 2007, the Board of directors of Yonsei University should include a member from four Korean Christian organizations: The Presbyterian Church of Korea (대한예수교장로회), the Presbyterian Church in the Republic of Korea (한국기독교장로회), the Korean Methodist Church (기독교대한감리회), and the Anglican Church of Korea (대한성공회). In Korea and Japan, Christian schools founded by Christian organizations or individuals, especially by Western missionaries, such as Yonsei University, are commonly called mission schools.

A school's founding ideology and a student's freedom of religion has been debated in South Korean society for some time. As of 2009, a student does not have to be an active Christian to be admitted to Yonsei University.

In 2010, Yonsei University entered an agreement with The United Methodist Church, in which the university will serve as the regional office for the Methodist Global Education Fund for Leadership Development.

== Student life ==
A large number of Yonsei degree programs, including UIC, ASD, and GSIS (in Seoul and YIC) have extensive tuition scholarships for international students that cover tuition and accommodation.

Akaraka is the official college festival for Yonsei students that is usually held on May. During the festival, many prominent singers and celebrities perform.

It is strictly forbidden by the university code of conduct to discriminate against students from non-Christian backgrounds. As a missionary school, Yonsei undergraduates used to be required to attend weekly chapel service for four semesters to qualify for graduation, however this is no longer the case.

=== Clubs ===
There are more than 100 clubs at Yonsei University; the clubs listed here do not represent all clubs on campus.

- AFKN Listener's Club (ALC) is one of the largest and oldest Major Korean-International exchange student clubs in Yonsei University. Having the biggest club room in Yonsei, students in ALC play dramas and various activities with foreign students. The club is also famous for its featuring at Reply 1994: The club room characters spend their time is ALC's.
- Avenante is the only mixed choir in Yonsei University, composed of both music and non-music majors. Concerts are given twice a year. The club practices songs in many genres, from Missa Solemnis to pop songs to traditional Korean songs.
- Business Innovation Track (BIT) is a track aiming to foster innovative young generation regardless of the field they are studying.
- CogSci:In is a society studying cognitive science. There are four teams such as psychology, humanities and social science, applied science and neurobiology in CogSci:In. Each semester, two topics related to cognitive science are presented and each team makes a presentation every week about the topics. Members of CogSci:IN can get an integrated and in-depth understanding of each topic.
- The Global Management Track (GMT) is officially supported by the School of Business to systemically discover and train talented business major students. Founded in 1996, with the goal of globalization and a motto of passion, it has addressed many diverse topics worldwide and has increased the business competency of each of its individual members.
- International Yonsei Community (IYC) was founded in 1995 for global, multicultural exchange in the Yonsei society, including among the hundreds of students on campus from around the world. It upholds a universal idea of contributing to the worldwide foundation of wisdom and knowledge; overcoming cultural, racial and academic gaps; and promoting unity based on deep understanding.
- Junior Scholar Club (JSC) is an academic club founded in 1999 that aims to prepare students for academic and research-related careers. JSC consists of business, economics, and humanities & social science chapters for sophomores and above, and a preparatory chapter for freshmen students.
- The Yonsei Annals is the official English press of Yonsei University, founded in 1962. It is one of the top-rated English university monthly magazines in Korea and is run entirely by Yonsei University undergraduates. Many Annals alumni have gone on to careers in journalism, broadcasting, and politics. Annals alumnae and alumni include among others former Minister of Foreign Affairs Kang Kyung-wha, former KBS News 9 main anchor Min Kyung-wook, and Dr. Sunkyo Kwon, editor of the world's most authoritative volumes on Gero(n)technology. Currently, the Annals publishes an issue every month. Each includes one or more column from the five divisions: Campus Reporting Division, Current Affairs, Photo, and Culture. The Annals is a nonprofit organization that is funded by the university. All decisions on content and day-to-day operations are made by the editorial board composed of the editor-in-chief and the editors of each divisions. There have been some occasions when guest editors were brought in to help develop the magazine.
- Yonsei Financial Leaders (YFL) is one of the largest and oldest finance clubs in Yonsei University, founded in 1998. It has a focus on fixed income, corporation valuation and derivatives. To date in Oct 2022, more than 500 alumni from YFL work in fields within finance including, and not limited to, investment banking, sales and trading, private equity, real estate, research, infrastructure.
- Yonsei European Studies (YES). Initially organized by honorary editor-in-chief Siyoung Choi (Department of Law, Class of 08) under the name of Yonsei European Society or EU society in May 2011, the Yonsei European Studies Editorial Board publishes the South Korea's only and oldest ISSN-registered bilingual (Korean/English) undergraduate journal Yonsei European Studies or YES (ISSN 2287-450X). Since its first issue in August 2012, YES, featuring research papers on European and international affairs, has been delivered biannually to the National Library of Korea, Korea National Assembly Library, Yonsei University Library and highly selective libraries of US/UK universities and institutions.

=== Athletics ===
Yonsei University is a member of the Korea University Sports Federation (KUSF) and its men's football/soccer, men's basketball, baseball and men's ice hockey teams participate in the KUSF U-League. Its mascot is the eagle and its student-athletes are thus informally known as "Eagles".

==== Rivalry with Korea University ====
Each claiming to be the best private university in South Korea, Yonsei University and Korea University have had a long-standing athletic rivalry. The rivalry is well-illustrated by famous annual sports matches between them. This event, starting in 1925, is called KoYon Jeon (고연전; 高延戰) when Korea University hosts the matches and YonKo Jeon (연고전; 延高戰) when Yonsei University hosts the matches. However, the above official name is actually used only for official appearances such as broadcasting and newspaper reports. 'YonKo Jeon' is commonly used in Yonsei University and 'KoYon Jeon' is generally used in Korea University. The annual one-time matches include soccer, baseball, basketball, rugby, and ice hockey. With the founding of the U-League, the two institutions also meet in the league matches for all sports except rugby.

The events draw large numbers of student spectators, as well as celebrities and professional athletes. Prior to the YonKo Jeon, students from both universities also gather for the Yonsei-Korea University Joint Cheering Event (합동응원전) where students practice their cheers and show school spirit.

Until 2012, Yonsei recorded 18 winning seasons, 8 draws, and 16 losses. In 2012, out of the five sports, Yonsei University lost three (baseball, basketball, soccer) and won two (ice hockey, rugby). In 2017, Yonsei university won all five games. In 2018, Yonsei university won three games (rugby, soccer and basketball) and lost one (ice hockey). Baseball was cancelled due to the rain. In 2020, all sports matches were cancelled due to the COVID-19 outbreak.

== Campuses ==
Yonsei University Seoul Campus is composed of Sinchon Campus and International Campus in Songdo, Incheon. From 2011, Yonsei University adopted a Residential College (RC) Program at the Yonsei International Campus (YIC). Most freshmen of Yonsei University are required to live in an International Campus dormitory and complete RC programs for a year. After that, they move on to the Sinchon campus in Seoul to complete their education.

=== Sinchon Campus ===
Yonsei's Sinchon Campus covers 250-acre (100 ha) located about 6 km off west of central Seoul. The Sinchon Campus is home to most of the academic departments of Yonsei University, and has a combination of historical and high-tech buildings.

=== Yonsei International Campus (Songdo, Incheon) ===
Based on the May 8, 2006 agreement between the city of Incheon and Yonsei University, the Yonsei Songdo Global Academic Complex (now the Yonsei International Campus) is an anchor of the R&D aspect for the Songdo district and the Korean education and research industries. Construction was in two phases with the first phase including the Global Campus, Joint University Campus, R&D Campus, and the Global Academic Village. Phase one was completed in 2010 and phase two began the next year in 2011 with further expansion. Currently, most freshmen of Yonsei University stay at the International Campus for one year to complete their RC program requirements. In addition to freshmen education, a number of academic programs are offered at the Yonsei International Campus, including undergraduate and graduate programs offered from the School of Integrated Technology (College of Computing), College of Pharmacy, Humanities, Arts, and Social Sciences Division (Underwood International College), Integrated Science and Engineering Division (Underwood International College). The dormitory of the International Campus is composed of 12 houses. Until 2013, there were eight houses: Avison, Yun Dong-Joo, Muak, Yoongjae, Underwood, Baek Yang, Appenzeller (previously Aristotle), and Allen. In 2014, four more houses were founded: Evergreen, Wonchul, Chi Won, and Cheongsong.

- Evergreen House
- Wonchul House: Named after Lee Wonchul, alumnus of Yonsei University and first Korean medical doctor.
- Underwood House: Named after Horace Grant Underwood, the founder of Yonsei University.
- Yun, Dong-Joo House: Named after a famous poet, Yun Dong-Joo, a Yonsei University alumnus.
- Muak House: Named after the mountain near the Sinchon campus.
- Chi Won House: Chi Won is the name of the oldest building in Yonsei University (built in 1918).
- Yongjae House: Named after the first president of Yonsei University, Yongjae Baek Nak-jun.
- Avison House: Oliver R. Avison was a missionary who was the first to spread western medical knowledge in Korea and the founder of Severance Hospital.
- Baek Yang House: Named after the main street of the Sinchon campus (Baek Yang Ro)
- Cheongsong House: Cheongsong is the name of a forest at the Sinchon campus.
- Allen International House: Horace N. Allen is a medical missionary and founded Gwanghyewon, the first western-style hospital in Korea.
- Appenzeller International House: Formerly named after the philosopher Aristotle, it is now named Appenzeller International House.

== Notable alumni ==
Graduates of Yonsei University include a Nobel laureate, an Academy Award winner, Olympians, and a Fulkerson Prize-winning mathematician.

=== Business ===
- Koo Bon-moo: Former Chairman of LG Group
- Kim Woo-jung: Founder and CEO of Daewoo Group
- Baek Jong-won: CEO of The Born Group
- Park Ji-won (businessman): Former CEO of HYBE
- Suh Kyung-bae: Chairman of TaePyongyang Corporation
- Song Ja: Former President of Yonsei University and current CEO of Daekyo
- Chung Mong-hun: Former Chairman of Hyundai Group
- Lee Boo-jin: President and chief executive of Hotel Shilla (Samsung Group)

=== Literature and arts ===
- Han Kang: Novelist, 2024 Nobel Prize in Literature
- Yun Dong-ju: Poet and Korean independence movement activist
- Gi Hyeong-do: Poet
- Stephen Revere: Magazine editor and television personality
- Eun Hee-kyung: Novelist
- Kim Yoo-jung: Novelist
- Jang Cheol-mun: Poet
- Choi In-ho: Writer
- Yun Humyong: Novelist and poet
- Gong Ji-young: Novelist
- Choi Jae-hoon: Writer
- Park Hyun-wook: Writer
- Heo Yeon: Poet

=== Politics, government, and public service ===
- Han Seung-soo: Former President of 56th United Nations General Assembly and Prime Minister of South Korea
- Kang Kyung-wha: Foreign Minister of South Korea

=== Academics ===
- T. K. Seung: Philosopher and the Jesse H. Jones Professor in Liberal Arts, at the University of Texas at Austin
- Dean L. Hubbard: President of Northwest Missouri State University
- Suh Jin-suck: Medical professor
- Jeong Han Kim: Mathematician, recipient of the 1997 Fulkerson Prize
- Sunkyo Kwon: Creator of the leading sources on gerontechnology
- Yong Pil Rhee: Political systems scientist
- Sung-Mo Kang: President, KAIST
- Eui-Cheol Shin: Immunologist, medical researcher and academic
- Marvin Chun: Dean of Yale College

=== Sports ===
- Chang Woe-ryong: Soccer manager of Omiya Ardija
- Choi Dong-won: Former baseball pitcher of Lotte Giants
- Choi Min-jeong: South Korean short track speed skater who won a gold medal at PyeongChang 2018 Olympics
- Chun Lee-kyung: Four-time Olympic Gold Medalist in Short Track Skating & Member of the International Olympic Committee Athletes' Commission
- Heo Hoon: Basketball player of Suwon KT Sonicboom
- Heo Ung: Basketball player of Wonju DB Promy
- Huh Jung-moo: Former soccer player and former head coach of Korean National Soccer team
- Hwang Ui-jo: Footballer who plays as an attacker for Norwich City
- Jiyai Shin: Professional Golfer: 2007 KPGA Golfer of the Year and 2009 LPGA Tour money leader
- Kim Min-jae: Soccer Defender of Bayern Munich
- Kim Yong-dae: Soccer goalkeeper of FC Seoul
- Lee Dae-hoon: Two-time Olympic Medalist in Taekwondo
- Lee Sang-min: Basketball player of Seoul Samsung Thunders
- Lee Yu-bin: South Korean short track speed skater
- Park Chul-soon: Former baseball pitcher of Doosan Bears
- Ryu So-yeon: Professional golfer, winner of 2011 U.S. Women's Open
- Seo Jang Hoon: Basketball player
- Shin Dong-pa: Basketball player, was on the team that won the 1969 ABC Championship and the top scorer at the 1970 FIBA World Championship
- Si Woo Kim: South Korean golfer
- Son Yeon-jae: First Korean rhythmic gymnast to win gold in the World Cup series (at the 2014 Lisbon World Cup) / fifth place in Gymnastics at the 2012 Summer Olympics – Women's rhythmic individual all-around
- Yu Ki-sang: Basketballer

=== Entertainment ===
- Ahn Jae-wook: Actor
- Ahn Ji-hyun: Actress
- Ahn Nae-sang: Actor
- Bae Chang-ho: Director
- Bae Da-hae (배다해): Singer
- Bong Joon-ho: Academy Award winning director
- Choi Song-hyun: Actress
- Go Joo-won: Actor
- Han Jae-suk: Actor
- Han Jin-hee: Actor
- Choi Soo-jin or Horan: Singer (Clazziquai and Ibadi), radio DJ, and author
- Hur Jin-ho: Director
- Im Sang-soo: Director
- Jun Hyun-moo: Former KBS announcer; television host
- Kim Dong-ryool: Singer-songwriter (Exhibition)
- Kim Sung-kyung: Actress
- Kim Yong-gun: Actor
- Lee Ah-hyun: Actress
- Lee Sung-gang: Director
- Luhan: Actor, singer
- Na Woon-gyu: Actor, screenwriter and director
- Na Young-seok: Producer, director
- Nam Hye-seung: Musical director and composer
- Oh Sang-jin: News anchor and actor
- Park Gyu-young: Actress
- Park Heung-sik: Movie director
- Park Jin-hee: Actress
- Park Jin-young: Singer, actor, producer, founder of JYP Entertainment
- Park Romi: Singer and actress
- Park Sae-byul: Singer
- Shin Hyun-joon: Actor and professor
- Song Ok-sook: Actress
- Woo Hyun: Actor
- Yoo Yoonjin: Twitch Streamer known as Jinnytty
- Yoon Jong-shin: Singer-songwriter and host

== See also ==
- List of colleges and universities in South Korea
- Education in South Korea
