= Horace Newton Allen =

American physician (1858–1932)

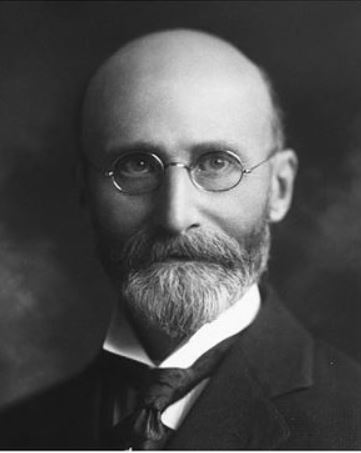

2nd United States Minister to Korea
- In office October 1, 1901 – June 9, 1905
- President: William McKinley; Theodore Roosevelt
- Preceded by: Himself (as consul-general)
- Succeeded by: Edwin Vernon Morgan

United States Consul General to Korea
- In office September 13, 1897 – October 1, 1901
- President: William McKinley
- Preceded by: John M. B. Sill
- Succeeded by: Himself (as Minister)

Personal details
- Born: April 23, 1858 Delaware, Ohio
- Died: December 11, 1932 (aged 74) Toledo, Ohio
- Party: Republican
- Spouse: Frances Ann
- Children: 2
- Education: Ohio Wesleyan University (B.S.); Miami Medical School
- Profession: Physician, diplomat

Horace Newton Allen (April 23, 1858 – December 11, 1932) was an American diplomat, missionary and physician who was American ambassador to Korea from 1897 to 1905. Along with Robert Samuel Maclay, Allen was one of the first Western Protestant missionaries in Korea, arriving there on September 15, 1884.

After treating Min Young-ik, a royal relative injured during the Gapsin Coup, Allen became close to the king of Joseon, Gojong. At his suggestion, Gojong founded the first western hospital, Chejungwon (now known as Severance Hospital). Allen was in charge of the core function of the hospital. A year after the establishment of the hospital, Allen started a medical school, which offered the first formal western medical education in Korea.

Due to Allen's relationship with the emperor and other officials, Allen became part of the United States Legation to Korea. He was appointed as secretary in 1890 and was promoted to US minister and consul general in 1897. However, Allen was recalled in 1905, over disagreements with the United States government regarding the Taft-Katsura Agreement.

== Early life and education ==
Horace Newton Allen was born in Delaware, Ohio, on April 23, 1858. He received his Bachelor of Science at Ohio Wesleyan University in 1881. He studied medicine at the Miami Medical School in Cincinnati, Ohio, graduating in 1883.

== Career ==
Allen was appointed a medical missionary and sent to China by the Board of Foreign Missions of the Northern Presbyterian Church and arrived in Shanghai on October 11, 1883. After a while, he decided to serve in Korea, which had just opened its doors to the western world. After obtaining the mission board's permission, he went to Korea on September 20, 1884, to explore. As government law prohibited foreign religion at the time, he was appointed medical officer of the United States Legation to Korea in Seoul, thus hiding his true identity. He went back to Shanghai to bring back his wife Francis "Fannie" and their son, Harry to Korea on October 26.

On December 4, 1884, the Gapsin Coup, a coup d'état staged with the help of the Japanese army by a handful of elite progressive officials, took place. The progressive government collapsed in 3 days as the Chinese army entered Seoul and defeated the Japanese army. This event started with the assassination attempt on the life of the queen's nephew, Min Young-ik, who was hosting a banquet to celebrate the opening of the nation's first postal office with dignitaries including foreign diplomats and he was inflicted with 7 severe sword wounds. Dr. Allen was summoned and treated Min's near-mortal wounds, applying western medical methods against the objection of 14 of the court's medicine men. It is noted that wounds soon became infected and Dr. Allen treated the infected wounds with "baked mud" to absorb pus and wash away with water and it took 3 months before Dr. Allen's treatment on him was completed. Upon hearing the widespread rumor that a foreigner with bushy red beard revived a dead prince, many people flocked to his house.

He submitted to the Foreign Ministry "A proposal of founding a hospital for the government of His Majesty in Seoul Corea" with an introductory letter by J. C. Foulk, chargé d'affaires of the U.S. Legation. Gojong granted his proposal readily and a western hospital named Gwanghyewon (廣惠院; lit. 'The House of Extended Grace') was opened in a traditional Korean estate on April 10, 1885. The name quickly was changed to Chejungwon (제중원; lit. 'The House of Universal Helpfulness'). The hospital had 5 separate in-patient rooms, eye treatment room for extraction of cataracts, vaccination room for smallpox, etc. A year later, Dr. Allen, John William Heron and Horace Underwood opened the Medical and Scientific School of the Royal Corean Hospital and admitted 16 medical students. The adjoining school building had a large classroom, a chemistry lab and 2 dormitory rooms.

It is noteworthy that since September 1894 the Board of Foreign Mission started to operate the nation's first western hospital and medical school in Korea and in September 1904 Chejungwon built a new ultra modern brick building outside the South Gate with help from Louis Severance, a philanthropist in Cleveland Ohio, moving patients from "the old to new buildings" on September 23. The invitation to the dedication of the building read "the New Chejungwon/Severance Hospital". For a while after the transition the popular daily newspaper Donga Ilbo called the new hospital "New Chejungwon" and government official document also referred the new hospital as Shin Chejungwon (New Chejungwon). The newly renamed Severance Hospital was the direct descendant of Chejungwon.

The Severance Hospital and Medical school on June 5, 1962, moved to a new location in Sinchon after building a huge medical complex which included the Eighth U.S. Army Memorial Chest Hospital as an integral part and a separate unit ($400,000 worth of building material and $70,000 for medical equipment as American Forces Aids to Korea Program 1955). This institution now is called Yonsei Health System, part of Yonsei University after union with Yonsei University on Jan 5, 1957.

Allen's post Chejungwon activities related to Korea are; King Gojong of Korea asked Allen to help open the Korean Legation in the United States of America and Allen led a 12-man delegation to Washington, D.C. in November 1887 and established the Korean Legation in January 1888 when Minister Park J. Y presented appointment letter to President Cleveland. Allen helped operate the Korean Legation and carried out diplomatic activities (his position was "foreign secretary" "참찬관" ).

Upon his return from North America he started working in July 1890 as Secretary at the United States Legation in Seoul and left 15 years later in June 1905 as the Envoy Extraordinaire and the Minister Plenipotential before his successor Morgan closed the United States legation in November 1905.

== Death and legacy ==
He died in Toledo, Ohio, on December 11, 1932. He was buried in Woodlawn Cemetery in Toledo. Allen and his wife, Francis Ann "Fannie", had two sons, Horace Ethan "Harry" who in turn had 3 sons and Maurice who left no children. There are 5 surviving great grandchildren.

Allen was decorated 3 times by King Gojong and the last one, the highest Tae Guk Order was donated to Yonsei Health System in 2015 by his great granddaughter Lydia Allen.

Dr. Allen's contribution to Korea: 1. Introduction of western medicine to Korea. 2. Opening the door to the proselytization of Christianity to Korea 3. Industrialization of Korea; arranging building a railroad system, trolley, electric company, etc. by American companies. 4. Faithful supporter of King Gojong and Korea.

== Awards ==
Korean Empire

- Order of the Taegeuk 1st Class

== In popular culture ==
- Portrayed by Sean Richard in the 2010 SBS TV series Jejungwon.
- Portrayed by Lorne Oliver in the 2018 tvN and Netflix TV series Mr. Sunshine.

== Bibliography ==
- Korean Tales (1889)
- A Chronological Index of the Foreign Relations of Korea from the Beginning of the Christian Era to the Twentieth Century (1901)
- Supplement (1903)
- Things Korean (Seoul, 1908)
