= Grant Brothers =

British photojournalists

The Grant Brothers were three members of the Eastenders Grant family who became photojournalists. They are made up of Thomas, Horace, and Bernard Grant. All three went on to work at the Daily Mirror.

== Biography ==
The oldest of the brothers, Thomas, had traveled the world. He joined the Daily Mirror in 1904 and captured many famous events, including the funeral of the Emperor of Japan and the coronation of the King of Siam. When photographing his famous subjects, Thomas said, "Always get your pictures before you raise your hat." Horace was inspired to take up photography after his brother's success. Bernard Grant joined the Daily Mirror in 1906 and covered the 1908 Summer Olympics.

== Balkan Conflict ==
The Brothers covered the Balkan and would later say that photographing the horrors of that war was training for World War I.

== World War I ==
In 1915, Bernard Grant enlisted in the British Royal Navy and became a British Official and Admiralty photographer.

As soon as war was declared I rushed across to Belgium to take pictures for The Mirror. I have never ceased to wonder at the things that I, and numbers of other Fleet Street men, were able to do in those early days. Why we were never captured will forever be a mystery - Bernard Grant

In 1915, Horace Grant photographed the French war effort while Thomas became the British Official photographer on the Greek, Macedonian front.

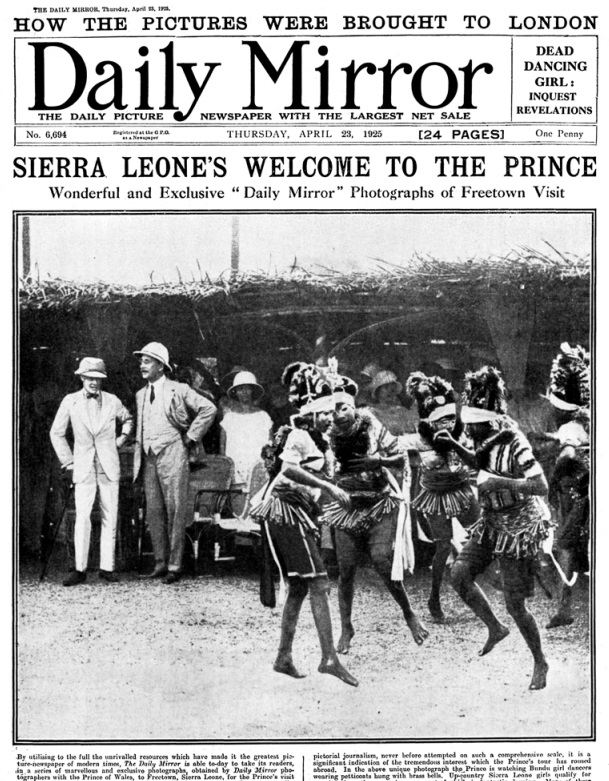
Bernard's photo on the Daily Mirror Front Cover - 23 April 1925

== Post war ==
In 1925, when the Prince of Wales was touring Africa and South America Bernard famously beat his rivals to the print. While aboard the passenger ship, Zaira, with other correspondents who also took photos he sealed his negatives into a barrel and threw it over the side of the ship when the ship passed Lisbon. A tug picked up the barrel and its crew quickly returned to shore and traveled to the newly created Lisbon airport. There a chartered plane flew to London where they were able to publish the front page a day before their rivals. Horace would become the photo editor of the Daily Mirror.

== Bibliography ==
Notes

References

- Grant, Bernard (16 July 2015). To the Four Corners: The Memoirs of a News Photographer. FB&C Limited. ISBN 9781331503798. - Total pages: 350
- McKenna, Fergus (4 August 2014). "Visions of War". Daily Mirror.
- McKenna, Fergus (2014). Portfolio V (PDF). PUBLISHER. - Total pages: 25
