= Yun Chi-wang =

Korean independence activist and physician (1895–1982)

Yun Chi-wang 윤치왕 尹致旺
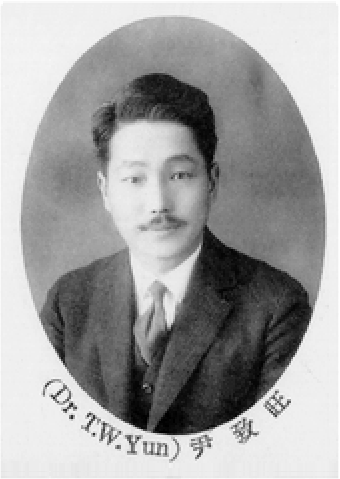
- Yun in 1929.
- Born: 17 February 1895 (Note: Sources disagree on the exact birth date. The Haepyeong Yun clan genealogy (해평윤씨대동보, 1983) gives February 17, 1895; another source gives February 10, 1895. A 2008 academic study by Park Yun-jae, based on Yun's official family register (제적등본) and his Army Headquarters officer service record (장교자력표), concludes the date was February 16, 1895.)
- Died: 21 December 1982 (aged 87)

- Yun Chi-wang
- Hangul: 윤치왕
- Hanja: 尹致旺
- RR: Yun Chiwang
- MR: Yun Ch'iwang

Art name
- Hangul: 남포
- Hanja: 南圃
- RR: Nampo
- MR: Namp'o

Courtesy name
- Hangul: 성운
- Hanja: 聖雲
- RR: Seongun
- MR: Sŏngun

General Yun Chi-wang (Korean: 윤치왕; Hanja: 尹致旺; February 16, 1895 – December 21, 1982) was a South Korean politician, soldier and gynecologist. He was the half brother of Yun Chi-ho, uncle of Yun Posun (who was the fourth president of South Korea), and cousin of Yun Chi-young. His art name was Namppo (남포; 南圃), and his courtesy name was Seongun (성운; 聖雲).

== Biography ==
Yun Chi-wang's father was Yun Ung-nyeol (1840–1911); his mother was Kim Jung-soon (1876–1959), his father's concubine. He had a half-brother Yun Chi-ho (1865–1945), some thirty years his elder, whose mother was their father's wife, Lee Jung-Mu (1844–1936).

In 1911, he entered Suwan Agricultural High School, but in 1912 he dropped out, and in 1913 went to participate in independent activities in China. In 1914, on Kim Kyu-sik's advice, he went to study at the University of Glasgow.

From 1927 to 1944 he worked at Severance Hospital in his homeland, and in 1938 became its second Director. He was also Chairman of Korea's Maternity Society.

In 1948 he enlisted in the South Korean Army as a medical officer with the rank of lieutenant colonel. In 1950, he participated in the Korean War. In March 1959 he retired with the rank of lieutenant general, and took full retirement in 1960.

== Books ==
- Dysmenorrhea
- Health of Nation and Peoples

== See also ==
- Yun Chi-ho
- Yun Ung-nyeol
- Yun Bo-seon
