= 10 Magazine (South Korean magazine) =

Monthly English-language magazine

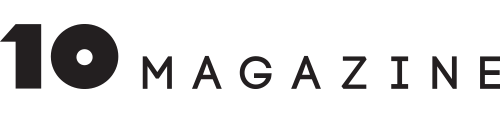
- 10 Magazine logo
- Editor: Stephen Revere
- Frequency: Monthly
- Circulation: 20,000
- Publisher: Sang-tae Kim
- First issue: October, 2008
- Country: South Korea
- Based in: Seoul
- Language: English
- Website: 10mag.com

Founded in October 2008, 10 Magazine is an English language, "events-led" monthly magazine published in Seoul, South Korea. The content focuses on the month's events (concerts, exhibitions, festivals, etc.) around the country and entertaining activities to experience while visiting or residing in Korea.

== Contents ==
The first half of each issue is dedicated to a variety of entertainment opportunities in South Korea. Articles include Expat Expertise, In the Kitchen (chef profiles), 10 Questions (interviews), Korean Destinations, Asian Destinations (travel to nearby Asian countries), Korean History, Blog of the Month, Family & Community.

Each month there are also in-depth cover stories, often focused on top 10 lists. Some topics have included the 10 most exclusive places in Korea, the 10 best burgers, wings and pizza, traditional Korean markets, expatriate owner-chefs, the best hiking locations, dating in Korea and more.

The second half of each issue is devoted to their nationwide "Calendar and Directory" section. It divides the nation into 7 different regions; Nationwide (전국), Seoul (서울), Gyeonggi (경기), Chungcheong (충청), Gyeongsang (경상), Gangwon (강원), Jeolla (전라) and Jeju (제주). Each section provides event information for each region in the Calendar and business services of interest to English speakers in the Directory section. Each regional Calendar lists events according to the following categories: Art, Theater & Dance, Concerts, Film, Family & Community, Education & Conferences, Sport & Fitness, Dine & Drink and Nightlife.

== History ==
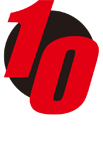
10 Magazine's previous logo

The parent company of 10 Magazine, 10 Media, was founded in the summer of 2008 by Sang-tae Kim, Jai-yoon Kim, Kyoung-hee Lim, Hyeong-beom Lee, and Stephen Revere. In September of that year, they released a pre-launch issue, and October saw the official launch issue. The launch issue was released with congratulatory messages from many dignitaries and celebrities including:

- the President and CEO of the American Chamber of Commerce,
- the Secretary General of the European Chamber of Commerce,
- the Italian Ambassador to Korea
- Korean celebrity Ahn Jae-wook
- Model and entertainer Kim Ha-neul
- Busan mayor Hur Nam-sik.
- K-pop girl group Girls' Generation (소녀시대)

After starting out in the Nonhyeon-dong offices of CEO Kim Sang-tae, the 10 Magazine offices have moved twice. They are now located in Suite 1010 of the Hannam Building (211 Itaewon-ro, Yongsan-gu, Seoul, Korea).

As of March 28, 2012, 10 Magazine went on sale in the App Store (iOS) and is now available worldwide through the 10 Magazine app. The app is also available in the Google Play store.

In October 2012, the magazine replaced their original logo with the current one.

== Contests ==
10 Magazine is associated with several annual contests, including its Korea Awaits Video Contest, held annually. In 2010 the contest winner was Michael Aronson, who won a three-day trip to Tokyo, Japan, including round-trip tickets on Delta Air Lines and two nights' hotel stay at the Tokyo Hilton, while the 2011 winner, Fabien Tran Minh, won two round-trip tickets to Europe on Lufthansa.

== Events ==
10 Magazine also co-sponsors the Foreigner's Day events with FC Seoul, which bring together Seoul's international community to cheer on Seoul's football team. The first took place on September 11, 2010, with an estimated 3,000 non-Koreans in attendance and the second took place on September 24, 2011, and had approximately 7,000 non-Korean attendees.

== Associated Publications ==
The Weekly 10 is their weekly email service listing what their editors determine to be the best 10 events of the week. It is sent out every Thursday at 12noon.

The 10 Magazine Korean Culture Podcast is a bi-weekly podcast which looks at current issues in Korea, tourist information, upcoming events and Korean culture itself. The hosts are Charles Montgomery, Paul Matthews and Danielle Sedlak.

The Chip's Maps are a small, pocket-sized publication produced by 10 Media which provides a map of the central Yongsan-gu area, including Itaewon, Gyeongridan, and Haebangchon. It is advertiser supported, printed in both Korean and English and provides information on local businesses in the area.

KodexX is a new website created by 10 Magazine in March, 2016 as a way to show English speakers where they can find everything they need. Anyone can add any business or place they think people would want to find, as long as someone who speaks English would be able too understand the content.
