= Park Ji-won (businessman) =

South Korean businessman (born 1977)

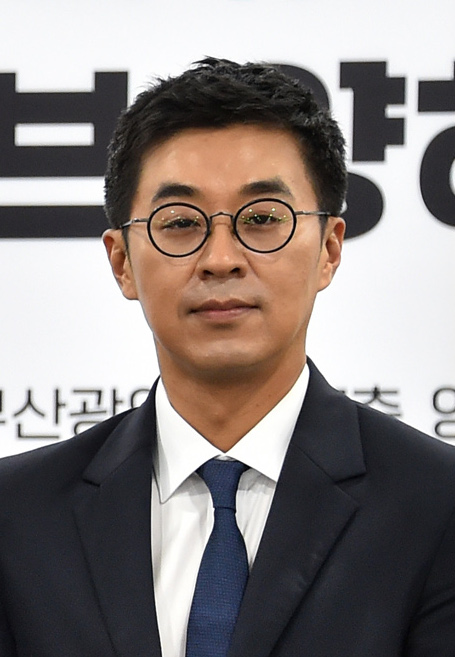
- Former CEO of HYBE
- Born: June 30, 1977 (age 49); South Korea
- Education: Yonsei University
- Occupation: Business executive
- Known for: Former CEO of HYBE

Korean name
- Hangul: 박지원
- RR: Bak Jiwon
- MR: Pak Chiwŏn

Park Ji-won (Korean: 박지원; born June 30, 1977) is a South Korean business executive. He was chief executive officer of the company HYBE from 2021 until 2024.

== Early life and education ==
He was born on June 30, 1977. He obtained his bachelor's degree in Political Science and International Relations as well as his master's degree in political science from Yonsei University.

== Career ==
=== Nexon ===
Park joined the online video game company Nexon in 2003. After working at Nexon Japan, where he was chief of management planning and operations roles, he returned to global business management at Nexon Korea. Park was CEO at Nexon Korea from 2014 and Global COO from then onward. He left the company around 2019.

=== HYBE ===
In May 2020, Park became Big Hit's CEO in charge of home business operations at the company headquarters and was renamed CEO of the HYBE headquarters a year after.

By then, in July 2021, Park was installed as CEO of HYBE, replacing founder Bang Si-hyuk who stayed on as chairman of the board. Under Park, the company's multi-label model, global activities, and management vision were spearheaded. As revenue increased, total income roughly doubled during his stay.

Park was part of the Variety500 list of entertainment business leaders.

=== Resignation ===
On July 24, 2024, Park stepped down as chief executive of HYBE. He cited in an internal message that new management was necessary to continue implementing the company's "HYBE 2.0 strategy". Jason Jaesang Lee (Lee Jae-sang), the former chief strategy officer, became the CEO.

HYBE explained then that Park would continue to work on areas related to the convergence of entertainment and technology. Reports later in March 2025 stated that Park had departed from the company.

In 2026, Park took it to social media on a court ruling based on a past feud with the former ADOR CEO, Min Hee-jin, to clarify some of the said remarks attributed to him were taken out of context.
