= Horace Grant Underwood =

American missionary in Korea (1859–1916)

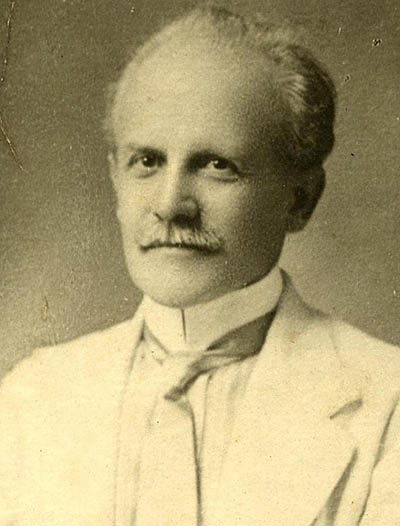
- Underwood in 1888
- Born: July 19, 1859; London, United Kingdom
- Died: October 12, 1916 (aged 57); Atlantic City, New Jersey, United States
- Resting place: Yanghwajin Foreign Missionary Cemetery, South Korea (1999–); Grove Church Cemetery, United States (1916–1999)
- Known for: Early missionary in Korea, founding school that became Yonsei University
- Notable work: The Call of Korea

Korean name
- Hangul: 원두우
- Hanja: 元杜尤
- RR: Won Duu
- MR: Wŏn Tuu

Horace Grant Underwood (19 July 1859 – 12 October 1916) was an American Presbyterian missionary, educator, and translator who dedicated his life to developing Christianity in Korea.

== Early life ==
Underwood was born in London, England, United Kingdom and immigrated to the United States at age 12. He graduated from New York University in 1881 and New Brunswick Theological Seminary in 1884.

== Work in Korea ==
It is said that Underwood was moved by a letter from Lee Soo-jung (the first translator of the Bible into Korean) published in an American Bible Society publication, which inspired him to commit to missionary work in Korea. Underwood served as a Northern Presbyterian Church missionary in Korea, teaching physics and chemistry at Gwanghyewon in Seoul, the first modern hospital of Korea. Underwood arrived in Korea on the same boat as Henry G. Appenzeller on Easter Sunday (5 April) 1885, and he also worked with Henry Appenzeller, William B. Scranton, James Scarth Gale, and William D. Reynolds to translate the Bible into Korean. The New Testament was completed in 1900 and the Old Testament in 1910. Underwood also worked with Horace N. Allen, an American missionary doctor attached to the royal court. In 1900, Underwood and James Scarth Gale established the Seoul YMCA, and in 1912 Underwood became the president of the Pyeongtaek University established by Arthur Tappan Pierson (평택대학교, 구 피어선기념성경학교). The same year Underwood became the president of the Joseon Christian College (경신학교; 儆新學校), the predecessor of Yonsei University. Underwood wrote several books on Korea, including The Call of Korea.

== Death ==
In 1916, Underwood returned to the US due to failing health, but he died shortly thereafter in Atlantic City. He was originally buried at Grove Church Cemetery in North Bergen, New Jersey, but in 1999 his remains were reinterred in the Yanghwajin Foreigners' Cemetery in Seoul, South Korea.

== Personal life ==
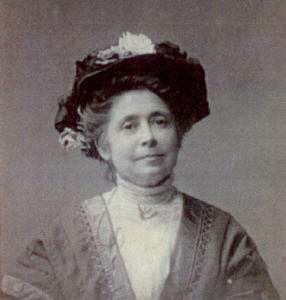
Lillias Horton Underwood

Underwood's older brother, John T. Underwood, a typewriter entrepreneur based in New York, helped finance Horace Grant's missionary endeavours. In 1889, Underwood married Lillias Horton (1851–1921), a doctor.

== Underwood family legacy ==
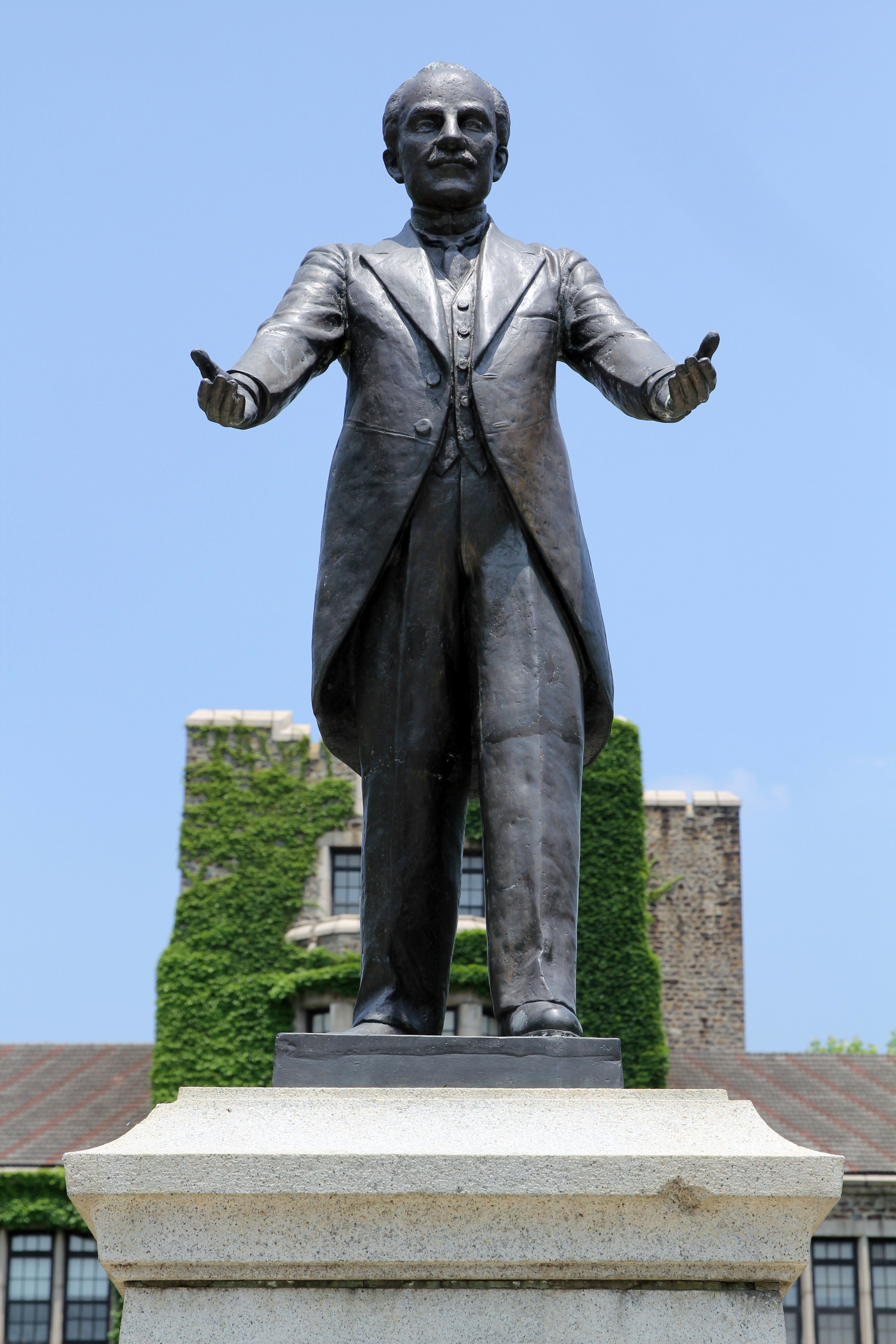
Statue at Yonsei University

Underwood's legacy is visible at various Christian educational institutes in Seoul. There is a statue of Underwood in the centre of the Yonsei University campus, and the Underwood Activity Centre of Seoul Foreign School is dedicated to his grandson, Richard F. Underwood. Underwood's descendants continued to develop Korean society, religion, politics and education for over one hundred years.

His son, Horace Horton Underwood (1890–1951) continued the tradition of education and worked at Yonhi University, another predecessor of Yonsei University.

His grandson, Horace Grant Underwood II (1917–2004) who, among other notable achievements, served as an interpreter in the Korean War armistice talks.

His great-grandson, Horace Horton Underwood II (1942– ), served as a professor of English literature at Yonsei University.

The Underwood family is no longer involved with mission work but continues to serve in Korea at the US Embassy in Korea and in business.

The New Brunswick Theological Seminary has an endowed chair in honour of Underwood for a professor specialising in Global Christianity and missions.

== See also ==
- Christianity in South Korea
- Yonsei University
