= Louis Severance =

American oilman, philanthropist and sulfur magnate

Louis Henry Severance
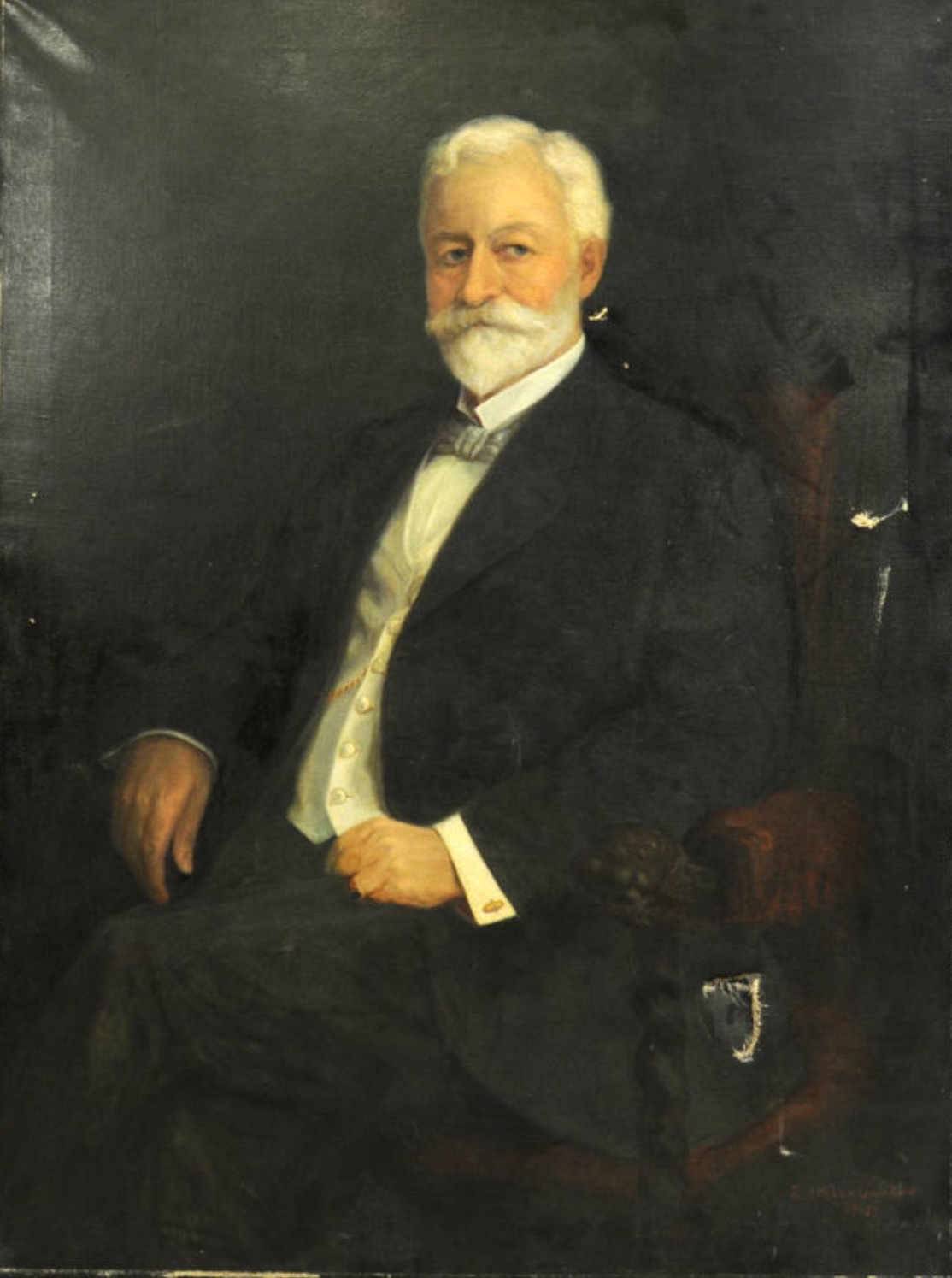
- Born: August 1, 1838; Cleveland, Ohio, U.S.
- Died: June 25, 1913 (aged 74); Cleveland, Ohio, U.S.
- Occupations: Treasurer of Standard Oil Company; investor; philanthropist
- Employer(s): Standard Oil Company, Commercial National Bank
- Movement: Anti-Slavery
- Spouses: Fannie Buckingham Benedict (m. 1862; died 1874) Florence Severance (m. 1894; died 1895)
- Children: John, Elisabeth, Anne Belle, Fanny
- Parent(s): Solomon Severance; Mary Long Severance

Louis Henry Severance (August 1, 1838 – June 25, 1913) was an American oilman and philanthropist who was a founding member of the Standard Oil Trust, the first treasurer of Standard Oil, and a sulfur magnate.

== Early life ==
Severance was born in Cleveland on August 1, 1838. He was the second son of Mary Helen (née Long) Severance (1816–1902) and Solomon Lewis Severance (1812–1838), who died in July 1838, a month before his birth. He and his older brother Solon were raised by his widowed mother, in the Cleveland home of their maternal grandparents, Juliana (née Walworth) Long and Dr. David Long, who was Cleveland's first physician.

Severance picked up his mother's commitment to the Presbyterian mission and the anti-slavery cause. His father had been one of Cleveland's dry goods merchants who went into partnership as Cutter & Severance. Solomon was also the secretary of the Cleveland Anti-Slavery Society, and treasurer of the Cuyahoga County Anti-Slavery society.

He attended public schools in Cleveland before entering the workforce at age eighteen.

== Career ==
In 1856, Severance joined the Commercial National Bank. In 1863, Severance became a 100-day Union army volunteer, in the defense of Washington D.C. during the U.S. Civil War.

His bank lent to John D. Rockefeller's oil business, and, in 1864, Severance started an oil exploration, and refinery business himself, in the oil boom town of Titusville, Pennsylvania. In 1872, after the stillborn birth of his fourth child, he returned to Cleveland, where the children's uncle, Solon, raised them with his own three children. Severance later supported his nephew, Allen; funding his lifelong study of theology.

By 1876, Rockefeller's Standard Oil had a near industry monopoly and Severance joined as the Ohio company's treasurer. While at Standard, he founded another company, mining sulfur, and because it held the patent on the Frasch process it too monopolized a profitable industry.

=== Later life ===
In 1894, by then a very wealthy man, Severance retired from active management of business. In his retirement, he was a leading sponsor of Ohio education, the YMCA, and overseas Presbyterian missions. He was a church elder and in 1904 the vice moderator of its General Assembly; he paid for chapels in Cleveland, as well as missions, colleges, and hospitals in Asia.

Severance Hospital in Seoul is named in his honor. He donated $50,000 to $100,000 annually directly to the church. His son-in-law wrote "While his philanthropies were very broad and he responded to appeals of every sort, he seems to have been dominated by one fundamental idea,—the building up of the Christian church."

== Personal life ==
The year after he joined the Commercial National Bank, a friend from his church introduced Severance to the Norwalk belle Fannie Buckingham Benedict (1839–1874). They married in 1862 and together, Fannie and Louis were the parents of:

- John Long Severance (1863–1936), who became a businessman, and an important patron of the arts in Ohio. He married Elisabeth Huntington DeWitt (1865–1929) in 1891.
- Elisabeth Severance (1865–1944), a philanthropist who established the public health charitable foundation in her name.
- Anne Belle Severance (1868–1896), (Note: The children's birth names are recorded in A history of Cleveland and its environs; the heart of new Connecticut, but, by 1881, Severance's youngest daughter was registered both as "Anne Belle" and "Annie Belle" in the Oberlin College calendar (p. 78), and appears as Annie B. Severance in the 1880 Cleveland census. Her life is recorded in the book In memoriam: Annie Belle Severance (1896).) who died on the Isle of Wight, aged 28.
- Fanny Severance (1872–1872), who was stillborn.

His wife Fannie died in 1874. In 1894, he married the equally rich Florence Severance (1857–1895), the only surviving daughter of Standard Oil millionaires Stephen and his second wife, Anna Harkness. Florence died within a year of the marriage and her considerable estate increased his fortune further.

On June 25, 1913, Severance died suddenly, in his daughter Elisabeth's home, in the care of his son in law, Dr Dudley P. Allen, after being taken suddenly ill. As he died intestate, his estate was divided between his two surviving children.

== Legacy ==
- L.H. Severance Scholarship: annual undergraduate academic scholarship at Lincoln University, Pennsylvania
- L.H. Severance Gymnasium (1912): at the College of Wooster. —He largely funded the rebuilding of the entire university after it burned down in 1901, including a new Severance Library. He had sufficient influence to have Wooster fraternities and sororities banned in 1912 (on the grounds that they were un-Christian).
- Severance Hospital, Seoul (opened in 1904 as the first Western-style hospital building in Korea after a large 1900 donation from Severance to support the missionary care there).
- The Severance Chemical Laboratory (1901), at Oberlin College.
- Severance Hall is named for John L. Severance and his wife Elisabeth.
