= Severance Hospital =

- Yonsei University Health System
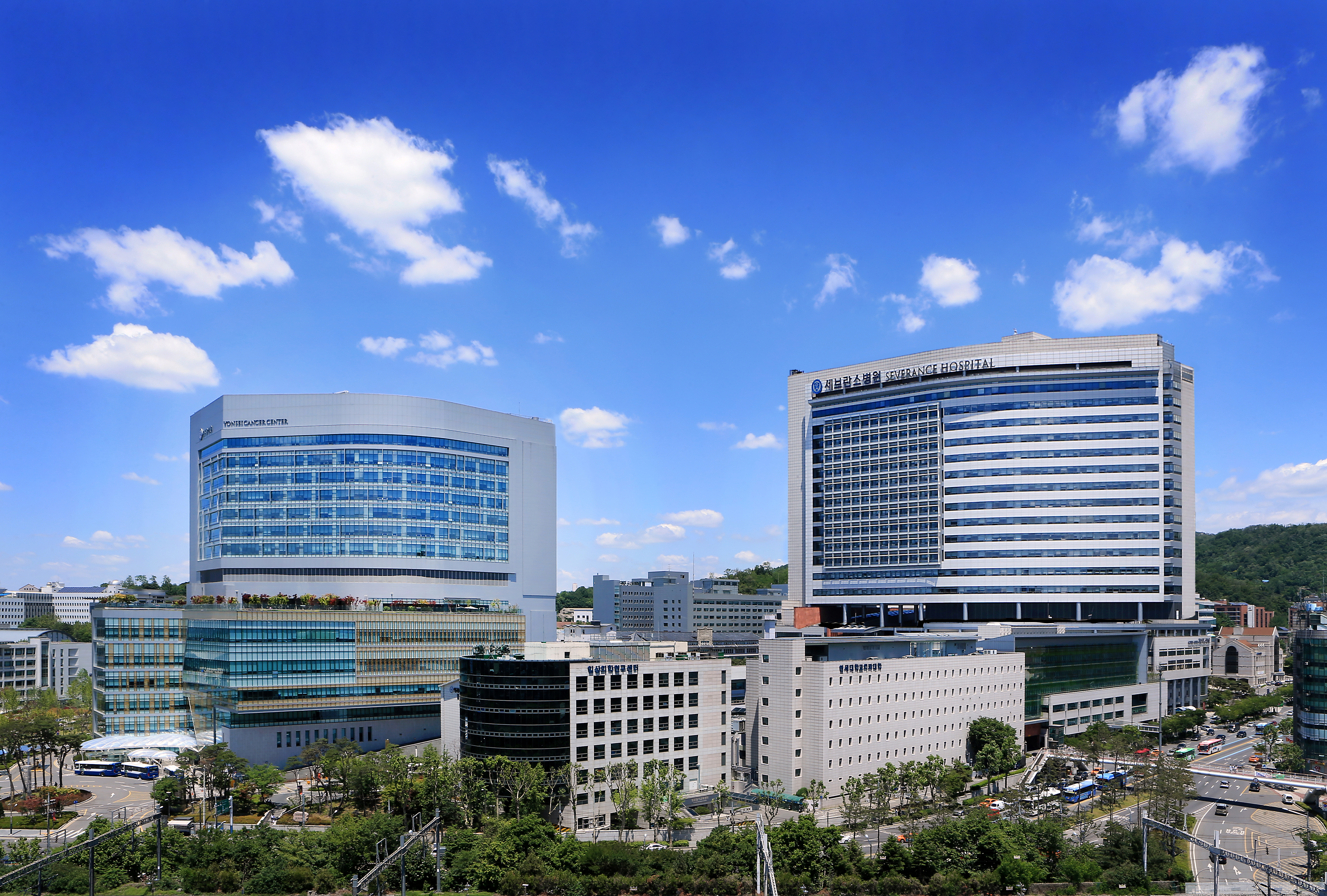
- Severance Hospital

Geography
- Location: Seodaemun-gu, Seoul, South Korea
- Coordinates: 37.5624°N 126.9409°E

Organisation
- Type: Teaching
- Affiliated university: Yonsei University

Services
- Emergency department: Yes

History
- Founded: 1885

Links
- Website: yuhs.or.kr
- Lists: Hospitals in South Korea
- Other links: sev.isevrance.com

- Severance Hospital
- Hangul: 세브란스 병원
- Hanja: 세브란스 病院
- RR: Sebeuranseu byeongwon
- MR: Sebŭransŭ pyŏngwŏn

Yonsei University Medical School
- Hangul: 연세대학교 의료원
- Hanja: 延世大學校醫療院
- RR: Yeonse daehakgyo uiryowon
- MR: Yŏnse taehakkyo ŭiryowŏn

Severance Hospital is a teaching hospital located in Sinchon-dong, Seodaemun District,Seoul, South Korea. It is one of the oldest and biggest university hospitals in South Korea. It has 2,437 beds and treats approximately 2,500,000 outpatients and 840,000 inpatients annually.

The hospital was founded as a royal hospital in 1885 by Horace N. Allen which was then restructured as Severance Hospital by Oliver R. Avison, a Canadian Christian medical missionary with the advisory of Underwood, his role model and financial assistance from Louis H. Severance. On September 23, 1904, Avison's hospital, Severance Hospital and College, first opened its doors. Since 1957 it has been affiliated with Yonsei University College of Medicine, and is part of the Yonsei University Health System.

== History ==
This is the oldest Western-style hospital in the country, founded in 1885 as a royal hospital named "Gwanghyewon" (Korean: 광혜원; Hanja: 廣惠院) by Horace N. Allen, an American doctor and medical missionary. Both Presbyterian and Methodist medical and educational missionaries from the United States were active in Korea for decades.

This was renamed Severance Hospital on 3 September 1904 after a generous American donor, Louis Severance, of Standard Oil. In the same year, the hospital added Severance Hospital Medical School and the attached School of Nursing was founded by Esther Lucas Shields in 1906. After 1910, when Japan took over rule of Korea, it added new requirements for hospitals and staff which the missionaries, in some cases, struggled to meet. In 1954, Florence J. Murray, a Canadian medical missionary became superintendent of Severance. Under her leadership, surgical services expanded and the hospital merged with Chosun Christian Hospital to form Yonsei University. Murray would later lead Wonju United Christian Hospital which she would merge with Yonsei to form the Yonsei University Wonju Campus.

In 1947, after the end of World War II and Japanese rule of Korea, the medical school was upgraded to "Severance Medical College". On 5 January 1957, the Severance Medical College was united with Yonhee University under the name of "Yonsei University".

=== Severance Hospital divisions ===
- Severance Hospital (Sinchon)
- Gangnam Severance Hospital
- Yongin Severance Hospital
- Songdo Severance Hospital (under construction)
- Wonju Severance Christian Hospital

== See also ==
- Louis Severance
