= Politics of Joseon =

1392–1897 Koreanic state politics

The politics of the Joseon dynasty, which ruled Korea from 1392 to 1897, were governed by the reigning ideology of Korean Confucianism, a form of Neo-Confucianism. Political struggles were common between different factions of the scholar-officials. Purges frequently resulted in leading political figures being sent into exile or condemned to death.

The political system of this period was dominated by a Confucianist bureaucracy. The government officials were ranked in 18 levels, ranging from senior first rank (jeong-il-pum, Korean: 정1품; Hanja: 正一品) down to junior ninth rank (jong-gu-pum, Korean: 종9품; Hanja: 從九品) based on seniority and promotion, which was achieved through the royal decree based on examinations and recommendations.

The power of the bureaucrats often eclipsed that of the central authorities, including the monarch. For much of the dynasty, a complex system of checks and balances prevented any one section of the government from gaining overwhelming power until the 19th century when political power became concentrated in a certain family or individual.

== Government ==
=== The king ===
The king ruled for life, unlike any of his appointees. The kings of Joseon were all of the Jeonju Yi clan and descended from Taejo. For a list of Joseon kings, see List of Korean monarchs. Under Confucian philosophy, the king commanded absolute loyalty from his officials and subjects, but the officials were also expected to try to guide the king to the right path if the latter was mistaken. Natural disasters were thought to be due to the king's failings, and therefore, Joseon kings were very sensitive to their occurrences.

=== Civil service ===
In order to serve in the positions of responsibility outside the military in Joseon period, one had to take a series of gwageo literary examinations and pass each of them (usually four to five times). Theoretically, any male other than cheonmin (lowest class) and children of concubines could take gwageo examinations to enter a civil service and thus become yangban (nobility class). In actuality, only the yangban class had the luxury of time and money as well as the necessary connections to pass gwageo exams. In addition, people from the troublesome northern provinces of Hamgyeong and Pyeongan were barred from office for much of the dynasty.

Officials served in positions for fixed terms, varying from one year to five years. A successful official might serve in tens of positions in the course of a career.

=== State council ===
State Council (Uijeongbu, Korean: 의정부; Hanja: 議政府) was the highest deliberative body of the Joseon dynasty although it faded in importance after first centuries of rule. It was composed of twelve officials. The Chief State Councillor (Yeonguijeong, 영의정, 領議政), Left State Councillor (Jwauijeong, 좌의정), and Right State Councillor (Uuijeong, 우의정) were the highest-ranking officials in the government (senior first rank). They were assisted by Left Minister (Jwachanseong, 좌찬성) and Right Minister (Uichangseong, 우찬성), both of junior first rank, and seven lower ranking officials. The power of State Council was inversely proportional to the king's power. Sometimes it directly controlled Six Ministries, the chief executive body of Joseon government, but primarily served in advisory role under stronger kings. State councillors served in several other positions including a tutor to the crown prince.

=== Six Ministries ===
The Six Ministries (Yukjo, Korean: 육조; Hanja: 六曹) were the chief executive body of Joseon. Each Minister (Panseo, 판서) was of senior second rank (2a, third highest rank) and was assisted by a Deputy-Minister (Champan, 참판) of junior second rank (2b, fourth highest rank) and a Secretary (Chamui, 참의) of rank 3a. Apart from these three Dangsanggwan (당상관, 堂上官) officials, each Ministry was headed by three section chiefs or Jeongrang (정랑, rank 5a) and three assistant section chiefs or Jwarang (좌랑, rank 6a), adding to nine officials ranked 6a or above.

- Ministry of Personnel (Ijo, 이조, 吏曹) – was primarily concerned with appointment of officials
- Ministry of Taxation (Hojo, 호조, 戶曹) – taxation, finances, census, agriculture, and land policies
- Ministry of Rites (Yejo, 예조, 禮曹) – rituals, culture, diplomacy, gwageo
- Ministry of War (Byeongjo, 병조, 兵曹) – military affairs
- Ministry of Justice (Hyeongjo, 형조, 刑曹) – administration of law, slavery, punishments
- Ministry of Works (Gongjo, 공조, 工曹) – industry, public works, manufacturing, mining

=== Three Offices ===
Three Offices (Samsa, Korean: 삼사; Hanja: 三司) is a collective name for three offices that provided checks and balance on the king and the officials. The officials who served in these offices tended to be younger and of lower rank compared to other offices but enjoyed special privileges and prestige. They went through more thorough review of moral character and family background.

- Office of the Inspector-General (Saheonbu, 사헌부, 司憲府) - It monitored government administration and officials in both central and local governments for corruption or incompetence. It was run by 30 officials including Inspector General (Daesaheon, 대사헌), a position of junior second rank.
- Office of the Censor-General (Saganwon, 사간원, 司諫院) - Its chief function was to remonstrate with the king if there was wrong or improper action or policy. It also impeached corrupt officials and spoke opinions about the general state of affairs. It was composed of five officials, led by Chief Censor (Daesagan, 대사간), of senior third rank. Its function as organ of speech often overlapped with Office of Inspector General, and they sometimes submitted joint petition to the king.
- Office of Special Advisors (Hongmoongwan, 홍문관, 弘文館) - It oversaw the royal library and served as research institute to study Confucian philosophy and answer the king's questions. It was composed of 21 officials, but its three highest officials were ministers serving in State Council and the actual head of the office was Deputy Chief Scholar (Bujehak, 부제학), a position of senior third rank. Its officials took part in the daily lessons called kyeongyeon(경연), in which they discussed Confucian philosophy with the king. These discussions often led to comments on current political issues, and these officials had significant influence as advisors. (It was established to replace Hall of Worthies (Jiphyeonjeon, 집현전, 集賢殿) after the latter was abolished by King Sejo in the aftermath of Six martyred ministers.)

The Samsa provided a key check on the powers of the other branches of government. The Inspector-General and Censor-General had the unique power to vet potential appointees for all positions, and examine their family backgrounds. They thus played a role in maintaining the integrity of the yangban aristocracy.

=== Other Offices ===
- Royal Secretariat (Seungjeongwon, 승정원, 承政院) - It served as a liaison between the king and Six Ministries. There were six royal secretaries, one for each ministry, of senior third rank. Their primary role was to pass down royal decree to the ministries and submit petitions to the king, but they also advised the king and served in other key positions close to the king.
- Capital Bureau (Hanseongbu, 한성부, 漢城府) - It was in charge of running the capital, Hanyang (present-day Seoul). It was composed of nine officials, led by a panyun (판윤, 判尹), of senior second rank and equivalent to today's mayor of Seoul.
- Royal Investigation Bureau (Uigeumbu, 의금부, 義禁府) - It was an investigative and enforcement office under direct control of the king. It chiefly dealt with treason and other serious cases that concerned the king and served to arrest, investigate, imprison, and carry out sentences against the suspected offenders, who were often government officials.
- Office of Records (Chunchugwan, 춘추관, 春秋館) - Its officials wrote, compiled, and maintained the government and historical records.
- Seonggyungwan or Royal Academy (성균관, 成均館) - Royal university served to prepare the future government officials. Those who passed first two stages of gwageo examinations were admitted to Seonggyungwan. The class size was usually 200 students, who lived in the residential hall and followed strict routine and school rules. It also served as the state shrine for Chinese and Korean Confucian scholars. The official in charge was a daesaseong (대사성, 大司成), of senior third rank, and 36 other officials including those from other offices were involved in running the academy.

== Local government ==
The ranked officials were sent from the central government. Sometimes a secret royal inspector (Amhaeng-eosa, 암행어사) was sent to travel incognito and monitor the provincial officials. Secret inspectors were generally young officials of lower rank but invested with royal authority to dismiss corrupt officials.

- Provinces: do (도) – There were eight provinces, each of them governed by a Governor (Gwanchalsa, 관찰사), a position of junior second rank.
- Prefectures: bu (부) – administrative offices in charge of five major cities in provinces. Each bu was led by a buyun (부윤), which was equivalent to governor in rank.
- Departments: mok (목) – There were twenty mok, which governed large counties called ju (주). They were governed by moksa (목사), of senior third rank.
- Counties: gun (군) – There were eighty counties in Joseon, each governed by gunsu (군수), of junior fourth rank.
- Settlements or communities: hyeon (현) – Large hyeon were governed by hyeollyeong (현령) of junior fifth rank while smaller hyeon were governed by hyeongam (현감) of junior sixth rank.

Each county and hyeon was overseen by a local magistrate appointed by the central government. The yangban of each county (gun) composed a Local Office. This interacted with local officials, typically of a lower class, who were known as hyangni. The hyangni typically served for life in hereditary posts. The hyangni of each county had an ambassador in the capital who was charged with communicating among them and the central government.

== Factions ==
Throughout the dynasty, various regional and ideological factions struggled for dominance in the political system. In the earliest years of Joseon, tension between the capital faction and the Yeongnam-based Sarim faction dominated national politics. The different Seowon across the country, which combined the functions of Confucian shrines with educational institutions, often reflected the factional alignment of the local elite. In the 16th century, a nationwide split occurred between the Easterners (Dongin) and Westerners (Seoin), and within decades the Easterners eventually split into the Northerners (Bukin) and the more moderate Southerners (Namin) In the seventeenth century, the Westerners too divided into the Patriarchs (Noron) and the Disciples (Soron).

Under the reigns of Yeongjo and Jeongjo in the 18th century, the kings generally pursued the tangpyeongchaek, a policy of balance favoring no faction over another. In Jeongjo's reign, strife emerged between the Intransigents (Byeokpa) and the Expedients (Shipa), two groups which cut across the earlier factions and differed in their attitudes concerning certain royal policies; the Intransigents were more opposed to the king and largely composed of Patriarchs. In the 19th century, Joseon politics shifted as in-law families (called cheokga) rather than scholarly factions came to dominate the throne. For most of the 19th century, the Jangdong branch of the Andong Kim clan was in control of the government; however, there was a brief interlude in which control shifted to the Pungyang Cho clan.

During the reign of Gojong, real power initially belonged to his father the Heungseon Daewongun, who on one hand sought to reform corrupt state institutions but on the other hand pursued a policy of isolationism, opposing the opening of the country to Western and Japanese influences. From the 1870s onwards, Queen Min (known posthumously as Empress Myeongseong) became more dominant and pursued a policy of cautious modernisation and opening up. Her dominance was opposed by reactionaries and progressives alike. The Enlightenment Party (also known as Progressives) sought to modernise the country along Western and Japanese lines. Even amongst the modernisers factions emerged, with one faction favouring the Russian Empire and a second favouring the Japanese Empire, initially the influence of the Russians was strongest but waned with their defeat to Japan in the Russo-Japanese War. These factional struggles led to the Imo Incident and Gapsin Coup, as well as increased foreign interference in Korean affairs.

=== Purges ===
Purges in Joseon dynasty were often violent, leading to the execution and internal exile of many members of the losing side. In some cases, even the graves of their ancestors were desecrated. Purges were especially widespread during Sukjong's reign, when there was change of faction in power four times, each time accompanied by cycle of revenge for earlier wrongdoings.

== Rebellions ==
The most famous rebellions took place in the 19th century, as the social system of Joseon was beginning to collapse: the rebellion of Hong Gyeong-nae in the northern provinces in 1811, the Imo Incident of 1882, and the Donghak uprising of 1894–1895.

Occasional rebellions also took place among the country's small ethnic minorities. The Tungusic tribes of the northeast rose in 1583 under Nitanggae and seized a number of towns; they were put down by the general Sin Rip. Thereafter markets were established in the region to help supply the tribesmen with needed goods. In 1510, Japanese merchants and settlers had risen in rebellion against a local commander; this was followed by the expulsion of all Japanese and the closure of the ports for two years. After the Seven Year War, Japanese access to the country was sharply constrained, and such incidents ceased to occur.

== Diplomacy ==
Joseon's international relations implemented Korean Neo-Confucian ideal of "serving the great" (sadae) to Chinese Ming dynasty and later Manchu Qing dynasty.

On a lower level, the country maintained ties with various neighboring nations, including the Jurchen tribes of the north and the Japanese and Ryūkyū states across the sea. To this end, interpreting schools were set up in the capital and in border towns such as Jeju and Busan.

The Joseon dynasty endured two major invasions prior to its progressive loss of sovereignty in the late 19th century. These were the Seven-Year War, a two-stage Japanese invasion led by Toyotomi Hideyoshi in the 1590s, and the First and Second Manchu invasions in the early 17th century. Although the Japanese were ultimately repelled, Joseon was compelled to surrender to the Manchus, who later became the Qing dynasty.

After the Treaty of Ganghwa and the opening of the ports in 1876, the diplomatic approach changed, and the government of Joseon began to enter into diplomatic relations with both neighboring and European countries.

=== Treaties of Joseon dynasty ===
==== Before 1875 ====
Treaty		Year	Signatory country/power
English name	Korean name	Year	Signatory country/power
Treaty of Gyehae	계해조약(癸亥條約)	1443	Tsushima (Japan)
Treaty of Imsin	임신조약 (壬申條約)	1512	Tsushima (Japan)
Treaty of Jeongmi	정미약조 (丁未約條)	1547	Tsushima (Japan)
Treaty of Giyu	기유약조 (己酉約條)	1609	Tokugawa shogunate (Japan)
Treaty of Jeongmyo	정묘조약(丁卯條約)	1627	Later Jin (Manchu)
Treaty of Jeongchuk	정축조약(丁丑條約)	1637	Qing (Manchu)

==== After 1875 ====
Treaty		Year	Signatory country
English name	Korean name	Year	Signatory country
Japan–Korea Treaty of 1876* (Treaty of Ganghwa)	강화도 조약(江華島條約)	1876	Japan
Joseon–United States Treaty of 1882*	조미수호통상조약(朝美修好通商條約)	1882	United States
Japan–Korea Treaty of 1882* (Treaty of Chemulpo)	제물포 조약(濟物浦條約)	1882	Japan
China–Korea Treaty of 1882* (Joseon–Qing Communication and Commerce Rules)	조청상민수륙무역장정(朝淸商民水陸貿易章程)	1882	Qing (China)
Germany–Korea Treaty of 1883*	조독수호통상조약(朝獨修好通商條約)	1883	Germany
United Kingdom–Korea Treaty of 1883*	조영수호통상조약(朝英修好通商條約)	1883	United Kingdom
Russia–Korea Treaty of 1884*	조로수호통상조약(朝露修好通商條約)	1884	Russia
Italy–Korea Treaty of 1884*	조이수호통상조약(朝伊修好通商條約)	1884	Italy
Japan–Korea Treaty of 1885* (Treaty of Hanseong)	한성조약(漢城條約)	1885	Japan
France–Korea Treaty of 1886*	조불수호통상조약(朝佛修好通商條約)	1886	France
Austria–Korea Treaty of 1892*	조오수호통상조약(朝奧修好通商條約)	1892	Austria
China–Korea Treaty of 1899	대한국·대청국통상조약 (大韓國大淸國通商條約)	1899	Qing (China)
Belgium–Korea Treaty of 1901*	조벨수호통상조약(朝白修好通商條約)	1901	Belgium
Denmark–Korea Treaty of 1902*	조덴수호통상조약(朝丁修好通商條約)	1902	Denmark
Japan–Korea Treaty of February 1904*	한일의정서(韓日議定書)	1904	Japan
Japan–Korea Agreement of August 1904*	제1차 한일협약 (第一次韓日協約)	1904	Japan
Japan–Korea Agreement of April 1905*		1905	Japan
Japan–Korea Agreement of August 1905*		1905	Japan
Japan–Korea Treaty of 1905* (Eulsa Treaty)	제2차 한일협약 (第二次韓日協約) (을사조약(乙巳條約))	1905	Japan
Japan–Korea Treaty of 1907*	정미7조약(丁未七條約)	1907	Japan
Japan–Korea Treaty of 1910*	한일병합조약(韓日倂合條約)	1910	Japan

* Unequal treaty

== Relevant articles ==
- Korean Confucianism
- History of Korea
- Political factions during the Joseon dynasty
- Society in the Joseon dynasty
- Empress Myeongseong

== Notes ==
Preceded by Goryeo dynasty politics	Joseon dynasty politics 1392–1897	Succeeded by Politics of South Korea; Politics of North Korea
