= Japan–Korea Agreement =

Japan–Korea Agreement may refer to:

- Japan–Korea Agreement of August 1904
- Japan–Korea Agreement of April 1905
- Japan–Korea Agreement of August 1905

== See also ==
- Japan–Korea Treaty (disambiguation)
