= Japan–Korea Treaty =

Japan–Korea Treaty may refer to:

- Japan–Korea Treaty of 1876
- Japan–Korea Treaty of 1882
- Japan–Korea Treaty of 1885
- Japan–Korea Treaty of 1905

== See also ==
- Japan–Korea Agreement (disambiguation)
