= Japan–Korea Treaty of 1904 =

The Japan–Korea Treaty of 1904 may refer to:

- Japan–Korea Treaty of February 1904
- Japan–Korea Agreement of August 1904
