= Unequal treaties =

Agreements imposed on Asian states

Chinese name
- Traditional Chinese: 不平等條約
- Simplified Chinese: 不平等条约
Transcriptions
Standard Mandarin
- Hanyu Pinyin: bùpíngděng tiáoyuē
- Wade–Giles: pu^{1} pʻing^{2} teng^{3} tʻiao^{2} yüeh^{1}
Yue: Cantonese
- Jyutping: bat1 ping4 dang2 tiu4 joek3

Korean name
- Hangul: 불평등 조약
- Hanja: 不平等條約
Transcriptions
- Revised Romanization: bulpyeongdeung joyak
- McCune–Reischauer: pulp'yŏngdŭng choyak

Japanese name
- Kanji: 不平等条約
Transcriptions
- Romanization: fu byōdō jōyaku

The unequal treaties were a series of agreements made between East Asian countries—most notably Qing China, Tokugawa Japan (in the 1850s) and Joseon Korea—and imperial powers—most notably the United Kingdom, France, Germany, Austria-Hungary, the Empire of Japan (starting in the late 1870s), Italy, Portugal, the United States and Russia—during the 19th and early 20th centuries. They were often signed following a military defeat suffered by the Asian party, or amid military threats made by the Western powers. The terms specified obligations to be borne almost exclusively by the Asian party and included provisions such as the cession of territory, payment of reparations, opening of treaty ports, relinquishment of the right to control tariffs and imports, and granting of extraterritoriality to foreign citizens.

With the rise of Chinese nationalism and anti-imperialism in the 1920s, both the Kuomintang (KMT) and the Chinese Communist Party (CCP) used the concept to characterize the Chinese experience of losing sovereignty between roughly 1840 to 1950. The term "unequal treaty" became associated with the concept of China's "century of humiliation", especially the concessions to foreign powers and the loss of tariff autonomy through treaty ports, and continues to serve as a major impetus for the foreign policy of China today.

Japan and Korea also use the term to refer to several treaties that resulted in a reduction of their national sovereignty. Japan and China signed treaties with Korea such as the Japan–Korea Treaty of 1876 and China–Korea Treaty of 1882, with each granting privileges to the former parties concerning Korea. Japan after the Meiji Restoration also began enforcing unequal treaties against China after its victory in the First Sino-Japanese War for influence over Korea as well as China's coastal ports and territories.

== China ==
The term "unequal treaties" refers to a series of one-sided agreements imposed upon China by foreign powers during the 19th and early 20th centuries. They were often signed following a Chinese capitulation from military defeats or threats. The terms specified obligations to be borne almost exclusively by China and included provisions such as ceding territory, paying reparations, opening treaty ports, relinquishing the right to control tariffs and imports, and granting extraterritoriality to foreign citizens. The earliest "unequal treaty" was the 1841 Convention of Chuenpi negotiations during the First Opium War, followed by the 1842 Treaty of Nanking. Because the unequal treaties all guaranteed most favoured nation for the foreign powers, if any foreign power gained additional advantages in China, these were automatically extended to provide parity to the other foreign powers.

The term was popularized in the 1920s by Sun Yat-sen to describe the treaties that were signed during the "treaty century". With the rise of Chinese nationalism and anti-imperialism, both the Kuomintang (KMT) and the Chinese Communist Party (CCP) used the concept to characterize the loss of Chinese sovereignty that started in the 1840s. In assessing the term's usage in rhetorical discourse since the early 20th century, American historian Dong Wang notes that "while the phrase has long been widely used, it nevertheless lacks a clear and unambiguous meaning" and that there is "no agreement about the actual number of treaties signed between China and foreign countries that should be counted as unequal." However, within the scope of Chinese historiographical scholarship, the phrase has typically been defined to refer to the many cases in which China was effectively forced to pay large amounts of financial reparations, open up ports for trade, cede or lease territories, and make various other concessions of sovereignty to foreign spheres of influence, following military threats. The Chinese-American sinologist Immanuel Hsu states that the Chinese viewed the treaties they signed with the foreign powers as unequal "because they were not negotiated by nations treating each other as equals but were imposed on China after a war, and because they encroached upon China's sovereign rights ... which reduced her to semicolonial status".

Treaty		Year	Imposer	Imposed on
English name	Chinese name	Year	Imposer	Imposed on
Treaty of Nanking	南京條約	1842	United Kingdom	Qing dynasty
Treaty of the Bogue	虎門條約	1843	United Kingdom	Qing dynasty
Treaty of Wanghia	中美望廈條約	1844	United States	Qing dynasty
Treaty of Whampoa	黃埔條約	1844	France	Qing dynasty
Treaty of Canton	中瑞廣州條約	1847	Sweden-Norway	Qing dynasty
Treaty of Kulja	中俄伊犁塔爾巴哈臺通商章程	1851	Russia	Qing dynasty
Treaty of Aigun	璦琿條約	1858	Russia	Qing dynasty
Treaty of Tientsin (1858)	天津條約	1858	France	Qing dynasty
Treaty of Tientsin (1858)	天津條約	1858	United Kingdom	Qing dynasty
Treaty of Tientsin (1858)	天津條約	1858	Russia	Qing dynasty
Treaty of Tientsin (1858)	天津條約	1858	United States	Qing dynasty
Convention of Peking	北京條約	1860	United Kingdom	Qing dynasty
Convention of Peking	北京條約	1860	France	Qing dynasty
Convention of Peking	北京條約	1860	Russia	Qing dynasty
Treaty of Tientsin (1861)	中德通商条约	1861	Prussia, also for Deutscher Zollverein	Qing dynasty
Chefoo Convention	煙臺條約	1876	United Kingdom	Qing dynasty
Treaty of Livadia	里瓦幾亞條約	1879	Russia	Qing dynasty
Treaty of Saint Petersburg	伊犁條約	1881	Russia	Qing dynasty
Treaty of Tientsin (1885)	中法新約	1885	France	Qing dynasty
Sino-Portuguese Treaty of Peking	中葡北京條約	1887	Portugal	Qing dynasty
Treaty of Shimonoseki (Treaty of Maguan)	馬關條約	1895	Japan	Qing dynasty
Li–Lobanov Treaty	中俄密約	1896	Russia	Qing dynasty
Convention for the Lease of the Liaotung Peninsula	旅大租地条约	1898	Russia	Qing dynasty
Convention for the Extension of Hong Kong Territory	展拓香港界址專條	1898	United Kingdom	Qing dynasty
Treaty of Kwangchow Wan	廣州灣租界條約	1899	France	Qing dynasty
Boxer Protocol	辛丑條約	1901	United Kingdom	Qing dynasty
Boxer Protocol	辛丑條約	1901	United States	Qing dynasty
Boxer Protocol	辛丑條約	1901	Japan	Qing dynasty
Boxer Protocol	辛丑條約	1901	Russia	Qing dynasty
Boxer Protocol	辛丑條約	1901	France	Qing dynasty
Boxer Protocol	辛丑條約	1901	Germany	Qing dynasty
Boxer Protocol	辛丑條約	1901	Italy	Qing dynasty
Boxer Protocol	辛丑條約	1901	Austria-Hungary	Qing dynasty
Boxer Protocol	辛丑條約	1901	Belgium	Qing dynasty
Boxer Protocol	辛丑條約	1901	Spain	Qing dynasty
Boxer Protocol	辛丑條約	1901	Netherlands	Qing dynasty
Sino-Swedish Treaty of 1908	中瑞通商條約	1908	Sweden	Qing dynasty
Simla Convention	西姆拉條約	1914	United Kingdom	Republic of China
Twenty-One Demands	二十一條	1915	Japan	Republic of China
Sino-Japanese Joint Defence Agreement	中日共同防敵軍事協定	1918	Japan	Republic of China
Tanggu Truce	塘沽協定	1933	Japan	Republic of China

== Japan ==
Prior to the Meiji Restoration, Japan was also subject to numerous unequal treaties. When the US expeditionary fleet led by Matthew Perry reached Japan in 1854 to force open the island nation for American trade, the country was compelled to sign the Convention of Kanagawa under the threat of violence by the American warships. This event abruptly terminated Japan's 220 years of seclusion under the Sakoku policy of 1633 under unilateral foreign pressure and consequentially, the convention has been seen in a similar light as an unequal treaty.

Another significant incident was the Tokugawa Shogunate's capitulation to the Harris Treaty of 1858, negotiated by the eponymous U.S. envoy Townsend Harris, which, among other concessions, established a system of extraterritoriality for foreign residents. This agreement would then serve as a model for similar treaties to be further signed by Japan with other foreign Western powers in the weeks to follow, such as the Ansei Treaties, which forcefully opened five Japanese ports, established extraterritoriality for foreigners and set fixed, low tariffs for Japan, which caused significant economic disruption and political outrage in Japan.

Unequal treaties with the United States and Europe also prevented Japan from unilaterally setting tariff rates on imported goods. As a result, it was hampered in developing domestic industries that could compete with imported goods.

The enforcement of these unequal treaties were a tremendous national shock for Japan's leadership as they both curtailed Japanese sovereignty for the first time in its history and also revealed the nation's growing weakness relative to the West through the latter's successful imposition of such agreements upon the island nation. An objective towards the recovery of national status and strength would become an overarching priority for Japan, with the treaty's domestic consequences being the end of the Bakufu and its 700 years of shogunate rule over Japan in 1868, and the establishment of a new imperial government known as the Empire of Japan.

The unequal treaties ended at various times for the countries involved and Japan's victories in the 1894–95 First Sino-Japanese War convinced many in the West that unequal treaties could no longer be enforced on Japan as it was a great power in its own right. The Anglo-Japanese Treaty of Commerce and Navigation in 1894, negotiated by Foreign Minister Mutsu Munemitsu, was the first successful move toward eliminating extraterritoriality which was fully achieved in 1899. This view gained more recognition following the Russo-Japanese War in 1905, whereby Japan most notably defeated Russia in a massive humiliation for the latter.

Treaty		Year	Imposer	Imposed on
English name	Japanese name	Year	Imposer	Imposed on
Convention of Kanagawa	日米和親条約	1854	United States	Tokugawa shogunate
Anglo-Japanese Friendship Treaty	日英和親条約	1854	United Kingdom	Tokugawa shogunate
Treaty of Shimoda	下田条約	1855	Russia	Tokugawa shogunate
Ansei Treaties				Tokugawa shogunate
Ansei Treaties	安政条約	1858	United States	Tokugawa shogunate
Ansei Treaties	安政条約	1858	Netherlands	Tokugawa shogunate
Ansei Treaties	安政条約	1858	Russia	Tokugawa shogunate
Ansei Treaties	安政条約	1858	United Kingdom	Tokugawa shogunate
Ansei Treaties	安政条約	1858	France	Tokugawa shogunate
Prussian-Japanese Treaty of Amity, Commerce and Navigation	日普修好通商条約	1861	Prussia	Tokugawa shogunate
Treaty of Amity, Commerce and Navigation between Austria and Japan	日墺修好通商航海条約	1868	Austria-Hungary	Japan
Spanish-Japanese Treaty of Amity, Commerce and Navigation	日西修好通商航海条約	1868	Spain	Japan
Retrocession following the Triple Intervention Convention of retrocession of the Liaodong Peninsula	遼東還付条約	1895	France; Russia; Germany	Japan

== Korea ==
Korea's first unequal treaty was not with the West, but instead with Japan. The Ganghwa Island incident in 1875 saw Japan send the warship Un'yō led by Captain Inoue Yoshika with the implied threat of military action to coerce the Korean kingdom of Joseon through the show of force. After an armed clash ensued around Ganghwa Island where the Japanese force was sent, which resulted in its victory, the incident subsequently forced Korea to open its doors to Japan by signing the Treaty of Ganghwa Island, also known as the Japan–Korea Treaty of 1876.

During this period Korea also signed treaties with Qing China and the West powers (such as the United Kingdom and the United States). In the case of Qing China, it signed the China–Korea Treaty of 1882 with Korea stipulating that Korea was a dependency of China and granted the Chinese extraterritoriality and other privileges, and in subsequent treaties China also obtained concessions in Korea, such as the Chinese concession of Incheon. However, Qing China lost its influence over Korea following the First Sino-Japanese War in 1895.

As Japanese dominance over the Korean peninsula grew in the following decades, it imposed more unequal treaties, beginning with the 1882 Treaty of Chemulpo, which allowed Japan to station troops in Korea following the Imo Incident. with respect to the unequal treaties imposed upon the kingdom by the Western powers (1882 Shufeldt Treaty), Korea's diplomatic concessions with those states became largely null and void by 1910, when it was annexed by Japan.

Treaty		Year	Imposer	Imposed on
English name	Korean name	Year	Imposer	Imposed on
Japan–Korea Treaty of 1876 (Treaty of Ganghwa)	강화도 조약 (江華島條約)	1876	Japan	Joseon dynasty
United States–Korea Treaty of 1882 (Shufeldt Treaty)	조미수호통상조약 (朝美修好通商條約)	1882	United States	Joseon dynasty
Japan–Korea Treaty of 1882 (Treaty of Chemulpo)	제물포 조약 (濟物浦條約)	1882	Japan	Joseon dynasty
China–Korea Treaty of 1882 (Joseon-Qing Communication and Commerce Rules)	조청상민수륙무역장정 (朝淸商民水陸貿易章程)	1882	Qing dynasty	Joseon dynasty
Germany–Korea Treaty of 1883	조독수호통상조약 (朝獨修好通商條約)	1883	Germany	Joseon dynasty
United Kingdom–Korea Treaty of 1883	조영수호통상조약 (朝英修好通商條約)	1883	United Kingdom	Joseon dynasty
Russia–Korea Treaty of 1884	조로수호통상조약 (朝露修好通商條約)	1884	Russia	Joseon dynasty
Italy–Korea Treaty of 1884	조이수호통상조약 (朝伊修好通商條約)	1884	Italy	Joseon dynasty
Japan–Korea Treaty of 1885 (Treaty of Hanseong)	한성조약 (漢城條約)	1885	Japan	Joseon dynasty
France–Korea Treaty of 1886	조불수호통상조약 (朝佛修好通商條約)	1886	France	Joseon dynasty
Austria–Korea Treaty of 1892	조오수호통상조약 (朝奧修好通商條約)	1892	Austria-Hungary	Joseon dynasty
Belgium–Korea Treaty of 1901	조벨수호통상조약 (朝白修好通商條約)	1901	Belgium	Korean Empire
Denmark–Korea Treaty of 1902	조덴수호통상조약 (朝丁修好通商條約)	1902	Denmark	Korean Empire
Japan–Korea Treaty of February 1904	한일의정서 (韓日議定書)	1904	Japan	Korean Empire
Japan–Korea Agreement of August 1904	제1차 한일협약 (第一次韓日協約)	1904	Japan	Korean Empire
Japan–Korea Agreement of April 1905	한일통신협정	1905	Japan	Korean Empire
Japan–Korea Agreement of August 1905	제2차 한일의정서	1905	Japan	Korean Empire
Japan–Korea Treaty of 1905	제2차 한일협약 (第二次韓日協約) (을사조약 (乙巳條約))	1905	Japan	Korean Empire
Japan–Korea Treaty of 1907	제3차 한일협약 (第三次韓日協約) (정미조약 (丁未條約))	1907	Japan	Korean Empire
Japan–Korea Treaty of 1910	한일병합조약 (韓日倂合條約)	1910	Japan	Korean Empire

== Ryukyu (Okinawa) ==
Treaty		Year	Imposer	Imposed on
English name	Okinawan or Classical Chinese	Year	Imposer	Imposed on
Convention between the Lew Chew Islands and the United States of America	琉米修好条約	1854	United States	Ryukyu Kingdom
Convention entre la France et les Iles Liou-tchou	琉仏修好条約	1855	France	Ryukyu Kingdom
Traktaat tusschen Nederlanden en Lioe-kioe	琉蘭修好条約	1859	Netherlands	Ryukyu Kingdom
Establishment of the Ryukyu Domain	琉球藩設置	1872	Japan	Ryukyu Kingdom
	六ヶ条の御達書 (令達)	1875	Japan	Ryukyu Kingdom
Ryukyu Annexation Proposal	琉球処分	1878-1879	Japan	Ryukyu Kingdom

== Vietnam ==
Treaty		Year	Imposer	Imposed on
English name	Vietnamese name	Year	Imposer	Imposed on
Treaty of Versailles (1787)	Hiệp ước Versailles (1787)	1767	Kingdom of France	Nguyễn lords
Bonard Treaty	Hòa ước Nhâm Tuất (壬戌和約)	1862	France	Đại Nam
Treaty of Huế (1863)	Hòa ước Quý Hợi (癸亥和約)	1863	France	Đại Nam
Draft Treaty of Aubaret	Hòa ước Giáp Tý(甲子和約)	1864	France	Đại Nam
Philastre treaty	Hòa ước Giáp Tuất (甲戌和約)	1874	France	Đại Nam
Harmand Treaty	Hòa ước Harmand (Hác-măng)) / Hòa ước Quý Mùi (癸未和約)	1883	France	Đại Nam
Patenôtre Treaty	Hòa ước Patenôtre (Pa-tơ-nốt) / Hòa ước Giáp Thân (甲申和約))	1884	France	Đại Nam

== Thailand ==
Treaty		Year	Imposer	Imposed on
English name	Thai name	Year	Imposer	Imposed on
Siamese–American Treaty of Amity and Commerce	สนธิสัญญาไมตรีและพาณิชย์ ค.ศ. 1833	1833	United States	Kingdom of Siam
Bowring Treaty	สนธิสัญญาเบาว์ริง	1855	United Kingdom	Kingdom of Siam
American–Siamese Treaty of 1856	สนธิสัญญาสหรัฐอเมริกา–สยาม พ.ศ. 2399	1856	United States	Kingdom of Siam
Franco-Siamese Treaty of 1856	สนธิสัญญาฝรั่งเศส–สยาม พ.ศ. 2399	1856	France	Kingdom of Siam
Danish-Siamese Treaty of 1858	สนธิสัญญาทางพระราชไมตรี การค้า และการเดินเรือ (ค.ศ. ๑๘๕๘)	1858	Denmark	Kingdom of Siam
Portuguese-Siamese Treaty of 1859	สนธิสัญญาทางพระราชไมตรี การค้า และการเดินเรือ (ค.ศ. 1859)	1859	Portugal	Kingdom of Siam
	สนธิสัญญาทางพระราชไมตรี การค้า และการเดินเรือ (ค.ศ. 1860)	1860	Netherlands	Kingdom of Siam
	สนธิสัญญาทางพระราชไมตรี การค้า และการเดินเรือ (ค.ศ. 1862)	1862	Prussia, also for Deutscher Zollverein	Kingdom of Siam
	สนธิสัญญาทางพระราชไมตรี การค้า และการเดินเรือ (ค.ศ. 1863)	1863	Belgium	Kingdom of Siam
	สนธิสัญญาทางพระราชไมตรี การค้า และการเดินเรือ (ค.ศ. 1863)	1863	Italy	Kingdom of Siam
	สนธิสัญญาทางพระราชไมตรี การค้า และการเดินเรือ (ค.ศ. 1863)	1863	Sweden-Norway	Kingdom of Siam
Italo-Siamese Treaty of 1868	สนธิสัญญาทางพระราชไมตรี การค้า และการเดินเรือ (ค.ศ. 1868)	1868	Italy	Kingdom of Siam
	สนธิสัญญาทางพระราชไมตรี การค้า และการเดินเรือ (ค.ศ. 1869)	1869	Austria-Hungary	Kingdom of Siam
	สนธิสัญญาทางพระราชไมตรี การค้า และการเดินเรือ (ค.ศ. 1870)	1870	Spain	Kingdom of Siam
Franco-Siamese Treaty of 1893	สนธิสัญญาสยาม–ฝรั่งเศส ร.ศ. 112	1893	France	Kingdom of Siam
	สนธิสัญญาทางพระราชไมตรี การค้า และการเดินเรือ (ค.ศ. 1898)	1898	Japan	Kingdom of Siam
	สนธิสัญญาทางพระราชไมตรี การค้า และการเดินเรือ (ค.ศ. 1899)	1899	Russia	Kingdom of Siam
Franco-Siamese Treaty of 1904	สนธิสัญญาสยาม–ฝรั่งเศส ร.ศ. 122	1904	France	Kingdom of Siam
Franco-Siamese Treaty of 1907	สนธิสัญญาสยาม–ฝรั่งเศส ร.ศ. 125	1907	France	Kingdom of Siam
Anglo-Siamese Treaty of 1909	สนธิสัญญาอังกฤษ–สยาม พ.ศ. 2452	1909	United Kingdom	Kingdom of Siam
Treaty of Alliance of 1941	สนธิสัญญาพันธมิตร ค.ศ. 2484	1941	Japan	Thailand
Gentlemen Agreement of 1961	ข้อตกลงสุภาพบุรุษ ค.ศ. 2504	1961	United States	Thailand
Treaty of Amity and Economic Relations	สนธิสัญญาไมตรีและความสัมพันธ์ทางเศรษฐกิจ	1966	United States	Thailand

== Nepal ==
Treaty		Year	Imposer	Imposed on
English name	Nepali name	Year	Imposer	Imposed on
Treaty of Sugauli	सुगौली सन्धि	1816	United Kingdom	Nepal

== Bhutan ==
Treaty		Year	Imposer	Imposed on
English name	Dzhonga name	Year	Imposer	Imposed on
Treaty of Sinchula	སིན་ཅུ་ལའི་ཆིངས་ཡིག།	1865	United Kingdom	Kingdom of Bhutan
Treaty of Punakha	སྤུ་ན་ཁའི་ཆིངས་ཡིག།	1910	United Kingdom	Kingdom of Bhutan
Treaty of Friendship of 1949	༡༩༤༩ ལོའི་མཛའ་མཐུན་ཆིངས་ཡིག།	1949	India	Bhutan

== See also ==
- Century of humiliation
- China Centenary Missionary Conference
- Client state
- Foreign concessions in China
- List of Chinese treaty ports
- List of treaties of China before the People's Republic
- Most favoured nation
- Normanton incident
- Puppet state
- Sick man of Asia
- Trianon syndrome
- Western imperialism in Asia

Other unequal treaties outside East Asia:

- 1855 Bowring Treaty (Thailand)
- 1828 Treaty of Turkmenchay (Iran)
- Capitulations of the Ottoman Empire
