= Japan–Korea Treaty of 1907 =

Unequal treaty between Korea and Japan

Japanese name
- Kanji: 第三次日韓協約
- Hiragana: だいさんじにっかんきょうやく
Transcriptions
- Revised Hepburn: Dai-sanji Nikkan Kyōyaku

Korean name
- Hangul: 정미조약 or 한·일 신협약
- Hanja: 丁未條約 or 韓日新協約
Transcriptions
- Revised Romanization: Jeongmi joyak or Hanil Sinhyeobyak
- McCune–Reischauer: Chŏngmi choyak or Hanil Sinhyŏbyak

Alternative Korean name
- Hangul: 제3차 한일협약
- Hanja: 第三次日韓協約
Transcriptions
- Revised Romanization: Jesamcha Hanil Hyeobyak
- McCune–Reischauer: Chesamch'a Hanil Hyŏbyak

The Japan–Korea Treaty of 1907(Korean: 한일신협약) was made between the Empire of Japan and the Korean Empire in 1907. Negotiations were concluded on July 24, 1907.

== Treaty provisions ==
The treaty provided that Korea should act under the guidance of a Japanese resident general. The effect of the treaty's provisions was that the administration of internal affairs was turned over to Japan.

The Korean Empire had become a protectorate of Japan under the terms of the earlier Eulsa Treaty on 1905, and had thus lost the right to conduct diplomatic exchanges with other countries. Korean Emperor Gojong sent an envoy in secret to the Hague Conference on World Peace to protest Japan's actions. In retaliation, on July 18, 1907, Japan made Emperor Gojong abdicate in favor of his son Sunjong.

Six days later, a new agreement was forced on the Korean government. Provisions in this new treaty gave the Japanese Resident-General the right to appoint and dismiss high-ranking officials (article 4) and stipulated that all high-ranking officials appointed to the Korean government must be Japanese (article 5). This brought the internal government of Korea fully under the control of Japan. The unpublished section of the treaty also placed the Korean army under Japanese leadership, and handed over judicial and policing powers.

== Translation of full text ==
"The Governments of Japan and Korea, with a view to the early attainment of prosperity and strength in Korea and the speedy promotion of the welfare of the Korean people, have agreed upon and concluded the follow stipulations:

- Article I. The Government of Korea shall follow the directions of the Resident General in connection with the reform of administration.
- Article II. Korea shall not enact any law or ordinance or carry out any administrative measure unless it has previous approval of the Resident General.
- Article III. The judicial affairs of Korea shall be kept distinct from ordinary administrative affairs.
- Article IV. No appointment or dismissal of Korean officials of high grade shall be made without the consent of the Resident General.
- Article V. Korea shall appoint to official positions such Japanese as are recommended by the Resident General.
- Article VI. Korea shall not engage any foreigner without the consent of the Resident general.
- Article VII. The first clause of the agreement between Japan and Korea, dated Aug 22, 1904, is hereby abrogated."

Lord Itō Hirobumi [Marquess], Resident-General, July 24, 40th year of the Meiji era [1907] (seal)
Sir Lee Wan-Yong, Prime Minister, July 24, 11th year of the Gwangmu era [1907] (seal)

=== Diplomatic Memorandum (unpublished) ===
Based on the import of the Japan-Korea treaty of the 40th year of the Meiji era, the following items shall be enacted.

(1) The following courts, composed of people from both Japan and Korea, shall be newly established.

- 1 One Supreme Court (大審院, daishin'in) located in Gyeongseong Seoul or Suwon.

The President (院長, inchō) and Attorney General (檢事總長, kenjisōchō; modern kanji 検事総長) of the Court shall be Japanese. Two of the Justices (判事, hanji) and five of the secretaries (書記) shall be Japanese.

- 2 Three Courts of Appeal (控訴院, kōsoin)

One shall be located in the central region, and one each in the northern and southern regions. Two of the Justices, one of the attorneys (檢事, kenji; modern kanji 検事) and five of the secretaries shall be Japanese.

- 3 Eight District Courts (地方裁判所, chihō saibansho)

One of these shall be located at each of the locations of the prosecutor's offices (觀察府所在地, kansatsufu shozaichi; modern kanji 観察府所在地) in the eight former provinces (道, dō) The chief prosecutors (所長, shochō) and head attorneys (檢事正, kenji; modern kanji 検事正) shall be Japanese. 32 of all attorneys and 80 of all secretaries shall be Japanese, and shall be allocated as appropriate given the degree of work required.

- 4 103 Ward Courts (區裁判所, ku saibansho; modern kanji: 区裁判所)

Thesе are to be located in the locations of important regional offices (郡衙, gunga) One of the attorneys and one of the secretaries is to be Japanese.

(2) The following prisons shall be newly established.

- 1 Nine prisons

One prison shall be located in the same area as each of the district courts, and one prison on one of the islands. The governor (典獄, tengoku) shall be Japanese. Half the prison staff, consisting of the head warden (看守長, kanshuchō) and levels below, shall be Japanese.

(3) Military forces shall be arranged as follows.

- The first battalion (一大隊, ichidaitai) of the army, assigned to guarding the Emperor and other duties, shall be disbanded.
- Educated officers (士官, shikan) shall be assigned to the Japanese army for training in the field, except where it is necessary for them to remain in the Korean army.
- Appropriate provisions shall be made in Japan for training Korean soldiers to become officers.

(4) All those currently in the service of Korea with the position of advisor (問顧, komon) or parliamentary councillor (參與官, san'yokan; modern kanji 参与官) shall be removed from their duties.

(5) The following Japanese shall be appointed as officials in the Korean central government (中央政府, chūō seifu) and local authorities (地方廳, chihōchō; modern kanji 地方庁).

- Vice ministers (次官, jikan) for each department
- The chief of the internal police (内部警務局長, naibu keimu kyokuchō)
- One police commissioner (警務使, keimushi) and one deputy commissioner (副警務使, fuku-keimushi)
- For the cabinet, several secretaries (書記官, shokikan) and assistant secretaries (書記郎, shokirō)
- For each department, several secretaries and assistant secretaries
- An administrator (事務官, jimukan) for each province
- One head of the police (警務官, keimukan) for each province
- Several local secretaries (主事, shuji) for each province

The matter of other appointments of Japanese as officials in the areas of finance, policing and technology shall be set down by a later agreement.

== See also ==
- Japan–Korea Treaty of February 1904
- Japan–Korea Treaty of 1905
- Japan–Korea Treaty of 1910
- Anglo-Japanese Alliance
- Taft–Katsura Agreement
- Treaty of Portsmouth
- Root–Takahira Agreement
- Unequal treaty
- Battle of Namdaemun
