= List of ambassadors of Italy to South Korea =

Ambassador of Italy to South Korea
- Ambasciatore d'Italia nella Repubblica di Corea con accreditamento anche nella Repubblica Democratica Popolare di Corea.
- Emblem of Italy
- Incumbent; Emilia Gatto since September 11, 2023
- Style: Her Excellency
- Inaugural holder: Francesco Rausi
- Formation: March 1, 2002
- Website: http://www.ambseoul.esteri.it/ambasciata_seoul/it/

The Italian ambassador to South Korea is the diplomatic representative of the Italian government to the government of South Korea.

The list of ambassadors from Italy to South Korea began long after diplomatic relations were established in 1884. The current official title of this diplomat is "Ambassador of the Republic of Italy to the Republic of Korea."

Italian-Korean diplomatic relations were initially established during the Joseon period of Korean history.

After the Italy-Korea Treaty of 1884 was negotiated, ministers from Italy could have been appointed in accordance with this treaty. However, diplomatic affairs were initially handled by the Italian representative in Shanghai.

== List of heads of mission ==
=== Ambassadors ===
- March 1, 2002-June 5, 2006: Francesco Rausi
- August 26, 2006-2010: Massimo Andrea Leggeri
- February 8, 2011: Sergio Mercuri
- October 1, 2014: Marco della Seta (* born June 6, 1962 in Milan)
- March 1, 2019: Federico Failla
- September 11, 2023: Emilia Gatto

== See also ==
- Italy-Korea Treaty of 1884
- List of diplomatic missions in South Korea
