= China–Korea Treaty of 1882 =

The China–Korea Treaty of 1882 (Chinese: 中朝商民水陸貿易章程; Korean: 조청상민수륙무역장정) was negotiated between representatives of the Qing dynasty China and the Joseon dynasty in October 1882. This agreement has been described as the Joseon-Qing Communication and Commerce Rules; and it has been called the Sino-Korean Regulations for Maritime and Overland Trade. The treaty remained in effect until 1895. After 1895, China lost its influence over Korea because of the First Sino-Japanese War.

== Background ==
In 1876, Korea established a trade treaty with Japan after Japanese ships approached Ganghwado. Treaty negotiations with several Western countries were made possible by the completion of this initial Japanese overture.

In 1882, the Americans concluded a treaty and established diplomatic relations, which served as a template for subsequent negotiations with other Western powers.

Two weeks after the United States–Korea Treaty of 1882, a military revolt called Imo Incident occurred in Seoul. The soldiers occupied Changdeok Palace, and the Korean government asked for military help from China. The revolt was suppressed by Chinese troops. After the incident, Chinese political influence over Korea started.

== Treaty provisions ==
The Chinese and Koreans negotiated and approved a multi-article treaty with provisions affecting Korean diplomatic relations with Western nations.

The Joseon-Qing Communication and Commerce Rules sought to mitigate the effects of increased diplomatic intercourse and expanded commercial relations with Western powers. The negotiated agreement caused unintended consequences.

== See also ==
- Unequal treaties
- China-Korea Treaty of 1899
- Chinese concession of Incheon
