= Hwangsŏng sinmun =

1898–1910 daily newspaper in Korea

Hwangsŏng Sinmun
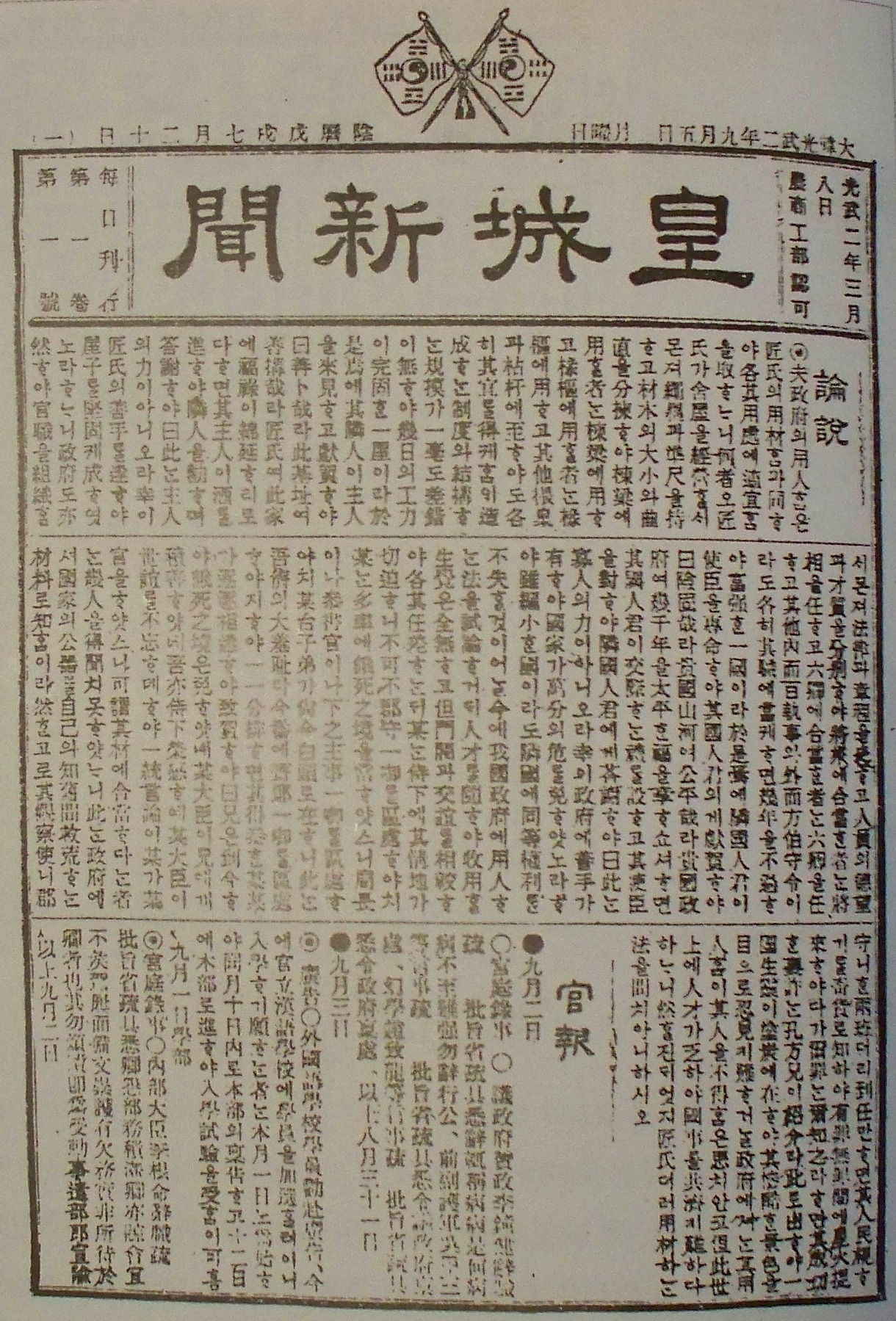
- Inaugural edition of the Hwangsŏng Sinmun (1898)
- Founder(s): Namkung Ŏk; Na Su-yŏn
- Founded: September 5, 1898
- Ceased publication: September 14, 1910
- City: Seoul
- Country: Korean Empire
- Circulation: 3,000

- Hwangsŏng sinmun
- Hangul: 황성신문
- Hanja: 皇城新聞
- Revised Romanization: Hwangseong Sinmun
- McCune–Reischauer: Hwangsŏng Sinmun

The Hwangsŏng Sinmun (Korean: 황성신문; Hanja: 皇城新聞), also known as Capital Gazette or Imperial Capital Gazette, was a Korean-language daily newspaper published in the Korean Empire between 1898 and 1910. For two weeks before it closed, the newspaper went by the name Hansŏng Sinmun.

== History ==
It was established on September 5, 1898 by Namkung Ŏk and Na Su-yŏn, in the Gwanghwamun area of Seoul. The paper was publicly owned. They set a goal of selling 500 shares, amounting to 5,000 won, but they eventually launched with half that amount. Editors of the paper included Yu Kŭn (유근; 柳瑾), Park Eun-sik, and later Chang Chi-yŏn. Namkung led the paper from the newspaper's founding until August 1902. During this time, he was arrested twice. Chang was elected the second president on August 31, 1902.

The paper was progressive, and sought to advocate for Korea's education and independence during a time when the Empire of Japan was encroaching on Korean sovereignty. It published a number of critical articles about Japan's behavior in Korea. It also served as an alternative to another contemporary reformist newspaper, The Independent, which had strong Christian leanings.

The initial version of the newspaper was small, and printed on a 23 cm × 31 cm (9.1 in × 12.2 in) sheet. It was published in Korean mixed script (Hangul and Hanja). It ordered its content similarly to other Korean papers of the time, with editorials first, miscellaneous and society articles second, and advertisements third. Beginning on November 13, 1899, it began publishing issues of four pages, each with four columns, on larger sheets: 34.5 cm × 25.2 cm (13.6 in × 9.9 in). It began publishing literature and articles on history. On January 5, 1900, it began publishing international stories it received from British news agency Reuters. Throughout its thirteen years of publishing, the subscription rates for the paper hovered around 3,000 copies.

The paper struggled with financial issues. By 1900, around half the paper consisted of advertisements. The paper published a number of statements openly discussing its finances, including one on February 5, 1903 that claimed they would have no choice but to stop publishing. In that article, they claimed to have around 3,000 subscribers, with a monthly subscription fee of 1,500 won and printing expenses of 830 won. However, they revealed that missed payments from subscribers totaled to around 7,000 won, and that printing expenses had risen to around 2,000 won per month. They received donations ranging from 10 to 200 won, and were able to resume publication, although they continued experiencing financial difficulties.

On February 24, 1904, it published details of the Japan–Korea Treaty of February 1904, but the issue was met with censorship. To dodge the censorship, the newspaper republished the article but with its characters in reverse order.

On November 20, 1905, it published a famous editorial written by Chang entitled I Wail Bitterly Today. In response, the newspaper was forcefully suspended, and Chang and around nine other staff were arrested. On January 24, 1906, Chang was released and the suspension was lifted. However, due to financial issues as a result of the suspension, they were only able to resume publication on February 12.

On February 17, Chang, the vice president, and several other leaders resigned from their leadership positions. Namkung Hun (남궁훈; 南宮薰) became the third president. On May 18, 1907, Kim Sang-ch'ŏn was elected president.

Upon Japan's formal annexation of Korea on August 29, 1910, they were forced to change the name of the paper to Hansŏng Sinmun (한성신문; 漢城新聞; lit. Hanseong (Seoul) Newspaper). They continued publication for two more weeks afterwards, until they published their final issue, No. 3470, on September 14.

== See also ==
- Cheguk Sinmun – Contemporary Korean newspaper
- List of newspapers in Korea – Newspapers before 1945
- History of newspapers in Korea
