= Tyler Dennett =

American historian

- Born: June 13, 1883; Spencer, Wisconsin, U.S.
- Died: December 29, 1949 (aged 66); Geneva, New York, U.S.
- Education: Williams College (BA); Union Theological Sem. (BD); Johns Hopkins University (PhD)
- Occupations: Historian; educator; writer

Tyler Dennett

3rd Department of State Historian
- In office 1924–1931
- Preceded by: Harry Dwight
- Succeeded by: David Hunter Miller

Tyler Dennett (June 13, 1883 Spencer, Wisconsin – December 29, 1949 in Geneva, New York) was an American historian and educator. He received the 1934 Pulitzer Prize for Biography or Autobiography for his 1933 book John Hay: From Poetry to Politics.

== Early career and education ==
Born in Wisconsin, but raised in Rhode Island, Dennett graduated high school as valedictorian from the Moses Brown School in Providence. In 1900, Dennett enrolled at Bates College and then transferred to Williams College as a sophomore. At Williams, he was a member of the football team. After his graduation in the spring of 1904 and a year of work in Williamstown, Massachusetts he attended the Union Theological Seminary, where he was awarded a Bachelor of Divinity in 1908. He served briefly as a Congregational minister before leaving to pursue a career in journalism.

== Career ==
Among his early scholarly writings were The Democratic Movement in Asia (1918) and A Better World (1920). In 1922, he published Americans in Eastern Asia, a study of American policy in the Far East, which was well received and was long held as an important work in the field. Dennett published "President Roosevelt's Secret Pact with Japan" in 1924, the subject of which came to be known as the Taft–Katsura Agreement. The paper put forth the thesis that formerly-isolationist Japan and the US began to carve up their spheres of influence, which would later become world empires, with the agreement, which was therefore of first-class importance historically. Later historians questioned that interpretation. Dennett was awarded a Ph.D. in history from Johns Hopkins University in 1925 based on this research on Theodore Roosevelt and the Russo-Japanese War.

He taught American history at Johns Hopkins University (1923–24) and at Columbia University (1927–28), and international relations at Princeton University (1931–34). Most significantly, Dennett served as president of Williams College (1934–37), resigning after a disagreement with the college's board of trustees. The trustees planned to purchase the Greylock Hotel, which later became a dorm, but at the time Dennett felt the hotel had no useful purpose for the college. Dennett was also one of the future college presidents to speak out against Nazi Germany during this period, ending academic exchange programs with Nazi Germany in 1936.

He received the 1934 Pulitzer Prize for Biography or Autobiography for his book, John Hay: From Poetry to Politics (1933).

== Death ==
He died in Geneva, New York in 1949.
