= I Wail Bitterly Today =

1905 Korean-language newspaper editorial

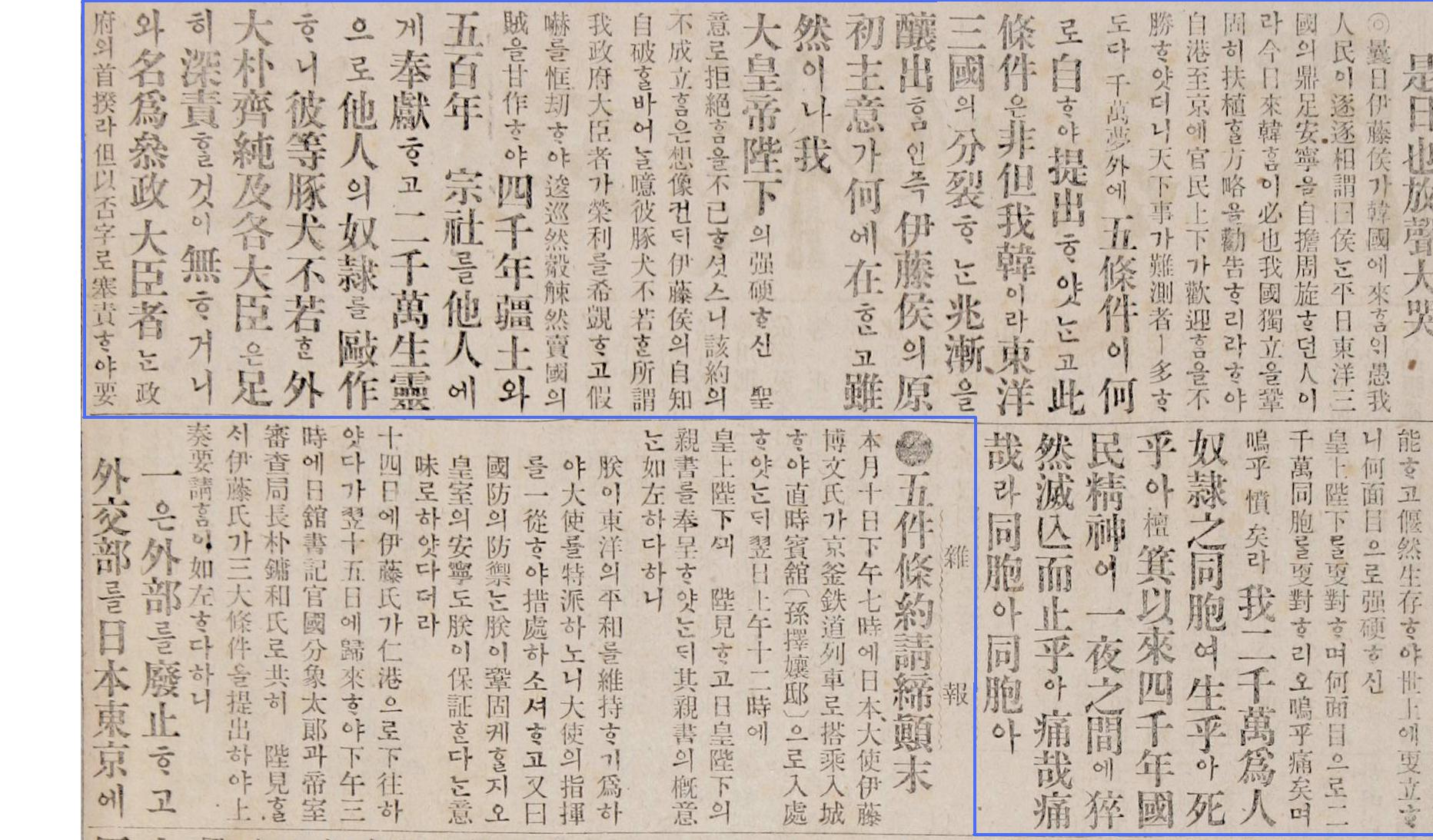
Photo of the page the editorial was on (everything within the blue polygon; i.e. everything other than the bottom left quadrant)

"I Wail Bitterly Today" (Korean: 시일야방성대곡; Hanja: 是日也放聲大哭; alternatively 이 날에 목놓아 통곡하노라) is a historic Korean-language newspaper editorial. It was originally published on November 20, 1905 in the Hwangsŏng Shinmun, and written by Chang Chi-yŏn, the editor-in-chief of the newspaper.

== Background ==
Around the time of the newspaper's publication, the Empire of Japan was moving to absorb Korea. The editorial was written in direct response to the Japan–Korea Treaty of 1905, which placed Korea under the indirect rule of a Japanese Resident-General. The editorial criticized the treaty, the ministers who signed it, and Japanese politician Itō Hirobumi, who had contributed significantly to the treaty's creation. It was widely circulated and is considered representative of the Korean reaction to the establishment of a Japanese protectorate.

The text was originally written in mixed script (Hangul and Hanja).

== Text ==
When it was recently made known the Marquis Itō would come to Korea our deluded people all said, with one voice, that he is the man who will be responsible for the maintenance of friendship of between the three countries of the Far East, and, believing that his visit to Korea was for the sole purpose of devising good plans for strictly maintaining the promised integrity and independence of Korea, our people, from the seacoast to the capital, united in extending to him a hearty welcome.

But oh! How difficult is it to anticipate affairs in this world. Without warning, a proposal containing five clauses was laid before Emperor Gwangmu, and we then saw how mistaken we were about the object of Marquis Ito's visit. However, the Emperor firmly refused to have anything to do with these proposals and Marquis Ito should then, properly, have abandoned his attempt and returned to his own country.

But the Ministers of our Government, who are worse than pigs or dogs, coveting honours and advantages for themselves, and frightened by empty threats, were trembling in every limb, and were willing to become traitors to their country and betray to Japan the integrity of a nation which has stood for 4,000 years, the foundation and honour of a dynasty 500 years old, and the rights and freedom of twenty million people.

We do not wish to too deeply blame Pak Chesun and other Ministers, of whom, as they are little better than brute animals, too much was not to be expected, but what can be said of the Vice-Prime Minister, the chief of the Cabinet, whose early opposition to the proposals of Marquis Ito was an empty form devised to enhance his reputation with the people?

Is it worth while for any of us to live any longer? Our people have become the slaves of others, and the spirit of a nation which has stood for 4,000 years, since the days of Tun Kun has perished in a single night. Alas! fellow-countrymen. Alas!

— Chang Chi-yŏn, translation published by Frederick Arthur MacKenzie

== Aftermath ==
The editorial was hailed in Korea. It was republished by other newspapers of the time, including The Korea Daily News and even the Japan-based, English-language publication Japan Chronicle. The editorial caused the newspaper's publication to be forcefully ceased for a period of three months, as Chang was arrested and imprisoned.
