= Japan–Korea Agreement of April 1905 =

Treaty between Japan and Korea in 1905

The Japan–Korea Agreement of April 1905 (Korean: 한일통신기관협정서; Hanja: 韓日通信機關協定書; RR: Han-il Tongsin Gigwan Hyeopjeongseo; MR: Han-il T'ongsin Kigwan Hyŏpchŏngsŏ; 日韓通信業務合同) was made between the Empire of Japan and the Korean Empire in 1905.. Negotiations were concluded on 1 April 1905.

== Treaty provisions ==
This treaty transferring responsibility for postal, telegraph, and telephone service to Japan.

The provisions of the treaty encompassed the right of eminent domain or condemnation against public property and against private property. In this context, the treaty provided for no compensation or payments except that Japan "shall deliver to the Korean Government a suitable percentage" of the profits.

The treaty preamble asserted that the Envoy Extraordinary and Minister Plenipotentiary of His Majesty the Emperor of Japan and the Minister of State for Foreign Affairs of His Majesty the Emperor of Korea were "respectively duly empowered" to negotiate and to agree upon the specific language of the proposed bilateral treaty:

- Article I.

The Imperial Government of Korea shall transfer and assign the control and administration of the post, telegraph and telephone services in Korea (except the telephone service exclusively pertaining to the Department of the Imperial Household) to the Imperial Japanese Government.

- Article II.

The land, buildings, furnitures, instruments, machines and all other appliances connected with the system of communications already established by the Imperial Government of Korea, shall, by virtue of the present Agreement, be transferred to the control of the Imperial Japanese Government. The authorities of the two countries acting together shall make an inventory of the land, buildings and all other requisites mentioned in the preceding paragraph which shall serve as evidence in the future.

- Article III.

When it is deemed necessary by the Japanese Government to extend the communication system in Korea, they may appropriate land and buildings belonging to the State or to private persons, the former without compensation and the latter with proper indemnification.

- Article IV.

In respect of the control of the communication service and the custody of the properties in connection therewith, the Japanese Government assume, on their own account, the responsibility of good administration. The expenses required for the extension of the communication services shall also be borne by the Imperial Government of Japan. The Imperial Government of Japan shall officially notify the Imperial Government of Korea of the financial condition of the system of communications under their control.

- Article V.

All appliances and materials which are deemed necessary by the Imperial Government of Japan for the control or extension of the system of communication shall be exempt from all duties and imposts.

- Article VI.

The Imperial Government of Korea shall be at liberty to maintain the present Board of Communication so far as such retention does not interfere with the control and extension of the services by the Japanese Government. The Japanese Government, in controlling and extending the services, shall engage as many Korean officials and employees as possible.

- Article VII.

In respect of the arrangements formerly entered into by the Korean Government with the Governments of foreign Powers concerning the post, telegraph and telephone services, the Japanese Government shall in behalf of Korea exercise the rights and perform the obligations pertaining thereto ....

- Article VIII.

The various conventions and agreements respecting the communication services hitherto existing between the Governments of Japan and Korea are naturally abolished or modified by the present Agreement.

- Article IX.

When in future as the result of the general development of the communication system in Korea, there is some adequate profit over and above expenditures defrayed by the Japanese Government for the control and maintenance of the old services and for their extensions and improvements, the Japanese Government shall deliver to the Korean Government a suitable percentage of such profit.

- Article X.

When in the future an ample surplus exists in the finance of the Korean Government, the control of their communication services may be returned, as the result of the consultation of the two Governments, to the Government of Korea.

Hayashi Gonsuke, Envoy Extraordinary and Minister Plenipotentiary (dated 1 April 1905, the 38th year of Meiji)
Yi Ha-yeong, Minister of State for Foreign Affairs (dated 1 April 1905, the 9th year of Gwangmu)

== Recision ==
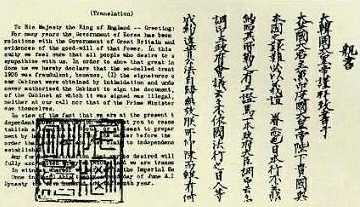
Gojong's analysis of the "treaty of 1905" – just one of many efforts to invalidate the consequences of a coercive process.

This "alleged treaty" was contrived in a coercive process; and Koreans sought to invalidate the unwanted consequences by presenting evidence to the international community. For example,

- 1905: Emperor Gojong of the Korean Empire wrote personally to the heads of state in those countries having treaties with Korea; and the Korean government filed formal appeals and sent formal cable notices, but these diplomatic gestures were unavailing.
- 1907: In what is sometimes called the "Hague Secret Emissary Affair," Korean emissaries sought unsuccessfully to seek international assistance at the Hague Convention of 1907 at The Hague, Netherlands in 1907.
- 1921: Korean representatives attempted to gain a hearing at the Washington Naval Conference of 1921; but the effort was ineffective.

This treaty was confirmed to be "already null and void" by Treaty on Basic Relations between Japan and the Republic of Korea concluded in 1965. In 2010, Japan argued that the chronological point of reference for "already null and void" was August 15, 1948, when the government of the Republic of Korea was established. This point of view is disputed by the Korean analysis, which construes the 1965 treaty as acknowledgment of the nullification of all Japanese-Korean treaties and agreements from 1904 onwards.

== See also ==
- Unequal treaty
- Japan–Korea Treaty of February 1904
- Japan–Korea Agreement of August 1904
- Japan–Korea Agreement of August 1905
- Japan–Korea Treaty of 1905
