= Japan–Korea Agreement of August 1905 =

1905 treaty between Japan and Korea

- Signed: August 13, 1905
- Signatories: Empire of Japan; Korean Empire
- Parties: Japan; Korea
- Ratifiers: Japan; Korea
- Language: Japanese; Korean

The Japan–Korea Agreement of August 1905 was made between representatives of the Empire of Japan and the Korean Empire in 1905. Negotiations were concluded on August 13, 1905.

Japan–Korea Agreement of August 1905

Japanese name
- Kanji: 日韓議定書
- Hiragana: ひかんぎていしょ

Korean name
- Hangul: 한일의정서
- Hanja: 韓日議政書
Transcriptions
- Revised Romanization: Hanil Euijeong Seo

== Treaty provisions ==
This treaty granted permission to Japanese vessels to navigate coastal and inland waters of Korea.

The treaty preamble asserted that the Envoy Extraordinary and Minister Plenipotentiary of His Majesty the Emperor of Japan and the Minister of State for Foreign Affairs of His Majesty the Emperor of Korea were "respectively duly empowered" to negotiate and to agree upon the specific language of the proposed bilateral treaty:

- Article I.

Japanese vessels shall be at liberty to navigate along the coasts and in inland waters of Korea for the purpose of trade in accordance with the stipulations of the present Agreement, which, however, shall not be applicable to navigation between the open ports.

- Article II.

Licenses shall be obtained for all Japanese vessels to be employed in navigation of the coasts and inland waters, upon reporting through the Japanese Consular Officers to the Korean Customs the names and residence of the owners, the names, types and carrying capacity of the vessels, as well as the limits within which such vessels are to navigate. Licenses shall be available for one year from the date of their issue.

- Article III.

Upon receipt of the licenses, fees shall be paid to the Korean Customs ....

- Article IV.

Japanese vessels may freely navigate within the limits specified, but shall not proceed to any place not in Korean territory, except in case of stress of weather or other emergency, or in case special permission has been obtained from the Korean Customs.

- Article V.

The licenses shall be carried on board the vessels during their voyages and shall be shown whenever requested by the Korean Customs, or by local officials of Korea, or by the Chiefs of villages duly authorized by such local officials.

- Article VI.

Japanese shipowners shall have liberty to lease land for the purpose of building warehouses at the places where their vessels call. Such owners may also construct piers or wharves on the banks and coasts with the permission of the Korean Customs.

- Article VII.

In case of infraction of the present Agreement by a Japanese vessel, the Korean Customs may cause the license of such vessel to be confiscated, or may refuse to issue a new one, if the offence be found, upon examination, to be of a grave nature.

- Article VIII.

When a Japanese vessel, or the crew thereof, infringes the stipulations of the present Agreement or of other treaties, or when a member of the crew commits any crime, the Japanese Consular Officers shall deal with the case in accordance with the provisions of the treaties and the laws of Japan.

- Article. IX.

The present Agreement shall remain in force for a period of fifteen years from the date of its signature, and after the expiration of such period, further arrangements may be made by mutual agreement.

Hayashi Gonsuke, Envoy Extraordinary and Minister Plenipotentiary (dated, the 13th day of the 8th month of the 38th year of Meiji)
Yi Ha-yeong, Minister of State for Foreign Affairs (dated, the 13th day of the 8th month of the 9th year of Gwangmu)

== Recision ==
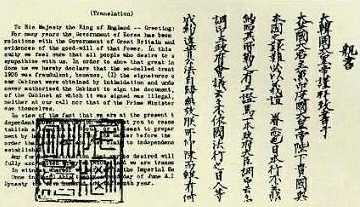
Gojong's analysis of the "treaty of 1905" – just one of many efforts to invalidate the consequences of a coercive process.

This "alleged treaty" was contrived in a coercive process; and Koreans sought to invalidate the unwanted consequences by presenting evidence to the international community. For example,

- 1905: Emperor Gojong of the Korean Empire wrote personally to the heads of state in those countries having treaties with Korea; and the Korean government filed formal appeals and sent formal cable notices, but these diplomatic gestures were unavailing.
- 1907: In what is sometimes called the "Hague Secret Emissary Affair," Korean emissaries sought unsuccessfully to seek international assistance at the Hague Convention of 1907 at The Hague, Netherlands in 1907.
- 1921: Korean representatives attempted to gain a hearing at the Washington Naval Conference of 1921; but the effort was ineffective.

This treaty was confirmed to be "already null and void" by Treaty on Basic Relations between Japan and the Republic of Korea concluded in 1965. In 2010, Japan argued that the chronological point of reference for "already null and void" was August 15, 1948, when the government of the Republic of Korea was established. This point of view is disputed by the Korean analysis, which construes the 1965 treaty as acknowledgment of the nullification of all Japanese-Korean treaties and agreements from 1904 onwards.

== See also ==
- Unequal treaty
- Japan–Korea Treaty of February 1904
- Japan–Korea Agreement of August 1904
- Japan–Korea Agreement of April 1905
- Japan–Korea Treaty of 1905
