= Threat of force (public international law) =

Concept in international law

Threat of force in public international law is a situation between states described by British lawyer Ian Brownlie as:

an express or implied promise by a government of a resort to force conditional on non-acceptance of certain demands of that government.

The 1969 Vienna Convention on the Law of Treaties notes in its preamble that both the threat and the use of force are prohibited. Moreover, in Article 52, it establishes the principle that if threats of using force are made during diplomatic negotiations, then any resulting treaty is invalid, stating "A treaty is void if its conclusion has been procured by the threat or use of force in violation of the principles of international law embodied in the Charter of the United Nations".

== Philosophical and legal roots ==
The evolution towards prohibiting the threat of force has origins in historical legal and philosophical traditions.

== Pre United Nations Charter ==
=== Just War Tradition to Law of Nations ===
The legal scholarship on the use of force underwent a change, moving from the medieval just war tradition to the early modern Law of Nations (LN) and eventually the modern international law of the 20th century. While 19th-century international law conceded states the right to resort to force and war, this right was conditional and restricted. Force and war were simultaneously considered violations of states' inherent rights, such as their existence, self-preservation, internal sovereignty, external independence, equality, and dignity. Consequently, the use of force against a state was generally deemed a violation of one or more of these fundamental rights. Resort to force was typically considered permissible only after peaceful means of dispute settlement had failed or been refused.

=== Perpetual Peace Projects (PPP) ===
Emerging in the late 16th century alongside the Law of Nations, these projects offered a contrasting philosophical approach. While the LN tradition primarily aimed to regulate interstate wars, the PPP's main goal was to abolish them. Proponents of perpetual peace, including thinkers like the Abbé de Saint-Pierre, Jean-Jacques Rousseau, and Immanuel Kant, advocated for international arbitration as the means for settling interstate disputes, envisioning an International Union that would either possess coercive power (strong variant) or function as a purely arbitral tribunal (weak variant). This tradition emphasized the link between "perpetual" and "peace" as a means to prevent war and establish a European society based on justice and freedom.

=== Pre-Charter Attempts at Restriction ===
The Hague Peace Conferences of 1899 and 1907 marked the first serious interstate diplomatic attempts to restrict the recourse to war, aiming for the peaceful adjustment of international differences. During this period, the unlawfulness of ultimata and "measures short of war" gained increasing currency. The 19th-century principle of non-intervention was predominantly understood to interdict armed force, including the threat of force, though the law on this matter was not entirely settled.

== The UN Charter Era (1945 onwards) ==
The adoption of the UN Charter in 1945 was a milestone in the regulation of force, establishing a nearly fully-fledged ban on the use of force in international relations.

=== Drafters' Intent and Scope ===
The Allied Powers, motivated by the shortcomings of the Kellogg-Briand Pact and the devastations of World War II, aimed to bolster the prohibition of warfare by adopting more stringent provisions. Their intent was to declare the independent use of armed force by any UN member clearly unlawful, except in cases of self-defence against aggression. Discussions during the San Francisco Conference came from a desire for an "absolute all-inclusive prohibition" with "no loopholes" for unilateral armed actions. Proposals to expand the prohibition to economic, moral, physical, or political force were rejected, solidifying its focus on military force. The duty to refrain from threatening force was intrinsically linked to the duty, enshrined in Article 2(4), to seek settlement of disputes only through peaceful means. The Charter's strict ban was designed to include actions previously known as "measures short of war".

Article 2(4) expressly forbids "the threat or use of force." The International Court of Justice (ICJ) affirmed in its 1996 Nuclear Weapons Advisory Opinion that the threat of the use of force is just as unlawful as the actual use of force. This symmetrical prohibition generally means that if a particular use of force would be illegal, a threat to employ that force would also be illegal.

=== Philosophical Debate: Symmetry vs. Asymmetry ===
The prevailing view among most states and supported by the ICJ is that the prohibition of the threat of force operates symmetrically with the prohibition of the use of force. Legal texts systematically prohibit both in the same manner and to the same extent, without separate criteria for lawfulness.

A minority of scholars, notably Romana Sadurska in 1988, argued for a significant legal difference, suggesting that a threat of force is a "lesser international wrong" compared to actual use. This perspective posited that an "effective threat" could be an "economical guarantee against open violence" (e.g., nuclear deterrence), and threats made for certain law enforcement purposes might not be unlawful. However, this view has been widely critiqued for running counter to the drafters' intent for deterrence to be primarily channeled through the Security Council, and it has not been broadly accepted in state practice.

=== Evolution of Interpretation and Status ===
Various resolutions have clarified and elaborated upon the prohibition of the use of force, serving as authoritative interpretations of the UN Charter and contributing to customary international law. The 1970 Declaration on Friendly Relations and the 1974 Definition of Aggression are particularly notable in this regard, with small and newly independent states consistently supporting their drafting and reaffirmation.

Under the Charter, self-defence (Article 51) remains the sole classical legal justification for the use of force. However, the notion of "preventive self-defence"—exercising force or threatening it prior to an armed attack—is largely a minority view in international law, with the authority to permit force in response to a mere threat resting primarily with the Security Council.

The prohibition of force traditionally applies to inter-state relations, safeguarding state sovereignty, territorial integrity, and political independence. While post-9/11 "war on terror" rhetoric has introduced debates about the applicability of self-defence against non-state terrorist groups, the international community largely maintains the inter-state character of Article 2(4). Military actions taken to protect nationals are generally justified by linking them to existing legal grounds like state consent or self-defence, rather than establishing a new, standalone right. Proposals to create a new legal basis for military intervention solely for the rescue of nationals have been rejected by states.

Despite arguments for a right of humanitarian intervention, many publicists contend that no such exception exists in international law, and state practice offers limited support for it outside the Security Council framework. The emergence of the Responsibility to Protect (R2P) concept in the 2000s, while focusing on protecting populations from mass atrocities, has been interpreted as strengthening, rather than relaxing, the prohibition of the use of force, emphasizing collective action under Security Council authority. However, some interpretations of Security Council resolutions, propose force to halt such atrocites as widespread sexual violence, .

=== Jus Cogens Status ===
The prohibition of the use of force as a whole is widely recognized as a peremptory norm (jus cogens) of international law, meaning it cannot be derogated from by states. The International Law Commission (ILC) and the ICJ have consistently affirmed this status. Some scholars argue that the full prohibition of the threat of force cannot be classified as jus cogens because a minority of states have asserted the legality of threats for certain "law enforcement purposes" (e.g., maintaining peace and security or repressing jus cogens violations), thus preventing acceptance by the international community of States as a whole without derogation.

== Defining a "Threat of Force" ==
The UN Charter itself does not explicitly define "threat of force", and its travaux préparatoires are not particularly helpful. However, scholarly and judicial interpretations have provided parameters:

A "threat of force" is generally understood as an explicit or implied promise of a future and unlawful use of armed force against another state, the realization of which depends on the threatener's will. It requires a hostile intention (animus minandi) to exert abusive pressure on the victim state, distinguishing it from mere preparations for aggression or lawful acts. Scholars like Ian Brownlie and Romana Sadurska have offered definitions emphasizing its conditional nature on non-acceptance of demands and its intent to create apprehension.

For a threat to be covered by Article 2(4), it must be clearly established and directed against a specific state in a specific situation, not a vague general threat or broad political doctrines (even if bellicose). Demonstrations of force (such as military maneuvers, naval deployments, or weapon acquisition) can constitute a violation of Article 2(4) if they reveal a hostile intent to coerce. Some theoretical approaches define threats by their strategic utility, as a state might threaten force conditional on non-compliance with specific demands (known as "coercive diplomacy" or "blackmail"). This implies that a threat can be conveyed verbally or through force demonstrations, and there is no conceptual difference between threatening an initial use of force and threatening further, intensified violence.

The ICJ takes a contextual approach to assessing whether a signaled intention to use force constitutes a "threat".

== See also ==
- Coercion
