= Italy–Korea Treaty of 1884 =

1884 treaty between Italy and Korea

The Italy–Korea Treaty of 1884 was negotiated between representatives of Italy and Korea.

== Background ==
In 1876, Korea established a trade treaty with Japan after Japanese ships approached Ganghwado and threatened to fire on the Korean capital city. Treaty negotiations with several Western countries were made possible by the completion of this initial Japanese overture.

In 1882, the Americans concluded a treaty and established diplomatic relations, which served as a template for subsequent negotiations with other Western powers.

== Treaty provisions ==
The Italians and Koreans negotiated and approved a multi-article treaty with provisions similar to other Western nations.

Ministers from Italy to Korea could have been appointed in accordance with this treaty; but these duties were performed by consuls general at Shanghai, China.

The treaty remained in effect even after the protectorate was established in 1905.

== See also ==
- Unequal treaties
- List of Ambassadors from Italy to South Korea
