= Chinese concession of Incheon =

Qing concession in Joseon Korea (1884–1895)

The Chinese concession (yellow) in 1898

The Chinese concession of Incheon was one of the concessions of the Qing dynasty of China in Joseon Korea. It lasted from 1884 to 1895 in Incheon, which is now a city in South Korea. Although the concession was formally abolished in 1898 after China's defeat in the First Sino-Japanese War, it developed into today's Incheon Chinatown.

== History ==
In 1882, the Imo Incident occurred in Joseon dynasty Korea, and Qing China, which regarded Korea as its tributary state, sent troops to suppress it. China and Korea signed the China–Korea Treaty of 1882 in October 1882, stipulating that Korea was a dependency of China and granting Chinese merchants the right to conduct overland and maritime business freely within Korean borders as well as Chinese unilateral extraterritoriality privileges in civil and criminal cases. In 1884, China and Korea signed the "Incheon Chinese Merchant Concession Charter". The charter included 11 clauses and 3 additional clauses, stipulating that Qing China acquired 1.8 hectares of concession land and 0.7 hectares of commercial land in Incheon. Korea would bear the construction costs of streets, sewers, bridges, houses, and dock facilities in the Chinese concession. At the same time, it would also provide residential facilities. Detailed provisions were made on the classification of land and commercial land, land price collection, annual tax, Chinese merchant burial land, and cultivated land.

After China and Korea signed the "Incheon Chinese Merchant Concession Charter", Japan also made the same request to Korea and obtained a concession in Incheon. Countries such as the United Kingdom, France, Russia, Germany and other countries had obtained common concessions and commercial land, and established the Municipal Council as the governing body of the concessions. In 1885, Japan and China signed the Convention of Tientsin and withdrew their soldiers from Korea, pledging to inform one another before deploying troops into the nation in the future. China became the dominating power in Korea. Qing China subsequently signed the "Busan Chinese Merchant Concession Charter" and the "Wonsan Chinese Merchant Concession Charter" with Korea and obtained concessions in Busan and Wonsan. Chinese businessmen living in the concession (mostly from Shandong) established the Incheon Gentlemen and Merchants Association in Incheon and established Jining School. Qing China sent consuls and commercial commissioners for management, and the municipal facilities in the Chinese concession were entrusted to the common concessions of various countries managed by the Ministry of Industry.

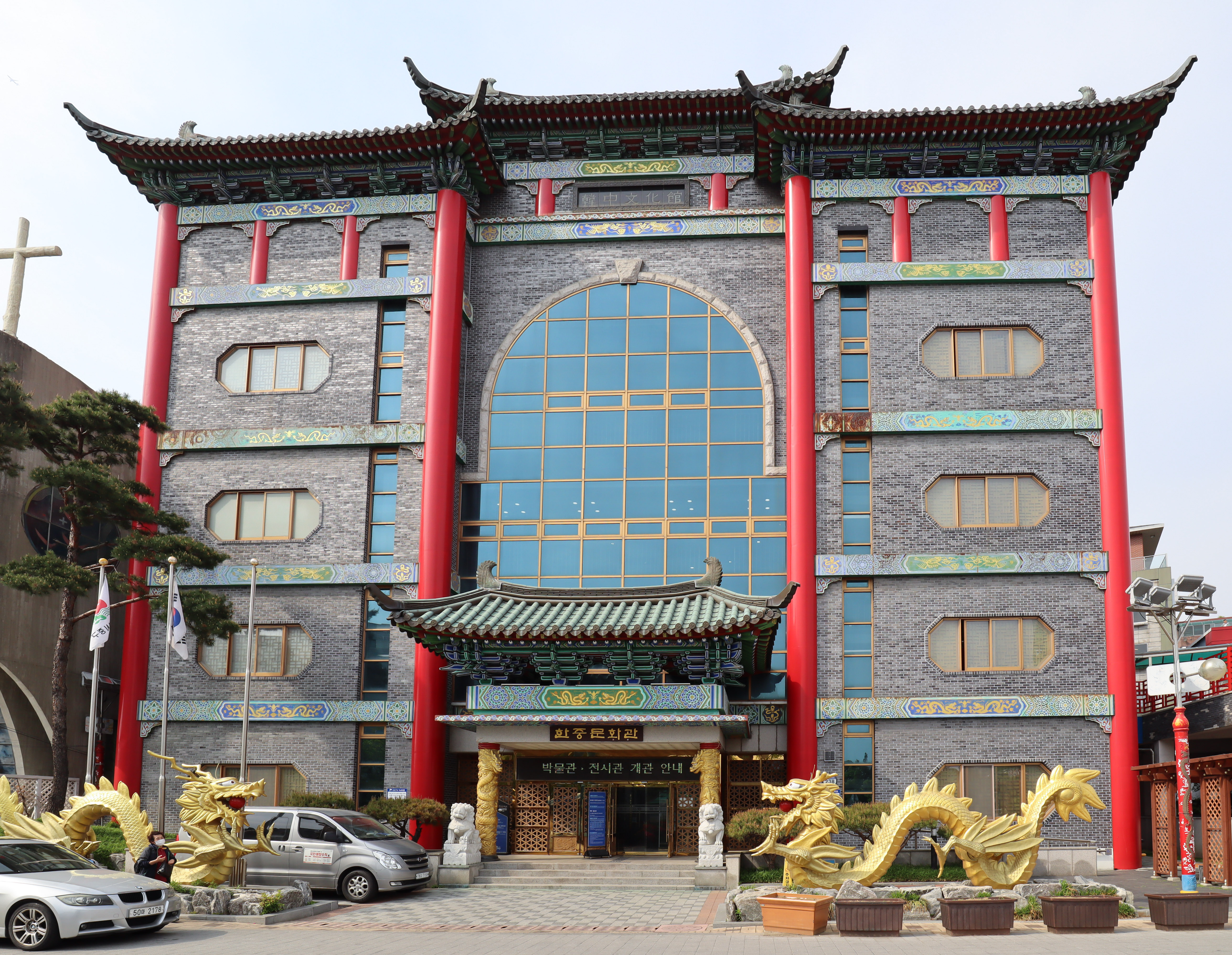
The Korea–China Cultural Center in Incheon (2023)

After the First Sino-Japanese War broke out in 1894, the Chinese concessions in Korea were occupied by the army of the Empire of Japan. The resulting Sino-Japanese Treaty of Shimonoseki stipulated that Korea was an "independent and autonomous country", and China lost its influence in Korea with its defeat in the war. The Korean government declared that all previous treaties between China and Korea were null and void, and took back all the concessions and diplomacy and tariff privileges of Qing China in Korea. The Korean government promulgated the "Rules for the Protection of Qing Merchants" on December 16, 1895, which stipulated the residence of Chinese merchants outside the original Chinese concession, the jurisdiction of Korea, and the business scope and codes of Chinese businessmen.

In February 1896, Kim Yun-sik, Minister of External Affairs of the Korean government, drafted a diplomatic treaty with Qing China. The newly-established Korean Empire signed the "China-Korea Trade Treaty" with China in September 1898, which completely abolished the Chinese merchant residence, but allowed Chinese merchants to still live in the former Incheon Chinese Concession and the Chinese merchants' residence area. The two places later developed into Incheon Chinatown, which still exists today as the only official Chinatown on the Korean Peninsula.

== See also ==
- Concessions and leases in international relations
- Foreign concessions in China
- Tributary system of China
- Chinese expansionism
- Incheon Chinatown
