= Korea–United Kingdom Treaty of 1883 =

1883 treaty between the United Kingdom and Korea

The United Kingdom–Korea Treaty of 1883 was negotiated between representatives of the United Kingdom and Korea.

== Background ==
In 1876, Korea established a trade treaty with Japan after Japanese ships approached Ganghwado and threatened to fire on the Korean capital city. Treaty negotiations with several Western countries were made possible by the completion of this initial Japanese overture.

In 1882, the Americans concluded a treaty and established diplomatic relations, which served as a template for subsequent negotiations with other Western powers.

== Treaty provisions ==
The British and Koreans negotiated and approved a multi-article treaty with provisions similar to other Western nations.

Ministers from the United Kingdom to Korea were appointed in accordance with this treaty; and these diplomats were: Sir Harry Parkes, appointed in 1884; Sir John Walsham, appointed in 1885; Sir Nicholas O'Conor, in 1892; Sir Claude Maxwell, in 1896; John Jordan in 1898.

The treaty remained in effect even after the Japanese protectorate was established in 1905, and only came to an end in 1910 when Japan annexed Korea.

Under the treaty, the United Kingdom obtained extraterritorial rights in Korea and from 1883 to 1910, British subjects in Korea were not subject to the jurisdiction of Korean courts, but instead were tried or had civil cases brought against them in British consular courts or the British Supreme Court for China and Japan which was called the Supreme Court for China and Korea between 1900 and 1910.

== See also ==
- List of ambassadors of the United Kingdom to North Korea
- List of ambassadors of the United Kingdom to South Korea

== References and further reading ==
- Han, Seunghoon. "The Endeavour to Revise Unequal Treaties in East Asia in the Early 1880s." International Journal of Korean History 23.1 (2018): 87–115. online
- Kim, Chun-gil. (2005). The History of Korea. Westport, Connecticut: Greenwood Press. ISBN 9780313332968; ISBN 9780313038532; OCLC 217866287
- Korean Mission to the Conference on the Limitation of Armament, Washington, D.C., 1921–1922. (1922). Korea's Appeal to the Conference on Limitation of Armament. Washington: U.S. Government Printing Office. OCLC 12923609
- Yŏng-ho Ch'oe; William Theodore De Bary; Martina Deuchler and Peter Hacksoo Lee. (2000). Sources of Korean Tradition: From the Sixteenth to the Twentieth Centuries. New York: Columbia University Press. ISBN 9780231120302; ISBN 9780231120319; OCLC 248562016
