= Taft–Katsura agreement =

1905 Discussion between leaders of the United States and the Empire of Japan

The Taft–Katsura Agreement (桂・タフト協定, Katsura–Tafuto Kyōtei), also known as the Taft–Katsura Memorandum, was a 1905 discussion between senior leaders of Japan and the United States regarding the positions of the two nations in greater East Asian affairs, especially regarding the status of Korea and the Philippines in the aftermath of Japan's victory during the Russo-Japanese War. The memorandum was not classified as a secret, but no scholar noticed it in the archives until 1924.

The discussions were between William Howard Taft, then the United States Secretary of War and Prince Katsura Tarō, the Japanese Prime Minister, on 27 July 1905. Katsura stated Japan's reasons for its making a protectorate of Korea and repeated that Japan had no interest in the Philippines, which the U.S. had acquired after the defeat of Spain during the 1898 Spanish–American War.

In 1924, Tyler Dennett was the first scholar to see the document and described it as containing "the text of perhaps the most remarkable 'executive agreement' in the history of the foreign relations of the United States." The consensus of historians is that Dennett greatly exaggerated the importance of a routine discussion which changed nothing and set no new policies. Historians pointed out there was no formal agreement on anything new. The word "agreement" in the documents meant merely the two sides agreed that both the English and Japanese versions of the notes of the meeting accurately covered the substance of the conversations. President Theodore Roosevelt later agreed that Taft had correctly stated the American position.

When Dennett first discovered the notes, he assumed they indicated a highly-significant "secret pact" between the U.S. and Japan in creating the basis of an agreement whereby the two formerly-isolationist nations became world powers. The conversations were regarding the extent of the spheres of influence of Japan and the United States and maintaining peace between them in the event of victory of Japan over Russia in the Russo-Japanese War.

== Background ==
The Taft–Katsura Agreement was forged as part of a long term project to demarcate zones of control in the Pacific region between the United States and Japan, essentially partitioning the Western Pacific Rim between the two powers. Since the 1870s, the United States had been secretly urging Japan to create a Japanese "sphere of influence" modeled on the Monroe Doctrine that the U.S. had declared for the exclusion of other powers from the Western Hemisphere. Japan began invading Taiwan in 1874 and fought the Russian Empire for control of Manchuria starting in 1904.

Continuing this American policy, U.S. President Theodore Roosevelt also secretly reiterated to Japan that, just as the U.S. under the Monroe Doctrine and its Roosevelt Corollary declared the Western Hemisphere as part its sphere of influence, Japan should create its own sphere of influence in the Pacific Rim. Roosevelt was encouraged by Japan embarking on Western ways and developing a modern military in the wake of the forced "Opening of Japan" by the United States that had begun with the Perry Expedition. Roosevelt told the Japanese that they are more racially similar to Americans than Russians are, even though Russians are a White race, and that Japan should take its place among the great Western powers to dominate, among other areas, Korea and Manchuria, but that Japan must not encroach on U.S. possession of the Philippines. In much the same way that Europeans used the "backwardness" of African and Asian nations as a reason for why they had to conquer them, for the Japanese elite the "backwardness" of China and Korea was proof of the inferiority of those nations, thus giving the Japanese the "right" to conquer them.

== Main features of the Agreement ==
The Taft–Katsura Agreement consists of the English and Japanese versions of the meeting notes of the secret conversation between Japanese Prime Minister Katsura and U.S. Secretary of War Taft held in Tokyo on the morning of 27 July 1905. The memorandum detailing these discussions was dated 29 July 1905.

Three significant issues were discussed during the meeting:

- Katsura's views on peace in East Asia formed, according to him, the fundamental principle of Japan's foreign policy and were best accomplished by a good understanding among Japan, the United States, and Great Britain.
- On the Philippines, Taft observed that it was in Japan's best interests to have the Philippines governed by a strong and friendly nation like the United States. Katsura claimed that Japan had no aggressive designs on the Philippines.
- Regarding Korea, Katsura observed that Japanese colonization of Korea was a matter of absolute importance, as he considered Korea to have been a direct cause of the recently concluded Russo-Japanese War. Katsura stated that a comprehensive solution of the Korean problem would be the war's logical outcome. Katsura further stated that if left alone, Korea would continue to join improvident agreements and treaties with other powers, which he said to have created the original problem. Therefore, he stated that Japan must take steps to prevent Korea from again creating conditions that would force Japan into fighting another foreign war.

Taft concurred that the establishment of a Japanese protectorate over Korea would directly contribute to stability in East Asia. Taft also expressed his belief that Roosevelt would concur in his views in this regard.

There were three substantive areas of understanding in the conversation. Firstly, Taft said to Katsura that some supporters of Russia in America were publicly claiming that the recent war was a prelude to certain aggression by Japan against the Philippines. Taft stated that Japan's only interest in the Philippines would be to have the islands governed by a strong and friendly nation like the United States. Katsura strongly confirmed that was Japan's only interest in the Philippines and, since that was already the case, Japan had no aggressive interest toward the Philippines. Secondly, Katsura stated that Japan's policy in East and Southeast Asia was to maintain general peace, which should be achieved by a good understanding between Japan, the United States, and Great Britain.

Thirdly, Katsura stated that because Korean autonomy had resulted in Korea improvidently entering into agreements and treaties with other powers, which had been the cause of international complications leading to the war between Japan and Russia. Japan, therefore, felt constrained to preclude any possibility of Korean autonomy. Taft stated that the establishment of a suzerainty of Japan over Korea (the less powerful Korea paying tribute to or being somewhat controlled by the more powerful Japan), with Japanese military troops enforcing a requirement for Korea to enter into no foreign treaties without the consent of Japan, was a logical result of the war and would contribute to permanent peace in the East. Taft also stated that his opinions were his own, but that he believed that Roosevelt would concur.

== Katsura's announcement for Western audiences ==
In an interview with the New York Times days later, Katsura explained that Japan's "policy in the Far East will be in exact accord with that of England and the United States." Japan will soon force "upon Korea and China the same benefits of modern development that have been in the past forced on us.... We intend to begin a campaign of education in [Korea and China] such as we ourselves have experienced [and to develop] Asiatic commercial interests that will benefit us all. China and Korea are both atrociously mis-governed...These conditions we will endeavor to correct at the earliest possible date--by persuasion and education, if possible; by force, if necessary. And in this, as in all things, we expect to act in exact concurrence with the ideas and desires of England and the United States."

== Discovery by historians ==
Although there was never a signed agreement or secret treaty, only a memorandum of a conversation, and the conversations were kept secret for 20 years, Roosevelt commented to Taft, "Your conversation with Count Katsura (sic) absolutely correct in every respect. Wish (sic) that you would state to Katsura that I confirm every word you said."

However, there is controversy among historians as to the historic significance of the conversation and as to whether the language of the conversation constituted an actual agreement in Realpolitik (an actual agreement was implied by the use of the language of diplomacy although it was not made explicit as a formal agreement).

The notes of the conversation were discovered in 1924 by the historian Tyler Dennett, who considered the notes to be of first-rate significance and asked permission for publication from Secretary of State Charles Evans Hughes. Dennett referred to the notes as "President Roosevelt's Secret Pact With Japan."

== Korean interpretation ==
Korean historians (such as Ki-baik Lee, author of A New History of Korea, Harvard U. Press, 1984) believe that the Taft–Katsura Agreement violated the Korean–American Treaty of Amity and Commerce signed at Incheon on 22 May 1882, because the Joseon government considered that treaty constituted a de facto mutual defense treaty, unlike the Americans. The problem was Article 1: "There shall be perpetual peace and friendship between the President of the United States and the King of Chosen and the citizens and subjects of their respective Governments. If other powers deal unjustly or oppressively with either Government, the other will exert their good offices on being informed of the case to bring about an amicable arrangement, thus showing their friendly feelings."

The agreement has been cited in contemporary South Korea by some as an example that the United States cannot be relied upon with regards to issues of South Korean security and sovereignty.

== See also ==
- Root–Takahira Agreement
- Japan–United States relations
- Japan–Korea Treaty of 1905
- Hague Secret Emissary Affair

== Bibliography ==
- Raymond A. Esthus (Mar 1959). "The Taft–Katsura Agreement: Reality or Myth?". Journal of Modern History. 31 (1): 46–51. doi:10.1086/238298. JSTOR 1871772. S2CID 143613542.
- Kirk W. Larsen, and Joseph Seeley. "Simple conversation or secret treaty? The Taft–Katsura Memorandum in Korean historical memory." Journal of Korean Studies (2014): 59–92. online
- Ralph Eldin Minger. "Taft's Missions to Japan: A Study in Personal Diplomacy." Pacific Historical Review (1961) 30#3: 279–294. online
- Seung-young Kim. American Diplomacy and Strategy toward Korea and Northeast Asia, 1882–1950 and After: Perception of Polarity and US Commitment to a Periphery (Springer, 2009).
- Richard Storry (1979). Japan and the Decline of the West in Asia, 1894–1943. New York City: St. Martins' Press. ISBN 978-033306868-7.
