= Japan–Korea Agreement of August 1904 =

1904 treaty between Japan and Korea

- Hangul: 제1차 한일협약
- Hanja: 第一次韓日協約
- Revised Romanization: Je-il-cha Han-il Hyeop-yak
- McCune–Reischauer: Che-il-ch'a Han-il Hyŏp-yak

The Japan–Korea Protocol of August 1904 was made between representatives of the Empire of Japan and the Korean Empire in 1904. Negotiations were concluded on August 22, 1904.

== Treaty provisions ==
This treaty required Korea to engage financial and diplomatic advisers designated by Japan. Also, the treaty required Korea to consult with Japan before making treaties with foreign powers, and before granting concessions or making contracts with foreigners.

The treaty presumes that the Envoy Extraordinary and Minister Plenipotentiary of His Majesty the Emperor of Japan and the Minister of State for Foreign Affairs ad interim of His Majesty the Emperor of Korea were respectively authorized and empowered to negotiate and to agree upon the specific language of the proposed bilateral treaty:

- Article I.

The Korean Government shall engage as financial adviser to the Korean Government a Japanese subject recommended by the Japanese Government, and all matters concerning finance shall be dealt with after his counsel has been taken.

- Article II.

The Korean Government shall engage as a diplomatic adviser to the Department of Foreign Affairs a foreigner recommended by the Japanese Government, and all important matters concerning foreign relations shall be dealt with after his counsel has been taken.

- Article III.

The Korean Government shall consult the Japanese Government previous to concluding Treaties or Conventions with foreign Powers, and in dealing with other important diplomatic affairs such as granting of concessions to or contracts with foreigners.

— Hayashi Gonsuke, Envoy Extraordinary and Minister Plenipotentiary (dated: the 22nd day of the 8th month of the 37th year of Meiji)
— Yun Chi-ho, Acting Minister of State for Foreign Affairs (dated: the 22nd day of the 8th month of the 8th year of Gwangmu)

An amplified explanation of the scope and purpose of Article III was mentioned in a 1904 letter from the Japanese Ambassador to the United States Takahira Kogorō to the American Secretary of State John Hay:

"Article III is not intended to place an impediment in the way of the legitimate enterprise of foreigners in the sphere of commerce and industry, but is calculated to serve as a precaution against the conclusion of improvident and dangerous engagements which have often in the past proved a source of serious complications, as was conspicuously shown in the case of the Russian lease of Yongampho."

== Recision ==
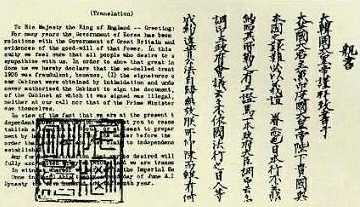
Gojong's analysis of the "treaty of 1905" – just one of many efforts to invalidate the consequences of a coercive process.

This "alleged treaty" was contrived in a coercive process; and Koreans sought to invalidate the unwanted consequences by presenting evidence to the international community. For example,

- 1905: Emperor Gojong of the Korean Empire wrote personally to the heads of state in those countries having treaties with Korea; and the Korean government filed formal appeals and sent formal cable notices, but these diplomatic gestures were unavailing.
- 1907: In what is sometimes called the "Hague Secret Emissary Affair," Korean emissaries sought unsuccessfully to seek international assistance at the Hague Convention of 1907 at The Hague, Netherlands in 1907.
- 1921: Korean representatives attempted to gain a hearing at the Washington Naval Conference of 1921; but the effort was ineffective.

This treaty was confirmed to be "already null and void" by Treaty on Basic Relations between Japan and the Republic of Korea concluded in 1965. In 2010, Japan argued that the chronological point of reference for "already null and void" was August 15, 1948, when the government of the Republic of Korea was established. This point of view is disputed by the Korean analysis, which construes the 1965 treaty as acknowledgment of the nullification of all Japanese-Korean treaties and agreements from 1904 onwards.

== See also ==
- Unequal treaty
- Japan–Korea Treaty of February 1904
- Japan–Korea Agreement of April 1905
- Japan–Korea Agreement of August 1905
- Japan–Korea Treaty of 1905
- Japan–Korea Treaty of 1907
