= Japan–Korea Treaty of February 1904 =

1904 treaty between Japan and Korea

- Hangul: 한일의정서
- Hanja: 韓日議定書
- RR: Hanil uijeongseo
- MR: Hanil ŭijŏngsŏ

The Japan–Korea Treaty of 1904 was made between representatives of the Empire of Japan and the Korean Empire in 1904. Negotiations were concluded on 23 February 1904. Though Korea declared neutral to Russo-Japanese War, Japanese troops entered Seoul on 9 February 1904, declared war on Russia, and kidnapped some pro-Russians in Korea, including Lee Yong-ik (이용익). The treaty was confirmed invalid in 1965 by Treaty on Basic Relations between Japan and the Republic of Korea.

== Treaty provisions ==
The treaty preamble asserted that the Envoy Extraordinary and Minister Plenipotentiary of His Majesty the Emperor of Japan and the Minister of State for Foreign Affairs ad interim of His Majesty the Emperor of Korea were "respectively duly empowered" to negotiate and to agree upon the specific language of the proposed bilateral treaty:

- Article I.

For the purpose of maintaining a permanent and solid friendship between Japan and Korea and firmly establishing peace in the Far East, the Imperial Government of Korea shall place full confidence in the Imperial Government of Japan, and adopt the advice of the latter in regard to improvements in administration.

- Article II.

The Imperial Government of Japan shall in a spirit of firm friendship ensure the safety and repose of the Imperial House of Korea.

- Article III.

The Imperial Government of Japan definitively guarantee the independence and territorial integrity of the Korean Empire.

- Article IV.

In case the welfare of the Imperial House of Korea or the territorial integrity of Korea is endangered by aggression of a third power or internal disturbances, the Imperial Government of Japan shall immediately take such necessary measures as circumstances require, and in such case the Imperial Government of Korea shall give full facilities to promote the action of the Imperial Japanese Government. The Imperial Government of Japan may for the attainment of the above-mentioned object occupy when the circumstances require such places as may be necessary from strategic points of view.

- Article V.

The Governments of the two countries shall not in future without mutual consent conclude with a third power such an arrangement as may be contrary to the principles of the present protocol.

Article VI.

Details in connection with the present protocol shall be arranged as the circumstances may require between the Minister of Foreign Affairs of Korea and the representative of the Empire of Japan.

— Hayashi Gonsuke, Envoy Extraordinary and Minister Plenipotentiary (dated, the 23rd day of the 2nd month of the 38th year of Meiji)
— Yi Ji-yong, Minister of Foreign Affairs ad interim (dated, the 23rd day of the 2nd month of the 8th year of Kwangmu)

== Aftermath ==
After the treaty was signed, Japan attempted to isolate and even kidnap anti-Japanese politicians such as Yi Yong-ik, Gil Young-su, Yi Hak-gyun, and Hyun Sang-geon. Their posts were replaced by pro-Japanese officials of Korea.

== Recision ==
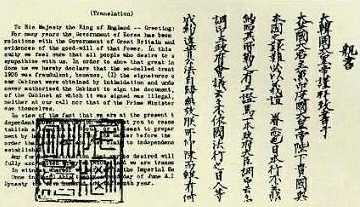
Gojong's analysis of the "treaty of 1905" – just one of many efforts to invalidate the consequences of a coercive process.

This "alleged treaty" was contrived in a coercive process; and Koreans sought to invalidate the unwanted consequences by presenting evidence to the international community. For example,

- 1905: Emperor Gojong of the Korean Empire wrote personally to the heads of state in those countries having treaties with Korea; and the Korean government filed formal appeals and sent formal cable notices, but these diplomatic gestures were unavailing.
- 1907: In what is sometimes called the "Hague Secret Emissary Affair," Korean emissaries sought unsuccessfully to seek international assistance at the Hague Convention of 1907 at The Hague, Netherlands.
- 1921: Korean representatives attempted to gain a hearing at the Washington Naval Conference of 1921; but the effort was ineffective.

This treaty was confirmed to be "already null and void" by Treaty on Basic Relations between Japan and the Republic of Korea concluded in 1965. In 2010, Japan argued that the chronological point of reference for "already null and void" was August 15, 1948, when the government of the Republic of Korea was established. This point of view is disputed by the Korean analysis, which construes the 1965 treaty as acknowledgment of the nullification of all Japanese-Korean treaties and agreements from 1904 onwards.

== See also ==
- Japan–Korea Agreement of August 1904
- Japan–Korea Agreement of April 1905
- Japan–Korea Agreement of August 1905
- Japan–Korea Treaty of 1905
- Anglo-Japanese Alliance
- Taft–Katsura Agreement
- Treaty of Portsmouth
- Root–Takahira Agreement
- Unequal treaty
