= Japan–Korea Treaty of 1882 =

1882 treaty between Japan and Korea

The Japan–Korea Treaty of 1882, also known as the Treaty of Chemulpo or the Chemulpo Convention, was negotiated between Japan and Korea following the Imo Incident in July 1882.

== Background ==
On July 23, 1882, factional strife between Koreans in Korea's capital expanded beyond the initial causes of the disturbance.

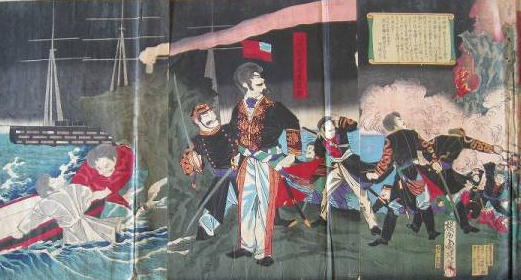
"The Korean Uprising of 1882" — woodblock print by Toyohara Chikanobu, 1882

As the violence unfolded, the Japanese legation was destroyed by rioters. The Japanese diplomats were forced to flee the country. When order was restored, the Japanese government demanded damages and other concessions form the Korean government.

The negotiations were concluded in August 1882.

Article V of the "convention" permitted the Japanese to protect the Japanese legation and the Japanese community in Korea.

In 1884, the Japanese forgave the ¥400,000 indemnity which had been mandated by the treaty.

== See also ==
- Unequal treaties
