= Japan–Korea Treaty of 1885 =

1885 treaty between Japan and Korea

The Japan–Korea Treaty of 1885, also known as the Treaty of Hanseong (Japanese: 漢城条約, Hepburn: Kanjō Jōyaku) with Hanseong (Korean: 한성; Hanja: 漢城) being a historical name for Seoul, was negotiated between Japan and Korea following an unsuccessful coup d'état in the Korean capital in December 1884.

== Background ==
A coup d'état, also known as the Gapsin Coup, was attempted on December 4, 1884. The timing of the coup took advantage of the fact that the Chinese withdrew half of its garrison troops from Seoul.

After only three days, the revolt was suppressed by Chinese military forces which were garrisoned in the Korean capital city of Hanseong (Seoul). During the conflict, the Japanese legation building was burned down, and forty Japanese were killed.

Inoue Kaoru was the chief Japanese diplomat in dealings with Korea. Diplomatic negotiations were concluded in January 1885.

== Treaty provisions ==
The Japanese government demanded and received an apology and reparations.

== Aftermath ==
In an effort to defuse tensions over Korea, both Japan and China agreed to withdraw their troops from Korea in the Convention of Tientsin of April 1885.

== See also ==
- Unequal treaties
