= Hayashi Gonsuke (diplomat) =

Japanese noble and diplomat (1860–1939)

Junior First Rank Baron Hayashi Gonsuke
- 林 権助
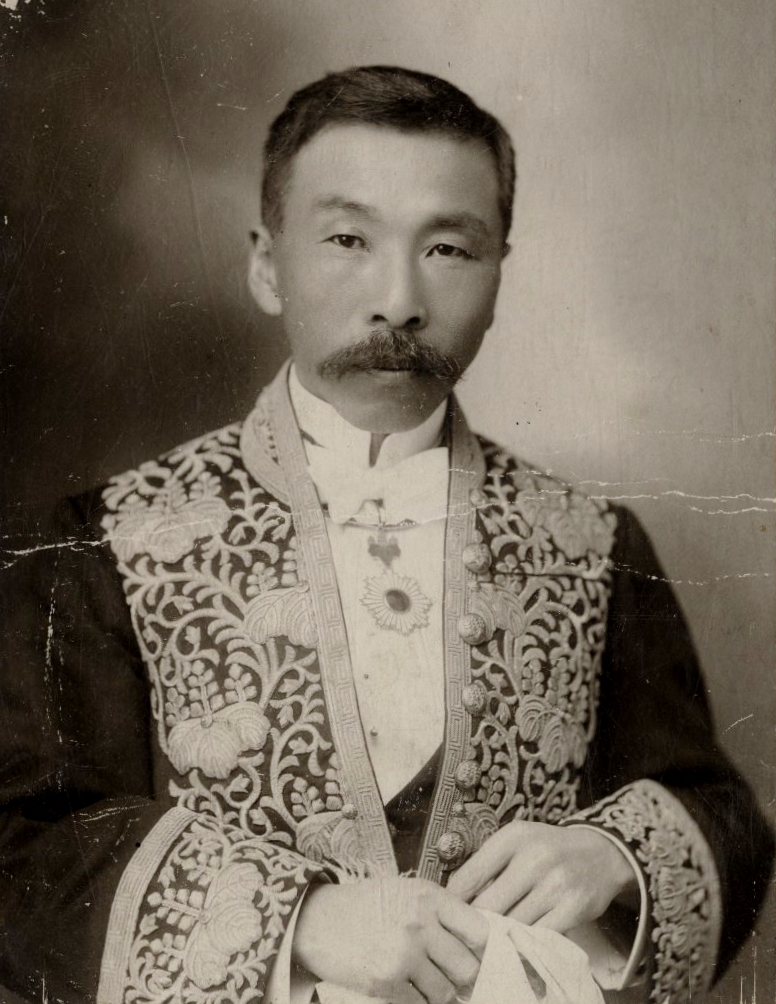

5th Governor-General of the Kwantung Leased Territory
- In office 12 April 1919 – 24 May 1920
- Monarch: Taishō
- Preceded by: Nakamura Yūjirō
- Succeeded by: Yamagata Isaburō

Member of the Privy Council
- In office 17 July 1934 – 27 June 1939
- Monarch: Hirohito

Personal details
- Born: 23 March 1860 Aizuwakamatsu, Mutsu, Japan
- Died: 27 June 1939 (aged 79) Minato, Tokyo, Japan
- Resting place: Aoyama Cemetery
- Relatives: Hayashi Yasusada (grandfather)
- Education: Tokyo Imperial University
- Occupation: Diplomat

Baron Hayashi Gonsuke (林 権助, Gonsuke Hayashi; 23 March 1860 – 27 June 1939) was a diplomat of the Empire of Japan.

== Biography ==
Hayashi was born in Aizu Domain (modern Fukushima Prefecture) on 23 March 1860. His grandfather, Hayashi Yasusada (also known as "Hayashi Gonsuke") was a noted samurai leader in the Boshin War of the Meiji Restoration, but fighting for the Tokugawa shogunate. In 1867, his grandfather and father were both killed in combat during the Battle of Toba–Fushimi, leaving the seven-year-old Gonsuke as head of the Hayashi household. Despite his youth, he was given a military rank and assigned to a position in the defense of Aizuwakamatsu Castle during the Battle of Aizu. After the defeat of the Aizu forces and the establishment of the Meiji government, Hayashi, along with many surviving members of the Aizu clan, were expelled to the newly created Tonami Domain in what is now northern Aomori Prefecture. However, after a period in northern Japan, he caught the attention of an officer from Satsuma Domain, Kodama Sanefumi, who had known his grandfather in Kyoto from the days of the Kōbu gattai movement, and Kodama brought the young Hayashi and his mother to live in Tokyo. Kodama subsequently died during the Satsuma Rebellion.

Hayashi graduated from Tokyo Imperial University and obtained a position at the Foreign Ministry in 1887. After serving as Consul to the Japanese diplomatic missions at Chemulpo, Korea and Shanghai, China, he served as secretary at the Japanese embassies in London and Beijing. While in China, he helped Liang Qichao escape to exile in Japan after the Conservative Coup ended the Hundred Days' Reform. Hayashi was highly regarded by Katō Takaaki, and was appointed Director of the Communications Bureau in the Foreign Ministry in 1899.

During the Russo-Japanese War, Hayashi served as Deputy Ambassador to the Kingdom of Korea, and in that capacity signed the Japan–Korea Treaty of February 1904 on 23 February 1904, which gave the Imperial Japanese Army freedom of action on the Korean Peninsula. This was followed by the Japan–Korea Agreement of August 1904 and the Japan–Korea Treaty of 1905 which resulted in Korea becoming a protectorate of the Empire of Japan. Hayashi was rewarded with elevation to the kazoku peerage of Japan, with the title of danshaku (baron). He served as resident minister of Japan to the Kingdom of Italy in 1908.

From 1916 to 1918, Hayashi served as Minister Plenipotentiary to China. From 1919 to 1920 Hayashi served as the first civilian governor of the Kwantung Leased Territory. In these roles, he opposed the activities of Nishihara Kamezo, a Japanese businessmen who facilitated the Nishihara Loans to the Chinese government. Hayashi's opposition proved controversial among many Japanese officials.

In 1920, he was reassigned to London, and in 1921 was part of the Japanese delegation to the League of Nations Assembly in Geneva, Switzerland. Hayashi served as Ambassador to the United Kingdom from 1920 to 1925, and in that capacity represented his country at the Genoa Conference in 1922. Historian Harumi Goto-Shibata described Hayashi as "remarkably independent-minded and individualistic" in his role as Ambassador to the United Kingdom. He attempted to preserve amicable Anglo-Japanese relations and argued that Japan should adopt a less heavy-handed policy toward China in order to improve these relations. These views contradicted the Japanese government's own goals, which included maintaining and even expanding their involvement in China.

Hayashi subsequently served as a member of the Privy Council from 1934 until his death in 1939. His grave is at the Aoyama Cemetery in Tokyo.

== See also ==
- List of Ambassadors from Japan to South Korea
