= Root–Takahira Agreement =

1908 United States–Japan agreement

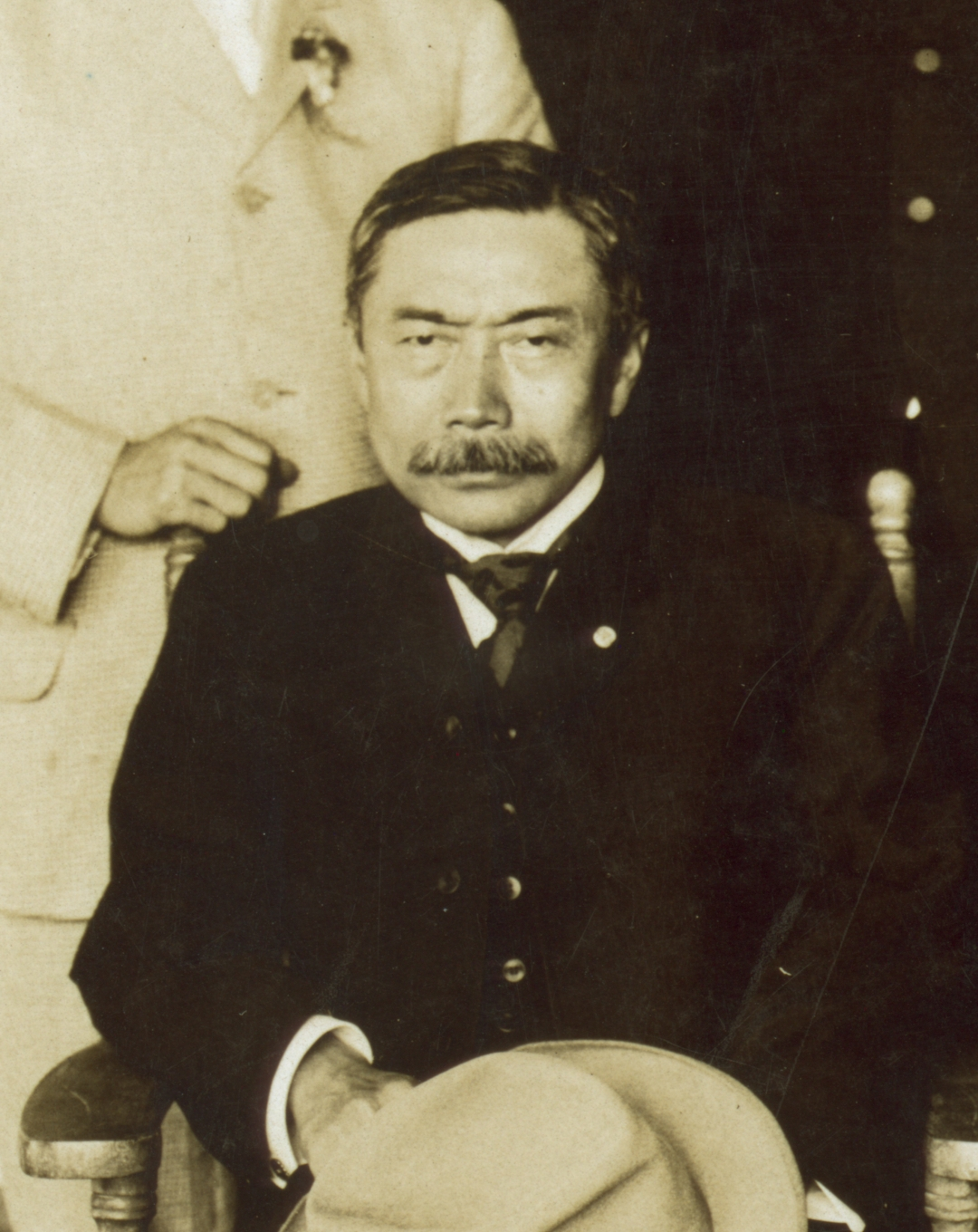
Takahira Kogoro (1854–1926), Japanese diplomat.

The Root–Takahira Agreement (高平・ルート協定, Takahira-Rūto Kyōtei) was a major 1908 agreement between the United States and the Empire of Japan that was negotiated between United States Secretary of State Elihu Root and Japanese Ambassador to the United States Takahira Kogorō. It was a statement of longstanding policies held by both nations, much like the Taft–Katsura Agreement of 1905. Both agreements acknowledged key overseas territories controlled by each nation. Neither agreement was a treaty and no Senate approval was needed.

Signed on November 30, 1908, the Root–Takahira Agreement consisted of an official recognition of the territorial status quo as of November 1908, the affirmation of the independence and territorial integrity of China (the "Open Door Policy" as proposed by John Hay), the maintenance of free trade and equal commercial opportunities, the Japanese recognition of the American annexation of the Republic of Hawaii and control the Philippines, and the American recognition of Japan's control over Korea and Manchuria, as well as the Japanese acquiescence to limitations on Japanese immigration to California.

With the defeat of Spain in the Spanish–American War, the United States had become a major power in East Asia. The Japanese government began to see the American annexation of Hawaii and China's aggressive economic policies as threats. The American government, on the other hand, was increasingly concerned by Japanese territorial ambitions at the expense of China and with the modernizing and strengthening Imperial Japanese Navy in the aftermath of the Russo-Japanese War. Strong Anti-Japanese sentiment in California angered Japan, but it was resolved by the Gentlemen's Agreement of 1907. The Great White Fleet of American battleships visited Japan in October 1908. President Theodore Roosevelt originally intended to emphasize the superiority of the American fleet over the smaller Japanese navy, but instead of resentment the visitors arrived to a joyous welcome by elite and the Japanese public a few days before Root and Takahira met. The agreement calmed tensions for a while. However, Japan's rapprochement to Russia after 1907 and its increasing economic investment into Manchuria made the agreement result in a weakened American influence and greater Japanese control over China.

== See also ==
- Nishi–Rosen Agreement
- Japan–Russia Secret Agreements
- Theodore Roosevelt administration
