= Joseon–United States Treaty of 1882 =

Korea–U.S. establishment of relations

Treaty of Peace, Amity, Commerce and Navigation between the United States of America and the Kingdom of Corea or Chosen
- Drafted: 1882
- Signed: 22 May 1882
- Location: Chemulpo, Korea
- Effective: 19 May 1883
- Expiration: 5 September 1905
- Signatories: Robert W. Shufeldt; Shin Heon; Kim Hong-jip
- Parties: Korea; United States
- Languages: English and Classical Chinese

A Treaty of Peace, Amity, Commerce and Navigation between the United States of America and the Kingdom of Corea or Chosen (Korean: 조·미수호통상조약; Hanja: 朝美修好通商條約), also known as the Shufeldt Treaty, was negotiated between United States and Korea’s Joseon dynasty in 1882.

The treaty's final draft was accepted at Chemulpo (present day Incheon) near the Korean capital of Hanseong (now Seoul) in April and May 1884. It was Korea's first treaty with a western nation. After the United States assented to the Taft–Katsura agreement, the intervention clause was effectively nullified.

== Background ==
In 1876, Korea established a trade treaty with Japan after Japanese ships approached Ganghwado and, following the Ganghwa Island incident, threatened to open fire on the Korean capital city. Treaty negotiations with the U.S. and with several European countries were made possible by the completion of this initial Japanese overture.

Negotiations with Qing were a significant feature of the process which resulted in this treaty. The Chinese played a significant role in the treaty negotiation, although Korea was an independent country at the time, which was explicitly mentioned in the treaty.

== Treaty provisions ==
The United States and Korea negotiated and approved a 14 article treaty. The treaty established mutual friendship and mutual diplomatic arbitration with unjust or oppressive foreign powers; and the treaty also addressed such specific matters as extraterritorial rights for U.S. citizens in Korea and most favored nation trade status.

=== Abstract ===
The treaty encompasses a range of subjects.

- Article 1 provides:

There shall be perpetual peace and friendship between the President of the United States and the King of Joseon and the citizens and subjects of their respective Governments. If other powers deal unjustly or oppressively with either Government, the other will exert their good offices on being informed of the case to bring about an amicable arrangement, thus showing their friendly feelings.

- Article 2 ... exchange of diplomatic and consular representatives
- Article 3 ... United States vessels wrecked on coast of Korea
- Article 4 ... United States extraterritorial jurisdiction over its citizens in Korea
- Article 5 ... merchants and merchant vessels shall reciprocally pay duties
- Article 6 ... reciprocal rights of residence and protection of citizens of both nations
- Article 7 ... prohibiting export or import of opium
- Article 8 ... export of "breadstuffs" and red ginseng
- Article 9 ... regulating importation of arms and ammunition
- Article 10 .. reciprocal rights to employing native labor
- Article 11 .. students exchanges
- Article 12 .. further negotiation of provisions after 5 years
- Article 13 .. use of Classical Chinese as official correspondence language
- Article 14 .. the usual most-favored-nation clause

The treaty remained in effect until the Treaty of Portsmouth in 1905.

== Aftermath ==
Joseon sent a diplomatic mission to the U.S. in 1883, marking the first ever such official visit to North America by Koreans. The U.S. treaty established a template which was explicitly modeled in treaties with European nations — Germany in 1883, Russia and Italy in 1884, France in 1886, and others as well.

The treaty remained in effect even until the U.S. recognized 'Article 2' in the Treaty of Portsmouth of 1905, which eventually cleared the way for Japan's takeover of Korea in 1910.

== See also ==
- United States expedition to Korea
- Korean Empire (1897)
- Taft–Katsura agreement (1905)
- Hague Secret Emissary Affair (1907)
- Japan–Korea Treaty of 1905
- Japan–Korea Treaty of 1910
