= Altteureu Airfield =

Former Japanese air base in South Korea

- 알뜨르 비행장
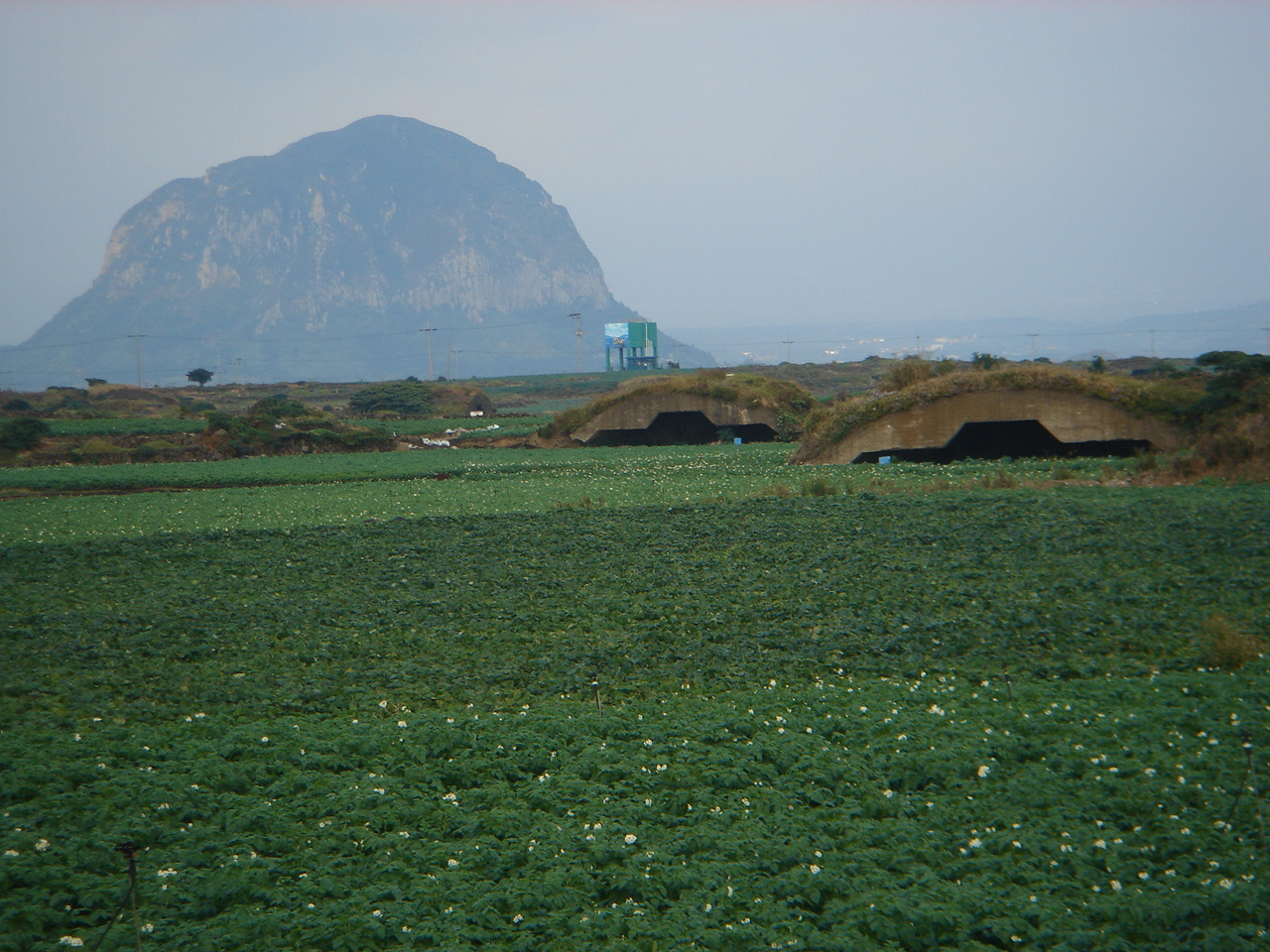
- Photo of the airfield taken in 2006

Site information
- Type: Military airfield
- Controlled by: Imperial Japanese Navy Air Service; United States Air Force; Republic of Korea Air Force
- Condition: abandoned/inactive

Location
- Coordinates: 33°12′16″N 126°16′18″E
- Height: 58 ft (18 m)

Site history
- Built: 1926–1930
- Built by: Imperial Japanese Navy Air Service
- In use: 1930–1963

Altteureu Airfield (Korean: 알뜨르 비행장), also known as Cheju-do No. 2 (K-40) Air Base, was a former Imperial Japanese Navy Air Service and United States Air Force (USAF) air base on southern Jeju Island, South Korea. It was mostly returned to farmland from the late 1960s onwards, though the site is still owned and used to some extent by the Republic of Korea Air Force, in particular a grass airstrip known semi-officially as Alddreu Airport.

== Etymology ==
Altteureu, also rendered aldeureu (알드르), is a Jeju-language term meaning "lower area".

== History ==
The airfield, then known as Altehru Airfield, was originally developed between 1926 and 1930 during the Japanese Imperial period. The local population were used as forced labour to flatten and clear the landscape, and later to build underground tunnels. Initially, it was primarily used as a refueling station, as well as a base for reconnaissance and maritime patrol aircraft. During the Second Sino-Japanese War it was also used as a forward base of the Omura Naval Air Group for the bombing of cities in China such as Shanghai and Nanjing.

=== World War II ===
Among other things, the base was used for the training of kamikaze pilots and by the end of the war it housed 2500 naval aviation troops and 25 aircraft in hardened aircraft shelters. Nearing the end of the Pacific War the Japanese were facing an inevitable defeat. Fearing a fight on Japanese soil, they planned on using Jeju's Alddreu Airfield as a last resort to defend against the Allied forces.

=== Korean War ===
The USAF designated the base as Cheju-do No.2 or K-40. It was apparently mainly used as a refueling & communications facility and came under the umbrella of the 100th Air Base Wing from 5 August 1951. Along with an airfield security company of the USAF's Air Police, there were communications, civil engineering, and food service companies permanently based at K-40 during this period.

=== Postwar ===
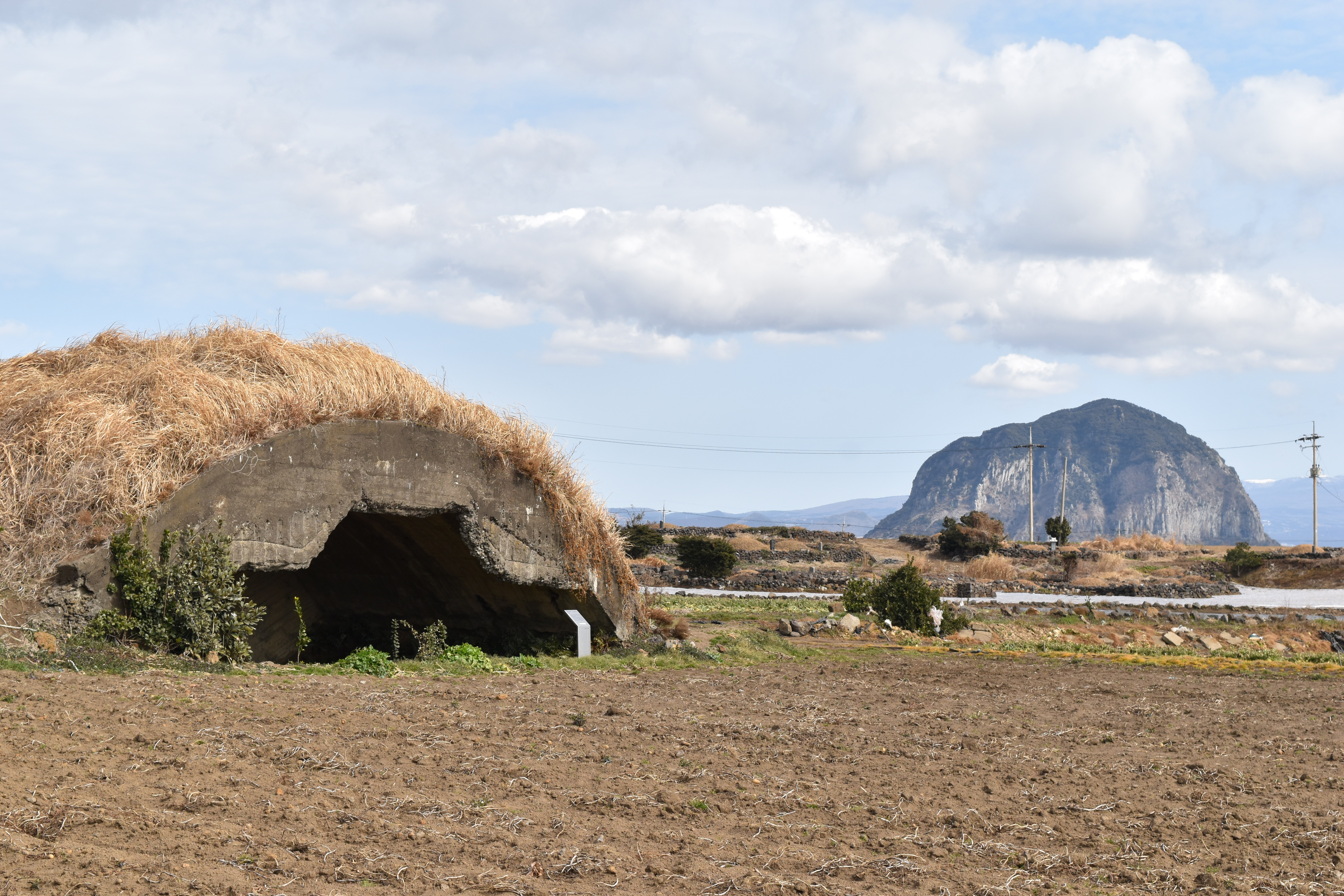
Hangars at the base (2018)

A TACAN facility was built on the base, now known as Altteureu Airfield, during the early 1960s. Alddreu was handed over by the USAF to the ROKAF in the later part of that decade. The base continues to be owned by the Korean Air Force but has been largely leased to civilians since the time of the handover, with most of the site being currently used as potato fields, though a large number of pre- and post-war facilities are still intact to one degree or another. These include 19 (out of an original 20) World War II aircraft bunkers, and a 1,400-meter grass runway which is still in use as a reserve airstrip by the ROKAF.

Seogwipo City planned at one stage during the late 2000s to develop the area as a theme park.

== See also ==
- Jeju International Airport
- Imperial Japanese Navy Aviation Bureau
- Imperial Japanese Navy Land Forces
- Operation Blacklist Forty
- United States Army Military Government in Korea
- United States Air Force In South Korea
