= Government-General of Chōsen Gazette =

1910–1945 publication in colonial Korea

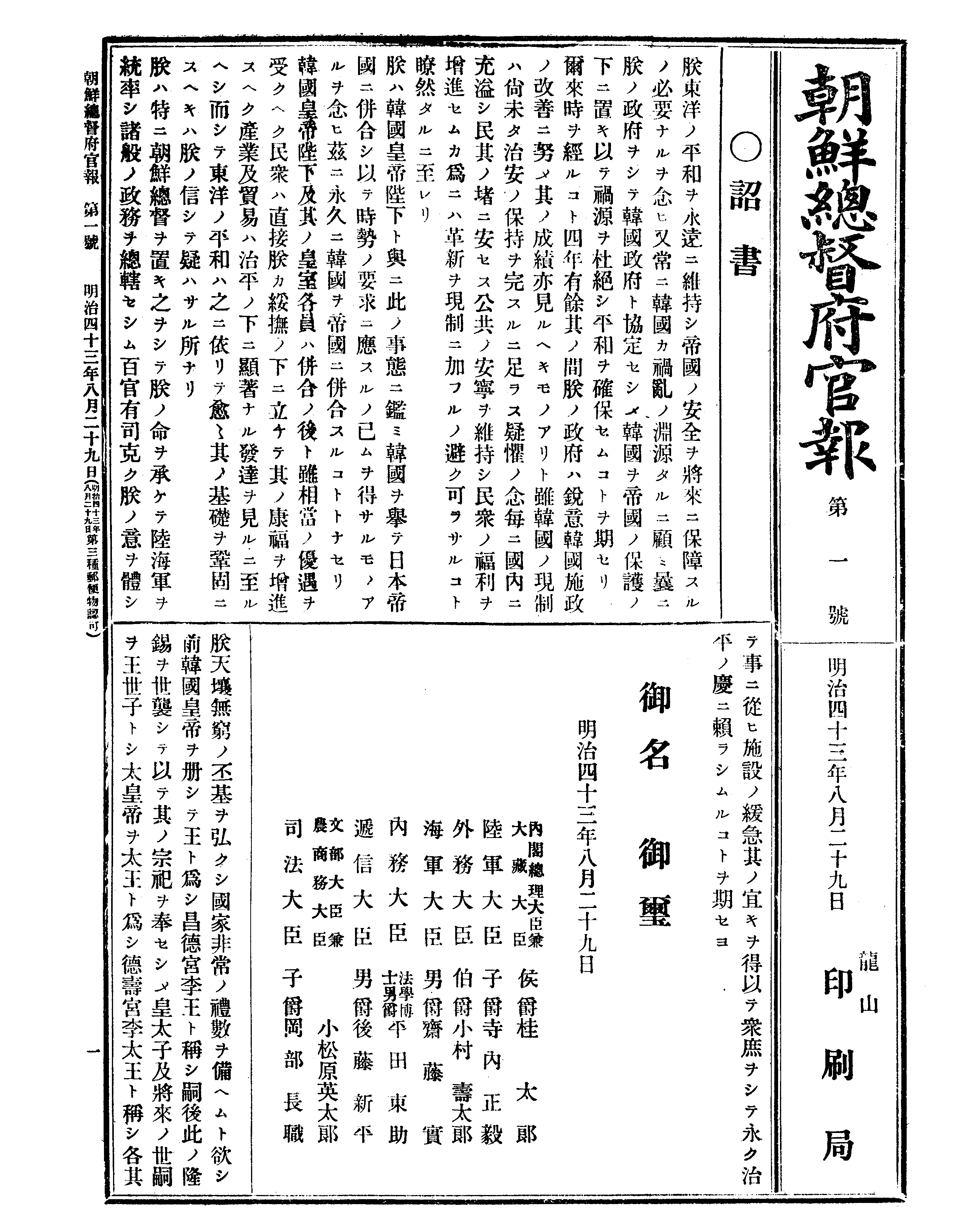
- Cover of the August 29, 1910 first edition
- Frequency: Daily
- Format: Government gazette
- Publisher: Government-General of Chōsen
- First issue: August 29, 1910
- Final issue: August 30, 1945
- Country: Korea, Empire of Japan
- Based in: Keijō (Seoul)
- Language: Japanese

The Government-General of Chōsen Gazette (朝鮮總督府官報; Korean: 조선총독부 관보) was a daily Japanese-language government gazette of the Government-General of Chōsen, the Japanese colonial government in Korea. It was published from August 29, 1910, until August 30, 1945.

It was published almost every day throughout the colonial period. It published around 10,000 issues total, containing 130,000 pages and 200 million characters. It contained information on a variety of topics, including business transactions, administrative activities, the results of surveys or studies, current affairs, and changes in colonial government personnel. It is now considered a highly valuable resource for studying the 1910–1945 Japanese colonial period.

An archive of the publication is available online for free, courtesy of the National Institute of Korean History. The archive has been transcribed, and is searchable and indexed.

== See also ==
- List of newspapers in Korea (includes Japanese newspapers)
- History of newspapers in Korea
- Category:Japanese-language newspapers published in Korea
