= Korea under Japanese rule =

1910–1945 colony of the Empire of Japan

Korea 조선 朝鮮
- 1910–1945
- Flag Coat of arms
- Anthem: 君が代 ("Kimigayo"); His Majesty's Reign
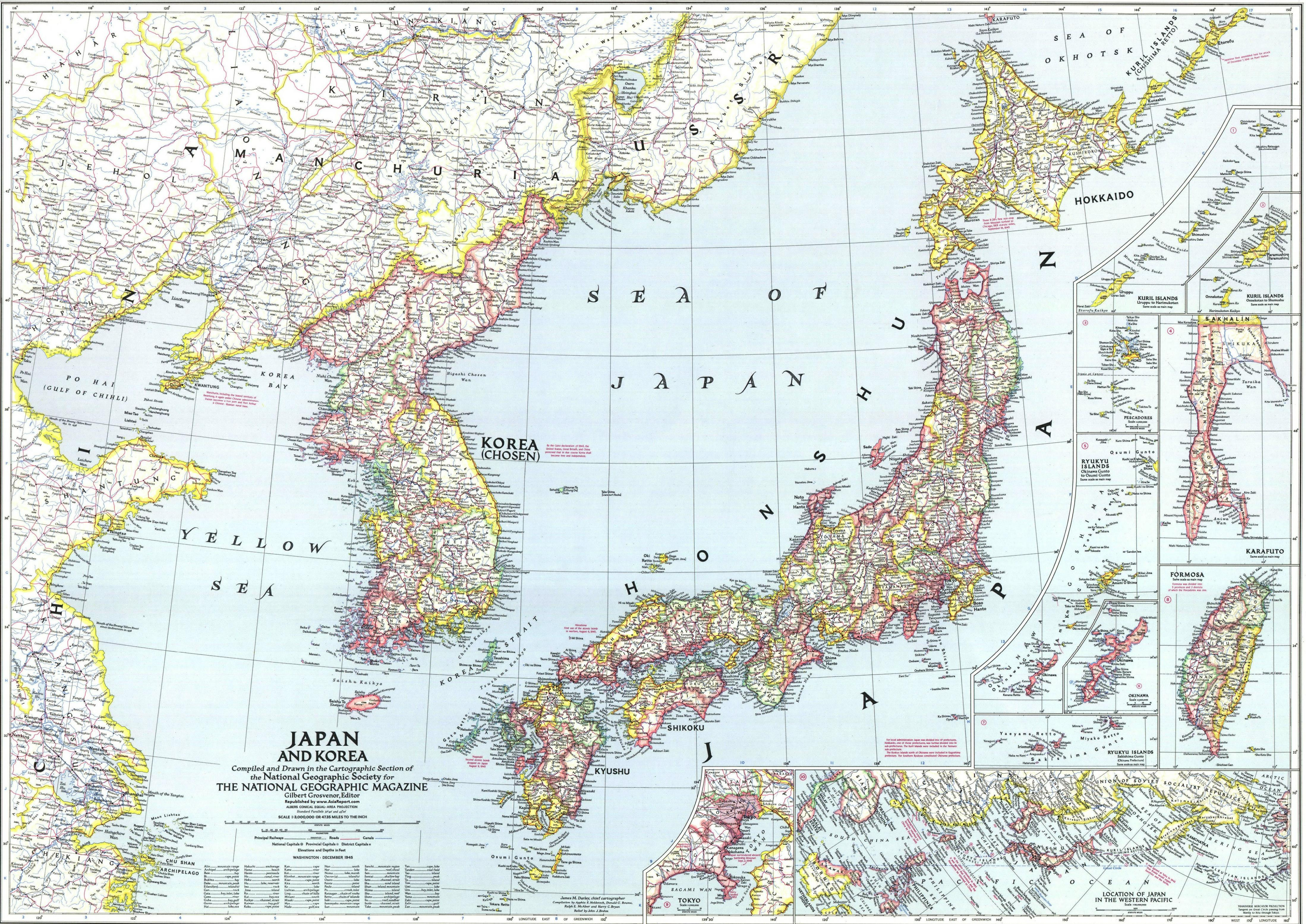
- 1945 National Geographic map of Korea
- Status: Colony of the Empire of Japan
- Capital and largest city: Keijō^{a} (now Seoul, South Korea); 37°34′39″N 126°58′37″E
- Official languages: Japanese; Korean
- Religion: De jure: None; De facto: State Shinto; Confucianism; Buddhism; Shamanism; Taoism; Christianity; Cheondoism^{b}
- Demonym: Korean
- Emperor
  - 1910–1912: Meiji
  - 1912–1926: Taishō
  - 1926–1945: Shōwa
- Governor-General
  - 1910–1916 (first): Terauchi Masatake
  - 1944–1945 (last): Nobuyuki Abe
- Historical era: Empire of Japan
  - Japanese protectorate: 17 November 1905
  - Annexation treaty signed: 22 August 1910
  - Annexation by Japan: 29 August 1910
  - March First Movement: 1 March 1919
  - Sōshi-kaimei order: 10 November 1939
  - Surrender of Japan: 2 September 1945
  - Disestablished: 8 September 1945
  - Japanese claim relinquished: 28 April 1952
- Currency: Korean yen
Preceded by
Korean Empire
Succeeded by
1919: Provisional Government of the Republic of Korea
1945: People's Republic of Korea
Soviet Civil Administration
United States Army Military Government in Korea
- Today part of: North Korea; South Korea
- 1. Japanese: 京城, romanized: Keijō; Korean: 경성; RR: Gyeongseong; MR: Kyŏngsŏng; 2. According to Korean Christians

From 1910 to 1945, Korea was ruled by the Empire of Japan as a colony under the name Chōsen (朝鮮), the Japanese reading of "Joseon". (Note: "Chōsen" was recognized as Korea's name internationally until the end of colonial period.)

Japan first took Korea into its sphere of influence during the late 1800s. Both Korea (Joseon) and Japan had been under policies of isolationism, with Joseon being a tributary state of Qing China. However, in 1854, Japan was forcibly opened by the United States. It then rapidly modernized under the Meiji Restoration, while Joseon continued to resist foreign attempts to open it up. Japan eventually succeeded in forcefully opening Joseon with the unequal Japan–Korea Treaty of 1876. Afterwards, Japan embarked on a decades-long process of defeating its local rivals, securing alliances with Western powers, and asserting its influence in Korea. Japan assassinated the defiant Korean queen and intervened in the Donghak Peasant Revolution. After Japan defeated China in the 1894–1895 First Sino–Japanese War, Joseon became nominally independent and declared the short-lived Korean Empire. Japan defeated Russia in the 1904–1905 Russo-Japanese War, making it the sole regional power.

Japan acted quickly to fully absorb Korea. It first made Korea a protectorate under the Japan–Korea Treaty of 1905, and ruled the country indirectly through the Japanese Resident-General of Korea. After forcing Emperor Gojong to abdicate in 1907, Japan formally annexed Korea with the Japan–Korea Treaty of 1910. For decades it administered the territory by its appointed Governor-General of Chōsen, who was based in Keijō (Seoul). Japan made sweeping changes in Korea. Under the pretext of the racial theory known as Nissen dōsoron, it began a process of Japanization, eventually functionally banning the use of Korean names and the Korean language altogether. Its forces transported tens of thousands of cultural artifacts to Japan. Hundreds of historic buildings, such as the Gyeongbokgung and Deoksugung palaces, were either partially or completely demolished.

Japan built infrastructure and industry to develop the colony. It directed the construction of railways, ports, and roads, although in numerous cases, workers were subjected to extremely poor working circumstances and discriminatory pay. While Korea's economy grew under Japan, scholars argue that many of the infrastructure projects were designed to extract resources from the peninsula, and not to benefit its people. In addition, Koreans faced heavy taxation, with rates in some cases exceeding 50%. Most of Korea's infrastructure built during this time was destroyed during the 1950–1953 Korean War.

These conditions led to the birth of the Korean independence movement, which acted both politically and militantly, sometimes within the Japanese Empire, but mostly from outside of it. Koreans were subjected to a number of mass murders, including the Gando massacre, Kantō Massacre, Jeamni massacre, and Shinano River incident. Beginning in 1939 and during World War II, Japan mobilized around 5.4 million Koreans to support its war effort. Many were moved forcefully from their homes, and set to work in generally extremely poor working conditions. Many women and girls were forced into sexual slavery as "comfort women" to Japanese soldiers. In addition to these atrocities, millions of Koreans fell victim to various Japanese war crimes throughout the colonial period, including forced labor, human experimentation, and systemic starvation. Ultimately, the nature of Japanese imperial rule and its widespread war crimes led to immense suffering and loss of life, leaving a deep and lasting scar on the nation's history. After the surrender of Japan at the end of the war, Korea was liberated from Japanese colonial rule, but was immediately divided into occupation zones under the rule of the Soviet Union and of the United States, led to the foundations of both North and South Korea in 1948.

The legacy of Japanese colonization has been hotly contested, and it continues to be extremely controversial. There is a significant range of opinions in both South Korea and Japan, and historical topics regularly cause diplomatic issues. Within South Korea, a particular focus is the role of the numerous ethnic Korean collaborators with Japan. They have been variously punished or left alone. This controversy is exemplified in the legacy of Park Chung Hee, South Korea's most influential and controversial president. He collaborated with the Japanese military and continued to praise it even after the colonial period. Until 1965, South Korea and Japan had no functional diplomatic relations, until they signed the Treaty on Basic Relations. It declared "already null and void" all treaties made between the Empires of Japan and Korea on or before 22 August 1910. Despite this, relations between Japan and South Korea have oscillated between warmer and cooler periods, often due to conflicts over the historiography of this era.

== Terminology ==
During the period of Japanese colonial rule, Korea was officially known as Chōsen (朝鮮), although the former name continued to be used internationally.

In South Korea, the period is usually described as the "Imperial Japanese compulsive occupation period" (Korean: 일제강점기; Hanja: 日帝强占期; RR: Ilje Gangjeomgi). Other terms, although often considered obsolete, include "Japanese Imperial Period" (일제시대; 日帝時代; Ilje Sidae), "The dark Japanese Imperial Period" (일제암흑기; 日帝暗黑期; Ilje Amheukgi), and "Wae (Japanese) administration period" (왜정시대; 倭政時代; Wae-jeong Sidae).

In Japan, the term "Chōsen of the Japanese-Governed Period" (日本統治時代の朝鮮, Nippon Tōchi-jidai no Chōsen) has been used.

== Background ==
=== Political turmoil in Korea ===
==== Japan–Korea Treaty of 1876 ====
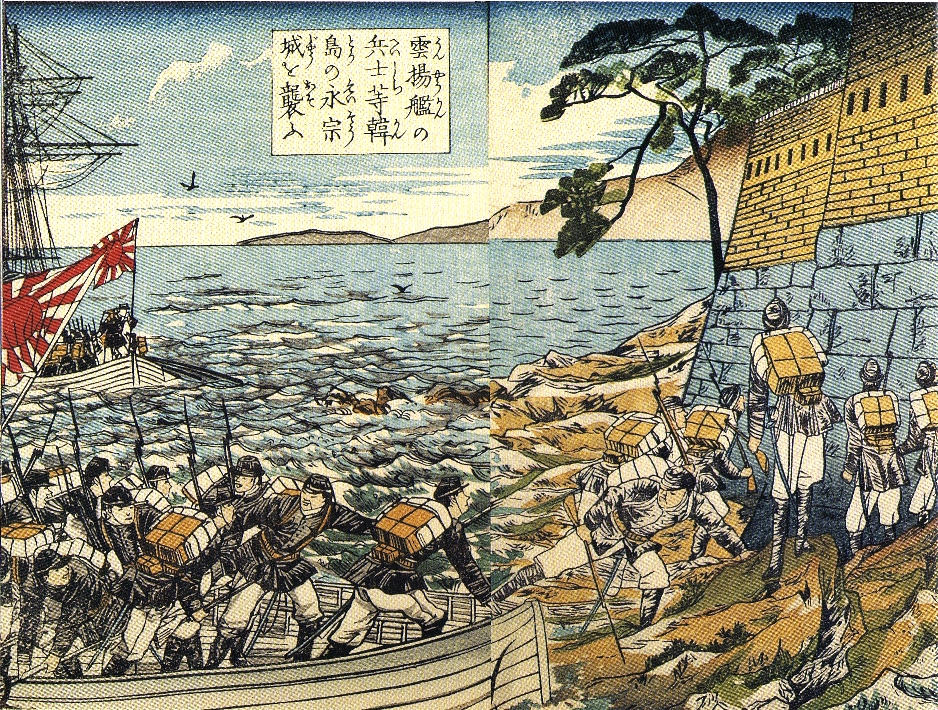
Japanese marines landing from the Unyo at Yeongjong Island which is near Ganghwa

On 27 February 1876, the Japan–Korea Treaty of 1876 was signed. It was designed to open up Korea to Japanese trade, and the rights granted to Japan under the treaty were similar to those granted Western powers in Japan following the visit of Commodore Perry in 1854. The treaty ended Chinese suzerainty over Korea, forced opening of three Korean ports to Japanese trade, granted extraterritorial rights to Japanese citizens, and was an unequal treaty signed under duress (gunboat diplomacy) of the Ganghwa Island incident of 1875.

==== Imo Incident ====
The regent Daewongun, who remained opposed to any concessions to Japan or the West, helped organize the Mutiny of 1882, an anti-Japanese outbreak against Queen Min and her allies. Motivated by resentment of the preferential treatment given to newly trained troops, the Daewongun's forces, or "old military", killed a Japanese training cadre, and attacked the Japanese legation. Japanese diplomats, policemen, students, and some Min clan members were also killed during the incident. The Daewongun was briefly restored to power, only to be forcibly taken to China by Chinese troops dispatched to Seoul to prevent further disorder.

In August 1882, the Japan–Korea Treaty of 1882 indemnified the families of the Japanese victims, paid reparations to the Japanese government in the amount of 500,000 yen, and allowed a company of Japanese guards to be stationed at the Japanese legation in Seoul.

==== Kapsin Coup ====
The struggle between the Heungseon Daewongun's followers and those of Queen Min was further complicated by competition from a Korean independence faction known as the Progressive Party (Gaehwa-dang), as well as the Conservative faction. While the former sought Japan's support, the latter sought China's support.

On 4 December 1884, the Progressive Party, assisted by the Japanese, attempted the Kapsin Coup, in which they attempted to maintain Gojong but replace the government with a pro-Japanese one. They also wished to liberate Korea from Chinese suzerainty. However, this proved short-lived, as conservative Korean officials requested the help of Chinese forces stationed in Korea. The coup was put down by Chinese troops, and a Korean mob killed both Japanese officers and Japanese residents in retaliation. Some leaders of the Progressive Party, including Kim Okkyun, fled to Japan, while others were executed. For the next 10 years, Japanese expansion into the Korean economy was approximated only by the efforts of tsarist Russia, but eventually would be annexed by Japan in 1910 (See Prelude to annexation).

==== Donghak Revolution and First Sino-Japanese War ====
Major battles and troop movements during the First Sino-Japanese War

The outbreak of the Donghak Peasant Revolution in 1894 provided a seminal pretext for direct military intervention by Japan in the affairs of Korea. In April 1894, Joseon asked for Chinese assistance in ending the revolt. In response, Japanese leaders, citing a violation of the Convention of Tientsin as a pretext, decided upon military intervention to challenge China. On 3 May 1894, 1,500 Qing forces appeared in Incheon. On 23 July 1894, Japan attacked Seoul in defiance of the Korean government's demand for withdrawal, and then occupied it and started the Sino-Japanese War. Japan won the First Sino-Japanese War, and China signed the Treaty of Shimonoseki in 1895. Among its many stipulations, the treaty recognized "the full and complete independence and autonomy of Korea", thus ending Joseon's tributary relationship with Qing, leading to the proclamation of the full independence of Joseon in 1895. At the same time, Japan suppressed the peasant revolt with Korean government forces.

==== Assassination of Queen Min ====
The Japanese minister to Korea, Miura Gorō, orchestrated a plot against 43-year-old Queen Min (later given the title of "Empress Myeongseong"), and on 8 October 1895, she was assassinated by Japanese agents. The Korean military unit, Hullyŏndae, participated in the assassination. With Korean aid, Japanese assassins were allowed to enter the palace Gyeongbokgung. In 2001, Russian reports on the assassination were found in the archives of the Foreign Ministry of the Russian Federation. The documents included the testimony of King Gojong, several witnesses of the assassination, and Karl Ivanovich Weber's report to Aleksey Lobanov-Rostovsky, the Foreign Minister of Russia, by Park Jonghyo. Weber was the chargé d'affaires at the Russian legation in Seoul at that time. According to a Russian eyewitness, Seredin-Sabatin, an employee of the king, a group of Japanese agents entered Gyeongbokgung, killed Queen Min, and desecrated her body in the north wing of the palace.

The Heungseon Daewongun returned to the royal palace the same day. On 11 February 1896, Gojong and the crown prince fled for protection at the Russian legation in Seoul, from which he governed for about a year.

=== Democracy protests and the proclamation of the Korean Empire ===
In 1896, various Korean activists formed the Independence Club. They advocated a number of societal reforms, including democracy and a constitutional monarchy, and pushed for closer ties to Western countries to counterbalance Japanese influence. It went on to be influential in Korean politics for the short time that it operated, to the chagrin of Gojong. Gojong eventually forcefully disbanded the organization in 1898.

In October 1897, Gojong returned to the palace Deoksugung, and proclaimed the founding of the Korean Empire at the royal altar Hwangudan. This symbolicly asserted Korea's independence from China, especially as Gojong demolished a reception hall that was once used to entertain Chinese ambassadors to build the altar.

=== Prelude to annexation ===
Flag of the Japanese Resident General of Korea (1905–1910)

Having established economic and military dominance in Korea in October 1904, Japan reported that it had developed 25 reforms which it intended to introduce into Korea by gradual degrees. Among these was the intended acceptance by the Korean Financial Department of a Japanese Superintendent, the replacement of Korean Foreign Ministers and consuls by Japanese and the "union of military arms" in which the military of Korea would be modeled after the Japanese military. These reforms were forestalled by the prosecution of the Russo-Japanese War from 8 February 1904, to 5 September 1905, which Japan won, thus eliminating Japan's last rival to influence in Korea.

Frustrated by this, King Gojong invited Alice Roosevelt Longworth, who was on a tour of Asian countries with William Howard Taft, to the Imperial Palace on 20 September 1905, to seek political support from the United States despite her diplomatic rudeness. However, it was after exchanging opinions through the Taft–Katsura agreement on 27 July 1905, that America and Japan would not interfere with each other on colonial issues.

Under the Treaty of Portsmouth, signed in September 1905, Russia acknowledged Japan's "paramount political, military, and economic interest" in Korea.

Two months later, Korea was obliged to become a Japanese protectorate by the Japan–Korea Treaty of 1905 and the "reforms" were enacted, including the reduction of the Korean Army from 20,000 to 1,000 men by disbanding all garrisons in the provinces, retaining only a single garrison in the precincts of Seoul. On 6 January 1905, Horace Allen, head of the American Legation in Seoul reported to his Secretary of State, John Hay, that the Korean government had been advised by the Japanese government "that hereafter the police matters of Seoul will be controlled by the Japanese gendarmerie" and "that a Japanese police inspector will be placed in each prefecture". A large number of Koreans organized themselves in education and reform movements, but Japanese dominance in Korea had become a reality.

In June 1907, the Second Peace Conference was held in The Hague. Emperor Gojong secretly sent three representatives to bring the problems of Korea to the world's attention. The three envoys, who questioned the legality of the protectorate convention, were refused access to the public debates by the international delegates. One of these representatives was missionary and historian Homer Hulbert. Out of despair, one of the Korean representatives, Yi Tjoune, committed suicide at The Hague.

In response, the Japanese government took stronger measures. On 19 July 1907, Emperor Gojong was forced to relinquish his imperial authority and appoint the Crown Prince as regent. Japanese officials used this concession to force the accession of the new Emperor Sunjong following abdication, which was never agreed to by Gojong. Neither Gojong nor Sunjong were present at the 'accession' ceremony. Sunjong was to be the last ruler of the Joseon dynasty, founded in 1392.

On 24 July 1907, a treaty was signed under the leadership of Lee Wan-yong and former Japanese Prime Minister Ito Hirobumi to transfer all rights of Korea to Japan. This led to a large-scale righteous army movement among Koreans, and disbanded troops joined the resistance forces. Japan's response to this was a scorched earth tactic using division-sized troops, which resulted in the movement of armed resistance organizations in Korea to Manchuria and Imperial Russia. Amid this confusion, on 26 October 1909, Ahn Jung-geun, a former volunteer soldier and a Korean nationalist, assassinated Hirobumi in Harbin.

Meanwhile, pro-Japanese populist groups such as the Iljinhoe assisted Japan as they were fascinated by Japan's pan-Asianism, hoping that Korea would have self-autonomy. They served as representative consultant for Ryohei Uchida, and were used for propaganda with the support of the Japanese government. On 3 December 1909, he and Lee Wan-yong issued a statement demanding a political alliance with Japan.

However, it took the form of Japan's annexation of Korean territory and these groups was disbanded by Terauchi Masatake on 26 September 1910.

=== Militant resistance ===
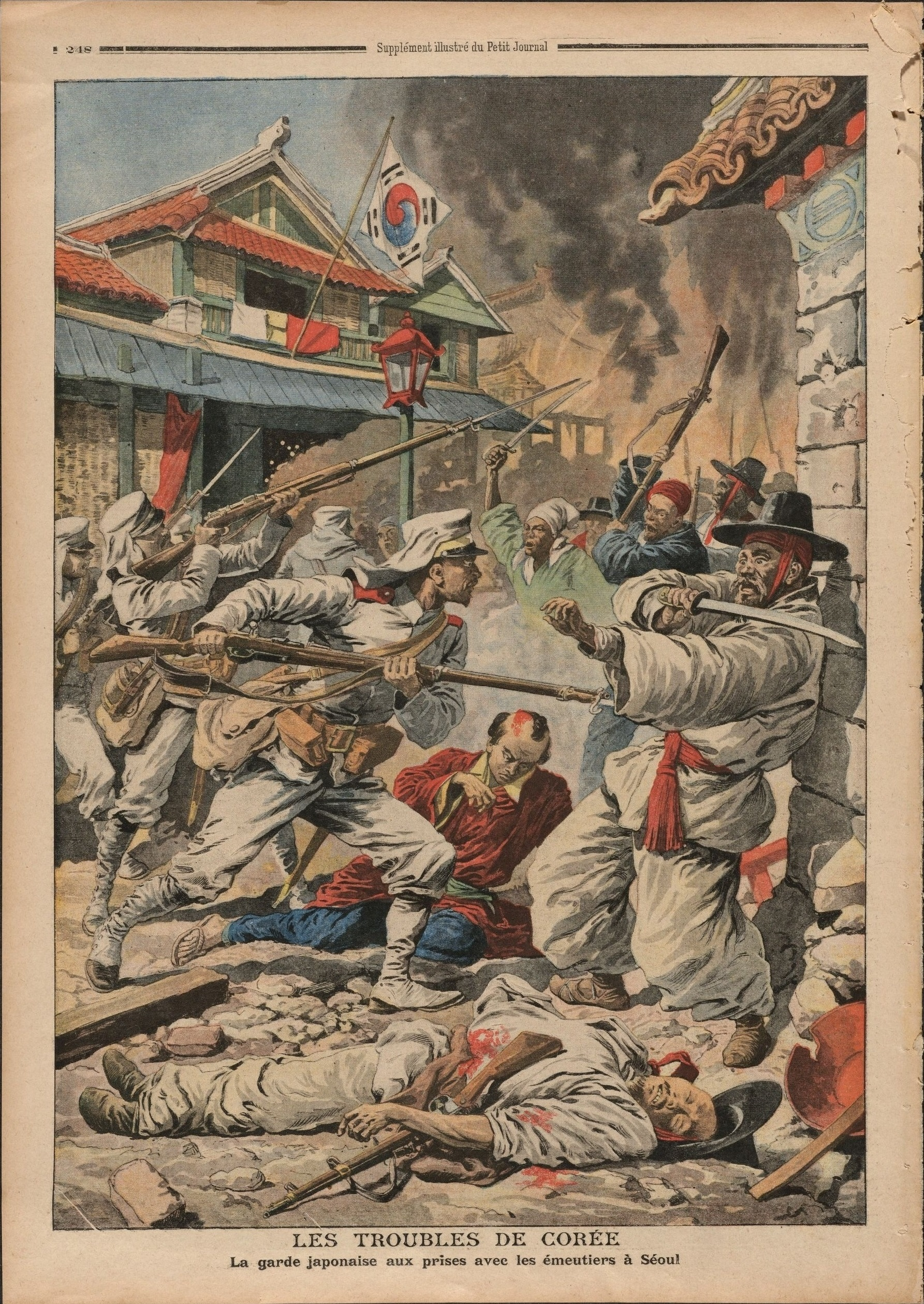
Battle of Namdaemun in 1907 – Le Petit Journal

During the prelude to the 1910 annexation, a number of irregular civilian militias known as "righteous armies" arose. They consisted of tens of thousands of peasants engaged in anti-Japanese armed rebellion. After the Korean army was disbanded in 1907, former soldiers joined the armies and fought the Japanese army at Namdaemun. They were defeated, and largely fled into Manchuria, where they joined the guerrilla resistance movement that persisted until Korea's 1945 liberation.

=== Military police ===
As Korean resistance against Japanese rule intensified, Japanese replaced the Korean police system with their military police, the Kempeitai. Akashi Motojiro was appointed the commander of Japanese military police forces. The Japanese eventually replaced Imperial Korean police forces in June 1910, and they combined police forces and military police, firmly establishing the rule of military police. After the annexation, Akashi started to serve as the Chief of Police. These military police officers started to have great authority over Koreans. Not only Japanese but also Koreans served as police officers.

== Japan–Korea annexation treaty (1910) ==
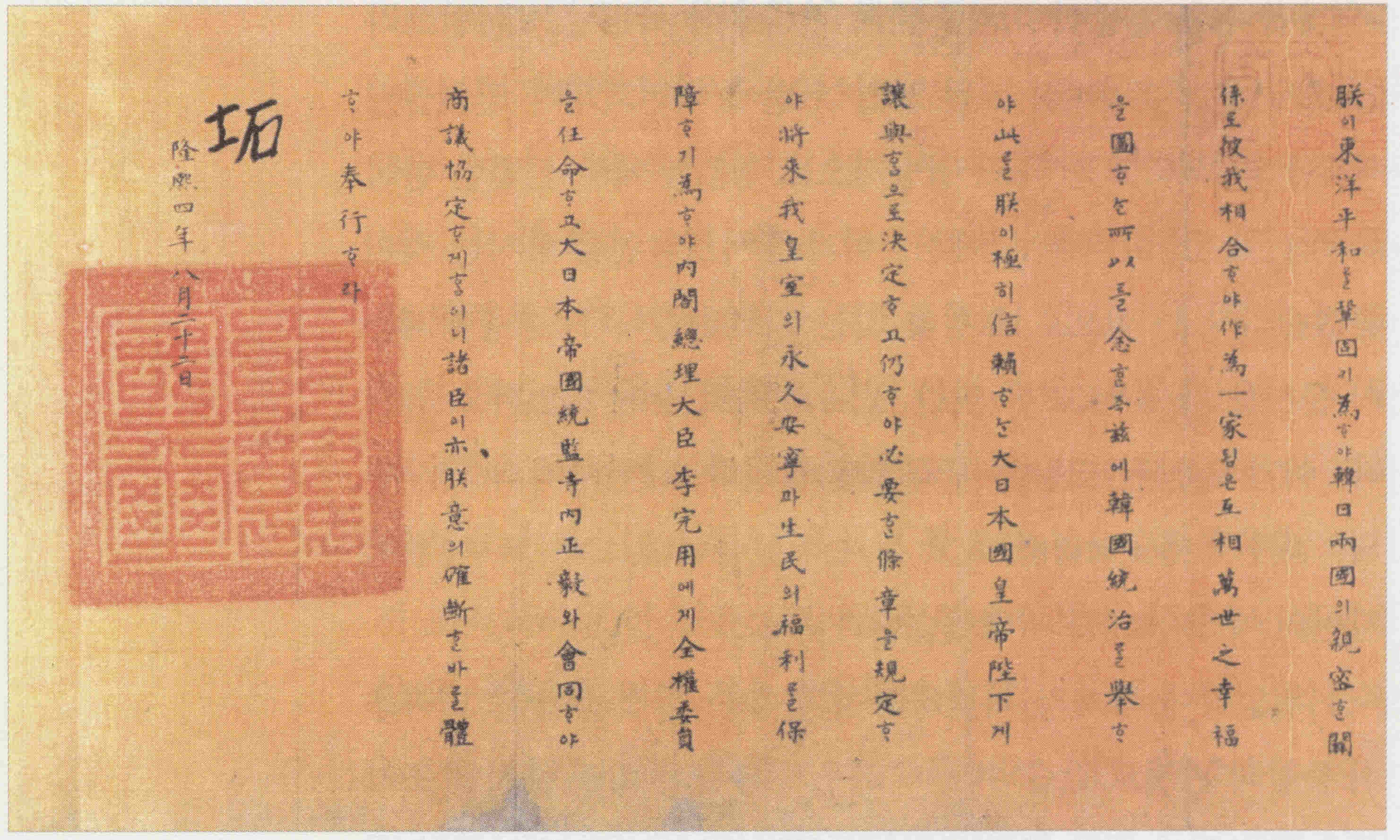
General power of attorney to Lee Wan-yong sealed and signed, by the last emperor, Sunjong on 22 August 1910 (융희4년; 隆熙4年)

In May 1910, the Minister of War of Japan, Terauchi Masatake, was given a mission to finalize Japanese control over Korea after the previous treaties (the Japan–Korea Treaty of February 1904 and the Japan–Korea Treaty of 1907) had made Korea a protectorate of Japan and had established Japanese hegemony over Korean domestic politics. On 22 August 1910, Japan effectively annexed Korea with the Japan–Korea Treaty of 1910 signed by Ye Wanyong, Prime Minister of Korea, and Terauchi Masatake, who became the first Governor-General of Chōsen.

The treaty became effective the same day and was published one week later. The treaty stipulated:

- Article 1: His Majesty the Emperor of Korea concedes completely and definitely his entire sovereignty over the whole Korean territory to His Majesty the Emperor of Japan.
- Article 2: His Majesty the Emperor of Japan accepts the concession stated in the previous article and consents to the annexation of Korea to the Empire of Japan.

Both the protectorate and the annexation treaties were declared already void in the 1965 Treaty on Basic Relations between Japan and the Republic of Korea.

This period is also known as Military Police Reign Era (1910–19) in which police had the authority to rule the entire country. Japan was in control of the media, law, as well as government by physical power and regulations.

In March 2010, 109 Korean intellectuals and 105 Japanese intellectuals met on the 100th anniversary of Japan–Korea Treaty of 1910 where they jointly declared this annexation treaty null and void. They declared these statements separately in their capital cities (Seoul and Tōkyō) with a simultaneous press conference. They announced the "Japanese empire pressured the outcry of the Korean Empire and people and forced by Japan–Korea Treaty of 1910 and full text of a treaty was false and text of the agreement was also false". They also declared the "Process and formality of "Japan–Korea Treaty of 1910" had huge deficiencies and therefore the treaty was null and void. This implied the March First Movement was not an illegal movement.

== Early years and expansion (1910–1941) ==
=== Japanese migration and land ownership ===
From around the time of the First Sino-Japanese War of 1894–1895, Japanese merchants started settling in towns and cities in Korea seeking economic opportunity. By 1908 the number of Japanese settlers in Korea was somewhere below the figure of 500,000, comprising one of the nikkei communities in the world at the time.

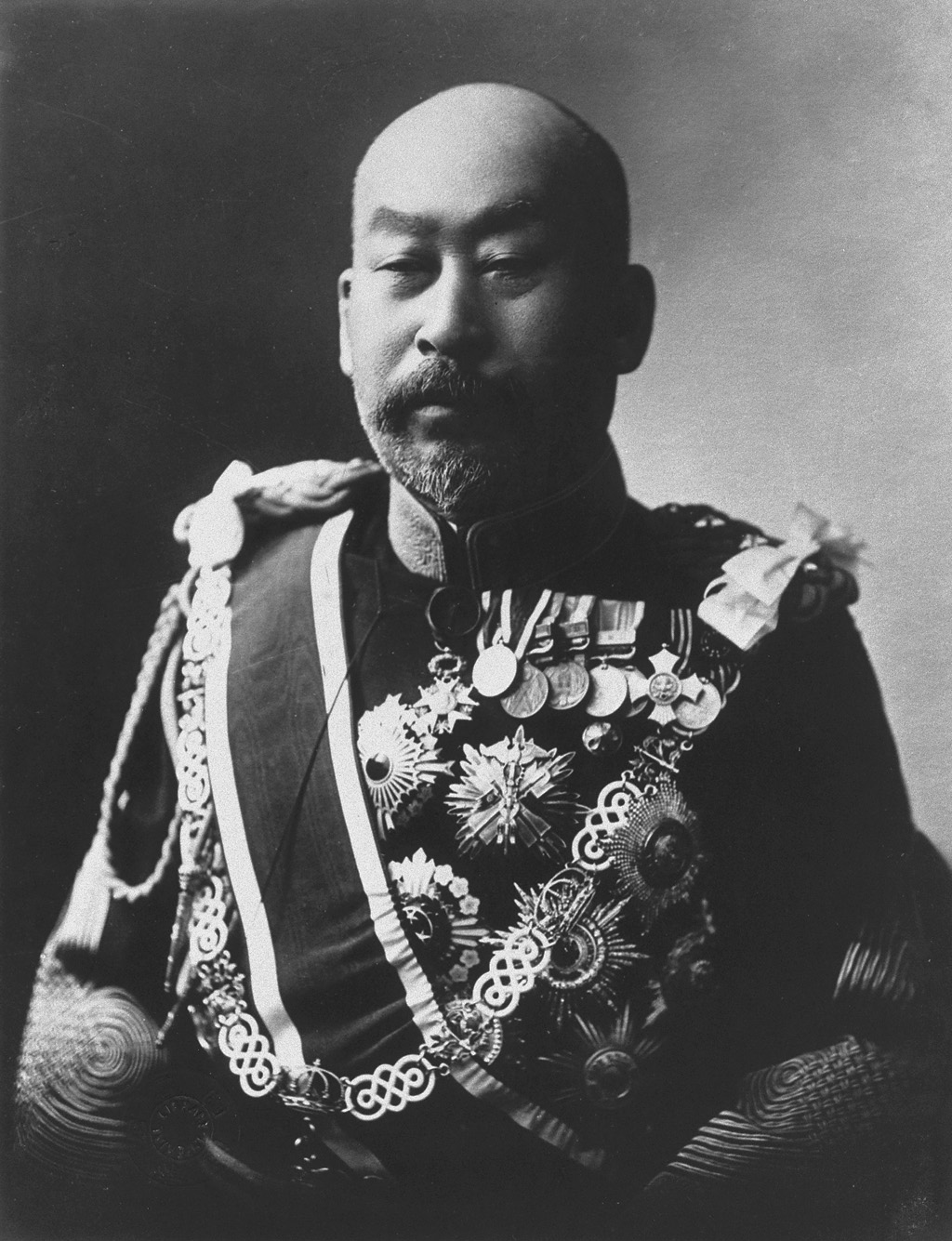
Terauchi Masatake, the first Governor-General

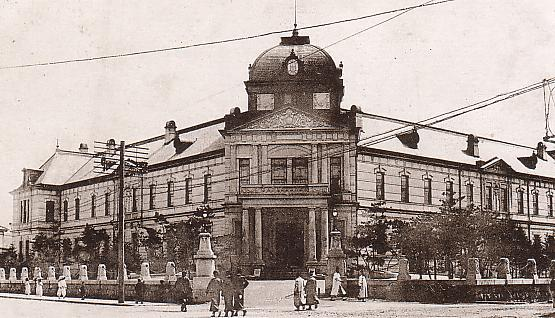
Headquarters of the Oriental Development Company in Keijō

Many Japanese settlers showed interest in acquiring agricultural land in Korea even before Japanese land-ownership was officially legalized in 1906. Governor-General Terauchi Masatake facilitated settlement through land reform. The Korean land-ownership system featured absentee landlords, only partial owner-tenants and cultivators with traditional (but no legal proof of) ownership. By 1920, 90 percent of Korean land had proper ownership of Koreans. Terauchi's new Land Survey Bureau conducted cadastral surveys that established ownership on the basis of written proof (deeds, titles, and similar documents). The system denied ownership to those who could not provide such written documentation; these turned out to be mostly high-class and impartial owners who had only traditional verbal cultivator-rights. Japanese landlords included both individuals and corporations (such as the Oriental Development Company). Because of these developments, Japanese landownership soared, as did the amount of land taken over by private Japanese companies.

Many former Korean landowners, as well as agricultural workers, became tenant farmers, having lost their entitlements almost overnight because they could not pay for the land reclamation and irrigation improvements forced on them. Compounding the economic stresses imposed on the Korean peasantry, the authorities forced Korean peasants to do long days of compulsory labor to build irrigation works; Japanese imperial officials made peasants pay for these projects in the form of heavy taxes, impoverishing many of them and causing even more of them lose their land. Although many other subsequent developments placed ever greater strain on Korea's peasants, Japan's rice shortage in 1918 was the greatest catalyst for hardship. During that shortage, Japan looked to Korea for increased rice cultivation; as Korean peasants started producing more for Japan, however, the amount they took to eat dropped precipitously, causing much resentment among them.

By 1910 an estimated 7 to 8% of all arable land in Korea had come under Japanese control. This ratio increased steadily; as of the years 1916, 1920, and 1932, the ratio of Japanese land ownership increased from 36.8 to 39.8 to 52.7%. The level of tenancy was similar to that of farmers in Japan itself; however, in Korea, the landowners were mostly Japanese, while the tenants were all Koreans. As often occurred in Japan itself, tenants had to pay over half their crop in rent.

By the 1930s the growth of the urban economy and the exodus of farmers to the cities had gradually weakened the hold of the landlords. With the growth of the wartime economy throughout the Second World War, the government recognized landlordism as an impediment to increased agricultural productivity, and took steps to increase control over the rural sector through the formation in Japan in 1943 of the Central Agricultural Association (中央農会, chūō nōkai), a compulsory organization under the wartime command economy.

The Japanese government had hoped emigration to its colonies would mitigate the population boom in the naichi(内地), but had largely failed to accomplish this by 1936. According to figures from 1934, Japanese in Chōsen numbered approximately 561,000 out of a total population of over 21 million, less than 3%. By 1939 the Japanese population increased to 651,000, mostly from Japan's western prefectures. During the same period, the population in Chōsen grew faster than that in the naichi. Koreans also migrated to the naichi in large numbers, especially after 1930; by 1939 there were over 981,000 Koreans living in Japan. Challenges which deterred Japanese from migrating into Chōsen included lack of arable land and population density comparable to that of Japan.

=== Anthropology and cultural heritage ===
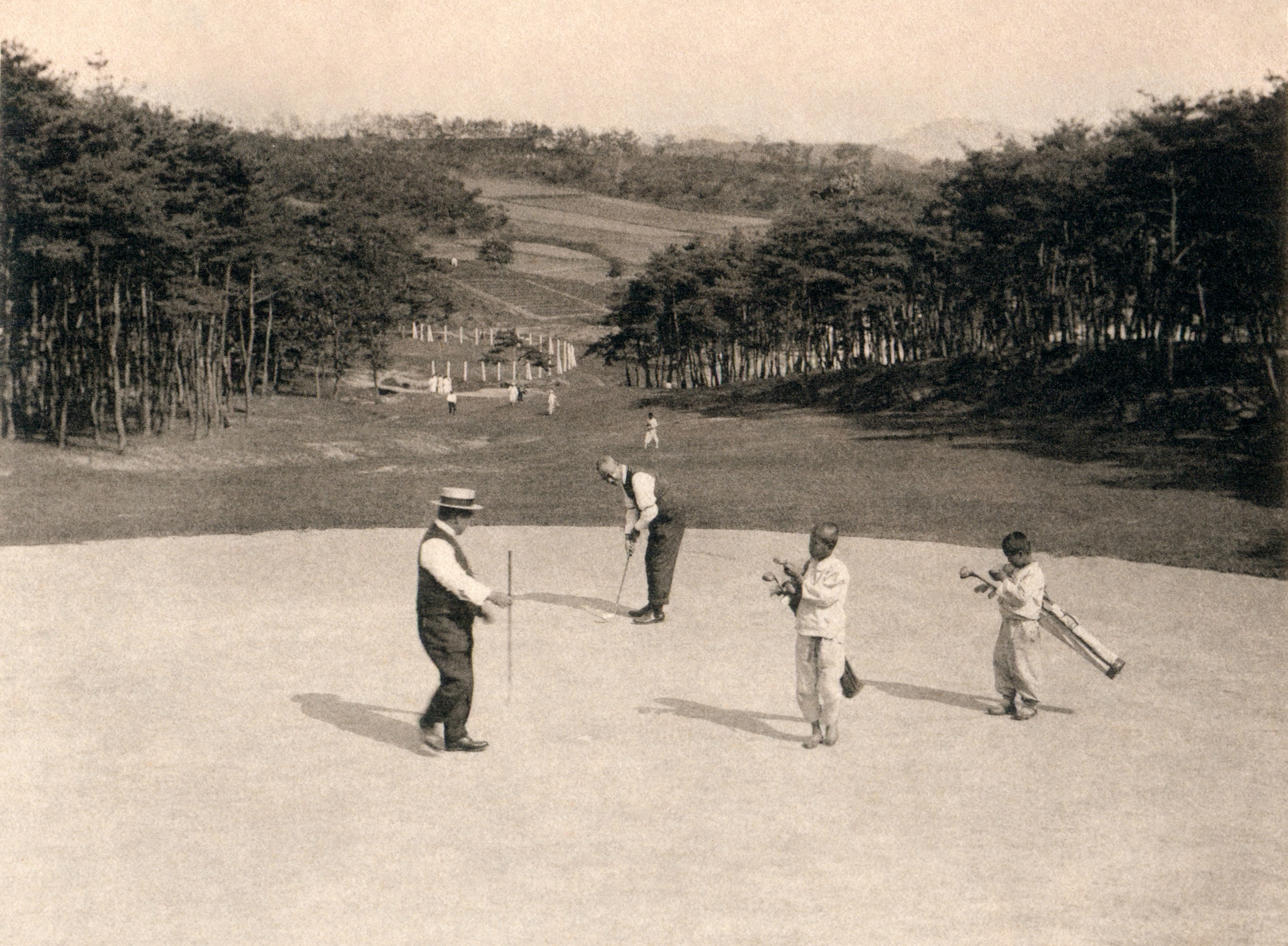
In 1921, Japan turned a Korean royal cemetery into a golf course, with the graves still directly on the course. This occurred at what is now Hyochang Park.

Japan sent anthropologists to Korea who took photos of the traditional state of Korean villages, serving as evidence that Korea was "backwards" and needed to be modernized.

In 1925, the Japanese government established the Korean History Compilation Committee, and it was administered by the Governor-General and engaged in collecting Korean historical materials and compiling Korean history. According to the Doosan Encyclopedia, some mythology was incorporated. The committee supported the theory of a Japanese colony on the Korean Peninsula called Mimana, which, according to E. Taylor Atkins, is "among the most disputed issues in East Asian historiography."

Japan executed the first modern archaeological excavations in Korea. The Japanese administration also relocated some artifacts; for instance, a stone monument (棕蟬縣神祠碑), which was originally located in the Liaodong Peninsula, then under Japanese control, was taken out of its context and moved to Pyongyang. As of April 2020, 81,889 Korean cultural artifacts are in Japan. According to the Overseas Korean Cultural Heritage Foundation, not all the artifacts were moved illegally. Adding to the challenge of repatriating illegally exported Korean cultural properties is the lack of experts in Korean art at overseas museums and institutions, alterations made to artifacts that obscure their origin, and that moving Korean artifacts within what was previously internationally recognized Japanese territory was lawful at the time. The South Korean government has been continuing its efforts to repatriate Korean artifacts from museums and private collections overseas.

The royal palace Gyeongbokgung was partially destroyed beginning in the 1910s, to make way for the Japanese General Government Building as well as the colonial Chōsen Industrial Exhibition. Hundreds of historic buildings in Deoksugung were also destroyed to make way for the Yi Royal Family Museum of Fine Art. The displays in the museum reportedly intentionally contrasted traditional Korean art with examples of modern Japanese art, to portray Japan as progressive and legitimize Japanese rule. The National Palace Museum of Korea, originally built as the Korean Imperial Museum in 1908 to preserve the treasures in the Gyeongbokgung, was retained under the Japanese administration but renamed Museum of the Yi Dynasty in 1938.

The Governor-General instituted a law in 1933 to preserve Korea's most important historical artifacts. The system established by this law, retained as the present-day National Treasures of South Korea and National Treasures of North Korea, was intended to preserve Korean historical artifacts, including those not yet unearthed. Japan's 1871 Edict for the Preservation of Antiquities and Old Items could not be automatically applied to Korea due to Japanese law, which required an imperial ordinance to apply the edict in Korea. The 1933 law to protect Korean cultural heritages was based on the Japanese 1871 edict.

=== Anti-Chinese riots of 1931 ===
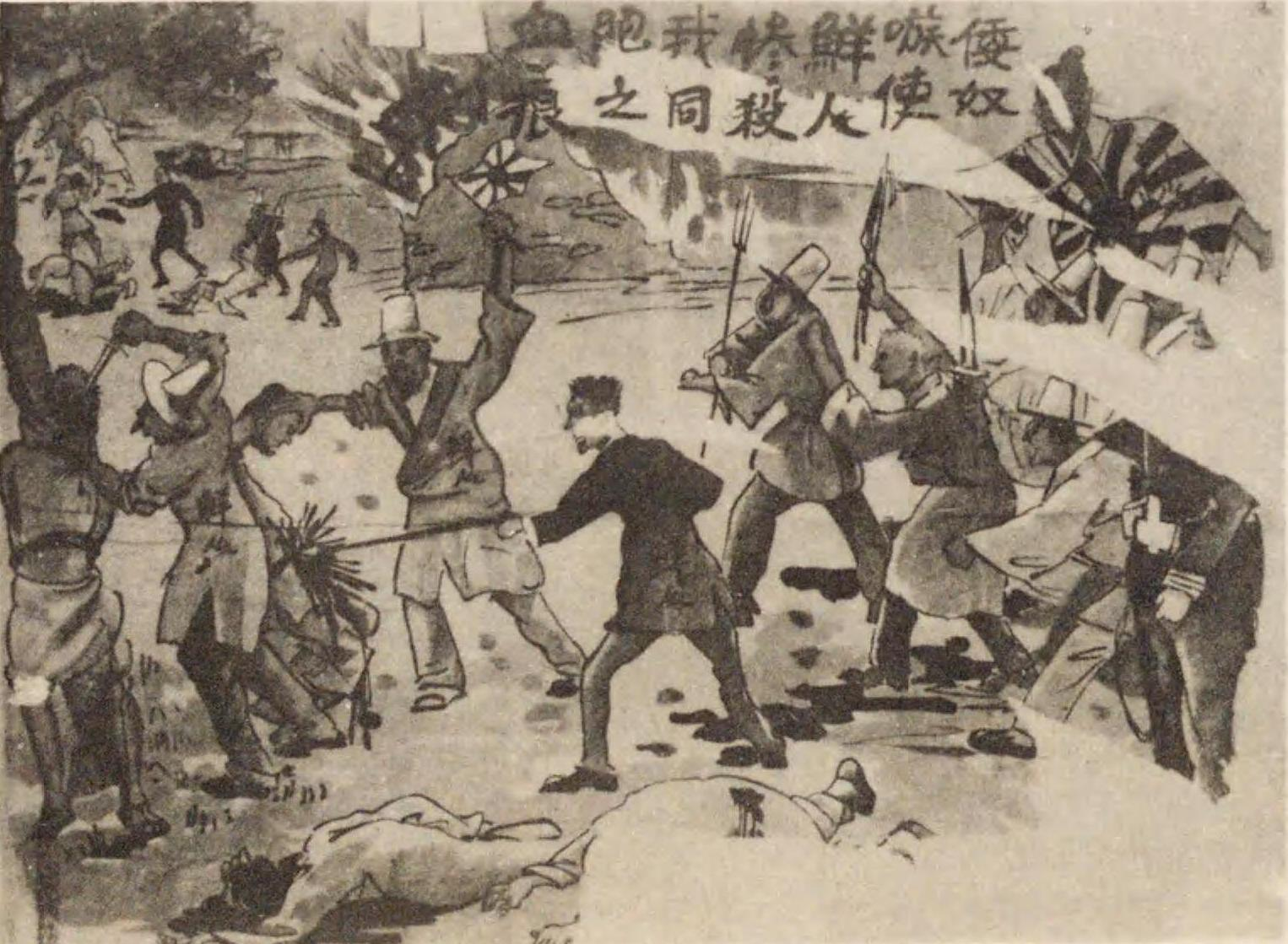
Chinese anti-Japanese poster published after reprisals by Koreans

Due to a waterway construction permit, in the small town of Wanpaoshan in Manchuria near Changchun, "violent clashes" broke out between the local Chinese and Korean immigrants on 2 July 1931. The Chosun Ilbo, a major Korean newspaper, misreported that many Koreans had died in the clashes, sparking a Chinese exclusion movement in urban areas of the Korean Peninsula. The worst of the rioting occurred in Pyongyang on 5 July. Approximately 127 Chinese people were killed, 393 wounded, and a considerable number of properties were destroyed by Korean residents. Republic of China further alleged the Japanese authorities in Korea did not take adequate steps to protect the lives and property of the Chinese residents, and blamed the authorities for allowing inflammatory accounts to be published. As a result of this riot, the Minister of Foreign Affairs Kijūrō Shidehara, who insisted on Japanese, Chinese, and Korean harmony, lost his position.

=== Order to change names ===
In 1911, the proclamation "Matter Concerning the Changing of Korean Names" (朝鮮人ノ姓名改称ニ関スル件) was issued, barring ethnic Koreans from taking Japanese names and retroactively reverting the names of Koreans who had already registered under Japanese names back to the original Korean ones. By 1939, however, this position was reversed and Japan's focus had shifted towards cultural assimilation of the Korean people; Imperial Decree 19 and 20 on Korean Civil Affairs (Sōshi-kaimei) went into effect, whereby ethnic Koreans were forced to surrender their traditional use of clan-based Korean family name system, in favor of a new surname to be used in the family register. The surname could be of their own choosing, including their native clan name, but in practice many Koreans received a Japanese surname. There is controversy over whether or not the adoption of a Japanese surname was effectively mandatory, or merely strongly encouraged.

Number of renaming applications in 1940
Month	household	%
Feb.	15,746	0.4%
Mar.	61,579	1.5%
Apr.	157,074	3.9%
May.	500,840	12.5%
Jun.	1,081,564	27.0%
Jul.	2,153,393	53.7%
Aug.	3,220,693	80.3%

== World War II ==
=== National Mobilization Law ===
==== Forcing of labor and migration ====
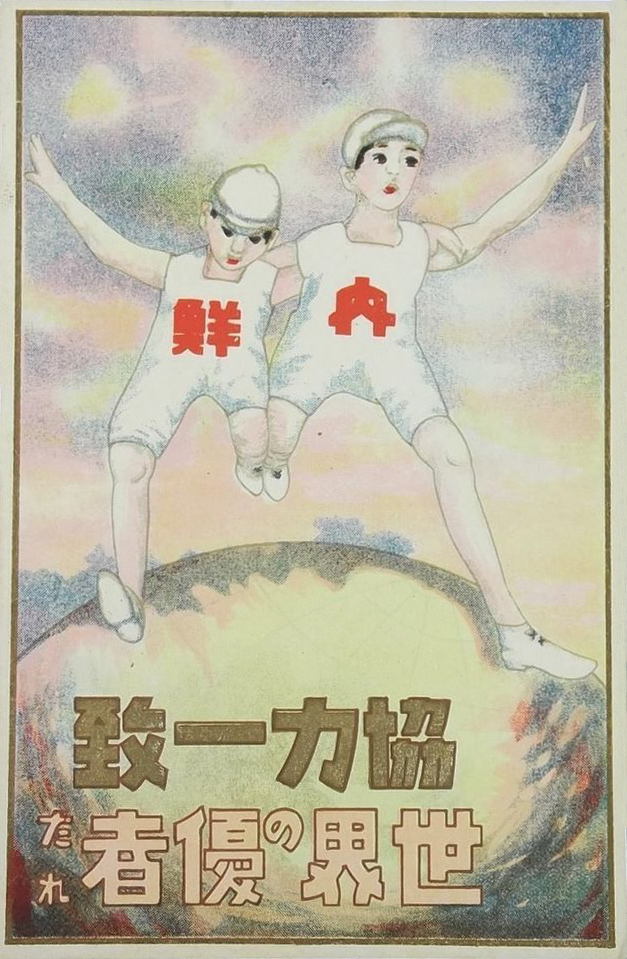
Japan-Korea Cooperative Unity, World Leader. – The notion of racial and imperial unity of Korea and Japan gained widespread following among the literate minority of the middle and upper classes.

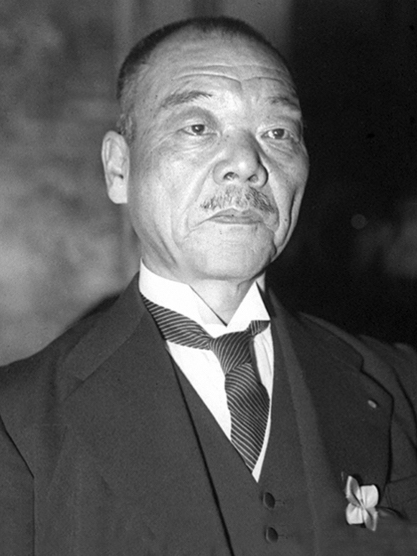
Kuniaki Koiso, Governor-General of Chōsen from 1942 to 1944, implemented a draft of Koreans for wartime labor.

From 1939, labor shortages as a result of conscription of Japanese men for the military efforts of World War II led to organized official recruitment of Koreans to work in mainland Japan, initially through civilian agents, and later directly, often involving elements of coercion. As the labor shortage increased, by 1942, the Japanese authorities extended the provisions of the National Mobilization Law to include the conscription of Korean workers for factories and mines in Korea, Manchukuo, and the involuntary relocation of workers to Japan itself as needed.

The combination of immigrants and forced laborers during World War II brought the total to over 2 million Koreans in Japan by the end of the war, according to estimates by the Supreme Commander for the Allied Powers.

Of the 5,400,000 Koreans conscripted, about 670,000 were taken to mainland Japan (including Karafuto Prefecture, present-day Sakhalin, now part of Russia) for civilian labor. Those who were brought to Japan were often forced to work under conditions that have been described as appalling and dangerous. Although Koreans were reportedly treated better than laborers from other countries, large numbers still died. In Japan, 60,000 of the 670,000 mobilized laborers died. In Korea and Manchuria, estimates of deaths range between 270,000 and 810,000.

Korean laborers were also found as far as the Tarawa Atoll, where during the Battle of Tarawa only 129 of the 1200 laborers survived. According to testimonies in Japanese records, Korean laborers on the Mili Atoll were given "whale meat" to consume, which was actually human flesh from other dead Koreans. They rebelled after learning the truth, and were killed by the dozens in the aftermath. Korean laborers also worked in Korea itself, notably in Jeju where in the later stages of the Pacific War, Korean laborers expanded airfields and built facilities at Altteureu Airfield to block a US invasion of the Japanese mainland and in 1945 laborers on Songaksan (where several airstrips were located) were ordered to smooth down the slope to prevent American tanks being able to go up.

Most Korean atomic-bomb victims in Japan had been drafted for work at military industrial factories in Hiroshima and Nagasaki. In the name of humanitarian assistance, Japan paid South Korea four billion yen (approx. thirty five million dollars) and built a welfare center for those suffering from the effects of the atomic bomb.

==== Korean service in the Japanese military ====
Korean military participation until 1943
Year	Applicants	Applicants accepted	Acceptance rate [%]
1938	2,946	406	13.8
1939	12,348	613	5.0
1940	84,443	3,060	3.6
1941	144,743	3,208	2.2
1942	254,273	4,077	1.6
1943	303,294	6,300	2.1

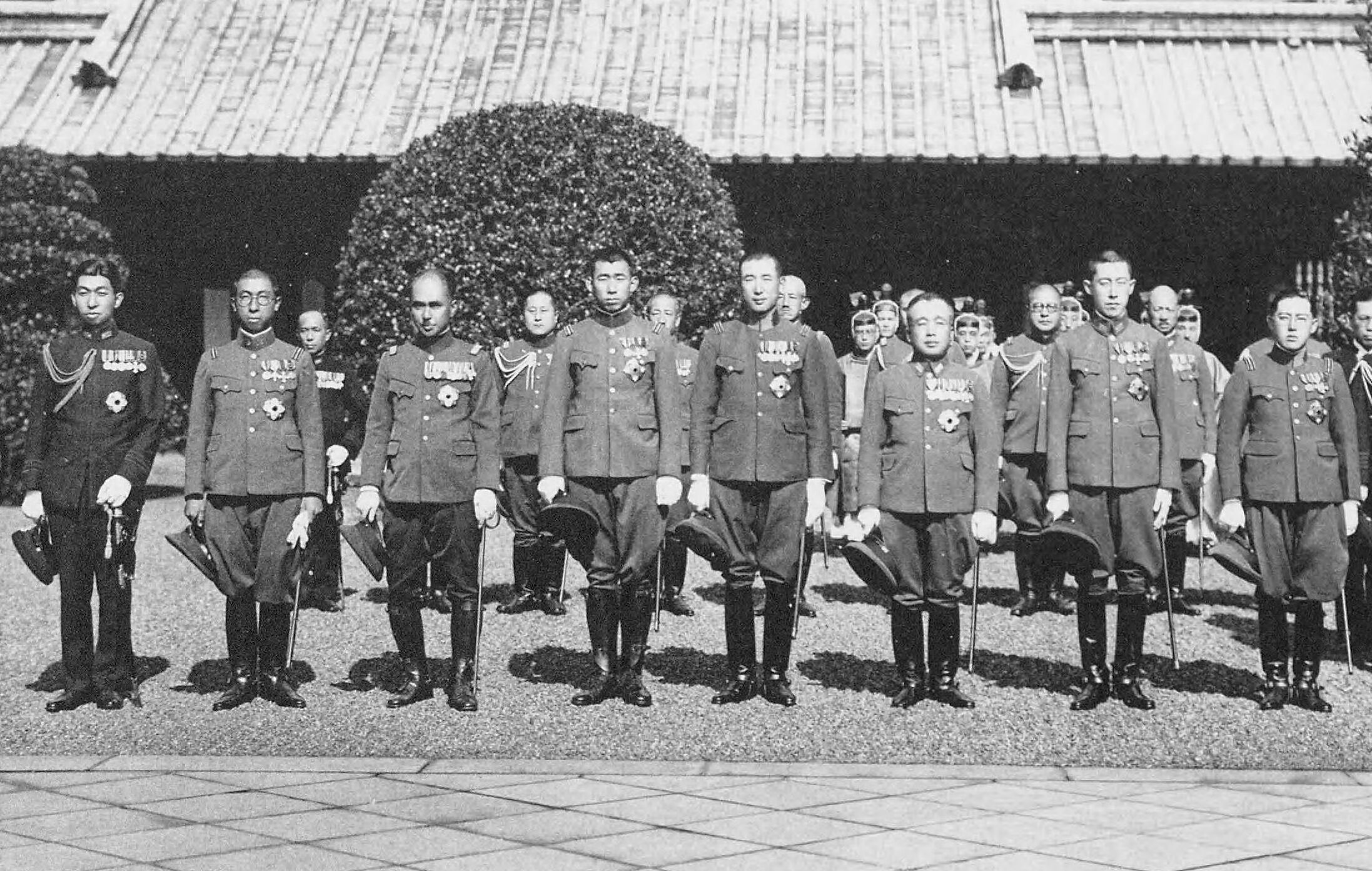
Korean royalty of the House of Yi (front row, right to left): Yi Wu, Yi Geon and Yi Un as officers of the Imperial Japanese Army, together with members of the Japanese imperial family at the Yasukuni Shrine, 1938

Japan did not draft ethnic Koreans into its military until 1944 when the tide of World War II turned against it. Until 1944, enlistment in the Imperial Japanese Army by ethnic Koreans was voluntary, and highly competitive. From a 14% acceptance rate in 1938, it dropped to a 2% acceptance rate in 1943 while the raw number of applicants increased from 3000 per annum to 300,000 in just five years during World War II. Recent scholarly research indicates that the Japanese authorities employed substantial coercive and administrative pressure during the recruitment of Koreans into military service in the late colonial era. According to historian Pyo Young-Soo, while the authorities formally characterized the process as "voluntary enlistment," archival documentation reveals systemic use of coercive mechanisms, such as issuing enlistment orders and invoking regulatory authority to secure compliance.

Motivation of Korean Applicants in 1941
age	Applicants	Compulsion	Etc.	Total
17	5,673	9,355	1,915	16,943
18	6,943	11,089	2,012	20,044
19	7,771	12,117	2,318	22,206
20	7,591	11,844	2,125	21,560
21	6,486	10,704	1,742	18,932
22	5,357	8,722	1,610	15,689
23	3,965	6,682	1,132	11,779
24	2,694	4,347	1,146	8,187
25+	3,704	4,812	1,190	9,706
Total	50,184	79,672	15,190	145,046
%	34.6%	55.0%	10.4%	100%

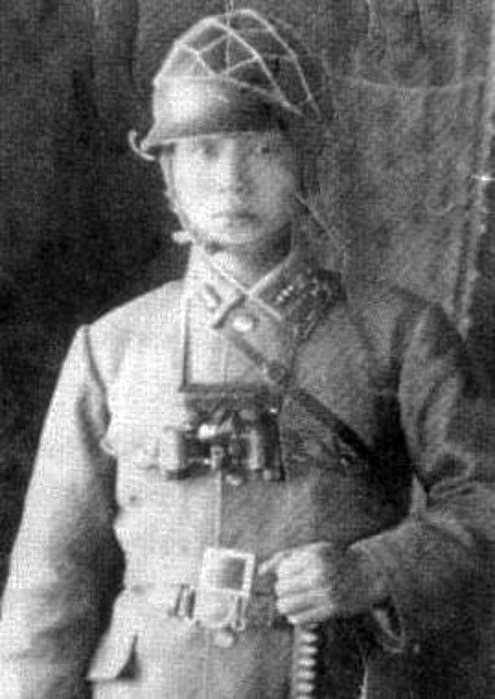
Park Chung Hee, future leader of South Korea, as a soldier of the Manchukuo Imperial Army

Other Korean officers who served Japan moved on to successful careers in post-colonial South Korea. Examples include Park Chung Hee, who became president of South Korea; Chung Il-kwon, prime minister from 1964 to 1970; Paik Sun-yup, South Korea's youngest general who was famous for his command of the 1st Infantry Division during the defense of the Pusan Perimeter, and Kim Suk-won, a colonel of the Imperial Japanese Army who subsequently became a general of the South Korean army. The first ten of the Chiefs of Army Staff of South Korea graduated from the Imperial Japanese Army Academy and none from the Korean Liberation Army.

Officer cadets had been joining the Japanese Army since before the annexation by attending the Imperial Japanese Army Academy. Enlisted soldier recruitment began as early as 1938, when the Japanese Kwantung Army in Manchuria began accepting pro-Japanese Korean volunteers into the army of Manchukuo, and formed the Gando Special Force. Koreans in this unit specialized in counter-insurgency operations against communist guerillas in the region of Jiandao. The size of the unit grew considerably at an annual rate of 700 men, and included such notable Koreans as General Paik Sun-yup, who served in the Korean War. Historian Philip Jowett noted that during the Japanese occupation of Manchuria, the Gando Special Force "earned a reputation for brutality and was reported to have laid waste to large areas which came under its rule".

Starting in 1944, Japan started the conscription of Koreans into the armed forces. All Korean men were drafted to either join the Imperial Japanese Army, as of April 1944, or work in the military industrial sector, as of September 1944. Before 1944, 18,000 Koreans passed the examination for induction into the army. Koreans provided workers to mines and construction sites around Japan. The number of conscripted Koreans reached its peak in 1944 in preparation for war. From 1944, about 200,000 Korean men were inducted into the army.

During World War II, American soldiers frequently encountered Korean soldiers within the ranks of the Imperial Japanese Army. Most notably was in the Battle of Tarawa, which was considered during that time to be one of the bloodiest battles in U.S. military history. A fifth of the Japanese garrison during this battle consisted of Korean laborers, where on the last night of the battle a combined 300 Japanese soldiers and Korean laborers did a last ditch charge. Like their Japanese counterparts, many of them were killed.

The Japanese, however, did not always believe they could rely on Korean laborers to fight alongside them. In Prisoners of the Japanese, author Gaven Daws wrote, "[O]n Tinian there were five thousand Korean laborers and so as not to have hostiles at their back when the Americans invaded, the Japanese killed them."

After the war, 148 Koreans were convicted of Class B and C Japanese war crimes, 23 of whom were sentenced to death (compared to 920 Japanese who were sentenced to death), including Korean prison guards who were particularly notorious for their brutality during the war. The figure is relatively high considering that ethnic Koreans made up a small percentage of the Japanese military. Judge Bert Röling, who represented the Netherlands at the International Military Tribunal for the Far East, noted that "many of the commanders and guards in POW camps were Koreans – the Japanese apparently did not trust them as soldiers – and it is said that they were sometimes far more cruel than the Japanese." In his memoirs, Colonel Eugene C. Jacobs wrote that during the Bataan Death March, "the Korean guards were the most abusive. The Japanese didn't trust them in battle, so used them as service troops; the Koreans were anxious to get blood on their bayonets; and then they thought they were veterans."

Korean guards were sent to the remote jungles of Burma, where Lt. Col. William A. (Bill) Henderson wrote from his own experience that some of the guards overseeing the construction of the Burma Railway "were moronic and at times almost bestial in their treatment of prisoners. This applied particularly to Korean private soldiers, conscripted only for guard and sentry duties in many parts of the Japanese empire. Regrettably, they were appointed as guards for the prisoners throughout the camps of Burma and Siam." The highest-ranking Korean to be prosecuted after the war was Lieutenant General Hong Sa-ik, who was in command of all the Japanese prisoner-of-war camps in the Philippines.

=== Comfort women ===
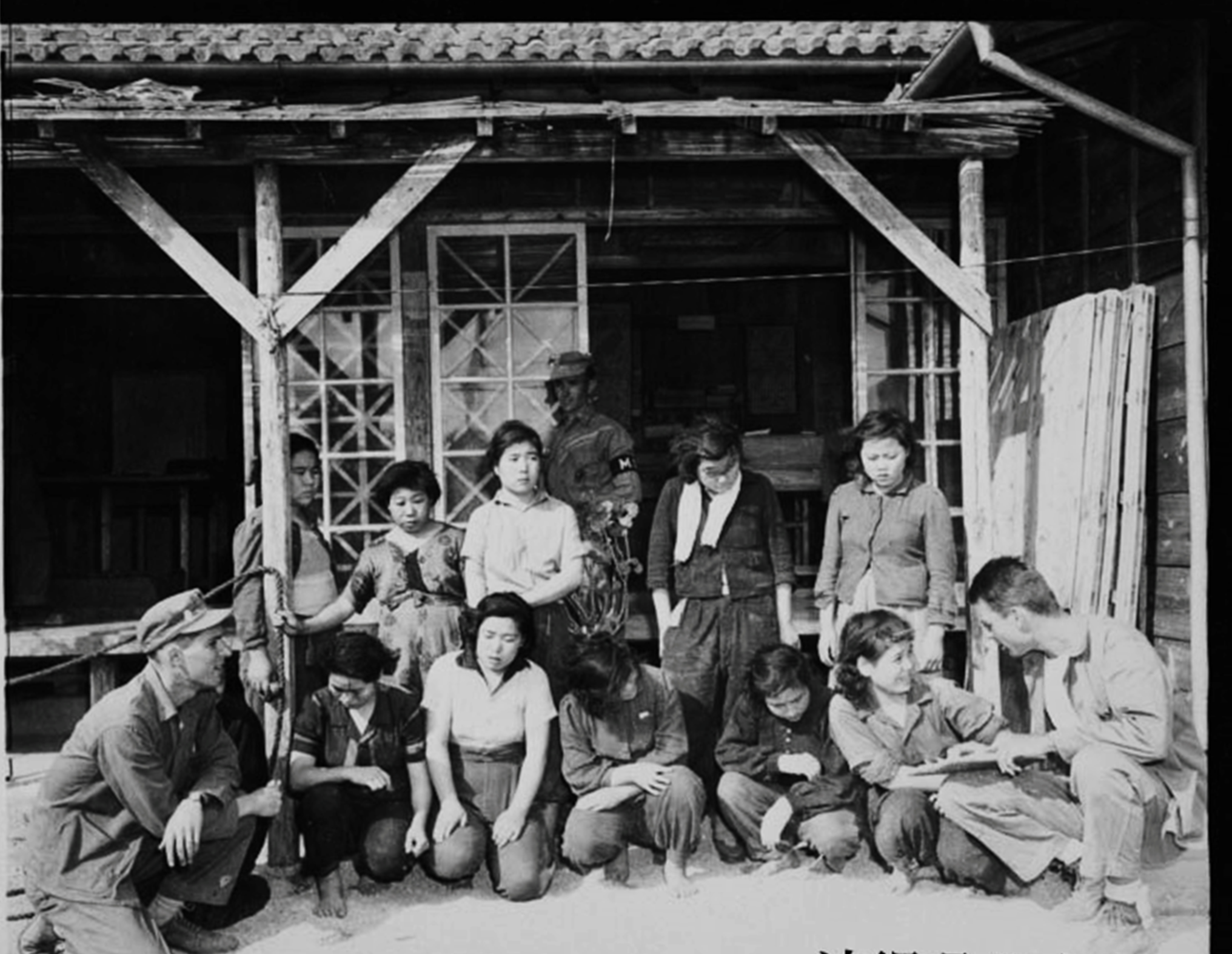
Korean comfort women on Okinawa being interviewed by U.S. marines after liberation

During World War II many ethnic Korean girls and women (mostly aged 12–17) were forced by the Japanese military to become sex slaves on the pretext of being hired for jobs such as a seamstresses or factory workers and were forced to provide sexual service for Japanese soldiers by agencies or their families against their wishes. These women were euphemistically called "comfort women".

According to an interrogation report by U.S. Army in 1944, comfort women were in good physical health. They were able to have a checkup once a week and to receive treatment lest they spread disease to the Japanese soldiers but not for their own health. However a 1996 United Nations Report detailed that "large numbers of women were forced to submit to prolonged prostitution under conditions which were frequently indescribably traumatic". Documents that survived the war revealed "beyond doubt the extent to which the Japanese forces took direct responsibility for the comfort stations" and that the published practices were "in stark contrast with the brutality and cruelty of the practice". Chizuko Ueno at Kyoto University cautions against the claim that women were not forced as the fact that "no positive sources exist supporting claims that comfort women were forced labor" must be treated with doubt, since "it is well known that the great majority of potentially damaging official documents were destroyed in anticipation of the Allied occupation".

The Asian Women's Fund claimed that during World War II the Imperial Japanese Army recruited anywhere from tens of thousands to hundreds of thousands of women from occupied territories to be used as sex slaves. Yoshimi Yoshiaki asserted that possibly hundreds of thousands of girls and women, mainly from China and the Korean Peninsula but also Southeast Asian countries occupied by the Imperial Japanese Army, as well as Australia and the Netherlands, were forced to serve as comfort women. According to testimonies, young women were abducted from their homes in countries under Imperial Japanese rule. In many cases women were lured with promises of work in factories or restaurants. In some cases propaganda advocated equity and the sponsorship of women in higher education. Other enticements were false advertising for nursing jobs at outposts or Japanese army bases; once recruited, they were incarcerated in comfort stations both inside their nations and abroad.

From the early nineties onward, former Korean comfort women have continued to protest against the Japanese government for apparent historical negationism of crimes committed by the Imperial Japanese Army and have sought compensation for their sufferings during the war. There has also been international support for compensation, such as from the European Union, the Netherlands, Canada and the Philippines. The United States passed House of Representatives House Resolution 121 on 30 July 2007, asking the Japanese government to redress the situation and to incorporate comfort women into school curriculum. Hirofumi Hayashi at the University of Manchester argues that the resolution has helped to counter the "arguments of ultrarightists flooding the mainstream mass media" and warned against the rationalization of the comfort women system.

=== Religion and ideology ===
Protestant Christian missionary efforts in Asia were quite successful in Korea. American Presbyterians and Methodists arrived in the 1880s and were well received. They served as medical and educational missionaries, establishing schools and hospitals in numerous cities. In the years when Korea was under Japanese control, some Koreans adopted Christianity as an expression of nationalism in opposition to the Japan's efforts to promote the Japanese language and the Shinto religion. In 1914 of 16 million Koreans, there were 86,000 Protestants and 79,000 Catholics. By 1934 the numbers were 168,000 and 147,000, respectively. Presbyterian missionaries were especially successful. Harmonizing with traditional practices became an issue. The Protestants developed a substitute for Confucian ancestral rites by merging Confucian-based and Christian death and funerary rituals.

== Korean independence movement ==
=== Guerrilla resistance in Manchuria and Russia ===
Since the early 1900s, numerous Koreans based in Manchuria and Primorsky Krai in Russia waged a guerrilla war against the Japanese occupation. Beom-do Hong's unit ambushed and annihilated the Imperial Japanese Army that was advancing in Battle of Bongodong (Fengwudong) in June 1920. The combined forces of the independence army commanded by Kim Chwajin and Hong, while repeatedly retreating operationally, ambushed and killed about 1,500 Imperial Japanese soldiers in Battle of Cheongsanri (Qīngshānlǐ). In retaliation to the heavy losses at the Battle of Cheongsanri, the Imperial Japanese Army committed the Gando massacre, massacring between 5,000 and tens of thousands of Korean civilians in Gando. The Japanese invasion of Manchuria in 1932 and subsequent Pacification of Manchukuo deprived many of these groups of their bases of operation and supplies. Many were forced to either flee elsewhere in China, or to join the Red Army-backed forces in eastern Russia. One of the guerrilla leaders in this region was the future dictator of North Korea, Kim Il Sung. These experiences served as a basis for Kim's legitimacy after the liberation of Korea.

=== March First Movement ===
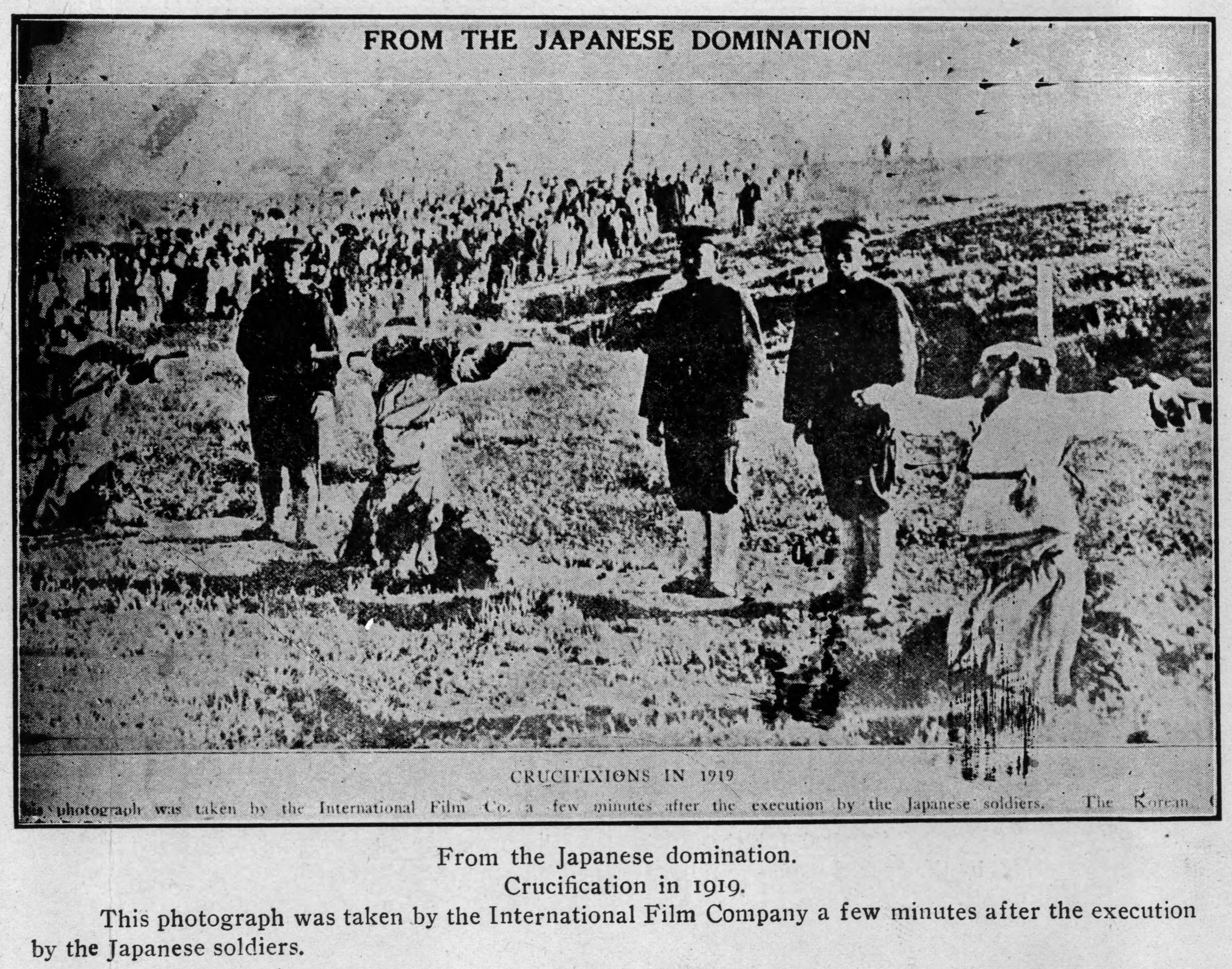
Korean Christians were crucified in the aftermath of the 1 March Movement protests (1919)

In January 1919, Emperor Gojong died suddenly, which led to widespread theories that he had been poisoned by Japanese agents. Anti-Japanese sentiment flared amongst Koreans. In Tokyo, Korean students issued a February 8 Declaration of Independence that declared Korea independent from Japan. Inspired by this, Koreans in Seoul issued their own declaration of independence, which was prominently read aloud in Tapgol Park. This gave rise to the nationwide 1 March Movement peaceful protests; it is estimated that 2 million people took part in these rallies. However, they were violently suppressed by Japan; according to Korean records, over a year of demonstrations, 46,948 were arrested, 7,509 killed and 15,961 wounded. According to Japanese figures, 8,437 were arrested, 553 killed and 1,409 wounded.

=== Provisional Government of the Republic of Korea ===
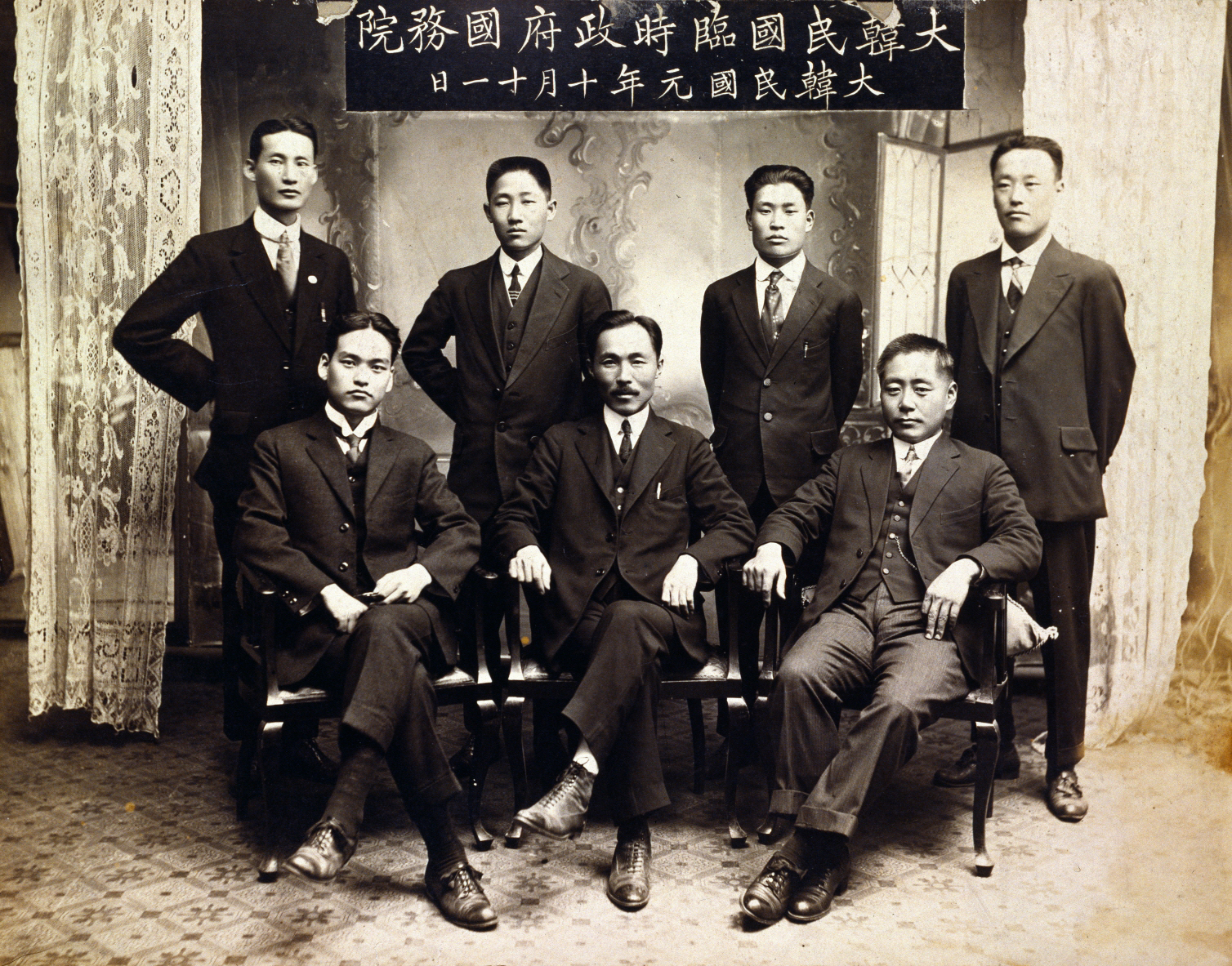
Early members of the Provisional Government of the Republic of Korea (1919)

After the repression of the 1 March Movement protests, Koreans fled the peninsula. A number of them congregated in Shanghai a month after the protests and founded a government-in-exile: the Korean Provisional Government (KPG). The government was highly diverse, with both left- and right-leaning members, and engaged in a range of political and militant efforts that advocated for Korea's independence. In 1931, member Kim Ku founded the Korean Patriotic Organization (KPO), a militant arm of the KPG. The KPO planned a number of attacks on Japanese government and colonial officials, including a 1932 assassination attempt on Emperor Hirohito and a bombing at a military rally in Shanghai.

After the Shanghai bombing, they were forced to flee the city, and eventually settled in Chongqing, where they received support from the Chinese government. There, Kim Ku, then the leader of the KPG, founded the Korean Liberation Army (KLA). The army fought in China and Burma, and prepared for its return to Korea as the tide of World War II turned against Japan. This culminated in the Eagle Project, a mission for the KPG and KLA to return to the peninsula and fight the Japanese. Ultimately, with the surprise of the atomic bomb droppings on Nagasaki and Hiroshima and the sudden end of the war, the mission did not come to pass.

=== Resistance within Korea ===
Within Korea itself, anti-Japanese rallies continued on multiple occasions. In 1926, the June Tenth Movement broke out in Keijō (Seoul) during the funeral of King Sunjong of Korea. Most notably, the Gwangju(Kōshū) Students Independence Movement on 3 November 1929 led to the strengthening of Japanese military rule in 1931, after which freedom of the press and freedom of expression were curbed. Many witnesses, including Catholic priests, reported that Japanese authorities dealt with insurgency severely. When villagers were suspected of hiding rebels, entire village populations are said to have been herded into public buildings (especially churches) and massacred when the buildings were set on fire. In the village of Teigan, Suigen District, Keiki Prefecture (now Jeam-ri, Hwaseong, Gyeonggi Province) for example, a group of 29 people were gathered inside a church which was then set afire.(Jeamni massacre)

On 10 December 1941, the Provisional Government of the Republic of Korea, under the presidency of Kim Ku, declared war on Japan and Germany.

== Independence and division of Korea ==
Following the dropping of atomic bombs on Hiroshima and Nagasaki, Soviet invasion of Manchuria, and the impending overrun of the Korean Peninsula by U.S. and Soviet forces, Japan surrendered to the Allied forces on 15 August 1945, ending 35 years of Japanese colonial rule, though Japanese troops remained in Southern Korea for several more weeks until fully withdrawing by mid-September.

American forces under General John R. Hodge arrived at the southern part of the Korean Peninsula on 8 September 1945, while the Soviet Army and some Korean Communists had stationed themselves in the northern part of the Korean Peninsula. U.S. Colonel Dean Rusk proposed to Chischakov, the Soviet military administrator of northern Korea, that Korea should be split at the 38th parallel. This proposal was made at an emergency meeting to determine postwar spheres of influence, which led to the division of Korea.

After the liberation of Korea from Japanese rule, the "Name Restoration Order" was issued on 23 October 1946 by the United States Army Military Government in Korea south of the 38th parallel, enabling Koreans to restore their names if they wished. Many Koreans in Japan chose to retain their Japanese names, either to avoid discrimination, or later, to meet the requirements for naturalization as Japanese citizens.

== Administrative divisions ==
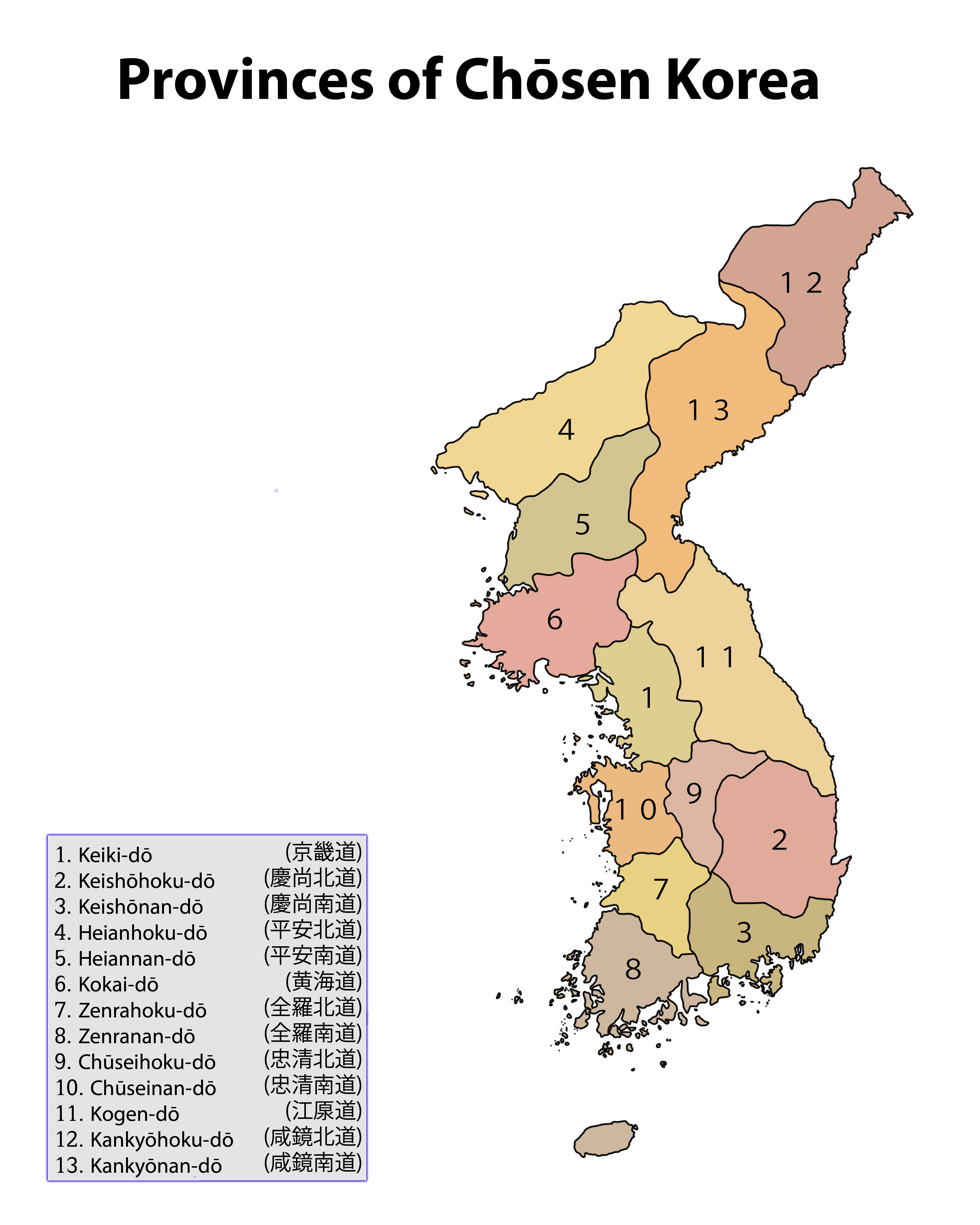
Provinces of Korea during Japanese rule

There were 13 provinces in Korea during Japanese rule: Keiki Province, Kōgen Province, Chūseihoku Province, Chūseinan Province, Zenrahoku Province, Zenranan Province, Keishōhoku Province, Keishōnan Province, Heian'nan Province, Heianhoku Province, Kōkai Province, Kankyōnan Province, and Kankyōhoku Province. The administrative capital Keijō was in Keiki Province.

== Economy ==
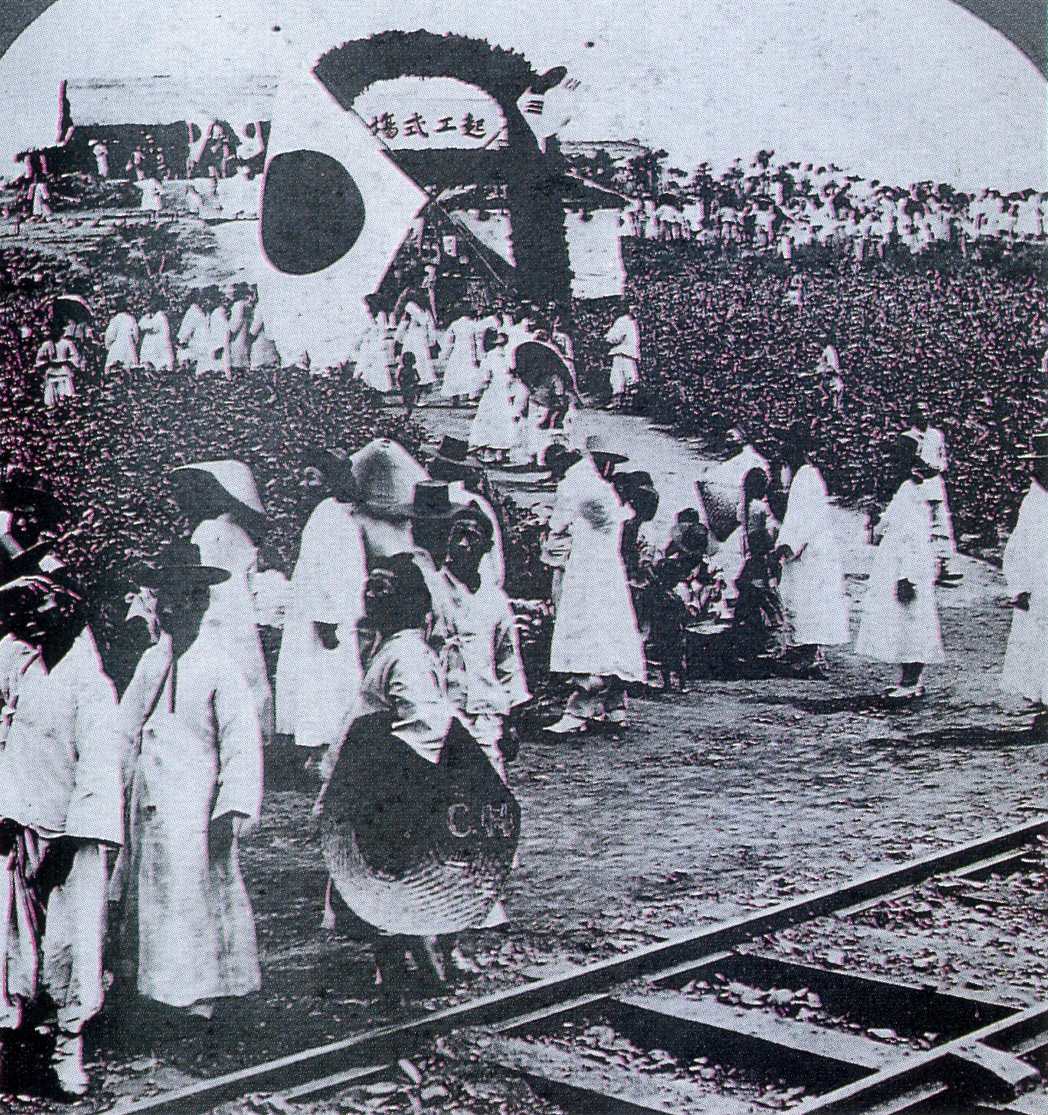
Groundbreaking ceremony for the Keijō–Fuzan railway

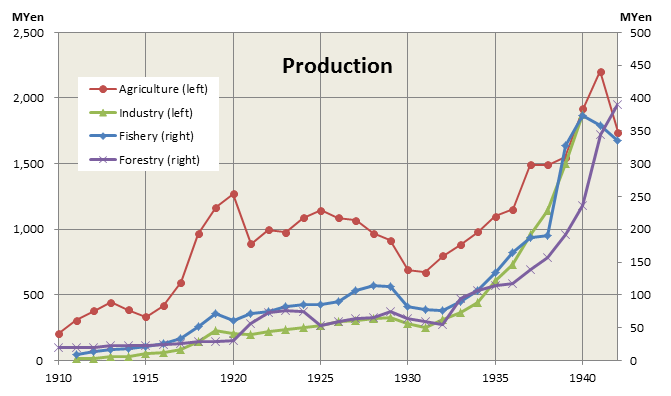
Production in Korea under Japanese rule

Industrialization of Korea under Japanese rule

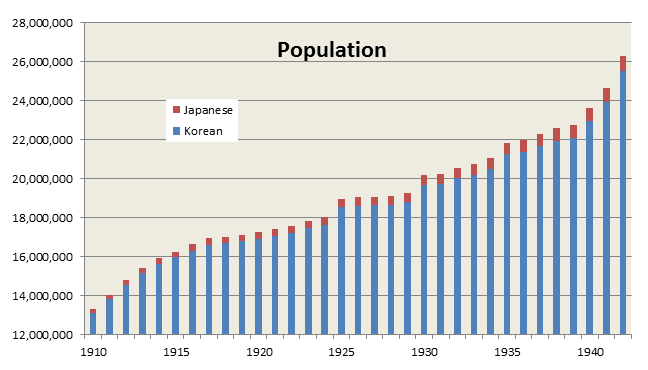
Population of Korea under Japanese rule

Km of railway in Korea under Japanese rule

Telephone subscribers in Korea under Japanese rule

Japan encouraged an inflow of Japanese capital to Korea's less developed economy. A large majority of major firms in Korea became Japanese owned and operated as a result, with key positions reserved for Japanese. Koreans were permitted to work in menial roles under harsh labor conditions. Most of Korea's coal, iron, and crop production was shipped to Japan.

Economic output in terms of agriculture, fishery, forestry and industry increased by tenfold from 1910 to 1945 as illustrated on the chart to the right. Princeton's Atul Kohli concluded that the economic development model the Japanese instituted played the crucial role in Korean economic development, a model that was maintained by the Koreans in the post-World War II era.

Randall S. Jones wrote that "economic development during the colonial period can be said to have laid the foundation for future growth in several respects".

A 2017 study found that the gradual removal of trade barriers (almost fully completed by 1923) after Japan's annexation of Korea "increased population growth rates more in the regions close to the former border between Japan and Korea than in the other regions. Furthermore, after integration, the regions close to Korea that specialized in the fabric industry, whose products were the primary goods exported from Japan to Korea, experienced more population growth than other regions close to Korea did."

There were some modernization efforts by the late 19th century prior to annexation. Seoul became the first city in East Asia to have electricity, trolley cars, water, telephone, and telegraph systems all at the same time, but Korea remained a largely backward agricultural economy around the start of the 20th century. "Japan's initial colonial policy was to increase agricultural production in Korea to meet Japan's growing need for rice. Japan also began to build large-scale industries in Korea in the 1930s as part of the empire-wide program of economic self-sufficiency and war preparation." In terms of exports, "Japanese industry as a whole gained little ... and this is certainly true for the most important manufacturing sector, cotton textiles. This export trade had little impact, positive or negative, on the welfare of Japanese consumer." Likewise in terms of the profitability of Japanese investors: colonial Korea made no significant impact.

According to scholar Donald S. Macdonald, "for centuries most Koreans lived as subsistence farmers of rice and other grains and satisfied most of their basic needs through their own labor or through barter. The manufactures of traditional Korea – principally cloth, cooking and eating utensils, furniture, jewelry, and paper – were produced by artisans in a few population centers."

During the early period of Japanese rule, the Japanese government attempted to completely integrate the Korean economy with Japan, and thus introduced many modern economic and social institutions and invested heavily in infrastructure, including schools, railroads and utilities. Most of these physical facilities remained in Korea after the Liberation. The Japanese government played an even more active role in developing Korea than it had played in developing the Japanese economy in the late nineteenth century. Many programs drafted in Korea in the 1920s and 1930s originated in policies drafted in Japan during the Meiji period (1868–1912). The Japanese government helped to mobilize resources for development and provided entrepreneurial leadership for these new enterprises. Colonial economic growth was initiated through powerful government efforts to expand the economic infrastructure, to increase investment in human capital through health and education and to raise productivity.

However, under Japanese rule, many Korean resources were only used for Japan. Economist Suh Sang-chul points out that the nature of industrialization during the period was as an "imposed enclave", so the impact of colonialism was trivial. Another scholar, Song Byung-nak, states that the economic condition of average Koreans deteriorated during the period despite the economic growth. Cha primarily attributed this deterioration to global economic shocks and laissez-faire policies, as well as Chōsen's rapid population growth; the colonial government's attempts to mitigate this problem were inadequate. Most Koreans at the time could access only a primary school education under restriction by the Japanese, and this prevented the growth of an indigenous entrepreneurial class. A 1939 statistic shows that among the total capital recorded by factories, about 94 percent was Japanese-owned. While Koreans owned about 61 percent of small-scale firms that had 5 to 49 employees, about 92 percent of large-scale enterprises with more than 200 employees were Japanese-owned.

Virtually all industries were owned either by Japan-based corporations or by Japanese corporations in Korea. As of 1942, indigenous capital constituted only 1.5 percent of the total capital invested in Korean industries. Korean entrepreneurs were charged interest rates 25 percent higher than their Japanese counterparts, so it was difficult for large Korean enterprises to emerge. More and more farmland was taken over by the Japanese, and an increasing proportion of Korean farmers either became sharecroppers or migrated to Japan or Manchuria as laborers. As greater quantities of Korean rice were exported to Japan, per capita consumption of rice among the Koreans declined; between 1932 and 1936, per capita consumption of rice declined to half the level consumed between 1912 and 1916. Although the government imported coarse grains from Manchuria to augment the Korean food supply, per capita consumption of food grains in 1944 was 35 percent below that of 1912 to 1916.

In addition, 70% of the agricultural workers who made up most of Korea's population at the time were reduced to tenants of Japanese and Korean landlords who purchased land at low prices, and they had to pay high rents of 50–70%. As a result, many Koreans left for Manchuria and settled down, becoming the foundation of Korean in China.

After 1927, the Government-General of Korea established the "Twelve-Year Railway Plan" in discussions with the Korean Private Railway Association. In addition to the existing Hamgyŏng Line and P'yŏngwŏn Line, new routes were constructed, such as the Domun, Hyesan, Manpo, Donghae, Gyeongjeon, and Paekmu Lines. This action aimed to facilitate the active development and efficient transportation of mineral resources distributed across northern Korea. During the Japanese colonial period, substantial progress was made in railway construction across the Korean Peninsula. Japan actively purchased privately owned railways and at the same time, established large-scale development plans. As the railroad network on the Korean Peninsula neared completion, the military railroad system intended by Japan for invasion of the continent and colonial control also took on an almost complete form.

The railways were intended for the transportation of war materials as well as for generating economic benefits from Joseon. The construction of railways was necessary for developing Korea's resource base, establishing the foundations of colonial governance, and expanding the regional economic infrastructure. Government-operated railways were implemented by the Government-General of Korea, while private railways were constructed by regional private railway companies. Through the development of Korea's resources, government-operated railways aimed to expand Japan's economic benefits and to consolidate the foundations of colonial governance. However, behind this initiative, there were continuous demands for railroad establishment by Japanese capitalists, centered around Japanese chambers of commerce seeking to expand economic benefits in Korea. Due to them, it was possible for the railway to be constructed.

The Japanese government created a system of colonial mercantilism, requiring construction of significant transportation infrastructure on the Korean Peninsula for the purpose of extracting and exploiting resources such as raw materials (timber), foodstuff (mostly rice and fish), and mineral resources (coal and iron ore). The Japanese developed port facilities and an extensive railway system which included a main trunk railway from the southern port city of Pusan through the capital of Seoul and north to the Chinese border. This infrastructure was intended not only to facilitate a colonial mercantilist economy, but was also viewed as a strategic necessity for the Japanese military to control Korea and to move large numbers of troops and materials to the Chinese border at short notice.

To transport war supplies to China, the Japanese Empire constructed railways not only from Busan to Seoul but also along the East Coast. On 1 December 1937, the Northern East Coast Line was opened with the purpose of exploiting underground resources in South and North Hamgyong Provinces and Gangwon Province to support Japanese war materials. This railway connected Yangyang and Wonsan for 14 years. And the operations continued until 1950, when they were suspended due to the Korean War. This line carried passenger cars as well as approximately 15 to 20 freight cars and it was primarily used to transport timber from the Yangyang area and iron mine from local mining facilities.

In the late 1920s, infrastructure that had been an obstacle to the development of Gangwon Province began to be constructed. In particular, there were changes in the transportation sector. Among five new national railway lines, the Donghae Line was planned to pass through the Yeongdong region of Gangwon Province. At that time, the Gangwon Provincial Office anticipated that if the entire East Coast line were completed, it would connect to Hamgyong Province, Busan, and even North Manchuria, significantly contributing to the economic development of Gangwon. During the 1930s, the desire for development also increased within local communities. Residents of Gangwon actively promoted railroad construction campaigns, emphasizing the necessity of building railroads. However, as previously mentioned, these efforts were primarily driven by Japanese capitalists operating in Korea.

According to materials released by the Donghae Cultural Center, economic exploitation was considerable along the eastern coast of Gangwon Province. Notes remain indicating the amounts of contributions paid in each region, and there are records showing that underground resources around Samcheok were exploited and transported out of the area. In 1939, an article in the Dong-A Ilbo reported that a railway was constructed to transport anthracite coal from Dokye to Mukho Port, where newly built facilities accommodated ships with a capacity of one thousand tons. At that time, photographs of Mukho Port, the Samcheok railway, and coal mines support this information. These materials indicate that economic exploitation and policies to obliterate the Korean nation were also carried out along the eastern coast of Gangwon during the Japanese colonial era.

Additionally, all these infrastructures were constructed by the Samcheok Development Company to transport Korean resources to Japan. Also there was the construction of the Samcheok Railway for coal transport. Mukho Port was developed for the shipment of resources from the Samcheok Railway to Japan, and the company established to extract resources in this area was the Samcheok Development company. It was established in April 1936 together with the Samcheok Railway Company. Specifically, the development of Samcheok focused on the anthracite coal fields, chemical industries that used mineral resources such as Samcheok coal like raw materials, and other enterprises related to development along the Samcheok Railway line. In particular, Samcheok coal was valued for improving the Japanese Empire's coal trade balance and for coping with domestic coal demand within Japan. This was because it helped Japan reduce its dependence on coal from Manchuria, China, and French territories and supply raw materials for various industries in both Japan and Korea. However, while some coal was transported to industrial areas in northern Korea, the majority was sent to areas of high demand such as Osaka, Nagoya, and Niigata in Japan. All of these enterprises were established with Japanese colonial capital.

In particular, the construction of railways in Hongcheon County, Gangwon Province, was led by Japanese politicians and enterprise groups. And the primary purpose is to secure economic privileges and extract resources. During this time, independence activists carried out activities such as the explosion of railway bridges to disrupt the Japanese resource extraction network. They showed an attitude toward the railway that differed from that of Japanese capitalists and merchants. Meanwhile, in Samcheok, which was rich in mineral resources intended for war materials, freight-only railway lines were constructed. The construction work in the railway was mobilized forced labor or the employment of workers at very low wages. Among the harsh railway laborers, there were slash-and-burn farmers and people from destitute poor who were mobilized for the work.

Korean railways are a product of an industrialization process that was designed to enable Japan's economic exploitation of Korea. Still, after the railroad network on the Korean Peninsula was established under Japanese rule, the movement of goods and human increased. Also, they had a significant impact on living environment in Korea. In other words, the railway network that Japan established in Korea was primarily developed for political and military purposes. While the railways served Japan's primary objectives of colonial governance and continental expansion, their fundamental functions of transporting food and raw materials and facilitating the export of goods and capital were also actively carried out. Korean railways functioned to directly link the economy of colonial Korea with imperial Japan.

From the late 1920s and into the 1930s, particularly during the tenure of Japanese Governor-General Kazushige Ugaki, concentrated efforts were made to build up the industrial base in Korea. This was especially true in the areas of heavy industry, such as chemical plants and steel mills, and munitions production. The Japanese military felt it would be beneficial to have production closer to the source of raw materials and closer to potential front lines for a future war with China.

Lee Young-hoon, a professor at Seoul National University states that less than 10% of arable land actually came under Japanese control and rice was normally traded, not robbed. He also insists that Koreans' knowledge about the era under Japanese rule is mostly made up by later educators. Many of Lee's arguments, however, have been contested.

In his book, The New Korea, British author Alleyne Ireland referred to conditions in Korea under Japanese rule in 1926.

Looking forward from 1910, one thing was clear where many things were obscure, namely that Japan, having decided to make Korea part of her Empire, would deem the permanence of her occupation to be a major element of her national policy, to be held intact, at whatever cost, against internal revolt or foreign intrigue. The Japanese refer with pride to their effective protection of life and property throughout a country but recently overrun by bandits, to the enormous increase during the past fifteen years in every branch of production, with its connotation of increased employment for Koreans, to the constantly mounting number of Koreans appointed to the government service are facts, that cannot be gainsaid. However, the Korean nationalists attribute to them a sinister significance.

=== Drug trade ===
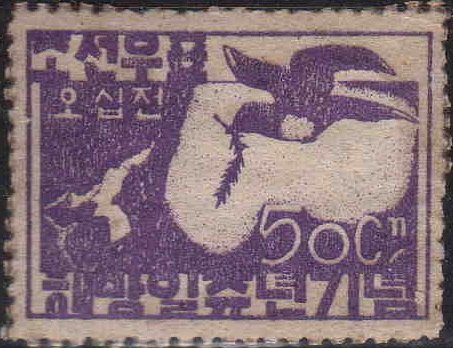
1946 saw the issue of commemorative stamps bearing the dove of peace celebrating the end of Japanese rule.

Korea produced a small amount of opium during the earlier years of the colonial period, but by the 1930s, Korea became a major exporter of both opium and narcotics, becoming a significant supplier to the illicit drug trade, specifically to the opium monopoly created by the Japanese-sponsored Manchukuo government. The Government-General developed facilities dedicated to the production of morphine and heroin. Emigrant Koreans played an extensive role in drug trafficking in China, especially in Manchuria, where they were employed as poppy farmers, drug peddlers, or proprietors of opium dens – disreputable jobs that were at the bottom rung of the drug trafficking ladder. The initiation of opium and narcotic production in Korea was motivated by the worldwide shortage of opium and Japan's unfavorable environment for poppy cultivation, making the Japanese entirely dependent on foreign imports to meet domestic demand for medical opium. The Japanese discovered that Korea provided favorable climate and soil conditions for poppy cultivation; not only were the climate and soil conditions more suitable, but land and labor costs were lower than in Japan. Farmers in Korea were aware of the global demand for opium, and welcomed the idea of increasing the amount of land for poppy cultivation, an idea that was introduced to them by Japanese pharmaceutical companies. The sale and consumption of drugs were pervasive in Korea, where the country faced a substantial domestic drug abuse problem, appearing in the form of opium-smoking and morphine addiction. Within Korea, most illicit narcotics were supplied by Japanese druggists.

== Policies ==
=== Motivation behind Japanese colonial policy ===
In Japan, attitudes toward Koreans were deeply shaped by the Nissen dōsoron (日鮮同祖論, "Theory of Japanese-Korean Common Ancestry"), which claimed Koreans and Japanese shared mythological ancestors: Susanoo (Koreans) and Amaterasu (Japanese). According to this theory, Koreans were inherently Japanese. This idea served as the ideological foundation for the colonial government's assimilation policies, which aimed to fully incorporate Koreans as "racial Japanese."

In a speech in February 1944, Governor-General Koiso used the Nihon Shoki to justify the campaign to erase Korean language, culture, and ethnic identity. He asserted that Koreans were descendants of Susanoo-no-Mikoto, younger brother of Amaterasu, the sun goddess and ancestral figure of the Japanese emperor and nation. According to the Nihon Shoki, Susanoo had been sent to Korea to rule, a narrative Koiso used to suggest Susanoo was the same figure as Dangun, Korea's mythical founder. He further argued that Korea's annexation in 1910 mirrored the "divine land transfer" (Kuni-yuzuri), where Susanoo's descendant, Ōkuninushi, submitted to Ninigi, Amaterasu's grandson, establishing a precedent for the subordination of Koreans (Susanoo's descendants) to Japanese (Amaterasu's descendants). Koiso frequently made use of wording that hoped for the colonial policy to help "awaken" Koreans to their "true nature" as Japanese.

Assimilation, however, did not mean equality. Koreans were to remain subordinate, as theorized by Imaizumi Teisuke, who compared the Japanese-Korean relationship to hierarchical bonds like man and woman, rider and horse. This religious ideology also explained the construction of Shinto shrines across Korea during wartime, seen as completing a divine ritual to secure Japan's destiny.

As opposed to other occupied countries, Koreans were nominally granted Japanese citizenship, including passports, but they were denied basic rights like freedom of speech, assembly, and an independent press. By 1910, all Korean publications were banned, leaving only censored outlets run by the colonial government. Japan's ultimate goal was to erase Korean identity entirely, making Koreans indistinguishable from the Japanese, much like the assimilation policies directed at the Ainu and Okinawans. However, modern research confirms that Korean remains distinct and unrelated to Japanese or other languages.

=== Newspaper censorship ===
In 1907, the Resident-General of Korea passed the Newspaper Act, which effectively prevented the publication of local papers. Only the English-language The Korea Daily News and its Korean-language counterpart Daehan Maeil Sinbo continued their publication, because they were run by the foreigner Ernest Bethell. However, after continued Japanese pressure on the paper's staff and Bethell's death in 1909, even these papers became owned by the Japanese government. The newspaper's Korean-language successor, Maeil Sinbo, was subordinated to the Japanese-language Keijō Nippō. These two papers, along with the English-language newspaper The Seoul Press, were effectively backed by the colonial government. Concurrently, the colonial government published an official gazette, entitled the Government-General of Chōsen Gazette.

By 1910, the only major privately owned Korean newspaper allowed to publish was the Gyeongnam Ilbo. However, this paper was pressured to close by 1915, leaving only the Maeil Sinbo left. However, restrictions were eased upon the 1919 March First Movement and the cultural rule policy, which led to the establishment of the historic Korean papers The Chosun Ilbo and The Dong-A Ilbo.

In 1932, Japan relaxed restrictions on the publication of Korean newspapers. Despite this, the government continued to seize newspapers without warning; there are over a thousand recorded seizures between 1920 and 1939. Revocation of publishing rights was relatively rare, and only three magazines had their rights revoked over the entire colonial period. In 1940, as the Pacific War increased in intensity, Japan shut down all Korean language newspapers again.

=== Education ===
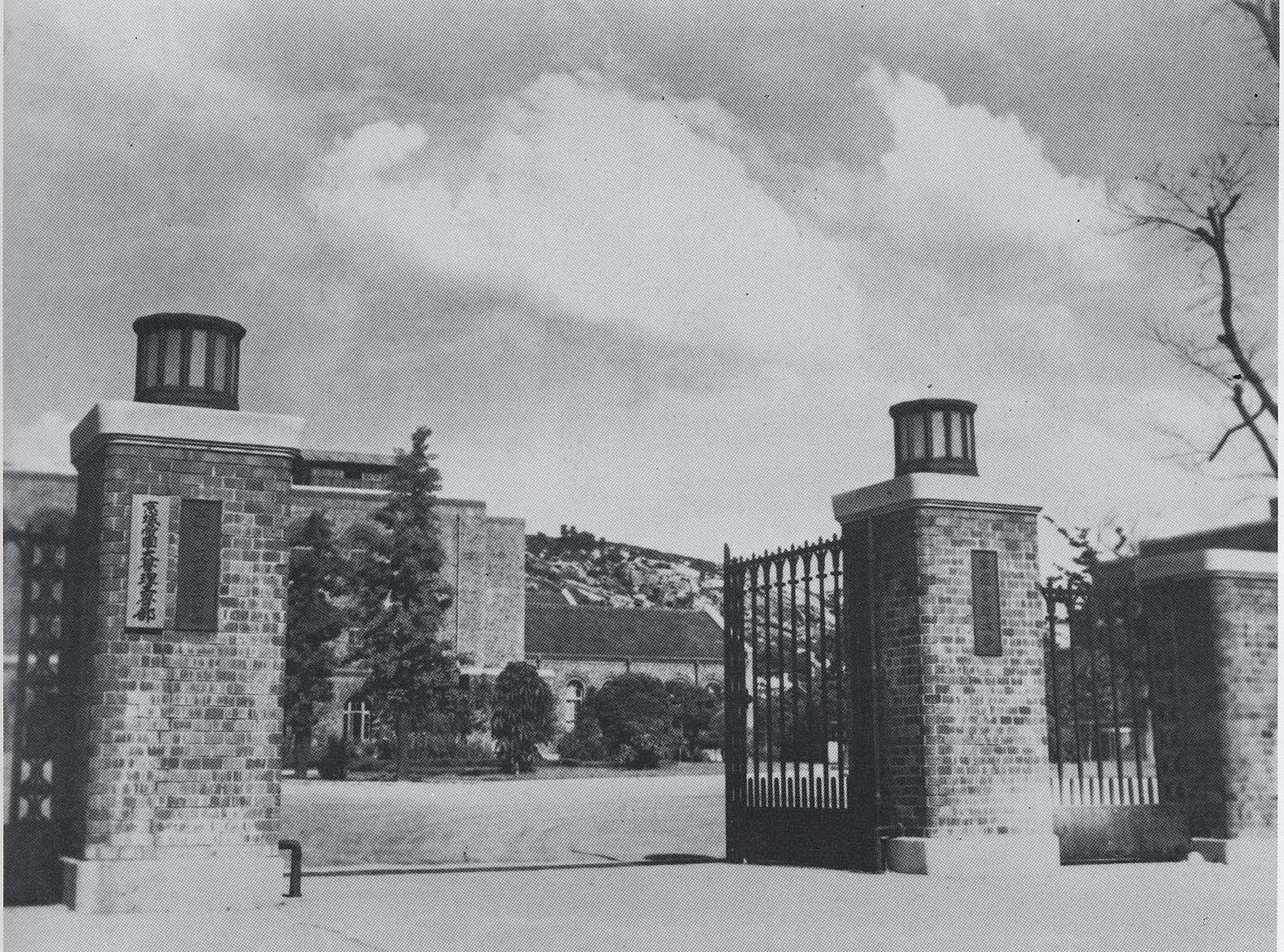
Keijō Imperial University

Number of public regular schools (公立普通学校) and students under Japanese rule

Enrollment rate of public regular schools (公立普通学校) under Japanese rule

Following the annexation of Korea, the Japanese administration introduced a public education system modeled after the Japanese school system with a pyramidal hierarchy of elementary, middle and high schools, culminating at the Keijō Imperial University in Keijō. As in Japan itself, education was viewed primarily as an instrument of "the Formation of the Imperial Citizen" (황민화; 皇民化; Kōminka) with a heavy emphasis on moral and political instruction. Japanese religious groups such as Protestant Christians willingly supported the Japanese authorities in their effort to assimilate Koreans through education.

During colonial times, elementary schools were known as "Citizen Schools" (국민학교; 国民学校; kokumin gakkō) as in Japan, as a means of forming proper "Imperial Citizens" (황국민; 皇国民; kōkokumin) from early childhood. Elementary schools in South Korea today are known by the name chodeung hakgyo (초등학교; 初等學校) ("elementary school") as the term gukmin hakgyo/kokumin gakkō has recently become a politically incorrect term.

During the colonial period, Japan established an officially equal educational system in Korea, but it strictly limited the rate of coed education. After the Korean Educational Ordinance was published in 1938, this situation changed slightly. "Primary education consisted of a mandated four years of primary school (futsu gakkō). Secondary education included four years of middle school for boys (koto futsu gakkō) and three years for girls (joshi koto futsu gakko) or two to three years of vocational school (jitsugyo gakkō). 1915, the Japanese announced the Regulations for Technical Schools (senmon gakko kisoku), which legalized technical schools (senmon gakkō) as post-secondary educational institutions."

In addition, modernized (for the time) Korean educational institutions were excluded from the colonial system. 1911, Japanese government set The Regulations for Private Schools (Shiritsu gakko kisoku) aimed at undermining these facilities which were believed to breed Korean patriotism.

The public curriculum for most of the period was taught by Korean educators under a hybrid system focused on assimilating Koreans into the Japanese Empire while emphasizing Korean cultural education. This focused on the history of the Japanese Empire as well as inculcating reverence for the Imperial House of Japan and instruction in the Imperial Rescript on Education.

Integration of Korean students into Japanese-language schools and Japanese students in Korean-language schools was discouraged but steadily increased over time. While official policy promoted equality between ethnic Koreans and ethnic Japanese, in practice this was rarely the case. Korean history and language studies would be taught side by side with Japanese history and language studies until the early 1940s under a new education ordinance that saw wartime efforts increased and the hybrid system slowly weakened.

Academic Status of under Japanese rule in 1944
Academic ability	Population	%
University	7,374	0.03%
Vocational school	22,064	0.1%
Middle & high school	199,642	0.9%
elementary school	1,941,789	8.5%
temporary school & Seodang	980,122	4.3%
Uneducated	19,642,775	86.2%
Total	22,793,766	100%

One point of view is that, although the Japanese education system in Korea was detrimental towards Korea's cultural identity, its introduction of public education as universal was a step in the right direction to improve Korea's human capital. Towards the end of Japanese rule, Korea saw elementary school attendance at 38 percent. Children of elite families were able to advance to higher education, while others were able to attend technical schools, allowing for "the emergence of a small but important class of well-educated white collar and technical workers ... who possessed skills required to run a modern industrial economy." The Japanese education system ultimately produced hundreds of thousands of educated South Koreans who later became "the core of the postwar political and economic elite".

Another point of view is that it was only after the end of Japanese rule with World War II that Korea saw true, democratic rise in public education as evidenced by the rise of adult literacy rate from 22 percent in 1945 to 87.6 percent by 1970 and 93% by the late 1980s. Though public education was made available for elementary schools during Japanese rule, Korea as a country did not experience secondary-school enrollment rates comparable to those of Japan prior to the end of World War II.

For example, according to the statistics of the Japanese Government-General of Korea in 1944, which was prepared just before independence, only 8.5% of the total population entered elementary school, and the middle school enrollment rate was only 0.9%. The literacy rate was also very low, so only 30% of the population could read letters, compared to a sharp rise to 90% in 1955, 10 years after independence.

=== Korean language ===
In the initial phase of Japanese rule, students were taught in Korean in public schools established by ethnic Korean officials who worked for the colonial government. Prior to this period, Korean education relied heavily on Hanja, Chinese characters, for written communication. However, during this time the Korean language transitioned to a mixed Hanja–Korean script influenced by the Japanese writing system, where most lexical roots were written in Hanja and grammatical forms in Korean script. Korean textbooks from this era included excerpts from traditional Korean stories such as Heungbu and Nolbu (興夫伝; Kōfuden).

In 1921, government efforts were strengthened to promote Korean media and literature throughout Korea and also in Japan. The Japanese government also created incentives to educate ethnic Japanese students in the Korean language. In 1928, the Korean Language Society inaugurated Hangul Day (9 October), which was meant to celebrate the Korean alphabet in the face of accelerating Japanization of Korean culture.

Koreans were obliged to take Japanese names by 1932.

In 1933, the foundation of modern South and North Korean spelling was completed.

The Japanese administrative policy shifted more aggressively towards cultural assimilation in 1938 (Naisen ittai) with a new government report advising reform to strengthen the war effort. Under this influence, in 1940, all Korean newspapers except the Japanese government's official newspaper were eliminated. In 1942, Japanese authorities caused the Korean Language Society Incident and closed the society by applying suspicion of rebellion to scholars.

This left less room for Korean language studies and by 1943 all Korean language courses had been phased out. Teaching and speaking of Korean was prohibited. Although the government report advised further, more radical reform, the 10-year plan would never fully go into effect.

=== Taking of historical artifacts ===
The Japanese rule of Korea also resulted in the relocation of tens of thousands of cultural artifacts to Japan. This removal of Korean cultural property was against a long tradition of such actions dating at least since the sixteenth century wars between Korea and Japan, though in the 20th century colonial period it was a systematised and regulated activity covered by rules issued 1916–1933.

The issue over where these artifacts should be located began during the U.S. occupation of Japan. In 1965, as part of the Treaty on Basic Relations between Japan and the Republic of Korea, Japan returned roughly 1,400 artifacts to Korea, and considered the diplomatic matter to have been resolved. Korean artifacts are retained in the Tōkyō National Museum and in the hands of many private collectors.

The primary building of Gyeongbokgung Palace was demolished and the Japanese General Government Building was built in its exact location. The Japanese colonial authorities destroyed 85 percent of all the buildings in Gyeongbokgung. Sungnyemun, the gate in Gyeongsong that was a symbol of Korea, was altered by the addition of large, Shinto-style golden horns near the roofs, later removed by the South Korean government after independence.

According to the South Korean government, there are 75,311 cultural artifacts that were taken from Korea. Japan has 34,369, the United States has 17,803, and France had several hundred, which were seized in the French campaign against Korea and loaned back to Korea in 2010 without an apology. In 2010, Prime Minister of Japan Naoto Kan expressed "deep remorse" for the removal of artifacts, and arranged an initial plan to return the Royal Protocols of the Joseon Dynasty and over 1,200 other books, which was carried out in 2011.

=== Religion ===
As Japan established the puppet state of Manchukuo, Korea became more vital to the internal communications and defense of the Japanese empire against the Soviet Union. Japan decided in the 1930s to make the Koreans become more loyal to the Emperor by requiring Korean participation in the State Shinto devotions, and by weakening the influences of both Christianity and traditional religion.

Shinto shrines were established throughout the peninsula, including Chōsen Shrine on the mountain Namsan in Seoul and Heijō Shrine in Pyongyang. Shrines such as these were destroyed shortly after Korea was liberated in 1945.

==== Christianity and Communism ====
Christianity had been present in Korea in Catholic form as early as the late 18th century; Korean Catholics were subjected to several rounds of persecution by the Joseon government, culminating in the Catholic Persecution of 1866 (which lasted until 1872). Many of those executed during these persecutions – including a number of French clerics – have since been canonized or beatified by the Catholic Church. After the end of Joseon Korea's policy of isolation, persecution of Korean Catholics largely ceased. Protestant Christianity would not enter Korea until the late 19th century with the significant expansion of Protestant missionary activity in Asia in the 19th century. American Presbyterians and Methodists arrived in the 1880s – after the end of the Joseon government's persecution of Catholics (and the end of Joseon Korea's isolationism with treaties such as the Joseon-United States Treaty of 1882) – and were well received. In 1914, out of 16 million people, there were 86,000 Protestants and 79,000 Catholics; by 1934 the numbers were 168,000 and 147,000. Presbyterian missionaries were especially successful.

During both the end of the Joseon era and the Japanese imperial era, harmonizing with traditional practices became an issue. Catholics, who had been persecuted during Joseon's isolation for rejecting Confucian ancestor worship practices, tolerated Shinto rites; Protestants developed a substitute for Confucian ancestral rites by merging Confucian-based and Christian death and funerary rituals. During the Japanese colonial period, Christianity became an expression of Korean nationalist opposition to Japan and its assimilation policies.

Japan began requiring the worship of the Emperor at the numerous Shinto shrines set up across the peninsula to bolster patriotism and national unity in 1937, which had become official Imperial government policy in Japan by 1931, complete with enforcement through persecution of traditionalist Shinto priests who did not comply. The Propaganda Fide of the Catholic Church permitted this practice in 1936, announcing that visits to these shrines had "only a purely civil value". The Presbyterian Church in Korea did not acquiesce to this practice until 1938, but was followed in this decision by other denominations such as the Methodists. Fewer than a dozen Protestant pastors refused this practice and were imprisoned. In total, around 2000 Christians were imprisoned and 50 were martyred. The vast majority of Korean Christians followed the guidance of their denominational leaders to engage in this practice.

Communist activity, particularly among Korean independence activists, alarmed Christian missionaries as early as the 1920s. With the enactment of the Peace Preservation Law in 1925, communist literature was banned throughout the Empire of Japan, including Korea. In order to avoid suspicion, evade this and similar statutes, and permit dissemination, Communist/socialist literature was often disguised as Christian literature addressed to missionaries. Communist concepts, such as class struggle, and its partner nationalist movement, were resonating well with some of the peasants and lower-class citizens of Korea; this was worrying to some missionaries because of communism's atheist elements. At one point, communist students in Seoul (named Keijō during Japanese administration) held an "anti-Sunday School conference" and loudly protested religion in front of churches. This protest renewed Japanese governmental interest in censorship of communist ideas and language.

=== Settlers ===
Under Japanese rule, the Japanese government encouraged Japanese settlers to move to Korea. As time went on and the presence of the Japanese became more established, separate segregated districts were established in cities meant for Japanese and Koreans. In Japanese districts in the cities, Japanese settlers had little contact with Koreans; while in the rural areas contact with them was more common. The Japanese tried to hold onto their lifestyle in Korea. Japanese settlers were a minority of the population in Korea. In 1943 there 758,595 Japanese people living in Korea making up 2.86% of the population. For most settlers Korean was rarely spoken and mostly spoke in Japanese instead.

== Legacy ==
=== Korean diaspora ===
A number of groups in the Korean diaspora formed because of the Japanese colonial period. Zainichi Koreans descend from the population of around 600,000 Koreans who remained in Japan, often not by choice. After Sakhalin was transferred from Japan to the Soviet Union, most of the 43,000 ethnic Koreans there were refused permission to repatriate back to Japan or Korea, and were thus trapped in Sakhalin. Many remained stateless. They now form the Sakhalin Korean population. Many Koreans had also escaped to Russia and the Soviet Union because of Japanese activities, and were eventually forced to move to Central Asia in 1937. They became a part of the population of Koryo-saram throughout the former Soviet Union.

=== Forced laborers, comfort women, and Unit 731 ===
During World War II, about 450,000 Korean male laborers were involuntarily sent to Japan. Comfort women, who served in Japanese military brothels as a form of sexual slavery, came from all over the Japanese empire. Historical estimates range from 10,000 to 200,000, including an unknown number of Koreans. However, 200,000 is considered to be a conservative number by modern historians, and up to 500,000 comfort women are estimated to have been taken. These women faced an average of 29 men and up to 40 men per day, according to one surviving comfort woman. However, of the 500,000, less than 50 are alive today. Comfort women were often recruited from rural locales with the promise of factory employment; business records, often from Korean subcontractees of Japanese companies, showed them falsely classified as nurses or secretaries. There is evidence that the Japanese government intentionally destroyed official records regarding comfort women.

Koreans, along with many other Asians, were experimented on in Unit 731, a secret military medical experimentation unit in World War II. The victims who died in the camp included at least 25 victims from the former Soviet Union and Korea. Some historians estimate up to 250,000 total people were subjected to human experiments. A Unit 731 veteran attested that most of those who were experimented on were Chinese, Koreans, and Mongolians.

The Tokyo trials convened on 29 April 1946 to try Japanese personnel on Class A, B, and C charges for crimes against peace, conventional war crimes, and crimes against humanity respectively. Class C was created mainly to address atrocities committed by Japan against its nationals or allied citizens in times of peace or war since the law of war only covers enemy and neutral nationals in interstate armed conflicts. However, the principal Allied powers never pressed on the Class C charges as they did not want to risk their own colonial atrocities being subject to prosecution. This left the Korean and Taiwanese victims of Japanese colonial atrocities without any recourse in the international legal system.

In 2002, South Korea started an investigation of Japanese collaborators. Part of the investigation was completed in 2006 and a list of names of individuals who profited from exploitation of fellow Koreans were posted. The collaborators not only benefited from exploiting their countrymen, but the children of these collaborators benefited further by acquiring higher education with the exploitation money they had amassed.

The "Truth Commission on Forced Mobilization under the Japanese Imperialism Republic of Korea" investigated the received reports of damage from 86 people among the 148 Koreans who were accused of being Class B and C criminals while serving as prison guards for the Japanese military during World War II. The commission, which was organized by the South Korean government, announced that they acknowledged 83 people among them as victims. The commission said that although the people reluctantly served as guards to avoid the draft, they took responsibility for the mistreatment by the Japanese against prisoners of war. Lee Se-il, leader of the investigation, said that examination of the military prosecution reports for 15 Korean prison guards, obtained from The National Archives of the United Kingdom, confirmed that they were convicted without explicit evidence.

=== Korean to Japanese name change order ===
Although officially voluntary, and initially resisted by the Japanese Colonial Government, 80% of Koreans voluntarily changed their name to Japanese in 1940. Many community leaders urged the adoption of Japanese names to make it easy for their children to succeed in society and overcome discrimination.

A study conducted by the United States Library of Congress states that "the Korean culture was quashed, and Koreans were required to speak Japanese and take Japanese names". This name change policy, called sōshi-kaimei (창씨개명; 創氏改名), was part of Japan's assimilation efforts. This was heavily resisted by the Korean people. Those Koreans who retained their Korean names were not allowed to enroll at school, were refused service at government offices, and were excluded from the lists for food rations and other supplies. Faced with such compulsion, many Koreans ended up complying with the name change order. Such a radical policy was deemed to be symbolically significant in the war effort, binding the fate of Korea with that of the empire.

=== Discrimination against Korean leprosy patients by Japan ===
Colonial Korea was subject to the same Leprosy Prevention Laws of 1907 and 1931 as the Japanese home islands. These laws directly and indirectly permitted the quarantine of patients in sanitariums, where forced abortions and sterilization were common. The laws authorized punishment of patients "disturbing the peace", as most Japanese leprologists believed that vulnerability to the disease was inheritable. In Korea, many leprosy patients were also subjected to hard labor. The Japanese government compensated inpatients.

=== Atomic bomb casualties ===
Many Koreans were drafted for work at military industrial factories in Hiroshima and Nagasaki. According to the secretary-general of a group named Peace Project Network, "there were a total of 70,000 Korean victims in both cities". Japan paid South Korea 4 billion yen and built a welfare center in the name of humanitarian assistance, not as compensation to the victims.

=== Strong hierarchy including about age in South Korea ===
Before the Japanese colonial rule, until the Joseon dynasty era, age hierarchy was not so severe; it was a common custom to make friends within a small age gap. Today's South Korean strong age hierarchy is a remnant of the colonial rule by Japan. The Empire of Japan's normal schools (師範学校 shihan gakkou) are the very origin of age hierarchy in South Korea.

During the Meiji Restoration, the normal schools of the Empire of Japan adopted an educational method combining modern Western-style school curricula with a military-style regimen that emphasized group discipline, national loyalty, and obedience to elders, all to mold Japanese subjects who would voluntarily submit to the Emperor of Japan. This synthetic educational structure entailed the discipline and supervision of junior-grade students by their seniors in a military manner. The system was imported to the Korean Peninsula when it was annexed by Japan in 1910. Gyeongseong (Keijō) Normal School (경성사범학교) was one such Korean educational institution during the Japanese occupation period to adopt this military-style disciplinary system, whereby older students had the authority to monitor the behavior of younger students and even inflict corporal punishment on them. In some cases, older Korean students were even allowed to impose corporal punishment on their younger Japanese peers. Considering that Koreans suffered oppression and discrimination from the Japanese, the Governor-General of Chōsen, and the Japanese government during the Japanese colonial period, this case demonstrates how powerful the age-based hierarchy was in modern Japanese schools before 1945.

With the defeat of the Empire of Japan in 1945 and the establishment of the US military headquarters (GHQ) in Japan, the disbandment of the Japanese military, and the comprehensive overhaul of the Japanese educational system, hierarchical order in Japanese society weakened, and age-based hierarchy became mild or disappeared.

However, since Park Chung-hee, who served in the military of Manchukuo, a puppet state of the Empire of Japan, became president, South Korea has reinforced the severe age hierarchy that has been carried over from Japanese rule. For example, the Park Chung-hee administration published and disseminated the National Charter of Education (국민교육헌장), which benchmarked the Imperial Rescript on Education of the Empire of Japan. This, combined with the Confucian tradition of venerating elders, has led to the current severe age hierarchy and other bad hierarchical practices in South Korean society.

This bad hierarchical system, imported during the Japanese colonial period and maintained and strengthened by Park Chung-hee, affected not only the age hierarchy but also middle school, high school, university, and work culture. As a representative example, in middle and high schools, there is one thing where students are asked to form a military-style line. When living in society, there are bosses who force military-style language at work. In fact, the South Korean military has already abolished this military-style language.

=== South Korean presidential investigation commission on pro-Japanese collaborators ===
Collaborators of the Imperial Japanese Army were prosecuted in the postwar period as Chinilpa, or "friendly to Japanese". In 2006 South Korean president Roh Moo-hyun appointed an investigation commission into the issue of locating descendants of pro-Japanese collaborators from the times of the 1890s until the collapse of Japanese rule in 1945.

In 2010, the commission concluded its five-volume report. As a result, the land property of 168 South Korean citizens has been confiscated by the government, these citizens being descendants of pro-Japanese collaborators.

=== Memorials ===
A number of memorials cover the legacy of the Japanese colonial period. The Independence Hall of Korea in Cheonan, Museum of Japanese Colonial History in Korea in Seoul, and the National Memorial Museum of Forced Mobilization under Japanese Occupation in Busan all cover the subject. The Trail of National Humiliation in Seoul passes by a number of the former sites of colonial-era buildings.

=== Modern justification of the colonization ===
Some conservative Japanese nationalists have since attempted to more positively portray the colonization and Japan's intentions. Claims such as "Japan did not want to annex Korea" and "Koreans came to Japan and asked to be annexed" have been forwarded, and efforts are made to highlight Korea's economic development during this period. However, the scholar Mark Caprio writes skeptically of such viewpoints:

While acknowledging that Japanese policy benefited pockets of Korean society, a responsible argument must also acknowledge that Japan's colonial policies systematically excluded the majority of Koreans from these institutions of modernity. Reliance on a minority sample to explain the entirety of Japan's colonial rule grossly neglects the fact that Japan's administrative decisions forced a large number of participants to act against their volition... [N]eo-conservatives neglect to consider that Japan's history of expansion in East Asia did not end with the emperor's declaration on August 15, 1945, nor did it end with treaties of normalization. This history lives within the people it affected. Denial and beautification of this history disturbs the efforts of its surviving victims to distance themselves from this past, and serves as a painful reminder of Japan's unwillingness to accept responsibility for the injustices that Japanese rule inflicted upon them.

== List of governors-general of Korea ==
- Terauchi Masatake (1910–1916)
- Hasegawa Yoshimichi (1916–1919)
- Saitō Makoto (1929–1931)
- Kazushige Ugaki (1931–1936)
- Yamanashi Hanzō (1927–1929)
- Jirō Minami (1936–1942)
- Kuniaki Koiso (1942–1944)
- Nobuyuki Abe (1944–1945)

== In popular culture ==
- Madam Oh, 1965 South Korean film
- Sea of Blood, 1971 North Korean opera
- The Flower Girl, 1972 North Korean film
- Tell O' The Forest!, 1972 North Korean opera
- Femme Fatale: Bae Jeong-ja, 1973 South Korean film
- Mulberry, 1986 South Korean film
- Modern Boy, 2008 South Korean film
- Capital Scandal, 2008 South Korea TV drama
- The Good, the Bad, the Weird, 2008 South Korea film
- My Way, 2011 South Korean film
- Bridal Mask, 2012 South Korean TV drama
- Assassination, 2015 South Korean film
- The Silenced, 2015 South Korean film
- The Tiger, 2015 South Korean Film
- Spirits' Homecoming, 2016 South Korean film
- The Handmaiden, 2016 South Korean film
- The Last Princess, 2016 South Korean film
- The Age of Shadows, 2016 South Korean film
- Love Lies, 2016 South Korean film
- Chicago Typewriter, 2017 South Korean TV show
- Battleship Island, 2017 South Korean film
- Anarchist from Colony, 2017 South Korean film
- Mr. Sunshine, 2018 South Korean TV show
- Pachinko, 2017 novel by Min Jin Lee
- The Hymn of Death, 2018 South Korean TV show
- Different Dreams, 2019 South Korean TV show
- The Battle: Roar to Victory, 2019 South Korean film
- A Resistance, 2019 South Korean film
- Whale Star: The Gyeongseong Mermaid, 2019 webtoon by Na Yoonhee
- Beasts of a Little Land, 2021 novel by Juhea Kim
- Pachinko, 2022 Apple TV+ drama
- Tale of the Nine-Tailed 1938, 2023
- 100 Days of Deception, 2026 South Korean TV show

== See also ==
- Hashima Island
- History of Korea
- Japan–Korea disputes
- Japanese war crimes
- Sōshi-kaimei
- Taiwan under Japanese rule
