= List of South Korean films of 1986 =

A list of films produced in South Korea in 1986:

Title	Director	Cast	Genre	Notes
1986
Gilsoddeum	Im Kwon-taek			Entered into the 36th Berlin International Film Festival
Lee Jang-ho's Baseball Team	Lee Jang-ho	Ahn Sung-ki; Lee Bo-hee		
Jung-kwang's Nonsense	Kim Soo-yong			
Mulberry/Ppong	Lee Doo-yong	Lee Mi-sook; Lee Dae-kun		
Night Fairy	Nam Ki-nam	Choi Myung-gil		
Seoul Jesus	Jang Sun-woo			
Ticket	Im Kwon-taek			
Ureme 1	Kim Cheong-gi	Shim Hyung-rae		
Ureme 2	Kim Cheong-gi	Shim Hyung-rae		
A Wanderer In Winter	Kwak Ji-kyoon			
