= List of South Korean films of 1988 =

A list of films produced in South Korea in 1988:

Title	Director	Cast	Genre	Notes
1988
The Age of Success	Jang Sun-woo			
America America	Jang Kil-soo			
Chilsu and Mansu	Park Kwang-su	Ahn Sung-ki		
Prostitute	Yu Jin-seon	Na Young-hee; Ma Heung-shik		
Sa Bangji	Song Kyung-shik			
Ureme 5	Kim Cheong-gi	Shim Hyung-rae		
You My Rose Mellow	Park Chul-soo			
