= List of South Korean films of 1987 =

A list of films produced in South Korea in 1987:

| Title | Director | Cast | Genre | Notes |
|---|---|---|---|---|
1987
| Adada | Im Kwon-taek | Shin Hye-soo | | |
| Diary of King Yeonsan | Im Kwon-taek | Yu In-chon | | Best Film at the Grand Bell Awards |
| Highway (The Expressway) | Lee Doo-yong | Choi Jae-sung; Cho Yong-Won; Kim Jeong-Ah | | |
| Hello, God! | Bae Chang-ho | | | |
| Lethe's Love Song | Jang Kil-soo | | | |
| The Man with Three Coffins | Lee Jang-ho | Kim Myung-gon; Lee Bo-hee | | |
| Mimi and Chulsoo's Adolescence Sketch | Lee Kyu-hyung | | | |
| Mountain Strawberries 3 | Kim Su-hyeong | Seonu Il-ran | Ero | |
| Now We Are Going To Geneva | Song Young-soo | | | |
| Pillar of Mist | Park Chul-soo | Choi Myung-gil | | Best Film at the Grand Bell Awards |
| Our Sweet Days of Youth | Bae Chang-ho | | | |
| The Surrogate Woman | Im Kwon-taek | Kang Soo-yeon | | |
| Ureme 3 | Kim Cheong-gi | Shim Hyung-rae | | |
| Ureme 4 | Kim Cheong-gi | Shim Hyung-rae | | |
