= Yonggary =

Yonggary or Yongary may refer to:

- Yonggary (character), a South Korean kaiju (giant monster)
- Yongary, Monster from the Deep, a 1967 South Korean-Japanese kaiju film, introducing the character
- Yonggary (1999 film), a South Korean kaiju film by Kim Ki-duk, remake of the 1967 film
