= Trail of National Humiliation =

Trail in Seoul, South Korea

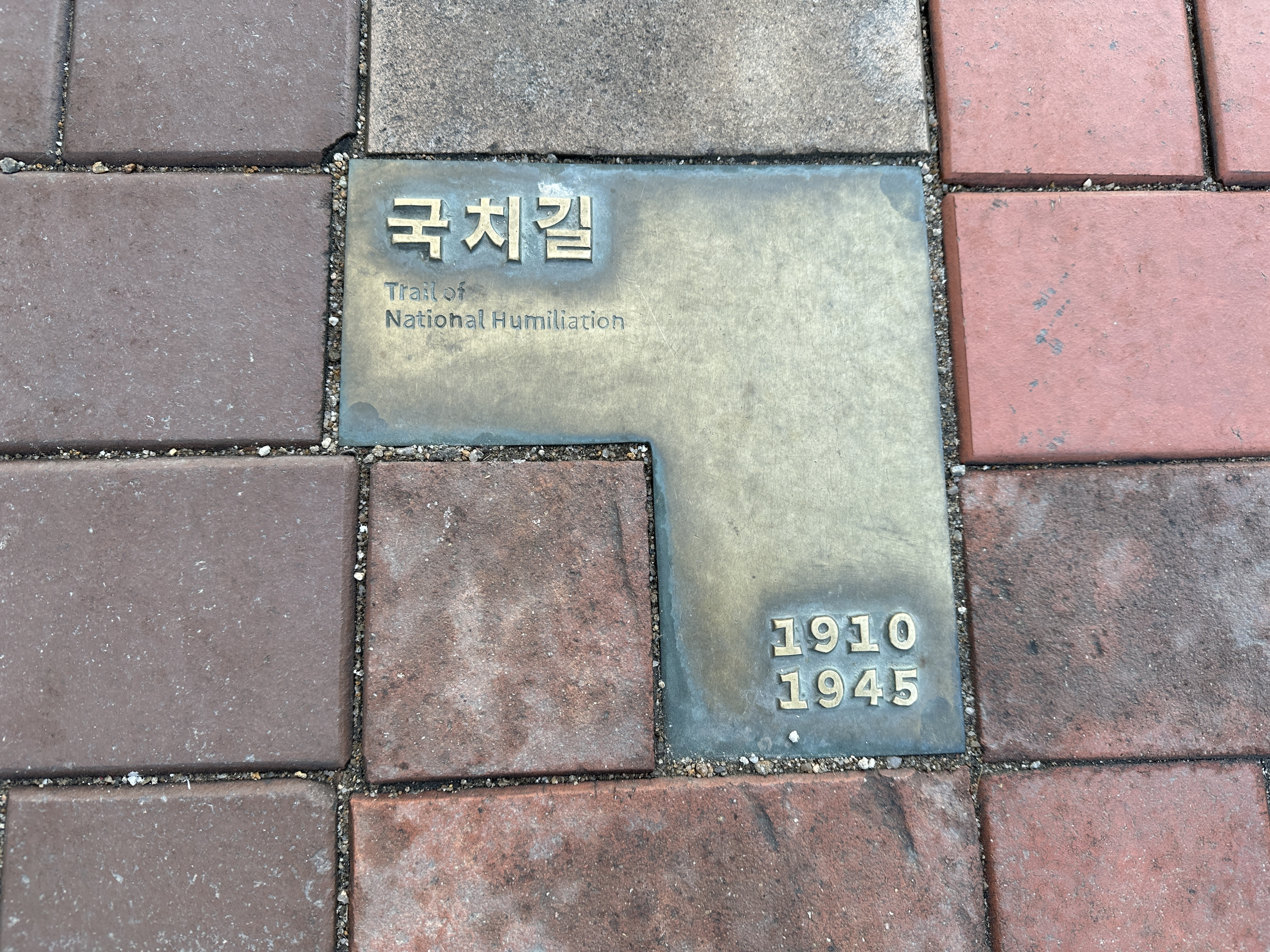
Plate marking the trail (2025)

The Trail of National Humiliation (Korean: 국치길) is a trail in Seoul, South Korea, that connects various sites related to the 1910–1945 Japanese colonial period in Korea. The trail began to be constructed in 2017 and was completed on August 28, 2019.

The trail is 1.7 km (1.1 mi) long, and is marked with ㄱ-shaped (short for 기억; lit. 'memory') plates on the ground indicating the direction of the trail. It also is decorated with yellow butterflies, symbolizing hope. It goes around the base of the mountain Namsan. It starts at Namsan Yejang Park (남산예장공원), near exit 1 of Myeong-dong station. The trail passes, in this order: a memorial to comfort women, the former site of the Japanese Residency-General of Korea Building (where the 1910 Japan-Korea Annexation Treaty was signed), the former site of a Government-General of Chōsen building, the former site of Nogi Shrine, the site of a former memorial to Japan's victory in the First Sino-Japanese War, the former site of Keijō Shrine, the entrance sign to the former Hanyang Park, and finally the former site of Chōsen Shrine.

The day after the trail opened was August 29: the anniversary of Korea's annexation. The Seoul Metropolitan Government held a group tour on that day, with descendents of Korean independence activists in attendance. A 2023 article claimed the path was relatively unpopular with locals; some of the sites are on private property of several schools and some of the signage was described as inadequate.
