= Yonggary (character) =

Korean kaiju

- First appearance: Yongary, Monster from the Deep (1967)
- Last appearance: Yonggary (1999)
- Created by: Shim Hyung-rae (1999 Yonggary)
- Portrayed by: Cho Kyoung-min (1967 Yonggary)
- Designed by: Masao Yagi (1967 Yonggary)

In-universe information
- Alias: Yonggari

Yonggary (Korean: 용가리; RR: Yonggari), also spelled Yongary, is a giant monster, or kaiju, that first appeared in the 1967 South Korean-Japanese co-produced film Yongary, Monster from the Deep. The film and its title character were produced to rival the success of Toho's Godzilla films during the mid-60s. The kaiju itself later appeared in the 1999 film Yonggary.

== Overview ==
=== Name and copyright ===
The name "Yonggary" is a combination of two Korean words: "Yong" (meaning dragon) and "gari" (derived from Pulgasari, a chimeral beast from Korean mythology). The rights to the character are currently owned by Younggu Art, founded by Korean filmmaker Shim Hyung-rae, director of Yonggary (1999). The original iteration spelled the name with a single "G", while the 1999/2001 version spelled it with two "G"'s.

=== Development ===
==== 1967 Yonggary ====
The 1967 Yonggary was originally conceived as a single-celled organism from space that mutated into a giant monster after exposure from radiation during a nuclear bomb test. The 1967 Yonggary was brought to life using a man in a rubber suit. Masao Yagi, who built the Gamera suit for Daiei, supervised the construction of the Yonggary suit. The character was designed in Korea, while the suit was built in Japan based on the Korean design. Director Kim Ki-duk found that the suit lacked terror and was disappointed with the final results but proceeded to film with the suit since there was no time or money to produce a new suit. The suit ended up costing ₩1.2 million ($5,000 in USD) to produce. Cho Kyoung-min portrayed Yonggary, who was paid ₩100,000 ($400 in USD). The film and its title character were produced to rival the success of Toho's Godzilla and the film was released in Germany as Godzilla's Todespranke (Godzilla's Hand of Death). The 1967 Yonggary has a bipedal reptilian design with a long horn on his snout, tusks at the side of his mouth, a single row of dorsal fins, and spikes on the side of his tail. The 1967 Yonggary is capable of breathing fire and his primary food source is oil and gasoline.

==== 1999 Yonggary ====
In the opening credits of the 2001 upgrade edition of Yonggary, Shim Hyung-rae (the film's director) is credited as the creator of the 1999 incarnation of Yonggary. Miniatures and suits for Yonggary and Cycor were produced, but the suits were later replaced with Computer-generated imagery during post-production, thus the 1999 Yonggary is made nearly entirely out of CGI effects. For the film's CGI effects, the animators used a technique called the "pipeline method", Park Chang-yong (Younggu Art's Chief of 3D Animation) described it as "a continuous process. It strives for large synergy effects by enhancing efficiency at all stages from 3D computer graphic modeling to rendering". The film ended up utilizing 45 minutes of computer graphics.

The 1999 Yonggary has a drastically different design from the original 1967 incarnation. The 1999 incarnation sports three horns on his head and the horn on his snout has been decreased to a smaller size. The 1999 Yonggary is capable of breathing fire (referred to as "fireballs" in the film) and has a diamond-shaped receptor on his forehead that allow the aliens to control him. Under the aliens' control, Yonggary is shown to be aggressive and violent, but when the military breaks the aliens' control over Yonggary, he is shown to be gentle, even protective. While the 1967 Yonggary died, the 1999 incarnation is shown to live and is transported by the military to a deserted island to live in peace.

== Merchandise ==
In 2008, graphic designer Hong Gi-hun (founder of South Korea's "Big Monster Club") created "semi-official" toys based on Korean monsters, such as the 1967 Yonggary, Pulgasari, and Wangmagwi. Though semi-official, Shim Hyung-rae still gave his blessing for the Yonggary toy and two sets of the toys were presented by film director Kim Ki-duk, director of the original Yongary, Monster from the Deep (1967).

== Appearances ==
=== Films ===
- Yongary, Monster from the Deep (1967)
- Yonggary (1999)

== See also ==
- Godzilla
- Gamera
- Rhedosaurus
