= Hanyang Park =

1910–1919 park in Keijō, Korea

Coordinates: 37°33′13″N 126°58′57″E

Hanyang Park (Korean: 한양공원; Hanja: 漢陽公園) was a public park in Seoul (Keijō), Korea that existed between 1910 and 1919 at the northwest side of the mountain Namsan.

== History ==
The park was created for the increasing number of Japanese settlers arriving in Korea. Korea had ended its period of isolation several decades before, after it was forcefully opened by Japan. The Korean government leased a significant portion of land north of Namsan, free of charge, to the Japanese residents for the construction of the park. Construction began on it in either 1908 or 1909, and the park officially opened on May 29, 1910. The former Korean monarch Gojong (who had been forced to abdicate in favor of his son) selected the name of the park. Its opening ceremony was attended by around 2,000 people. To commemorate the park's opening, he personally engraved the name of the park on a stone monument; this monument was erected at the entrance to the park in 1912. It is not known whether Gojong had performed this engraving by choice. Months after the opening of the park, Japan formally annexed Korea.

On July 18, 1919, it was decided that the park would be closed to make way for Chōsen Shrine, which was to be the main Shinto shrine in Korea. Its facilities were almost all destroyed during the construction process. The park was still attested to in a 1928 listing of parks in the city. However, it was not listed in a 1940 listing.

=== Stone monument ===
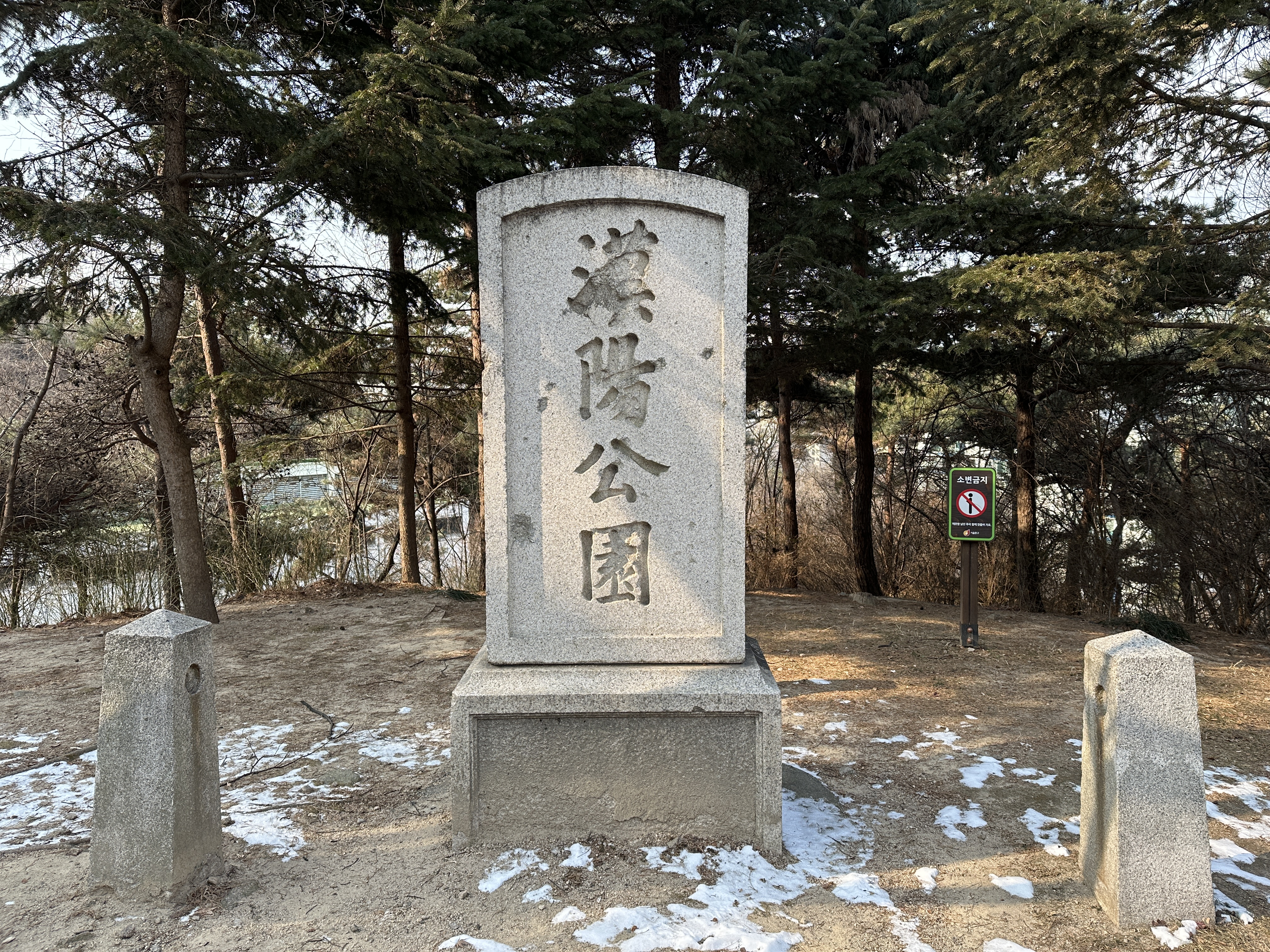
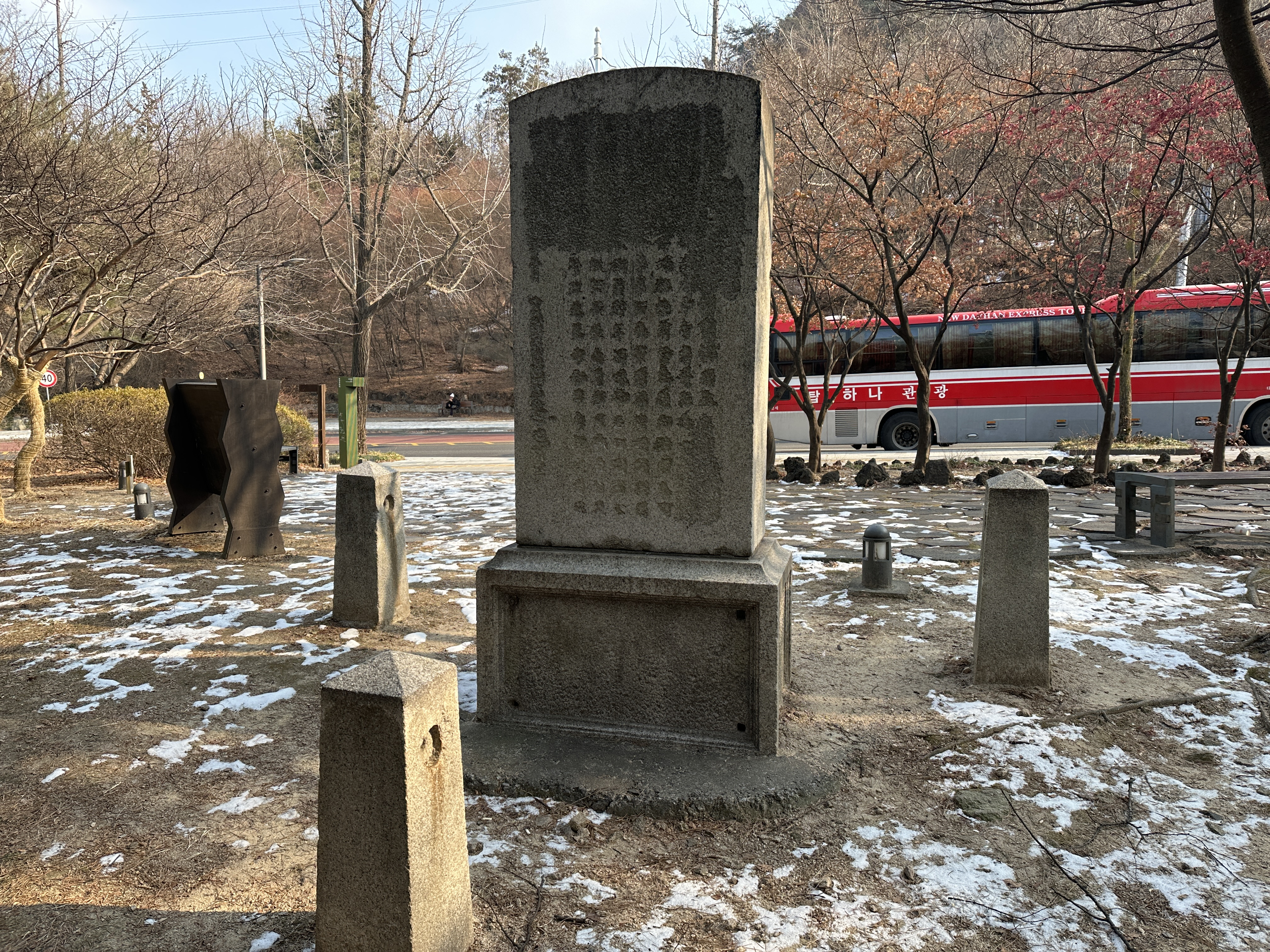
The restored monument, front and reverse (2025)

The stone monument was moved elsewhere during the demolition process. It eventually came to rest near the entrance of what would become Namsan Tunnel No. 3. During the tunnel’s construction, it was possibly moved again to another nearby location. In 2002, it was found lying in the grass behind a fence. In 2009, it was restored and made into a public exhibit.

The stone monument is of size 110 cm × 55.5 cm × 45 cm (43.3 in × 21.9 in × 17.7 in). It was placed on a granite pedestal, with the name of the park inscribed in Hanja on the front. An inscription on the back was nearly illegible by the time of its rediscovery, but its message is known from old photographs. The monument was surrounded by three square stone pillars. There are possibly bullet marks in the stone; these may be from the 1950–1953 Korean War.

The monument has been described as an unpleasant but important reminder of the colonial period. It is not classified in South Korea's national heritage system; instead it was given the Seoul Future Heritage designation, which is administered by the Seoul Metropolitan Government. This is reflective of the monument's association with a Japanese institution in the country. In 2017, the monument became one stop along the Trail of National Humiliation, which walks between various former sites of Japanese institutions near Namsan.
