= Space Monster Wangmagwi =

- 1967 Newspaper ad
- Directed by: Kwon Hyeok-jin
- Written by: Byeon Ha-yeong
- Starring: Han Eun-jin; Kim Hie-gab; Won Namkung; Kim Seon-kyeong
- Cinematography: Chang Gi Ham
- Edited by: Dong-Chun Hyeon
- Music by: Jong-kun Jeon
- Production company: Century Company
- Release date: June 27, 1967
- Running time: 83 minutes
- Country: South Korea
- Language: Korean

Space Monster Wangmagwi (Korean: 우주괴인 왕마귀; RR: Ujugoein wangmagwi; lit. Devil King, the Space Monster) is a 1967 South Korean kaiju film. It is the oldest surviving kaiju film to be made in South Korea, and the first all-Korean science fiction film. It was inspired by monster movies from Japan and America, such as Godzilla and King Kong. Particularly, the monster kidnaps a woman in a manner which is reminiscent of King Kong. The film is about an alien monster attacking South Korea, and features several comedic vignettes, all of which take place during the monster's rampage.

== Plot ==
South Korean air force pilot Oh Jeong-hwan and his betrothed, Ahn-hee, are excited for their wedding, which is to occur the next day. Oh Jeong-hwan is called to the air force base because of an unspecified emergency, which they presume to be related to the incoming typhoon.

Meanwhile, a glowing spaceship approaches the earth. On-board, aliens from the Gamma star discuss their imminent invasion of Earth. They plan to destroy humanity with a monster, which they send to attack South Korea first. Although the monster is initially human-sized, it grows enormous because Earth's gravity is much lower than that of the Gamma star.

The next day, Seoul is being evacuated because of the monster's approach, but Ahn-hee and her mother linger, determined to follow through with the planned wedding. They evacuate too late, and the monster kidnaps Ahn-hee. The air force tries to fight the monster in the city, (Note: Per Jeong & Goodrich 2022, this is what happens in the original Korean version. The English-language localization mistranslates some of the dialogue so that the air force doesn't fight the monster in Seoul initially, but then later changes their minds and engages - the inverse of what occurs in the original.) but the monster is unperturbed and destroys much of Seoul.

During the rampage, the monster attempts to crush a homeless boy named Squirrel, who was earlier looting Ahn-Hee's home. Squirrel climbs the monster, repeatedly stabs the monster's inner-ear, and urinates in the monster's head. Eventually, the boy falls, and the monster seizes him.

The air force decides to stop fighting the monster in Seoul, and instead try to lead it away. They chase it out of the city. The monster destroys Oh's jet fighter, and he ejects. He rescues Ahn-hee and Squirrel as he parachutes to the ground. One of the jet fighters crashes into the monster. The aliens decide that the humans are too dangerous to conquer, and stop attacking. They kill the monster by detonating an explosive they had affixed to it.

=== Sketches ===
Although Space Monster Wangmagwi has an overarching plot, much of the film is instead composed of comedy sketches that have little-to-no impact on the story. They are described here.

- Two men make a bet about who is the braver man. One man bets his house and his wife, the other bets his life savings. The latter man claims to have won, and tries to take the former man's wife as his own. When the monster frightens them, all three embrace each other and declare that they are one family.
- A man in a crowded building needs to defecate. He finds a newspaper and starts defecating on it. At the same time, a woman begins giving birth. When the monster swats at the building, the man falls into his feces.
- The gamblers from the first sketch make a bet about where the monster will throw a large rock, this time only betting cash. The same man wins this bet as well.

== Cast ==
- Namkoong Won as Jeong-wan Oh
- Seon-kyeong Kim as Ahn-hee
- Sang-cheol Jeon as Squirrel / Spider
- Eun-jin Han as Han Nae-sook
- Hie-gab Kim as Gambling Men
- Song Hae as Gambling Men
- Park Am as Gyu Sam
- Park Si-myung as Wangmagwi
- Park Ok-cho as Gamma Commander

== Themes ==
=== Korean War ===
Although Space Monster Wangmagwi concerns an attack by alien lifeforms instead of any real-world aggressor, Sueng-hoon Jeong and John Goodrich point out that the film contains many allusions to the Korean War. Notably, the monster appears to arrive in Korea near the Joint Security Area, and proceed south, as if attacking from North Korea. In addition, the separation of Ahn-hee from her family may be symbolic of the separation of North and South Korea, American involvement on the side of South Korea is implied, and the monster sprays a liquid from its head which has an effect resembling that of napalm, which was dropped on North Korea during the Korean War.

=== Family values ===
Sueng-hoon Jeong points out that Ahn-hee, with her western-style clothing and modern attitude, is "a symbol of a new, emergent nuclear family." This modern perspective on family values is especially apparent in Ahn-hee and Oh Jeong-hwan's decision to adopt Squirrel, when blood-relation was traditionally very important in Korean culture.

=== Patriarchy ===
Space Monster Wangmagwi presents a patriarchal view of marriage and social-structures. This is shown when the gamblers stake one of their wives on their bravery. At the same time, Oh Jeong-hwan is presented as a masculine role-model because of his ability to rescue and protect his bride-to-be.

== Release ==
=== Theatrical ===
Space Monster Wangmagwi opened on June 27, 1967 in the Daehan and Segi theaters. It competed with Yongary, Monster from the Deep, which was released less than 2 months later the same year.

Until 2022, the Korean Film Archive had the only remaining copies of the film, and held occasional screenings. They also made it available for digital viewing on demand in their library.

It screened for the first time in North America on July 23, 2022, in Concordia University's J.A. DeSève Cinema as a part of the 26th Fantasia International Film Festival, having been provided by SRS Cinema.

=== Critical response ===
After watching the film at the Fantasia International Film Festival, Christopher Stewardson of Our Culture Mag gave it one and a half stars out of five, writing: "While not a good film, Space Monster Wangmagwi has its moments of weird delight. Its appeal may be elusive for most, but I'm glad it's getting its moment in the sun."

=== Home media ===
The film received no home media release in any country until 2022, when SRS Cinema acquired the license to distribute it in the United States, and released it on Blu-ray, VHS, and DVD. The Blu-ray and VHS releases were limited editions, but the DVD was not.

== See also ==
- List of South Korean films of 1967
- Yongary, Monster from the Deep
