= Yongary, Monster from the Deep =

1967 kaiju film

- Theatrical release poster
- Hangul: 대괴수 용가리
- Hanja: 大怪獸 용가리
- RR: Daegoesu Yonggari
- MR: Taegoesu Yonggari
- Directed by: Kim Ki-duk
- Written by: Kim Ki-duk; Seo Yun-sung
- Produced by: Cha Tae-jin
- Starring: Oh Yeong-il; Nam Jeong-im
- Cinematography: Byeon In-jib
- Music by: Jeon Jeong-Keun
- Production companies: Keukdong Entertainment Company; Toei Company
- Distributed by: Toei (South Korea/Japan); American International Television (United States)
- Release date: August 13, 1967 (Seoul)
- Running time: 80 minutes (Note: Applies to the English edit for American International Television. With no surviving copy of the original Korean print, its runtime is unknown. Elements of the original Korean version exist in a damaged 48-minute print acquired by the Korean Film Archive.)
- Countries: South Korea; Japan
- Languages: Korean; English
- Budget: ₩13–30 million

Yongary, Monster from the Deep (Korean: 대괴수 용가리; RR: Daegoesu yonggari; lit. 'The Great Monster Yonggary') is a 1967 kaiju film directed by Kim Ki-duk, with special effects by Kenichi Nakagawa. The film was a joint production between South Korean studio Keukdong (Far East) Entertainment Company and Japanese studio Toei Company. The film stars Oh Yeong-il, Kwang Ho Lee, Nam Jeong-im, with Cho Kyoung-min as Yongary. In the film, a giant reptilian monster lays waste to Seoul after being awakened by an earthquake triggered by a nuclear bomb test.

The film was produced to rival the success of Toho's Godzilla series and features the same techniques of practical special effects filmmaking used in the Godzilla films and other kaiju films utilizing suitmation, pyrotechnics, and miniature sets. The film opened in Seoul, South Korea on August 13, 1967 and was released in the United States directly to television by American International Television in 1969 as Yongary, Monster from the Deep. In 1999, filmmaker Shim Hyung-rae released a reimagining of his own titled Yonggary.

== Plot ==
Based on the English version. The original Korean version is considered partly lost.

In South Korea, a family gathers for the wedding of an astronaut, but the astronaut is called back to duty to monitor a nuclear test in the Middle East. The test triggers an earthquake that shifts the epicenter to the heart of Korea. The authorities initially withhold this information from the public until they are sure the earthquake will strike, but once it reaches the Hwanghae province, the authorities impose martial law in the area. The quake strikes Panmunjom, where a photographer takes pictures of the ground splitting, which reveals a giant creature moving inside. The photographer manages to get away, but crashes his car due to the quake. The photographer manages to reach the authorities and deliver the photographs of the creature before succumbing to his injuries. The authorities name the creature "Yongary", based on an old Korean fable about a monster connected to earthquakes.

While South Korea is being evacuated, the South Korean army is dispatched to the Inwang area to attack Yongary, but with no success. Il-Woo, a young scientist, decides to go to Seoul to find a weakness in Yongary. His girlfriend, Soona, opposes this, but he goes anyway. Soona and her younger brother, Icho, pursue Il-Woo to try to stop him. Yongary eventually reaches Seoul and causes complete destruction. During the rampage, Il-Woo and Soona lose Icho and walk around trying to find him. The military suggests using guided missiles against Yongary, but the authorities fear the missiles might do more damage than the monster and may destroy the landmarks of old Korea. However, the authorities decide that Korea's future is more important and agree to use the guided missiles. Icho manages to escape through the city's sewers and reaches an oil refinery, where he finds Yongary drinking oil and gasoline. Icho turns off the main valve, which causes Yongary to go berserk and destroy a tank that triggers a chemical reaction that makes Yongary itch and scratch.

Icho then returns to Il-Woo's house to tell him what happened at the refinery. Il-Woo then reveals this discovery to the authorities and urges them to not use the guided missiles because they will give him more energy, but his claims are brushed off and they proceed with the missile plan regardless. Il-Woo then goes to work on a chemical to defeat Yongary using a precipitate of ammonia. Yongary is then struck with Il-Woo's ammonia and missiles, which is enough to put him temporarily to sleep; however, Il-Woo believes the precipitate needs work to make it more effective. Icho takes a light device from Il-Woo's lab and shines it on an immobile Yongary, which triggers him to wake up. To Icho's amusement, Yongary then begins dancing, but then returns to his rampage. Il-Woo loads the finalized ammonia precipitate onto a helicopter and dumps it on Yongary in the Han River, where Yongary collapses and dies from blood loss after violently bleeding from his body. The following morning, Il-Woo is commended for his role in defeating Yongary; however, he cites Icho as the real hero for providing him with the information of Yongary's eating habits. In the end, Icho opines that Yongary was not evil by nature, but rather simply looking for food.

== Cast ==
- Oh Yeong-il as Il-Woo (Note: Called "Illo" in the English dub.)
- Kwang Ho Lee as Yoo Young (Note: Called "Icho" in the English dub.)
- Nam Jeong-im as Yoo Soon-a
- Lee Sun-jae as Yoo Kwang-nam
- Moon Kang as Kim Yu-ri
- Cho Kyoung-min as Yongary

== Production ==
The screenwriter originally intended for Yongary to be a single-celled organism from space that mutated into a giant monster after exposure from radiation. Film critic and scholar Kim Song-ho revealed that in the original Korean script the name of the country conducting nuclear tests (the Middle East in the English version) was originally called "Orebia", with the location of the test being the "Goma Desert". In another part of the script, the "Goma Desert" was spelled as "Gobi Desert". Song-ho stated this was likely a typo and that the writer intended to have Yongary originate from the Middle East.

Principal photography began on April 3, 1967, while the special effects photography commenced on April 6 with Cho Kyoung-min performing in the Yongary suit, who was paid ₩100,000 ($400 in USD). The special effects took three months to shoot and were filmed in two studios in Seoul. The miniatures and models cost ₩5 million ($20,000 in USD), the 12 constructed sets cost ₩7 million ($27,000 in USD), the Yongary suit cost ₩1.2 million ($5,000 in USD), and ₩500,000 ($2,000 in USD) was spent on gunpowder for pyrotechnics.

=== Special effects ===
Keukdong (Far East) Entertainment Company employed staff from Equis Productions and Toei's special effects staff to helm the film's effects. Masao Yagi, who built the Gamera suit for Daiei, supervised the construction of the Yongary suit. The character was designed in Korea, while the suit was built in Japan based on the Korean team's design. Director Kim Ki-duk found that the suit lacked terror and was disappointed with the final results, but proceeded to film with the suit since there was no time or money to produce a new suit. An optical printer was used for a few composite shots. Akira Suzuki designed the mechanical miniature props.

Lee Byoung-woo, the film's associate producer, acted as an intermediate between the South Korean filmmakers and the Japanese staff and helped train the South Korean staff in the special effects techniques used by the Japanese crew. Byoung-woo arranged for the Japanese crew to come work on the effects and is credited as the film's special effects cinematographer in the film's original Korean credits. The final film had 280 special effects cuts, with the crew filming three to five cuts per day. 15,000 lightbulbs were used for the miniature sets, with two-thirds of the available lighting equipment from studios in the country assembled for the film.

== English version ==
For its release in North America, Keukdong Entertainment Company sold the film to American International Pictures and released it under the new title Yongary, Monster from the Deep through their television division in 1969. AIP attached Salvatore Billitteri to supervise the English version's post-production and had the film dubbed by Titra Studios. Infamously, when the film was being sold overseas, the Korean producers (due to a lack of experience) shipped all of the original negatives and sound elements to Toei, who acted as the film's international sales agent. As a result, the original South Korean version of the film has been deemed lost and the AIP English dubbed version is the only version of the film that survives. The film was shown regularly during the '70s on syndicated television. U.S. ownership of the film kept changing: AIP was picked up by Filmways, Inc. in 1979, which merged with Orion Pictures, which was later acquired by Metro-Goldwyn-Mayer in 1997.

== Release ==
=== Theatrical ===
The film opened at the Kukje Cinema in Seoul on August 13, 1967, and sold 110,000 to 150,000 tickets during its theatrical run, which was a success for the film at the time due to a low number of cinemas in the country (570 screens total) and the population at the time being 25 million. Keukdong Entertainment partnered with Toei for the film's international release, with Toei acting as the film's international sales agent. Toei's name was featured in posters in various territories, leading to confusion that the film was a complete Japanese production. For its German release, the film was re-titled as Godzilla's Todespranke (Godzilla's Hand of Death), despite not being related to Godzilla. The film disappeared from South Korea after its original release and for a time, was considered a lost film amongst Korean film buffs. In the 2000s, the Korean Film Archive acquired a 48-minute 35mm print of the Korean version of the film. The print was converted to DigiBeta as it was unable to be projected due to heavy damage. The 48-minute version premiered at the first Chungmuro International Film Festival in 2008.

=== Critical response ===
Historian Steve Ryfle noted that reviews at the time were "quite good". A reviewer for the Kyunghyang Shinmun praised the film's production values and perceived it as a savior of the Korean film industry, stating, "The miniature sets of the city of Seoul, or tanks, or fighter planes were delicate and real." The writer also felt that the film would "breathe fresh air into Korean cinema". StompTokyo.com felt the film was too similar to Gamera, the Giant Monster but stated that "Yongary is one of the better Godzilla-inspired rip-offs. The suit has some impressive detailing, like the four tail spikes, and the suit looks more impressive than those that would show up in the majority of the Gamera films. While the effects are rarely very realistic, there are a lot of them, with probably more city destruction than would show up in any of the original Godzilla movies made after this point."

=== Home media ===
Orion Pictures released the film on VHS and LaserDisc in 1989. Alpha Video released a cropped, fullscreen version of the film on DVD in 2004. MGM released a widescreen remastered version of the film on DVD as part of their Midnite Movies line in September 2007, paired on a double-sided disc as a double feature with Konga. This was the first time the film was released in a widescreen scope. Previous releases were sourced from pan and scan edits of the TV version. The MGM DVD release was sourced from a textless interpositive of the complete film. Kino Lorber Studio Classics released the film on Blu-ray and DVD in January 2016, which featured an audio commentary by Steve Ryfle (author of Japan's Favorite Mon-Star: The Unofficial Biography of Godzilla) and Korean critic/scholar Kim Song-ho.

Due to the original prints having been lost, the film became unavailable on television and home media in its native country for 44 years until it was broadcast on television in South Korea for the first time on June 19, 2011; however, it was the English version that aired with Korean subtitles taken from the film's original Korean script.

The film was riffed on season 11 of Mystery Science Theater 3000 on Netflix.

== Commentary ==
Film historian Steve Ryfle noted that Yongary first appears in Panmunjom, the same location where the Korean Armistice Agreement that ended the Korean War in 1953 was signed, stating, "Symbolically, you could say, that the monster represents the South's fears in those days. It rises up from the ground in the place where the war stopped and resumes fighting and it swoops down from the North to destroy the city of Seoul all over again." Korean critic and scholar Kim Song-ho noted that Yongary's attack on the Government-General Building was a symbolic gesture from the Korean production team, stating, "In the point of view of the Korean crew, that might have kind of a double meaning. To crush the symbol of Japanese colonization by a Korean monster."

Film scholar and critic Kim So-Young published an essay in 2000 where he noted how the evacuation and destruction scenes in the original Godzilla film reminded Japanese audiences of the atomic bombings of Hiroshima and Nagasaki, the evacuation and destruction scenes in Yongary similarly reminded Korean audiences of the Korean War. Kim also addressed the film's theme of masculinity, stating that the astronaut and the young scientist are "tested to prove their masculinity throughout the story" and alludes to the country's crisis of masculinity at that time. He opined that Icho is the real hero of the film, believing Icho to be a mirror image of Yongary and a symbol of Korea's future.
