= Space Gundam V =

1983 South Korean animated film

- 스페이스 간담브이
- Directed by: Kim Cheong-gi
- Country of origin: South Korea
- Original language: Korean

Production
- Running time: 82 minutes

Original release
- Release: July 21, 1983

Space Gundam V (Korean: 스페이스 간담브이; sometimes spelled Space Gandam V) is a South Korean animated film directed by Kim Cheong-gi, released on July 21, 1983. Despite its title, the series is not related to Mobile Suit Gundam. It is known for incorporating an unlicensed version of the VF-1J Valkyrie of Macross fame and the heroic elements of Brave Raideen.

The series is currently available on DVD in South Korea.

== Background ==
During the 1970s and 1980s, the South Korean government implemented a ban on Japanese media, including newspapers, magazines, movies, television programs and manga. It was within this period that Korean animation was in its infancy. Many examples of early Korean animation incorporated unauthorized uses of Japanese anime characters and likenesses. For example, Space Black Knight featured characters that looked exactly like Amuro Ray, Char Aznable, Sayla Mass and Dozle Zabi of Mobile Suit Gundam. In Space Gundam V, the protagonist mecha was an unlicensed version of the VF-1J Valkyrie from The Super Dimension Fortress Macross.

Unlike the original Macross version - which portrayed the Valkyrie as a realistic combat mecha, Space Gundam V was presented as a Super Robot with quasi-mystical powers that battled a villainous entity on every episode. Much like the Super Robot shows Invincible Super Man Zambot 3 and Trider G7, the robot was piloted by a pre-teen boy. Notable villains included a giant rat and a winged devil.

Space Gundam V received international notoriety when clips of the series surfaced on YouTube. The series has been commonly panned by anime fans as being a ripoff of Macross, as well as Gundam due to its name. The show's crude animation has also been the subject of ridicule among viewers.

== Toys ==
The Space Gundam V toy was a Korean copy of the Takatoku Toys 1/55 VF-1J Valkyrie, right down to the original's box artwork.

== See also ==
- Korean animation
- The Super Dimension Fortress Macross
- Astro Plan - A 2010 Chinese animated TV series that also uses Macross-derived designs.
