= Japanese Residency-General of Korea Building =

1907–1962 building in Keijō, Korea

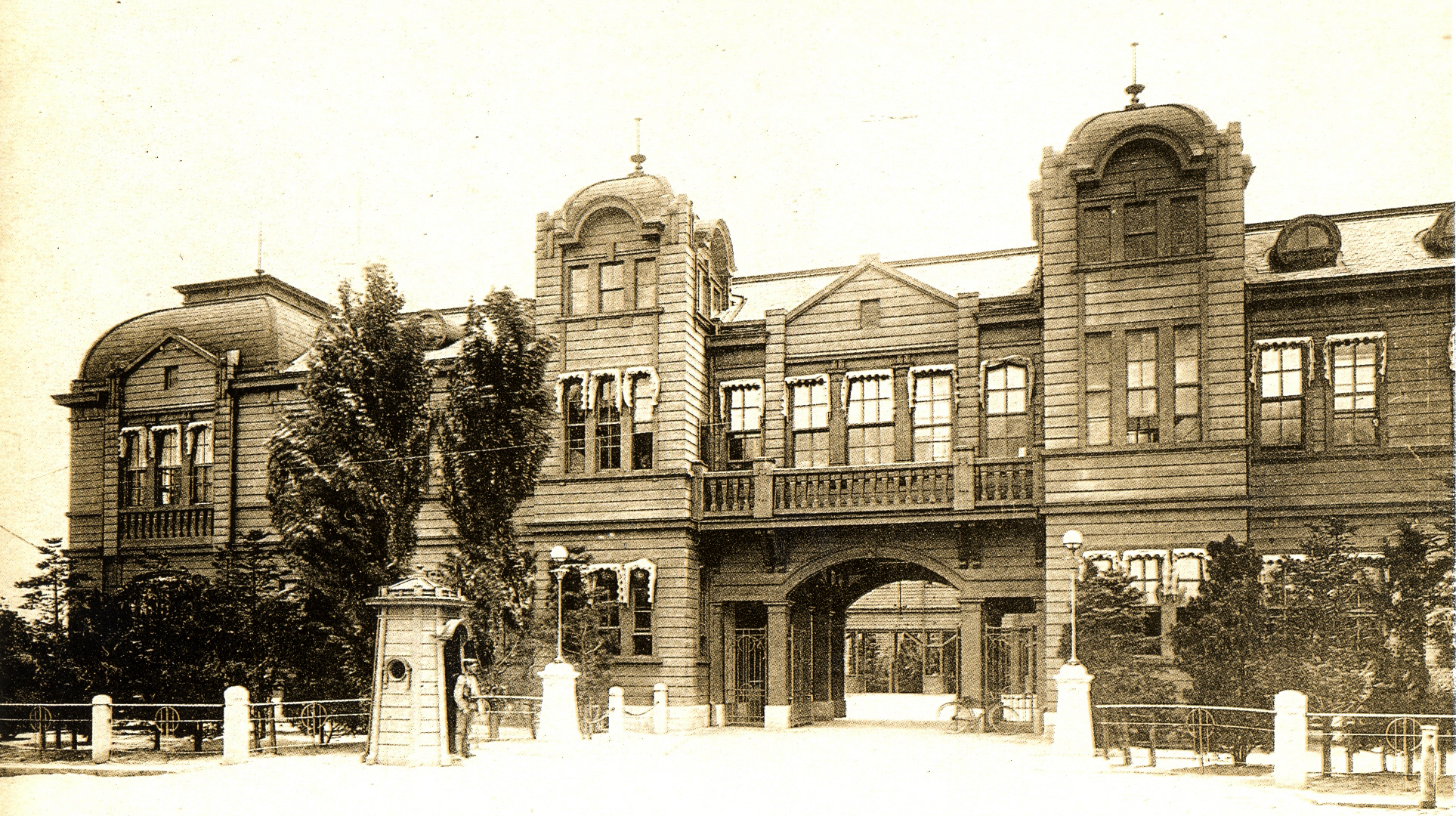
- The building
- Interactive map of the Japanese Residency-General of Korea Building area

General information
- Location: Waesŏngdae, Keijō, Korea, Empire of Japan
- Coordinates: 37.5589°N 126.9902°E
- Construction started: February 1906
- Completed: February 28, 1907
- Demolished: 1962

The Japanese Residency-General of Korea Building (Note: 統監府庁舎; Korean: 통감부 청사; Hanja: 統監府廳舍) was the headquarter building of the Japanese Residency-General of Korea and its successor the Government-General of Chōsen from 1907 to 1926. The building was used as the residence of the Japanese Resident-General of Korea and later Governor-General of Chōsen until 1939. After the 1945 liberation of Korea, it was used as a museum. It was demolished around 1962.

Its former site is now a memorial called The Site of Memory (기억의 터). That memorial, in part, commemorates comfort women who were forced into functional sexual slavery for Japan. The ruins of the building and a statue of Hayashi Gonsuke, a major figure in organizing Korea's subordination to Japan in 1905, are symbolically inverted into the ground. During the Russo-Japanese War, Hayashi served as Deputy Ambassador to the Kingdom of Korea, and in that capacity signed the Japan–Korea Treaty of February 1904 of February 23, 1904, which gave the Imperial Japanese Army freedom of action on the Korean Peninsula. This was followed by the Japan–Korea Agreement of August 1904 and the Japan–Korea Treaty of 1905 which resulted in Korea becoming a protectorate of the Empire of Japan.

== History ==
After the Japan–Korea Treaty of 1905, Korea was made a protectorate of Japan and placed under the Japanese Residency-General of Korea and the Japanese Resident-General of Korea. At first, that body was headquartered on a building in Yukjo Street in Downtown Seoul. Meanwhile, they began construction on a new headquarters.

Construction on the Japanese Residency-General of Korea Building was held from February 1906 to February 28, 1907. The building was located on the hill Waesŏngdae at the foot of the mountain Namsan. It was a three-story wooden building. The Resident-General resided in the building. After Korea was annexed by Japan in 1910, the building became the headquarters of the Government-General of Chōsen and residence of the Governor-General of Chōsen.

The building was considered too small for the expanded duties of the Government-General. Work began in the mid-1910s to construct the Government-General of Chōsen Building in the former royal palace Gyeongbokgung. That building was completed in 1926 and became the headquarters of the government-general, although the governor-general continued to reside in the previous headquarters until 1939.

The Japan–Korea Treaty of 1910 was signed on the second floor of the building. A statue of Hayashi Gonsuke, a major figure in the signing of the Japan–Korea Treaty of 1905, was installed in front of the building in 1936.

After the 1945 liberation of Korea, the building became used as a museum (민족박물관). The building was demolished some time around 1962. It was replaced with the headquarters of the Agency for National Security Planning. Its location was then mostly forgotten in the public consciousness. In July 2005, researcher Lee Sun-u (이순우) rediscovered its location. The statue of Hayashi had been partially buried near the building. In 2015, a project to convert the site into a memorial was completed. Some ruins of the building are at the site. These ruins and the statue were symbolically inverted and placed into the ground. It is a stop on the Trail of National Humiliation, a trail that passes by various sites of the colonial period.

== Gallery ==
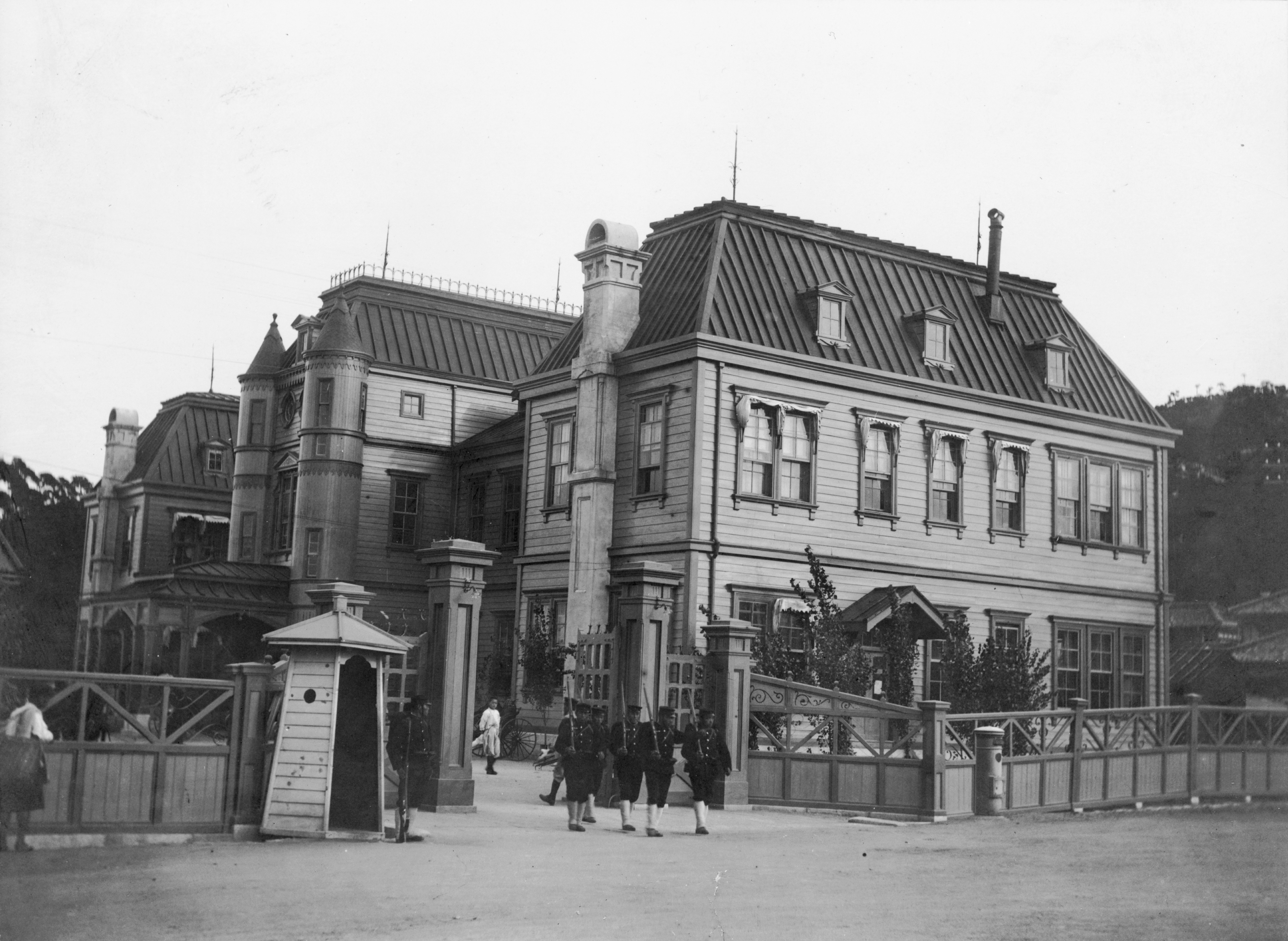
Another angle of the building
