= Governor-General of Chōsen =

Head of Korea under Japanese rule

- 朝鮮総督
- 5–7 paulownia Stamp Seal

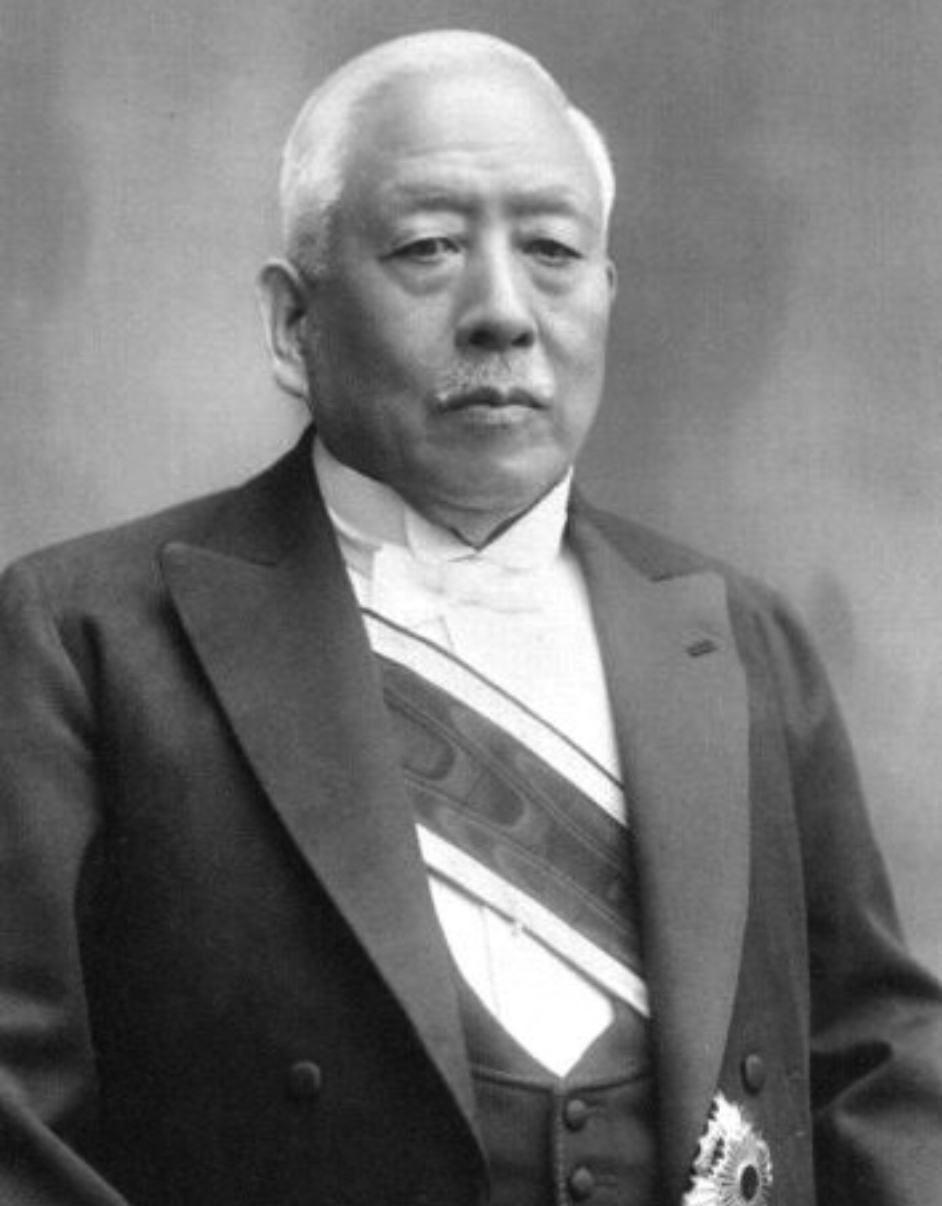
- Longest serving Viscount Saitō Makoto; 12 August 1919 – 14 April 1927; 17 August 1929 – 17 June 1931
- Status: Abolished
- Residence: Official residence of the Governor-General of Chōsen
- Seat: Government-General Building, Keijō
- Appointer: Emperor of Japan
- Precursor: Resident-General of Korea
- Formation: 1 October 1910
- First holder: Terauchi Masatake
- Final holder: Nobuyuki Abe
- Abolished: 12 September 1945
- Superseded by: Soviet Civil Administration; United States Army Military Government in Korea

The Governor-General of Chōsen (Japanese: 朝鮮総督, romanized: Chōsen Sōtoku; Korean: 조선총독, romanized: Joseon Chongdok) was the chief administrator of the Government-General of Chōsen, a part of an administrative organ established by the Imperial government of Japan. The position existed from 1910 to 1945.

The governor-general of Chōsen was established shortly after the Korean Empire was formally annexed by the Empire of Japan in the Japan–Korea Treaty of 1910 to replace the title of Resident-General. The governor-general of Chōsen was appointed from Tokyo and accountable to the emperor of Japan. The governor-general of Chōsen was responsible for the administrate ministry of the Chōsen regionin, including infrastructure, culture, justice, censorship, and the suppression of the Korean independence movement.

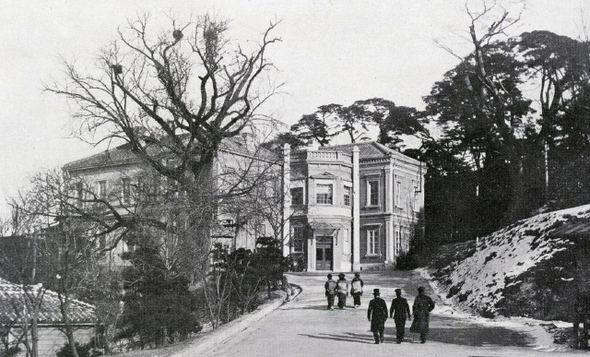
European-style official residence of Governor General of Korea, at Namsan in 1911.

The governor-general of Chōsen was seated in the General Government Building in Keijō after its completion in 1926. Pending its completion, the governor-general resided at Namsan.

== History ==
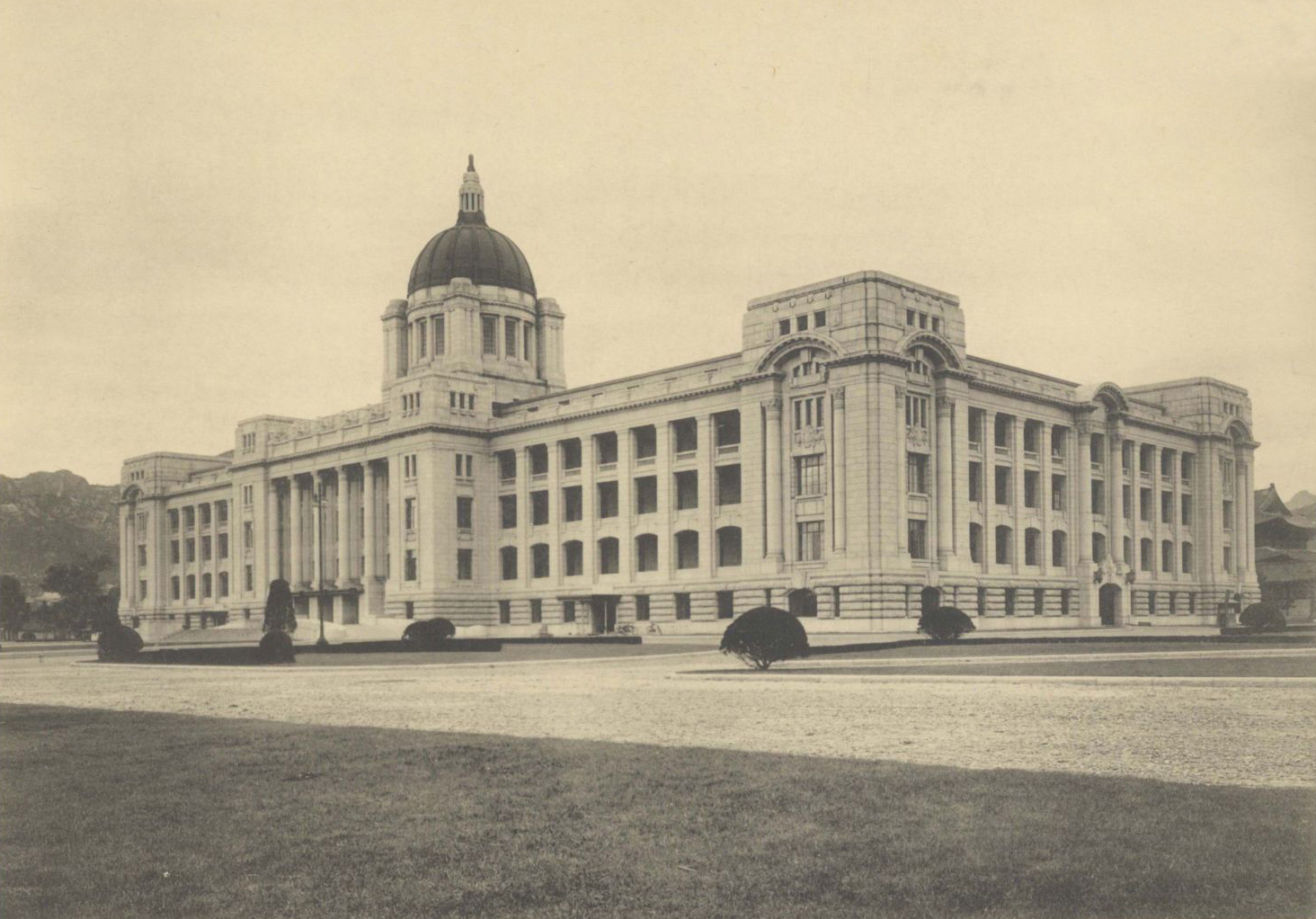
Japanese General Government Building, Seoul

Seal of the Government-General of Korea.svg

After the annexation of Korea to Japan in 1910, the office of resident-general was replaced by that of governor-general. However, the position was unique in among Japan's external possessions, as the governor-general had sweeping plenipotentiary powers, and the position also entailed judicial oversight and some legislative powers. As of 1944, the governor-general did not command the Imperial Japanese Army or Imperial Japanese Navy units stationed in Chōsen. Given the powers and levels of responsibility, only ranking full generals in the Imperial Japanese Army were selected for the post, with the sole exception of Viscount Saitō, a retired admiral.

The governor-general of Chōsen had a police organisation, which may have been partly involved in having Korean women working as comfort women.

After the Japanese defeat in World War II, the Korean Peninsula was administered by the Democratic People's Republic of Korea and the Republic of Korea. The governor-general building was demolished during administration of South Korean president Kim Young-sam on August 15, 1995.

=== Prime Ministers of Japan ===
Four individuals who held the position of the governor-general of Chōsen also held the office of the prime minister of Japan. Three, Terauchi Masatake, Saitō Makoto, and Koiso Kuniaki, were governors-general before becoming prime ministers. One, Abe Nobuyuki, was prime minister before his appointment as governor-general. Ugaki Kazushige was named prime minister-designate, but he could not take office because he was unable to form a cabinet.

In addition, Resident-General Itō Hirobumi served four terms as prime minister prior to his appointment to Korea.

== Governors-general ==
After the annexation of Korea to Japan in 1910, the office of resident general was replaced by that of governor-general.

1. General Count Terauchi Masatake 寺内 正毅 (1910–1916)
2. Gensui Count Hasegawa Yoshimichi 長谷川好道 (1916–1919)
3. Admiral Viscount Saitō Makoto 斎藤 実 (1919–1927)
4. General Kazushige Ugaki 宇垣 一成 (1927)
5. General Yamanashi Hanzō 山梨半造 (1927–1929)
6. Viscount Saitō Makoto 斎藤 実 (second time 1929–1931)
7. General Kazushige Ugaki 宇垣 一成 (second time 1931–1936)
8. General Minami Jirō 南次郎 (1936–1942)
9. General (ret'd) Koiso Kuniaki 小磯 國昭 (1942–1944)
10. General (ret'd) Abe Nobuyuki 阿部信行 (1944–1945)

== See also ==
- Governor-General of Taiwan
- Rulers of Korea
- Anti-Japanese sentiment in Korea
- Japanese militarism
- Japanese nationalism
