= Government-General of Chōsen Building =

1926–1996 colonial building in Korea

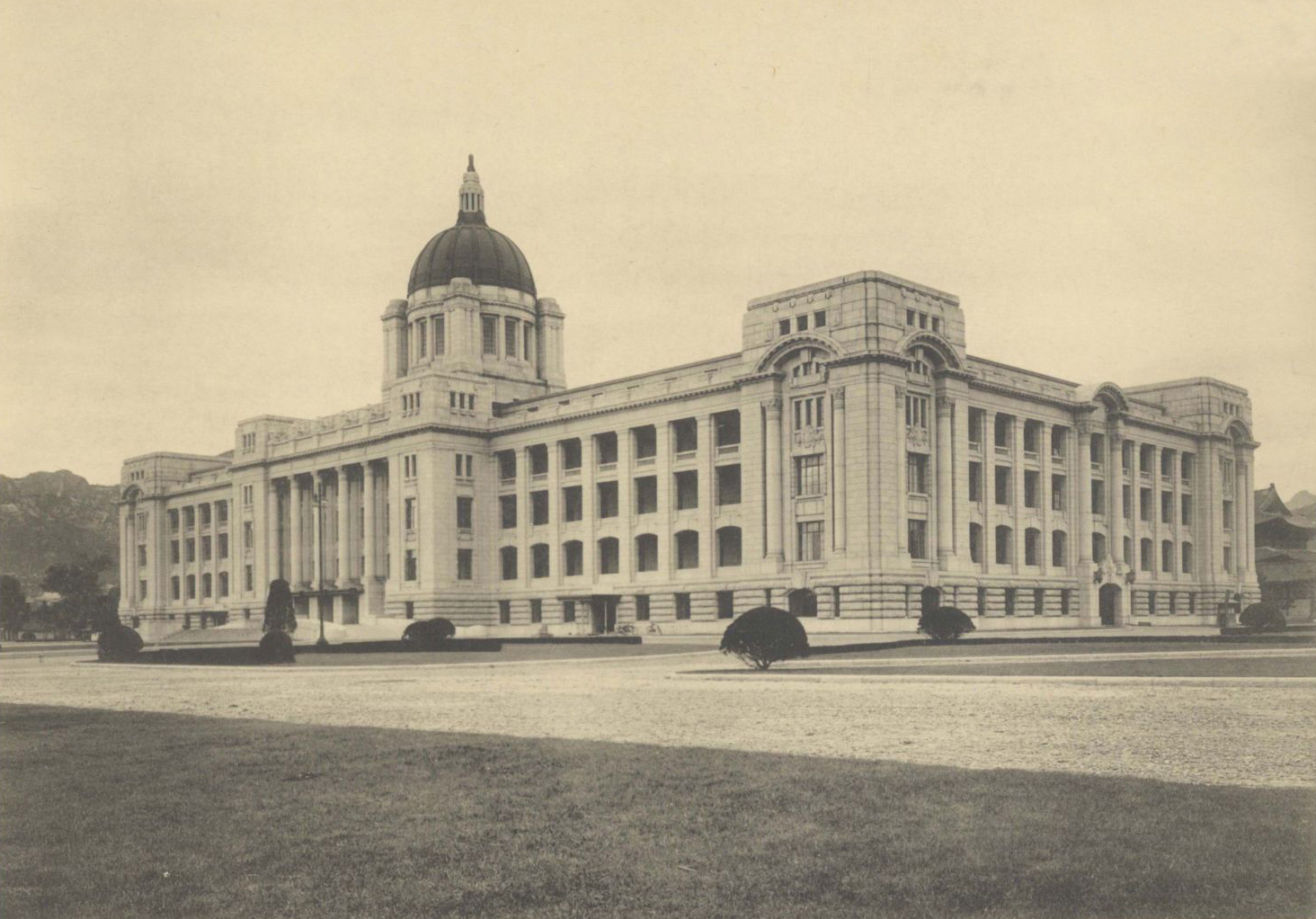
- The building in 1929
- Alternative names: Government-General Building, Seoul Capitol, Capitol Hall

General information
- Status: Demolished
- Architectural style: Neoclassical
- Location: Jongno District, Seoul, South Korea
- Coordinates: 37.577393°N 126.97725°E
- Construction started: 25 June 1916
- Completed: 1 October 1926
- Demolished: 15 August 1995 – 13 November 1996

Design and construction
- Architects: Georg de Lalande; Ichiro Nomura; Hirushi Kunieda

Korean name
- Hangul: 조선총독부 청사
- Hanja: 朝鮮總督府廳舍
Transcriptions
- Revised Romanization: Joseonchongdokbu cheongsa
- McCune–Reischauer: Chosŏnch'ongdokpu ch'ŏngsa

Japanese name
- Kanji: 朝鮮総督府庁舎
Transcriptions
- Revised Hepburn: Chōsensōtokufu chōsha

The Government-General of Chōsen Building, (Note: 朝鮮総督府庁舎; Korean: 조선총독부 청사; Hanja: 朝鮮總督府廳舍) also known as the Japanese General Government Building and the Seoul Capitol, was a building located in Jongno District of Seoul, South Korea, from 1926 to 1996.

The Government-General Building was constructed by the Empire of Japan on the site of the Gyeongbokgung complex, the royal palace of the Joseon, and was the largest government building in East Asia. The Government-General Building served as the chief administrative building of Chōsen and the seat of its governor-general in Keijō from 1926 until 1945. The Government-General Building was the scene of numerous important events after South Korean independence in 1948, becoming the seat of the National Assembly of South Korea and housing offices of the Government of South Korea until 1950 when it was damaged during the Korean War and intentionally left derelict. President Park Chung Hee restored the Government-General Building from 1962 for government functions until the early 1980s; it housed the National Museum of South Korea from 1986.

Until its demolition, the building was long felt to be a symbol of Japanese imperialism and an impediment to the reconstruction of Gyeongbokgung. The Government-General Building was controversially planned for demolition in 1993, and was eventually demolished between 1995 and 1996.

== History ==
=== Construction ===
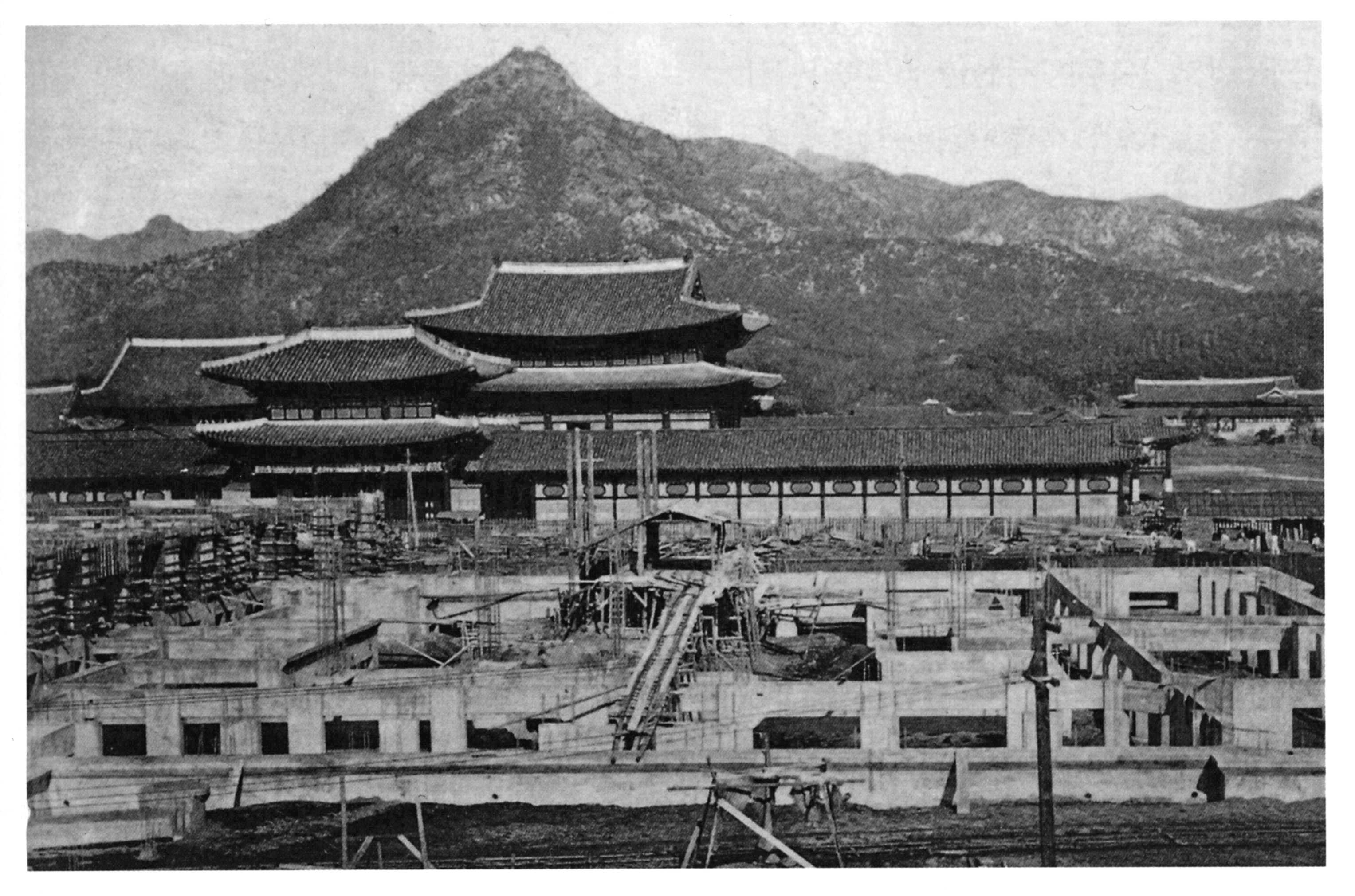
The construction site

Prior to the 1910 annexation, the Japanese Residency-General of Korea operated out of the three-story Japanese Residency-General of Korea Building on the mountain Namsan. However, that building was too small for the operations needed to manage the annexed Korea. In 1912, they finalized plans to create the Government-General of Chōsen Building at Gyeongbokgung. The decision to build it at the palace was a symbolic assertion of Japan's authority in Korea.

It was designed from 1912 to 1914 by German architect Georg de Lalande. De Lalande had lived in Japan since 1901 and had designed buildings there and in Korea until he died in 1914. After de Lalande's death, the designs were taken over by Japanese architects Ichiro Nomura and Hirushi Kunieda. Groundbreaking for the building was held on June 25, 1916. The topping out ceremony for the building was held on May 17, 1923. On October 1, 1926, a ceremony for the building's completion was held.

=== After Korean independence ===
President Syngman Rhee is sworn in at a ceremony in front of the former colonial headquarters on 24 July 1948.

Japanese rule in Korea ended upon the surrender of Japan in August 1945 and the United States occupied the territory of Korea south of the 38th parallel (including Seoul) where the United States Army Military Government in Korea was established. The US occupation government renamed the Government-General Building to Capitol Hall, and it became internationally known as the Seoul Capitol. On 31 May 1948, the Government-General Building became the seat of South Korea's Constituent National Assembly, the precursor to the National Assembly. On 24 July, the swearing in ceremony of Syngman Rhee as the first president of South Korea was held in front of the Government-General Building. On 15 August, the inauguration of the First Republic occurred at the Government-General Building following the official transfer of power from the US occupation government. The Government-General Building also became the first seat of National Assembly and was occupied by a variety of government offices.

The Government-General Building was heavily damaged following the outbreak of the Korean War in June 1950 when North Korea's Korean People's Army invaded South Korea. North Korea's forces briefly occupied the building as an army headquarters until United Nations forces recaptured Seoul in September 1950. The North Koreans set fire to the Government-General Building upon their retreat, completely destroying the interior. The building remained ruined and abandoned for the remainder of the war. President Rhee refused to either repair or reoccupy the building as its ruin was considered symbolic of the end of Japanese occupation while its outdoor space was utilized as an outdoor music hall.

Following Park Chung Hee's May 16 coup in 1961 that established the Supreme Council of National Reconstruction, the Government-General Building was restored to serve two more decades as the seat of government. On 22 November 1962, General Park carried out extensive repair and refurbishing work on the derelict Government-General Building to use it as much-needed offices for the central government. As a witness to the major political and social upheavals of modern Korean history, the building housed government offices including that of the prime minister until the early 1980s when new quarters were constructed nearby. In 1968, the Western-style front gate was demolished for the reconstruction of Gwanghwamun, the main and largest gate of Gyeongbokgung Palace. In 1970, many government offices were moved to the newly constructed Central Government Complex located adjacent to the Government-General Building.

On 25 May 1981, President Chun Doo-hwan gave instruction to move the National Museum of Korea to the Government-General Building. In 1982, the South Korean Government announced a moving plan to the people of Korea, and the project begun. After the last State Council meeting was held there on 19 May 1983, it underwent a period of refurbishment, reopening in August 1986 as the National Museum of Korea.

=== Demolition ===
The issue of the Government-General Building's future was opened after Kim Young-sam became president in 1993. In August of that year, President Kim announced that it would be demolished beginning in 1995, the 50th anniversary of the end of Japanese colonial rule and the 600th anniversary of Gyeongbokgung Palace. Plans were announced for a new National Museum to be built on the site. The Government-General Building had been subject to calls for demolition since the presidency of Rhee, almost immediately after the end of Japanese colonial rule.

The Government-General Building's demolition proposal was controversial in South Korea and there was intense public debate on the issue. President Kim and proponents of the demolition argued that the building was a symbol of Japanese imperialism that had been built deliberately to deface Gyeongbokgung Palace. Opponents of the demolition countered that South Korea, now a wealthy nation, was no longer troubled by such symbolism and that reminders of the colonial era were needed. Many opposed the demolition on the grounds of the expense incurred and the architectural merit of the existing building, as other Japanese colonial-era buildings in Seoul, such as the old Seoul Station and Seoul Metropolitan Library, are considered landmarks of the city. Additionally, the building itself was the site of important events such as the declaration of independence of South Korea. Lee Young-hoon and his co-authors later criticized the demolition in the 2019 book Anti-Japan Tribalism, describing it as “deleting the ROK's history.

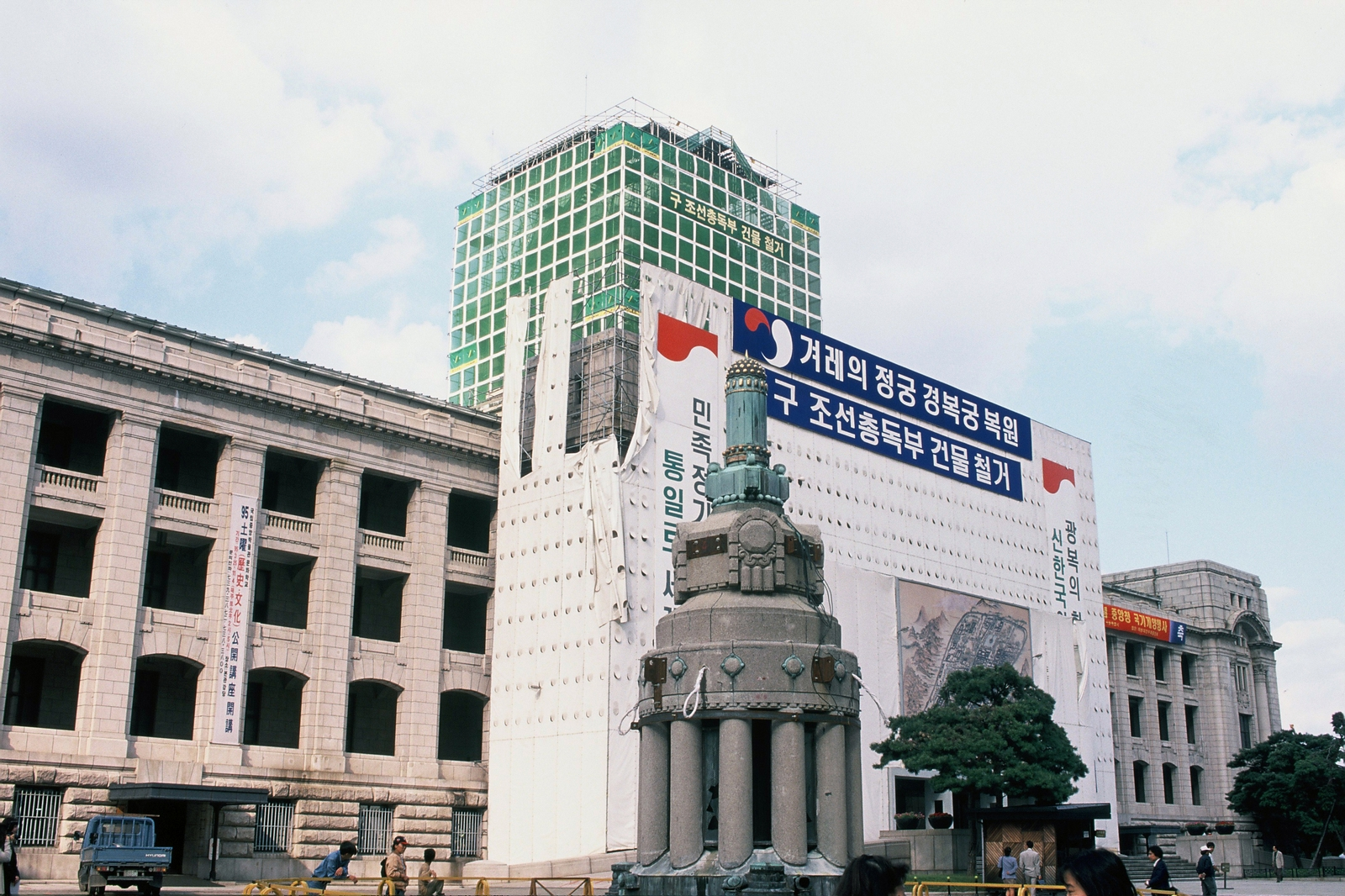
The demolition site in 1995

A proposal was made to move the Government-General Building to a new site, although this would have been far more expensive than demolition. Nevertheless, demolition began on South Korea's Liberation Day (Gwangbokjeol) on 15 August 1995, with the removal of the dome. On 13 November 1996, the building was completely demolished. Today, the roof lantern of the dome and several other recognizable pieces of the building can be seen at the Independence Hall Museum in Cheonan, as part of a monument to commemorate the history behind the building and its demolition.

The National Museum of Korea, which had no say in the debate, was evicted by the government to allow demolition of the Government-General Building to commence. Afterwards, the museum was reopened to the public in temporary accommodations in December 1996, before officially reopening in its new building in Yongsan Family Park in the Yongsan District on 28 October 2005.

== Gallery ==
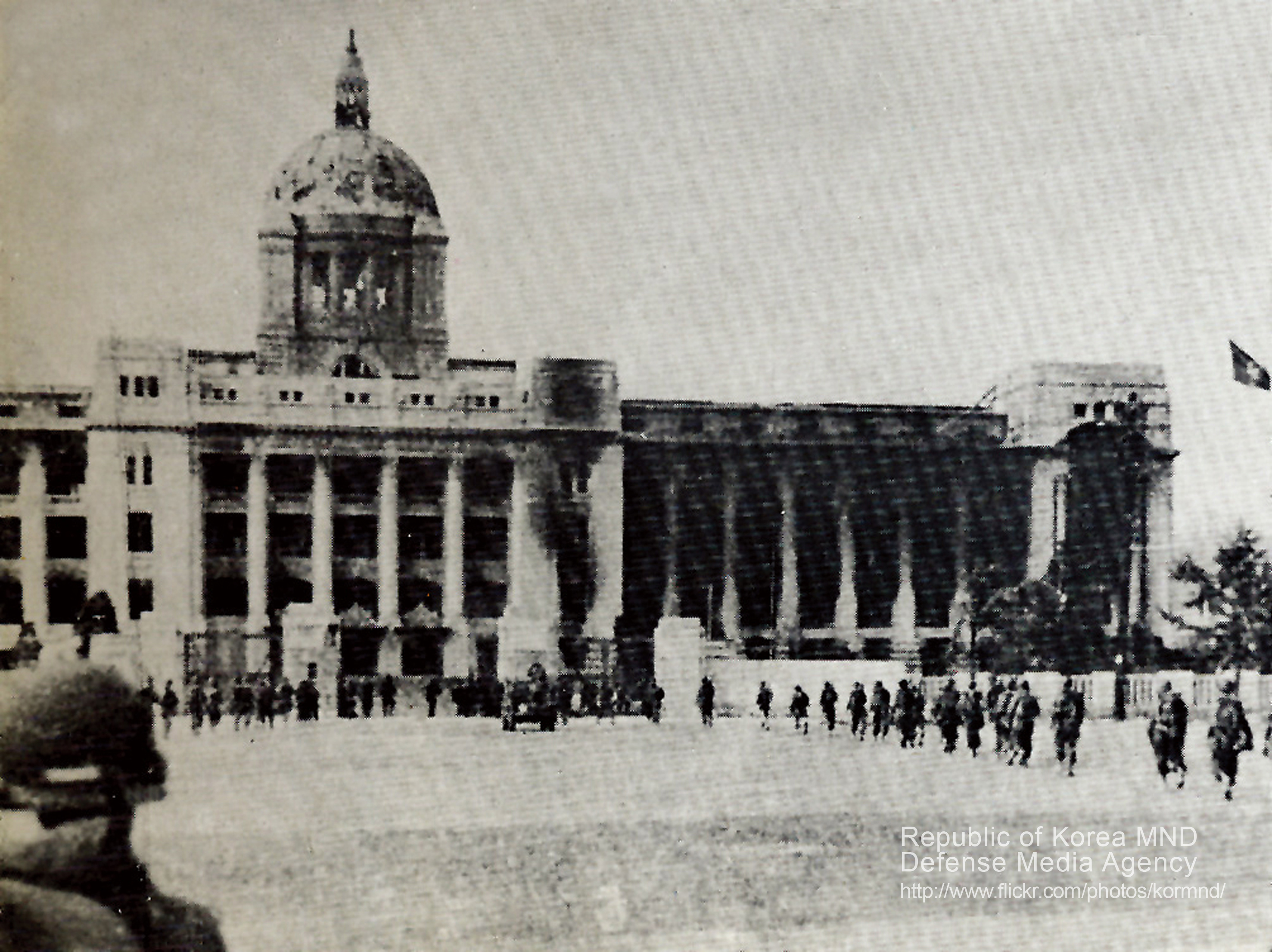
General Government Building during the Second Battle of Seoul.There is some fire damage.

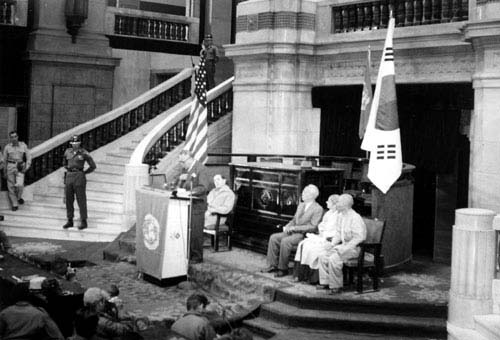
The building is used to host a ceremony on September 29, 1950, to mark the recapture of Seoul by UN forces in the Korean War.

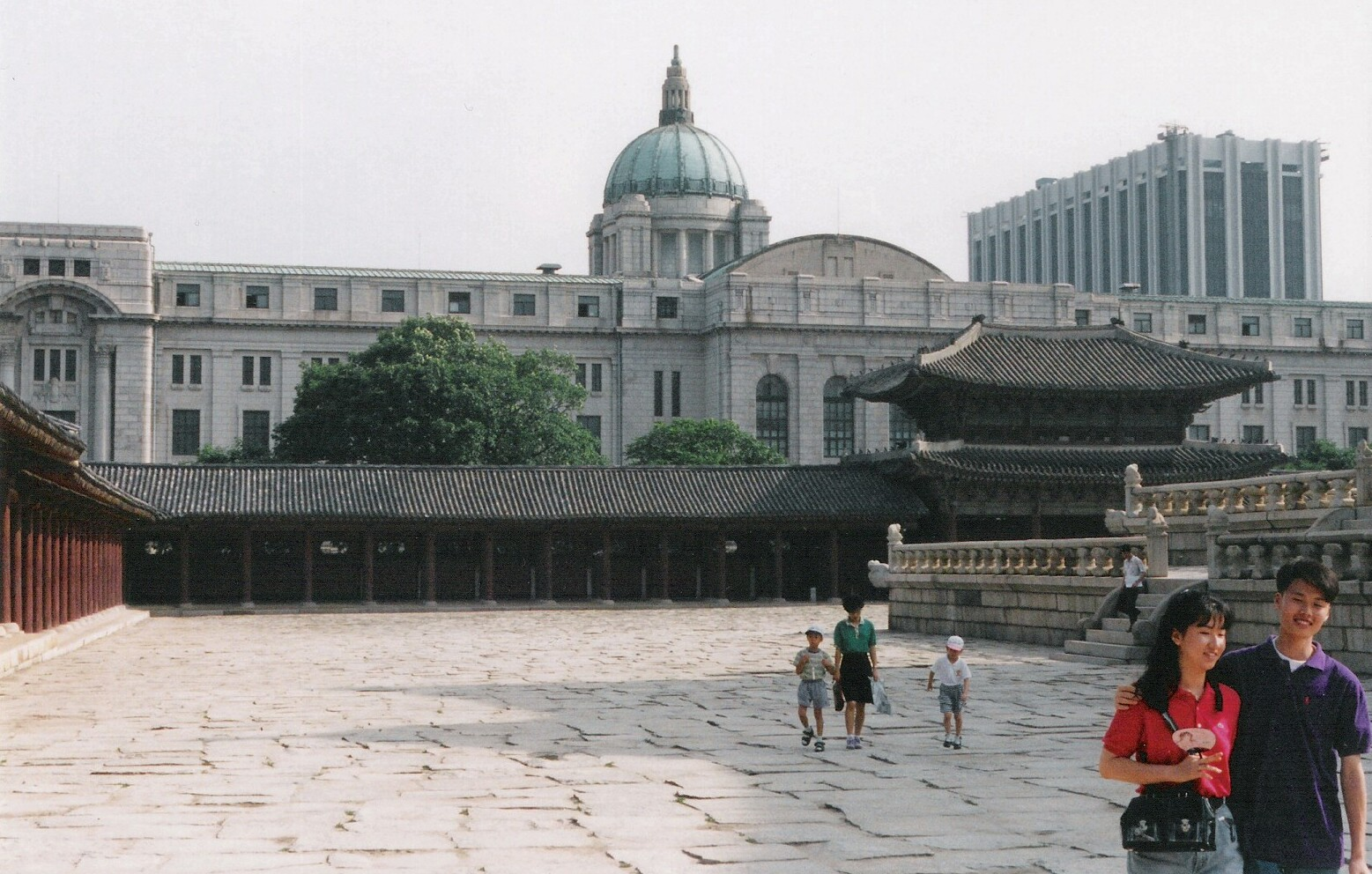
General Government Building among the Gyeongbok Palace in 1995.

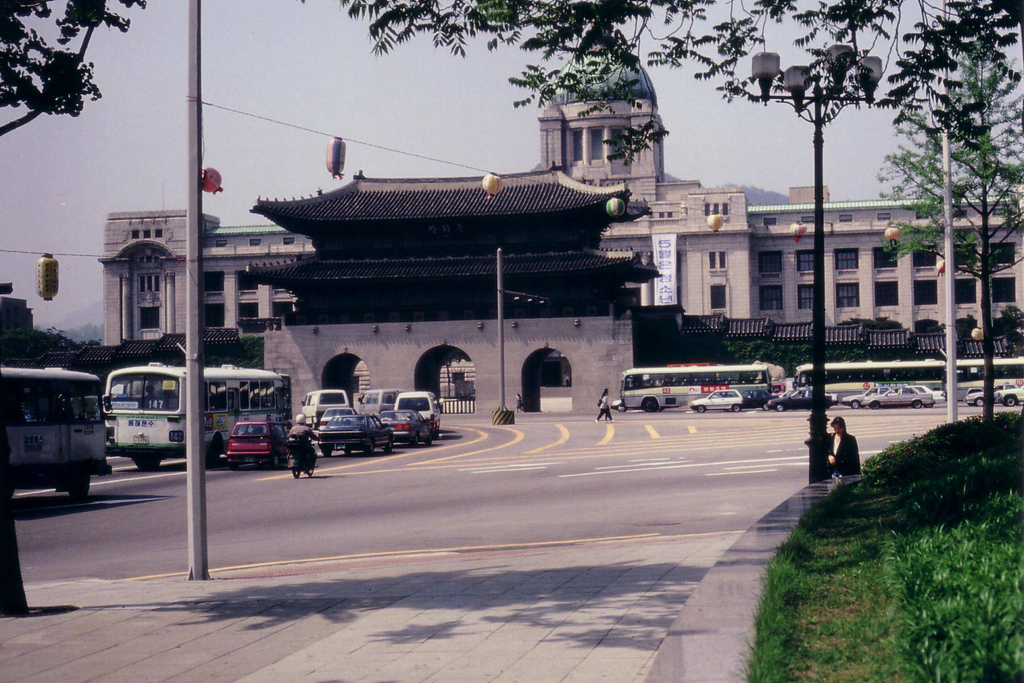
By the early 1990s mounting pressure to remove the building from central Seoul gathered momentum.

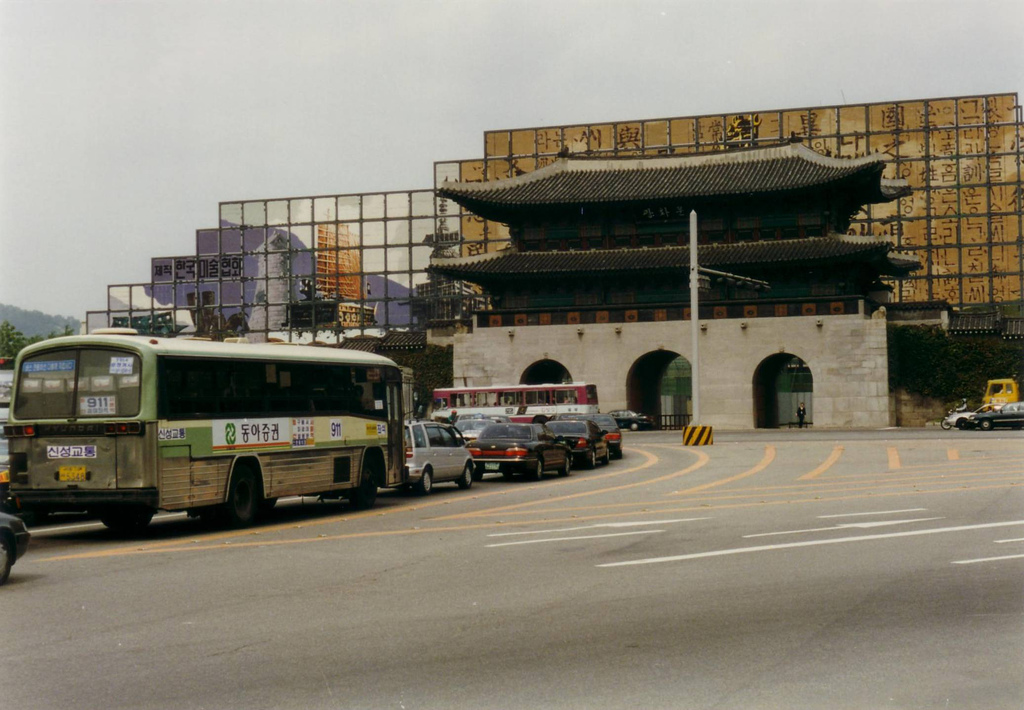
General Government Building is demolished behind a decorative screen in 1996.

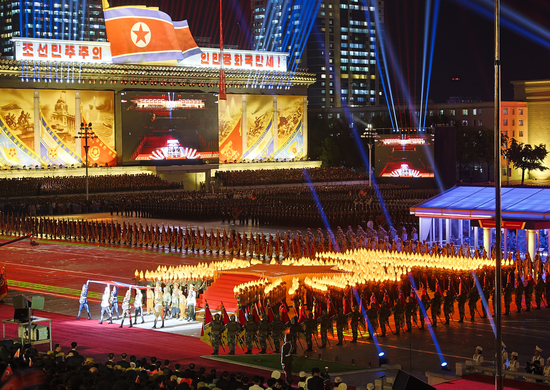
(On the left) Image of the General Government Building was presented during the July 27, 2023 parade in Pyongyang, North Korea. The parade marks 70 years since the end of the Korean War.

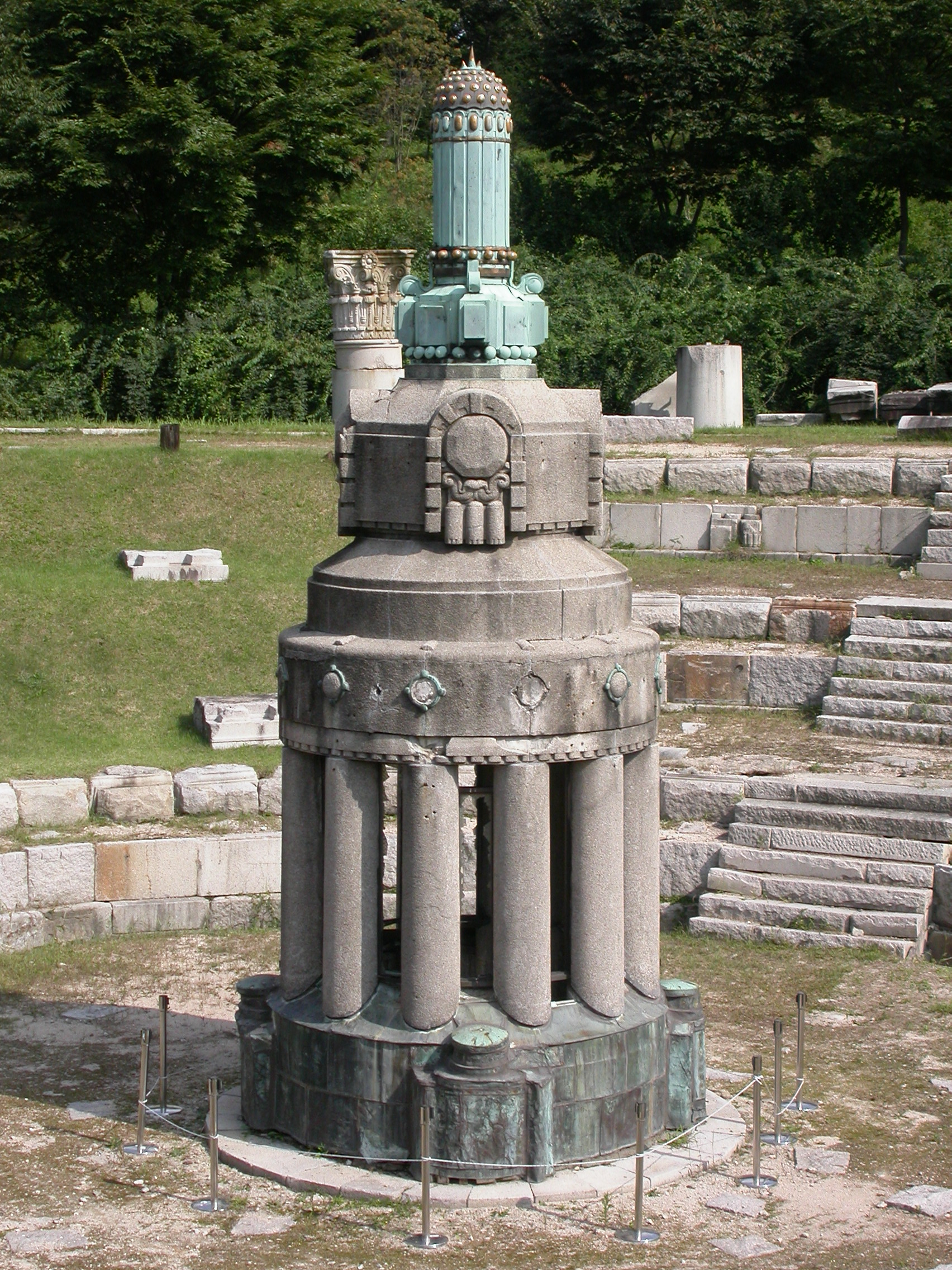
Roof lantern of the building.

== See also ==
- Gyeongbokgung Palace complex — constructed in 1394, first reconstructed in 1867, under reconstruction 1989 to present
- Presidential Office Building, Taipei
- Japanese architecture
