= Japanese Resident-General of Korea =

1905–1910 colonial position in Korea

Resident-General of Korea
- 韓国統監
- Flag of the resident-general

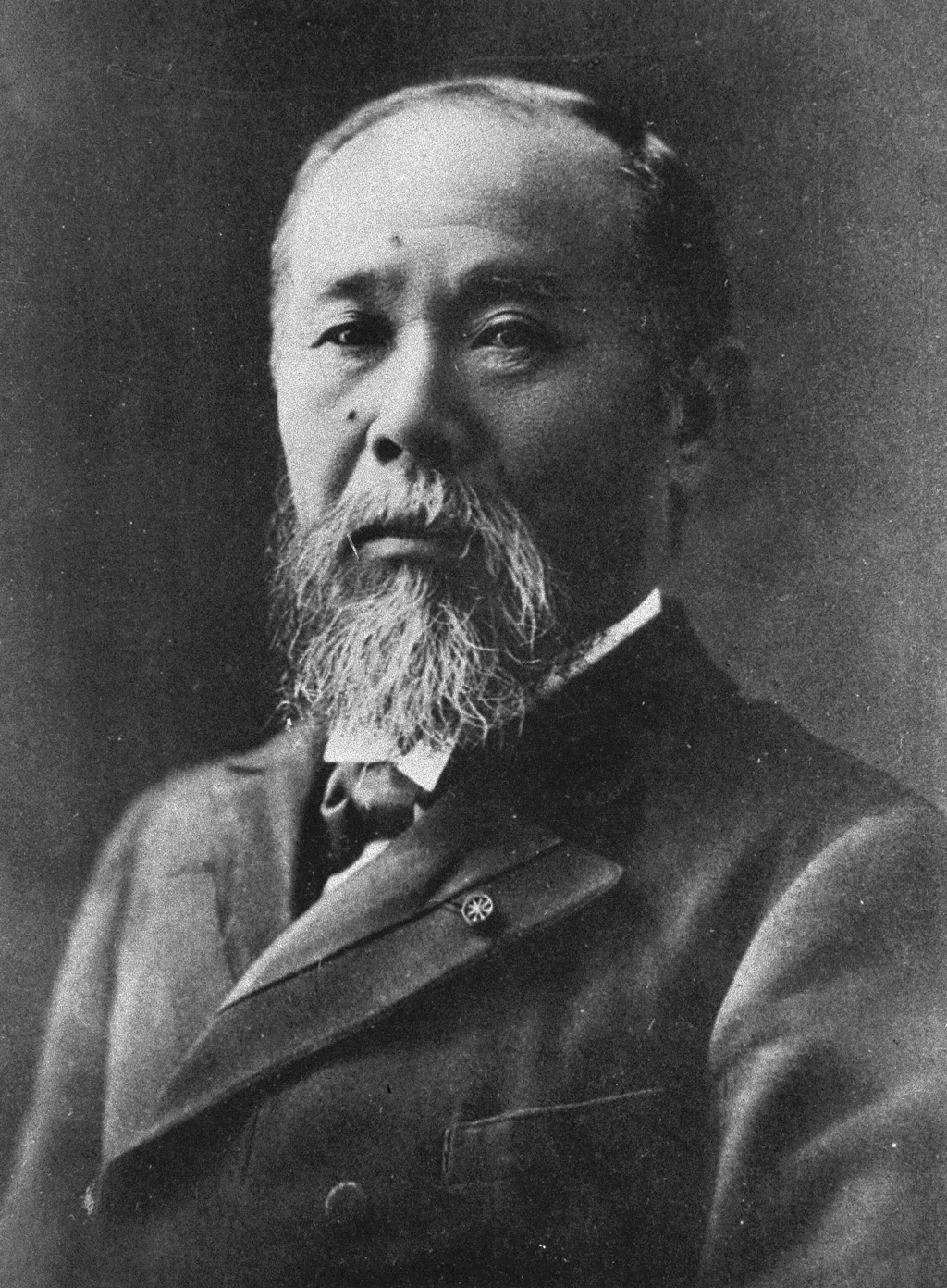
- Longest serving Itō Hirobumi; 21 December 1905 – 14 June 1909
- Type: Resident general
- Status: Abolished
- Appointer: Emperor of Japan
- Precursor: Emperor of Korea
- Formation: 21 December 1905
- First holder: Itō Hirobumi
- Final holder: Terauchi Masatake
- Abolished: 1 October 1910
- Superseded by: Governor-General of Chōsen
- Deputy: Deputy resident-general

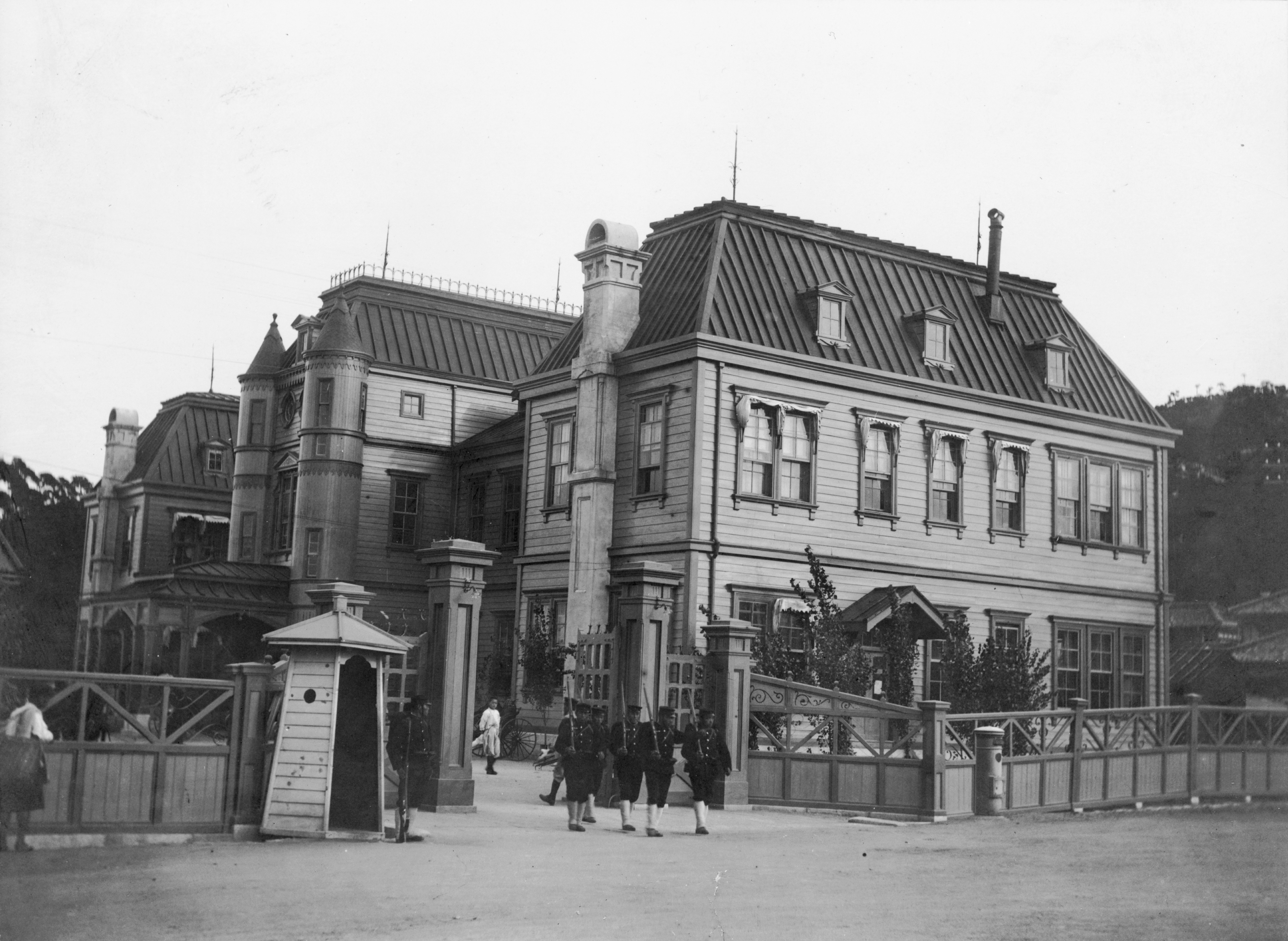
Government building, this building is called the Japanese Residency-General of Korea Building

The Japanese Resident-General of Korea (Japanese: 韓国統監, romanized: Kankokutōkan; Korean: 일본의 대 한국통감, romanized: Ilbon-ui dae hangugtong-gam) was a post overseeing the Japanese protectorate of Korea from 1905 to 1910.

== List of Japanese residents-general ==
No.	Portrait	Name (birth–death)	Term of office			Head(s) of state	Ref.
No.	Portrait	Name (birth–death)	Took office	Left office	Time in office	Head(s) of state	Ref.
1		Itō Hirobumi (1841–1909)	21 December 1905	14 June 1909	3 years, 175 days	Meiji	
2		Sone Arasuke (1849–1910)	14 June 1909	30 May 1910	350 days	Meiji	
3		Terauchi Masatake (1852–1919)	30 May 1910	1 October 1910	124 days	Meiji	

== See also ==
- Governor-General of Korea
- Governor-General of Taiwan
