= Nam Gi-nam =

South Korean film director (1942–2019)

- Hangul: 남기남
- RR: Nam Ginam
- MR: Nam Kinam

Nam Gi-Nam (April 17, 1942 – July 24, 2019) was a prolific South Korean director of movies, cartoons and TV series. Born in Gwangju, South Korea, he graduated from Sorabol Art College. He made his debut in 1972 with Don't Cry My Daughter (Naettara uljimara). The main genres in which he worked were animation, comedies, and science fiction. He was often associated with actor/director Shim Hyung-rae.

== Filmography ==
- 1972 : Don't Cry My Daughter [Naedala uljimara]
- 1977 : Mister O (Mister Zero)
- 1977 : Gate of Death and Life [Sasaengmun]
- 1978 : Jeongmumun
- 1978 : Returned Tiger [Dolaon bulbeom]
- 1978 : Horimsa Temple [Horimsa daetonggwan]
- 1979 : The Burning Solim Temple [Bultaneun solimsa]
- 1979 : The Treasure [Nomabisa]
- 1979 : Faithful Sang-yong [Sang-yong tongcheobjang]
- 1979 : Do Not Look Backward [Dwidola boji mara]
- 1979 : The Man Who Caught the Storm [Pokpungeul jabeun sanai]
- 1980 : Barefoot From Pyeongyang [Pyeongyang maenbal]
- 1980 : The Girl and the Minstrels [Muhyeob geompung]
- 1980 : A Courageous Man [Yeolbeon jjikeodo anneomeojin sanai]
- 1981 : I Know Myself [Bonjon Saengkak]
- 1981 : Three Robot Heroes [Sahyeong samgeol]
- 1981 : At the Roads [Nosangeseo]
- 1982 : A Chivalrous Man of the Geum River [Geumgang seonbeom]
- 1982 : The 37 Skills of the Golden Dragon [Geumryong 37gye]
- 1982 : For the Motherland [Chiljisu]
- 1982 : Twin Dragons [Dolaon sangyong]
- 1982 : Dragon Force
- 1983 : Man from Pyeongyang [Pyeongyang bakchigi]
- 1983 : Lady Blacksmith [Yeoja daejangjaengi]
- 1983 : Hotel at 0 Hour [Yongshi-ui hotel]
- 1984 : Noozles aka The Wondrous Koala Blinky [Fushigi na koala Blinky] (TV Series)
- 1984 : The Chase [Chujeok]
- 1984 : Great Monks of Shaolin [Solim daesa]
- 1984 : The Beggar's Song [Gakseoli pumbataryeong]
- 1984 : Ambition and Challenge [Yamanggwa dojeon]
- 1984 : Fool [Cheolbuji]
- 1985 : Three Evil Spirits [Heuksamgwi]
- 1985 : Last Year's Beggar [Jaknyeone watdeon gakseoli]
- 1985 : Shim Hyeong-Rae's Detective Story [Shim Hyung-rae ui tamjeonggyu]
- 1985 : This Is My Way of Living [Nan ireohge sandawoo]
- 1986 : Note of Heukryeong [Heukryeong tongcheobjang]
- 1986-1990 : Agi kongnyong Doolie (TV Series)
- 1986 : Night Fairy [Bamui yujeong]
- 1987 : Seven Slaps on the Cheek [Dagwi ilgobdae]
- 1987 : Adventures of the Little Koala [Jak un koala ui mohoum] (TV Series)
- 1987 : Five People [Daseot saramdeul]
- 1987 : Seoul Women [Seoul yeojareul johae]
- 1988 : Habgung
- 1989 : Foolish Lovebirds [Baekchiwonang]
- 1989 : Young-gu and Ddaeng-chiri [Young-guwa daengchili]
- 1989 : Ernie and Master Kim [Taekwon sonyeon Ernie wa Master Kim]
- 1989 : Young-Gu and Ddaeng-Chiri Go to Sorim Temple [Young-guwa daengchili solimsa gada]
- 1990 : Detective So Jeok-gung [So Jeok-gung tamjeong]
- 1990 : Superman Iljimae
- 1990 : Young-gu Rambo [Young-guwa daengchili 3tan: Young-gu Rambo]
- 1990 : Two Crazy Heroes [Byeolnan du yeongwoong]
- 1990 : Who Broke the Rose's Stem? [Nuga bulgeun jangmireul geokeotna]
- 1991 : Young-gu and Daengchili 4: Hong Kong Granny Ghost [Young-guwa daengchili 4tan: Hong Kong halmaegwishin]
- 1991 : Please Wait a Little Longer [Jogeumman chamajwoyo]
- 1992 : Love and Tears [Salanggwa nunmul]
- 1992 : The Fool and the Thief [Meojeoriwa doduknom]
- 1993 : A Surrogate Father [Shinaeri]
- 1993 : 18 Years Old [Sonyeo 18se]
- 1994 : Take Off Your Headphones [Headphoneul beosheora]
- 1998 : Zang Ku with a Hammer and Ddaeng Chiri
- 1998 : The Cemetery Under the Moon [Cheonnyeon hwansaeng]
- 1998 : Jang-gu and Daengchili [Mangchireul deun Jangguwa daengchili]
- 2003 : The Galgali Family and Dracula [Galgali familywa Dracula]
- 2005 : Baribari Jjang

== See also ==
- Contemporary culture of South Korea
- List of Korean-language films
- Korean cinema
- Korean drama
