= Yonggary (1999 film) =

1999 kaiju film by Shim Hyung-rae

- Theatrical release poster
- Directed by: Shim Hyung-rae
- Screenplay by: Park Hui-jun; Marty Poole (2001 version)
- Based on: Yongary, Monster from the Deep by Kim Ki-duk; Seo Yun-sung
- Produced by: Shim Hyung-rae; Yang Jae-hyeok; Lee Yeong-ho
- Starring: Harrison Young; Donna Phillipson; Richard B. Livingston; Brag Sergi; Briant Wells
- Cinematography: Kim An-hong
- Edited by: Ko Im-pyo
- Music by: Jo Seong-woo
- Production companies: Zero Nine Entertainment; Hyundai Capital Corp. Korea Technology Finance Corp. Sinbo Investment Corp. CKD Investment Corp. Samboo Finance Ent. Government of Suwon City
- Distributed by: Media Film International
- Release date: July 17, 1999 (Theatrical)
- Running time: 90 minutes (Theatrical); 95 minutes (2001 version)
- Country: South Korea
- Language: English
- Budget: US$13.5 million

Yonggary (Korean: 용가리; RR: Yonggari) is a 1999 English-language South Korean monster film directed by Shim Hyung-rae and is a reimagining of the character Yonggary, originating from the 1967 film Yongary, Monster from the Deep. Despite being a South Korean production, the film's principal cast consists of Western actors such as Harrison Young, Donna Phillipson, Richard B. Livingston, Briant Wells, Brad Sergi, Dan Cashman, and Bruce Cornwell.

Yonggary was released in South Korea on July 17, 1999. An alternative cut was later released with an altered plot, new footage, and updated special effects on January 20, 2001 as Yonggary: 2001 Upgrade Edition, which was distributed in North America as Reptilian. The film was considered the most expensive South Korean film produced at the time of its release.

== Plot ==
In Southeast Asia, Dr. Campbell and Dr. Hughes lead an archaeological party exploring caverns. Hughes is separated and finds an alien corpse with a fossilized diamond while Campbell uncovers hieroglyphics leading to the location of a dinosaur skeleton. Two years later, an alien mothership arrives near Earth's orbit and destroy two American satellites that get the attention of soldier Parker, who reports it to General Murdock of the United National Defense Agency (UNDA). Bud Black, a photojournalist, learns about a dinosaur dig, led by Campbell and his assistant Holly.

Hughes, who has been believed to be dead, arrives at the dig site to warn Campbell about the dinosaur's resurrection, but is quickly removed from the site. The alien ship sends beams to reanimate the dinosaur, killing several diggers. Holly confronts Campbell about the mysterious deaths and quits after Campbell refuses to launch an investigation. Hughes finds Holly and reveals to her about the legend of Yonggary, the alien fossil, additional hieroglyphics, and that he was held by the U.S. government as a "guest" for the last two years. She initially dismisses his claims, but comes around after he shows her classified data concerning the alien fossil.

They return to the dig site to stop Campbell, but arrive too late when the alien ship fully resurrects Yonggary, killing Campbell in the process. The alien ship dematerializes Yonggary. Both Holly and Hughes are taken into custody by Parker. Yonggary is then teleported before them and escape before a helicopter squadron engages Yonggary in battle, only to be defeated. The National Space Investigation Agency (NSIA) send Stanley Mills to share information regarding the aliens with General Murdock and General Howell. Mills explains that a paleontologist provided the NSIA with scientific evidence that an alien civilization visited the Earth 200 million years ago and that vital information in defeating the aliens was stolen. Mills recommends to capture the aliens alive, but Howell wishes to destroy them. Yonggary is then teleported to Los Angeles and proceeds to attack.

Upon arriving at the UNDA base, Hughes and Holly are confronted by Mills, who reveals that Hughes was the paleontologist who shared his discoveries and later stole information from their lab. Hughes counters that he warned the NSIA but chose to ignore him. Mills attempts to take the stolen data disc back but fails and is detained. The US President gives the UNDA five hours to defeat Yonggary or will launch a nuclear strike. Murdock orders General Thomas to dispatch his experimental Project T Forces, led by Parker, to attack Yonggary.

Hughes and Holly decode the additional hieroglyphics and uncover that the aliens are controlling Yonggary through a diamond-shaped receptor on his forehead and that "another great light will be sent to do battle." Failing to defeat Yonggary in time, the President sends a bomber to kill Yonggary, to the delight of Mills. The T-Forces manage to break the aliens' control over Yonggary. Mills tries to convince Murdock to kill him but is ignored, which forces Mills to jam the UNDA's radars unless they let him leave. Mills fails and is arrested. The aliens send a new monster, Cycor, to battle Yonggary. Cycor initially gets the upper hand, but Yonggary emerges victorious in the end, forcing the aliens to flee. The generals manage to stop the bomber at the last minute and the following morning, the UNDA transports Yonggary to a deserted island, where he can live in peace.

== Cast ==
- Harrison Young as Dr. Wendel Hughes
- Donna Phillipson as Holly Davis
- Richard B. Livingston as Dr. Campbell
- Briant Wells as Parker
- Brad Sergi as Bud Black
- Wiley Picket as Lt. O'Neil
- Dan Cashman as General George Murdock
- Dennis Howard as General Jack Thomas
- Matt Landers as General Howell
- Bruce Cornwell as Stanley Mills
- Johanna Parker as Sgt. Romiski
- Alex Walters as Sgt. Michaels
- Karl Calhoun as Sgt. Andrews
- Derrick Costa as Sgt. Archie
- Les Brandt as Sgt. Sanchez
- Alan Grifka as Sgt. Smitty
- Marvin Poole as Pvt. Lewis

== Production ==
Yonggary and Cycor's suits were produced and used during filming but were replaced with CGI during post-production.

In addition to receiving financial support from the Hyundai Capital Corp. and Korean Technology Finance Corp., the film received financial and technical support from the Korean government (and the government of Suwon) by allowing the filmmakers access to military bases, hardware, and locations such as the Historic War Museum in Seoul, a location where filming has never been permitted before. The film utilized 124 miniatures and the designers spent 6 months designing Yonggary. Sculptures of the monsters were made in 6 months which were then scanned to digital screens for 3D work. Suits were produced for the monsters but were replaced with computer-generated imagery during post-production. The film was in production for 18 months and resulted in 45 minutes of computer graphics.

=== 2001 Upgrade Edition ===
After the film's successful opening, the filmmakers decided to expand the film with additional CG effects, new sets, a slightly different story, and additional characters, and began reshooting in December 1999. This version would later be released in early 2001 as Yonggary: 2001 Upgrade Edition and as Reptilian for its North American home video release.

== Release ==
Posters used at Cannes in 1998

=== Marketing ===
In 1998, a two-minute preview titled Yonggary 1998 was produced and shown at the Cannes Film Festival for potential international distributors, which generated interest from Warner Bros. and United International Pictures. Before entering production, the film was pre-sold at $2.72 million after signing nine contracts of copyrights with Germany, Poland, Thailand, Turkey, and others. Yonggary was given coverage in magazines that were published during the festival.

=== Theatrical ===
Yonggary was released in South Korea on July 17, 1999. The film opened at the Korean Culture Center in Seoul, the first time a film premiered at the center, and sold 120,000 admissions on its opening day and 1 million admissions during its opening weekend. The film was released in 85 theaters in South Korea, the highest number for any movie released in South Korea at the time. The film was considered the most expensive South Korean film produced at the time of its release.

The film was later re-released on January 20, 2001 with updated special effects and an altered plot as Yonggary: 2001 Upgrade Edition; however, the re-release was a critical and commercial flop.

=== Home media ===
The 2001 version was released on DVD by Columbia Tristar on August 21, 2001 as Reptilian. Columbia Tristar later released the film on VHS on March 5, 2002.

=== Reception ===
Chuck Arrington from DVD Talk gave the film a mixed review, criticizing the film's acting and dialogue, calling it "painful", but also wrote that the film was funny enough to merit renting it. StompTokyo.com gave the film a negative review, criticizing the film's poor quality special effects, calling it "cartoonish". In his book VideoHound's Golden Movie Retriever, Jim Craddock awarded the film one out of four bones, noting that the film should have ended once the military defeats Yonggary.
