= Night Fairy =

- Film poster
- Hangul: 밤의 요정
- Hanja: 밤의 妖精
- RR: Bamui yojeong
- MR: Pamŭi yojŏng
- Directed by: Nam Ki-nam
- Written by: Yoo Ji-hoeng
- Produced by: Jeong Do-hwan
- Starring: Choi Myung-gil; Lee Moo-jung; Kim Dong-hyeon
- Cinematography: Choe Chan-gu
- Edited by: Hyeon Dong-chun
- Music by: Lee Jong-sik
- Distributed by: Shin Han Films Co., Ltd.
- Release date: October 25, 1986 (South Korea)
- Running time: 95 minutes
- Country: South Korea
- Language: Korean

Night Fairy (Korean: 밤의 요정; RR: Bamui yojeong) is a 1986 South Korean film directed by Nam Ki-nam.

== Synopsis ==
A story about a botanist who falls into the clutches of a mysterious mountain family.

== Cast ==
- Choi Myung-gil
- Lee Moo-jung
- Kim Dong-hyeon
- Park Dong-yong
- Jin Bong-jin
- Song Kyun-chul
- Seong Mi-jin
- Oh Young-hwa
- You Gyeong-ae
- Gil Dal-ho
