= Kim Cheong-gi =

South Korean filmmaker

- Hangul: 김청기
- Hanja: 金青基
- RR: Gim Cheonggi
- MR: Kim Ch'ŏnggi

Kim Cheong-gi (Korean: 김청기; born April 4, 1941) is a South Korean director of animated, fantasy, and science fiction films.

His most well known work, Robot Taekwon V (1976), is considered one of the milestones of Korean animation. With actor Shim Hyung-rae, he created the Ureme series, one of the more popular Korean children's series of the late 1980s.

== Partial filmography ==
- Robot Taekwon V (animated) (1976)
- Robot Taekwon V 3 (로보트 태권 V 3탄: 수중특공대) (animated) (1977)
- Golden Wing 123 (황금날개 123) (animated) (1978)
- Robot Taekwon V and Golden Wing 123 (animated) (1978)
- Run, Wonder Princess! (날아라 원더공주) (1978)
- Tale of Three Kingdoms (삼국지) (animated) (1980)
- Super Taekwon V (수퍼 태권브이) (animated) (1982)
- Wuroemae from the Outside (우뢰매 = 'Wuroemae,' or 'Ureme,' 'Uremae,' 'Uroi-mae,' etc.) (외계에서 온 우뢰매) (1986)
- Space Gundam V (animated) (1983)
- Wuroemae from the Outside, Part II (1986)
- Operation of Alien Uremae (1987)
- Wuroemae 4: Thunder V Operation (1987)
- Super Hong Gil-Dong (슈퍼 홍길동) (1987)
- New Machine Uremae 5 (1988)
- Guru Kong-cho and Super Hong Kil-Dong 2 (공초도사와 슈퍼 홍길동 제2탄) (1988)
- Bioman (바이오맨) (1989)
- The Third Generation Uremae 6 (1989)
- Super Hong Kil-Dong 3 (슈퍼 홍길동 3) (1989)
- Samtos and Daengki Ddoli (삼토스와 댕기똘이) (1990)
- Robot Tae Kwon V 90 (로보트 태권브이 90) (1990)
- Space Police of the Human Power (우주경찰 휴먼 파워)
- Ureme 7: The Return of Ureme (1992)
- Gag Unit Robot Twins (개그특공대 로봇트윈스) (1993)
- Ureme 8 (우뢰매 8) (1993)
- Queen Esther (왕후 에스더) (1996)
- Lim Keok Jeong, Korean Robin Hood (의적 임꺽정) (1997)
- Kwanggeto Taewang (The Great Emperor) (Canceled)
