= Ureme (film series) =

South Korean film series

Ureme (Korean: 우뢰매; RR: Uroemae) is series of Korean children's science-fiction films created by Kim Cheong-gi and originally starring Shim Hyung-rae as the titular hero. The series began in 1986 and released 6 films by 1989. The sixth Ureme film starred Han Jeong-ho as the lead role, but Shim Hyung-Rae would return to star in Ureme 7, which was directed by Lim Jong-ho but written and produced by Kim Cheong-gi.

Ureme 8 was released in 1993, reuniting Kim Cheong-gi as director and Shim Hyung-Rae as the lead role. The series ended in that year with Ureme 9.

== Films ==
- Ureme from Beyond (August 5, 1986)
- Ureme from Beyond, Part 2 (December 20, 1986)
- Operation of Alien Ureme (July 17, 1987)
- Ureme 4: Thunder V Operation (December 26, 1987)
- New Machine Ureme 5 (July 16, 1988) is the fifth in the Ureme series, starring Shim Hyung-rae.
- The Third Generation Ureme 6 (July 20, 1989)
- Ureme 7: The Return of Ureme (December 25, 1992)
- Ureme 8: Esperman and Ureme 8 (March 30, 1993)
- Ureme 9: Ureme the Invincible Fighter (June 8, 1993)
