= Namsan =

Mountain in Seoul, South Korea

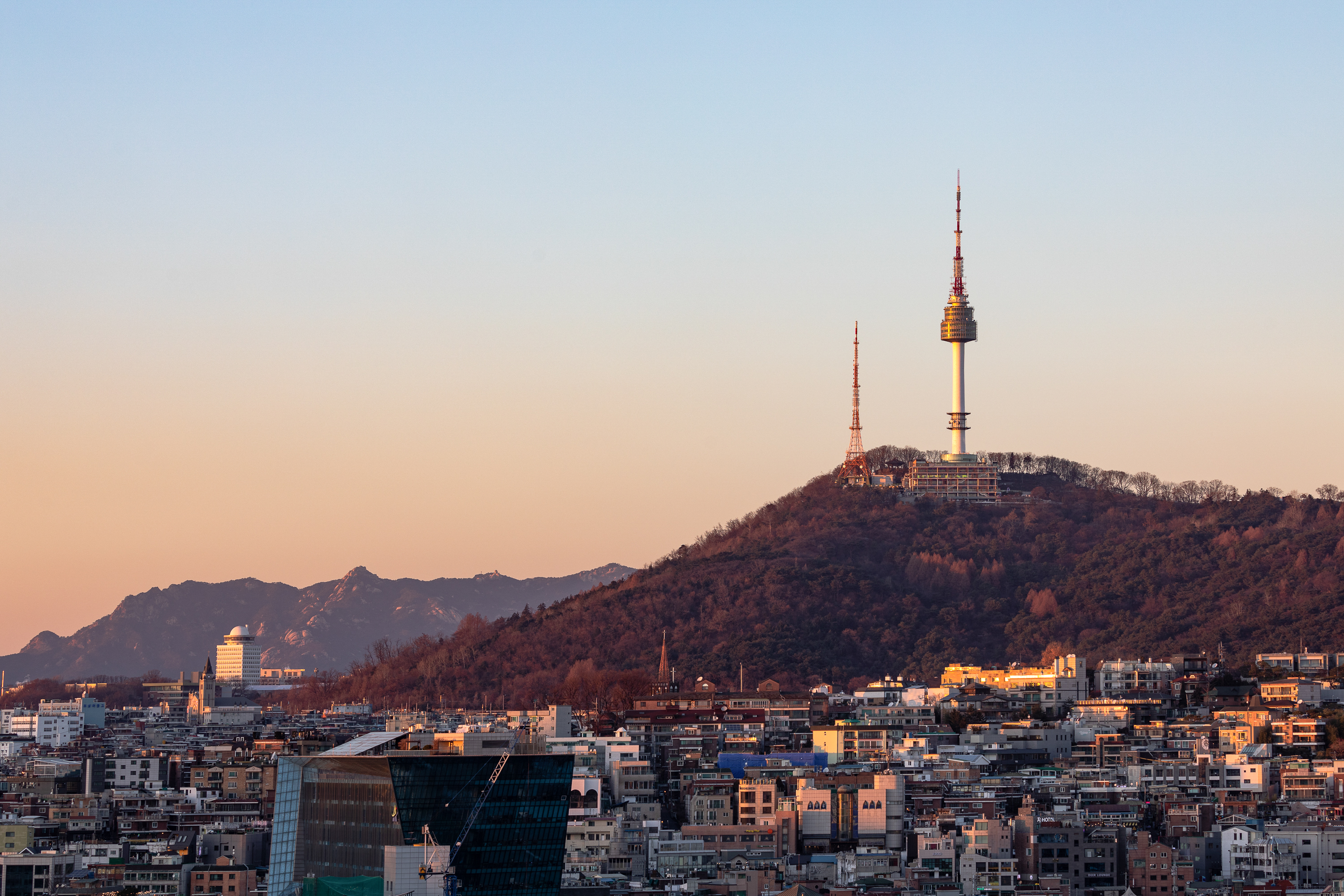
- Namsan at dusk

Highest point
- Elevation: 270 m (890 ft)
- Coordinates: 37°32′59″N 126°59′31″E

Geography
- Location: Jung District, Seoul, South Korea

Korean name
- Hangul: 남산
- Hanja: 南山
- RR: Namsan
- MR: Namsan

Namsan (Korean: 남산; lit. 'South Mountain') is a 270-metre-high (890 ft) peak in Jung District, Seoul, South Korea. It was also known as Mongmyeoksan (목멱산; 木覓山) in the past. It offers some hiking, picnic areas and views of downtown Seoul's skyline. Namsan Seoul Tower is located at the summit of Namsan.

The mountain and its surrounding area is Namsan Park, a public park maintained by the city government, which has panoramic views of Seoul. It is also the location of a smoke signal station called Mongmyeoksan Beacon Tower (목멱산 봉수대), which was part of an emergency communication system during much of Seoul's history until 1985. From 1925 to 1945 the Shinto shrine known as Chōsen Shrine was situated on Namsan. This is also where the Japanese Residency-General of Korea Building was from 1906-1962 when it was demolished

In 2011, a survey was conducted by Seoul Development Institute, which included 800 residents and 103 urban planners and architects. It ranked Namsan as the most scenic location in Seoul by 62.8 percent of residents and 70.9 percent of the experts surveyed.

== Tourist attractions ==
- Namsan Seoul Tower: The tower's height reaches 480 metres (1,570 ft) above sea level.
- Namsangol Hanok Village: Seoul restored 9,790 hectares (24,180 acres) of terrain which had been damaged for a long time and rejuvenated the traditional garden, and relocated and restored five Traditional Hanok buildings.
- Namsan cable car: It was the first cable car facility in Korea. It was first opened on 12 May 1962, and is the longest-continuously-running cable car in Korea.

== In popular culture ==
The park and the fountain were used as the filming location for Seoul Broadcasting System (SBS)'s drama Lovers in Paris.

Namsan is mentioned in the second verse of South Korea's National Anthem.

== Gallery ==
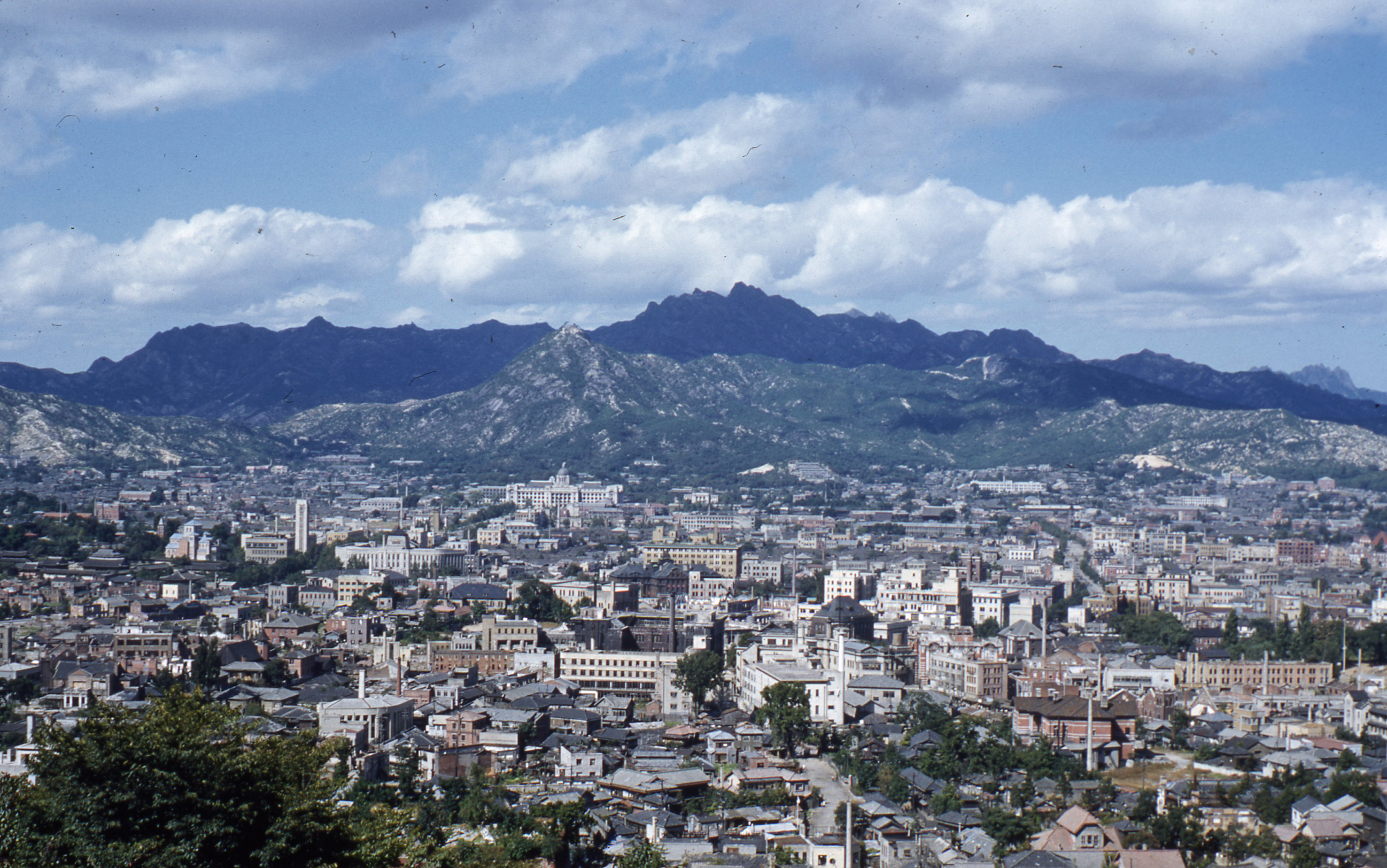
View from the mountain, facing north (1953)

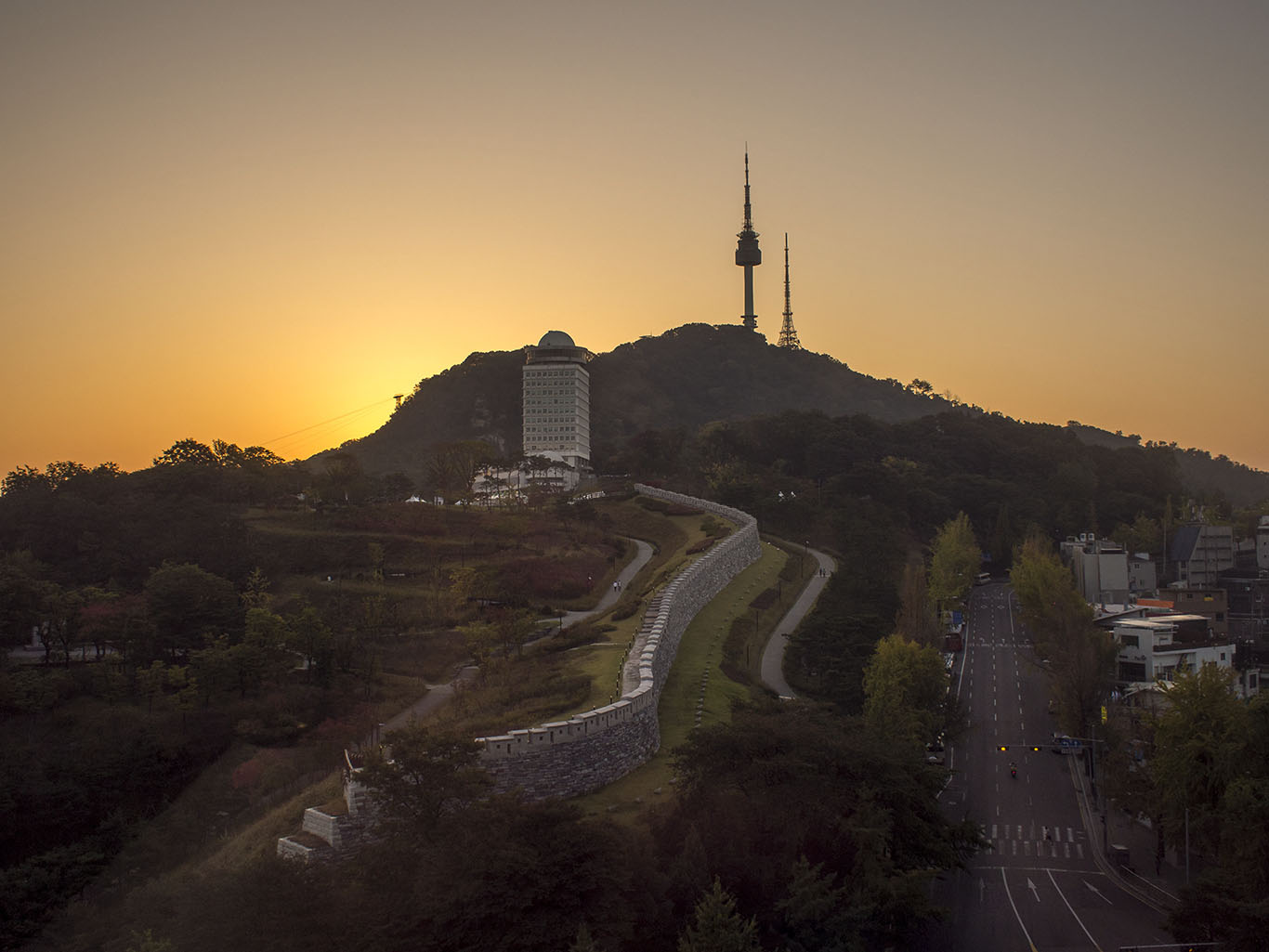
The mountain at dusk (2014)

The mountain (2018)

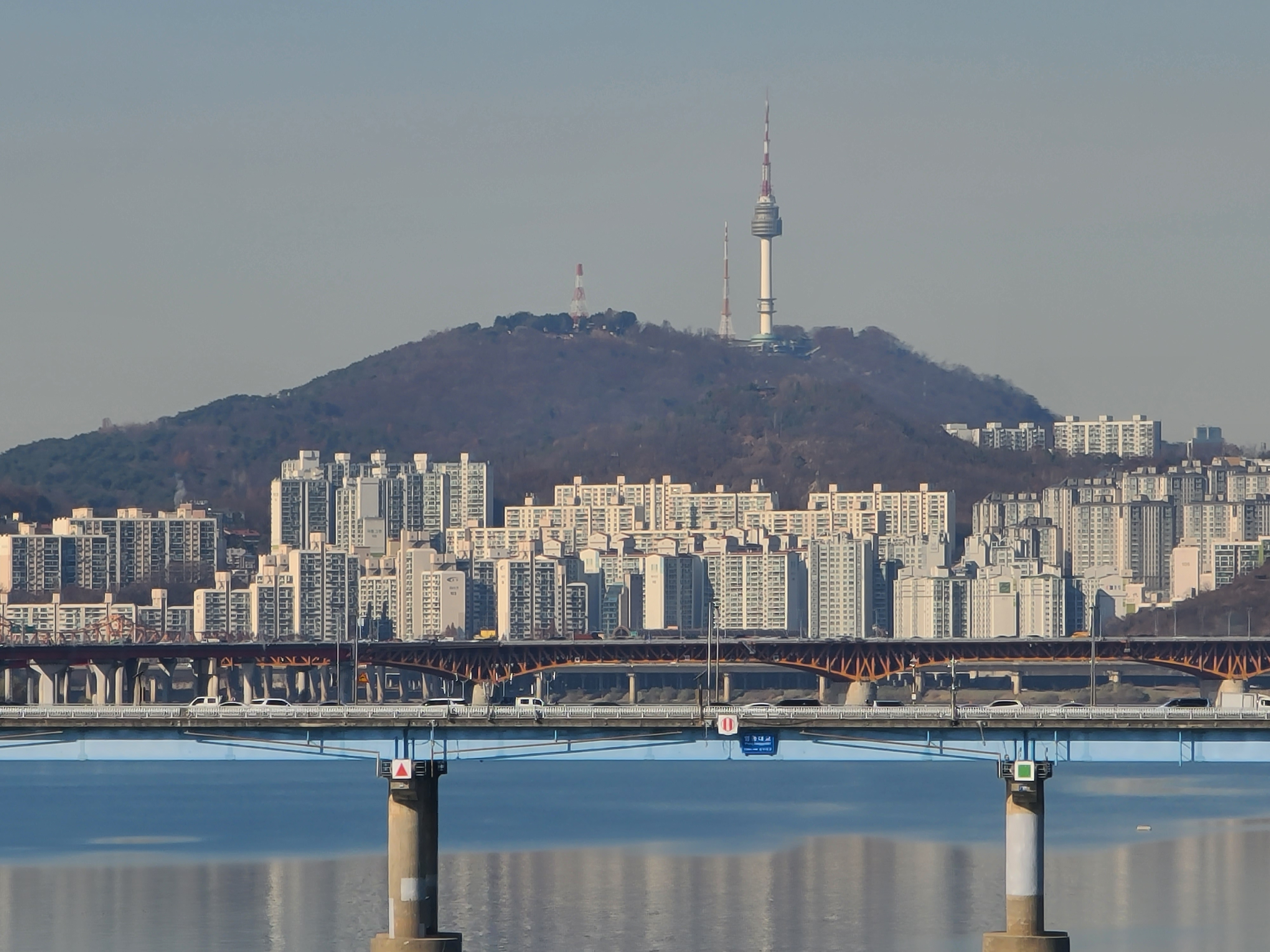
The mountain from the south bank of the Han River (2022)

== See also ==
- List of mountains in Korea
- List of parks in Seoul
