= Shim Hyung-rae =

South Korean comedian and filmmaker (born 1958)

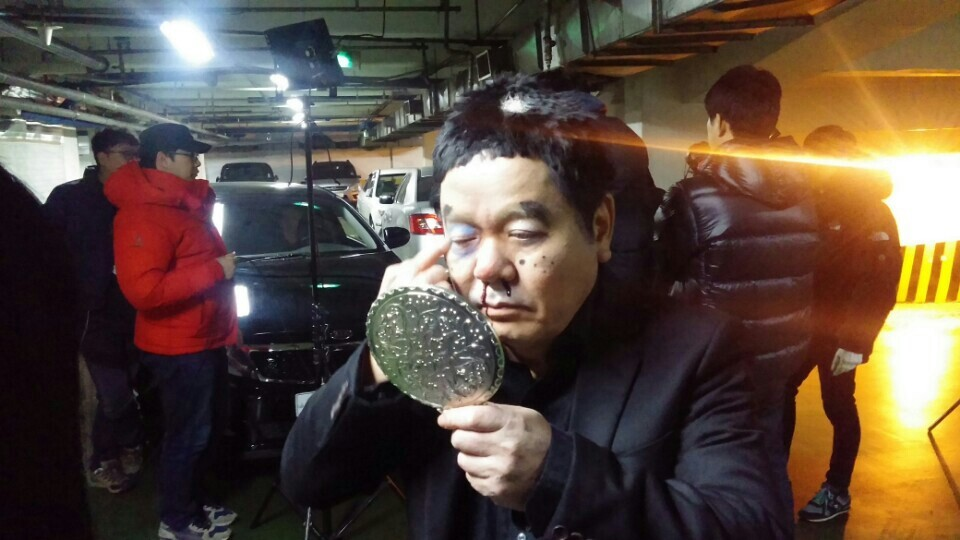
- Shim in 2015
- Born: January 3, 1958 (age 68); Seoul, South Korea
- Other names: Yeong-Goo; Younggu; Zero-Nine 영구; 009년
- Occupations: Comedian; actor; film director; screenwriter; film producer
- Years active: 1982–2010

Korean name
- Hangul: 심형래
- Hanja: 沈炯來
- RR: Sim Hyeongrae
- MR: Sim Hyŏngnae

Shim Hyung-rae (Korean: 심형래; born January 3, 1958, sometimes credited as Hyung Rae Shim) is a South Korean former comedian and filmmaker best known for directing Yonggary and D-War, by far the most expensive Korean movie in history. He has often worked with fellow directors Nam Gi-nam and Kim Cheong-gi.

== Career ==
Shim Hyung-rae began his career debuting as a comedian in 1982 with the Korean Broadcasting System and won the KBS Best Comedian of the Year Award in 1988. In 1990, he received the KBS Performer of the Year Award, with over 90 motion picture appearances, and as a producer. In 1993, he established Younggu Art(Zeronine Entertainment) and released Younggu and Dinosaur Z uZ u as director and lead actor. Shim directed eight films from 1994 to 1999 starring in most of them. He was given the New Intellectual Award for being 'a model for the new millenium’ in 1999, and the same year Asiaweek selected him as a Leader of the Millenium Society and Culture.

== Selected filmography ==
=== As a director ===
- The Last Godfather (라스트 갓파더, The Dumb Mafia) (2010)
- D-War (디 워 Dragon War) (2007)
- Yonggary (용가리 Yong-gari) (1999)
- Dragon Tuka (드래곤 투카 Deuraegon Tuka) (1996)
- The Power King (파워킹 Paweo King) (1995)
- Tirano's Claws (티라노의 발톱 Tirano-ui Baltop) (1994)
- Pinky Can (핑크빛 깡통 Pingkibit Ggang-tong) (1994)
- Young-Goo and Dinosaur Zu-Zu (영구와 공룡 쭈쭈 Yeong-gu wa gongnyong Jju-jju ) (1993)

=== As an actor ===
- The Dumb Mafia (라스트 갓파더, The Last Godfather) (2010)
- Ureme 8 (1993)
- An Idiot and a Thief (머저리와 도둑놈 Meojeoriwa Doduknom) (1992)
- Ureme 7: The Return of Ureme우뢰매 7:돌아온 우뢰매 (Ulemae 7: Dolaon Ulemae) (1992)
- Spark Man (스파크맨 Seupakeumaen) (1988)
- Slap on the Cheek Several Times (따귀 일곱대 Kka-gwi-ilgopdae) (1987)
- New Machine Uremae 5 (뉴머신 우뢰매 (제5탄) Nyu Meosin Uroemae (Je 5 tan) (1988)
- Wuroemae 4: Thunder V Operation (우뢰매 4탄 썬더브이 출동 Uroemae 4 tan Sseondeo-beu-i) (1987)
- Operation of Alien Uremae (외계에서 온 우뢰매 전격쓰리작전 Oegye-eseo On Uroemae Jeon-gyeongsseurijakjeon) (1987)
- A Journey (여로 Yoro) (1986)
- Wuroemae from the Outside, Part II (외계에서 온 우뢰매 2 Oegye-eseo On Uroemae 2) (1986)
- Wuroemae from the Outside (외계에서 온 우뢰매 Oegye-eseo On Uroemae) (1986)
- Beggar of the Last Year (작년에 왔던 각설이 Jaknyeon-e Watdeon Gakseori) (1985)
- Beggar's Song (각설이 품바타령 Gakseori Pumbataryeong) (1984)

=== Variety shows ===
- 2010: Running Man (SBS)
- 2020: King of Mask Singer (MBC)
