= Shinto in Korea =

Religion in Korea

The origins of Shinto in Korea are primarily a result of Japan's incursions since an unbalanced treaty in 1876. Shinto's rise in Korea is directly associated with the Japanese government's ideological use of the traditional folk practices of Japan, later described as "State Shinto." As Japan expanded its control of Korea, it also expanded the number of shrines, with the aim of one national shrine in each province. Before 1945, attendance at shrines was in many cases compulsory.

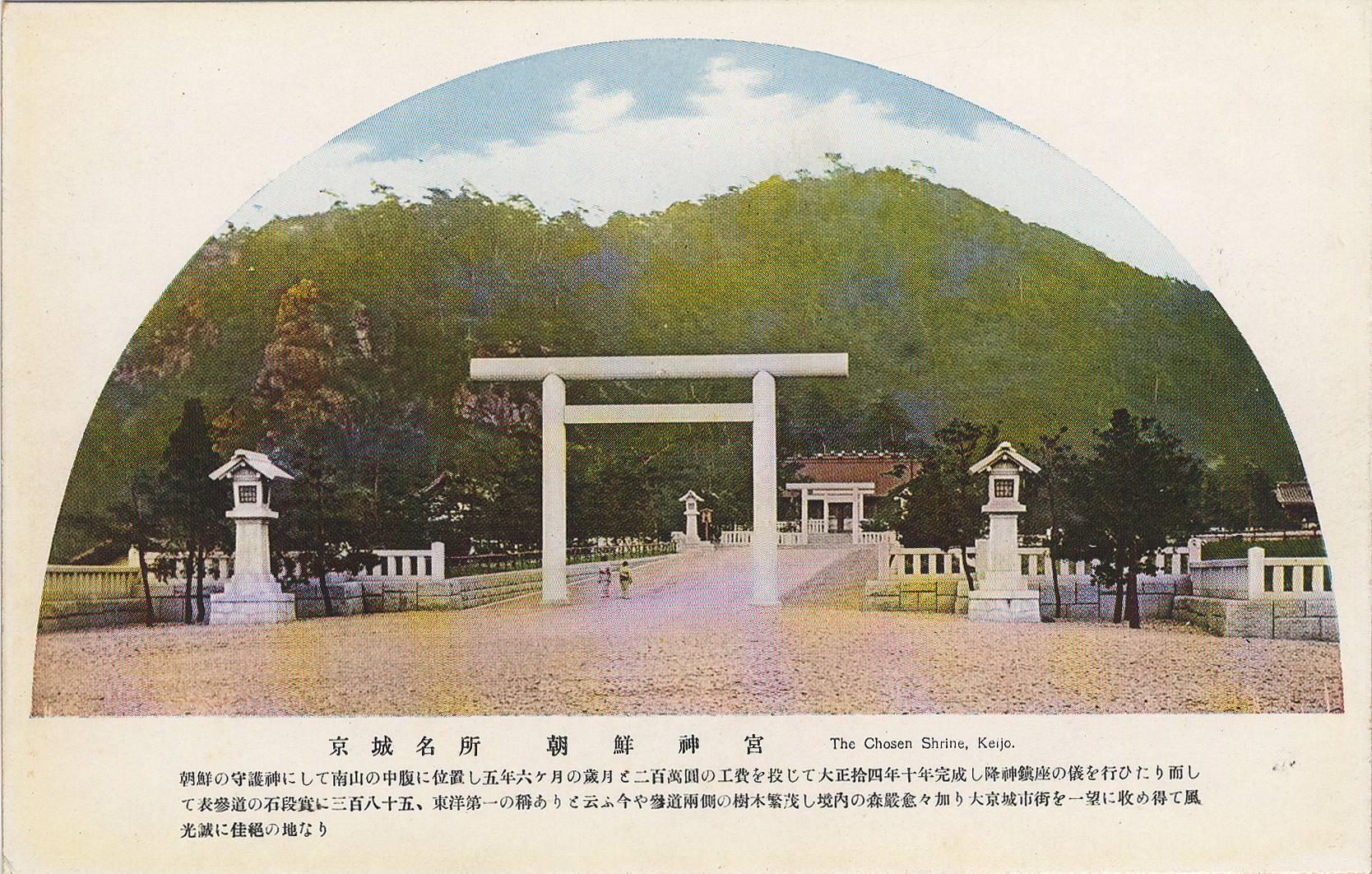
Early 20th century Japanese postcard showing the Chōsen Shrine in Seoul (1925-1945)

== Introduction of Shinto ==
Japan's Meiji restoration had been actively rejecting any relationship between Shinto, the folk tradition of Japan, and religious belief. Imperial Japan interpreted Shinto as a "suprareligious" institution based on a set of traditions, rather than moral instructions. As such, requirements to participate in Shinto ceremonies were not deemed to be a violation of the Meiji-era's freedom of religion doctrine. This was the position of the state, later described as "State Shinto," and not necessarily followed by priests or practitioners of Shinto.

=== Introduction of shrines ===
The earliest Shinto shrine in Korea is believed to be Kotohira shrine (金刀比羅神社), later Ryūtōsan Shrine (龍頭山神社), built in 1678, built by workers of the local Japan House trade office. Such shinto may have served a purpose of expressing and maintaining a Japanese identity outside of Japan, while the Japanese and Korean people lived relatively close during this period.

In 1876, the Japan–Korea Treaty of Amity introduced Japanese settlers, and Shinto proselytizers, to Incheon, Pusan, and Wonsan. As Japanese traders arrived in these ports, they brought Shinto practices with them. For example, Genzan shrine (元山神社), in Wonsan, was constructed in 1882, and was later elevated to National Shrine status by the Japanese in 1936. By 1911, Daijingū (大神宮), Sugawara Tenmangū (菅原天滿宮), and Konpira Jinja (金比羅神社) shrines had been established, ostensibly for the practice of Japanese nationals living there. Other active groups included Konkōkyō (金光教), Tenrikyō (天理教), Ontake-kyō (御岳教), and Shinrikyō (神理教).

After the Japan-Korea treaty of 1910, Korea was fully under Japanese rule. In turn, the Governor-General responsible for managing Korea for Imperial Japan was empowered to expand the use of shrines there. A year later, a police report on shrine activities in Korea stated that "shrines are established for the purpose of the protection of local areas, and are deeply revered among many residents. Shrines are managed along with other civic groups by the local association of Japanese residents."

In 1913, to mark the anniversary of the occupation, members of the Korean royal family presented an offering to Amaterasu at Keijō Shrine in Seoul, signaling their subordination to the Japanese government. Meanwhile, Japanese expatriates at this time were protective of Japanese customs, and reluctant to engage or inform Koreans about shrine practices, despite government orders to promote them, and the Japanese government struggled to incorporate Korean nationals into leadership roles at the shrines.

Chōsen Shrine, in Seoul, was built in 1920 and was named an Imperial Shrine in 1925 (a few months ahead of completion). It was the first Korean shrine to be funded by the state, and was established as the first in a series of national shrines to be built in each Korean province. By the 1930s, it was the Korean Governor-General's policy to build a Shinto shrine in every village in Korea, and the total reached 995 by the end of the Japanese occupation in 1945. This was 57 percent of all shrines Japan built outside of Japan during the war. These shrines were more aggressive in their outreach to locals than the expatriate-led shrines had been before.

=== Compulsory attendance ===
In 1925, primary school students and staff were required to attend local shrines as part of an "Imperial subject-making" initiative, kōminka seisaku. In 1936, shrine worship was made compulsory for university students as well. Schools refusing to participate in these trips could be closed. Under the National Mobilization law of 1938, laws requiring Christian schools to visit shrines were expanded to include all Christians. That September, members of a Presbyterian church in Korea were forced to visit a shrine at bayonet point.

== The Shinto shrine issue ==
The question of whether or not it was acceptable for Christians to attend shrine ceremonies was a dilemma that deeply divided the Korean Church particularly during the 1930s, with Presbyterians being more strongly opposed and the Methodists and Roman Catholics more tolerant of the practice. It was however foreign missionaries who had originally been the most outspoken on the issue, but their opposition had meant many were no longer able to stay in Korea, particularly in the north.

On one hand many churches and mission groups believed that it was idolatry, while many other churches came to trust the Japanese when they claimed that the ceremonies weren't religious in nature but rather just ultra-nationalism. The latter believed that fundamental opposition to shrine worship was doing more harm to Christianity in Korea than it was doing good. Thus, in order to appease the Japanese colonialists and keep Christian schools open, many Christians became increasingly tolerant of shrine worship including the Presbyterian General Assembly, once so opposed to the practice.

Post-WWII, even today, the Shrine question remains a sensitive issue among Korean Christians. While many considered it to have been a tactful necessity to keep the Church visible, many others were disappointed by the lack of gospel faithfulness exhibited by Christian leaders in the face of persecution. In the following decades, many pastors (but not all) repented for compromising their faith during Japanese colonialism and were strongly encouraged to be a 'sheep' for a short period as way of restoring the integrity of their faith.

== Integration with Korean tradition ==
Japanese Imperial scholars such as Ryūzō Torii and Ogasawara Shozo advocated the position that Korean and Japanese folk traditions shared a common, shamanic link, which bolstered Imperial Japanese claims about the legitimacy of the Korean occupation. This argument lead them to encourage fusing the worship of the Meiji Emperor with Dankun (だんくん), a legendary founder of Korea. A Korean scholar, Choe Nam-seon, challenged this belief by asserting that Tan'gun was the origination point of Shinto, urging a reconsideration of Shinto as one, localized aspect of a broader shamanistic tradition in Asia. Nam-seon was eventually pressured to promote the idea that Shinto was the key manifestation of this tradition, and that all Asian folk traditions were essentially Shinto in other forms.

Other intellectuals at the time emphasized what came to be called "the Inheritance Myth." This argued that Dankun, the "Kami" of Korea, had passed control of Korean land to the Imperial family, owing to the family's deep ties to the Shinto sun goddess, Amaterasu Omikami. However, the State apparatus declined to fully incorporate Tan'gun into Chosen Shrine, which housed only the kami of Amaterasu Ōmikami and Emperor Meiji.

Ogasawara also proposed a system where Japanese people in the colonies were seen as Amatsukami and natives were seen as Kunitsukami.

== Post-war ==
With Japan's surrender and the invasion of Korea, Shinto shrines became the focus of contempt, such as with papers posted on walls urging citizens to burn them down. As Koreans began pilfering smaller shrines around the country, Shinto priests at Chōsen Shrine withdrew Japanese relics, and soon created a plan to destroy the Korean National Shrine of their own accord. The site has since been replaced with the Ahn Jung-geun Memorial Museum.

=== Sect Shinto in Korea ===
Today there is a presence of Zenrinkyo and Daehan Cheolligyo, the Korean-ized form of Tenrikyo, in South Korea.
