= Chōsen Shrine =

1925–1945 Shinto shrine in Seoul, Korea

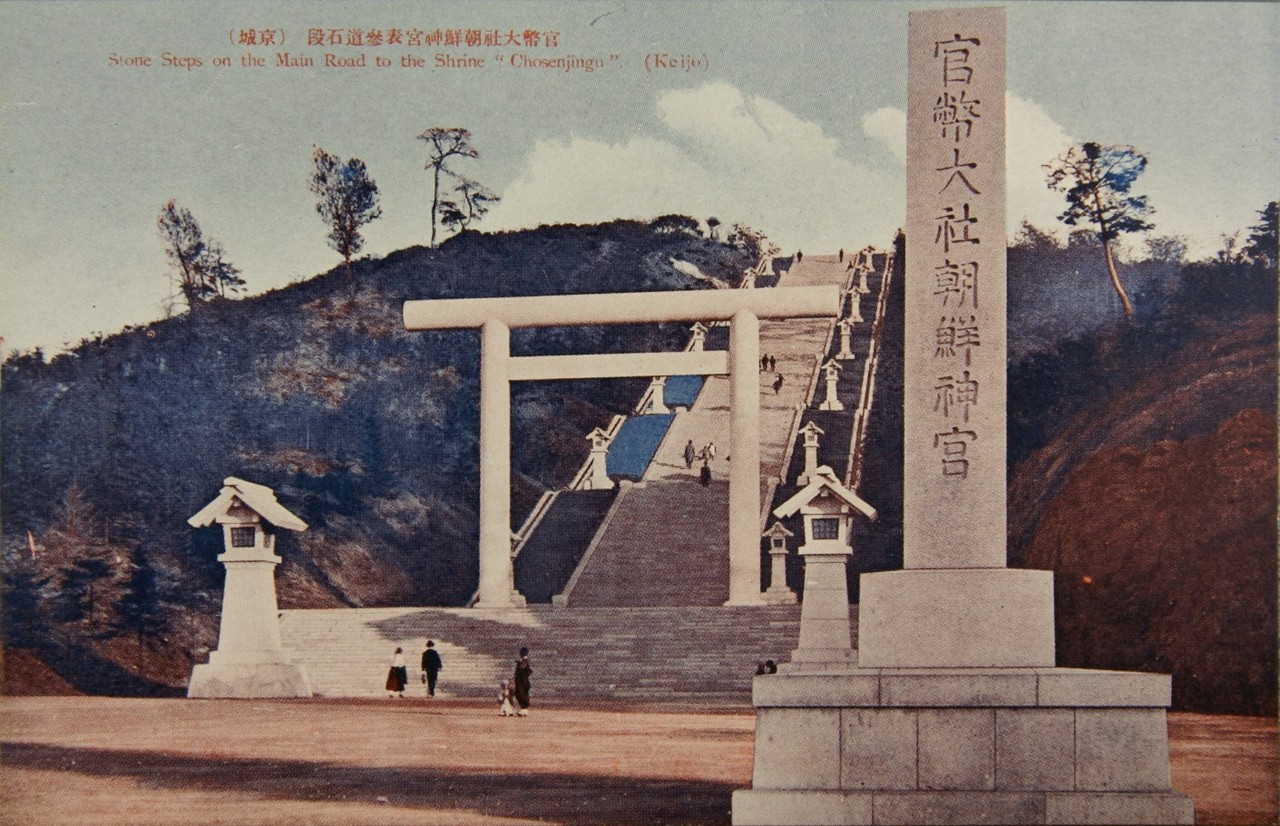
- Entrance stairway to the shrine complex, from a postcard (c. 1930s)

Religion
- Affiliation: Shinto
- Deity: Kunitama Okami; Amaterasu Okami

Location
- Interactive map of Chōsen Shrine
- Coordinates: 37°33′13″N 126°58′58″E

Japanese name
- Kanji: 朝鮮神宮
- Hiragana: ちょうせんじんぐう
- Katakana: チョソンシングン
Transcriptions
- Revised Hepburn: Chōsen Jingū

Korean name
- Hangul: 조선신궁
- Hanja: 朝鮮神宮
- RR: Joseon singung
- MR: Chosŏn sin'gung

Chōsen Shrine (Japanese: 朝鮮神宮, Hepburn: Chōsen Jingū; Korean: 조선신궁; Hanja: 朝鮮神宮) was the most important Shinto shrine during the Japanese colonial period in Korea. It was built in 1925 in Seoul (then called Keijō) and destroyed soon after the end of colonial rule in 1945.

The famous architect and architectural historian Itō Chūta, also responsible for Meiji Jingū, contributed to its planning.

The former site of the shrine is now part of Namsan Park.

== Background ==
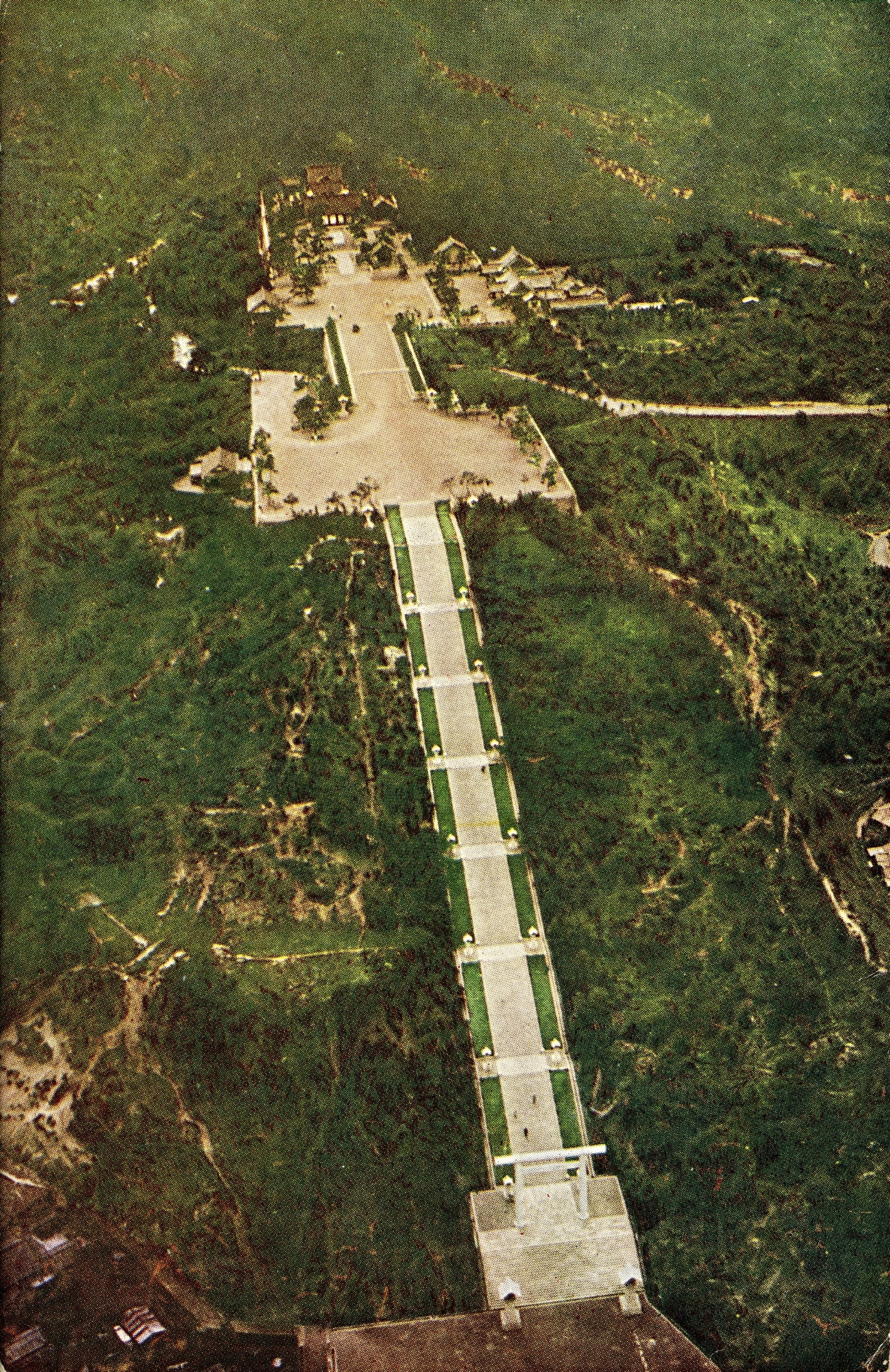
View of the entire shrine complex from the sky c. 1920s

After the annexation of Korea in 1910, the Japanese government embarked upon a policy of Japanization. This included worship at Shintō shrines, as much a political expression of patriotism as a religious act. From 1925, school pupils were required to attend Shinto shrines, and in 1935 it became compulsory for university students and government employees to attend Shinto ceremonies. By 1945, there were a total of 1,140 shrines in Korea associated with State Shinto.

Ogasawara Shozo was an advocate for attempting to use the concept of Okunitama to syncretize Japanese and Korean religion. Some people identified Dangun with Susanoo-no-Mikoto, the government not wanting to take a stand on this enshrined the generic Okunitama at Chōsen Jingu so believers could have their own interpretations. Ogasawara Shozo was a strong advocate of these positions and his advocacy was associated with the enshrinement of Okunitama at both Chōsen Jingu, and Keijō Shrine.

State authorities at Chōsen Jingu however never even allowed for Okunitama to be called "Chosen Okunitama" and indigenous Dangun traditions were suppressed in favor of worshipping Amaterasu in the shrine.

The shrine faced scrutiny in a period prior to its construction. Teisuke Imaizumi, Shozo Ogasawara Ashizu Chihiko, Hida Kageyuki and Momoki Kamo are recorded to have argued that the shrine would be best constructed to enshrine local Korean deities, requesting reconsideration of the policy of enshrinement established for it.

== History ==
The shrine was constructed in 1925, and an enshrinement ceremony held in October. It was dedicated to Amaterasu and Emperor Meiji. It was constructed in the shinmei-zukuri style of Ise Jingū.

Worship at the shrine increased in the 1930s after the government began forcing people to attend. This made the shrine and others a target of resentment; within days of Korea's liberation in 1945, many shrines were burnt down.

An ethnic Korean group proposed to take over Okunitama worship after the war and convert the shrine to one worshipping Dangun but was denied by the new government. Ogasawara also proposed a system where Japanese people in the colonies were seen as Amatsukami and natives were seen as Kunitsukami.

After the announcement of Japan's surrender on August 15, a ceremony was held that afternoon to remove the enshrined deities. The shrine was considered by the United States Army Military Government in Korea to be "enemy property".

Chōsen Jingū was demolished in October 1945. The former site of the shrine is now part of Namsan Park. In 1970 the "Patriot An Jung-geun Memorial Hall" was constructed on the site of the former shrine, in honour of An Jung-geun, the assassin of Itō Hirobumi, the first Japanese Resident-General. A statue of another independence activist, Kim Ku, was also erected on the spot.

== Description ==
The shrine ran along a straight axis of around 500 meters (1,600 ft). The main shrine was at the far end away from the entrance.

== Gallery ==
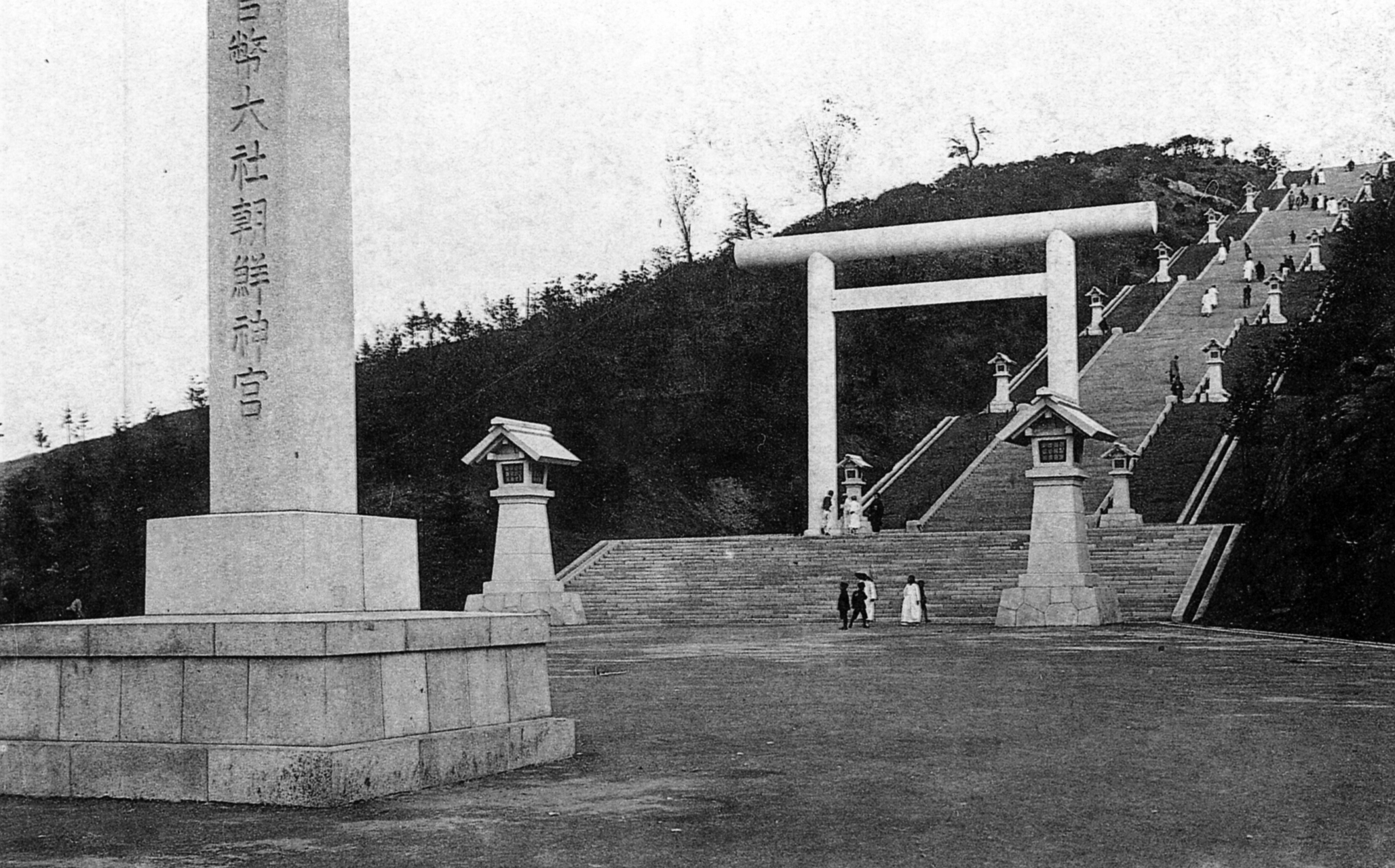
Alternate view of the stairway

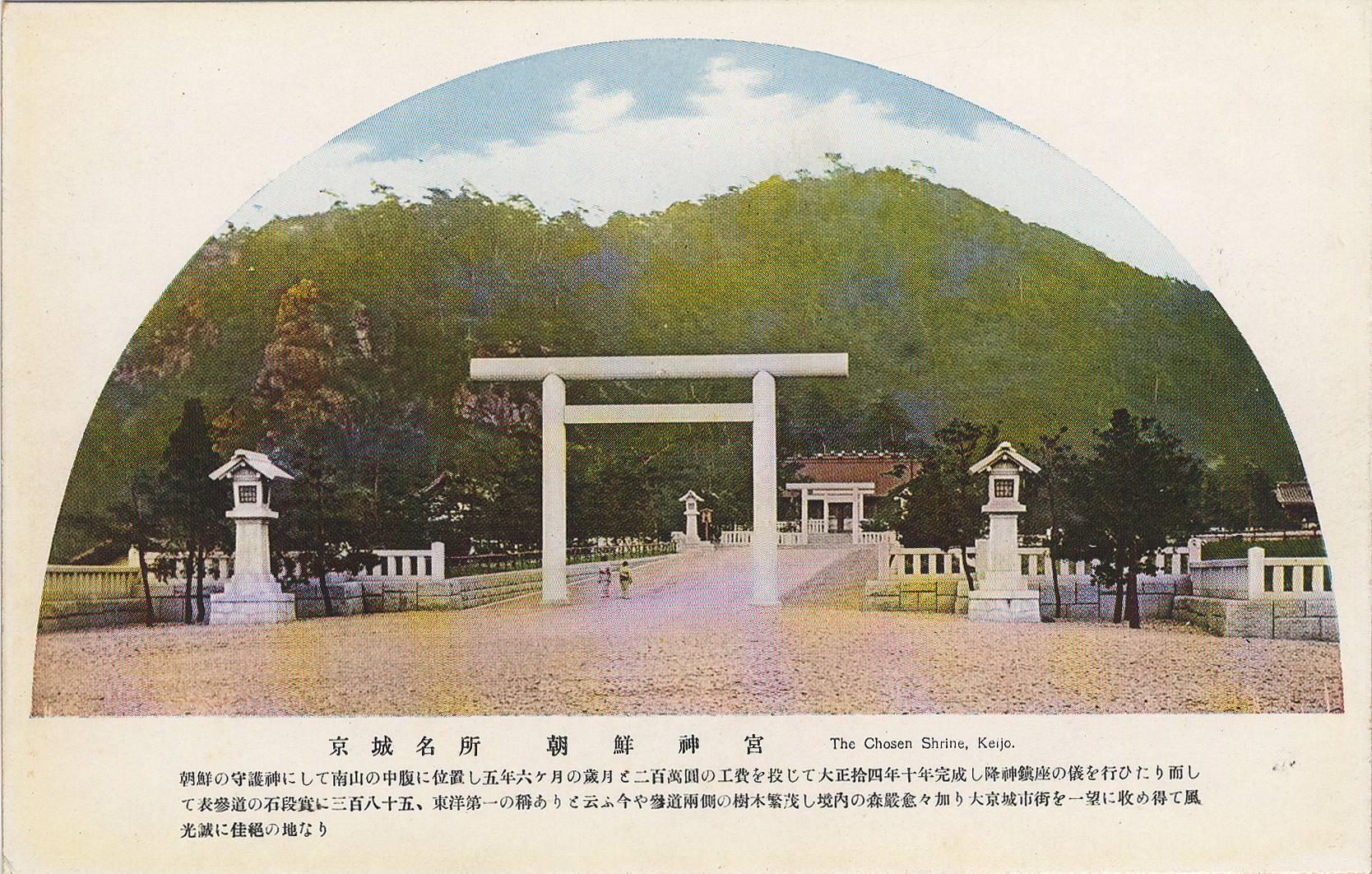
Frontal view of the shrine (contemporary Japanese postcard)

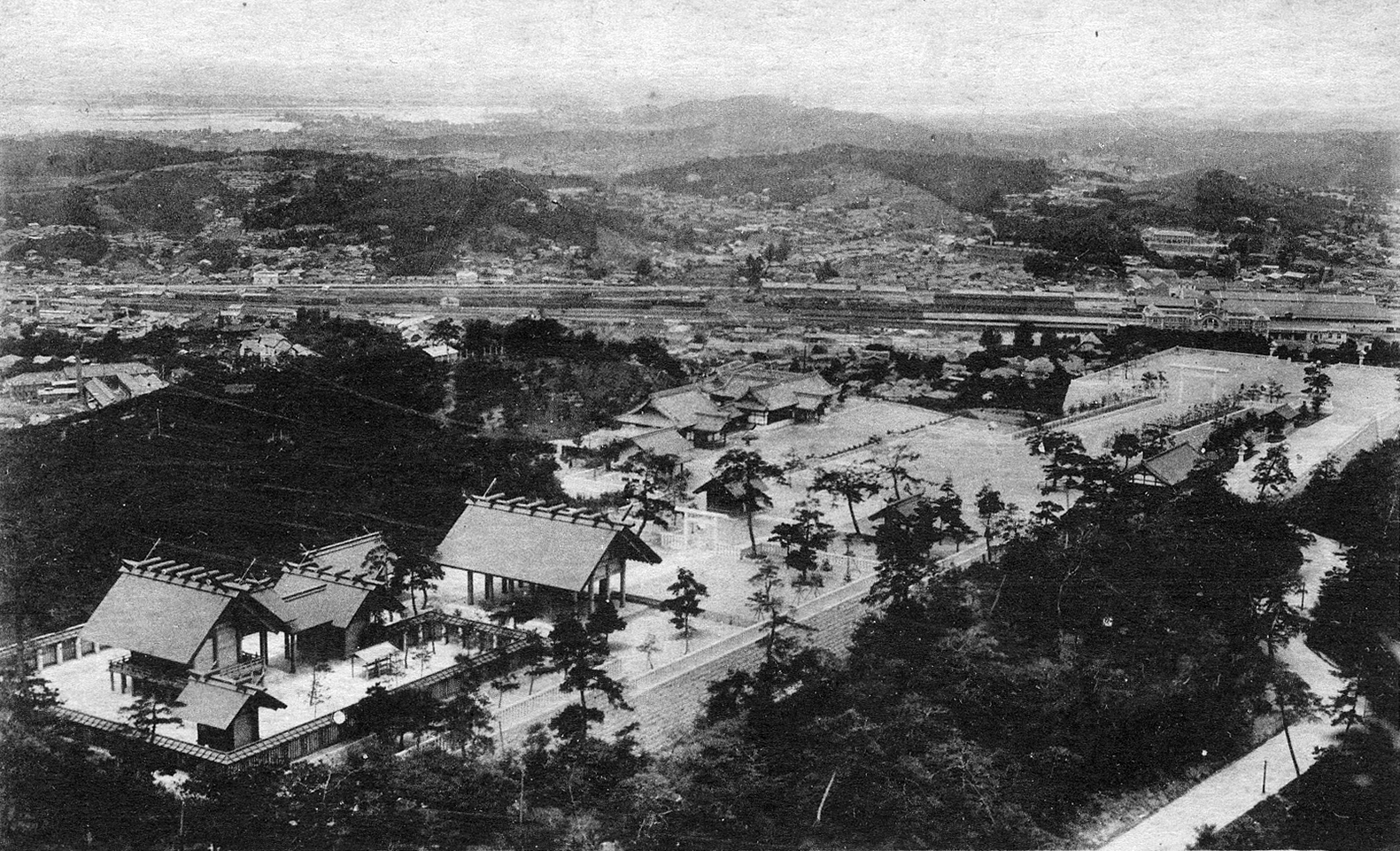
Bird's eye view (contemporary Japanese postcard)

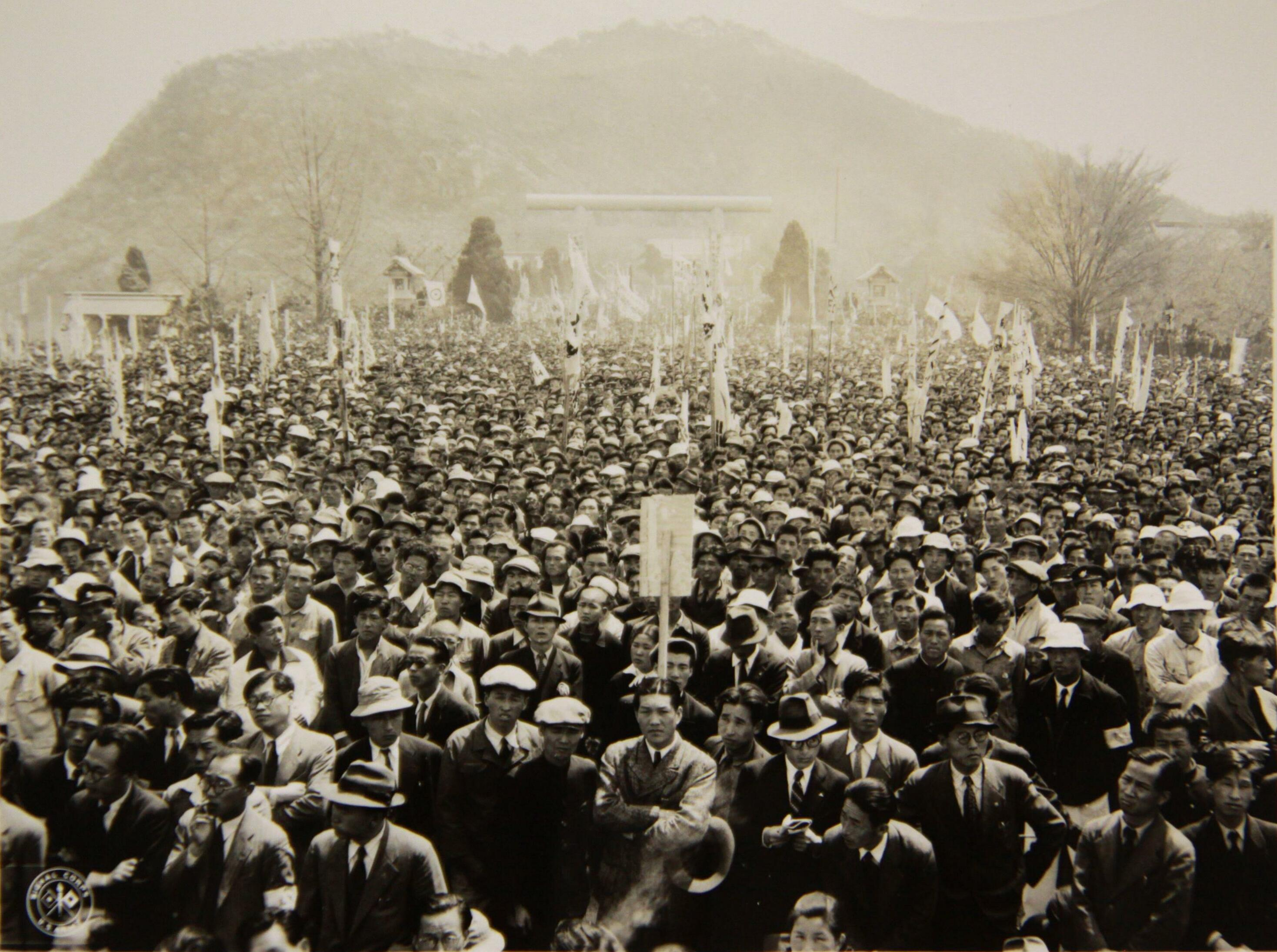
A political rally by a left-leaning group at the former site of the shrine, on 11 May 1947. A gate of the shrine is still standing in the picture.

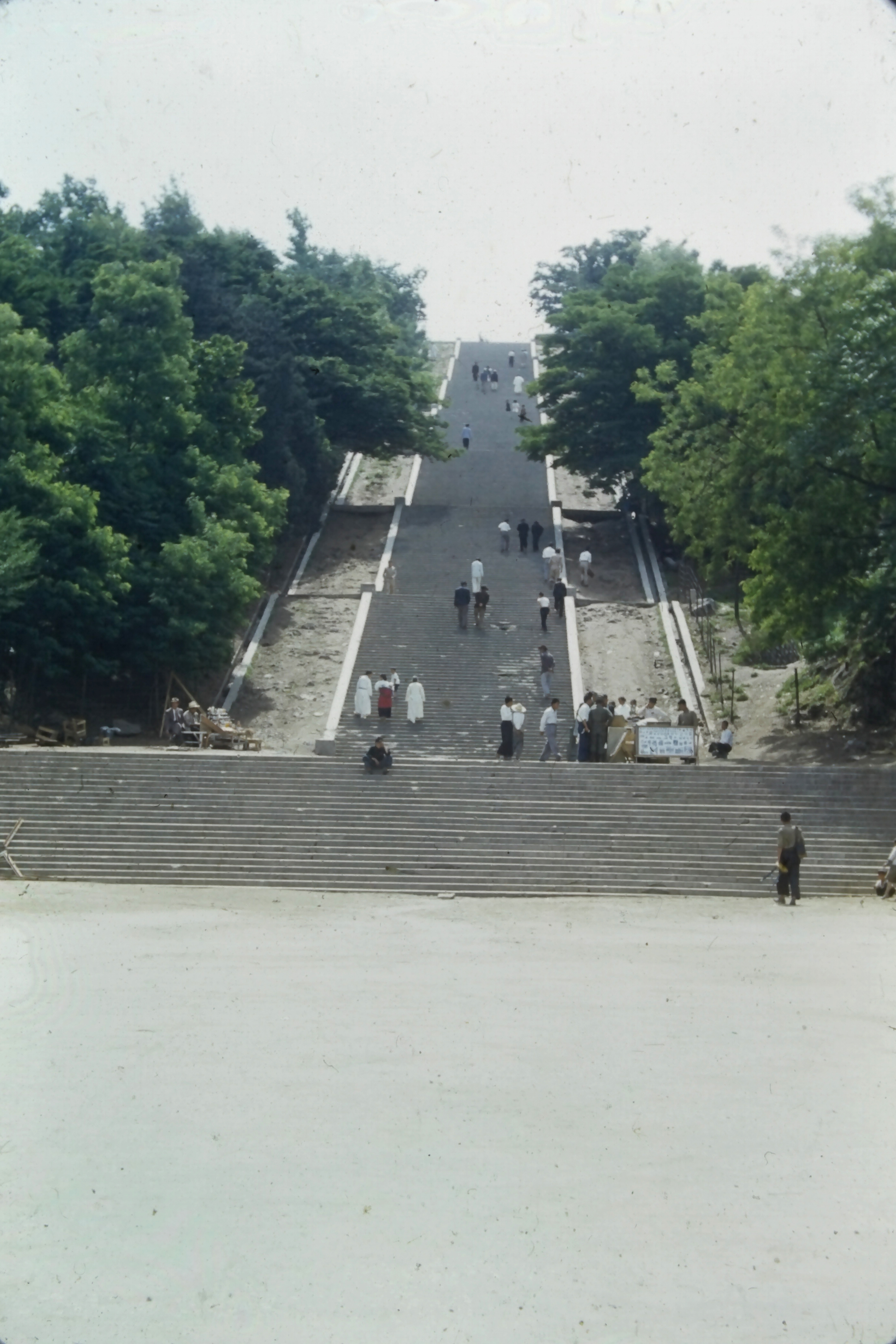
The remaining steps to the shrine in 1955

== See also ==
- State Shinto
- Shinto in Korea
- Korea under Japanese rule
- Modern system of ranked Shinto Shrines
