= Keijō Shrine =

1898–1945 Shinto shrine in Seoul, Korea

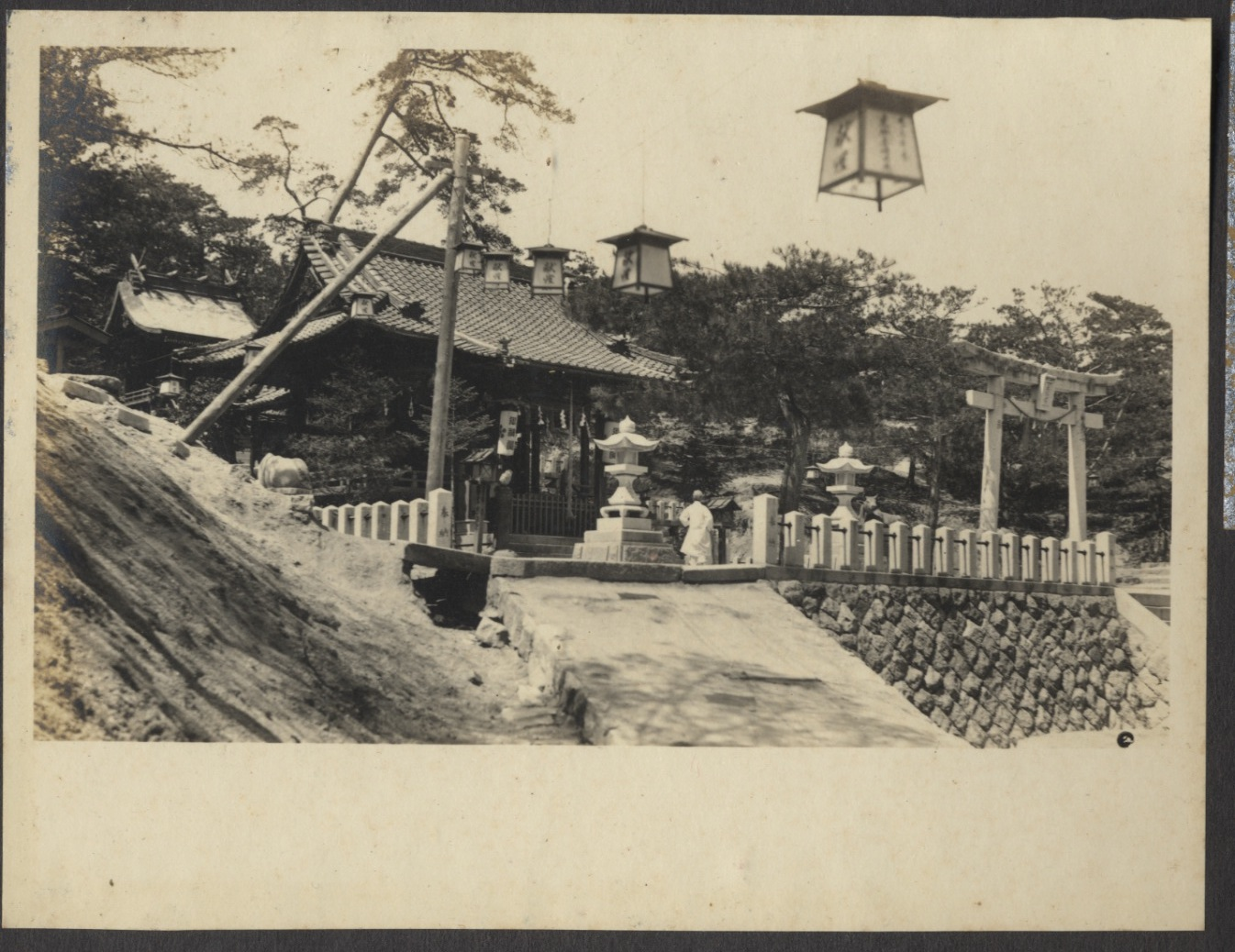
- Part of the shrine complex

Religion
- Affiliation: Shinto
- Deity: Amaterasu, Three Pioneer Kami (開拓三神, Kaitaku Sanjin) Ōkunitama, Ōkuninushi, and Sukunahikona, Dangun?

Location
- Municipality: Keijō
- Country: Korea, Empire of Japan
- Location relative to present-day Seoul
- Coordinates: 37.5569°N 126.9864°E

Architecture
- Established: November 3, 1898
- Destroyed: November 17, 1945

Keijō Shrine (京城神社, Keijō-jinja; Korean: 경성신사), sometimes Seoul Shrine, was a Shinto shrine in Keijō (Seoul), Korea, Empire of Japan. The shrine was established on November 3, 1898, and destroyed on November 17, 1945, several months after the end of colonial rule.

The shrine was located to the north of the mountain Namsan.

== Theological history ==
Initially the shrine only worshipped Amaterasu but it later added the Three Pioneer Kami (開拓三神, Kaitaku Sanjin) Ōkunitama, Ōkuninushi, and Sukunahikona used in Japanese colonial shrines. after it was established that it would not become the Chosen Jingu.

Uniquely it referred to Kunitama as Chosen Kunitama suggesting a distinctly Korean flavor, as this shrine attempted to integrate many Korean customs. Many locals identified "Chosen Kunitama" with Dangun.

In 1936 the government released a memo saying that Okunitama was in fact a generic title for any Korean deity and not Dangun. The name was also changed to Kunitama-no-Okami as a parallel to Amaterasu Omikami

== Gallery ==
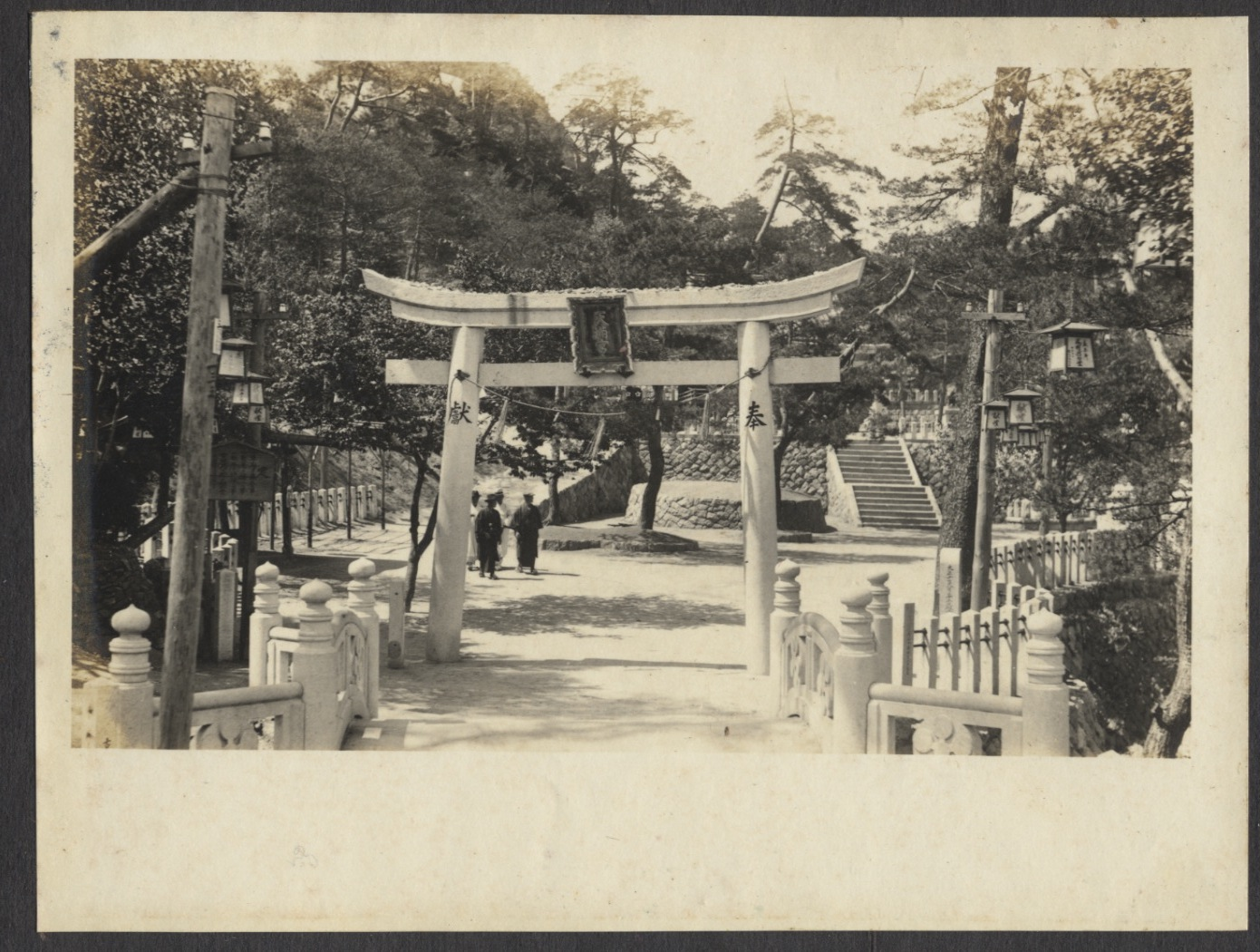
Torii

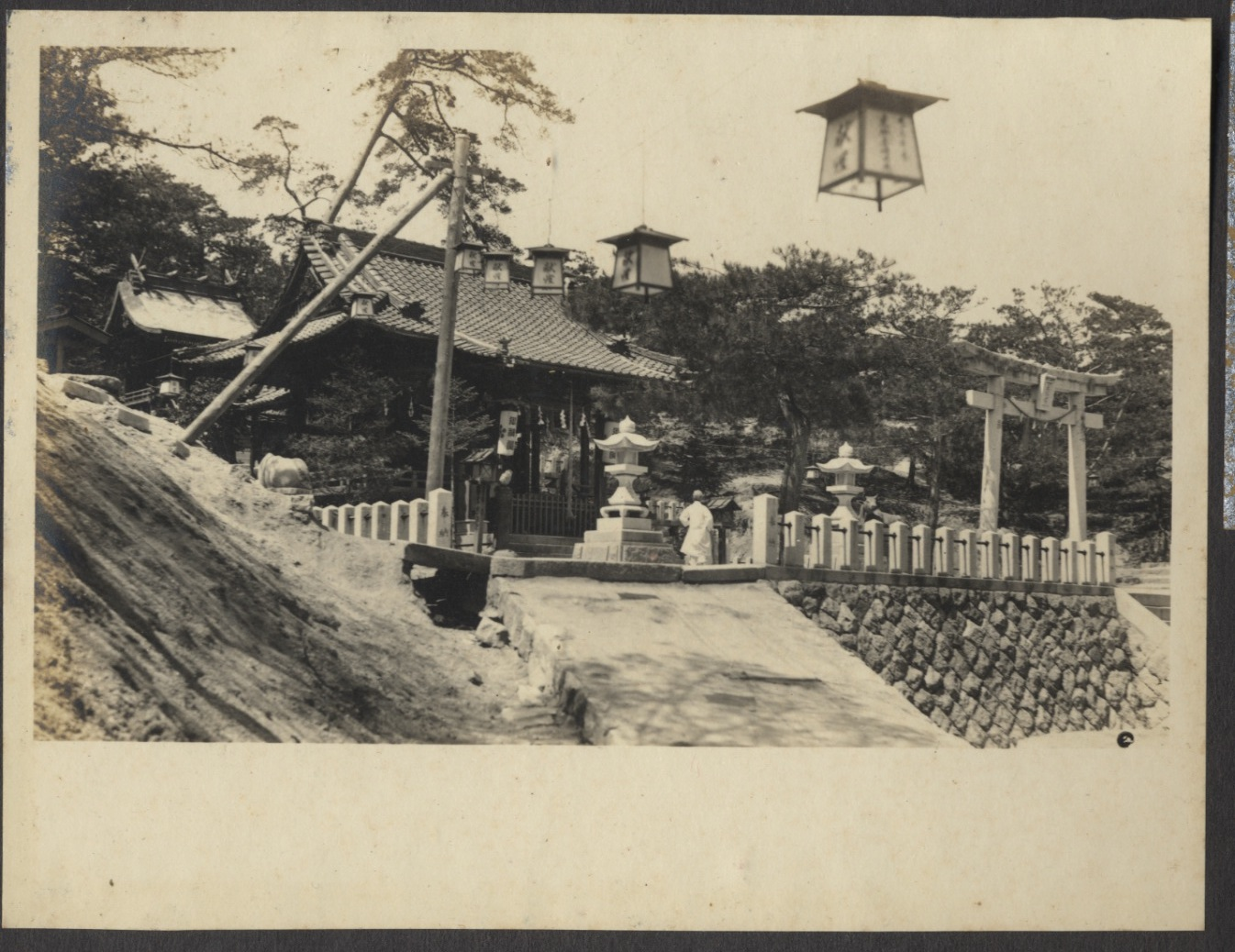
Honden

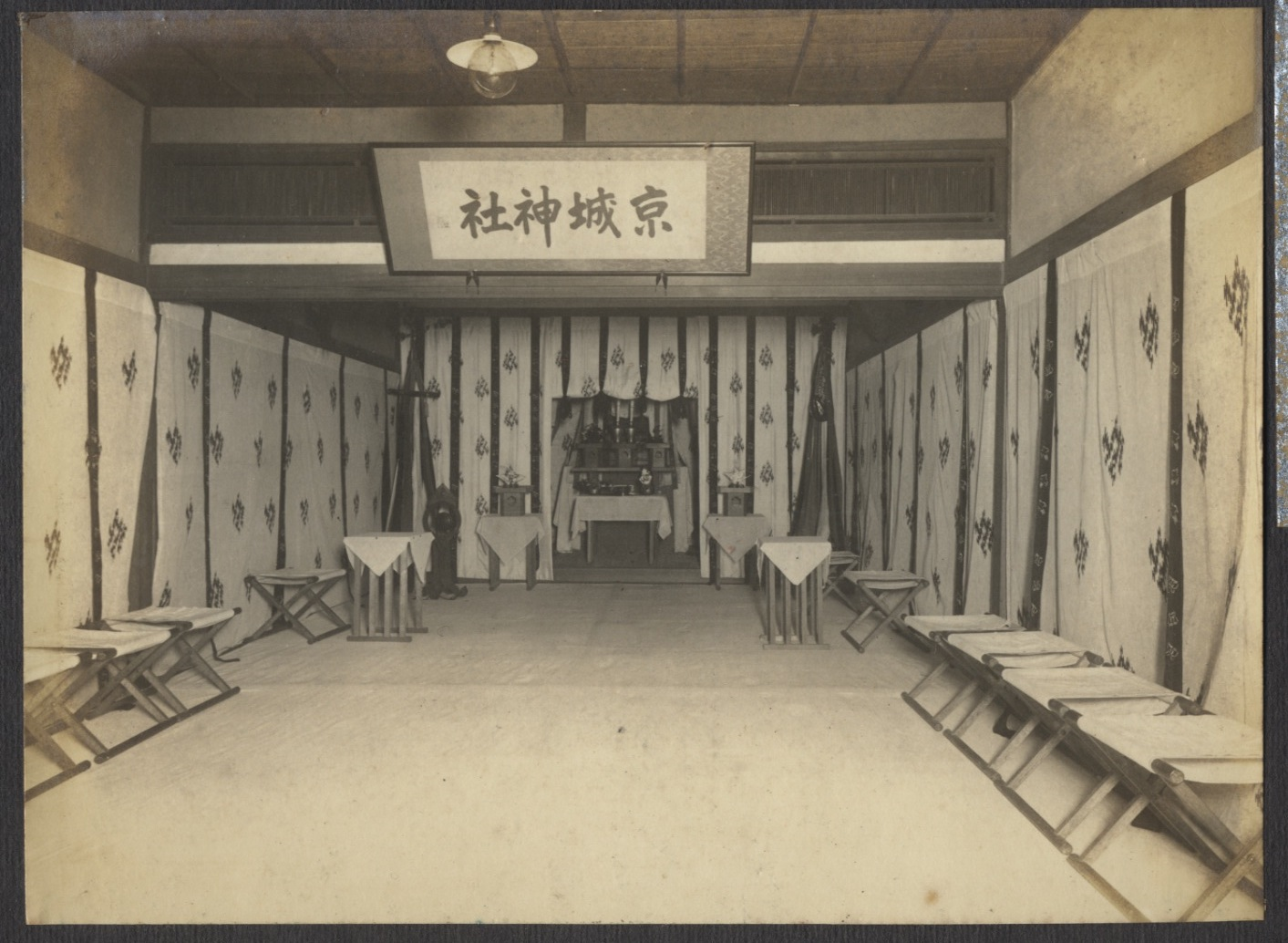
Interior

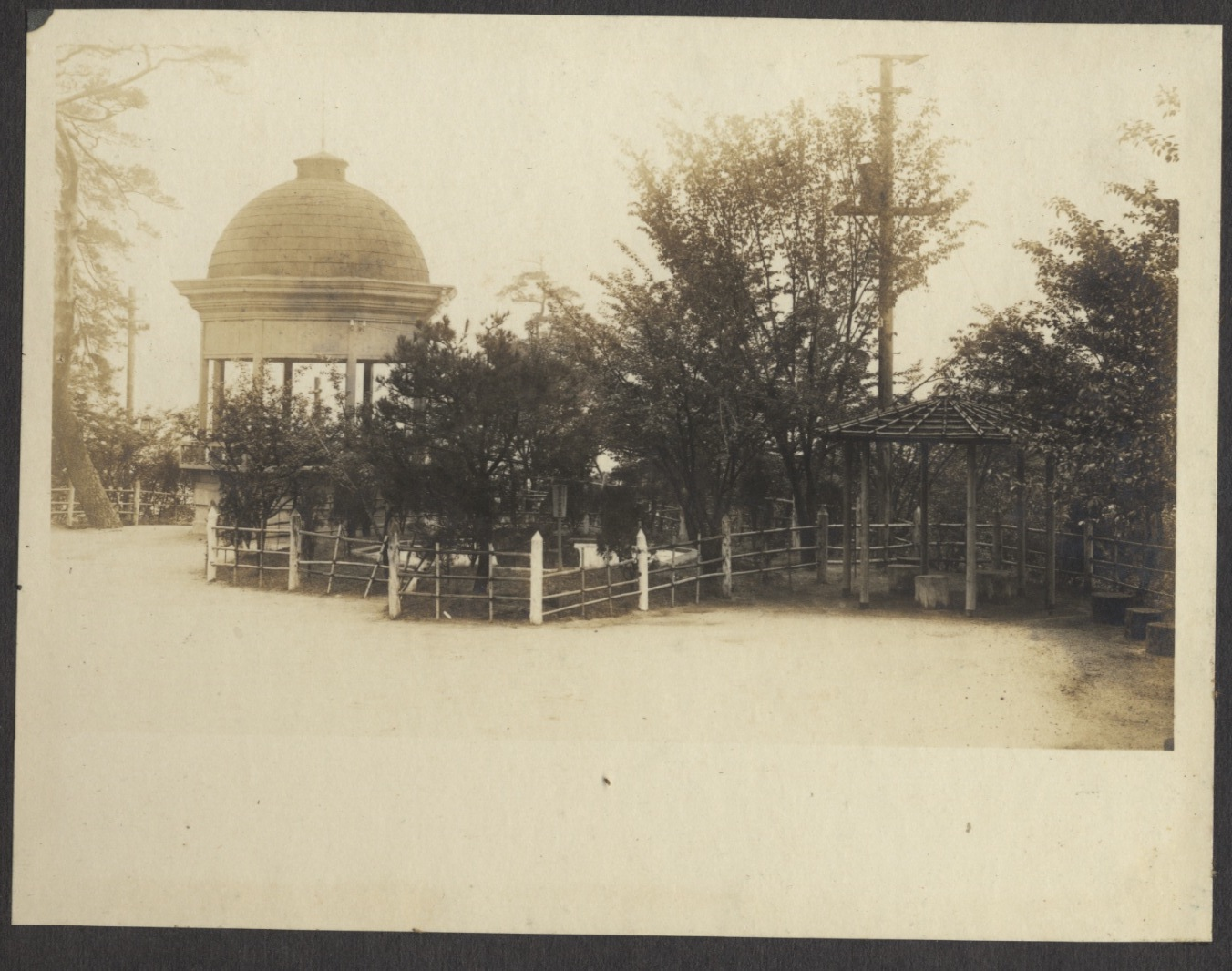
Pavilion

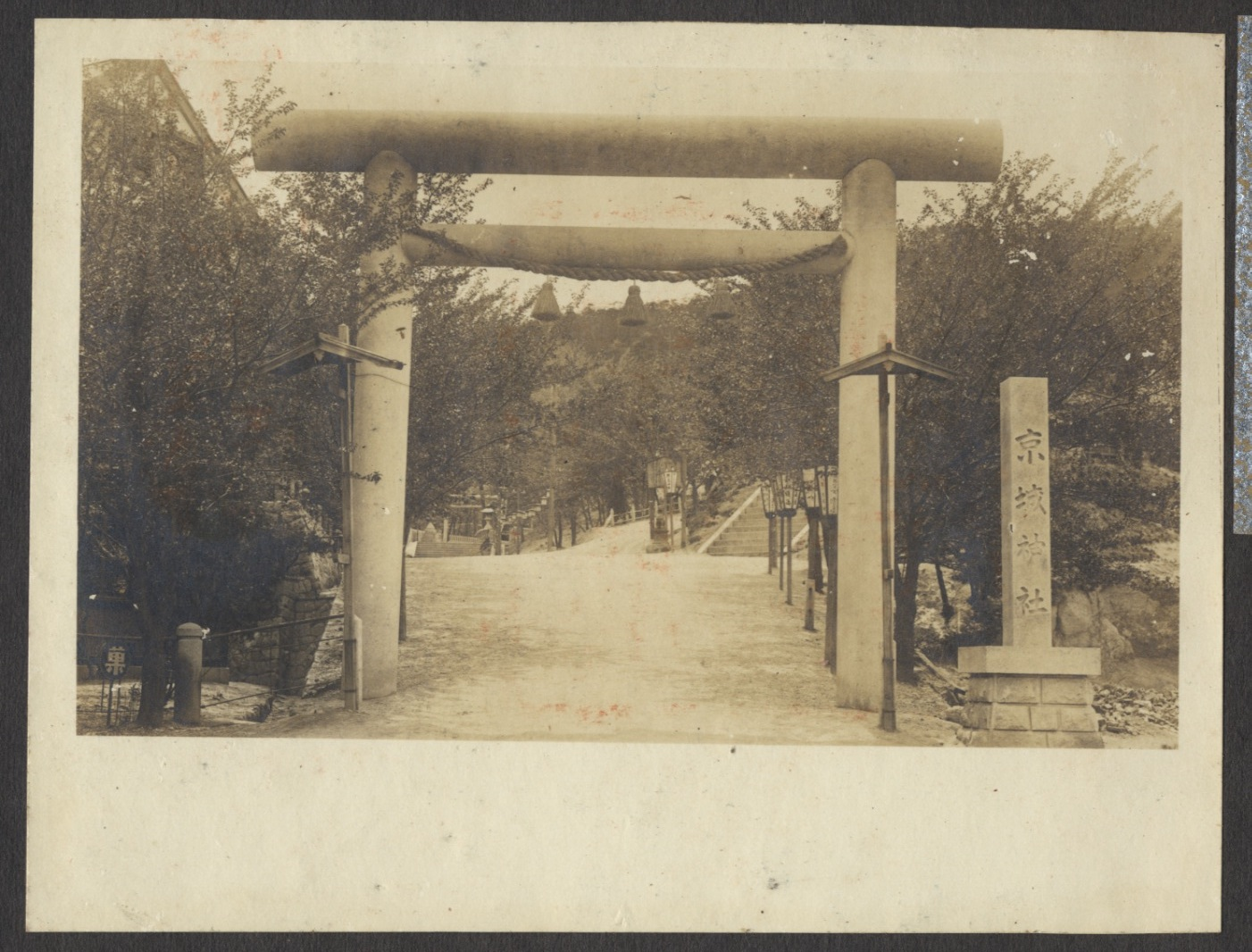
Torii

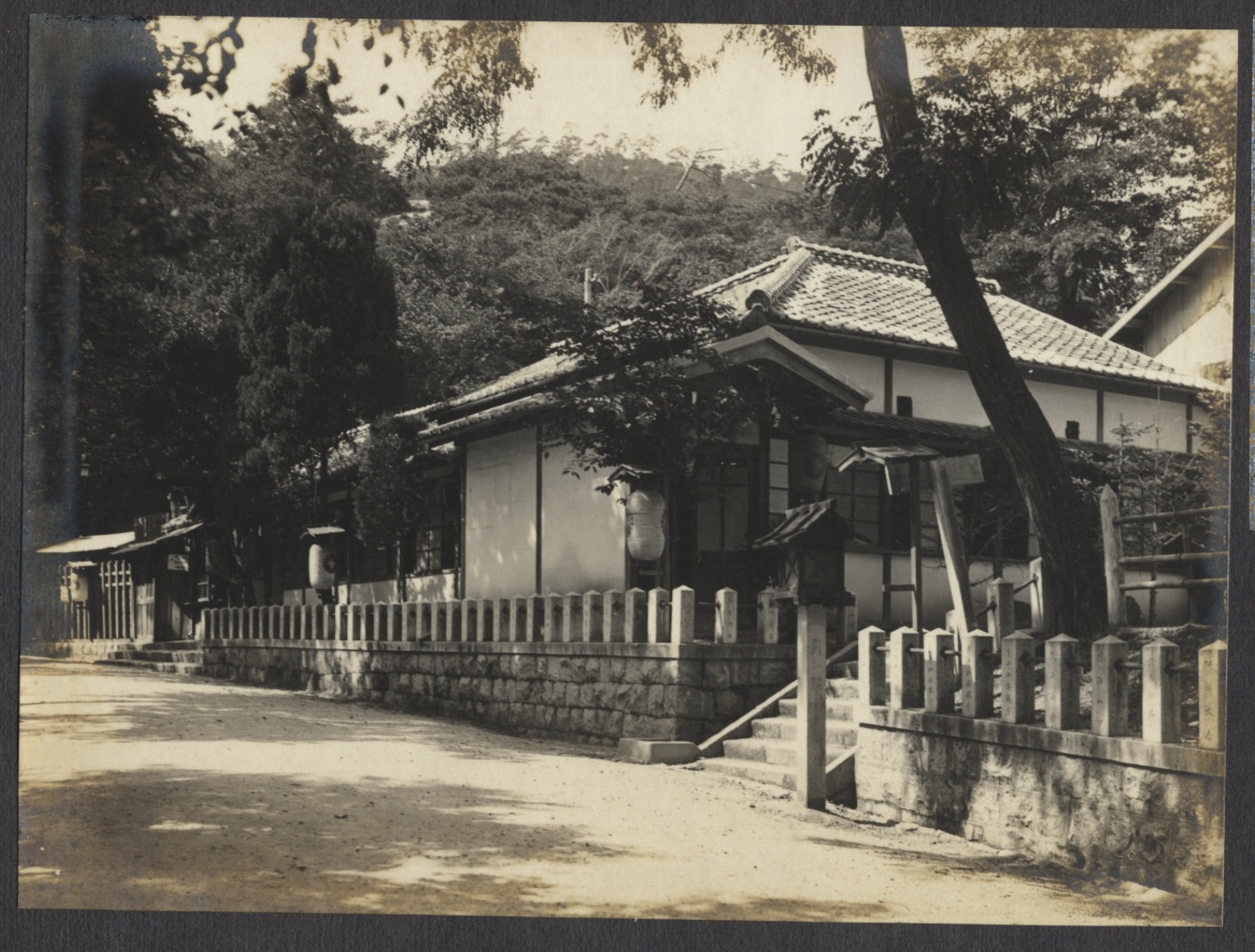

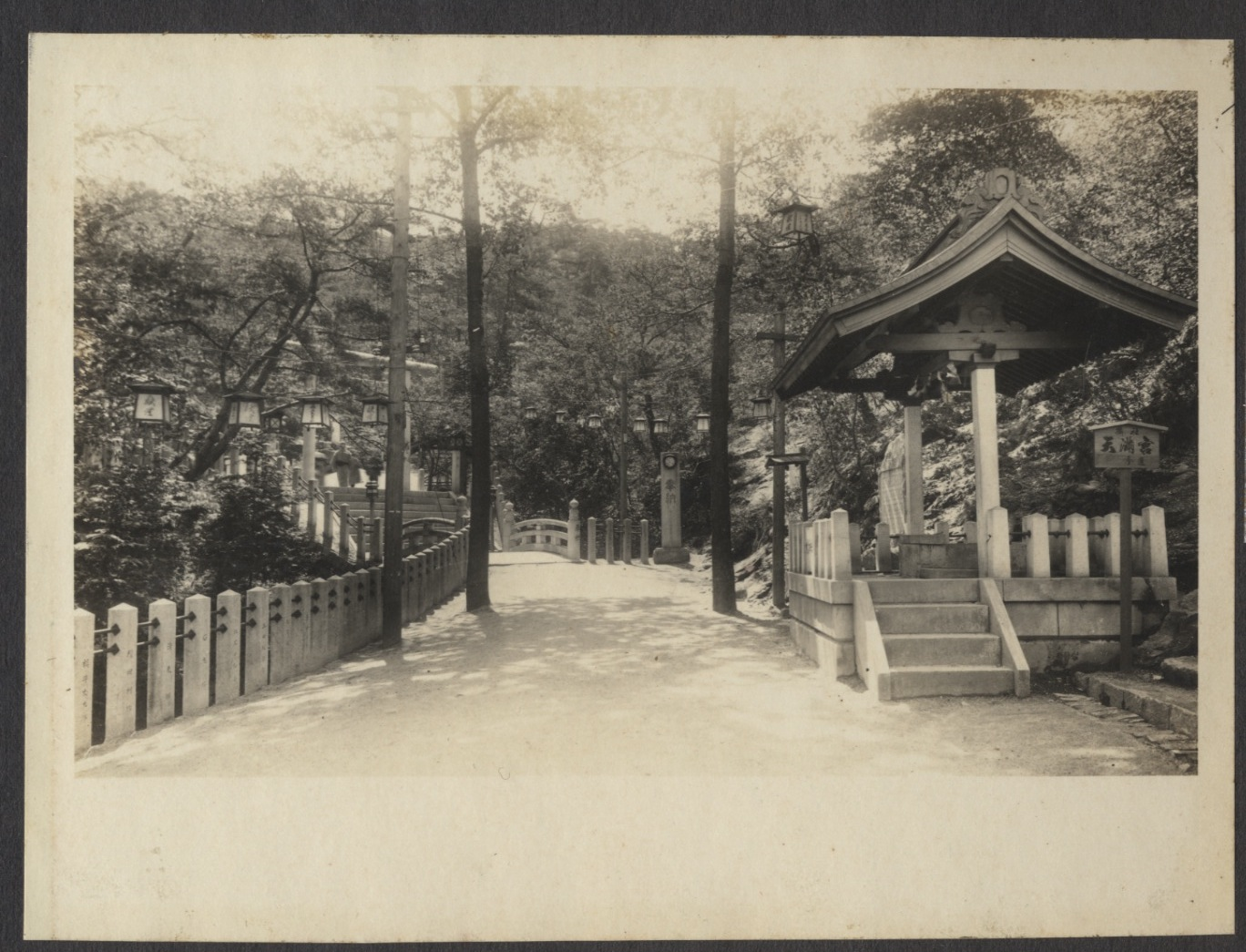

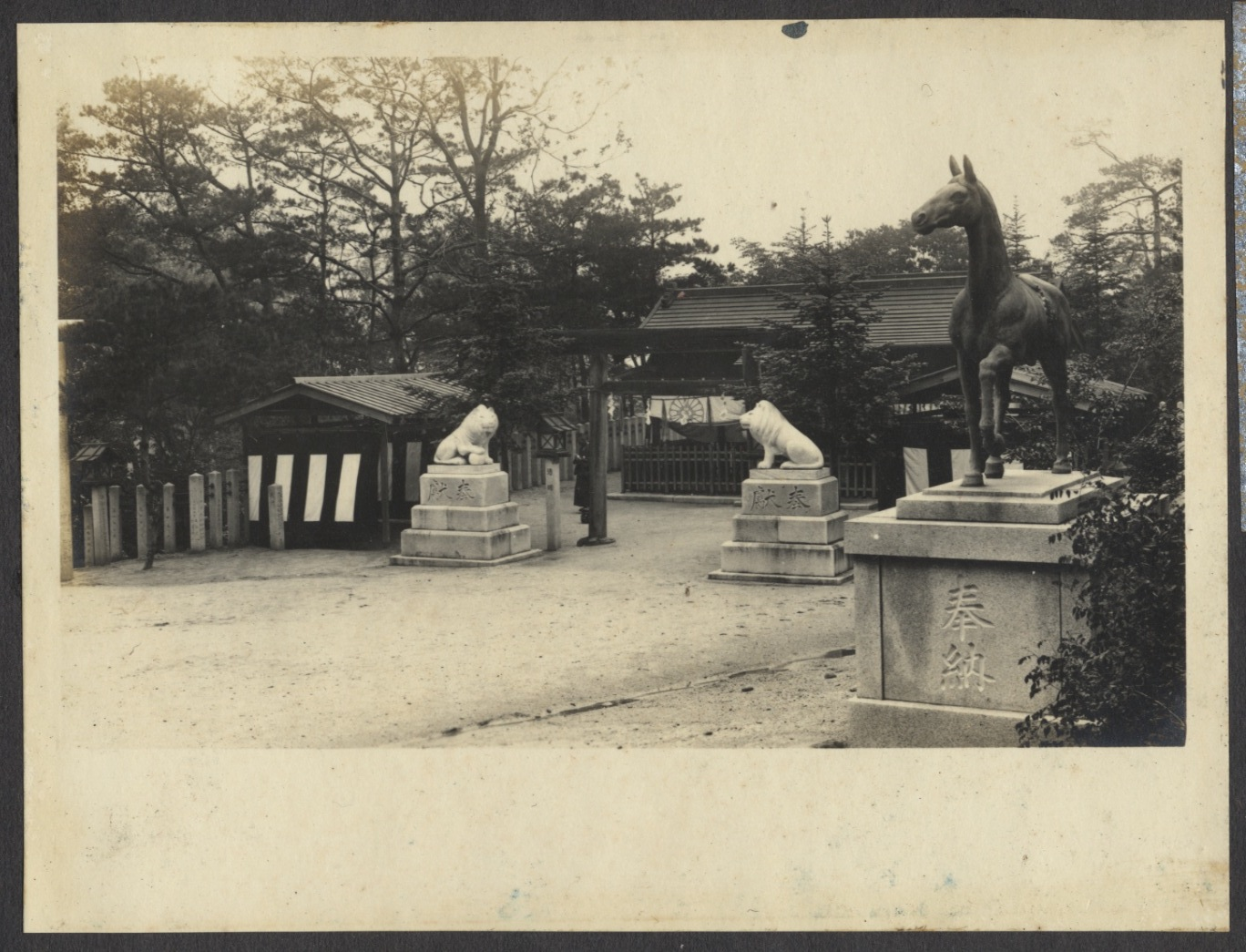
Entrance statues

== Auxiliary shrines ==
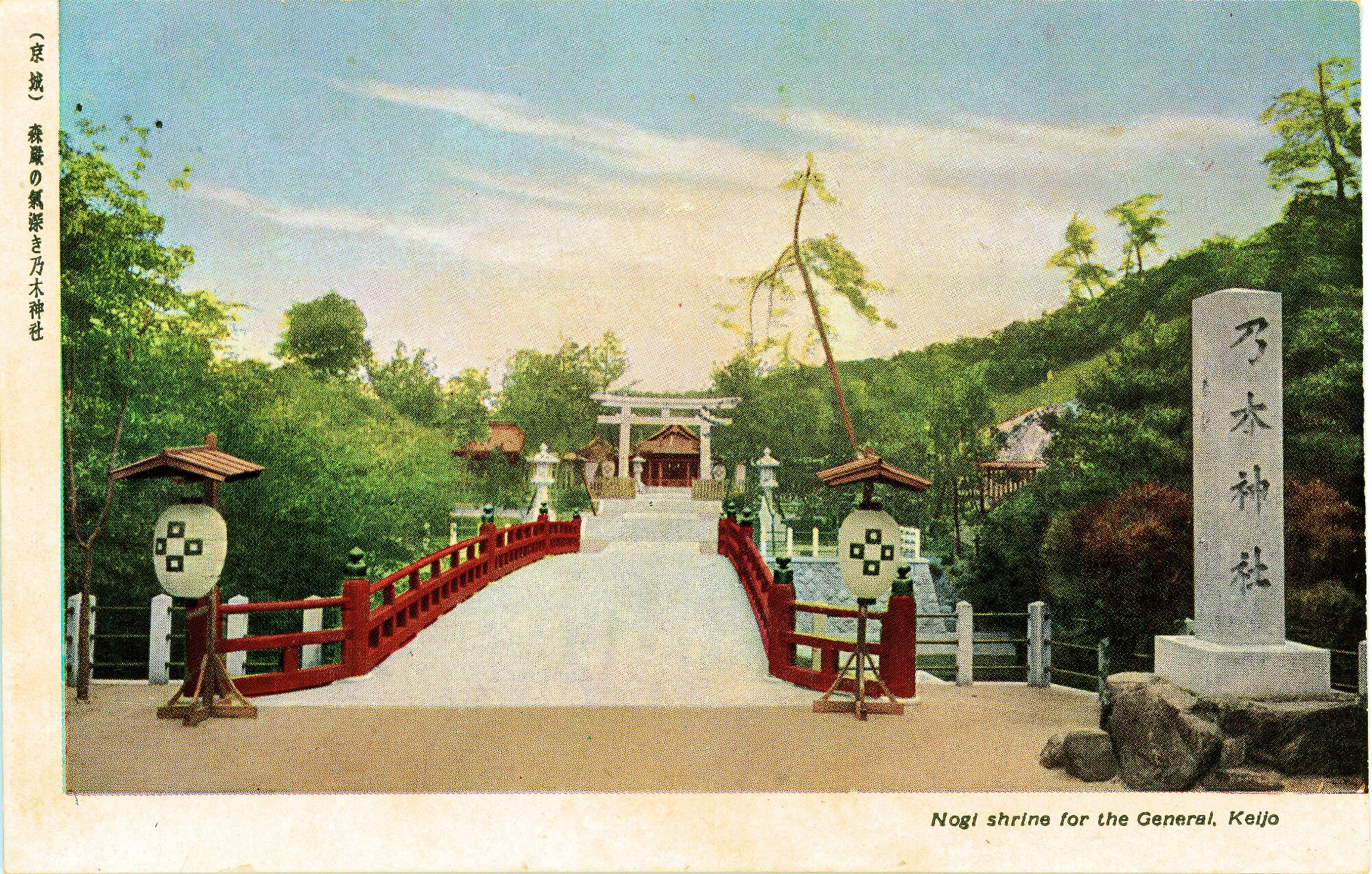
Nogi Shrine (乃木神社, Nogi jinja) in the shrine complex, dedicated to Japanese General Nogi Maresuke.
