= List of Korean films of 1919–1948 =

This is a chronological list of films produced in Korea while it was part of Japan (ie until August 15, 1945) as well as the united country of Korea before it officially became divided in September 1948 (ie from August 15, 1945 until September 9, 1948).

The lists of Korean films are divided by period for political reasons. For later films of divided Korea (September 1948 to present) see the List of South Korean films and List of North Korean films.

For an A-Z list of Korean-language films, see List of Korean-language films.

The first domestic Korean film was shown in 1919.

== 1910s ==
All films are silent film.

English Title	Korean Title	Director	Cast	Genre	Notes
1919
A Detective's Great Pain	형사의 고심	Kim Do-san		Action	
Great Scenic Spots of Mt. Geumgang	금강산대활동			Documentary	
Righteous Revenge	의리적 구토	Kim Do-san		Action	
The Real Scenes of the National Funeral of Gojong	고종인산실경			Documentary	
The Suburban Sceneries of Kyongsung	경성교외전경			Documentary	
This Friendship	시우정	Kim Do-san		Documentary	

== 1920s ==
All films are silent film.

Scene from the 1926 film Nongjungjo.

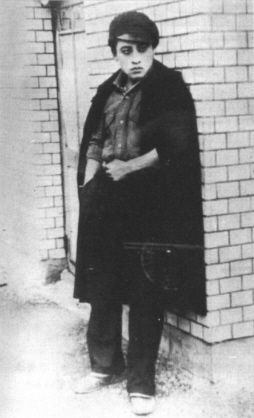
Scene from the 1926 film Punguna (Soldier of Fortune).

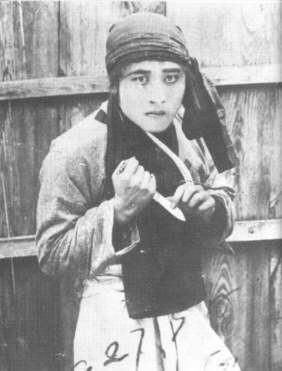
Scene from the 1927 film Deuljwi (The Field Mouse).

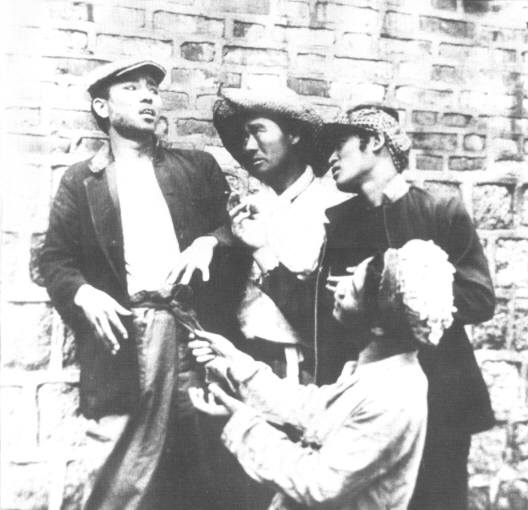
Scene from the 1927 film Jalitgeola (Farewell).

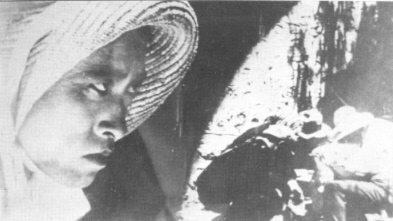
Scene from the 1927 film Geumbungeo (The Golden Fish).

Scene from the 1928 film Sarangeul chajaseo (In Search of Love).

English Title	Korean Title	Director	Cast	Genre	Notes
1920
A Truly Good Friend	지기	Lee Ki-se		Melodrama	
Eternal Love of Su-il and Sun-ae	장한몽	Lee Ki-se		Melodrama	
The Chivalrous Robber	의적	Kim Do-san		Action	
The Cholera	호열자			Educational	
The Fidelity to A Student's Principle	학생절의	Im Seong-gu		Crime	
The State of Affairs in Joseon	조선사정			Propaganda	
1923
Hongyeopmun	홍엽문	An Gwang-ik			
The Border	국경	Kim Do-san		Melodrama	
The Story of Chun-hyang	춘향전	Koshu Hayakawa (Japan)		Melodrama	
The Vow Made below the Moon	월하의 맹서	Yun Baek-nam		Drama	
1924
Janghwa Hongryeon jeon	장화홍련전	Kim Yeong-hwan		Drama	
The Sorrowful Song	비련의 곡	Koshu Hayakawa (Japan)		Melorama	
The Sorrowful Song of the Sea	해의 비곡	Kanjo Takasa (Japan)		Melorama	
1925
A Hero in a Small Village	촌의 영웅	Yun Baek-nam		Drama	
Amgwang	암광	Kanjo Takasa (Japan)		Historical	
Nolbu and Heungbu	놀부흥부	Kim Choon-gwang		Drama	
The Great Flood of Han River	한강대홍수(을축년수해)	Lee Phil-woo		Documentary	
The Pioneer	개척자	Lee Gyeong-son		Educational	
The Story of Sim-cheong	심청전	Lee Gyeong-son		Drama	
The Story of Woon-yeong	운영전	Yun Baek-nam		Melodrama	
The Twin Jade Pavilion	쌍옥루	Lee Gu-yeong		Drama	
1926
Arirang	아리랑	Na Woon-gyu		Drama	
Eternal Love of Su-il and Sun-ae	장한몽	Lee Gyeong-son		Melodrama	
Fool	멍텅구리	Lee Phil-woo		Comedy	
Nongjungjo	농중조	Lee Gyu-seol		Melodrama	
Soldier of Fortune	풍운아	Na Woon-gyu		Melodrama	
The Captain of Bandits	산채왕	Lee Gyeong-son		Melodrama	
The Royal Crown of a Phoenix	봉황의 면류관	Lee Gyeong-son		Melodrama	
1927
Black and white	흑과 백	Kim Taek-yun		Melodrama	
Destiny	운명	Jeon Hae-un		Drama	
Deuljwi	들쥐	Na Woon-gyu		Melodrama	
Fallen Blossoms On A Stream	낙화유수	Lee Gu-yeong		Melodrama	
Farewell	잘 있거라	Na Woon-gyu		Drama	
Ppulppajin Hwangso	뿔빠진 황소	Namgung Un		Melodrama	
Road to the Twilight Light	낙양의 길	Cheon Han-su		Melodrama	
Seekers of Paradise	낙원을 찾는 무리들	Hwang Un		Drama	
The Golden Fish	금붕어	Na Woon-gyu		Drama	
The Natural Shape of a Mystery Man	괴인의 정체	Kim Su-ro		Mystery	
The Red Lotus Flower and Blighted Love	홍련비련	Lee Phil-woo		Drama	
The Unforgettable Song	불망곡	Lee Gyu-seol		Drama	
When the Sun Rises	먼동이 틀 때	Shim Hoon		Melodrama	
1928
Chunhui	춘희	Lee Gyeong-son		Melodrama	
Hyeolma	혈마	Hong Gae-myeong		Drama	
Looking for Love	사랑을 찾아서	Na Woon-gyu		Drama	
My Dear Friend	나의 친구여	Yu Jang-an		Drama	
Ok-nyeo	옥녀	Na Woon-gyu		Melodrama	
Pure Heart is the Same as God	순정은 신과 같다	Lee Gyu-seol		Melodrama	
Sanai	사나이	Hong Gae-myeong		Action	
The Secret of Jina Street	지나가의 비밀, 일명 흑진주	Yu Jang-an		Melodrama	
The Story of Lady Suk-yeong	숙영낭자전	Lee Gyeong-son		Historical	
Three Beggars	삼걸인	Kim Yeong-hwan		Horror	
Vagabond	유랑	Kim Yu-yeong		Drama	
1929
Deaf Sam-ryong	벙어리 삼룡	Na Woon-gyu		Drama	
A House	혼가	Kim Yu-yeong		Drama	
The Engagement	약혼	Kim Yeong-hwan		Drama	
The Dark Road	암로	Gang Ho		Historical	
The Ringing of A Bell	종소리	Kim Sang-jin		Melodrama	

== 1930s ==
Films between 1931 and October 1935 are silent film.

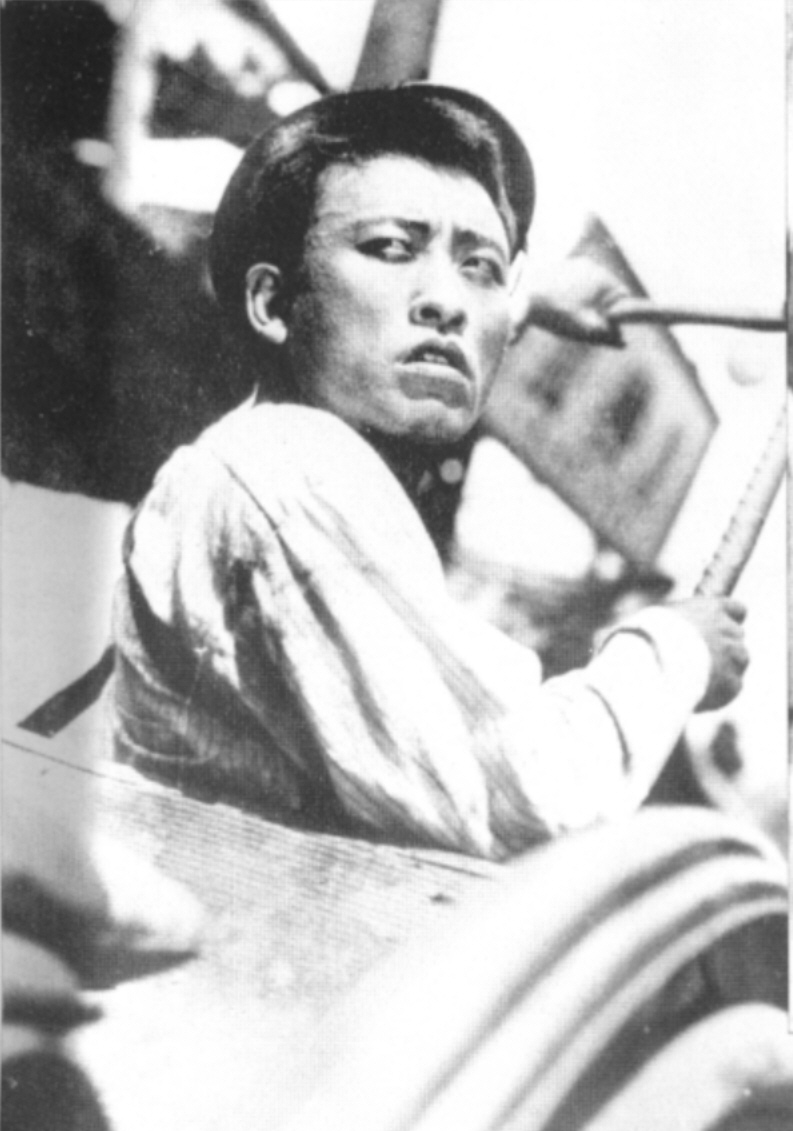
Scene from the 1930 film Cheolindo.

Scene from the 1931 film Geumganghan.

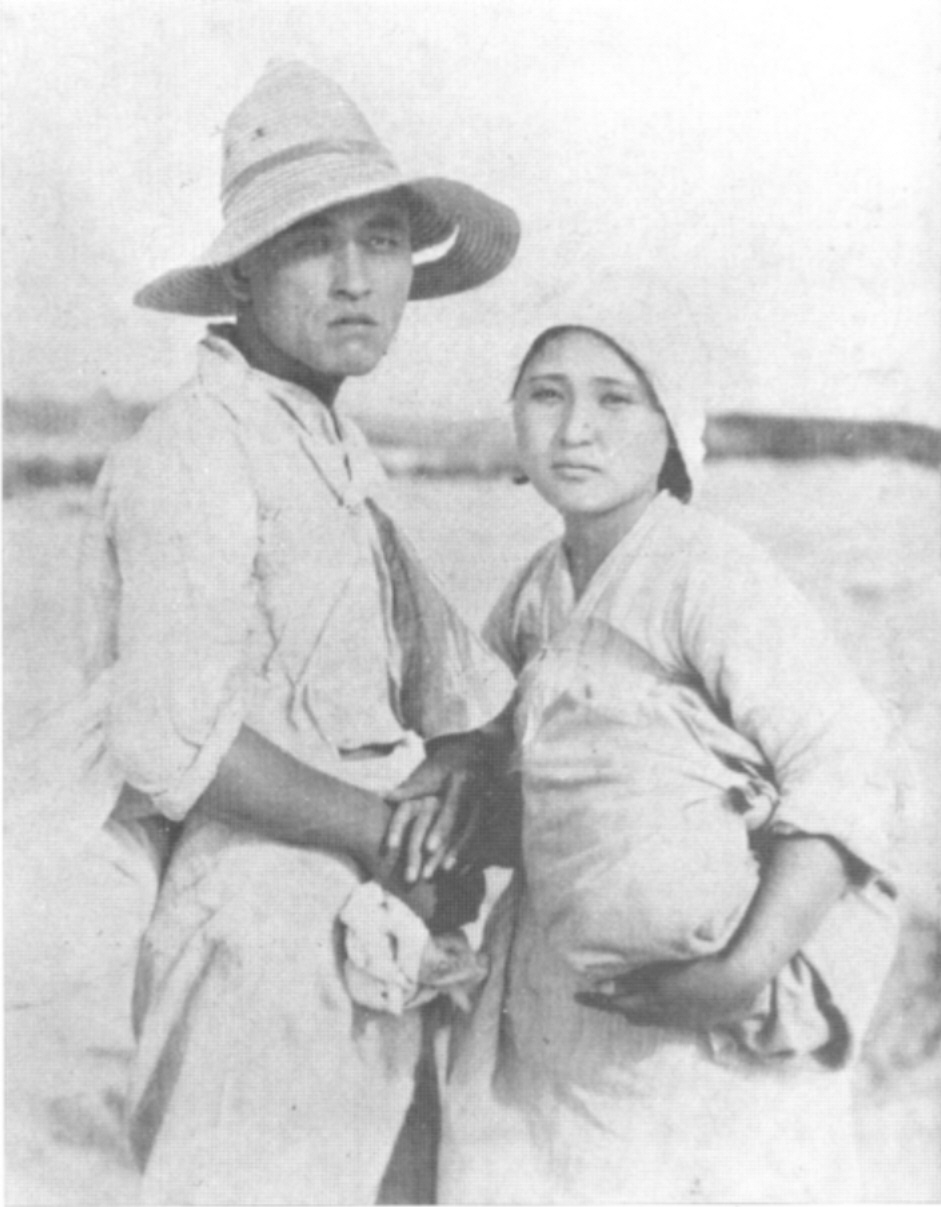
Scene from the 1932 film Imjaeobtneun naleutbae (A Ferry Boat that Has No Owner).

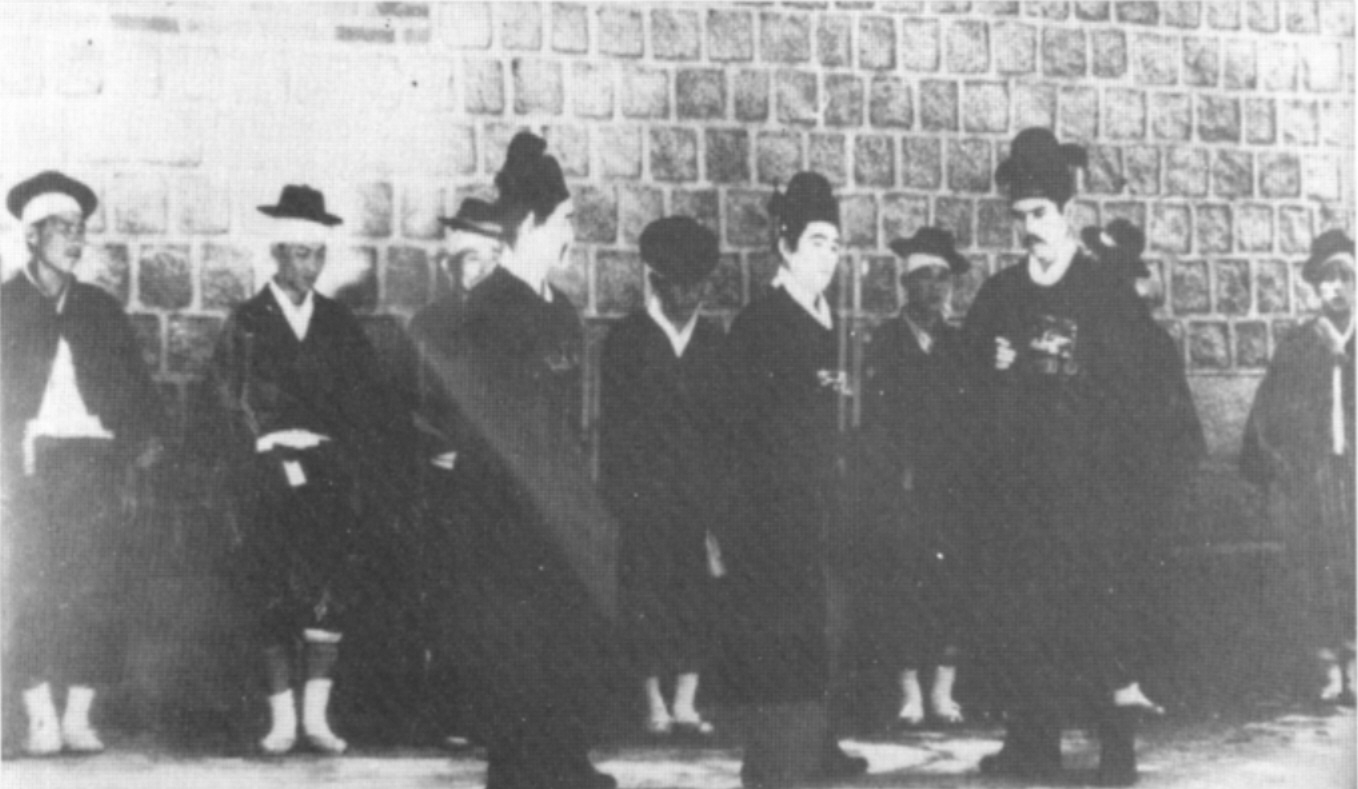
Scene from the 1932 film Gaehwadang imun.

Scene from the 1933 film Jongno.

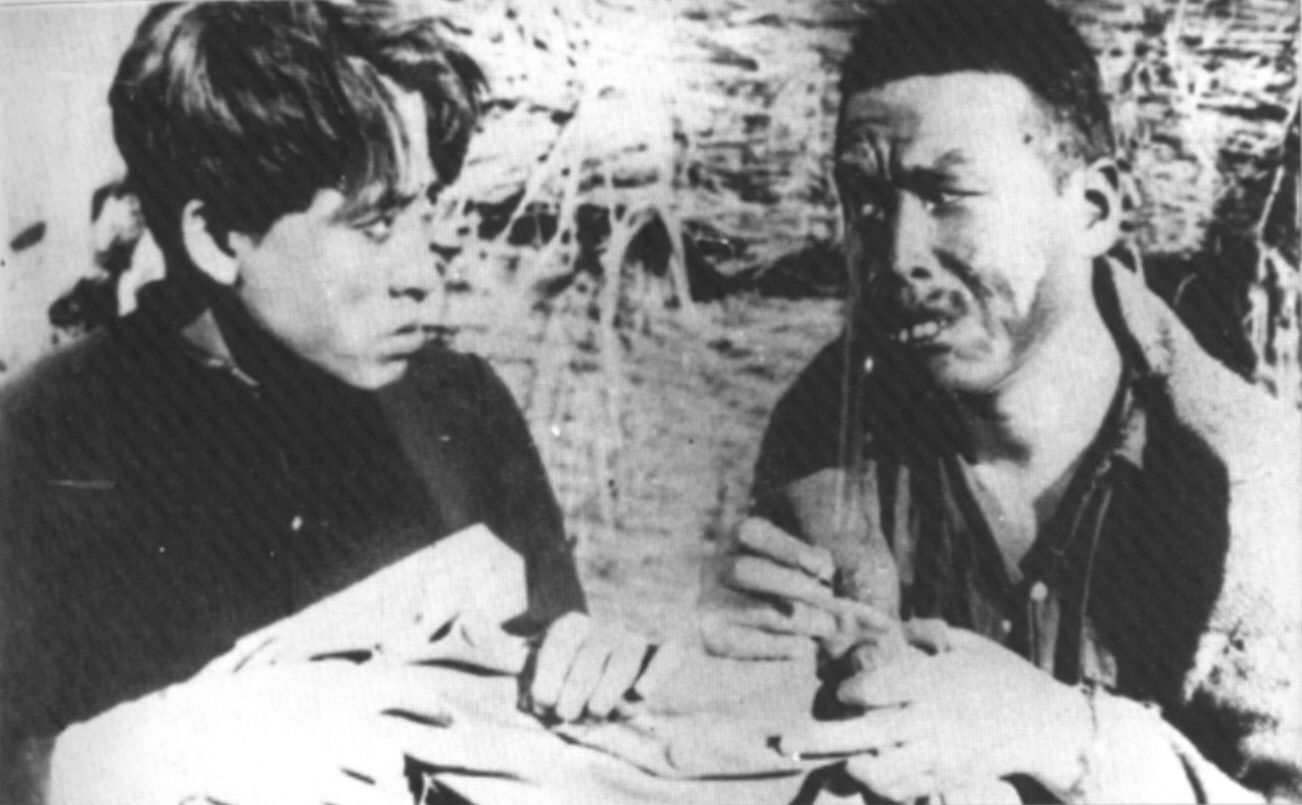
Scene from the 1934 film Chilbeontong sosageon (Incident of the 7th Bamboo Flute).

Scene from the 1935 film Muhwagwa (Fig Tree).

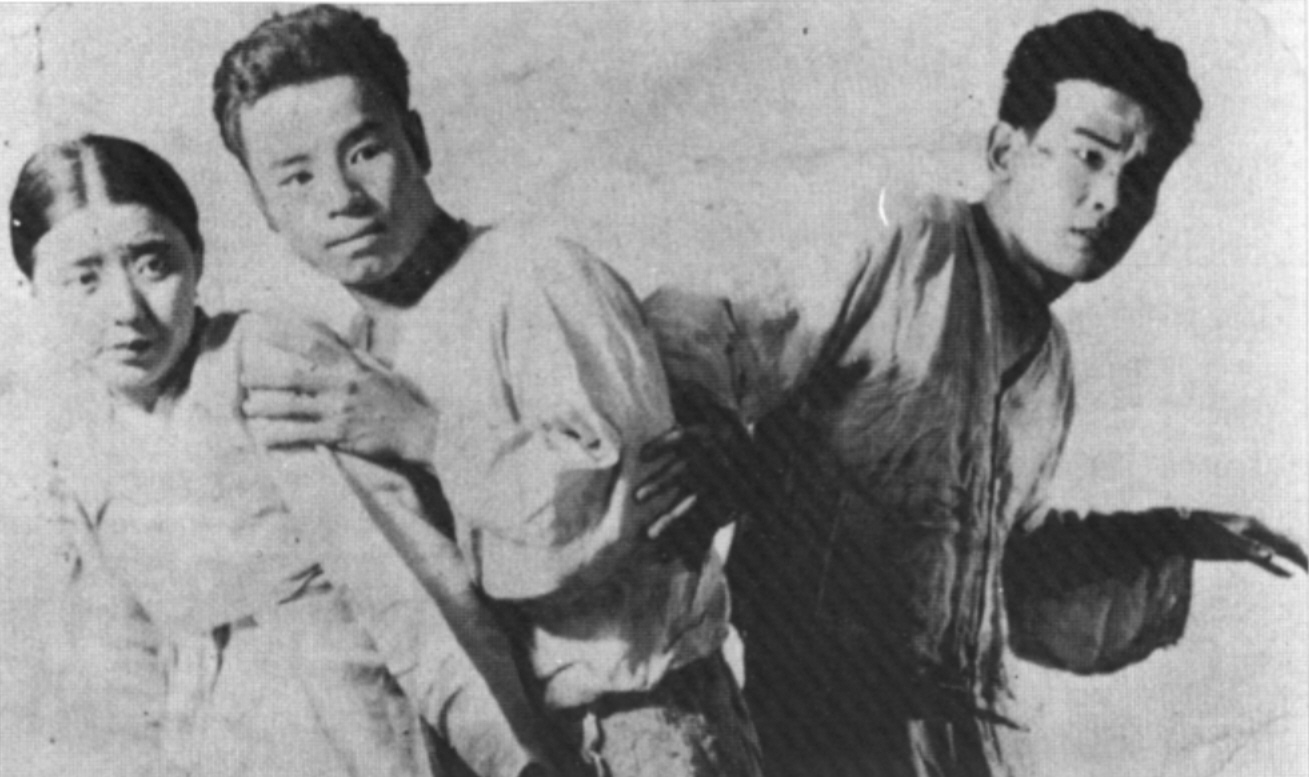
Scene from the 1935 film Kanggeonneo maeul (The Town Across the River).

Scene from the 1937 film Oh Mong-nyeo.

English Title	Korean Title	Director	Cast	Genre	Notes
1930
A Florist	꽃장사	Ahn Jong-hwa		Drama	
A Story of the Day after Arirang	아리랑 그후 이야기	Lee Gu-yeong		Drama	
Be a winner, Sun-i	지지마라 순이야	Namgung Un		Drama	
Cheolindo	철인도	Na Woon-gyu		Drama, Action	
People Who Are Fighting against the Sea	바다와 싸우는 사람들	Yang Cheol		Drama	
Season for Singing	노래하는 시절	Ahn Jong-hwa		Melodrama	
Sorrowful Song in the Buddhist Monastery	승방비곡	Lee Gu-yeong		Melodrama	
The Consolatory Song	회심곡	Wang Deok-seong		Melodrama	
The Justice Wins	정의는 이긴다	Yun Baek-nam			
The Robber	도적놈	Yun Bong-chun		Drama, Family	
The Song of a Young Man	젊은이의 노래	Kim Yeong-hwan		Drama, Family	
The Story of the Royal Inspector, Park Mun-su	어사 박문수전	Lee Geum-ryong		Historical drama	
Underground Village	지하촌	Gang Ho		Drama	
1931
A Rhapsody of Love	연애광상곡	Kim Yeong-hwan		Biographical drama	
Folk Song of the Mill	방아타령	Kim Sang-jin		Drama	
Geumganghan	금강한	Na Woon-gyu		Drama, Action	
Guilty Woman	죄지은 여자	Lee Chang-chun		Drama	
Hwaryun	화륜	Kim Yu-yeong		Historical Drama	
Husband Goes to the Border Garrison	남편은 경비대로	Do Jeon-jang		Drama, Action	
Mountain Monster	산괴령	Lee Chang-chun		Horror	
Reed Flower	갈대꽃	Lee Gu-yeong			
Su-il and Sun-ae	수일과 순애	Lee Gu-yeong		Melodrama	
The Big Grave	큰 무덤	Yun Bong-chun		Drama, Action	
1932
A Ferry Boat that Has No Owner	임자없는 나룻배	Lee Gyu-hwan		Drama	
Gaehwadang imun	개화당이문	Na Woon-gyu		Historical	
The Count of Monte Cristo	암굴왕	Na Woon-gyu		Screen-and-Stage Play	
The Pitiful People	딱한 사람들	Hwang Un		Documentary	
1933
Beautiful Devotion	아름다운 희생	Kim Gwang-ju		Drama	
Getting Better Life	밝아가는 인생	Lee Gyu-hwan		Enlightenment	
Jongno	종로	Yang Cheol		Drama	
1934
Ex-Convict	전과자	Tokihiko Yamasaki (Japan)		Drama, Action	
Lamentation	탄식의 소조	Kim Yeong-hwan		Drama	
Returning Spirit	돌아오는 영혼	Lee Chang-chun		Drama	
The Elegy of the City	도회의 비가	Lee Chang-chun		Drama, Action	
Turning Point of the Youngsters	청춘의 십자로	Ahn Jong-hwa		Drama	The movie was the oldest existing korean film from 2007 to 2019.
1935
Arirang Pass	아리랑고개	Hong Gae-myeong		Melodrama	
Challenge	대도전	Tokihiko Yamasaki (Japan)		Historical, Action	
Muhwagwa	무화과	Na Woon-gyu		Drama	
Passion in the Universe	은하에 흐르는 정열	Ahn Jong-hwa		Drama	
Sea, Talk to Me	바다여 말하라	Lee Gyu-hwan		Drama	
Shadow	그림자	Na Woon-gyu		Drama	
Spring Wind	춘풍	Park Gi-chae		Melodrama	
The Sprinkler	살수차	Baek Un-haeng		Drama	
The Story of Chun-hyang	춘향전	Lee Myeong-u		Melodrama, Historical	
The Story of Hong Gildong	홍길동전	Tokihiko Yamasaki (Japan)		Historical	
The Town Across the River	강건너 마을	Na Woon-gyu		Drama	
1936
Arirang 3	아리랑3	Na Woon-gyu		Drama	
Counterattack	역습	Ahn Jong-hwa		Drama	
Epilogue of Lee Mong-ryong	그 후의 이도령	Lee Gyu-hwan		Historical	
Incident of the 7th Bamboo Flute	칠번통소사건	Na Woon-gyu		Drama, Action	
Rainbow	무지개	Lee Gyu-hwan		Drama	
Songs of Joseon	노래조선	Kim Sang-jin		Music	
Story of Jang-hwa and Hong-ryeon	장화홍련전	Hong Gae-myeong		Historical Drama	
Sweet Dream (Lullaby of Death)	미몽 (죽음의 자장가)	Yang Ju-nam		Drama	
The Story of Hong Gildong	홍길동전 후편	Lee Myeong-u		Historical	
1937
Oh Mong-nyeo	오몽녀	Na Woon-gyu		Drama	
Path of Life	인생항로	Ahn Jong-hwa		Drama	
Straits of Pure Heart	순정해협	Shin Kyeong-gyun		Drama	
The Story of Simcheong	심청전	An Seok-yeong		Historical Drama	
Wanderer	나그네	Lee Gyu-hwan		Drama	
1938
Corps of Youth	청춘부대	Hong Gae-myeong		Drama, Action	
Dosaengrok	도생록	Yun Bong-chun		Drama	
Han River	한강	Baek Un-haeng		Drama	
Military Train	군용열차	Seo Gwang-je		Drama, Enlightenment	
1939
Alter for a Tutelary Deity	성황당	Baek Un-haeng		Drama	
Fisherman's Fire	어화	An Cheol-yeong		Drama	
Fooled by Love, Hurt by Money	사랑에 속고 돈에 울고	Lee Myeong-u		Drama	
Frontier	국경	Choi In-kyu		Drama	
Heartlessness	무정	Park Gi-chae		Drama	
Image of a Wife	처의 모습	Lee Chang-chun		Drama	
New Start	새출발	Lee Gyu-hwan		Drama, Family	
Return Spot	귀착지	Lee Yeong-choon		Drama, Enlightenment	
Song of Compassion	애련송	Kim Yu-yeong		Melodrama	
Virgin	처녀도	Shin Kyeong-gyun		Drama, Family	

== 1940s ==
English Title	Korean Title	Director	Cast	Genre	Notes
1940
Dawn of the Mountain Village	산촌의 여명	Yutaka Yamanaka (Japan)		Drama, Enlightenment	
Garden of Victory	승리의 뜰	Baek Un-haeng		Drama, Enlightenment	
Light of the Sea	바다의 빛	Yutaka Yamanaka (Japan)		Drama, Enlightenment	
Narcissus	수선화	Kim Yu-yeong		Drama	
Pure Heart	청명심	Yutaka Yamanaka (Japan)		Drama, Enlightenment	
Tuition	수업료	Choi In-kyu		Drama, Enlightenment	
1941
A Wife's Moral	아내의 윤리	Kim Yeong-hwa		Drama, Family	
Angeles on the Streets	집없는 천사	Choi In-kyu		Drama, Enlightenment	
Miles Away from Happiness	복지만리	Jeon Chang-keun		Drama, Enlightenment	
You and Me	그대와 나	Heo Yeong		Drama, Enlightenment	
Volunteer	그대와 나	An Seok-yeong		Drama, Enlightenment	
Spring of Korean Peninsula	반도의 봄	Lee Byung-il		Drama	
Blue Sky	창공	Lee Gyu-hwan		Drama	
1942
A Song of Year of Abundance	풍년가	Baek Un-haeng		Drama, Enlightenment	
Frontier	신개지	Yun Bong-chun		Drama	
Historic Remains of Silla Dynasty	신라의 고적	Lee Chang-chun		Documentary	
I Will Go	나는 간다	Park Gi-chae		Drama, Enlightenment	
Rural Life	흙에 산다	An Seok-yeong		Drama, Enlightenment	
1943
Look Up at the Blue Sky	우르러라 창공	Kim Yeong-hwa		Drama, Enlightenment	
Portrait of Youth	젊은 모습	Toyota Shiro (Japan)		Drama, Enlightenment	
Straits of Joseon	조선해협	Park Gi-chae		Drama, Enlightenment	
Suicide Squad of the Watchtower	망루의 결사대	Tadashi Imai (Japan)		Drama, Action	
1944
Children of the Sun	태양의 아이들	Choi In-kyu		Drama, Enlightenment	
Dear Soldier	병정님	Baek Un-haeng		Drama, Enlightenment	
Story of Big Whales	거경전	Baek Un-haeng		Drama, Enlightenment	
1945
Blood and Dirt	혈과 한	Shin Kyeong-gyun		Enlightenment	
Impressive Diary	감격의 일기	Shin Kyeong-gyun		Enlightenment	
Our War	우리들의 전쟁	Shin Kyeong-gyun		Drama, Enlightenment	
Sons of the Sky	신풍의 아들들	Choi In-kyu		Enlightenment	
Vow of Love	사랑과 맹서	Choi In-kyu		Drama, Enlightenment	
1946
Adventure of Ttolttori	똘똘이의 모험	Lee Gyu-hwan		Drama, Children	
The Chronicle of An Jung-Geun	안중근 사기	Lee Gu-yeong		Biography	
The Topography of Jeju island	제주도 풍토기	Lee Yong-min		Documentary	
Viva Freedom!	자유만세	Choi In-kyu		Melodrama, Action	
1947
A New Oath	새로운 맹서	Shin Kyeong-gyun		Drama, Enlightenment	
Dawn of Nation	민족의 새벽	Lee Gyu-hwan		Drama	
Happiness	삼일혁명기	Lee Gyu-hwan		Melodrama	
Mok-Dan Ghost Story	목단등기	Kim So-dong		Horror	
My Liberated Country	해방된 내고향	Jeon Chang-keun		Enlightenment	
Passion of the Sea	바다의 정열	Seo Jeong-gyu		Action	
The Angel Heart	천사의 마음	Kim Jeong-hwan		Drama, Enlightenment	
The Capital of a Winner	패자의 수도	Yu Jang-san		Documentary	
The Immortal Secret Envoy	불멸의 밀사	Seo Jeong-gyu		Biography	
The Samil Revolution	삼일혁명기	Lee Gu-yeong		Historical Drama	
The Wall of the Nation	민족의 성벽	Jeon Chang-keun		Documentary	
The Way They Are Going	그들이 가는 길	Yim Woon-hak		Historical Drama	
Yun Bong-Gil the Martyr	윤봉길 의사	Yun Bong-chun		Biography	
1948
A National Referendum	국민투표	Choi In-kyu		Educational	
A Public Prosecutor and A Teacher	검사와 여선생	Yun Dae-ryong		Drama	
An Innocent Criminal	죄없는 죄인	Choi In-kyu		Drama	
Jiseongtap	지성탑	Kim Jeong-hwan		Historical	
Outcry of the Nation	민족의 절규	An Gyeong-ho		Documentary	
The Face	그 얼굴	Jeon Chang-keun		Melodrama	
The Life of Hong Cha-Ki	홍차기의 일생	Yim Woon-hak		Historical	
The Night before Independence Day	독립전야	Choi In-kyu		Crime	
The Sun of Night	밤의 태양	Park Gi-chae		Action	
The Woman	여인	Jeon Chang-keun		Melodrama	
Yu Gwan-sun	유관순	Yun Bong-chun		Biographical	
