= Kanggeonneo maeul =

1935 Korean film by Na Woon-gyu

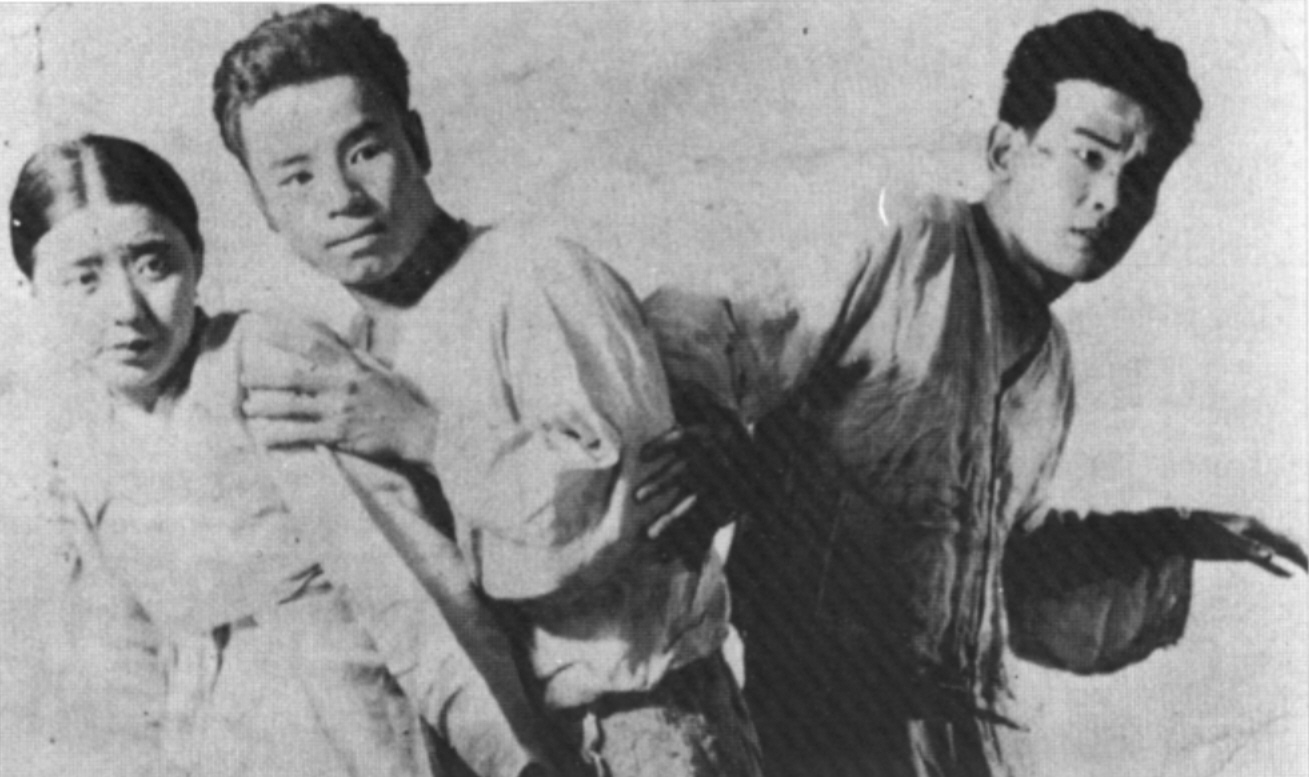
- Kanggeonneo maeul
- Hangul: 강 건너 마을
- Hanja: 江 건너 마을
- RR: Gang geonneo maeul
- MR: Kang kŏnnŏ maŭl
- Directed by: Na Woon-gyu
- Written by: Na Woon-gyu
- Produced by: Cha Sang-eun
- Starring: Hyeon Bang-ran; Jeon Taek-yi; Cha Sang-eun; Yun Bong-chun
- Cinematography: Lee Shin-woong
- Edited by: Na Woon-gyu
- Distributed by: Hanyang Film Co.
- Release date: September 14, 1935
- Language: Korean
- Budget: 3,000 won

Kanggeonneo maeul (Korean: 강 건너 마을; lit. 'The Town Across the River') is a 1935 Korean film directed by Na Woon-gyu. It premiered at the Dansungsa theater in downtown Seoul.

== Plot ==
This film is a melodrama concerning a spoiled only son, played by Jeon Taek-yi. After his father scolds him for his excessive drinking, he sells the family's only cow for money to leave for Seoul. Finding life difficult on his own in Seoul, he returns to his family begging forgiveness.

== Artistic significance ==
The film aimed for socialist realism.

== See also ==
- Korea under Japanese rule
- List of Korean-language films
- Cinema of Korea
