= Arirang geuhu iyagi =

1930 Korean film by Na Woon-gyu

- Film poster
- Hangul: 아리랑 그 후 이야기
- Hanja: 아리랑 그 後 이야기
- RR: Arirang geu hu iyagi
- MR: Arirang kŭ hu iyagi
- Directed by: Lee Koo-yeong
- Written by: Na Woon-gyu; Lee Koo-yeong
- Produced by: Lee Koo-yeong
- Starring: Na Woon-gyu; Lee Woon-kyu; Yoon Bong-choon; Lim Song-suh; Namgung Woon
- Cinematography: Lee Myeong-woo
- Edited by: Lee Myeong-woo
- Distributed by: Won Bang Kak Production
- Release date: 13 January 1930
- Languages: Silent film Korean intertitles
- Budget: 3,000 won

Arirang geuhu iyagi (Korean: 아리랑 그 후 이야기, lit. A Story of the Day after Arirang), also known as Arirang 2 (Korean: 아리랑 후편; RR: Arirang hupyeon), is a 1930 Korean film written by and starring Na Woon-gyu. It premiered at Dan Sung Sa Theater in downtown Seoul. The film was followed by another sequel, Arirang 3.

== Plot ==
In this sequel to Arirang (1926), Choi Yeong-jin, the mentally ill lead character of the first film, returns home from prison to find his father and sister deep in debt. The film ends with Young-jin again being sent to prison for sentence of murder.

== See also ==
- Korea under Japanese rule
- List of Korean-language films
- Cinema of Korea
