= Geumganghan =

1931 Korean film by Na Woon-gyu

- Na Woon-gyu in Geumganghan (1931)
- Hangul: 금강한
- Hanja: 金剛恨
- RR: Geumganghan
- MR: Kŭmganghan
- Directed by: Na Woon-gyu
- Written by: Lee Chang-yong
- Produced by: Won San Man
- Starring: Na Woon-gyu; Kim Jung-sook; Wonsanman; So Won Sho Choon
- Cinematography: Lee Chang-yong
- Edited by: Lee Chang-yong
- Distributed by: Wonsanman Production
- Release date: 13 January 1931
- Languages: Silent film Korean intertitles
- Budget: 3,000 won

Geumganghan (Korean: 금강한; lit. 'The Grief of Geumgang') is a 1931 Korean silent film written by Lee Chang-yong. It was directed by and starred Na Woon-gyu. The film premiered at Dansungsa theater in downtown Seoul.

== Plot ==
The film concerns the playboy son of a rich man. After he gets a village girl pregnant, she commits suicide. The playboy is later murdered by his ex-wife.

== See also ==
- Korea under Japanese rule
- List of Korean-language films
- Cinema of Korea
