= Deaf Sam-yong =

Deaf Sam-yong may refer to:

- Deaf Sam-yong (1929 film), Korean film
- Deaf Sam-yong (1964 film), Korean film
