= Muhwagwa =

1935 Korean film by Na Woon-gyu

- Jeon Choon-woo and Yun Bong-Choon in Muhwagwa (1935)
- Hangul: 무화과
- Hanja: 無花果
- RR: Muhwagwa
- MR: Muhwagwa
- Directed by: Na Woon-gyu
- Written by: Yun Geum-kwan
- Produced by: Hyeon Seong-wan
- Starring: Yun Bong-Choon; Jeon Choon-woo; Hyeon Bang-ran; Lee Bok-bun
- Cinematography: Son Yong-jin
- Edited by: Na Woon-gyu
- Distributed by: Chosun Kinema
- Release date: June 30, 1935
- Language: Korean
- Budget: 2,000 won

Muhwagwa (Korean: 무화과, Fig Tree) is a 1935 Korean film directed by Na Woon-gyu. It premiered at the Umigwan theater.

== Plot ==
This film is a melodrama in which Yun Bong-Choon stars as a violinist in love with a dancer played by Jeon Choon-woo. Their relationship is ruined by the interference of a rich man, played by Lee Bok-bun.

== See also ==
- Korea under Japanese rule
- List of Korean-language films
- Cinema of Korea
