= Jongno (film) =

1933 Korean film by Na Woon-gyu

- Na Woon-gyu in Jongno (1933)
- Hangul: 종로
- Hanja: 鍾路
- RR: Jongno
- MR: Chongno
- Directed by: Yang Chul
- Written by: Na Woon-gyu
- Produced by: Yang Chul
- Starring: Na Woon-gyu; Kim Yeon-sil; Lim Sung-chul; Yang Chul
- Cinematography: Son Yong-jin
- Edited by: Na Woon-gyu
- Distributed by: Dae Koo Film Studio
- Release date: 5 June 1933
- Country: Korea
- Languages: Silent film Korean intertitles
- Budget: 2,800 won

Jongno (Korean: 종로) is a 1933 Korean silent film starring Na Woon-gyu. It premiered at the Dansungsa theater in downtown Seoul.

== Plot ==
The film is a melodrama in which Na Woon-gyu's character breaks up with his girlfriend and becomes a vagabond. The girlfriend marries another man. When Na returns and discovers her married, he leaves again.

== See also ==
- Korea under Japanese rule
- List of Korean-language films
- Cinema of Korea
