= Geurimja =

1935 Korean film by Na Woon-gyu

- Na Woon-gyu in Geurimja
- Hangul: 그림자
- RR: Geurimja
- MR: Kŭrimja
- Directed by: Na Woon-gyu
- Written by: Na Woon-gyu
- Produced by: Hyeon Sung-wan
- Starring: Na Woon-gyu; Hyeon Bang-ran; Yun Bong-choon; Lee Bock-bon
- Cinematography: Son Yong-jin
- Edited by: Son Yong-jin
- Distributed by: Chosun Kinema Co.
- Release date: September 27, 1935
- Language: Korean
- Budget: 2,000 won

Geurimja (Korean: 그림자; lit. 'Shadow') is a 1935 Korean film directed by Na Woon-gyu. It premiered at the Umigwan theater.

== Plot ==
The story is a melodrama concerning a young woman, played by Yun Bong-chun, who is abused by her stepmother and half-sister. After her stepmother expels her from her home, she stabs her stepmother.

== See also ==
- Korea under Japanese rule
- List of Korean-language films
- Cinema of Korea
