= Ok-nyeo =

1928 Korean film by Na Woon-gyu

- Hangul: 옥녀
- Hanja: 玉女
- RR: Oknyeo
- MR: Ongnyŏ
- Directed by: Na Woon-gyu
- Written by: Na Woon-gyu
- Produced by: Park Seung-pil or Na Woon-gyu (Kim Kab-ui says Park, IMDB says Na)
- Starring: Jeon Ok; Ju Sam-son; Na Woon-gyu; Yoon Bong-Chun; Lee Kyeong-seon; Park Jeong-seop; Lee Geum-ryong; Kim Yeon-shil
- Cinematography: Lee Chang-yong
- Edited by: Na Woon-gyu
- Distributed by: Na Woon-gyu Productions
- Release date: 28 January 1928
- Running time: (1,899 feet)
- Country: Korea
- Languages: Silent film Korean intertitles

Ok-nyeo (Korean: 옥녀) is a 1928 Korean film. The silent, black-and-white production was written, directed, and edited by Na Woon-gyu. It was the second film to be produced by Na Woon-gyu Productions, which was financed by Park Seung-pil, owner of the Dansungsa theater in Seoul. It premiered at Park's Theater in January 1928.

== Plot ==
The two brothers form a love triangle fighting over a woman called oknyeo, and the elder brother is sacrificed through the fighting while covering up for his younger brother's sins for the happiness of his younger brother.

== Themes ==
The film was heavily influenced by the enlightment movement at the time.

== Reception ==
After watching the test screening of the film, The Dong-A Ilbo at the time commented that although it is understandable that horrific things can happen if the emotions of love and lust goes to the extreme, yet could not find anything in Oknyeo's attitude that would lead to such a fight and it would be an exaggeration for such an incident to happen in Korea but it acknowledged the commercial values in that it somehow made the story beautiful.

== See also ==
- List of Korean-language films
- Cinema of Korea
