= Jalitgeola =

1927 Korean film by Na Woon-gyu

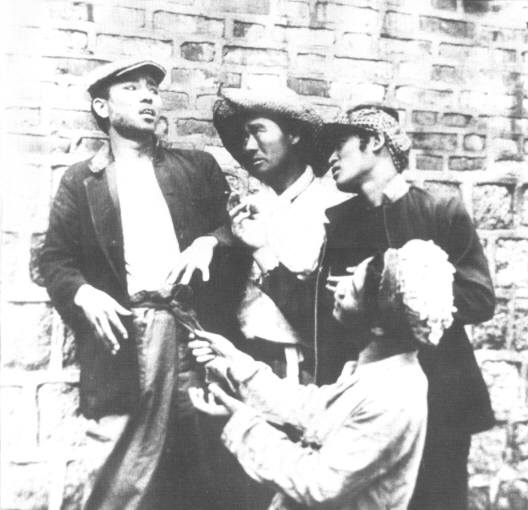
- Na Woon-gyu in Jalitgeola (1927)
- Hangul: 잘 있거라
- RR: Jal itgeora
- MR: Chal itkŏra
- Directed by: Na Woon-gyu
- Written by: Na Woon-gyu
- Produced by: Park Seung-pil; Na Woon-gyu
- Starring: Lee Geum-ryong (Min Beom-sik); Lee Kyeong-seon (Seong Doo-hyeon)
- Cinematography: Lee Chang-yong
- Edited by: Na Woon-gyu
- Distributed by: Na Woon-gyu Productions
- Release date: 5 November 1927
- Running time: (1,703 ft)
- Country: Korea
- Languages: Silent film Korean intertitles

Jalitgeola (Korean: 잘 있거라; lit. 'Farewell') is a 1927 Korean film. The silent, black and white film was written, directed, produced, edited by and starred Na Woon-gyu (1902–1937). This was the first film from Na's own production company, Na Woon-gyu Productions, financed by Park Seung-pil, owner of the Danseongsa theater in Seoul. The film premiered at the Dansungsa theater in November 1927.

== Plot ==
This film is a melodrama telling a story of greed and lust. It begins with millionaire Min Bum-shik's wife and a steward plotting Min's murder in order to collect his money. Rapes, murder and prison sentences follow in the convoluted plot.

== Cast ==
- Kim Yeon-shil (Hong Ryeon)
- Joo Sam-son (Park Jeong-song)
- Jeon Ok (Hwang Soon-nyeo)
- Na Woon-gyu (Kyeong Ho)
- Park Jeong-seop (Soon-nyeo's father, Hwang Seon-dal)
- Yoon Bong-Chun
- Ahn In-ok (Park Cha-song)
- Park Gap-deuk

== See also ==
- List of Korean-language films
- Cinema of Korea
