= Oh Mong-nyeo =

1937 Korean film Na Woon-gyu

- Oh Mong-nyeo
- Hangul: 오몽녀
- Hanja: 五夢女
- RR: Omongnyeo
- MR: Omongnyŏ
- Directed by: Na Woon-gyu
- Written by: Lee Tae-jun
- Produced by: Hyeon Sung-wan
- Starring: Yun Bong-chun; No Jae-shin; Kim Il-hae; Lim Woon-hak
- Cinematography: Lee Myeong-woo
- Edited by: Lee Myeong-woo
- Distributed by: Kyeong Sung Studio
- Release date: January 20, 1937
- Language: Korean
- Budget: 10,000 Won

Oh Mong-nyeo (Korean: 오몽녀) is a 1937 Korean film, the last film directed by Na Woon-gyu. It premiered at the Dansungsa theater in downtown Seoul.

== Plot summary ==
This literary adaptation tells the story of Oh Mong-nyeo, a young woman living with her adopted father in a seaside village. When men in the village attempt to rape her, she escapes by boat with her boyfriend to seek a better life elsewhere.

== See also ==
- Korea under Japanese rule
- List of Korean-language films
- Cinema of Korea
