= Gaehwadang imun =

1932 Korean film by Na Woon-gyu

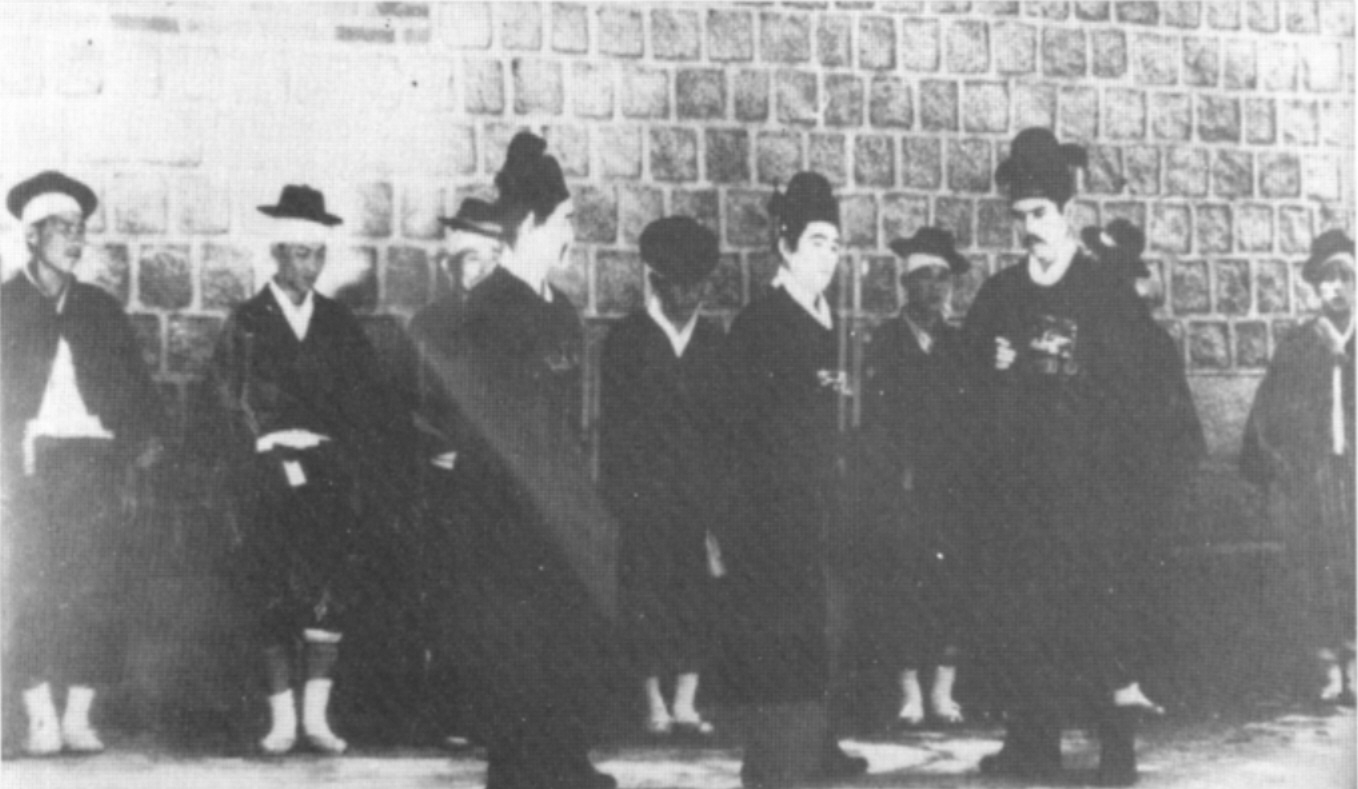
- Na Woon-gyu in Gaehwadang imun (1932)
- Hangul: 개화당 이문
- Hanja: 開化黨 異聞
- RR: Gaehwadang imun
- MR: Kaehwadang imun
- Directed by: Na Woon-gyu
- Written by: Na Woon-gyu
- Produced by: Kang Jeong-won
- Starring: Yun Bong-chun; Lim Woon-hak; Ha So-yeong; Na Woon-gyu
- Cinematography: Son Yong-jin
- Edited by: Na Woon-gyu
- Distributed by: Yu Shin Kinema
- Release date: 9 June 1932
- Country: Korea
- Languages: Silent film Korean intertitles
- Budget: 1,500 won

Gaehwadang imun (Korean: 개화당 이문) is a 1932 Korean silent film written, directed by and starring Na Woon-gyu. It premiered at Dansungsa theater in downtown Seoul.

== Plot summary ==
The film concerns the 3-day rule of Kim Ok-kyun (1851–1894), and his attempt to modernize Korea.

== See also ==
- Korea under Japanese rule
- List of Korean-language films
- Cinema of Korea
