= Incident of the 7th Bamboo Flute =

1936 Korean film by Na Woon-gyu

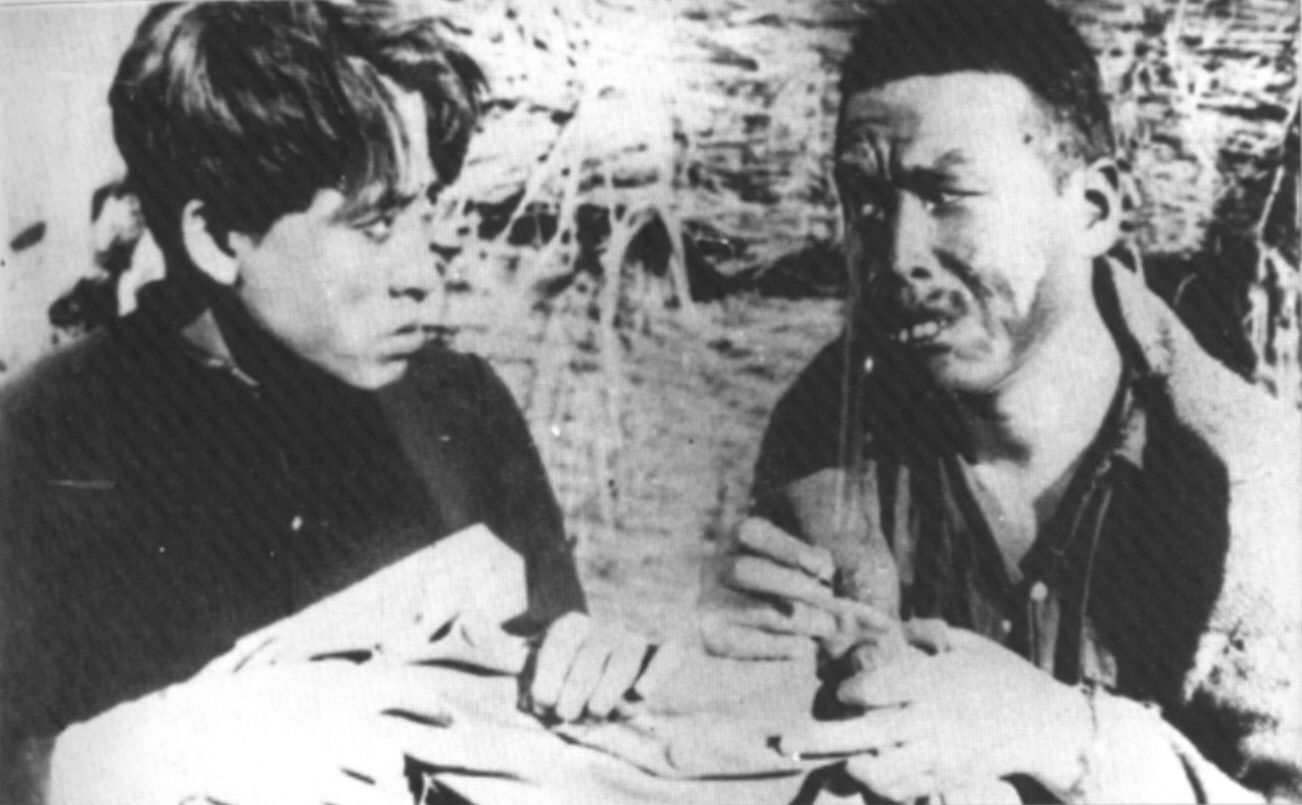
- Na Woon-gyu (left) in Chilbeontong sosageon.
- Hangul: 칠번통 소사건
- Hanja: 七番通 小事件
- RR: Chilbeontong sosageon
- MR: Ch'ilbŏnt'ong sosakŏn
- Directed by: Na Woon-gyu
- Written by: Na Woon-gyu
- Produced by: Hyeon Sung-wan
- Starring: Lim Woon-hak; Na Woon-gyu; Hyeon Bang-ran; Park Sook-ja
- Cinematography: Son Yong-jin
- Edited by: Na Woon-gyu
- Distributed by: Chosun Kinema Co.
- Release date: November 15, 1936
- Language: Korean
- Budget: 2,000 won

Incident of the 7th Bamboo Flute (Korean: 칠번통 소사건) is a 1936 Korean film written, directed, edited by and starring Na Woon-gyu. It premiered at the Umigwan theater.

== Plot ==
This action-oriented film tells the story of a traveling theatrical troupe. When one of the actresses is sold to criminals running an opium den, Na Woon-gyu's character rescues her and returns her to the troupe.

== See also ==
- Korea under Japanese rule
- List of Korean-language films
- Cinema of Korea
