= Geumbungeo =

1927 Korean film by Na Woon-gyu

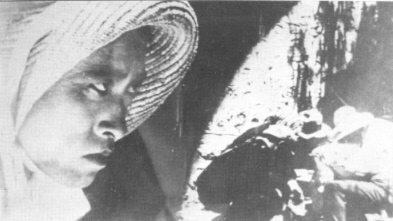
- Na Woon-gyu in Geumbungeo (1927)
- Hangul: 금붕어
- Hanja: 金붕어
- RR: Geumbungeo
- MR: Kŭmbungŏ
- Directed by: Na Woon-gyu
- Produced by: Hyeon Seong-wan
- Starring: Na Woon-gyu; Yun Bong-chun; Shin Il-seon; Hong Gae-myeong
- Cinematography: Lee Chang-yong
- Edited by: Na Woon-gyu
- Release date: 6 July 1927
- Country: Korea
- Languages: Silent film Korean intertitles

Geumbungeo (Korean: 금붕어; lit. 'Goldfish') is a 1927 Korean silent film. The black-and-white film was directed, edited by and starred Na Woon-gyu (1902–1937).

== Sources ==
- Geumbungeo at IMDb
- "The Golden Fish (Geumbung-eo)". Korean Film Archive. Archived from the original on 27 September 2007.

== See also ==
- List of Korean-language films
- Cinema of Korea
