= Cheolindo =

1930 Korean film by Na Woon-gyu

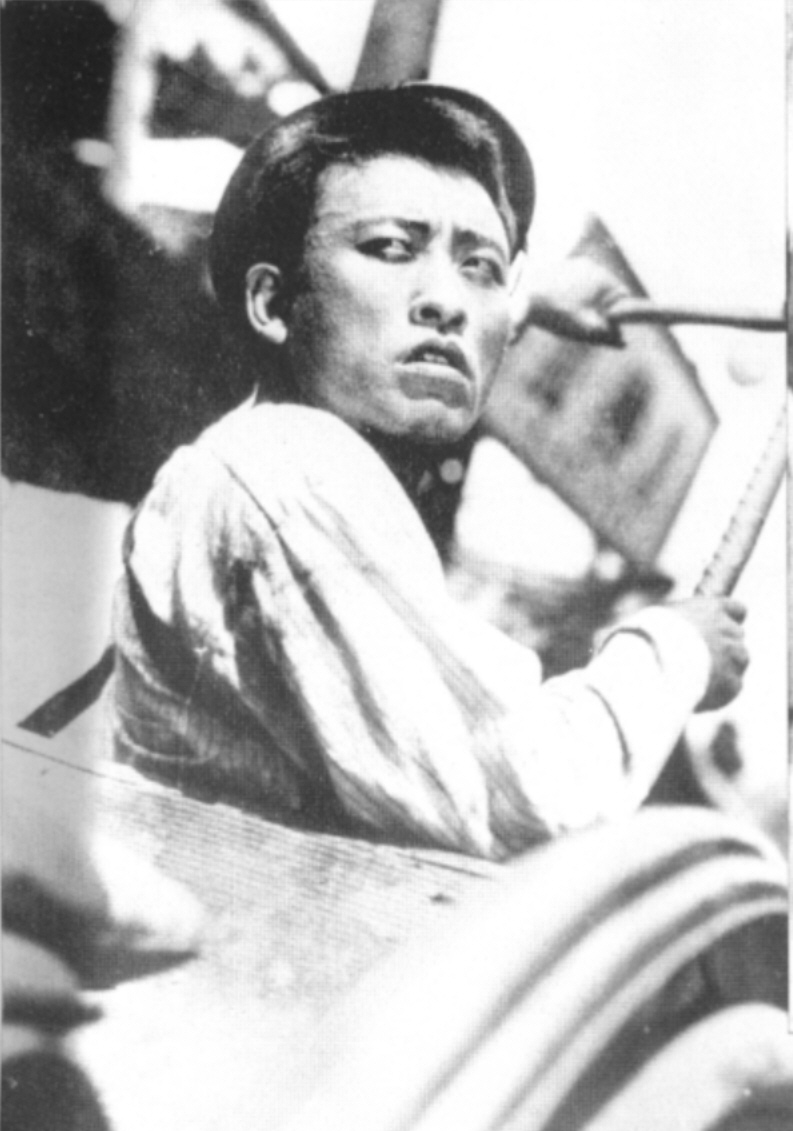
- Na Woon-gyu in Cheolindo (1930)
- Hangul: 철인도
- Hanja: 鐵人都
- RR: Cheorindo
- MR: Ch'ŏrindo
- Directed by: Na Woon-gyu
- Written by: Na Woon-gyu
- Produced by: Park Jung-hyeon
- Starring: Na Woon-gyu; Lim Woon-hak; Kim Yeon-sil; Park Jae-haeng
- Cinematography: Lee Myeong-woo
- Edited by: Na Woon-gyu
- Distributed by: Won Bang Kak Production
- Release date: 14 April 1930
- Country: Korea
- Languages: Silent film Korean intertitles
- Budget: 3,000 won

Cheolindo (Korean: 철인도) is a 1930 Korean silent film written, directed by and starring Na Woon-gyu. It premiered at Dansungsa Theater in downtown Seoul.

== Plot summary ==
The plot concerns two rival villages separated by a hill and the competition between men from both villages over the daughter of Reverend Suh.

== See also ==
- Korea under Japanese rule
- List of Korean-language films
- Cinema of Korea
