= Jeon Ok =

South Korean actress (1911–1969)

- Portrait of Jeon
- Born: Jeon Deok-rye; April 2, 1911; Hamhung, Kankyōnan Province, Korea, Empire of Japan
- Died: October 22, 1969 (aged 58); Seoul, South Korea
- Occupations: Actress; singer
- Years active: 1927–1969

Korean name
- Hangul: 전덕례
- Hanja: 全德禮
- RR: Jeon Deokrye
- MR: Chŏn Tŏngnye

Stage name
- Hangul: 전옥
- Hanja: 全玉
- RR: Jeon Ok
- MR: Chŏn Ok

Jeon Ok (Korean: 전옥; April 2, 1911 – October 22, 1969) was a Korean actress and singer. Jeon was referred to as "Queen of Tears" for her excellence at acting for tragic dramas.

== Biography ==
Jeon Ok was born Jeon Deok-rye on April 2, 1911 in Hamhung, Kankyōnan Province, Korea, Empire of Japan (now South Hamgyong Province, North Korea). When Jeon was 15 years old, she was introduced to the film industry by her brother. Jeon aspired to be an actress in Towolhoe (토월회), her debut role was as a supporting actress in the 1927 film Jal itgeora (잘 있거라), directed by Na Woon-gyu. Jeon gained popularity after taking a lead role in Arirang Gogae (아리랑고개), based on Park Seung-hui (박승희) and produced by Towolhoe. However, when the theatre closed, she moved to Joseon Yeongeuksa in 1930. Jeon was noted for her monologues as well as her tragic performances which often brought audiences to tears, so she was dubbed the "Queen of Tragedy" or "Queen of Tears". After the liberation of Korea, Jeon was mainly active in film.

== Personal life ==
Jeon Ok married Kang Hong-shik, an actor, film director and singer. Kang Hong-shik and Jeon Ok were the first married couple in Korean entertainment history. Their daughters, Kang Hyo-shil and Kang Hyo-son, became their parents' step. Later, Jeon and Kang divorced. Kang went over to North Korea along with Hyo-son who later became a famous actress in North Korea. Kang Hong-shik was honored as "Merited artist" as well. Meanwhile, Hyo-sil married Choi Moo-ryong, a popular actor of the 1960s and 1970s. Choi then had an affair with Kim Ji-mee, the most popular Korean actress of that time, so that Choi and Kang divorced in 1962. Jeon's grandson is Choi Min-soo between Choi Moo-ryong and Hyo-shil, who is also a famous active actor.

Jeon met her second husband Choe Il, who was a former football coach of Pyongyang Football Team and also engaged in her entertainment business when she reestablished Namhae yeneungdae (남해예능대) into (백조가극단) in 1946.

Jeon ran an orchid in Deoksong-ri, Byeollae-myeon, Yangju, Gyeonggi Province. Jeon died of her chronic diseases, high blood pressure, kidney failure on October 22, 1969.

== Filmography ==
*Note; the whole list is referenced.

English title	Korean title	Romanization	Year	Role	Director
	Woman in the Deluxe Suite		Teughosil yeojasonnim		
	The Second Wife		Huchwidaeg		
	A Swordsman in the Twilight		Hwanghonui Geomgaek		
	A Heavenly Peach Flower		Cheondohwa		
	A Traveling King		Nageune Imgeum		
	Mountain		San		
	A Water Mill		Mullebanga		
	The Dead and the Alive		Jugeun Jawa San Ja		
	Hwang, Man of Wealth at Mapo		Mapo Saneun Hwangbuja		
	The Door of the Body		Yukche-ui Mun		
	The Sino-Japanese War and Queen Min, the Heroine		Cheong-iljeonjaenggwa yeogeol Minbi		
	Just Watch What We Do and See		Dugoman Bose-yo		
	My Wife Is Confessing		Anaeneun Gobaekhanda		
	Don't Sing, Water Bird		Uljimara Mulsae-ya		
	For My Husband		Mangbuseok		
	Goryeojang		Goryeojang		
	Rice		Ssal		
	King Cheoljong and Bongnyeo		Cheoljonghwa Bongnyeo		
	My Old Jealous Wife		Gangjjasodong		
	Black Hood		Heukdu-geon		
	Mother's Love		Moseong-ae		
	A Sad Cry		Bulleodo Daedab-eomneun Ireumi-yeo		
	Prince Yeonsan		Yeonsan-gun		
	Over the Hill		Jeo eondeog-eul neom-eoseo		
	A Revival		Jaesaeng		
	Nameless Stars		Ireumeomneun Byeoldeul		
	A Beautiful Woman		Areumdaun Yeoin		
	Terms of Marriage		Gyeolhonjogeon		
	A Blood Bamboo		Hanmalpungungwa Minchungjeonggong		
	The Tears of Mokpo		Mokpo-ui nunmul		
1958	The Lullaby		Jajangga		
	The Tears		Nunmul		
	An Empty Dream		Hwaryuchunmong		
	The Snow Falling Night		Nunnalineun bam		
	Chunhyang-jeon		Chunhyangjeon		
	A Night at a Harbor		Hanggu-ui il-ya		
	The Lost Youth		Ilh-eobeolin cheongchun		
	The Wave of Love		Aejeongpado		
	Mr. Soldier		Byeongjeongnim		
	Suicide Squad of the Watchtower		Manglu-ui gyeolsadae		
	Miles Away from Happiness]		Bok-ji-man-li		
	Ok-nyeo		Oknyeo		
	Looking for Love - Going across River Doomankang		Salang-eul chaj-aseo		
	Farewell		Jal issgeola		
	Seekers of Paradise		Nag-won-eul chajneun mulideul		

== Awards ==
- 1958, Korean Stage Art Association Awards (한국무대예술원상)
