= Deuljwi =

1927 Korean film by Na Woon-gyu

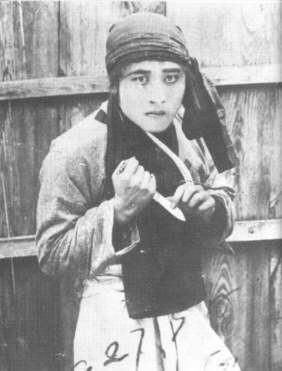
- Na Woon-gyu in Deuljwi (1927)
- Hangul: 들쥐
- RR: Deuljwi
- MR: Tŭlchwi
- Directed by: Na Woon-gyu
- Written by: Na Woon-gyu
- Produced by: Hyeon Seong-wan
- Starring: Na Woon-gyu; Shin Il-seon; Ju Sam-son; Yun Bong-chun; Lee Geum-yong
- Cinematography: Lee Chang-yong
- Edited by: Na Woon-gyu
- Distributed by: Choseon Kinema
- Release date: 14 April 1927
- Running time: 80 minutes
- Country: Korea
- Languages: Silent film Korean intertitles
- Budget: 800 won

Deuljwi (Korean: 들쥐; lit. 'Field Mouse') is a 1927 Korean silent film written, directed, edited by and starring Na Woon-gyu (1902–1937). It premiered at the Danseongsa Theater in Seoul.

== Plot ==
The plot concerns a young couple who have made a marriage vow with each other. Their marriage is thwarted when the woman is forced to marry a rich gangster. A fighter for justice called "Deuljwi(Field Mouse)" stops the wedding, kills the gangsters, and returns the bride to her betrothed.

== Reception ==
The film was considered to be a work of art that symbolically represented the invasiveness of Japanese colonialists, with the rich gangster being the Japanese and the man who was stolen of his potential wife being the Korean nation. It was banned by the Japanese authorities on the day after its release. The film was the first Korean film to be banned, but was able to be screened after cuts.

== See also ==
- List of Korean-language films
- Cinema of Korea
