= Sarangeul chajaseo =

1929 Korean film by Na Woon-gyu

Sarangeul chajaseo (In Search of Love)
- Na Woon-gyu in Salangeul chajaseo (In Search of Love) (1929)
- Hangul: 사랑을 찾아서
- RR: Sarangeul chajaseo
- MR: Sarangŭl ch'ajasŏ
- Directed by: Na Woon-gyu
- Written by: Na Woon-gyu
- Produced by: Na Woon-gyu
- Starring: Na Woon-gyu; Lee Geum-ryong; Jeon Ok; Yun Bong-chun
- Cinematography: Lee Chang-yong
- Edited by: Na Woon-gyu
- Distributed by: Na Woon-gyu Productions
- Release date: 10 April 1929
- Running time: (1,512 ft)
- Country: Korea
- Languages: Silent film Korean intertitles
- Budget: 3,500 won

Sarangeul chajaseo (Korean: 사랑을 찾아서; lit. 'In Search of Love, or Looking For Love') is a 1929 Korean silent film written, directed, produced, edited by and starring Na Woon-gyu (1902-1937). The film premiered at the Choson Theater in April 1929. More than one thousand extras from Na's hometown Hoeryong were employed in the filming of Sarangeul chajaseo, making the film into a symbolic epic national exodus as a protest against the Japanese occupation of Korea. Originally entitled Crossing the Duman River (두만강을 건너서), the film was banned and censored by the Japanese occupying authorities after its first showing. Popular demand caused it to be re-released, though in a heavily edited form, and renamed In Search of Love. As with the vast majority of Korean films of this era, Sarangeul chajaseo is a lost film.

== Production ==
The film was shot using 14 35mm films.

== Plot summary ==
The plot concerns three characters who have lost hope in continuing their lives in Korea—Kokosu (Lee Geum-ryong), an old man who has lost his farmland; Dong-min (Na Woon-gyu); and Jong-hui (Jeong Ok), who had been betrayed by her boyfriend. Kokosu had been a bugler in the Korean military during the last days of the Korean Empire. Seeking a better life in northeast China, the three are attacked by Chinese "majeok" bandits and the Japanese while attempting the ice-covered Tumen River crossing of the China–North Korea border . With his last breath, Kokosu blows the army bugle he had carried with him all his life. Dong-min takes the bugle and continues playing it.

== See also ==
- List of Korean-language films
- Cinema of Korea

== Literature ==
『한국영화전사』(이영일,삼애사,1969)
