= Punguna =

1926 Korean film by Na Woon-gyu

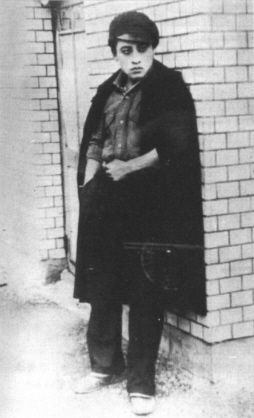
- Na Woon-gyu in Punguna (1926)
- Hangul: 풍운아
- Hanja: 風雲兒
- RR: Punguna
- MR: P'unguna
- Directed by: Na Woon-gyu
- Written by: Na Woon-gyu
- Produced by: Hyeon Seong-wan
- Starring: Na Woon-gyu (Nicolai Park); Yoon Seong-sil (Kang Hyu-ok)
- Cinematography: Lee Chang-yong
- Edited by: Na Woon-gyu
- Distributed by: Choson Kinema Productions
- Release date: 18 December 1926
- Running time: (1,795 ft)
- Languages: Silent film Korean intertitles
- Budget: 1,000 won

Punguna (Korean: 풍운아, Soldier of Fortune) is a 1926 Korean film. The silent, black-and-white film was written, directed, edited by and starred Na Woon-gyu (1902-1937). It premiered at the Choson Theater in December 1926.

== Plot summary ==
In Punguna, Na Woon-gyu plays the role of Nicolai Park, a veteran of the Russian army, who has returned to Korea from European battlefields. Broke, hungry, and unable to find employment, he is taken in as a boarder by Kim Chang-ho. Chang-ho's friend, Cha-duk becomes romantically involved with Hae-ok, who had sold herself to support her parents. Cha-duk's wife, Yeong-ja becomes involved with Nicolai, who rejects her proposal to run away with him. The romantic complications spiral until Yeong-ja kills Cha-duk. The film ends with Nicolai departing for destinations unknown while the other boarders bid him farewell.

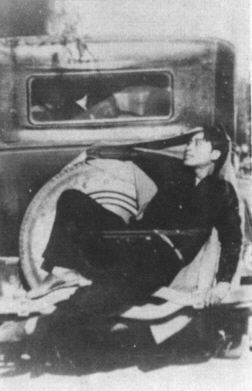

== Cast ==
Ju In-gyu (Ahn Jae-deok)
Kim Jeong-suk (Choi Yeong-ja)
Nam Gung-ung (Kim Chang-ho)
Joo Sam-son (Jeong Gu-jin)
Lim Woon-hak (Shin Do-seong)
Lee Gyeong-seon (Gwak Cheol-san)
Hong Myeong-seon (Cheon Il-hak)

== See also ==
- Korea under Japanese rule
- List of Korean-language films
- Cinema of Korea
