= Deaf Sam-yong (1929 film) =

1929 Korean film by Na Woon-gyu

Pŏngŏri Samnyong
- Hangul: 벙어리 삼룡
- Hanja: 벙어리 三龍
- RR: Beongeori Samryong
- MR: Pŏngŏri Samnyong
- Directed by: Na Woon-gyu
- Written by: Na Woon-gyu
- Produced by: Baek Chan-gi or Na Woon-gyu
- Starring: Na Woon-gyu (Beongeori Samryong); Yu Shin-bang; Ju Sam-son (Oh Saeng-weon's son); Lee Geum-yong (Oh Saeng-weon); and 1,000 extras
- Cinematography: Son Yong-jin
- Distributed by: Na Woon Kyu Productions
- Release date: 19 January 1929
- Running time: (1,572 ft)
- Languages: Silent film Korean intertitles
- Budget: 3,000 won

Pŏngŏri Samnyong (Korean: 벙어리 삼룡), also known as Deaf Sam-yong, is a 1929 Korean silent film written, directed, produced by and starring Na Woon-gyu (1902–1937). It premiered at the Choseon Theater in January 1929. It was the fifth film produced by Na Woon-gyu Productions, and its failure with the public was blamed for the bankruptcy of that company.

== Plot summary ==
The plot concerns Samnyong, a deaf servant who is in love with his landlord's daughter-in-law. Critics praised the final scene of the film, in which the house burns, as a work of pioneering and experimental film making.

== 1964 remake ==
In 1964 Shin Sang-ok directed Deaf Sam-yong, a remake of Pŏngŏri Samnyong which won the Grand Bell (Daejong) Award in 1965 for Best Picture.

== See also ==
- List of Korean-language films
- Cinema of Korea
