= Arirang 3 =

1936 Korean film by Na Woon-gyu

- Arirang 3
- Hangul: 아리랑 3편
- Hanja: 아리랑 3篇
- RR: Arirang 3pyeon
- MR: Arirang 3p'yŏn
- Directed by: Na Woon-gyu
- Written by: Na Woon-gyu
- Produced by: Cha Sang-eun
- Starring: Na Woon-gyu; Hyeon Bang-ran; Jun Taek-yi; Yun Bong-choon
- Cinematography: Lee Shin-woong
- Edited by: Yang Joo-nam
- Distributed by: Han Yang Film Co.
- Release date: 15 May 1936
- Language: Korean
- Budget: 15,000 won

Arirang 3 (Korean: 아리랑 3편) is a 1936 Korean film directed by and starring Na Woon-gyu. The second sequel of Na's ground-breaking 1926 film, Arirang, this was the only entry in the series that was not silent. It premiered at the DanSungSa Theater in downtown Seoul.

== Plot ==
This third and last installment in the story of the mentally ill student, Choi Yeong-jin, begins with him being released from prison. He attempts to live a peaceful existence until he witnesses the rape of his sister, at which point his mental problems return.

== See also ==
- Korea under Japanese rule
- List of Korean-language films
- Cinema of Korea
