= A Ferry Boat That Has No Owner =

1932 Korean film by Na Woon-gyu

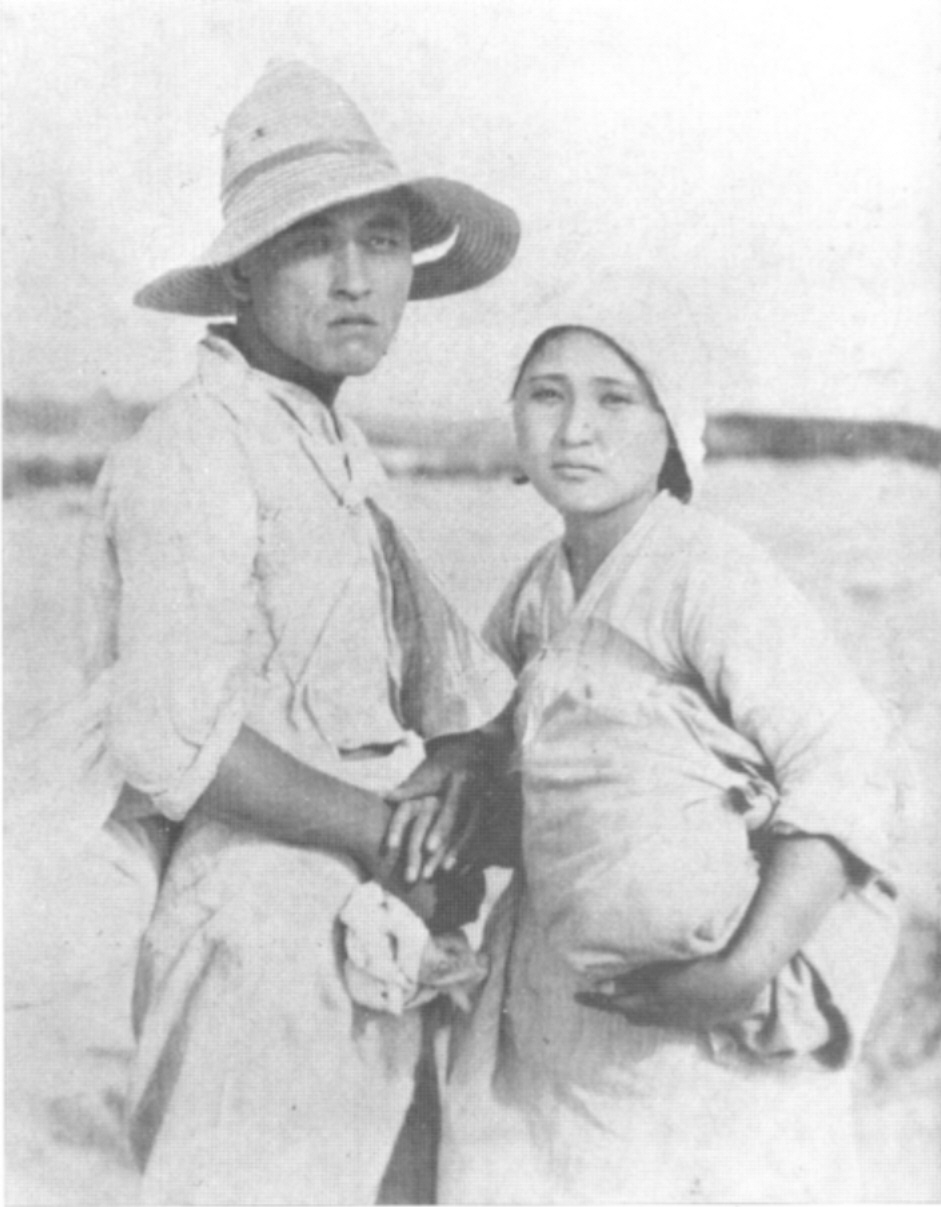
- Na Woon-gyu and Moon Ye-bong in the film
- Hangul: 임자없는 나룻배
- RR: Imjaeomneun narutbae
- MR: Imjaŏmnŭn naruppae
- Directed by: Lee Kyu-hwan
- Written by: Lee Kyu-hwan
- Produced by: Kang Jeong-won
- Starring: Na Woon-gyu; Moon Yae-bong; Kim Yeon-sil; Lim Woon-hak
- Cinematography: Lee Myeong-woo
- Edited by: Lee Kyu-hwan
- Distributed by: Yoo Shin Kinema Company
- Release date: 14 September 1932
- Country: Korea
- Languages: Silent film Korean intertitles
- Budget: 1,200 won

A Ferry Boat That Has No Owner (Korean: 임자없는 나룻배) is a 1932 Korean film starring Na Woon-gyu. Its title is also translated as "The Ownerless Ferry Boat". The film premiered at Dansungsa theater in downtown Seoul. This was director Lee Gyu-hwan's first film. The film is significant as the last pre-liberation film that was able to present an openly nationalistic message, because of increasing governmental censorship at this time. The film is considered lost.

== Plot ==
The story follows Soo-sam, a farmer who moves to Seoul to work as a rickshaw driver. He is imprisoned for stealing money to cover his wife's hospital expenses. After his release, he discovers that his wife has been unfaithful. Disheartened, Soo-sam returns to his village with his daughter and takes up work as a ferry boat operator. When a bridge is built a decade later, it renders his job obsolete. Following an attempted rape of his daughter by the bridge engineer, Soo-sam dies while trying to destroy the bridge and is struck by a train. With their home destroyed by fire and his daughter killed, Soo-sam's ferry boat remains as the "ownerless ferryboat" mentioned in the title. The original final scene had Soo-sam taking an axe to the bridge. This was cut by governmental censors because, as Lee says, "to axe the bridge was to describe the anger of the Korean people against the Japanese occupation."

== See also ==
- Korea under Japanese rule
- List of Korean-language films
