= Righteous Revenge =

1919 film considered the first in Korea

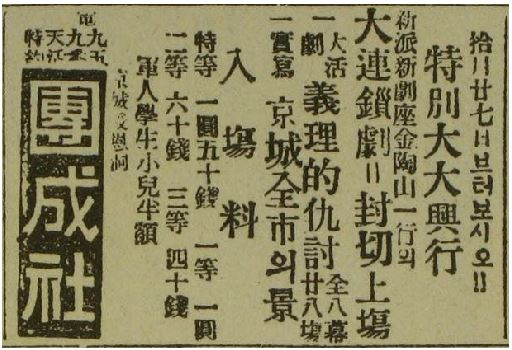
- An advertisement for the film in the Maeil Sinbo (1919)
- Hangul: 의리적 구토
- Hanja: 義理的仇討
- RR: Uirijeok guto
- MR: Ŭirijŏk kut'o
- Screenplay by: Kim Do-san
- Produced by: Park Seong-pil
- Release dates: October 27, 1919 (Dansungsa, Seoul)
- Country: Korea, Empire of Japan
- Language: Korean

Righteous Revenge (Korean: 의리적 구토 or 의리적 구투), sometimes Loyal Revenge or Screaming for Vengeance, was a Korean kino-drama (a stageplay with a film backdrop). It was directed by Kim Do-san and premiered on October 27, 1919, at the historic movie theater Dansungsa. It is widely considered the first ever Korean movie, including by the South Korean government, although this label is disputed. The film and its script are now considered lost.

The anniversary of its premiere date is now considered Korean Film Day. Just before the premiere of the film, the companion documentary film (used for backdrops in the movie) Panoramic View of the Whole City of Gyeongseong was debuted. This film is sometimes considered the first, although it did not have actors or a plot.

== Description ==
The script was written by Kim Do-san and produced by Park Seong-pil. Kim also acted as the lead character. The story focuses on the character of Song-san, who defends his father's inheritance from his stepmother and other family members. The story has been interpreted as symbolic of Korean independence activism during the Japanese colonial period.

The kino-drama performed well, selling 100,000 tickets. The Maeil Sinbo newspaper wrote that "at the premiere at Dansungsa, people flooded in. They filled the lower and upper floors within seconds. The theater was so packed that no more tickets could be sold". The success of the kino-drama motivated Park to fund the production of more kino-dramas and films.

The kino-drama has been recently been mentioned alongside the landmark 2019 South Korean film Parasite, which was released around the 100th anniversary of the kino-drama.

== Debate over first Korean film status ==
The kino-drama was released on the same day as and after its companion documentary film Panoramic View of the Whole City of Gyeongseong. The companion film was created in order to provide supplementary footage for Righteous Revenge. Gyeongseong had shots of various places in Gyeongseong (the name of Seoul at the time), including scenes of Hangang Railway Bridge, Jangchungdan Park, and Seoul Station. Whether Gyeongseong can be considered the first ever film is disputed, as it did not have actors or a plot. It was not intended for significant independent screening, although audiences were still impressed by the film.

The South Korean government considers Righteous Revenge to be the first film.

== Legacy ==
The release of the kino-drama is now considered Korean Film Day.

For its 100th anniversary, a number of celebrations were held. On November 1, 2019, a recreation of the kino-drama was held at Gwanghwamun Plaza in Seoul. It was then shown in the Antonchekov Theater (안똔체홉극장) until December 29. A temporary exhibit about the kino-drama and the theater, created in collaboration with the owners of the former building of Dansungsa, was held at the Seoul Museum of History until the following March.
