= Nongjungjo =

1926 Korean film by Na Woon-gyu

- Na Woon-gyu in Nongjungjo (1926)
- Hangul: 농중조
- Hanja: 籠中鳥
- RR: Nongjungjo
- MR: Nongjungjo
- Directed by: Lee Kyu-seol
- Written by: Na Woon-gyu (as Shuichi Tsumori); Jin Soo (Japanese)
- Starring: Lee Kyu-sul; Bok Hae-sook; No Chap-ryong; Na Woon-gyu
- Distributed by: Joseon Kinema Productions
- Release date: 19 June 1926
- Country: Korea
- Language: Korean (Silent)

NongJungJo (Korean: 농중조), also known as Bird in Cage, is a 1926 Korean silent film. Future writing/directing/acting star Na Woon-gyu appeared in this film just before his breakthrough in Arirang (1926). Kato Kyohei served as director of photography both for this and other well-known Korean movies of the 1920s.

== Plot summary ==
The story is a melodrama concerning two lovers who are kept apart by the woman's strict parents, who lock her in her house.
