= Na Un'gyu =

Korean filmmaker and actor (1902–1937)

Na Woon-gyu
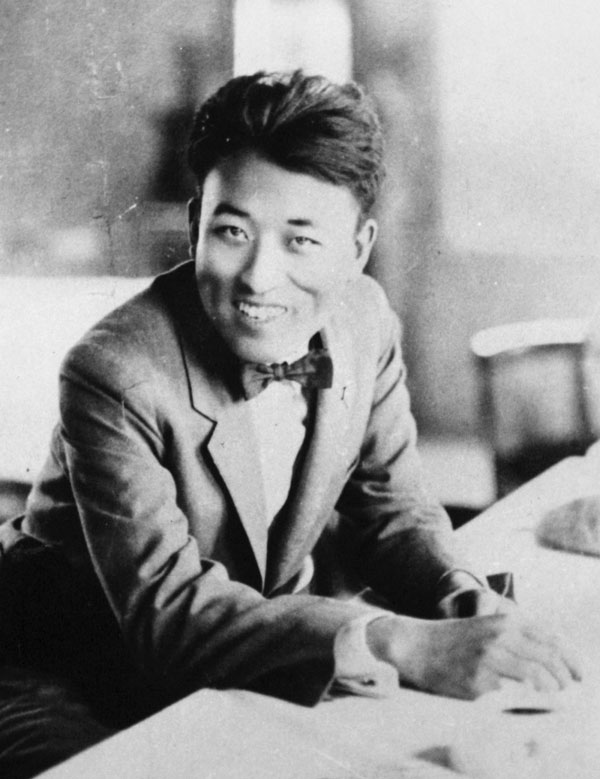
- Na photography
- Born: November 26, 1902; Hoeryong, North Hamgyong Province, Korean Empire
- Died: August 9, 1937 (aged 34); Keijō, Keiki-dō, Korea, Empire of Japan
- Occupations: Actor; screenwriter; director

Korean name
- Hangul: 나운규
- Hanja: 羅雲奎
- RR: Na Ungyu
- MR: Na Un'gyu

Art name
- Hangul: 춘사
- Hanja: 春史
- RR: Chunsa
- MR: Ch'unsa

Na Woon-gyu (Korean: 나운규; Hanja: 羅雲奎; October 27, 1902 – August 9, 1937) was a Korean actor, screenwriter and director. He is widely considered the most important filmmaker in early Korean cinema, and possibly Korea's first true movie star. Since he often wrote, directed and acted in his films, he has even been said to have started the auteur film-making tradition in Korea.

== Early life ==
Na Woon-gyu was the third son of Na Hyong-gwon, a military officer during the final days of the Joseon period who had returned to his hometown of Hoeryong, Hamgyongbuk-do to teach. As a high-school student, Na was involved in theater and acting, but also in anti-Japanese activities including the March 1, 1919 protest against the occupation. To avoid imprisonment, he spent two years crossing and re-crossing the Duman River, which separates Korea from Manchuria. He traveled as far as Siberia, joining with Korean Liberation fighters in anti-occupation work.

In 1921, he returned to Seoul, and enrolled in Yonhui (now Yonsei) University to study social science. It was at this period that his fascination with the cinema began. He would fill notebooks with jottings while watching films in theaters, and would carry a hand mirror with him wherever he went to practice facial expressions.

However, like the main character in his first, and most famous film, Arirang, he was caught by the Japanese and jailed for his participation in the March First Movement. While in prison in Chongjin, from 1921 until 1923, Na received his artistic pen-name, Chunsa, from Lee Chun-song, another resistance fighter. When he was released in 1923, he joined the Yerimhoe Play Troupe in his hometown, Hoeryong.

After leaving the troupe, he sold all of his books to buy a train ticket to Busan, where he applied for a job acting at the Choson Film Company. He started playing extras and then villains in films for this company. His debut was in the 1925 film UnYeongJeon.

== Film career ==
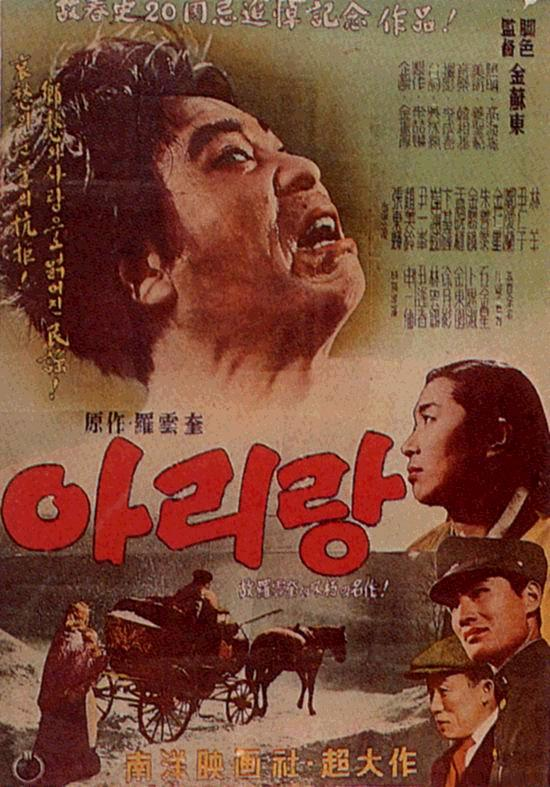
The re-vamped poster of Arirang from 1957

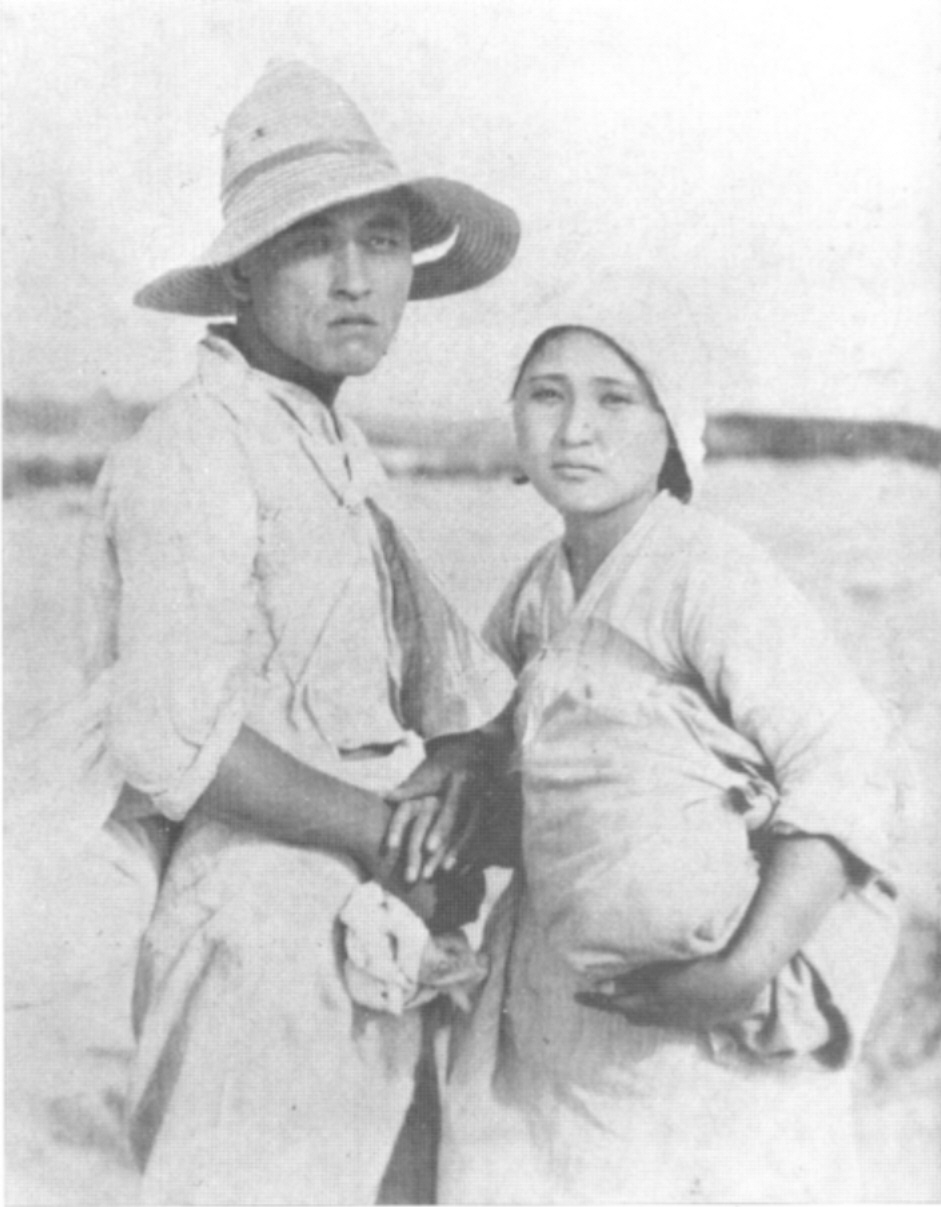
Na Woon-gyu (left) in the film Imjaeobtneun naleutbae.

Though Na Woon-gyu has been described as short, and with a toad-like face which suited him for the peasant roles he often played, the anger and frustration he was able to project on the screen suited the situation and mood of the Korean people at the time. Na first came to public attention in the role of the father of the title character in Lee Kyong-son's 1925 film, Simchong-jon (The Story of Shim Chong).

His first film as writer/director/star, Arirang (1926), was a national sensation in Korea. Films in Korea underwent censorship and restrictions by the Japanese authorities. Scripts had to be submitted to, and approved by the occupying Japanese government before they could be produced and distributed. Criticism of the government was censored, leading most films to be in the melodramatic, sentimental style known as shinpa. Na's innovation in Arirang was finding a way to express Korean opposition to the Japanese occupation metaphorically by unifying the shinpa style with a spirit of nationalism. He thereby made cinema in Korea no longer mere entertainment, but a vehicle for an expression of national resistance to the Japanese occupation.

Financed by Park Sung-pil, owner of Dansongsa Theater, Na founded Na Woon-kyu Productions in September 1927 and opened his production company in Changsin-dong, near Dongdaemun. In contrast to the Japanese-run studios, the company's goal was to produce films by Koreans, for Koreans.

Na's 1929 Salangeul chajaseo was an epic film employing more than a thousand extras. As with Arirang, a period of Na's own life could be seen as an inspiration for the story. It dealt with Koreans crossing the Duman River, as Na himself had done, in search of freedom from Japanese oppression. The film was banned at first, but was finally released, though in a heavily revised and edited form. The failure of Beongeoli Sam-ryong (1929) soon forced the closure of Na's studio.

Arirang had initiated the period of nationalist film in Korea which continued from 1926 until about 1930, when harsher suppressive measures were undertaken by the authorities. After Arirang, tear-jerker shinpa-style movies that did no more than entertain, without appealing to a deeper national need, were criticized by the Korean press. Indeed, some of Na's own later films were also criticized in this way. Korean director and film historian Yu Hyun-mok states that Na's appearance with a Japanese woman as his romantic interest in the 1931 shinpa film, Geumganghan (The Grief of Geumgan), was seen as a betrayal by the Korean people, and had a profoundly negative impact on his career.

Due to the time he spent in prison and the torture he underwent there, Na suffered from poor health throughout his life. He died at the age of 34 (or 36 by Korean counting) of tuberculosis in 1937. Short though his career was, he was the most prolific filmmaker of the era known as the "Golden Age of Silent Films" in Korea. In a period of about ten years he acted in twenty-six movies, and directed fifteen.

== Legacy ==
Allegations of working with the Japanese do not seem to have harmed Na's reputation as one of the founders of Korean cinema either in his own time or in the following decades. Na's funeral procession was led by a band playing Arirang, and was attended by mourning crowds in spite of the rain. The newspaper Chosun Ilbo's November 1938 audience poll for the best silent Korean films put Arirang in the number one spot. Two other films by Na Woon-gyu were also on the top ten list: Sarangul Chajaso (Looking for Love), and Punguna (The Man with Great Ambition) (1926). Na's last film, Omongnyo (1937) was second on the list of best sound films made in Korea.

His life was the subject of the 1966 film, Na Woon-Gyui ilsaeng, which was directed by and starred Choi Mu-ryong, father of current star Choi Min-soo. The Korea Film Directors' Society paid tribute to Na Woon-gyu, by taking his pen name for their Chunsa Art Film Festival, begun in 1990.

A location near "Arirang Hill" in Seoul was refashioned into a "Street of Motion Pictures," housing the Arirang Cine Center, Arirang Information Library, a small theme park claiming to be the movie set, a monument in memory of the 100th anniversary of Na Woon-gyu's birth, and an annual film festival.

He was an influence of Shin Sang-ok.

His story is fictionalized in the book Same Bed Different Dreams by Ed Park.

== Filmography ==
- UnYeongJeon (운영전) (1925) (Acting debut)
- Simchong-jon (심청전) (The Story of Shim Chong) (1925) (Actor)
- JangHanMong (장한몽) (1926) (Actor)
- Nongjungjo (농중조) (1926) (Actor)
- Arirang (아리랑) (1926) (Director, writer, actor)
- Punguna (풍운아) (Soldier of Fortune) (1926) (Director, writer, actor, editor)
- Deuljwi (들쥐) (The Wild Rat) (1927) (Director, writer, actor, editor)
- Heukkwa Baek (흑과백) (Black and White) (1927)
- Geumbungeo (금붕어) (Goldfish) (1927) (Director, actor, editor)
- Jalitgeola (잘 있거라) (Farewell) (1927) (Director, producer, writer, actor, editor)
- Ok-nyeo (1928) (옥녀) (Director, producer, writer, editor)
- Beongeoli Sam-ryong (벙어리 삼룡) (Deaf Sam-ryong) (1929) (Director, producer, writer, actor)
- Salangeul chajaseo (사랑을 찾아서) (In Search of Love) (1929) (Director, producer, writer, actor, editor)
- Sanai (사나이) (1929)
- Arirang geuhu iyagi (아리랑 그 후 이야기) or Arirang hu pyeon (아리랑 후편) (Arirang 2) (1930) (Writer, actor)
- Cheolindo (철인도) (1930) (Director, writer, actor, editor)
- Geumganghan (금강한) (The Grief of Geumgan) (1931) (Director, actor)
- Nampyeuneun Kyeongbidaero (남편은 경비대로) (1931)
- Gaehwadang imun (개화당 이문) (1932) (Director, writer, actor, editor)
- Imjaeobtneun naleutbae (임자없는 나룻배) (The Ownerless Ferryboat) (1932) (Actor)
- Amgunwang (암굴왕) (1932)
- Jongno (종로) (1933)
- Muhwagwa (무화과) (Fig Tree) (1935) (Director, editor)
- Kanggeonneo maeul (강 건너 마을) (Town Across the River) (1935) (Director, writer, editor)
- Geulimja (그림자) (Shadow) (1935) (Director, writer, actor)
- Hwangmuji (황무지) (1935)
- Arirang 3 (아리랑 제3편) (1936) (Director, writer, actor)
- Chilbeontong sosageon (칠번통 소사건) (Incident of the 7th Bamboo Flute) (1936) (Director, writer, actor, editor)
- Oh Mong-nyeo (오몽녀) (1937) (Director)

== Sources ==
- Han, Man-Yong (1983). Korean Dance Theater and Cinema. Si Sa Yong O Sa Pub. ISBN 0-89209-017-0.
- James, David E.; Kyung Hyun Kim, eds. (2002). Im Kwon-Taek; The Making of a Korean National Cinema. Detroit: Wayne State University Press. ISBN 0-8143-2869-5.
- Kim Hyun-kyung (2004). The Remasculinization of Korean Cinema. Durham and London: Duke University Press. ISBN 0-8223-3267-1.
- Kim Kab-ui (2001). 춘사나운규전집: 그생애와예술 [The works of Chunsa Na Woon-gyu: his life and art]. Seoul: Chimmundang. ISBN 89-303-0877-5. OCLC 48685673.
- Kim, Sarah Sun (2001). (original, dead link)
- Yŏng-il Yi; Young-chol Choe (1988). Yŏnghwa Chinhŭng Kongsa (Korea) (ed.). The History of Korean Cinema. Translated by Richard Lynn Greever. Seoul: Motion Picture Promotion Corporation. ISBN 89-88095-12-X.
- Min Eung-jun; et al. (2003). The History of Korean Cinema. Westport, Connecticut: Praeger. ISBN 0-275-95811-6.
- Noh Kwang Woo. Formation of Korean Film Industry under Japanese Occupation
