= Umigwan =

1910–1982 movie theater in South Korea

General information
- Town or city: Seoul
- Country: South Korea
- Coordinates: 37.5698°N 126.9867°E
- Opened: 1910 or 1911
- Closed: 1982

Umigwan (Korean: 우미관; Hanja: 優美館) was a historic movie theater in Gwancheol-dong, Jongno District, Seoul, South Korea. It was established in 1910 or 1911 by a Japanese person, initially under the name Golden Entertainment Hall (고등연예관; 黃金演藝館). It received the Umigwan name in December 1912. It was a large two-story brick building with a seating capacity of 1,000.

The theater saw its heyday in the 1910s, before its competitors the Chosŏn Theater and Dansungsa became more established. It showed a significant number of silent short films in its first decade. It showed the first sound film in Korea in 1928.

Its influence waned over time, although it remained in operation for even after the end of the Japanese colonial period in 1945. It was eventually destroyed during the 1950–1953 Korean War.

The theater was reconstructed in 1959, next to the Whashin Department Store. The theater never regained its prestige, and eventually went out of business in 1982.
