= Dansungsa =

1907–2010 movie theater in Seoul

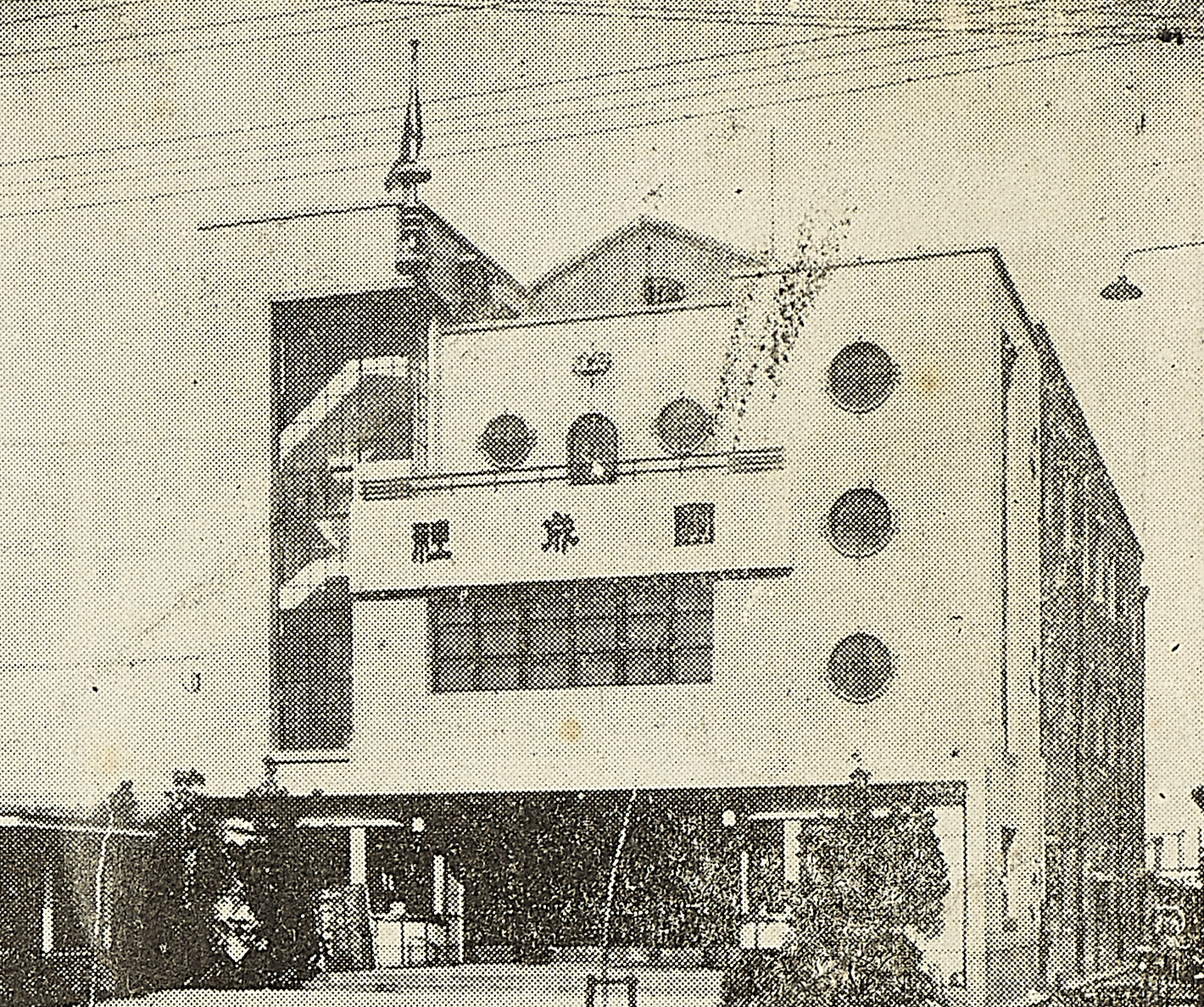
- The building c. 1937

General information
- Location: Donhwamunro26 Jongno District, Seoul, South Korea
- Coordinates: 37°34′15.36″N 126°59′32.66″E
- Opened: 1907
- Closed: 2010

Korean name
- Hangul: 단성사
- Hanja: 團成社
- RR: Danseongsa
- MR: Tansŏngsa

Dansungsa (Korean: 단성사) was one of Korea's earliest and most historic movie theaters. It was first established in 1907, during the Korean Empire period, in what is now Jongno 3-ga in Seoul. It was once widely believed to be the oldest movie theater in Korea, but in recent years, that title is now thought to belong to Ae Kwan Theater, which was founded in Incheon in 1895.

The theater held a position of prominence in Korean society for many decades. However, by the 1980s, it saw declining popularity and increasing competition. After the rise of multiplex movie theaters in the 1990s, the theater made an attempt to convert into one itself. It reopened in 2008 as a multiplex, but failed to recoup on its investments and went bankrupt soon afterwards. In 2010, the building was converted into a regular office building that now sells jewelry. In 2019, a museum dedicated to the theater was opened in the building.

== History ==
Dansungsa was first built as a single screen, two-story wooden building in 1907, during the Korean Empire period. It was located in what is now the Jongno 3-ga area of Seoul.

On October 27, 1919, the movie hosted its first premiere: a kino-drama considered the first ever Korean movie, Righteous Revenge. Na Woon-gyu's Korean folk movie, Arirang, followed, premiering in the theatre in 1926. Chunhyanjeon became the theatre's third premier in 1935.

Dansungsa held a position of prestige in the Korean cinema world for decades afterwards, and was considered a significant place for the first screenings of movies. Long lines and ticket scalpers were once common for the theater.

In 1963, the South Korean government declared October 27, the same day that Righteous Revenge premiered at Dansungsa, to be Korea Film Day. The declaration celebrated both the Korean film industry and the movie theaters Dansungsa, Umikwan, and Chosun Theater, which were the only theatres showing Korean movies during the period of Japanese colonial rule.

In 1993, the film Seopyeonje, the first South Korean film to draw over one million viewers, premiered in the theater.

=== Decline and closure ===
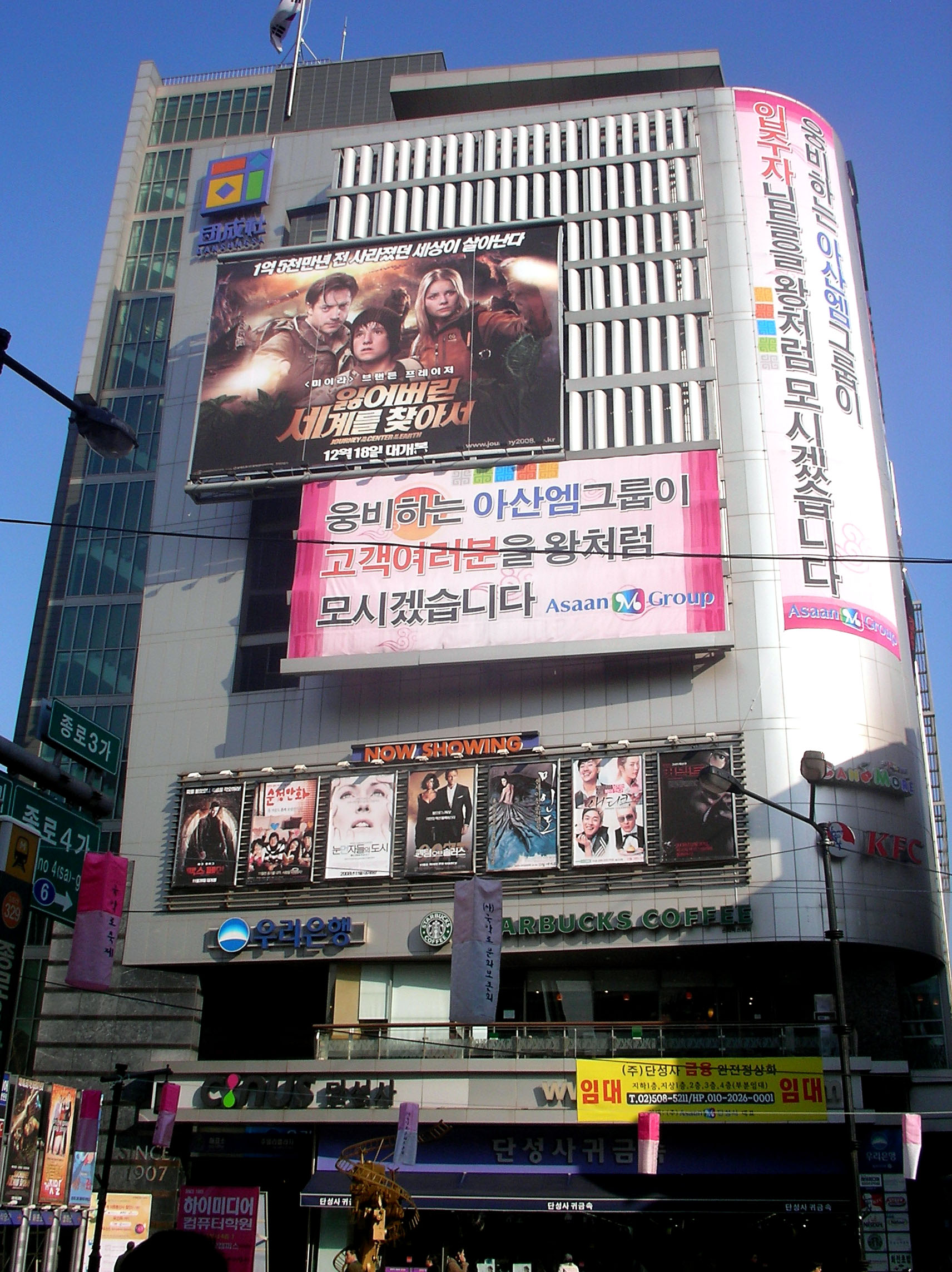
The building on November 30, 2008, several months after the bankruptcy was announced.

But by the 1990s, the rise of the multiplex theater led to a steep decline in revenues. The theater renovated from 2001 to 2005 into a multiplex with ten screens and a seating capacity of 1,802, but this did not halt the decline. In 2005 it reopened under a partnership with Cinus as Cinus Dansungsa. However, it failed to make a return on the renovation investment, and saw a record 11 billion won in losses in 2007. The company failed to pay back a 1.5 billion won ($1.3 million) loan to Woori Bank in 2008, and went bankrupt. It was announced in 2008 that it would continue screening films until 2010, after which it would be converted into a regular office building. The building eventually converted in 2010. The building now sells jewelry.

In 2019, it was announced that the Young An Hat Co., the owner of the building, would open a museum dedicated to Dansungsa in the building, to coincide with the 100th anniversary of the Korean film industry. The museum opened on October 23 of that year.

== Gallery ==
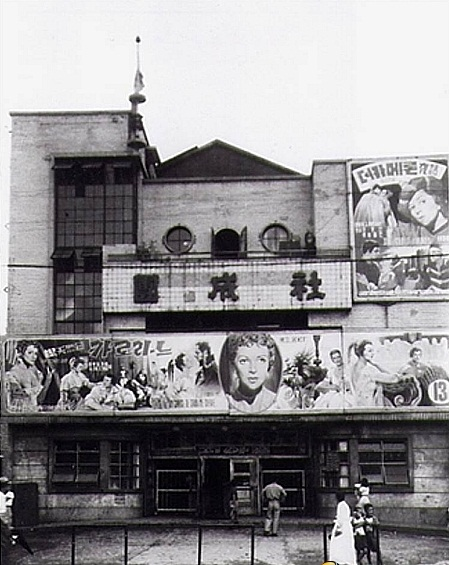
The theater in 1953

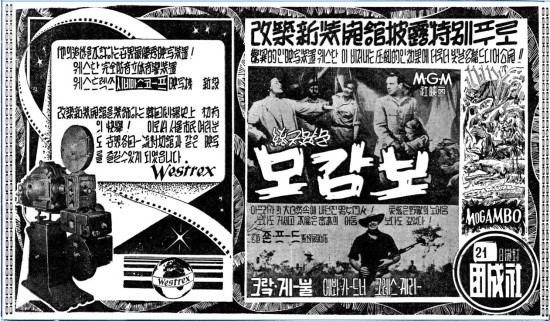
A flyer from the theater advertising the screening of the 1953 American film Mogambo.

The building in 2023, after the film museum was established in the basement. It still mainly sells jewelry.

== See also ==
- Movie theaters in South Korea
- Cinema of Korea
- Korea under Japanese rule
