= Cinema of Korea =

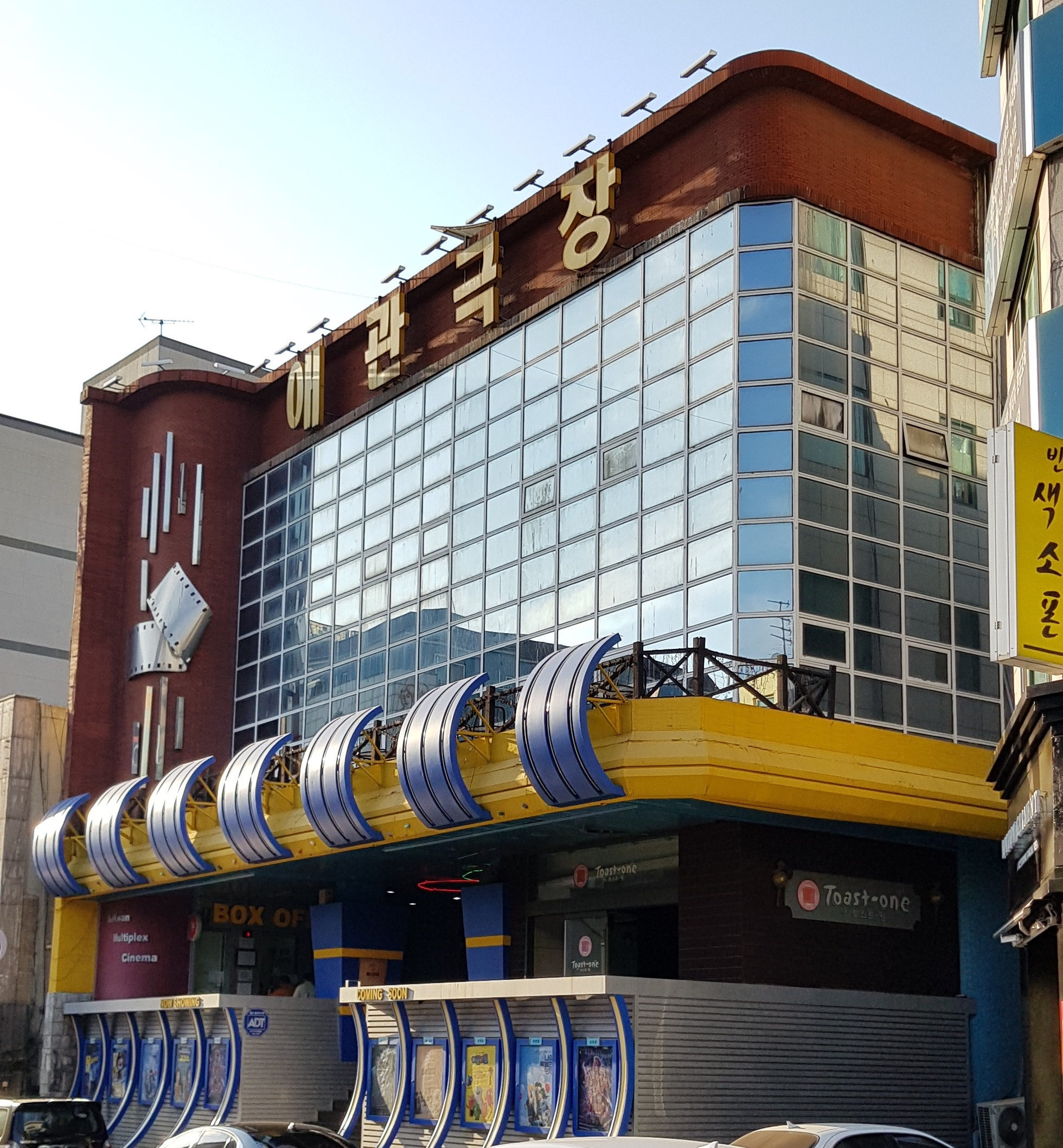
Ae Kwan Theater in Incheon, South Korea

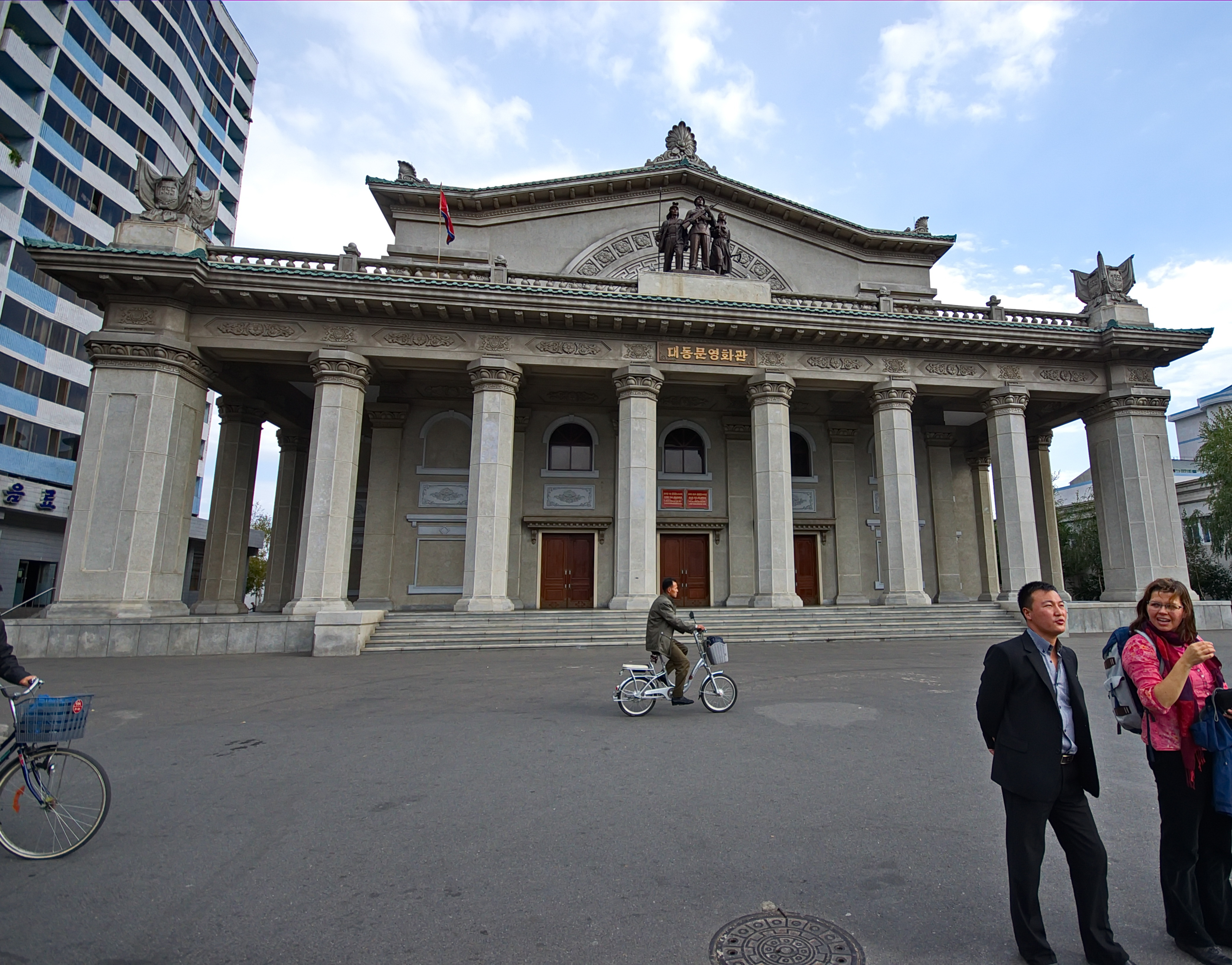
Taedongmoon Cinema in Pyongyang, North Korea

The cinema of Korea encompasses the film industries of North Korea and South Korea, as well as the historical film industries of the Korean Empire and Korea during the Japanese occupation. While both countries have relatively robust film industries today, only South Korean films have achieved wide international acclaim. North Korean films typically portray Juche ideology or revolutionary themes.

South Korean films enjoyed a "golden age" during the late 1950s and 1960s, but by the 1970s had become generally considered to be of low quality. Nonetheless, by 2005 South Korea became a nation that watched more domestic than imported films in theatres. This was partially a result of laws placing limits on the number of foreign films able to be shown per theatre per year. It has been noted that Korean movies have consistently outperformed foreign films with very few exceptions in the Korean box office.

== Early period ==
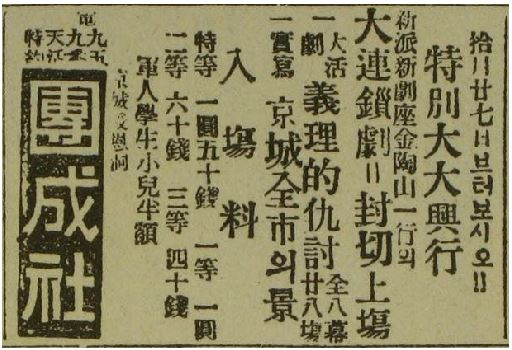
A 1919 advertisement for the kino-drama Righteous Revenge, which is sometimes considered to be the first Korean film

American traveler and lecturer Burton Holmes was the first to film in Korea as part of his travelogue programs. In addition to displaying his films abroad, he showed them to the Korean royal family in 1899.

Korea's first film studio, Dongdaemun Motion Picture Studio, was opened in 1903. There are several competing claims for which is the first movie theater in the country. Dansungsa, which opened in Seoul in November 1907, is widely considered the first theater. However, a 2021 article in The Hankyoreh claims that the Incheon-based Ae Kwan Theater, which first opened as Hyŏmnyulsa (협률사; 協律舍) in 1895, is the first.

Righteous Revenge, a 1919 kino-drama (stageplay with a film backdrop) is widely considered the first Korean film, although this label is disputed. It premiered at Dansungsa, on the same day and just after the premiere of the companion documentary film Panoramic View of the Whole City of Gyeongseong. The anniversary of its release is celebrated as Korean Film Day in South Korea.

For the next few years, film production in Korea consisted of kino-dramas and documentaries. As with the first showing of a film in Korea, the first feature film produced in Korea also appears to be unclear. Some name a filming of Chunhyang-Jeon (춘향전) in 1921 (released in 1922) as the first Korean feature film. The traditional story, Chunhyang, was to become Korea's most-filmed story later. It was possibly the first Korean feature film, and was certainly the first Korean sound film, color film and widescreen film. Im Kwon-taek's 2000 pansori version of Chunhyang brought the number of films based on Chunyang to 14. Other sources, however, name Yun Baek-nam's Ulha ui Mengse ("Plighted Love Under the Moon"), released in April, 1923, as the first Korean feature film.

In 1925, the German priest Norbert Weber captured footage of Korea in order to document Korean culture in case it was wiped out by Japanese colonization. He then returned to Bavaria and edited the footage into a feature-length documentary, Im Lande der Morgenstille (lit. 'In the Land of Morning Calm'), as well as five other short films. The documentary aired until the 1930s in Germany and Austria and was largely forgotten about until it was rediscovered in the late 1970s by South Korean researchers. The film has since been digitized and is now available for free online.

== The golden era of silent films (1926–1930) ==
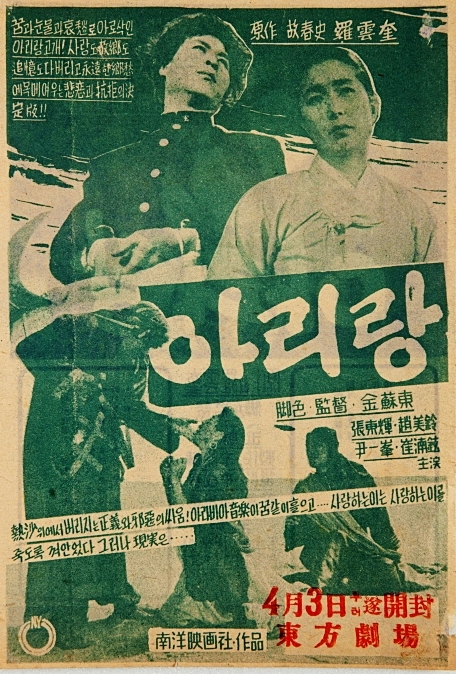
A film poster for Arirang

Korean film studios at this time were Japanese-operated. A hat-merchant known as Yodo Orajo established a film company called Choson Kinema Productions. After appearing in the Choson Kinema's 1926 production Nongjungjo, the young actor Na Woon-gyu got the chance to write, direct and star in his own film. The release of Na's film, Arirang (1926) is the start of the era of silent film in Korea. Hidden or subtle messages could be magnified through the common use of a live narrator at the theater, a tradition known as byeonsa (benshi in Japanese). The tradition of byeonsa was imported from Japan and provided an economical and entertaining alternative to translating intertitles. When Japanese authorities were not present, the narrators could inject satire and criticism of the occupation into the film narrative, giving the film a political subtext invisible to Japanese government censors. The byeonsa operated as "a narrator that introduces the characters and the setting, and explains the physical actions and psychological dilemmas during silent film screenings." The byeonsa also functioned "as a cultural intermediary during the Korean audience's film-viewing experience, and utilized his narration to complement censorship or technological limitations during the silent film period." Some of the more popular byeonsa were better-paid than the film actors.

The success of Arirang inspired a burst of activity in the Korean film industry in the late 1920s, causing this period to become known as "The Golden Era of Silent Films". More than seventy films were produced at this time, and the quality of film improved as well as the quantity.

Another important director of this period, Shim Hun, directed only one film, Mondongi Tultte (먼동이 틀 때; At Daybreak). Though the reviews for this film were as strong as those for Arirang, Shim died at the age of 35 while directing his second film, based on his own novel, Sangroksu (상록수; The Evergreens).

== The later silent era (1930–1935) ==
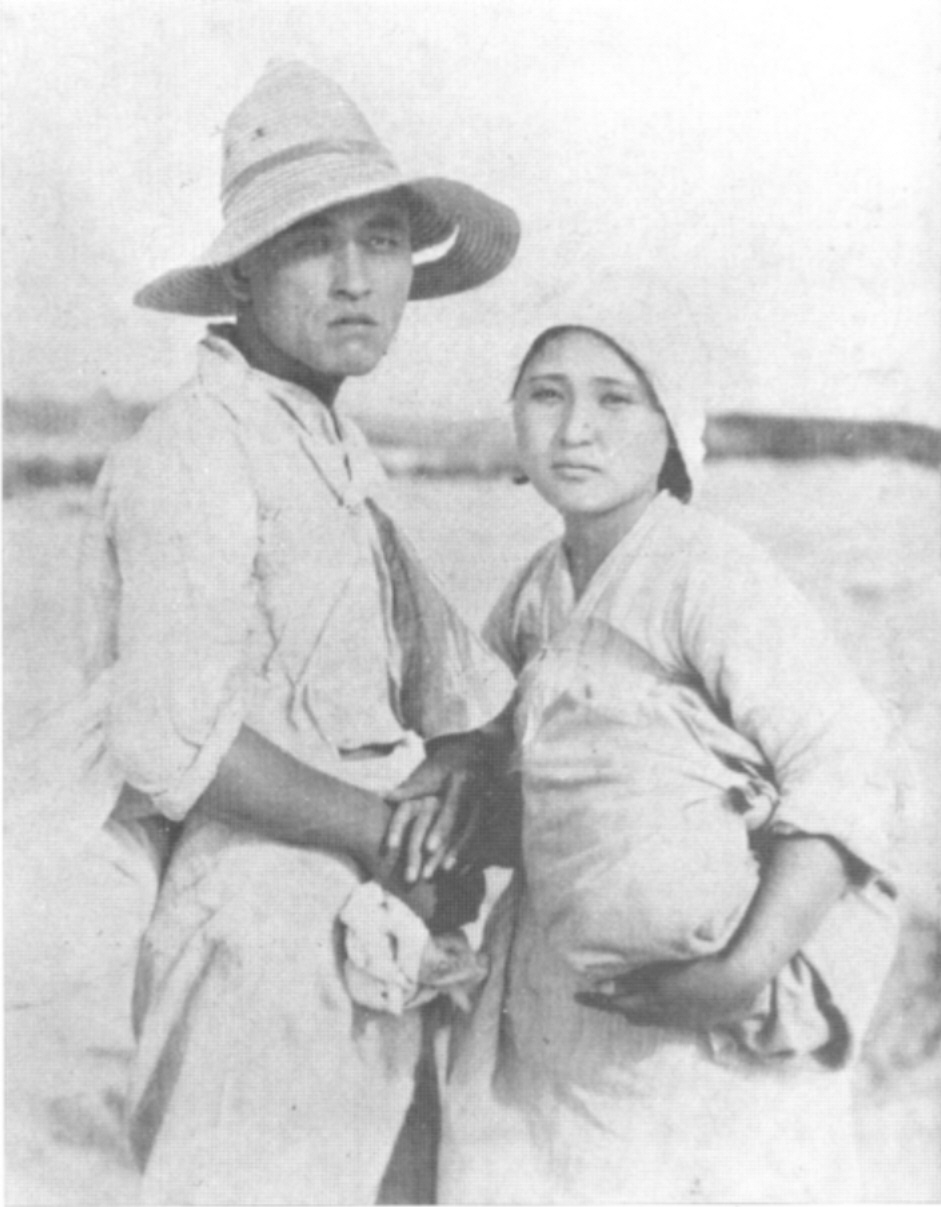
Na Woon-gyu and Moon Ye-bong in A Ferry Boat That Has No Owner

The first half of the 1930s saw a decline in the domestic film industry in Korea. Censorship and oppression on the part of the occupying authorities played a part in reducing the number of films produced at this time to only two or three per year, and some filmmakers fled Korea for the more robust film-industry in Shanghai at this time.

Imported films largely replaced domestic films, although with Korean General Law No. 40 of 1933, the Japanese mandated that all foreign films distributed in Korea should be imported through Japan. Some of the films from Japan were popular, but the film reels were often so heavily used that the image was of low quality. Narrators could nevertheless make even worn-out movies interesting to audiences.

Perhaps the most important film of this era was A Ferry Boat That Has No Owner (1932), directed by Lee Gyu-hwan (1904–1981) and starring Na Woon-gyu. Increasing governmental censorship meant that commentators have called this the last pre-liberation film to present a significant nationalistic message.

== Early sound era (1935–1945) ==
Korea's first sound film was Lee Myeong-woo's 1935 Chunhyang-jeon.

Korea was one of Japan's first and most important centers of colonial film production. Japanese-sponsored shorts, newsreels, and feature films heavily promoted cultural assimilation to colonized Korean audiences. To this end the Korean Colonial Cinema Unit (朝鮮総督府キネマ) was established to produce and distribute a mixture of films that promoted Japanese culture and customs as well as the supposed benefits of modernization under the Japanese.

Sound films in Korea faced much harsher censorship from the Japanese government than previous silent films. The loss of the byeonsa narrators with the coming of sound film meant that anti-authority messages could no longer be inserted without the knowledge of censors. Japanese film censors replaced American and European films with Japanese films as part of the larger colonial project to culturally colonize Korea. Suicide Troops of the Watchtower (望楼の決死隊, 1943) was one of several propaganda features that promoted the Japanese colonial notion of naisen ittai or "Japan and Korea as one body."

Although Japanese film production in Korea began in the early 1930s, total mobilization and consolidation of the Korean film industry under the Japanese would not begin until after Japan's full-scale invasion of China in 1937. Film was an important way by which the Japanese maintained colonial control in Korea through the promotion of assimilationist policies. For example, in 1941 Japan's Shochiku Studios together with the Japanese-sponsored Korean Military Information Division co-produced the film You and I (君と僕). The film was directed by Hae Yeong, a Korean who had worked extensively in the Japanese film industry using the name "Hinatsu Eitaro". You and I promoted the "volunteer" enlistment of Koreans into the imperial Japanese Army and carried as a subplot the interracial marriage between a Japanese woman and a Korean man. After the film was completed, Hae went to Java in Indonesia where he continued to make documentaries for the Japanese. After the war, he changed his name to Dr. Huyung, married an Indonesian woman with whom he had two sons, and produced three important Indonesian films. Before his death in 1952, he told a close friend, "If I returned to Japan now there wouldn't be any jobs for me and if I returned to Korea, I'd most likely be branded a Japanese collaborator."

== Cinema of South Korea ==
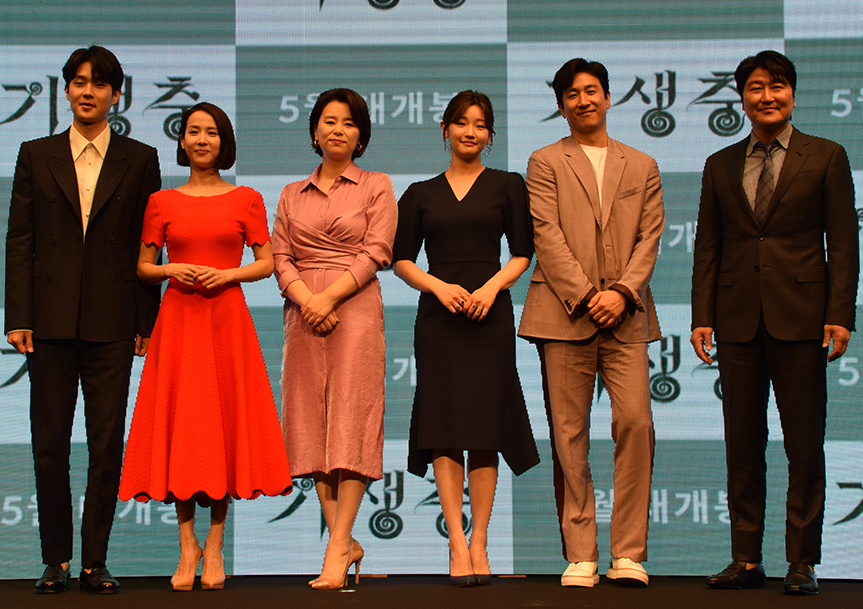
The cast of Parasite, which won four Academy Awards and became the first non-English language film to win the Academy Award for Best Picture

The golden age of South Korean cinema in the mid-20th century produced what are considered two of the best South Korean films of all time, The Housemaid (1960) and Obaltan (1961), while the industry's revival with the Korean New Wave from the late 1990s to the present produced both of the country's highest-grossing films, The Admiral: Roaring Currents (2014) and Extreme Job (2019), as well as prize winners on the festival circuit including Golden Lion recipient Pietà (2012) and Palme d'Or recipient and Academy Award winner Parasite (2019) and international cult classics including Oldboy (2003), Snowpiercer (2013), and Train to Busan (2016). Parasite won several awards at international film festivals, including four Academy Awards: Best Picture, Best Director, Best Original Screenplay, and Best International Feature Film, becoming the first non-English-language film to win the Academy Award for Best Picture. (Note: Although Parasite was the first film with a non-English script to win Best Picture at the Oscars, it is not to be confused with the first foreign film (produced by a company of a country that does not have English as its primary language) to win Best Picture, which was achieved by The Artist in 2012. The French-produced film was largely silent with French intertitles and contained a few spoken lines in English. The Academy dictates foreign language as the main qualification for international film, hence The Artist did not qualify. Further, while prior winners The Last Emperor and Slumdog Millionaire include significant amounts of non-English dialogue, they were considered products of the Hollywood system.)

South Korean cinema saw domestic box-office success exceeding that of Hollywood films in the late 1990s largely due to screen quota laws that limited the public showing foreign films. First enacted in 1967, South Korea's screen quota placed restrictions on the number of days per year that foreign films could be shown at any given theater—garnering criticism from film distributors outside South Korea as unfair. As a prerequisite for negotiations with the United States for a free-trade agreement, the Korean government cut its annual screen quota for domestic films from 146 days to 73 (allowing more foreign films to enter the market). In February 2006, South Korean movie workers responded to the reduction by staging mass rallies in protest. According to Kim Hyun, "South Korea's movie industry, like that of most countries, is grossly overshadowed by Hollywood. The nation exported US$2 million-worth of movies to the United States last year [2005] and imported $35.9 million-worth".

Director Park Chan-wook is widely regarded as a leading figure in South Korean and 21st-century world cinema. His 2003 action-thriller film Oldboy is regarded as one of the greatest films of all time and has been included in numerous "best-of" lists by many publications. In 2008, Oldboy was placed 64th on an Empire list of the top 500 movies of all time. In 2020, The Guardian ranked it number 3 among the classics of modern South Korean cinema.

== Cinema of North Korea ==
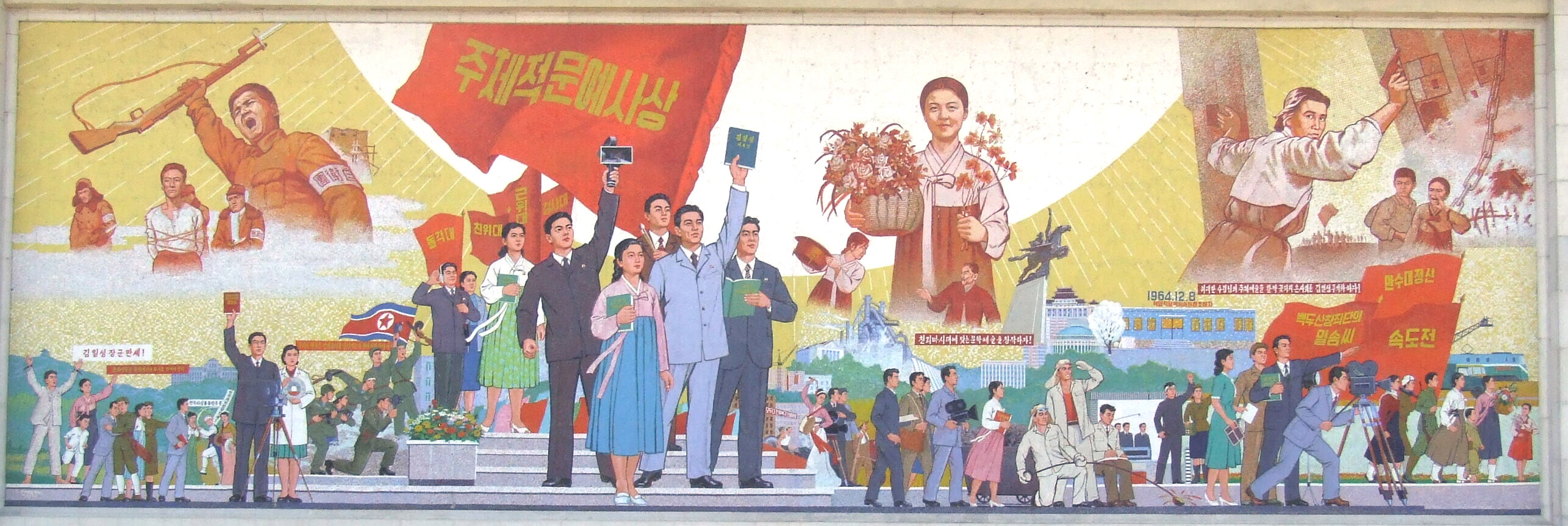
A mural dedicated to the art of filmmaking at the Korean Art Film Studio in Pyongyang

The first film to be produced in North Korea was Our Construction, a 1946 silent documentary film about the then-newly created socialist government of the country. The film industry of North Korea is sometimes known as "Chollywood", a portmanteau of "chollima" and "Hollywood". According to Koryo Tours, films are a popular and inexpensive pastime for North Koreans, and films play on televisions every day. The largest film studio in the country is the Korean Art Film Studio in Pyongyang, which has produced hundreds of films.

North Korean films typically feature propaganda themes, and The Flower Girl is one of the most popular films in the country. Foreign films are played at the biennial Pyongyang International Film Festival. Several North Korean films make use of American defectors as actors, especially to portray Western villains. Notable American actors in North Korean films include Charles Robert Jenkins, James Joseph Dresnok, Larry Allen Abshier, and Jerry Wayne Parrish. All four of them starred in the 20-part epic series Unsung Heroes.

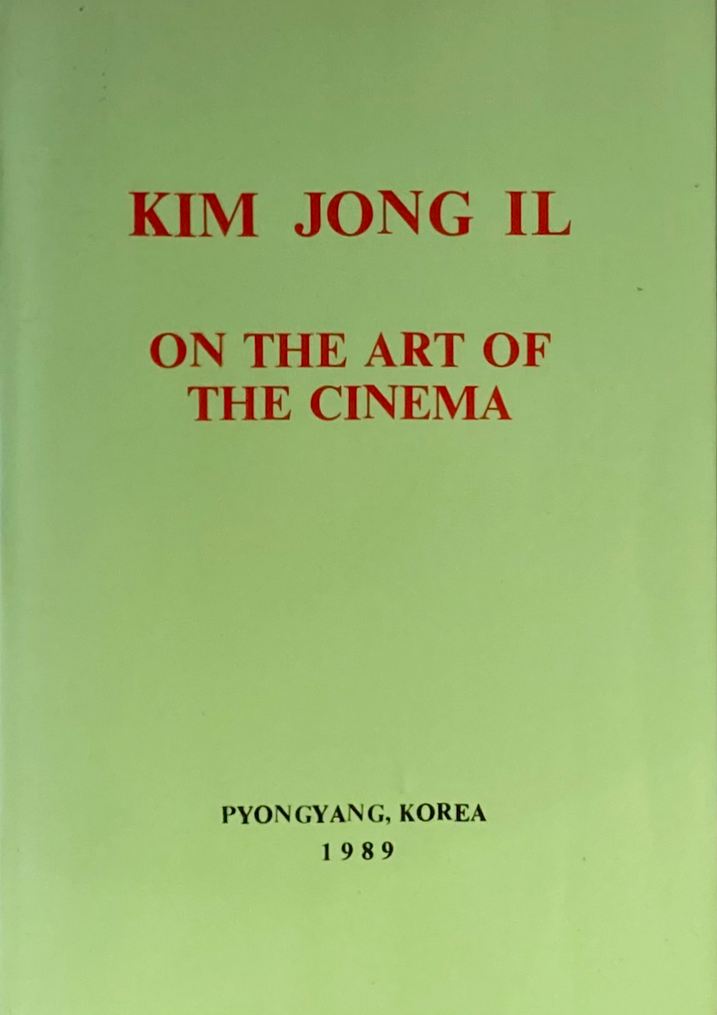
The cover page of the English-language edition of On the Art of the Cinema, Kim Jong Il's treatise on filmmaking

Kim Jong Il, the second Supreme Leader of North Korea, was an avid film buff. In 1973 he published the treatise On the Art of the Cinema, which details his views on filmmaking as both an art form and a tool of propaganda. The book deals comprehensively with aspects of cinema, including film and literary theory, acting, performance, score music, the screen, camerawork, costumes, make-up, and props. Of particular importance are themes of directing and producing as the driving forces of filmmaking. Ideas in the book are elucidated by drawing examples from North Korean films, of which Sea of Blood is the most referred one. On the Art of the Cinema presents two major theories: the theory of literature as "humanics" and the "seed theory". Both are considered justifications for the party's control over artistic creation. Other ideas developed by the treatise are the so-called "modeling theory" and "speed campaign". Compliance with these principles earns an artwork the title of "collective work".

In 1978, the North Korean government abducted the South Korean filmmaker Shin Sang-ok and his ex-wife, the actress Choi Eun-hee. While in North Korea, Shin Sang-ok and Choi Eun-hee were forced to create seven films, including, most famously, Pulgasari, a kaiju film heavily influenced by Japanese tokusatsu films such as the Godzilla franchise. The two escaped in 1986. The films produced by the two while in North Korea are considered to have been significant milestones in the history of Korean cinema, and Pulgasari later became the first North Korean film to be shown in South Korean theaters. Pulgasari has also become a cult classic outside of North Korea.

The 2005 animated film Empress Chung, directed by Nelson Shin, is a co-production of South and North Korea. In order to save costs, Shin collaborated with the North Korean SEK Studio because North Korean animators are paid less than South Korean animators. The film made use of 500 animators, 400 of which were North Korean. On August 12, 2005, Empress Chung became the first film to have been released simultaneously in both North and South Korea. It played in 6 theaters in North Korea and 51 theaters in South Korea. The film won a prize at the 2003 Annecy International Animation Film Festival and won the top prize at the 2004 Seoul International Cartoon and Animation Festival.

Since 2013, North Korea has had 4D film theaters.

== See also ==
- East Asian cinema
- List of Korean-language films
- List of Korean films of 1919–1948
- List of North Korean films
- List of South Korean films
- Korean animation
- Korean drama
- Korean horror
- Korean Wave
- Sageuk
- LGBTQ representation in South Korean film and television
