= List of Korean-language films =

This is a partial list of Korean-language films:

== 0-9 ==
- ...ing (2003)
- 3-Iron (2004)
- 6/45 (2022)
- The 8th Night (2021)
- 12.12: The Day (2023)
- 19-Nineteen (2009)
- 20th Century Girl (2022)
- 26 Years (2012)
- 100 Days with Mr. Arrogant (2004)
- 200 Pounds Beauty (2006)
- 301, 302 (1995)
- 2009: Lost Memories (2002)
- 2037 (2022)

== A ==
- A.F.R.I.K.A. (2002)
- A*P*E (1976)
- Aachi & Ssipak (2006)
- About Family (2024)
- Acacia (2003)
- Acoustic (2010)
- Ad-lib Night (2006)
- Adada (1987)
- Addicted (2002)
- Address Unknown (2001)
- Adultery (1989)
- Adultery Tree (1985)
- An Affair (1998)
- The Age of Success (1988)
- The Aggressives (2005)
- Air Murder (2022)
- Alienoid (2022)
- Alienoid: Return to the Future (2024)
- All About My Wife (2012)
- All for Love (2005)
- All That Falls Has Wings (1990)
- Almost Love (aka Youth Comic) (2006)
- Amazon Bullseye (2024)
- Anarchists (2000)
- Anchor (2022)
- Another Public Enemy (2005)
- Antique (2008)
- Antarctic Journal (2005)
- April Snow (2005)
- APT (2006)
- Arahan (2004)
- Arang (2006)
- Architecture 101 (2012)
- Ardor (2002)
- Arirang (1926)
- Arirang 3 (1936)
- Art Museum by the Zoo (1998)
- Art of Fighting (2006)
- The Art of Seduction (2005)
- As One (2012)
- Asako in Ruby Shoes (2000)
- Ashamed (2011)
- Asphalt (1964)
- Assassin (1969)
- The Assassin (2023)
- Assassination (2015)
- An Assault of Justice (1951)
- Attack the Gas Station (1999)
- Attack the Gas Station 2 (2010)
- Attack on the Pin-Up Boys (2007)
- The Attorney (2013)
- Au Revoir, UFO (2004)

== B ==
- BA:BO (2008)
- B-E-D (2013)
- Baby and I (2008)
- Bad Guy (2002)
- Bad Movie (1997)
- Badland Hunters (2024)
- Ballerina (2023)
- Ban Geum-ryeon (1982)
- Barefoot Ki-bong (2006)
- Barefooted Youth (1964)
- Barking Dogs Never Bite (2000)
- The Battleship Island (2017)
- Be a Wicked Woman (1990)
- The Beast and the Beauty (2005)
- Beasts of Prey (1985)
- Beat (1997)
- Beautiful (2008)
- Beautiful Sunday (2007)
- Beautiful Vampire (2018)
- Because I Hate Korea (2023)
- Believer (2018)
- Believer 2 (2023)
- Bet on My Disco (2002)
- A Better Tomorrow (2010)
- Between Love and Hate (2006)
- Bewitching Attraction (2006)
- Beyond the Mountain (1991)
- Beyond the Years (2007)
- Bichunmoo (2000)
- Big Deal (2025)
- The Big Swindle (2004)
- Birdcage Inn (1998)
- The Birth of Korea (2024)
- A Bittersweet Life (2005)
- A Bizarre Love Triangle (2002)
- Black House (2007)
- Black Republic (1990)
- Blind (2011)
- Blood and Bones (2004)
- Blood Rain (2005)
- Blood Relation (1963)
- The Blood Stained Route Map (2002)
- A Bloody Aria (2006)
- A Bloody Battle for Revenge (1992)
- Bloody Beach (2000)
- Bloody Tie (2006)
- Blue (2003)
- The Blue in You (1992)
- Blue Swallow (2005)
- Bogota: City of the Lost (2024
- A Bold Family (2005)
- Bongja (2000)
- The Book of Fish (2021)
- Born to Kill (1996)
- The Bow (2005)
- The Box (2021)
- Box of Death (1955)
- Boy Goes to Heaven (2005)
- Boy Meets Boy (2008)
- The Boys (2022)
- Brave Citizen (2023)
- Bravo, My Life (2005)
- Bravo My Life (2007)
- Break Out (2002)
- Breath (2007)
- Broker (2022)
- Bruce Lee Fights Back from the Grave (1976)
- Bulgasari (1962)
- Bun-rye's Story (1971)
- Bungee Jumping of Their Own (2001)
- Bunshinsaba (2004)
- Burning (film) (2018)
- By the Stream (2024)
- Bye June (1998)

== C ==
- Calla (1999)
- Camel(s) (2002)
- Carter (2022)
- The Case of Itaewon Homicide (2009)
- Cassiopeia (2022)
- Castaway on the Moon (2009)
- Cello (2005)
- Champion (2002)
- The Chaser (2008)
- Cheolindo (1930)
- Chi-hwa-seon (Strokes of Fire) (2002)
- The Childe (2023)
- Chilsu and Mansu (1988)
- Christmas Carol (2022)
- Christmas in August (1998)
- Chulsoo & Younghee (2005)
- Chunhyang (2000)
- Chunhyang-jeon (1955)
- Citizen of a Kind (2024)
- City of the Rising Sun (1999)
- The City of Violence (2006)
- The Classic (2003)
- The Client (2011)
- Clementine (2004)
- The Coachman (1961)
- The Coast Guard (2002)
- Cobweb (2023)
- Code Name: Jackal (2012)
- Cold Eyes (2013)
- Collectors (2020)
- Come Back Home (2022)
- Come Come Come Upward (1989)
- Come Unto Down (1982)
- Coming Out (2000)
- Coming Back (1967)
- Commitment (2013)
- A Company Man (2012)
- Concrete Utopia (2023)
- The Concubine (2012)
- Conduct Zero (2002)
- Confession (2022)
- Confession of Murder (2012)
- Confidential Assignment (2017)
- Confidential Assignment 2: International (2022)
- The Contact (1997)
- Count (2023)
- Cracked Eggs and Noodles (2005)
- Crazy First Love (2003)
- Crazy Waiting (2008)
- Crocodile (1996)
- Cruel Winter Blues (2006)
- Crush and Blush (2008)
- Crying Fist (2005)
- The Cursed: Dead Man's Prey (2021)
- The Customer Is Always Right 손님은 왕이다 (2006)
- The Cut (2007)

== D ==
- D-War (2007)
- Dachimawa Lee (2008)
- Daddy-Long-Legs (2005)
- Daisy (2006)
- Dance with the Wind (2004)
- Dancing Queen (2012)
- Daengbyeot (1985)
- Dead Man (2024)
- Defiance of a Teenager (1959)
- Dasepo Naughty Girls (2006)
- Daughters of Pharmacist Kim (1963)
- A Day(하루) (2001)
- The Day a Pig Fell Into the Well (1996)
- The Day I Died: Unclosed Case (2020)
- Dead Friend (2004)
- Deaf Sam-ryong (1929)
- Deaf Sam-yong (1964)
- Dear Dolphin (2013)
- Dear Jinri (2023)
- Dear Pyongyang (2006)
- Death Bell (2008)
- Death Bell 2: Bloody Camp (2010)
- Death Song (1991)
- Decibel (2022)
- Decision to Leave (2022)
- Deface (2007)
- Deranged (2012)
- Descendants of Cain (1968)
- Desire(갈망) (1968)
- Desire (2002)
- The Desperate Chase (2024)
- Detective K (2011)
- Detective Mr. Gong (2006)
- Deuljwi (The Wild Rat) (1927)
- The Devil's Deal (2021)
- The Devil's Game (2008)
- A Devilish Homicide (1965)
- Diary of June (2005)
- Diary of King Yeonsan (1987)
- Diary of Korean-Japanese War (1978)
- Diatron-5 (1985)
- Die Bad (2000)
- A Dirty Carnival (2006)
- Ditto (2000)
- Ditto (2022)
- The Divine Weapon (2008)
- DMZ(DMZ, 비무장지대) (2004)
- Do Re Mi Fa So La Ti Do (2008)
- Dog Days (2024)
- Doggy Poo (2003)
- Doll Master (2004)
- Dolphin (2023)
- Don't Buy the Seller (2023)
- Don't Click (2012)
- Don't Cry Mommy (2012)
- Don't Look Back(내 청춘에게 고함) (2006)
- Double Agent (2003)
- Downfall (1997)
- Dr. Cheon and Lost Talisman (2023)
- Dream (2008)
- Dream (2023)
- Drive (2023)
- Duelist (2005)

== E ==
- Elegy of Ren (1969)
- Emergency Act 19 (2002)
- Emergency Declaration (2021)
- Empress Chung (2005)
- Eoudong (1986)
- Epitaph (2007)
- Escape (2024)
- Escape from Mogadishu (2021)
- The Eternal Empire (1994)
- Even the Clouds are Drifting (1959)
- Everybody Has Secrets (2004)
- The Evil Stairs (1964)
- Evil Twin (2007)
- Exhuma (2024)
- Exit (2019)
- Exorcism Chronicles: The Beginning (2024)
- Extra Human Being (1964)
- Eye for an Eye (2008)
- Eyelids (2015)

== F ==
- Face (2004)
- Failan (2001)
- A Family (2004)
- Family Ties (2006)
- Farewell, My Darling (1996)
- Farewell to the Duman River (1962)
- Fate (2008)
- Feathers in the Wind (2005)
- Femme Fatale, Jang Hee-bin (1968)
- Festival (1996)
- Fighter in the Wind (2004)
- A Fine, Windy Day (1980)
- The Firefighters (2024)
- First Kiss (1998)
- First Snow (1958)
- Five Is Too Many (2005)
- Five Marines (1961)
- Five Senses of Eros (2009)
- Fists of Legend (2013)
- Flame (1975)
- Flame in the Valley (1967)
- Flight of the Bee (1998)
- A Flower in Hell (1958)
- Flower Island (2001)
- A Flower of Evil (1961)
- Fly, Daddy, Fly (2006)
- Fly High Run Far (1991)
- Flying Boys (2004)
- Following (2024)
- For Agnes (1991)
- For Eternal Hearts (2007)
- Forbidden Fairytale (2025)
- Forbidden Quest (2006)
- Forever the Moment (2008)
- The Foul King (2000)
- Four Toes (2002)
- The Fox Family (2006)
- The Fox with Nine Tails (1994)
- Free Woman (1982)
- Friend (2001)
- Frivolous Wife (2008)
- The Front Line (2011)
- A Frozen Flower (2008)

== G ==
- Gabi (2012)
- Gaehwadang imun (1932)
- Gangnam Zombie (2023)
- Gangster High (2006)
- Garden of Heaven (2003)
- The Genealogy (1979)
- The General in Red Robes (1973)
- General's Son (1990)
- General's Son II (1991)
- General's Son III (1992)
- Gentleman (2022)
- Geochilmaru (2005)
- Geumbungeo (Goldfish) (1927)
- Geumganghan (The Grief of Geumgan) (1931)
- Ghost House (2004)
- Ghost in Love (1999)
- Ghost Messenger (2010)
- Ghost Sweepers (2012)
- Ghost Train (2025)
- Gilsoddeum (1986)
- The Gingko Bed (1996)
- Girl by Girl (2006)
- The Girl on a Bulldozer (2022)
- Girl Scout (2008)
- Girls' Night Out (1998)
- Going by the Book (2007)
- Golden Iron Man (1968)
- A Good Day to Have an Affair (2007)
- A Good Lawyer's Wife (2003)
- A Good Rain Knows (2009)
- The Good, the Bad, the Weird (2008)
- Goryeojang (1963)
- Grain in Ear (2005)
- Le Grand Chef (2007)
- Le Grand Chef 2: Kimchi Battle (2010)
- The Grand Heist (2012)
- The Greatest Expectation (2003)
- Green Chair (2005)
- Green Fish (1997)
- The Guard Post (2008)
- Guests Who Arrived on the Last Train (1967)
- Guimoon: The Lightless Door (2021)
- Guns & Talks (2001)

== H ==
- H (2002)
- Haemoo (Sea Fog) (2014)
- Hammerboy (2004)
- Hanbando (2006)
- Handsome Guys (2024)
- Hansan: Rising Dragon (2022)
- Hansel and Gretel (2007)
- Happiness (2007)
- Happy End (1999)
- Happy Ero Christmas (2003)
- The Happy Life (2007)
- Harbin (2024)
- Hard Hit (2021)
- The Harmonium in My Memory (1999)
- Haunters (2010)
- He Was Cool (2004)
- Hear Me: Our Summer (2024)
- Heartbreak Library (2008)
- Heaven's Soldiers (2005)
- Hellcats (2008)
- Hello, Schoolgirl (2008)
- Helpless (2012)
- Henequen (1996)
- Herb (2007)
- Hero (2022)
- Hi, Dharma (2001)
- Hi-Five (2025)
- Hidden Face (2024)
- The Hidden Hero (1980)
- Hijack 1971 (2024)
- Hill of Freedom (2014)
- His Last Gift (2008)
- Hitman: Agent Jun (2020)
- Hitman 2 (2025)
- The Hole (1997)
- Holiday in Seoul (1997)
- Holy Daddy(also known as Wontak's Angel) (2006)
- Holy Night: Demon Hunters (2025)
- Hometown of the Heart (1949)
- Hommage (2021)
- Honest Candidate (2020)
- Honest Candidate 2 (2022)
- Honey Sweet (2023)
- Hopeless (2023)
- Horror Stories (2012)
- Horror Stories 2 (2013)
- Horror Stories 3 (2016)
- The Host (2006)
- Host & Guest (2006)
- Hostage: Missing Celebrity (2021)
- Hot Blooded (2022)
- The Housemaid (1960)
- The Housemaid (2010)
- The Houseguest and My Mother (1961)
- How the Lack of Love Affects Two Men (2006)
- How to Keep My Love (2004)
- How to Top My Wife (1994)
- How to Use Guys with Secret Tips (2013)
- Howling (2012)
- Humming (2008)
- Hunt (2022)
- Hunting of Fools (1984)
- Hwa-Om-Kyung (1993)
- Hwang Jin-yi (2007)
- Hypnotized (2004)
- Hyeong-Rae and the Hulk (1992)

== I ==
- I AM.: SM Town Live World Tour in Madison Square Garden (2012)
- I Am a King (2012)
- I Am Really Sorry (1976)
- I Came From Busan (2010)
- I, the Executioner (2024)
- I Want to Know Your Parents (2022)
- I Will Survive (1993)
- I Wish I Had a Wife (2001)
- I Would Rather Kill You (2025)
- I Saw the Devil (2010)
- I'm a Cyborg, But That's OK (2006)
- If the Sun Rises in the West (1998)
- If You Were Me (2003)
- If You Were Me 2 (2006)
- Il Mare (2000)
- Imjaeobtneun naleutbae (The Ownerless Ferryboat) (1932)
- In Another Country (2012)
- In Between Days (2007)
- In My End Is My Beginning (2013)
- In Our Prime (2022)
- In Water (2023)
- Incident of the 7th Bamboo Flute (1936)
- Innocent Steps (2005)
- In Search of Love (1928)
- Insect Woman (1972)
- Into the Mirror (2003)
- Invisible Light (2003)
- Invited People (1981)
- Iodo (1977)
- The Isle (2000)
- It's Okay! (2023)

== J ==
- Jail Breakers (2002)
- Jalitgeola (Farewell) (1927)
- Jangsa-ri 9.15 (2019)
- Janghwa Hongryeon Jeon (1924)
- Jealousy Is My Middle Name (2002)
- Jeni, Juno (2005)
- Jeon Woo-chi: The Taoist Wizard (2009)
- Joint Security Area (2000)
- Jongno (1933)
- Jung_E (2023)
- Jungle Juice (2003)
- Juror 8 (2019)

== K ==
- Kazoku Cinema (1998)
- Kick the Moon (2001)
- Kill Boksoon (2023)
- Kill the Love (1996)
- Killer Butterfly (1978)
- The Killer: A Girl Who Deserves to Die (2022)
- Killing Romance (2023)
- King and the Clown (2005)
- Kingmaker (2022)
- The Kites Flying in the Sky (2008)

== L ==
- Lady Daddy (2010)
- Lady Hong (1969)
- The Land (1974)
- Land of Happiness (2024)
- Last Present (2001)
- The Last Supper (2003)
- The Last Witness (1980)
- The Last Witness (2001)
- Late Autumn (1966)
- Late Spring (2014)
- Lee Dae-ro Can't Die (2005)
- The Legend of Gingko (2000)
- The Legend of Seven Cutter (2006)
- Legend of the Evil Lake (2003)
- Les Formidables (2006)
- The Letter (1997)
- The Long Way Home (2015)
- Libera Me (2000)
- Lies (1999)
- Life and Death of the Hollywood Kid (1994)
- Life Is Beautiful (2022)
- Life is Cool (2008)
- Like a Virgin (2006)
- Limit (2022)
- A Little Monk (2003)
- Lobby (2025)
- Loner (2008)
- Long and Winding Road (2005)
- Long Live the Island Frogs (1972)
- Looking for Bruce Lee (2002)
- Lost in Starlight (2025)
- A Love (2007)
- Love 911 (2012)
- Love and Leashes (2022)
- Love, In Between (2010)
- Love in Magic (2005)
- Love in the Big City (2024)
- Love is a Crazy Thing (2005)
- Love Me Not (2006)
- Love My Scent (2023)
- Love of Blood Relations (1976)
- Love Phobia (2006)
- Love Reset (2023)
- Love, So Divine (2004)
- Love Talk (2005)
- Love Wind Love Song (1999)
- Lovely Rivals (2004)
- Lover (2005)
- Lovers' Concerto (2002)
- Lovers Vanished (2010)
- The Lovers of Woomook-baemi (1990)
- Lovers in Woomuk-Baemi (1990)
- Low Life (2004)
- Lump Sugar (2006)

== M ==
- M (2007)
- Madame Aema (1982)
- Madame Aema 2 (1984)
- Madame Aema 3 (1985)
- Madame Aema 4 (1990)
- Madame Aema 5 (1991)
- Madame Aema 6 (1992)
- Madame Aema 7 (1992)
- Madame Aema 8 (1993)
- Madame Aema 9 (1993)
- Madame Aema 10 (1994)
- Madame Aema 11 (1995)
- Madame Freedom (1956)
- Madeleine (2003)
- Mai Ratima (2012)
- The Maidroid (2015)
- Make It Big (2002)
- The Man From Nowhere (2010)
- A Man of Reason (2022)
- The Man with Three Coffins (1987)
- A Man Who Was Superman (2008)
- Mandala (1981)
- Mapado (2005)
- Mapado 2: Back to the Island (2007)
- Marathon (2005)
- Marine Boy (2009)
- The Marines Who Never Returned (1963)
- Market (1965)
- Marriage Blue (2013)
- Marriage Is a Crazy Thing (2002)
- Marriage Story (1992)
- Marrying the Mafia (2002)
- Marrying the Mafia II (2005)
- Marrying the Mafia III (2006)
- Marrying the Mafia IV (2011)
- Masquerade (2012)
- The Match (2025)
- Maundy Thursday (2006)
- May 18 (2007)
- Mayumi (1990)
- The Medium (2021)
- Memento Mori (1999)
- The Memorial Gate for Virtuous Women (1962)
- Memories of the Sword (2015)
- Memories of Murder (2003)
- Men of Plastic (2022)
- Midnight (2021)
- Midnight FM (2010)
- Milky Way Liberation Front (2007)
- A Millionaire's First Love (2006)
- A Millionaire on the Run (2012)
- Miracle: Letters to the President (2021)
- Miracle on 1st Street (2007)
- Miss & Mrs. Cops (2019)
- Miss Gold Digger (2007)
- Mission: Possible (2021)
- Mission: Cross (2024)
- Modern Boy (2008)
- A Moment to Remember (2004)
- Monopoly (2006)
- The Moon (2023)
- The Moon Is... the Sun's Dream (1992)
- More than Blue (2009)
- More Than Family (2020)
- Mother (1985)
- Mother (2009)
- Mountain Strawberries (1982)
- Mountain Strawberries 2 (1985)
- Mountain Strawberries 3 (1987)
- Mountain Strawberries 4 (1991)
- Mountain Strawberries 5 (1992)
- Mountain Strawberries 6 (1994)
- Moshi Monsters: The Movie (2013)
- Mr. Butterfly (2003)
- Mr. Gam's Victory (2004)
- Mr. Handy (2004)
- Mr. Idol (2011)
- Mr. Socrates (2005)
- Mr. Wacky (2004)
- Mug Travel (2007)
- Muhwagwa (1935)
- Mulberry (Ppong) (1986)
- Muoi: The Legend of a Portrait (2007)
- Murder, Take One (2005)
- Musa (2001)
- A Muse (2012)
- Mutt Boy (2003)
- My Beautiful Girl, Mari (2002)
- My Black Mini Dress (2011)
- My Boss, My Hero (2001)
- My Boss, My Teacher (2006)
- My Boyfriend is Type B (2005)
- My Brother (2004)
- My Daughter Is a Zombie (2025)
- My Dear Desperado (2010)
- My Dear Enemy (2008)
- My Father (2007)
- My Girl and I (2005)
- My Girlfriend Is An Agent (2007)
- My Heart Puppy (2022)
- My Little Bride (2004)
- My Love (2007)
- My Love, My Bride (1990)
- My Mighty Princess (2008)
- My Mother, the Mermaid (2004)
- My Name Is Loh Kiwan (2024
- My Own Breathing (1999)
- My Piano (2006)
- My PS Partner (2012)
- My Right to Ravage Myself (2003)
- My Sassy Girl (2001)
- My Scary Girl (2006)
- My Son (2007)
- My Teacher, Mr. Kim (2003)
- My Tutor Friend (2003)
- My Tutor Friend 2 (2006)
- My Wife is a Gangster (2001)
- My Wife is a Gangster 2 (2003)
- My Wife is a Gangster 3 (2006)
- My Wife Got Married (2008)
- Mulleya Mulleya (1984)
- Myself in the Distant Future (1997)

== N ==
- Nabi (2001)
- The Naked Kitchen (2009)
- Nambugun: North Korean Partisan in South Korea (1990)
- Nameless Gangster: Rules of the Time (2012)
- National Security (2012)
- Natural City (2003)
- The Neighbor (2012)
- Neumi (1980)
- Never Ending Story (2012)
- Never Forever (2007)
- Never Forget Me (1976)
- Next Sohee (2022)
- Night and Day (2008)
- Night Fairy (1986)
- The Night Owl (2022)
- Nightmare (2000)
- No. 3 (1997)
- No Blood No Tears (2002)
- No Comment (2002)
- No Mercy (2010)
- No Mercy for the Rude (2006)
- No Regret (2006)
- Nobody Knows (1970)
- Nocturnal (2025)
- Noise (2024)
- The Noisy Mansion (2025)
- Nongjungjo (1926)
- A Normal Family (2023)
- North Korean Guys (2003)
- Noryang: Deadly Sea (2023)
- The Novelist's Film (2022)
- Now and Forever (2006)
- Nowhere to Hide (1999)

== O ==
- Oasis (2002)
- Obaltan (1960)
- Ode to My Father (2014)
- Officer Black Belt (2024)
- Oh Mong-nyeo (1937)
- Oh! My Ghost (2022)
- Oh! My God (2006)
- Ok-nyeo (1928)
- The Old Garden (2007)
- The Old Jar Craftsman (1969)
- Old Partner (2009)
- The Old Woman with the Knife (2025)
- Oldboy (2003)
- Olympus Guardian (2005)
- Omniscient Reader: The Prophet (2025)
- On a Windy Day We Must Go to Apgujeong (1993)
- On the Green Carpet (2001)
- On the Occasion of Remembering the Turning Gate (2002)
- Once Upon a Time (2008)
- Once Upon a Time in a Battlefield (2003)
- Once Upon a Time in High School (2004)
- One Fine Spring Day (2001)
- One Win (2023)
- Open City (2008)
- Oseam (1990)
- Oseam (2003)
- Our Construction (1946)
- Our School's E.T. (2008)
- Our Season (2023)
- Our Town (2007)
- Our Twisted Hero (1992)
- Out of My Intention (2008)
- Out to the World (1994)
- Over My Dead Body (2012)
- Over the Rainbow (2002)
- Oyster Village (1972)

== P ==
- Painful Maturity (1980)
- Paradise Murdered (2007)
- Parasite (2019)
- Passion Portrait (1991)
- Patriotic Martyr An Jung-gun (1972)
- Pawn (2020)
- Peasants (1978)
- Peninsula (2020)
- Peppermint Candy (2000)
- The Perfect Couple (2007)
- Perfect Number (2012)
- A Petal (1996)
- Phantom (2023)
- Phantom Queen (1967)
- Phoenix-bot Phoenix King (1984)
- Phone (2002)
- Piagol (1955)
- Picnic (2024
- Pietà (2012)
- Pillar of Mist (1987)
- Pilnyeo (1970)
- Pilot (2024)
- Pipeline (2021)
- The Pirates: The Last Royal Treasure (2022)
- Please Teach Me English (2003)
- The Plighted Love Under the Moon [Ulha ui Mengse] (1923)
- The Plot (2024)
- The Point Men (2023)
- Poison (1997)
- The Policeman's Lineage (2022)
- Police Story (1979)
- Pornmaking for Dummies (2007)
- Pororo: Cyberspace Adventure (2015)
- Pororo Dinosaur Island Adventure (2017)
- Pororo Snow Fairy Adventure (2014)
- Pororo, The Racing Adventure (2013)
- Pororo to the Cookie Castle (2004)
- Pororo Treasure Island Adventure (2019)
- Portrait of a Beauty (2008)
- Possible Changes (2005)
- The Power of Kangwon Province (1998)
- Ppilku (1997)
- The President's Barber (2004)
- The President's Last Bang (2005)
- Pretty Crazy (2025)
- The Priests (2015)
- The Priest 2: Dark Nuns (2025)
- Prince Daewon (1968)
- Prince Yeonsan (1961)
- Princess Aurora (2005)
- Private Tutor (1963)
- Project Makeover (2007)
- Project Silence (2023)
- Project Wolf Hunting (2022)
- Promise of the Flesh (1975)
- Public Enemy (2002)
- Public Enemy Returns (2008)
- Public Toilet (2002)
- Pulgasari (1985)
- Punch (2011)
- Punguna (Soldier of Fortune) (1926)
- Push! Push! (1997)
- Puzzle (2006)
- Pyongyang Nalpharam (2006)

== Q ==
- Quick (2011)
- The Quiet Family (1998)
- Quiz King (2005)

== R ==
- R2B: Return to Base (2012)
- R-Point (2004)
- The Railroad (2007)
- The Rain at Night (1979)
- Rainbow Eyes (2007)
- Rainbow Trout (1999)
- Ransomed (2023)
- Real Fiction (2000)
- Reawaken Man: The Red (2026)
- Rebound (2023)
- Recalled (2021)
- The Recipe (2010)
- The Record (2000)
- Red Carpet (2014)
- Red Mafia (1994)
- The Red Shoes (2005)
- Redeye (2005)
- Remember (2022)
- A Resentful Woman (1973)
- The Restless (2006)
- Resurrection of the Little Match Girl (2002)
- Revelations (2025)
- Reversal of Fortune (2003)
- Revolver (2024)
- Rice (1963)
- Ride Away (2008)
- Righteous Ties (2006)
- Rikidozan (2004)
- The Ring Virus (1999)
- Road Movie (2002)
- Road to Boston (2023)
- Robot Taekwon V (1976)
- The Romance (2006)
- Romance of Their Own (2004)
- The Romantic President (2002)
- Rough Cut (2008)
- The Roundup (2022 film) (2022)
- The Roundup: No Way Out (2023)
- The Roundup: Punishment (2024
- Rules of Dating (2005)
- Running Wild (2006)
- Runaway (1995)
- Runway Cop (2012)

== S ==
- S Diary (2004)
- Sa Bangji (1988)
- Sa-kwa (2005)
- Sad Movie (2005)
- Sad Pastorale (1960)
- Sad Story of Self Supporting Child (1965)
- Salangeul chajaseo (In Search of Love) (1929)
- Samaritan Girl (2004)
- Saulabi (2002)
- Save the Green Planet! (2003)
- Saving My Hubby (2002)
- Say Yes (2001)
- Scandal Makers (2008)
- The Scarlet Letter (2004)
- The Scent (2012)
- Scent of Love (2003)
- The Schoolgirl's Diary (2006)
- Seo Bok (2021)
- The Sea Knows (1961)
- The Sea Village (1965)
- Secret Reunion (2010)
- Secret Sunshine (2007)
- Secret: Untold Melody (2025)
- Seducing Mr. Perfect (2006)
- See You After School (2006)
- Seopyeonje (1993)
- Seoul Evita (1991)
- Seoul Jesus (1986)
- Seoul Raiders (2005)
- Seoul Vibe (2022)
- Serve the People (2022)
- Seven Days (2007)
- Sex Is Zero (2002)
- Sex Is Zero 2 (2007)
- Shadowless Sword (2005)
- Shadow (1935)
- Shadows in the Palace (2007)
- Shark Bait (2006)
- She's on Duty (2005)
- Shinsukki Blues (2004)
- Shiri (1999)
- Show Me the Ghost (2021)
- The Show Must Go On (2007)
- Silmido (2003)
- Sinkhole (2021)
- A Single Spark (1995)
- Silenced (2011)
- Silver Stallion (1991)
- Single in Seoul (2023)
- Singles (2003)
- Sisters on the Road (2009)
- Skeletons in the Closet (aka Shim's Family) (2007)
- Sleep (2023)
- A Small Ball Shot by a Midget (1981)
- Small Town Rivals (2007)
- Smugglers (2023)
- So Cute (2003)
- Socialphobia (2015)
- Solace (2006)
- A Soldier Speaks after Death (1966)
- Some (2004)
- Somebody (2024)
- Someone Special (2004)
- Son of Man (1980)
- Soo (2007)
- Sopyonje (1993)
- Sorum (2001)
- Soulmate (2023)
- Souls Protest (2000)
- Space Monster Wangmagwi (1967)
- Special Delivery (2022)
- Spellbound (2011)
- Spider Forest (2004)
- The Spies (2012)
- Spirit of Korean Celadon (2002)
- Spring Bears Love (2003)
- Spring in My Hometown (1998)
- Spring, Summer, Fall, Winter... and Spring (2003)
- Springtime (2004)
- Spy Girl (2004)
- The Stray Bullet (1960)
- Story of Janghwa and Hongryeon (1936)
- A Story of the Day after Arirang (1930)
- The Story of Hong Gil-dong (1967)
- Story of Wine (2008)
- Stray Dogs (1983)
- Streaming (2025)
- The Student Boarder (1966)
- The Story of Two Women (1994)
- Suddenly at Midnight (1981)
- Summertime (2001)
- Sunflower (2006)
- Sunny(2008)
- Sunny(2011)
- The Surrogate Woman (1987)
- Susanne Brink's Arirang (1991)
- Sweet & Sour (2021)
- Switch (2023)
- Sword in the Moon (2003)
- Sympathy for Lady Vengeance (2005)
- Sympathy for Mr. Vengeance (2002)

== T ==
- The Taebaek Mountains (1994)
- Taegukgi (2004)
- Take Care of My Cat (2001)
- Take Off (2009)
- Tale of Cinema (2005)
- A Tale of Two Sisters (2003)
- Tang Poetry (2005)
- The Taste of Money (2012)
- Tazza: The Hidden Card (2014)
- Tazza: The High Rollers (2006)
- Tears (2001)
- Tell Me Something (1999)
- Theresa's Lover (1991)
- The Thieves (2012)
- This Charming Girl (2005)
- Three (2002)
- The Three-Day Reign (1973)
- Three... Extremes (2004)
- Thunderbird (2022)
- Tidal Wave (2009)
- Time (2006)
- To Catch a Virgin Ghost (2004)
- To Sir, with Love (2006)
- To the Starry Island (1993)
- To You, from Me (1994)
- Too Beautiful to Lie (2004)
- Touch-Me-Not (1956)
- The Tower (2012)
- The Town Across the River (1935)
- Traces of Love (2006)
- The Tragedy of Deaf Sam-yong (1973)
- Train to Busan (2016)
- Transgression (1974)
- A Traveler's Needs (2024)
- Trio (1997)
- Troll Factory (2024)
- Tube (2003)
- Twenty (2015)
- Twilight Train (1957)
- The Twins (2005)
- Two Cops (1993)
- Two Cops 2 (1996)
- Two Cops 3 (1998)
- Two Faces of My Girlfriend (2007)
- Typhoon (2005)

== U ==
- Unborn But Forgotten (2002)
- Unbowed (2011)
- The Unforgiven (2005)
- The Uninvited (2003)
- Unlocked (2023)
- Unstoppable Marriage (2007)
- Unsung Heroes (1978–1981)
- Untold Scandal (2003)
- Uprising (2024
- Urban Myths (2022)
- Ureme 1 (1986)
- Ureme 2 (1986)
- Ureme 3 (1987)
- Ureme 4 (1987)
- Ureme 5 (1988)
- Ureme 6 (1989)
- Ureme 7 (1992)

== V ==
- Vampire Cop Ricky (2006)
- Venus and Mars (2007)
- Venus Talk (2014)
- Victory (2024)
- Virgin Snow (2007)
- Virgin Stripped Bare by Her Bachelors (2000)
- Virus (2025)
- Viva Freedom! (1946)
- Voice (2005)
- Voice (2021)
- Voice of a Murderer (2007)
- Volcano High (2001)

== W ==
- A Wacky Switch (2004)
- Waikiki Brothers (2001)
- Walk Up (2022)
- War of the Arrows (2011)
- War of the God Monsters (1985)
- Wanee & Junah (2001)
- Water Lady (1979)
- The Way Home (2002)
- Way to Go, Rose (2006)
- Wedding Campaign (2005)
- Wedding Dress (2009)
- The Weight (2012)
- Welcome to Dongmakgol (2005)
- Welcome to Pyongyang Animal Park (2001)
- A Werewolf Boy (2012)
- West 32nd (2007)
- Wet Dreams (2002)
- Wet Dreams 2 (2005)
- What Does That Nature Say to You (2025)
- When a Woman Breaks Her Jewel Box (1971)
- When I Turned Nine (2004)
- When Spring Comes (2022)
- When Romance Meets Destiny (2005)
- Whispering Corridors (1998)
- White Badge (1992)
- White: Melody of Death (2011)
- White Night (2009)
- White Valentine (1999)
- Who Drives Me Crazy (1995)
- Who Slept with Her (2006)
- Why the Cuckoo Cries (1967)
- Why Did You Come to My House? (2009)
- Why Has Bodhi-Dharma Left for the East? (1989)
- Wide Awake (2007)
- The Wig (2005)
- Wild Animals (1996)
- Wind Echoing in My Being (1997)
- Windstruck (2004)
- Winter Woman (1977)
- Wishing Stairs (2003)
- The Witch: Part 2. The Other One (2022)
- The Wolf Returns (2004)
- Woman (1968)
- Woman is the Future of Man (2004)
- Woman of Fire (1971)
- Woman of Fire '82 (1982)
- Woman on the Beach (2006)
- A Woman's War (1957)
- Women's History Trilogy (2004)
- Wonderful Days (2003)
- Wonderful Radio (2012)
- Wonderland (2024)
- Written (2007)

== Y ==
- Yadang: The Snitch (2025)
- Yaksha: Ruthless Operations (2022)
- Yangsan Province (1955)
- A Year-End Medley (2021)
- Yellow Hair (1999)
- Yellow Hair 2 (2001)
- Yesterday (2002)
- Yobi, the Five Tailed Fox (2007)
- Yongary, Monster from the Deep (1967)
- Yonggary (1999)
- You Are My Sunshine (2005)
- You Are the Apple of My Eye (2025)
- You My Rose Mellow (1988)
- You're My Pet (2011)
- Yumi's Cells: The Movie (2024)

== Z ==
- Zombie Crush in Heyri (2021)
- Zombie Fighter (2020)
- Zombie School (film) (2014)

== See also ==
- Contemporary culture of South Korea
- Contemporary culture of North Korea
- List of Korean films of 1919–1948
- List of North Korean films
- List of South Korean films
