= List of South Korean films of 1991 =

A list of films produced in South Korea in 1991:

Title	Director	Cast	Genre	Notes
1991
Berlin Report	Park Kwang-su			
Mountain Strawberries 5	Kim Su-hyeong	Guk Hui	Ero	
Beyond the Mountain	Chung Ji-young	Choi Jin-young		
Can't Survive on Rice Alone				
Death Song	Kim Ho-sun	Chang Mi-hee		Best Film at the Chunsa Film Art Awards
Fly High Run Far	Im Kwon-taek	Lee Deok-hwa		Best Film at the Grand Bell Awards
For Agnes				
General's Son II	Im Kwon-taek	Park Sang-min		
Madame Aema 5	Suk Do-won	So Bi-a	Ero	
Mountain Strawberries 4	Kim Su-hyeong	Gang Hye-ji	Ero	
Passion Portrait	Kwak Ji-kyoon	Jeong Bo-seok		Best Film at the Grand Bell Awards
Road to the Racetrack	Jang Sun-woo			
The Room in the Forest 숲속의 방	Oh Byeong-cheol	Choi Jin-sil; Kim Sung-ryung		
Seoul Evita	Park Chul-soo			
Silver Stallion	Jang Kil-soo			
Son's Country				
Susanne Brink's Arirang 수잔 브링크의 아리랑	Jang Kil-soo	Choi Jin-sil; Kim Yun-gyeong		
Theresa's Lover	Park Chul-soo			
Who Saw the Dragon's Toenails?	Kang Woo-suk			
