= List of South Korean films of 1994 =

A list of films produced in South Korea in 1994:

Title	Director	Cast	Genre	Notes
1994
Coffee, Copy and a Bloody Nose	Kim Yu-min			
Deep Scratch	Kim Sung-hong			
The Fox with Nine Tails	Park Heon-soo		Action	
How to Top My Wife	Kang Woo-suk	Choi Jin-sil; Park Joong-hoon	Comedy	
I Am a Man	Bae Chang-ho			
I Wish For What Is Forbidden 나는 소망한다, 내게 금지된 것을	Jang Kil-soo	Lim Seong-min; Choi Jin-sil; Yu O-seong		
Life and Death of the Hollywood Kid	Chung Ji-young			
Love Pro, Marriage Amateur	Lee Doo-yong			
Madame Aema 10	Suk Do-won	O No-a	Ero	
Manmubang	Eom Jong-seon			
Mountain Strawberries 6	Kim Su-hyeong	Gang Hye-ji	Ero	
Out to the World	Yeo Kyun-dong	Moon Sung-keun	Black-comedy	
The Rules of the Game	Jang Hyun-soo			
Sado Sade Impotence	Park Chul-soo			
The Story of Two Women	Lee Jung-gook	Kim Seo-ra	Drama	Best Film at the Grand Bell Awards
The Taebaek Mountains	Im Kwon-taek	Ahn Sung-ki		Entered into the 45th Berlin International Film Festival
Terrorist	Kim Young-bin	Choi Min-soo; Lee Geung-young		
To You, from Me	Jang Sun-woo	Moon Sung-keun; Jung Sun-kyung	Romance	
La Vie En Rose	Kim Hong-joon			

== See also ==
- 1994 in South Korea
- 1994 in Film
