= List of South Korean films of 1993 =

A list of films produced in South Korea in 1993:

Title	Director	Cast	Genre	Notes
1993
First Love	Lee Myung-se			
Hwa-Om-Kyung	Jang Sun-woo	Oh Tae-kyung		Entered into the 44th Berlin International Film Festival
I Will Survive	Yoon Sam-yook	Lee Deok-hwa		Entered into the 18th Moscow International Film Festival
Madame Aema 8	Suk Do-won	Ru Mina; Kang Eun-ah	Ero	
Madame Aema 9	Kim Sung-su	Jin Ju-hui	Ero	
Seopyeonje	Im Kwon-taek	Oh Jung-hae		
That Man, That Woman	Kim Ui-seok			
To the Starry Island	Park Kwang-su	Ahn Sung-ki		
Two Cops	Kang Woo-suk	Ahn Sung-ki		
Ureme 8	Kim Cheong-gi	Shim Hyung-rae		
We Must Go to Apgujeong-dong on Windy Days	Yoo Ha			
