= List of feature film series with six entries =

This is a list of film series that have six entries.

Key:

- (A) – Film series is 100% animated
- (a) – Film series is not 100% animated and has live action in a sequel or prequel
- (TV) – made-for-TV
- (V) – direct-to-video
- (*) – TV series attached

== 0-9 ==
- 1920
  1. 1920 (2008)
  2. 1920: Evil Returns (2012)
  3. 1920 London (2016)
  4. 1921 (2018) (spin-off)
  5. 1920: Horrors of the Heart (2023)
  6. 1920: Cold Winter (2027)

== A ==
- Ah Boys to Men
  1. Ah Boys to Men (2012)
  2. Ah Boys to Men 2 (2013)
  3. Ah Boys to Men 3: Frogmen (2015)
  4. Ah Boys to Men 4 (2017)
  5. Ah Girls Go Army (2022) (spin-off)
  6. Ah Girls Go Army Again (2022) (spin-off)
- Aces Go Places (a.k.a. Mad Mission)
  1. Aces Go Places (1982)
  2. Aces Go Places 2 (1983)
  3. Aces Go Places 3 (1984)
  4. Aces Go Places 4 (1986)
  5. Aces Go Places 5 (1989)
  6. '97 Aces Go Places (1997)
- The Adventures of Bill and Bob
  1. The Adventures of Bill and Bob (1920)
  2. Catching a Coon (1921)
  3. The American Badger (1921)
  4. The Civet Cat (1921)
  5. The Skunk (1921)
  6. Trailing the Coyote (1921)
- Alien Nation *
  1. Alien Nation (1988)
  2. Alien Nation: Dark Horizon (1994) (TV)
  3. Alien Nation: Body and Soul (1995) (TV)
  4. Alien Nation: Millennium (1996) (TV)
  5. Alien Nation: The Enemy Within (1996) (TV)
  6. Alien Nation: The Udara Legacy (1997) (TV)
- Ang Panday *
  1. Ang Panday (1980)
  2. Pagbabalik ng Panday (1981)
  3. Ang Panday: Ikatlong yugto (1982)
  4. Ang Panday IV (Ika-apat na aklat) (1984)
  5. Dugo ng Panday (1993)
  6. Hiwaga ng Panday (1998)

== B ==
- The Blue Lagoon
  1. The Blue Lagoon (1923)
  2. The Blue Lagoon (1949) (remake)
  3. The Blue Lagoon (1980) (remake)
  4. Pengantin Pantai Biru (1983) (remake)
  5. Return to the Blue Lagoon (1991) (remake)
  6. Blue Lagoon: The Awakening (2012) (TV) (remake)
- Boys Life
  1. Boys Life: Three Stories of Love, Lust, and Liberation (1994)
  2. Boys Life 2 (1997)
  3. Boys Life 3 (2000)
  4. Boys Life 4: Four Play (2003)
  5. Boys Life 5 (2006) (V)
  6. Boys Life 6 (2007) (V)
- The Brotherhood
  1. The Brotherhood (2001) (V)
  2. The Brotherhood II (2001) (V)
  3. The Brotherhood III (2002) (V)
  4. The Brotherhood IV: The Complex (2005) (V)
  5. The Brotherhood V (2009) (V)
  6. The Brotherhood VI (2009) (V)
- Be-Bop High School *
  1. Be-Bop High School (1985)
  2. Be-Bop High School: Kōkō Yotarō Aika (1986)
  3. Be-Bop High School: Kōkō Yotarō Kōshinkyoku (1987)
  4. Be-Bop High School: Kōkō Yotarō Kyōsō-kyoku (1987)
  5. Be-Bop High School: Kōkō Yotarō Ondo (1988)
  6. Be-Bop High School: Kōkō Yotarō Kanketsu-hen (1988)

The 1994 film of the same title, a re-adaptation, was directed by creator Kazuhiro Kiuchi.

- Bibi Blocksberg *
  1. Bibi Blocksberg (2002)
  2. Bibi Blocksberg and the Secret of the Blue Owls (2004)
  3. Bibi & Tina (2014)
  4. Bibi & Tina: Bewildered and Bewitched (2014)
  5. Bibi & Tina: Girls vs. Boys (2016)
  6. Bibi & Tina: Perfect Pandemonium (2017)

== C ==
- A Cinderella Story
  1. A Cinderella Story (2004)
  2. Another Cinderella Story (2008) (V)
  3. A Cinderella Story: Once Upon a Song (2011) (V)
  4. A Cinderella Story: If the Shoe Fits (2016) (V)
  5. A Cinderella Story: Christmas Wish (2019) (V)
  6. A Cinderella Story: Starstruck (2021) (V)
- Cappy Ricks
  1. Cappy Ricks (1921)
  2. The Go-Getter (1923)
  3. More Pay - Less Work (1926)
  4. Cappy Ricks Returns (1935)
  5. Affairs of Cappy Ricks (1937)
  6. The Go Getter (1937)
- Coplan (Agent FX 18) *
  1. To Catch a Spy (1957)
  2. FX 18 Secret Agent (1964)
  3. The Spy I Love (1964)
  4. FX 18 Superspy (1965)
  5. Mexican Slayride (1967)
  6. Coplan Saves His Skin (1968)

== D ==
- Death Wish
  1. Death Wish (1974)
  2. Death Wish II (1982)
  3. Death Wish 3 (1985)
  4. Death Wish 4: The Crackdown (1987)
  5. Death Wish V: The Face of Death (1994)
  6. Death Wish (2018) (remake)
- Death Race
1. Death Race 2000 (1975)
2. Death Race (2008) (remake)
3. Death Race 2 (2010) (V) (prequel)
4. Death Race 3: Inferno (2013) (V) (prequel)
5. Death Race 2050 (2017) (V)
6. Death Race: Beyond Anarchy (2018) (V) (remake)
- Deathstalker
1. Deathstalker (1983)
2. Deathstalker II (1987) (V)
3. Deathstalker and the Warriors from Hell (1988) (V)
4. Deathstalker IV: Match of Titans (1990) (V)
5. Barbarian (2003) (V) (remake)
6. Deathstalker (2025) (remake)
- D@bbe
  1. D@bbe (2006)
  2. D@bbe 2 (2009)
  3. D@bbe: Bir Cin Vakası (2012)
  4. D@bbe: Curse of the Jinn (2013)
  5. D@bbe: Zehr-i Cin (2014)
  6. Dab6e (2015)
- Dorf
  1. Dorf on Golf (1987) (V)
  2. Dorf's Golf Bible (1987) (V)
  3. Dorf and the First Games of Mount Olympus (1988) (V)
  4. Dorf Goes Auto Racing (1990) (V)
  5. Dorf Goes Fishing (1993) (V)
  6. Dorf on the Diamond (1996) (V)
- Dr. Christian *
  1. Meet Dr. Christian (1939)
  2. Remedy for Riches (1940)
  3. The Courageous Dr. Christian (1940)
  4. Dr. Christian Meets the Women (1940)
  5. Melody for Three (1941)
  6. They Meet Again (1941)

== E ==
- Ed McBain's 87th Precinct *
  1. Cop Hater (1958)
  2. The Pusher (1960)
  3. Fuzz (1972)
  4. Ed McBain's 87th Precinct: Lightning (1995) (TV)
  5. Ed McBain's 87th Precinct: Ice (1996) (TV)
  6. Ed McBain's 87th Precinct: Heatwave (1997) (TV)

== F ==
- Final Destination
  1. Final Destination (2000)
  2. Final Destination 2 (2003)
  3. Final Destination 3 (2006)
  4. The Final Destination (2009)
  5. Final Destination 5 (2011) (prequel)
  6. Final Destination Bloodlines (2025)
- Frank Janek *
  1. Internal Affairs (1988) (TV)
  2. Murder in Black and White (1990) (TV)
  3. Murder Times Seven (1990) (TV)
  4. Terror on Track 9 (1992) (TV)
  5. The Forget-Me-Not Murders (1994) (TV)
  6. Janek: The Silent Betrayal (1994) (TV)

== G ==
- G.I. Joe (a)
  1. G.I. Joe: The Movie (1987) (A) (V)
  2. G.I. Joe: Spy Troops (2003) (A) (V)
  3. G.I. Joe: Valor vs. Venom (2004) (A) (V)
  4. G.I. Joe: The Rise of Cobra (2009)
  5. G.I. Joe: Retaliation (2013)
  6. Snake Eyes (2021) (reboot)
- Garfield (a)
  1. Garfield: The Movie (2004)
  2. Garfield: A Tail of Two Kitties (2006)
  3. Garfield Gets Real (2007) (A) (V)
  4. Garfield's Fun Fest (2008) (A) (V)
  5. Garfield's Pet Force (2009) (A) (V)
  6. The Garfield Movie (2024) (A)
- Grindhouse
1. Death Proof (2007)
2. Planet Terror (2007)
3. Machete (2010) (spin-off)
4. Hobo with a Shotgun (2011) (spin-off)
5. Machete Kills (2013) (spin-off)
6. Thanksgiving (2023) (spin-off)
- Le gendarme [Total Length : 9h47 (587 min.)]
  1. Le gendarme de Saint-Tropez (1964) [Length : 1h32 (92 min.)]
  2. Le gendarme à New York (1965) [Length : 1h40 (100 min.)]
  3. Le gendarme se marie (1968) [Length : 1h32 (92 min.)]
  4. Le gendarme en balade (1970) [Length : 1h47 (107 min.)]
  5. Le gendarme et les extra-terrestres (1979) [Length : 1h36 (96 min.)]
  6. Le gendarme et les gendarmettes (1982) [Length : 1h40 (100 min.)]
- God of Gamblers
  1. God of Gamblers (1989)
  2. God of Gamblers Returns (1994)
  3. God of Gamblers 3: The Early Stage (1996)
  4. From Vegas to Macau (2014)
  5. From Vegas to Macau II (2015)
  6. From Vegas to Macau III (2016)
- Goofy *
  1. Superstar Goofy (1972)
  2. The Roots of Goofy (1984) (TV)
  3. An All New Adventure of Disney's Sport Goofy (1987) (TV)
  4. Goofy's Guide to Success (1990) (TV)
  5. A Goofy Movie (1995)
  6. An Extremely Goofy Movie (2000) (V)

== H ==
- House Party
  1. House Party (1990)
  2. House Party 2 (1991)
  3. House Party 3 (1994)
  4. House Party 4: Down to the Last Minute (2000) (V)
  5. House Party: Tonight's the Night (2013) (V) (retcon)
  6. House Party (2023) (reboot)
- Home Alone
  1. Home Alone (1990)
  2. Home Alone 2: Lost in New York (1992)
  3. Home Alone 3 (1997)
  4. Home Alone 4 (2002) (TV)
  5. Home Alone: The Holiday Heist (2012) (TV)
  6. Home Sweet Home Alone (2021)
- Hellboy (a)
  1. Hellboy (2004)
  2. Hellboy: Sword of Storms (2006) (A) (TV)
  3. Hellboy: Blood and Iron (2007) (A) (TV)
  4. Hellboy II: The Golden Army (2008)
  5. Hellboy (2019) (reboot)
  6. Hellboy: The Crooked Man (2024) (reboot)
- The Hunger Games
  1. The Hunger Games (2012)
  2. The Hunger Games: Catching Fire (2013)
  3. The Hunger Games: Mockingjay – Part 1 (2014)
  4. The Hunger Games: Mockingjay – Part 2 (2015)
  5. The Hunger Games: The Ballad of Songbirds & Snakes (2023) (prequel)
  6. The Hunger Games: Sunrise on the Reaping (2026) (prequel)
- Hailey Dean Mysteries
  1. Murder, With Love (2016) (TV)
  2. Deadly Estate (2017) (TV)
  3. Dating is Murder (2017) (TV)
  4. 2+2=Murder (2018) (TV)
  5. A Marriage Made for Murder (2018) (TV)
  6. A Will to Kill (2018) (TV)
- Hausfrauen-Report
  1. Hausfrauen-Report 1: Unglaublich, aber wahr (1971)
  2. Hausfrauen-Report 2 (1971)
  3. Hausfrauen-Report 3 (1972)
  4. Hausfrauen-Report international (1973)
  5. Hausfrauen-Report 4 (1973)
  6. Hausfrauen-Report 6: Warum gehen Frauen fremd? (1978)
- Herbie *
  1. The Love Bug (1968)
  2. Herbie Rides Again (1974)
  3. Herbie Goes to Monte Carlo (1977)
  4. Herbie Goes Bananas (1980)
  5. The Love Bug (1997) (TV)
  6. Herbie: Fully Loaded (2005)
- Hideshi Hino's Theater of Horror
  1. The Boy from Hell (2004) (a.k.a. Jigoku Kozou)
  2. Dead Girl Walking (2004)
  3. Lizard Baby (2004)
  4. The Ravaged House: Zoroku's Disease (2004) (a.k.a. Tadareta Ie: Zoroku no Kibyo)
  5. The Doll Cemetery (2004)
  6. Death Train (2004)
- Homunculus
  1. Homunculus, 1. Teil (1916)
  2. Homunculus, 2. Teil – Das geheimnisvolle Buch (1916)
  3. Homunculus, 3. Teil – Die Liebestragödie des Homunculus (1916)
  4. Homunculus, 4. Teil – Die Rache des Homunculus (1916)
  5. Homunculus, 5. Teil – Die Vernichtung der Menschheit (1916)
  6. Homunculus, 6. Teil – Das Ende des Homunculus (1916)

== I ==
- The Invisible Man (Universal series)
  1. The Invisible Man (1933)
  2. The Invisible Man Returns (1940)
  3. The Invisible Woman (1940)
  4. Invisible Agent (1942)
  5. The Invisible Man's Revenge (1944)
  6. Abbott and Costello Meet the Invisible Man (1951)
- Inspector Gadget (a) ***
  1. The Amazing Adventures of Inspector Gadget (1986) (A) (V)
  2. Inspector Gadget (1999)
  3. Inspector Gadget: Gadget's Greatest Gadgets (2000) (A) (V)
  4. Inspector Gadget's Last Case (2002) (A) (TV)
  5. Inspector Gadget 2 (2003) (V)
  6. Inspector Gadget's Biggest Caper Ever (2005) (A) (V)
- Insidious
  1. Insidious (2010)
  2. Insidious: Chapter 2 (2013)
  3. Insidious: Chapter 3 (2015) (prequel)
  4. Insidious: The Last Key (2018) (prequel)
  5. Insidious: The Red Door (2023)
  6. Insidious: Out of the Further (2026)
- The Inner Sanctum Mysteries
  1. Calling Dr. Death (1943)
  2. Weird Woman (1944)
  3. Dead Man's Eyes (1944)
  4. The Frozen Ghost (1945)
  5. Strange Confession (1945)
  6. Pillow of Death (1945)
- Inspecteur Lavardin
  1. Chicken with Vinegar (1985)
  2. Inspecteur Lavardin (1986)
  3. L'Escargot noir (1988) (TV)
  4. Le diable en ville (1989) (TV)
  5. Maux croisés (1989) (TV)
  6. Le Château du pendu (1990) (TV)

== J ==
- Jack Ryan *
  1. The Hunt for Red October (1990)
  2. Patriot Games (1992)
  3. Clear and Present Danger (1994)
  4. The Sum of All Fears (2002) (reboot)
  5. Jack Ryan: Shadow Recruit (2014) (reboot)
  6. Jack Ryan: Ghost War (2026) (reboot)

== K ==
- The Karate Kid **
  1. The Karate Kid (1984)
  2. The Karate Kid Part II (1986)
  3. The Karate Kid Part III (1989)
  4. The Next Karate Kid (1994)
  5. The Karate Kid (2010)
  6. Karate Kid: Legends (2025)
- Karate Warrior
  1. Karate Warrior (1987)
  2. Karate Warrior 2 (1988)
  3. Karate Warrior 3 (1991)
  4. Karate Warrior 4 (1992)
  5. Karate Warrior 5 (1992)
  6. Karate Warrior 6 (1993)
- Killjoy
  1. Killjoy (2000) (V)
  2. Killjoy 2: Deliverance from Evil (2002) (V)
  3. Killjoy 3 (2010) (V)
  4. Killjoy Goes to Hell (2012) (V)
  5. Killjoy’s Psycho Circus (2016) (V)
  6. Bunker of Blood 07: Killjoy’s Carnage Caravan (2019) (V)
- Kim Du-han
  1. Shillog Kim Du-han (1974)
  2. Hyeobgag Kim Du-han (1975)
  3. Kim Du-han 3 (1975)
  4. Kim Du-han 4 (1975)
  5. Kim Du-han hyeong shirasoni hyeong (1981)
  6. Kim Du-hangwa seodaemun (1981)

== L ==
- Laß jucken, Kumpel
  1. Laß jucken, Kumpel (1972)
  2. Laß jucken, Kumpel 2. Teil – Das Bullenkloster (1973)
  3. Laß jucken, Kumpel 3. Teil – Maloche, Bier und Bett (1974)
  4. Liebesgrüße aus der Lederhose 2. Teil: Zwei Kumpel auf der Alm (crossover, 1974)
  5. Der Kumpel läßt das Jucken nicht (1975)
  6. Laß laufen, Kumpel (1981)
- Lone Wolf and Cub *
  1. Lone Wolf and Cub: Sword of Vengeance (1972)
  2. Lone Wolf and Cub: Baby Cart at the River Styx (1972)
  3. Lone Wolf and Cub: Baby Cart to Hades (1972)
  4. Lone Wolf and Cub: Baby Cart in Peril (1972)
  5. Lone Wolf and Cub: Baby Cart in the Land of Demons (1973)
  6. Lone Wolf and Cub: White Heaven in Hell (1974)

Note: The first two films were edited together to make Shogun Assassin (1980)

== M ==
- Mountain Strawberries
  1. Mountain Strawberries (1982)
  2. Mountain Strawberries 2 (1985)
  3. Mountain Strawberries 3 (1987)
  4. Mountain Strawberries 4 (1991)
  5. Mountain Strawberries 5 (1992)
  6. Mountain Strawberries 6 (1994)
- Megalopolis Expressway Trial (a.k.a. Freeway Speedway. Tokyo Speedway)
  1. Megalopolis Expressway Trial (1988)
  2. Megalopolis Expressway Trial 2 (1990)
  3. Megalopolis Expressway Trial 3 (1991)
  4. Megalopolis Expressway Trial 4 (1992)
  5. Megalopolis Expressway Trial 5: Final Battle (1993)
  6. Megalopolis Expressway Trial Max (1996)
- Maechun
  1. Maechun (1988)
  2. Maechun 2 (1989)
  3. Maechun 3 (1993)
  4. Maechun 4 (1994)
  5. Maechun 5 (1994)
  6. Maechun 6 (1995)
- The Marine
  1. The Marine (2006)
  2. The Marine 2 (2009) (V)
  3. The Marine 3: Homefront (2013) (V)
  4. The Marine 4: Moving Target (2015) (V)
  5. The Marine 5: Battleground (2017) (V)
  6. The Marine 6: Close Quarters (2018) (V)
- Monsterverse **
  1. Godzilla (2014) (reboot)
  2. Kong: Skull Island (2017) (reboot)
  3. Godzilla: King of the Monsters (2019) (reboot)
  4. Godzilla vs. Kong (2021) (crossover)
  5. Godzilla x Kong: The New Empire (2024) (crossover)
  6. Godzilla x Kong: Supernova (2027) (crossover)
- Mărgelatu
  1. Drumul oaselor (1980)
  2. Trandafirul galben (1982)
  3. Misterele Bucureștilor (1983)
  4. Masca de argint (1985)
  5. Colierul de turcoaze (1986)
  6. Totul se plătește (1987)
- Mazinger ** (A)
  1. Mazinger Z Vs. Devilman (1974)
  2. Mazinger Z Vs. The Great General of Darkness (1974)
  3. Great Mazinger tai Getter Robot (1975)
  4. Great Mazinger tai Getter Robot G: Kuchu Daigekitotsu (1975)
  5. UFO Robot Grendizer tai Great Mazinger (1976)
  6. Grendizer, Getter Robot G, Great Mazinger: Kessen! Daikaijuu (1976)
- Mr. Wong
  1. Mr. Wong, Detective (1938)
  2. The Mystery of Mr. Wong (1939)
  3. Mr. Wong in Chinatown (1939)
  4. The Fatal Hour (1940)
  5. Doomed to Die (1940)
  6. Phantom of Chinatown (1940)

== O ==
- Ocean's
  1. Ocean's 11 (1960)
  2. Ocean's Eleven (2001) (remake)
  3. Ocean's Twelve (2004) (remake)
  4. Ocean's Thirteen (2007) (remake)
  5. Ocean's 8 (2018) (spin-off)
  6. Untitled Ocean's Eleven prequel (2027) (prequel)
- The Omen *
  1. The Omen (1976)
  2. Damien – Omen II (1978)
  3. The Final Conflict (1981)
  4. Omen IV: The Awakening (1994)
  5. The Omen (2006) (remake)
  6. The First Omen (2024) (prequel)
- Once Upon A Time In China *
  1. Once Upon a Time in China (1991)
  2. Once Upon a Time in China II (1992)
  3. Once Upon a Time in China III (1993)
  4. Once Upon a Time in China IV (1993)
  5. Once Upon a Time in China V (1994)
  6. Once Upon a Time in China and America (1997)
- Otto
  1. Otto – Der Film (1985)
  2. Otto: The New Movie (1987)
  3. Otto: The Alien from East Frisia (1989)
  4. Otto – Der Liebesfilm (1992)
  5. Otto – Der Katastrofenfilm (2000)
  6. Otto's Eleven (2010)

== P ==
- Psycho *
  1. Psycho (1960)
  2. Psycho II (1983)
  3. Psycho III (1986)
  4. Bates Motel (1987) (TV) (retcon)
  5. Psycho IV: The Beginning (1990) (TV)
  6. Psycho (1998) (remake)
- Pedro Penduko ***
  1. Pedro Penduko (1954)
  2. Ang Mahiwagang Daigdig ni Pedro Penduko (1973)
  3. Bagsik at Kamandag ni Pedro Penduko (1974)
  4. Ang Pagbabalik ni Pedro Penduko (1994)
  5. Pedro Penduko, Episode II: The Return of the Comeback (2000)
  6. Penduko (pre-production)
- Perry Mason (Warner Bros. Series)
  1. The Case of the Howling Dog (1934)
  2. The Case of the Curious Bride (1935)
  3. The Case of the Lucky Legs (1935)
  4. The Case of the Velvet Claws (1936)
  5. The Case of the Black Cat (1936)
  6. The Case of the Stuttering Bishop (1937)
- Polt
  1. Polt muss weinen (2000) (TV)
  2. Blumen für Polt (2001) (TV)
  3. Himmel, Polt und Hölle (2003) (TV)
  4. Polterabend (film) (2003) (TV)
  5. Polt. (2013) (TV)
  6. Alt aber Polt (2018) (TV)

== R ==
- Rambo *
  1. First Blood (1982)
  2. Rambo: First Blood Part II (1985)
  3. Rambo III (1988)
  4. Rambo (2008)
  5. Rambo: Last Blood (2019)
  6. John Rambo (2027) (prequel)
- Return of the Living Dead
  1. The Return of the Living Dead (1985)
  2. Return of the Living Dead Part II (1988)
  3. Return of the Living Dead 3 (1993)
  4. Return of the Living Dead: Necropolis (2005) (TV)
  5. Return of the Living Dead: Rave to the Grave (2005) (TV)
  6. Return of the Living Dead (TBA) (retcon)
- REC
1. REC (2007)
2. Quarantine (2008) (remake)
3. REC 2 (2009)
4. Quarantine 2: Terminal (2011) (remake)
5. REC 3: Genesis (2012)
6. REC 4: Apocalypse (2014)
- Recep İvedik
  1. Recep İvedik (2008)
  2. Recep İvedik 2 (2009)
  3. Recep İvedik 3 (2010)
  4. Recep İvedik 4 (2014)
  5. Recep İvedik 5 (2017)
  6. Recep İvedik 6 (2019)
- Pte Frank Randle
  1. Somewhere in England (1942)
  2. Somewhere in Camp (1943)
  3. Somewhere on Leave (1943)
  4. Somewhere in Civvies (1942)
  5. Somewhere in Politics (1948)
  6. It's a Grand Life (1953)
- Rugrats ** (alternate series)
  1. The Rugrats Movie (1998)
  2. Rugrats: Acorn Nuts and Diapey Butts (2000) (TV)
  3. Rugrats in Paris: The Movie (2000)
  4. Rugrats Go Wild! (2003)
  5. Rugrats: Tales from the Crib – Snow White (2005) (V)
  6. Rugrats: Tales from the Crib – Three Jacks and a Beanstalk (2006) (V)

== S ==
- Scary Movie
1. Scary Movie (2000)
2. Scary Movie 2 (2001)
3. Scary Movie 3 (2003)
4. Scary Movie 4 (2006)
5. Scary Movie 5 (2013)
6. Scary Movie (2026) (retcon)
- SpongeBob SquarePants (A) *
1. The SpongeBob SquarePants Movie (2004)
2. The SpongeBob Movie: Sponge Out of Water (2015)
3. The SpongeBob Movie: Sponge on the Run (2020)
4. Saving Bikini Bottom: The Sandy Cheeks Movie (2024) (spin-off)
5. Plankton: The Movie (2025) (spin-off)
6. The SpongeBob Movie: Search for SquarePants (2025)
- Step Up
1. Step Up (2006)
2. Step Up 2: The Streets (2008)
3. Step Up 3D (2010)
4. Step Up Revolution (2012)
5. Step Up: All In (2014)
6. Step Up: Year of the Dance (2019) (spin-off)
- Sony's Spider-Man Universe
1. Venom (2018) (spin-off)
2. Venom: Let There Be Carnage (2021) (spin-off)
3. Morbius (2022) (spin-off)
4. Madame Web (2024) (spin-off)
5. Venom: The Last Dance (2024) (spin-off)
6. Kraven the Hunter (2024) (spin-off)
- Subspecies
1. Subspecies (1991)
2. Bloodstone: Subspecies II (1993) (V)
3. Bloodlust: Subspecies III (1994) (V)
4. Vampire Journals (1997) (V) (spin-off)
5. Subspecies 4: Bloodstorm (1998) (V)
6. Subspecies V: Blood Rise (2023) (V)
- Saint Seiya
1. Evil Goddess Eris (1987)
2. The Heated Battle of the Gods (1988)
3. Legend of Crimson Youth (1988)
4. Warriors of the Final Holy Battle (1989)
5. Heaven Chapter ~ Overture (2004)
6. Saint Seiya: Legend of Sanctuary (2014)
- Scattergood Baines
1. Scattergood Baines (1941)
2. Scattergood Pulls the Strings (1941)
3. Scattergood Meets Broadway (1941)
4. Scattergood Rides High (1942)
5. Scattergood Survives a Murder (1942)
6. Cinderella Swings It (1943)
- The School Teacher
1. The School Teacher (1975)
2. The Schoolteacher Goes to Boys' High (1977)
3. The School Teacher in the House (1978)
4. L'insegnante balla... con tutta la classe (1979)
5. L'insegnante al mare con tutta la classe (1980)
6. L'insegnante di violoncello (1989)
- Sexton Blake *
1. Sexton Blake and the Bearded Doctor (1935)
2. Sexton Blake and the Mademoiselle (1936)
3. Sexton Blake and the Hooded Terror (1938)
4. Meet Sexton Blake (1945)
5. The Echo Murders (1945)
6. Murder at Site 3 (1958)
- Sexy Susan
1. The Sweet Sins of Sexy Susan (1967)
2. Sexy Susan Sins Again (1968)
3. House of Pleasure (1969)
4. Frau Wirtin treibt es jetzt noch toller (1970)
5. Frau Wirtin bläst auch gern Trompete (1970)
6. The Countess Died of Laughter (1973)
- Shamrock Ellison
1. Hostile Country (1950)
2. Marshal of Heldorado (1950)
3. Crooked River (1950)
4. Colorado Ranger (1950)
5. West of the Brazos (1950)
6. Fast on the Draw (1950)
- The Six Million Dollar Man **
1. The Six Million Dollar Man (1973) (TV) (Pilot of the TV series)
2. The Six Million Dollar Man: Wine, Women and War (1973) (TV)
3. The Six Million Dollar Man: The Solid Gold Kidnapping (1973) (TV)
4. The Return of the Six Million Dollar Man and the Bionic Woman (1987) (TV)
5. Bionic Showdown: The Six Million Dollar Man and the Bionic Woman (1989) (TV)
6. Bionic Ever After? (1994) (TV)
- Soldaterkammerater
1. Soldaterkammerater (1958)
2. Soldaterkammerater rykker ud (1959)
3. Soldaterkammerater på vagt (1960)
4. Soldaterkammerater på efterårsmanøvre (1961)
5. Soldaterkammerater på sjov (1962)
6. Soldaterkammerater på bjørnetjeneste (1968)
- Space Battleship Yamato **** (A)
1. Space Battleship Yamato (1977)
2. Farewell to Space Battleship Yamato (1978)
3. Yamato: The New Voyage (1979) (TV)
4. Be Forever Yamato (1980)
5. Final Yamato (1983)
6. Space Battleship Yamato: Resurrection (2009)
- The Stranger
1. Summoned by Shadows (1992) (V)
2. More Than a Messiah (1992) (V)
3. In Memory Alone (1993) (V)
4. The Terror Game (1994) (V)
5. Breach of the Peace (1994) (V)
6. Eye of the Beholder (1996) (V)
- Sune
1. Sune's Summer (1993)
2. Sunes familie (1997)
3. Håkan Bråkan & Josef (2004)
4. The Anderssons in Greece (2012)
5. The Anderssons Hit the Road (2013)
6. The Anderssons Rock the Mountains (2014)
- Suomisen perhe
1. Suomisen perhe (1941)
2. Suomisen Ollin tempaus (1942)
3. Suomisen taiteilijat (1943)
4. Suomisen Olli rakastuu (1944)
5. Suomisen Olli yllättää (1945)
6. Taas tapaamme Suomisen perheen (1959)

== T ==
- The Thin Man
  1. The Thin Man (1934)
  2. After the Thin Man (1936)
  3. Another Thin Man (1939)
  4. Shadow of the Thin Man (1941)
  5. The Thin Man Goes Home (1944)
  6. Song of the Thin Man (1947)
- Terminator ***
  1. The Terminator (1984)
  2. Terminator 2: Judgment Day (1991)
  3. Terminator 3: Rise of the Machines (2003)
  4. Terminator Salvation (2009)
  5. Terminator Genisys (2015) (reboot)
  6. Terminator: Dark Fate (2019) (retcon)
- Trancers
  1. Trancers (1984)
  2. Trancers II (1991) (V)
  3. Trancers III (1992) (V)
  4. Trancers 4: Jack of Swords (1994) (V)
  5. Trancers 5: Sudden Deth (1994) (V)
  6. Trancers 6 (2002) (V)
- Taxi *
  1. Taxi (1998)
  2. Taxi 2 (2000)
  3. Taxi 3 (2003)
  4. Taxi (2004) (remake)
  5. Taxi 4 (2007)
  6. Taxi 5 (2018)
- Thor (a)
  1. Hulk vs. Thor (2009) (A) (V)
  2. Thor (2011)
  3. Thor: Tales of Asgard (2011) (A) (V)
  4. Thor: The Dark World (2013)
  5. Thor: Ragnarok (2017)
  6. Thor: Love and Thunder (2022)
- The Twisted Childhood Universe
  1. Winnie-the-Pooh: Blood and Honey (2023)
  2. Winnie-the-Pooh: Blood and Honey 2 (2024)
  3. Peter Pan's Neverland Nightmare (2025)
  4. Bambi: The Reckoning (2025)
  5. Pinocchio Unstrung (2026)
  6. Winnie-the-Pooh: Blood and Honey 3 – The Lost Years (2027)
- Tactical Unit
  1. PTU (2003) (a.k.a. PTU: Police Tactical Unit, Tactical Unit: Into the Perilous Night)
  2. Tactical Unit: The Code (2008)
  3. Tactical Unit: No Way Out (2009)
  4. Tactical Unit: Human Nature (2009)
  5. Tactical Unit: Comrades in Arms (2009)
  6. Tactical Unit: Partners (2009)
- Tinker Bell ***
  1. Tinker Bell (2008) (V)
  2. Tinker Bell and the Lost Treasure (2009) (V)
  3. Tinker Bell and the Great Fairy Rescue (2010) (V)
  4. Secret of the Wings (2012) (V)
  5. The Pirate Fairy (2014) (V)
  6. Tinker Bell and the Legend of the NeverBeast (2014) (V)

== U ==
- Universal Soldier
  1. Universal Soldier (1992)
  2. Universal Soldier II: Brothers in Arms (1998) (TV)
  3. Universal Soldier III: Unfinished Business (1998) (TV)
  4. Universal Soldier: The Return (1999) (retcon)
  5. Universal Soldier: Regeneration (2009) (V) (retcon)
  6. Universal Soldier: Day of Reckoning (2012) (V) (retcon)
- Urusei Yatsura *
  1. Urusei Yatsura: Only You (1983)
  2. Urusei Yatsura 2: Beautiful Dreamer (1984)
  3. Urusei Yatsura 3: Remember My Love (1985)
  4. Urusei Yatsura 4: Lum the Forever (1986)
  5. Urusei Yatsura 5: The Final Chapter (1988)
  6. Urusei Yatsura 6: Always My Darling (1991)

== V ==
- National Lampoon's Vacation
  1. National Lampoon's Vacation (1983)
  2. National Lampoon's European Vacation (1985)
  3. National Lampoon's Christmas Vacation (1989)
  4. Vegas Vacation (1997)
  5. National Lampoon's Christmas Vacation 2 (2003) (TV) (spin-off)
  6. Vacation (2015)

== W ==
- Wonder Woman (a)
  1. Wonder Woman (1974) (TV)
  2. The New Original Wonder Woman (1975) (TV)
  3. Wonder Woman (2009) (A) (V)
  4. Wonder Woman: Bloodlines (2016) (A) (V)
  5. Wonder Woman (2017)
  6. Wonder Woman 1984 (2020)
- Wallace & Gromit (A)
  1. A Grand Day Out (1989) (TV)
  2. The Wrong Trousers (1993) (TV)
  3. A Close Shave (1995) (TV)
  4. Wallace & Gromit: The Curse of the Were-Rabbit (2005)
  5. A Matter of Loaf and Death (2008) (TV)
  6. Wallace & Gromit: Vengeance Most Fowl (2024)
- The Wild Soccer Bunch
  1. The Wild Soccer Bunch (film) (2003)
  2. The Wild Soccer Bunch 2 (2005)
  3. The Wild Soccer Bunch 3 (2006)
  4. The Wild Soccer Bunch 4 (2007)
  5. The Wild Soccer Bunch 5 (2008)
  6. The Wild Soccer Bunch 6: The Legend Lives! (2016)
- Whispering Corridors
  1. Whispering Corridors (1998)
  2. Memento Mori (1999)
  3. Wishing Stairs (2003)
  4. Voice (2005)
  5. A Blood Pledge (2009)
  6. The Humming (2020)
