= List of South Korean films of 1985 =

A list of films produced in South Korea in 1985:

Title	Director	Cast	Genre	Notes
1985
19-Years Old				
Adultery Tree	Jung Jin-woo	Won Mi-kyung	Historical drama	Best Film at the Grand Bell Awards
Beasts of Prey	Kim Ki-young	Kim Sung-kyom; No Gyeong-sin		
Daengbyeot	Hah Myung-joong			Entered into the 35th Berlin International Film Festival
Deep Blue Night	Bae Chang-ho	Chang Mi-hee; Ahn Sung-ki		
Eoudong	Lee Jang-ho	Lee Bo-hee; Ahn Sung-ki		
Farewell Tokyo				
Gilsottum	Im Kwon-taek			
Madame Aema 3	Jeong In-yeop	Kim Bu-seon	Ero	
Mother	Park Chul-soo			
Mountain Strawberries 2	Kim Su-hyeong	Seonu Il-ran	Ero	
Red Cherry 2				
