= List of South Korean films of 1984 =

A list of films produced in South Korea in 1984:

Title	Director	Cast	Genre	Notes
1984
19th Autumn				
Agada	Kim Hyun-myung			
Carnivore	Kim Ki-young			
The Flying Monster 비천괴수; Bicheongoesu	Kim Jeong-Yong	Kim Ki-Ju; Nam Hye-Gyeong; Kim Da-hye; Moon Tae-Seon	Kaiju	
Hanging Tree	Jung Jin-woo			
Hunting of Fools	Kim Ki-young	Eom Sim-jeong; Kim Seong-geun		
Madame Aema 2	Jeong In-yeop	Oh Su-bi	Ero	
Mulleya Mulleya	Lee Doo-yong	Won Mi-kyung		Best Film at the Grand Bell Awards
My Name is Dokgotak	Hong Sang-man		Animated	
Phoenix-bot Phoenix King			Animated	
Scorching Sun	Hah Myung-joong			
That Winter Was Warm	Bae Chang-ho			
Whale Hunting	Bae Chang-ho			
Love Song 사랑의 찬가; Salang-ui changa		Jeong Yun-hui		
The Companion 동반자; Dongbanja		Jeong Yun-hui		
My Love 3 사랑하는 사람아 제3부; Salanghaneun salam-a 3		Jeong Yun-hui		
