= List of South Korean films of 1992 =

This is a list of South Korean films that received a domestic theatrical release in 1992.

Released	English title	Korean title	Director	Cast	Ref.
11 January	Young-Gu and the Golden Bat	영구와 황금박쥐	Nam Gi-nam	Shim Hyung-rae	
11 January	I Only Want to Live to 20	스무살까지만 살고 싶어요	Kang Woo-suk	Moon Sung-keun	
18 January	As You Please	네 멋대로 해라	Oh Seok-geun	Park Jun-gyu	
22 January	Se-na's Wedding Journal	세나 웨딩 저널	Kim Jeong-jin	Kim Jin-kyoung	
1 February	Myong-Ja Akiko Sonia	명자 아끼꼬 쏘냐	Lee Jang-ho	Kim Myung-gon	
1 February	Like Rain, Like Music	비처럼 음악처럼	Ahn Jae-seok	Shim Hye-jin, Dokgo Young-jae	
15 February	Madame Aema 6	애마부인 6	Suk Do-won	Da Hui-a	
29 February	Kim's War	김의 전쟁	Kim Young-bin	In-chon Yu	
29 February	The Moon Is... the Sun's Dream	달은... 해가 꾸는 꿈	Park Chan-wook	Lee Seung-chul, Na Hyeon-hui	
2 May	Man Upstairs, Woman Downstairs	아래층 여자와 윗층 남자	Shin Seung-soo	Choi Soo-jong	
23 May	Walking All The Way To Heaven	개어 서 하응 누카 지	Jang Hyun-soo	Bae Jong-ok	
4 July	Marriage Story	결혼이야기	Kim Eui-suk	Choi Min-soo, Shim Hye-jin	
15 August	Our Twisted Hero	우리들의 일그러진 영웅	Park Jong-won	Shin Goo, Choi Min-sik	(Note: Best Film at the Chunsa Film Art Awards)
15 August	Madame Aema 7	애마부인 7	Suk Do-won	Kang Seung-mi	
11 September	General's Son III	장군의 아들	Im Kwon-taek	Park Sang-min, Oh Yeon-soo	
2 October	Mister Mama	미스터 맘마	Kang Woo-suk	Choi Min-soo, Choi Jin-sil	
25 December	The Blue in You	그대 안의 블루	Lee Hyun-seung	Ahn Sung-ki, Kang Soo-yeon	
	White Badge	하얀전쟁	Chung Ji-young	Ahn Sung-ki, Lee Geung-young	
	Hyeong-Rae and the Hulk	달 마니 현라 웨아 헐크	Oh Yo-seop	Shim Hyung-rae	

== See also ==
- 1992 in South Korea
