= Madame Aema 7 =

- Theatrical poster for Madame Aema 7 (1992)
- Hangul: 애마부인 7
- Hanja: 愛麻婦人 7
- RR: Aemabuin 7
- MR: Aemabuin 7
- Directed by: Suk Do-won
- Written by: Suk Do-won
- Produced by: Choe Chun-ji
- Starring: Kang Seung-mi
- Cinematography: Ham In-ha
- Edited by: Cho Ki-hyung
- Music by: Kim Eun-gyu
- Distributed by: Yun Bang Films Co., Ltd.
- Release date: August 15, 1992
- Running time: 90 minutes
- Country: South Korea
- Language: Korean

Madame Aema 7 (Korean: 애마부인 7) is a 1992 South Korean film directed by Suk Do-won. It was the seventh entry in the Madame Aema series, the longest-running film series in Korean cinema.

== Plot ==
In this episode in the long-running Madame Aema series, Aema leaves her selfish, middle-aged husband to pursue a career as an actress. She meets a performance artist who persuades her to perform perverted sex acts in the name of art. Finally, repenting of her decision, she returns to her husband.

== Cast ==
- Kang Seung-mi: Aema
- Lee Moo-jung: Hyeon-woo
- Won Seok: Won Seok
- Yoo Seong
- Park Hye-ran: Rubia
- Han Yeong-nam
- Kim Yun-hui: Miss Choe
- Gil Dal-ho
- Seo Eok-seok
- Kwang Bok-dong

== Bibliography ==
=== English ===
- "AEMA BUIN 7". The Complete Index to World Film.
- Aema buin 7 (1992) at IMDb
- "Madame Emma 7 (Aemabu-in 7)(1992)". Korean Movie Database (KMDb).

=== Korean ===
- 애마부인 7 (in Korean). Cine21. Archived from the original on 2016-03-03.
- 애마부인 7 (1992) (in Korean). Korean Movie Database (KMDb).
- "불능의 시대 밤의 여왕 <애마부인> 20년, 그 환각과 도피의 초상 (Article on 20th anniversary of start of series)" (in Korean). Cine21. 2002-02-08. Archived from the original on 2007-09-27.
