= Madame Aema 8 =

- Theatrical poster for Madame Aema 8 (1993)
- Hangul: 애마부인 8
- Hanja: 愛麻婦人 8
- RR: Aemabuin 8
- MR: Aemabuin 8
- Directed by: Suk Do-won
- Written by: Suk Do-won
- Produced by: Choe Chun-ji
- Starring: Ru Mina; Kang Eun-ah
- Cinematography: Ham In-ha
- Edited by: Cho Ki-hyung
- Music by: Gang In-hyeok
- Distributed by: Yun Bang Films Co., Ltd.
- Release date: April 3, 1993
- Running time: 100 minutes
- Country: South Korea
- Language: Korean

Madame Aema 8 (Korean: 애마부인 8) is a 1993 South Korean film directed by Suk Do-won. It was the eighth entry in the Madame Aema series, the longest-running film series in Korean cinema.

== Plot ==
Following the multiple-Aema theme started in Madame Aema 6, this entry in the series has two women named Madame Aema. Both women are dancers, and are friends who differ in their thoughts on marriage. One believes in remaining single, and the other believes in marriage, and does so. After being disappointed with her husband's cheating and gambling, she leaves him. They are later reconciled after the husband repents of his behavior.

== Cast ==
- Ru Mina: Madame Aema
- Kang Eun-ah: Madame Aema
- No Hyeon-u: Hyeon-woo
- Won Seok: Dong-hyeob
- Yoo Seong
- Seo Chang-sook
- Gil Dal-ho
- Cho Hak-ja
- Sue Young-suk

== Bibliography ==
=== English ===
- "AEMA BUIN 8". The Complete Index to World Film.
- Aema buin 8 (1993) at IMDb
- "Madame 8 (Aemabu-in 8)(1993)". KMDb Korean Movie Database.

=== Korean ===
- 애마부인 8 (in Korean). Cine21.
- 애마부인 8 (1993) (in Korean). KMDb Korean Movie Database.
- "불능의 시대 밤의 여왕 <애마부인> 20년, 그 환각과 도피의 초상 (Article on 20th anniversary of start of series)" (in Korean). Cine21. 2002-02-08. Archived from the original on 2007-09-27.
- "<애마부인> 감독 정인엽 인터뷰 (Interview with Madame Aema Director, Seong In-yeob)" (in Korean). Cine21. 2002-02-08. Archived from the original on 2007-09-27.

=== Contemporary reviews ===
- 1993-04-03. "끝없이 춤추는 ‘애마부인’ 시리즈... 제8편 곧 극장개봉 (Endless Aema Buin series, upcoming release of the 8th episode). The Hankyoreh
