= KMDB =

KMDB may refer to:

- Kharkiv Morozov Machine Building Design Bureau, in Ukraine
- Korean Movie Database, a South Korean online database
