= List of South Korean films of 1951 =

This is a list of films produced in South Korea in 1951.

Released	English title	Korean title	Director	Cast	Genre	Notes
1951
15 July	The Footmarks of Barbarian	오랑캐의 발자취	Yun Bong-chun		Documentary	
15 August	The 38th Parallel	내가 넘은 삼팔선	Son Jun		Military, Anti-communism	
15 October	A Bouquet of Three Thousand People	삼천만의 꽃다발	Shin Kyeong-gyun		Melodrama	
20 October	The Artillery School	육군포병학교	Bang Ui-seok		Documentary	
?	An Assault of Justice	정의의 진격	Han Hyeong-mo		Documentary	
?	Hwarangdo	화랑도	Gang Chun		Enlightenment, Anticommunism	
?	The West Front	서부전선	Yun Bong-chun		Documentary	
