= The Blazing Sun =

The Blazing Sun may refer to:

- The Blazing Sun (1950 film), an American western film by John English
- The Blazing Sun (1954 film), an Egyptian romance/drama film by Youssef Chahine
- The Blazing Sun (1984 film), South Korean film by Ha Myeongjung
