= Mountain Strawberries 3 =

- Theatrical poster for Mountain Strawberries 3 (1987)
- Hangul: 산딸기 3
- Hanja: 山딸기 3
- RR: Santtalgi 3
- MR: Santtalgi 3
- Directed by: Kim Su-hyeong
- Written by: Yoo Ji-hoeng
- Produced by: Seo Hyeon
- Starring: Seonu Il-ran
- Cinematography: Park Seung-duck
- Edited by: Ree Kyoung-ja
- Music by: Jeong Min-seob
- Distributed by: Nam A Enterprises Co., Ltd.
- Release date: April 3, 1987
- Running time: 93 minutes
- Country: South Korea
- Language: Korean

Mountain Strawberries 3 (Korean: 산딸기 3), also known as Wild Strawberries 3, is a 1987 South Korean film directed by Kim Su-hyeong. It was the third entry in the Mountain Strawberries series.

== Synopsis ==
A young woman in a village is involved in romantic entanglements during the preparation of a festival celebration.

== Cast ==
- Seonu Il-ran
- Ma Hung-sik
- Kim Kuk-hyeon
- Jang Mi-yeong
- Moon Tai-sun
- Park Yong-pal
- Chung Kyoo-young
- Han Song-i
- Park Jong-sel
- Im Jae-min

== Bibliography ==
=== English ===
- "Wild Strawberries 3 (Santtalgi 3)(1987)". Korean Movie Database (KMDb).

=== Korean ===
- 산딸기 3 (in Korean). Cine21. Archived from the original on 2016-03-03.
- 산딸기 3 (1987) (in Korean). Korean Movie Database (KMDb).
