= Madame Aema 6 =

- Theatrical poster for Madame Aema 6 (1992)
- Hangul: 애마부인 6
- Hanja: 愛麻婦人 6
- RR: Aemabuin 6
- MR: Aemabuin 6
- Directed by: Suk Do-won
- Written by: Suk Do-won
- Produced by: Choe Chun-ji
- Starring: Da Hui-a
- Cinematography: Ham In-ha
- Edited by: Cho Ki-hyung
- Music by: Kim Eun-gyu
- Distributed by: Yun Bang Films Co., Ltd.
- Release date: February 15, 1992
- Country: South Korea
- Language: Korean

Madame Aema 6 (Korean: 애마부인 6) is a 1992 South Korean film directed by Suk Do-won. It was the sixth entry in the Madame Aema series, the longest-running film series in Korean cinema.

== Plot ==
In this entry in the long-running Madame Aema series, three Aemas are represented: a fourth, a fifth, and a sixth generation of women bearing the name Madame Aema. The fourth generation Aema lives on Jeju Island with her daughter and memories of unrequited love. The fifth generation tries to console the fourth generation Aema, while dealing with her own issues of isolation after declaring herself an independent woman. Sixth generation Aema is undergoing marital difficulties with an unfaithful husband whom she eventually divorces.

== Cast ==
- Da Hui-a: 6th Generation Aema
- Ju Ri-hye: 4th Generation Aema
- So Bi-a: 5th Generation Aema
- Dokgo Young-jae: Hyeon-woo
- Won Seok
- Maeng Chan-jae: Suk-woo
- Sue Young-suck
- Yoo Seong
- O He-chan
- Sin Jin-hui

== Bibliography ==
=== English ===
- "AEMA BUIN 6". The Complete Index to World Film.
- Aema buin 6 (1992) at IMDb
- "Madame Emma 6(Aemabu-in 6)(1992)". Korean Movie Database (KMDb).

=== Korean ===
- 애마부인 6 (in Korean). Cine21.
- 애마부인 6 (1992) (in Korean). Korean Movie Database (KMDb).
- "불능의 시대 밤의 여왕 <애마부인> 20년, 그 환각과 도피의 초상 (Article on 20th anniversary of start of series)" (in Korean). Cine21. 2002-02-08. Archived from the original on 2007-09-27.
