= Madame Aema 4 =

- Theatrical poster for Madame Aema 4 (1990)
- Hangul: 애마부인 4
- Hanja: 愛麻婦人 4
- RR: Aemabuin 4
- MR: Aemabuin 4
- Directed by: Suk Do-won
- Written by: Son In-suk
- Produced by: Choe Chun-ji; Shin Seung-ho; Kim Young-ho
- Starring: Ju Ri-hye
- Cinematography: Song Hang-ki
- Edited by: Ree Kyoung-ja
- Music by: Kim Eun-gyu
- Distributed by: Yun Bang Films Co., Ltd.
- Release date: September 1, 1990
- Running time: 96 minutes
- Country: South Korea
- Language: Korean

Madame Aema 4 (Korean: 애마부인 4) is a 1990 South Korean film directed by Suk Do-won. It was the 4th entry in the Madame Aema series, the longest-running film series in Korean cinema.

== Plot ==
In this entry in the long-running Madame Aema series, Aema's husband becomes romantically involved with a Japanese woman after taking a job at a Japanese company. Aema must also contend with two men who are making romantic advances towards her.

== Cast ==
- Ju Ri-hye: Aema
- Lee Dong-jun: husband
- You Young-kook
- Yoon Ji-won: Erica
- Shin Sung-ha: Moon-ho
- Choe Ho-jin: R.O.T.C.
- Jin Yeo-jin: Yoshiko

== Bibliography ==
=== English ===
- Aema buin 4 (1990) at IMDb
- "Madame Emma 4(Aemabu-in 4)(1990)". KMDb Korean Movie Database.

=== Korean ===
- 애마부인 4 (in Korean). Cine21. Archived from the original on 2016-03-03.
- 애마부인 4 (1990) (in Korean). KMDb Korean Movie Database.
- "불능의 시대 밤의 여왕 <애마부인> 20년, 그 환각과 도피의 초상 (Article on 20th anniversary of start of series)" (in Korean). Cine21. 2002-02-08. Archived from the original on 2007-09-27.
