= Ahn So-young =

South Korean actress (born 1959)

- Born: 12 August 1959 (age 67); Seoul, South Korea
- Occupation: Actress
- Years active: 1979–present

Korean name
- Hangul: 안소영
- Hanja: 安昭映
- RR: An Soyeong
- MR: An Soyŏng

Birth name
- Hangul: 안기자
- Hanja: 安基子
- RR: An Gija
- MR: An Kija

Ahn So-young (Korean: 안소영; born August 12, 1959) is a South Korean actress. Ahn was born in Seoul in 1959 and graduated from Jeonghwa Girls' Commerce High School. Ahn debuted in 1979 with Naeil tto naeil (Again Tomorrow) directed by Im Kwon-taek and entered stardom with Madame Aema in 1982.

== Filmography ==
Year	English title	Korean title	Romanization	Role	Director
	The Sun Told Me To...		yeoleum-i sikineundaelo		
1995	A Single Spark		Aleumda-un cheongnyeon Jeon Taeil		
1993	To the Starry Island		Geu seom-e gago sipda		
	Sexual Compatibility		Habgung		
	A Top Knot on Montmartre		Mongmareuteu eondeok-ui sangtu		
1986	Ticket		Tiket		
	Women, Women		Nyeoja, Nyeoja		
	Moonlight Melody		Dalbich mellodi		
	When A Woman Applies Makeup Twice		Yeojaga dubeon hwajanggal ttae		
	My Daughter Rescued from the Swamp		Suleong-eseo geonjin naettal		
	Time of Hate		Miwum-ui sewol		
	Doe		Amsaseum		
	Fiery Wind		Bulbaram		
	Free Maiden		Jayucheonyeo		
1982	Mountain Strawberries		Santtalgi		
	I Hate You, I Hate You, I Hate You		Miwo Miwo Miwo		
	Tan-ya		Tanya		
1982	Madame Aema		Aemabu-in		
	Not for Tonight		Oneulbam-eun cham-euse-yo		
1981	Miss, Please Be Patient		Agassi cham-euse-yo		
	Two Sons		Du adeul		
	Tomorrow After Tomorrow		Nae-il tto nae-il		
	Vicious Woman		Sun-agjil-yeosa		
	Mu-rim Battle		Mulimdaehyeob		

=== Television series ===
Year	Title	Role	Ref.
2022–present	Let's Live Together with Park Won-sook	Cast Member	

== Awards ==
- 1982 the 13th Baeksang Arts Awards : New Film Actress for Madame Aema
