= Madame Aema 2 =

- Theatrical poster for Madame Aema 2 (1984)
- Hangul: 애마부인 2
- Hanja: 愛麻婦人 2
- RR: Aemabuin 2
- MR: Aemabuin 2
- Directed by: Jeong In-yeob
- Written by: Park Yeong
- Produced by: Choe Chun-ji
- Starring: Oh Su-bi
- Cinematography: Lee Seok-ki
- Edited by: Kim Hee-su
- Music by: Shin Byung-ha
- Distributed by: Yeon Bang Films Co., Ltd.
- Release date: February 11, 1984
- Running time: 102 minutes
- Country: South Korea
- Language: Korean

Madame Aema 2 (Korean: 애마부인 2) is a 1984 South Korean film directed by Jeong In-yeob.

== Plot ==
Aema and her husband Hyeon-woo, from Madame Aema (1982) have now divorced. While on vacation on Jeju Island, Aema contemplates her current love affairs with a young entrepreneur jae-ha and sang-yeon, who is a junior of his former husband and collects butterflies in jeju, and returning to her husband, who is now living with another woman. Being lonely, aema rides a horse in the wilderness and makes out with sang-yeon in a tent. Resolving to become independent, Aema declares that love and marriage are separate things.

== Production ==
The film was filmed in Jeju island. While filming the bus collision scene, her glasses poked her nose that the shooting had to be stopped for 5 days.

== Cast ==
- Oh Su-bi: Madame Aema
- Ha Jae-young: Dong-yeob
- Sin Il-ryong: Sang-yeon
- Choe Yun-seok: Hyeon-woo
- Kim Ae-kyung: Erika
- Bang Hee: Hye-ryeon
- Hyeon Ji-hye: Ji-hee

== Bibliography ==
=== English ===
- "AEMA BUIN 2". The Complete Index to World Film.
- Aema buin 2 (1984) at IMDb
- "Madame Ae-ma 2 (Aemabuin 2)(1983)". KMDb Korean Movie Database.

=== Korean ===
- 애마부인 2 (in Korean). Cine21. Archived from the original on 2016-03-03.
- 애마부인 2 (1983) (in Korean). KMDb Korean Movie Database.
- "불능의 시대 밤의 여왕 <애마부인> 20년, 그 환각과 도피의 초상 (Article on 20th anniversary of start of series)" (in Korean). Cine21. 2002-02-08. Archived from the original on 2007-09-27.
- "<애마부인> 감독 정인엽 인터뷰 (Interview with Madame Aema Director, Seong In-yeob)" (in Korean). Cine21. 2002-02-08. Archived from the original on 2007-09-27.
