= Madame Aema 5 =

- Theatrical poster for Madame Aema 5 (1991)
- Hangul: 애마부인 5
- Hanja: 愛麻婦人 5
- RR: Aemabuin 5
- MR: Aemabuin 5
- Directed by: Suk Do-won
- Written by: Lee Mun-ung
- Produced by: Choe Chun-ji; Kim Jun-fu
- Starring: So Bi-a
- Cinematography: Ham In-ha
- Edited by: Ree Kyoung-ja
- Music by: Kang In-goo
- Distributed by: Yun Bang Films Co., Ltd.
- Release date: June 15, 1991
- Running time: 96 minutes
- Country: South Korea
- Language: Korean

Madame Aema 5 (Korean: 애마부인 5) is a 1991 South Korean film directed by Suk Do-won. It was the fifth entry in the Madame Aema series, the longest-running film series in Korean cinema.

== Plot ==
Continuing the storyline started in Madame Aema 4, Aema's husband is still carrying on an his affair with the Japanese woman, Hanako. After much romantic complication, just as Aema decides to divorce her husband she discovers that he has died in Japan because of Hanako.

== Cast ==
- So Bi-a: Aema
- Choi Dong-joon: husband
- Jeon Hye-seong: Erica
- Choe Ho-jin: Ho-jin
- Yeon Hyeon-cheol: Hwa-ga
- Min Hui: Hanako
- Lee Jeong-yeol: Jung-hun
- Sin Jin-hui: Ju-hee
- Jeong Young-kuk
- Kim Gi-jong

== Bibliography ==
=== English ===
- "AEMA BUIN 5". [The Complete Index to World Film].
- Aema buin 5 (1991) at IMDb
- "Madame Emma 5 (Aemabu-in 5)(1991)". [KMDb Korean Movie Database].

=== Korean ===
- 애마부인 5 (1991) (in Korean). [www.cine21.com]. Archived from the original on 2016-03-03.
- 애마부인 5 (1991) (in Korean). [KMDb Korean Movie Database].
- "불능의 시대 밤의 여왕 <애마부인> 20년, 그 환각과 도피의 초상 (Article on 20th anniversary of start of series)" (in Korean). [www.cine21.com]. 2002-02-08. Archived from the original on 2007-09-27.
