= Madame Aema 11 =

- Theatrical poster for Madame Aema 11 (1995)
- Hangul: 애마부인 11
- Hanja: 愛麻婦人 11
- RR: Aemabuin 11
- MR: Aemabuin 11
- Directed by: Joe Moung-hwa
- Written by: Min U
- Produced by: Choe Chun-ji
- Starring: Lee Da-yeon
- Cinematography: Jung Pil-si
- Edited by: Hyeon Dong-chun
- Music by: Kim Nam-yun
- Distributed by: Yun Bang Films Co., Ltd.
- Release date: January 28, 1995
- Running time: 102 minutes
- Country: South Korea
- Language: Korean

Madame Aema 11 (Korean: 애마부인 11) is a 1995 South Korean film directed by Joe Moung-hwa. It was the eleventh and final entry in the Madame Aema series, which holds the distinction of the longest-running film series in Korean cinema.

== Plot ==
In this episode in the Madame Aema series, Aema is married to a respected scholar who is preoccupied with his research and unable to satisfy her sex drive. Aema's husband becomes the target of a Japanese businessman with ties to the yakuza. Seeking to take his research, the Japanese businessman blackmail Aema's husband by taping him in a compromising position with a young woman he has sent to seduce him. Meanwhile, Aema is indulging in an affairs of her own.

== Cast ==
- Lee Da-yeon: Madame Aema
- Lee Joo-cheol
- Joen Hae-yoeng
- Han Eun-jeong
- Cha Ryong
- Yu Ga-hui
- Kook Jong-hwan
- Na Dong-geun
- Choe Myeong-ho
- Jo Seok-hyeon

== Bibliography ==
=== English ===
- "AEMA BUIN 11". [The Complete Index to World Film].
- Aema buin 11 (1995) at IMDb
- "Madame Emma 11 (Aemabu-in 11)(1995)". KMDb Korean Movie Database].

=== Korean ===
- 애마부인 11 (in Korean). [www.cine21.com].
- 애마부인 11 (1995) (in Korean). [KMDb Korean Movie Database].
- "불능의 시대 밤의 여왕 <애마부인> 20년, 그 환각과 도피의 초상 (Article on 20th anniversary of start of series)" (in Korean). [www.cine21.com]. 2002-02-08. Archived from the original on 2007-09-27.
- "<애마부인> 감독 정인엽 인터뷰 (Interview with Madame Aema Director, Seong In-yeob)" (in Korean). www.cine21.com]. 2002-02-08. Archived from the original on 2007-09-27.
