= Mountain Strawberries 2 =

1985 South Korean film by Kim Su-hyeong

- Theatrical poster for Mountain Strawberries 2 (1985)
- Hangul: 산딸기 2
- Hanja: 山딸기 2
- RR: Santtalgi 2
- MR: Santtalgi 2
- Directed by: Kim Su-hyeong
- Written by: Yoo Ji-hoeng
- Produced by: Seo Hyeon
- Starring: Seonu Il-ran
- Cinematography: Park Seung-duck
- Edited by: Ree Kyoung-ja
- Music by: Jeong Min-seob
- Distributed by: Nam A Enterprises Co., Ltd.
- Release date: February 2, 1985
- Running time: 94 minutes
- Country: South Korea
- Language: Korean

Mountain Strawberries 2 (Korean: 산딸기 2), also known as Wild Strawberries 2, is a 1985 South Korean film directed by Kim Su-hyeong. It was the second entry in the Mountain Strawberries series.

== Synopsis ==
A farmer in a community near Jirisan falls in love with and marries an itinerant performer. She plans to betray him by robbing him and leaving with her old boyfriend, another itinerant performer, when he comes to the village. Eventually she realizes she loves the farmer and stays with him.

== Cast ==
- Seonu Il-ran
- Ma Hung-sik
- You Young-kook
- Yeo Woon-kay
- Yang Hyoung-ho
- Kim Ok-jin
- Park Yong-pal
- Son Jeon
- Oh Do-kyu
- Choe Jae-ho

== Bibliography ==
=== English ===
- "Wild Strawberries 2 (Santtalgi 2)(1984)". Korean Movie Database (KMDb).

=== Korean ===
- 산딸기 2 (in Korean). Cine21.
- 산딸기2 (1984) (in Korean). Korean Movie Database (KMDb).
