= A Resentful Woman =

- Poster to A Resentful WomanSpec
- Hangul: 원녀
- Hanja: 怨女
- RR: Wonnyeo
- MR: Wŏnnyŏ
- Directed by: Lee Yu-seob
- Written by: Lee Hee-woo
- Produced by: Shin Sang-ok
- Starring: Shin Yeong-il; Jin Do-hie
- Cinematography: Choi Jong-geol
- Edited by: Lee Kyeong-ja
- Music by: Hwang Mun-pyeong
- Distributed by: Anyang Films
- Release date: August 14, 1973
- Running time: 86 minutes
- Country: South Korea
- Language: Korean

A Resentful Woman (Korean: 원녀) is a 1973 South Korean horror film.

== Plot ==
The spirit of Bo-yeong is unable to ascend to the next world due to her unmarried status. The woman's nanny's spirit tries to help Bo-yeong by arranging a soul-marriage with a villager named Jeong. Jeong's father has been unjustly imprisoned by the dishonest village chief who covets the family's fortune. The nanny's spirit helps Jeong to pass the Bar examination, so that he can save his father. By now in love with Jeong, Bo-yeong and her nanny's spirit pass into heaven.

== Sources ==
- Lee, Seung-hoon (2005-08-04). "(한국영화걸작선) 탄탄한 스토리텔링의 저예산 B급호러, <원녀> ("Solid Story-Telling on a B-Movie Budget, A Resentful Woman)" (in Korean). Cine21. Archived from the original on 2016-03-03.
- 원녀 (A Resented Woman, 1973 - Film review). flyingpink.tistory.com (in Korean). 2007-07-30.
