= So Cute =

- Theatrical poster
- Hangul: 귀여워
- RR: Gwiyeowo
- MR: Kwiyŏwŏ
- Directed by: Kim Soo-hyun
- Written by: Kim Soo-hyun
- Produced by: Hwang Wu-hyeon; Kim-Jho Gwangsoo
- Starring: Ye Ji-won; Kim Suk-hoon; Jung Jae-young; Jang Sun-woo
- Cinematography: Kim Cheol-ju
- Edited by: Kim Hyeon
- Music by: Lee Byung-hoon
- Distributed by: Tube Entertainment
- Release date: November 19, 2004
- Running time: 116 minutes
- Country: South Korea
- Language: Korean

So Cute (Korean: 귀여워) is a 2004 South Korean drama film about four men on the margins of society who fall in love with the same woman. It was selected to screen at the Pusan International Film Festival, the 2005 Brisbane International Film Festival and the 26th Moscow International Film Festival. It marked the acting debut of director Jang Sun-woo.

== Plot ==
Jang Su-ro lives in the slums of Korea with his three sons 963, Dog Nose and So-and-So, who just got out of prison. While So-and-So's loyalties to his mob boss and biological family are put to the test when he finds that his family's home is slated to be demolished by the mob's developers, the rest of the family's life is complicated with the arrival of Sun-yi, Jang's new girlfriend who annoys Dog Nose and attracts the affections of 963.
