= When a Woman Breaks Her Jewel Box =

- Film poster
- Hangul: 옥합을 깨뜨릴 때
- Hanja: 玉盒을 깨뜨릴 때
- RR: Okhabeul kkaetteuril ttae
- MR: Okhabŭl kkaettŭril ttae
- Directed by: Kim Soo-yong
- Written by: Kim Gang-yun; Yoo Han-cheol
- Produced by: Kim Tai-soo
- Starring: Hong Se-mi
- Cinematography: Hong Dong-hyuk
- Edited by: Yu Jae-won
- Music by: Choi Chang-kwon
- Distributed by: Tae Chang Enterprises Co., Ltd.
- Release date: March 13, 1971
- Running time: 83 minutes
- Country: South Korea
- Language: Korean

When a Woman Breaks Her Jewel Box (Korean: 옥합을 깨뜨릴 때; RR: Okhabeul kkaetteuril ttae) is a 1971 South Korean drama film directed by Kim Soo-yong. It was awarded Best Film at the Blue Dragon Film Awards ceremony.

== Name ==
The title of the film is a reference to the anointment of Jesus Christ at Bethany in Matthew 14:3-9, during which a woman poured perfume in her alabaster jar. The title was chosen because the protagonist lets go of the past and makes a new start.

== Synopsis ==
Bo-yeong, young woman living with her father Hyongsik and aunt Yeseon, believes that her mother was killed during the Korean War. She discovers that her mother is not dead, but, after having been raped by an American soldier, has dedicated her life to taking care of orphans.

== Cast ==
- Yoon Jeong-hee – Bo-yeong Yoon.
- Hong Se-mi – Younghee the secretary at the orphanage
- Nam Kung Won – Hyong-sik, the father of Bo-yeong
- Sa Mi-ja – Ye-seon, Bo-yeong's aunt
- Yoon Yang-ha – Hyosup, the fiancee of Bo-yeong
- Chai Jung-hoon – Kyong-il, detective who is formerly an orphan
- Lee Hoon - Kwak Chang su, formerly an orphan
- Park Am - Doctor, who is a friend of Hyong-sik
- Jeon Young-ju - Mother of Kyong-ae
- Ko Seol-bong- Senior inspector
- Kim Hye-ri
- Kim Ki-bum

== Legacy ==
The film is significant for being one of the earliest examples of a negative portrayal of American forces stationed in South Korea in South Korean cinema. The film addresses the issue of sexual assault by Americans, a topic that had been ignored in South Korean popular media until the 1960s.

== Bibliography ==
=== English ===
- Okhabeul ggaedeuril dae (1971) at IMDb
- "When the Jewel Box is Broken (Oghab-eul kkaetteuli...(1971)". Korean Movie Database (KMDb).

=== Korean ===
- 옥합을 깨뜨릴 때 (in Korean). [www.cine21.com].
- 옥합을 깨뜨릴 때 (1971) (in Korean). Korean Movie Database (KMDb).
