= Mountain Strawberries 4 =

- Theatrical poster for Mountain Strawberries 4 (1991)
- Hangul: 산딸기 4
- Hanja: 山딸기 4
- RR: Santtalgi 4
- MR: Santtalgi 4
- Directed by: Kim Su-hyeong
- Written by: Yoo Ji-hoeng
- Produced by: Kim Su-hyeong
- Starring: Gang Hye-ji
- Cinematography: Chun Jo-myuong
- Edited by: Ree Kyoung-ja
- Music by: Lee Jong-sik
- Distributed by: Tae Kwang Films Co., Ltd.
- Release date: March 23, 1991
- Running time: 95 minutes
- Country: South Korea
- Language: Korean

Mountain Strawberries 4 (Korean: 산딸기 4), also known as Wild Strawberries 4, is a 1991 South Korean film directed by Kim Su-hyeong. It was the fourth entry in the Mountain Strawberries series.

== Synopsis ==
In 1950 an unsatisfied widow makes her living selling medicine from village to village while searching for an energetic man to wed. She meets a strong but unintelligent man who works on a boat and wrestles and plays the drum in his spare time. After living with him happily for a short time and bearing him a daughter, the widow's unsatisfied spirit leads her astray. Years later she secretly watches her daughter's wedding, and leaves, beating a drum.

== Cast ==
- Gang Hye-ji
- Yu Jang-hyeon
- Cho Ju-mi
- Kim Kuk-hyeon
- Kook Jong-hwan
- Chung Kyoo-young
- Ju Sang-ho
- Han Tae-il
- Yoo Myeong-sun
- Pak Yae-sook

== Bibliography ==
=== English ===
- "Wild Berries 4 (Santtalgi 4)(1991)". Korean Movie Database (KMDb).

=== Korean ===
- 산딸기 4 (in Korean). Cine21. Archived from the original on 2016-03-03.
- 산딸기 4 (1991) (in Korean). Korean Movie Database (KMDb).
