= Madame Aema 10 =

- Theatrical poster for Madame Aema 10 (1994)
- Hangul: 애마부인 10
- Hanja: 愛麻婦人 10
- RR: Aemabuin 10
- MR: Aemabuin 10
- Directed by: Suk Do-won
- Written by: Suk Do-won
- Produced by: Choe Chun-ji
- Starring: O No-a
- Cinematography: Jaong Il-man
- Edited by: Cho Ki-hyung
- Music by: Kim Eun-gyu
- Distributed by: Yun Bang Films Co., Ltd.
- Release date: June 11, 1994
- Running time: 102 minutes
- Country: South Korea
- Language: Korean

Madame Aema 10 (Korean: 애마부인 10) is a 1994 South Korean film directed by Suk Do-won. It was the tenth entry in the Madame Aema series, the longest-running film series in Korean cinema.

== Plot ==
This time in the Madame Aema series, Aema leaves her husband, tired of his demanding ways. She moves to Jeju Island and lives with her friend, Young-ju. She begins having an affair with a member of a Samul nori group. Shocked by Young-ju's lesbian advances, and persuaded by her boyfriend, Aema returns to her husband.

== Cast ==
- O No-a: Madame Aema
- Won Seok: F
- Go Hyeong-jun: Husband
- Yu Mi-hee: Young-ju
- Yoo Seong: Mok-dong
- Han Yeong-nam: Man
- Hong Seong-mi: Seon-a
- Kim Tae-hwan: Man 1
- Choe Ha-neul: Man 2

== Bibliography ==
=== English ===
- "AEMA BUIN 10". The Complete Index to World Film.
- Aema buin 10 (1994) at IMDb
- "Madame Emma 10 (Aemabu-in 10)(1994)". KMDb Korean Movie Database.

=== Korean ===
- 애마부인 10 (in Korean). Cine21.
- 애마부인 10 (1994) (in Korean). KMDb Korean Movie Database.
- "불능의 시대 밤의 여왕 <애마부인> 20년, 그 환각과 도피의 초상 (Article on 20th anniversary of start of series)" (in Korean). Cine21. 2002-02-08. Archived from the original on 2007-09-27.
- "<애마부인> 감독 정인엽 인터뷰 (Interview with Madame Aema Director, Seong In-yeob)" (in Korean). www.cine21.co]. 2002-02-08. Archived from the original on 2007-09-27.
