= Madame Aema 3 =

- Theatrical poster for Madame Aema 3 (1985)
- Hangul: 애마부인 3
- Hanja: 愛麻婦人 3
- RR: Aemabuin 3
- MR: Aemabuin 3
- Directed by: Jeong In-yeob
- Written by: Park Su-il; Im Yu-sun
- Produced by: Choe Chun-ji
- Starring: Kim Bu-seon
- Cinematography: Lee Seok-ki
- Edited by: Kim Hee-su
- Music by: Shin Byung-ha
- Distributed by: Yun Bang Films Co., Ltd.
- Release date: September 28, 1985
- Running time: 105 minutes
- Country: South Korea
- Language: Korean

Madame Aema 3 (Korean: 애마부인 3) is a 1985 South Korean film directed by Jeong In-yeob. It was the second sequel to Madame Aema (1982), and part of the longest-running film series in Korean cinema.

== Plot ==
Aema is married to a man named Professor Noh in this entry in the Aema Buin series. Professor Noh has become obsessed with sex through his research and wild experiences abroad. Consequently, he is dissatisfied with Aema. Aema has an affair with a professional wrestler who resembles her first boyfriend, then seeks forgiveness from her husband. When their reconciliation ends in a failure, Aema wanders the streets in despair.

== Cast ==
- Kim Bu-seon : Aema
- Lee Jung-gil
- Jang Seung-hwa
- Jin Bong-jin
- Park Won-sook
- O Hye-min
- Kim Chin-tai
- Choi Jong-won
- Jo Yong-gwon
- Kim Uk

== Bibliography ==
=== English ===
- "AEMA BUIN 3". The Complete Index to World Film.
- Aema buin 3 (1985) at IMDb
- "Ae-ma Woman 3 (Aemabu-in 3)(1985)". KMDb Korean Movie Database.

=== Korean ===
- 애마부인 3 (in Korean). Cine21. Archived from the original on 2016-03-03.
- 애마부인 3 (1985) (in Korean). KMDb Korean Movie Database.
- "불능의 시대 밤의 여왕 <애마부인> 20년, 그 환각과 도피의 초상 (Article on 20th anniversary of start of series)" (in Korean). Cine21. 2002-02-08. Archived from the original on 2007-09-27.
- "<애마부인> 감독 정인엽 인터뷰 (Interview with Madame Aema Director, Seong In-yeob)" (in Korean). Cine21. 2002-02-08. Archived from the original on 2007-09-27.
