= Seoul Jesus =

- Poster for Seoul Jesus (1986)
- Hangul: 서울황제
- Hanja: 서울皇帝
- RR: Seoulhwangje
- MR: Sŏurhwangje
- Directed by: Jang Sun-woo
- Written by: Jang Sun-woo
- Starring: Kim Myung-gon; Oh Su-mi
- Cinematography: Seo Jeong-min
- Edited by: Hyeon Dong-chun
- Music by: O Jin-u
- Distributed by: Hyun Jin Films
- Release date: March 27, 1986 (South Korea)
- Running time: 102 minutes
- Country: South Korea
- Language: Korean

Seoul Jesus (Korean: 서울황제; RR: Seoulhwangje; lit. 'Seoul Emperor') is a 1986 South Korean film written and directed by Jang Sun-woo.

== Synopsis ==
A mental patient who believes himself to be Jesus escapes from a mental institution and travels to Seoul planning to save the city from divine judgment.

== Cast ==
- Kim Myung-gon... Jesus
- Oh Su-mi... Woman
- An Yong-nam... Child
- Na Han-il... Male nurse
- Kang Sung-ran... Female nurse
- Park Sang-jo... Doctor
- Kim Gil-ho... 최회장
- Na Ki-su... 왕초
- Kook Jong-hwan... 관리인
- Park Jae-hong... Fisherman

== Bibliography ==
- Seoul Hwangje at IMDb
- Seoul Emperor at the Korean Movie Database (in Korean)
