= Madame Aema 9 =

- Theatrical poster for Madame Aema 9 (1993)
- Hangul: 애마부인 9
- Hanja: 愛麻婦人 9
- RR: Aemabuin 9
- MR: Aemabuin 9
- Directed by: Kim Sung-su
- Written by: Song Jae-beom
- Produced by: Choe Chun-ji
- Starring: Jin Ju-hui
- Cinematography: Seo Il-ryong
- Edited by: Cho Ki-hyung
- Music by: Gang In-hyeok
- Distributed by: Yun Bang Films Co., Ltd.
- Release date: November 6, 1993
- Running time: 95 minutes
- Country: South Korea
- Language: Korean

Madame Aema 9 (Korean: 애마부인 9) is a 1993 South Korean film directed by Kim Sung-su. It was the ninth in the Madame Aema series, the longest-running film series in Korean cinema.

== Plot ==
Aema is a bored housewife married to a successful, workaholic businessman. She begins an affair with Jean, a business associate of her husband's. Her husband suspects and begins tormenting Aema, while not letting on that he knows, to protect a business deal. Aema leaves her husband, but is persuaded to return after heeding advice from a friend.

== Cast ==
- Jin Ju-hui: Aema
- Park Gyeol: Jean
- No Hyeon-u: Hyeon-woo
- Gang Seon-yeong: kang-hee
- Yun Bo-ra: Secretary
- Seo Ji-eun: Model
- Hong Chung-gil: Manager
