= The Birth of Korea =

2024 South Korean documentary film

- Theatrical release poster
- Hangul: 건국전쟁
- Hanja: 建國戰爭
- RR: Geonguk jeonjaeng
- MR: Kŏn'guk chŏnjaeng
- Directed by: Kim Deog-young
- Written by: Kim Deog-young
- Distributed by: Docustory Production Corp.
- Release date: February 1, 2024
- Country: South Korea
- Language: Korean

The Birth of Korea (Korean: 건국전쟁) is a 2024 South Korean documentary film directed and written by Kim Deog-young, depicting the life of Syngman Rhee, the South Korea's first president. The film was released on February 1, 2024. As a low-budget independent documentary, the movie was a huge box office success, reaching number three at the South Korean box office. The film received strong praise and support from South Korean conservative politicians and celebrities. South Korea's opposition Democratic Party accused the film of ignoring the dictatorship and corruption that characterized Syngman Rhee's reign. The analysis by NK News accused the content of the film of distorting historical facts and aiming to glorify Syngman Rhee and recast him as a national hero.

The movie's sequel, The Birth of Korea 2, is scheduled for release in 2025.
