= I Would Rather Kill You =

2025 film by Kim Sang-hoon

- Theatrical release poster
- Hangul: 차라리 죽여
- RR: Charari jugyeo
- MR: Ch'arari chugyŏ
- Directed by: Kim Sang-hoon
- Produced by: Lee Seong-jae; Lee Sang-hyun
- Starring: Kim Ju-eun; Kim Do-yeon; Ahn Jung-gyun
- Edited by: Jeong Se-hoon
- Music by: Baek Eun Woo
- Production companies: Vince Film Co., Ltd. DND Pictures Co., Ltd.
- Distributed by: Movie Brothers
- Release date: February 26, 2025
- Running time: 104 minutes
- Country: South Korea
- Language: Korean

I Would Rather Kill You (Korean: 차라리 죽여) is a 2025 South Korean erotic comedy drama film directed by Kim Sang-hoon, starring Kim Ju-eun, Kim Do-yeon, and Ahn Jung-gyun. The film was released theatrically on February 26, 2025.

== Synopsis ==
After leaving behind the hectic city life, sisters Sun-young and Ji-young move to a secluded rural village. Sun-young, the older sister, is practical and responsible, while Ji-young is carefree and detached. Dae-geun, the passionate youth leader who works tirelessly for the happiness and prosperity of the village, and Bong-sam, the village chief, both fall head over heels for the sisters who bring a fiery energy to their once-quiet town. Other suspicious men begin to obsess over the sisters, including a wanted criminal who causes a stir in the village. One man after another, the village's men fall into the wild trap of desire.

== Cast ==
- Kim Ju-eun as Yu Sun-young
- Kim Do-yeon as Yu Ji-young
- Ahn Jung-gyun as Park Sang-cheol
- Kim Ki-doo as Dae-geun
- Yoon Se-woong as Bong-sam
- Ban Min-jeong as Bong-sam's wife
- Kang Dong-gyun

== Production ==
Principal photography of the film took place in 2024. The trailer of the film was released on February 14, 2025.

== Soundtrack ==
I Would Rather Kill You

Soundtrack album by Shin Myung Keun
- Released: February 26, 2025
- Genre: Soundtrack
- Length: 3:38
- Language: Korean

Tracklisting
No.	Title	Singer(s)	Length
1.	"Love, Stay"	Shin Myung Keun	3:38
Total length:			03:38

== Release ==
The film was released theatrically on February 26, 2025, in South Korea.
