= Lies (1999 film) =

2000 South Korean film

- Film poster
- Directed by: Jang Sun-wu
- Screenplay by: Jang Sun-wu
- Based on: Tell me a Lie by Jang Jung-il
- Produced by: Shin Chul; Jonathan Kim
- Starring: Lee Sang-hyun; Kim Tae-yeon
- Edited by: Park Gok-ji
- Music by: Dalpalan
- Distributed by: Korea Films
- Release date: September 4, 1999 (South Korea)
- Running time: 115 minutes
- Country: South Korea
- Language: Korean
- Budget: $1.14 million

Lies (Korean: 거짓말; RR: Geojinmal) is a South Korean erotic drama film adapted from the banned novel Tell me a Lie by Jang Jung-il, which depicts a sadomasochistic sexual relationship between a 38-year-old sculptor and an 18-year-old highschool student. The film was shot in a semi-cinéma vérité style and features interviews with the author and cast spliced in between scenes. Intended to provoke, the film contains full-frontal nudity, unsimulated sex, coprophilia, and criticisms of South Korean society. It was heavily censored upon its initial release in South Korea, but international releases were left uncut.

== Plot ==
Y is an 18-year-old highschool senior whose friend Woori has struck up a correspondence with J, a 38-year-old sculptor. After talking to him on the phone, she is aroused by the sound of his voice and arranges to meet him at a love hotel so she can have her first sexual encounter on her own terms instead of losing her virginity to rape like her two sisters did. The two have sex as soon as they enter the motel and proceed to have anal and oral sex. In their next tryst, he confides in her his interest in sadomasochism and she allows him to beat her on her buttocks before they have sex again.

As time goes on, they engage in regular trysts where he beats her with increasing intensity, using a wide variety of implements. At first, Y only goes along with it to make J happy, telling Woori that she desires whatever he does, but she eventually takes a liking to being beaten. When J visits his wife in Paris, his relationship with his wife deteriorates when he begs her to beat him; she refuses and the film reveals that his sexual desires have been a strain on their marriage for years.

After an unusually intense beating, Y becomes angry and J offers to let her beat him. She assumes the dominant role in the relationship and they ultimately take turns beating each other. Y's brother discovers the affair and sets fire to J's house. Y cuts her hair and drops out of university and J leaves home and they spend the remainder of their relationship living in hotels, having sex every night, carving tattoos onto their inner thighs, forgoing work and rejecting society. When Y's brother dies in a motorcycle accident and when J runs out of money, Y leaves J in spite of his pleas for her not to. J ultimately moves to Paris to live with his wife.

Years later, J receives a phone call from Y, who is stopping over in Paris on her way to South America to live with her sister. They meet one last in a hotel and she changes into her old school uniform and beats him with the handle of a pickaxe, fulfilling a fantasy he once expressed to her. After the encounter, they never see each other again. When J's wife asks him where he got the tattoo, he lies.

== Production ==
Though the onscreen sex stops just this side of hard-core, it's fairly evident that intercourse, among other things, is actually taking place in some scenes. Production notes assert that Lee fell in love with his co-star during filming but that this was not reciprocated.

== See also ==
- Nudity in film (East Asian cinema since 1929)
- Sadism and masochism in fiction
- Unsimulated sex
