= On the Green Carpet =

2001 film by Rim Chang-bom

- Cover
- Hangul: 푸른 주단우에서
- RR: Pureun judan ueseo
- MR: P'urŭn chudan uesŏ
- Directed by: Rim Chang-bom
- Starring: Ri Gyong-hi; Ri Yong-ho; Ri Kum Suk
- Cinematography: Han Ryong U
- Music by: Jo Song Su
- Production company: Korean Film Studio
- Distributed by: Mokran Video; Korean Film Export and Import Company
- Release date: 2001
- Running time: 81 minutes
- Country: North Korea
- Language: Korean

On the Green Carpet (Korean: 푸른 주단우에서) is a 2001 North Korean film directed by Rim Chang-bom. The film's title refers to the turf of the stadium which annually hosts the May Day mass games in Pyongyang.

== Summary ==
The film is a romantic comedy, which involves a coach who is preparing a group of schoolchildren for the May Day mass games, and a former colleague who has now become his superior. She feels that he is being too demanding of his young performers, as the show he has devised requires a series of multiple somersaults. However, the children are willing to work as hard as necessary to please their leader, Kim Jong Il, and the film culminates in a lavish display of their abilities.

Everyday life in North Korea is presented as being pleasant and trouble-free, with no evidence of reported food shortages and an emphasis on the people's devotion to the "Dear Leader".

== Festival screenings and critical response ==
On the Green Carpet was the first North Korean film to be invited to the Berlin International Film Festival, where it was screened in 2004 as a special one-off event. It had been chosen by the festival committee from a selection of ten films, and aroused a great deal of interest despite being shown without subtitles and with a German-language-only voice-over. The predominantly German audience who saw the film later criticized it for its "Nazi-style propaganda". Sheila Johnson of FIPRESCI regarded it as a "rare and fascinating curiosity", but noted: "On the Green Carpet, with its flat, high-key lighting, functional editing and over-fondness for the zoom lens, could have been made forty years ago; although the subject might be superficially similar, it was executed with none of the technical brilliance of a Leni Riefenstahl movie."

On the Green Carpet has previously been screened at the 23rd Moscow International Film Festival in 2001.
