= To You from Me =

To You, from Me
- Poster for To You, from Me (1994)
- Hangul: 너에게 나를 보낸다
- RR: Neoege nareul bonaenda
- MR: Nŏege narŭl ponaenda
- Directed by: Jang Sun-woo
- Written by: Jang Sun-woo; Koo Sung-zoo
- Produced by: Yoo In-taek
- Starring: Moon Sung-keun; Jeong Seon-kyeong
- Cinematography: You Young-gil
- Edited by: Kim Hyeon
- Music by: Kang San-e
- Distributed by: Age of Planning
- Release date: October 1, 1994 (South Korea)
- Running time: 107 minutes
- Country: South Korea
- Language: Korean

To You, from Me (Korean: 너에게 나를 보낸다; RR: Neoege nareul bonaenda) is a 1994 South Korean film directed by Jang Sun-woo. It was the fifth-highest grossing Korean film for the period 1990–95.

== Synopsis ==
This erotic drama is about a writer involved in a plagiarism suit who becomes romantically involved with a woman with whom he is connected through dreams.

== Cast ==
- Moon Sung-keun as "I"
- Jeong Seon-kyeong as Ba-ji
- Yeo Kyun-dong as Bank clerk
- Kim Boo-seon as Ma-dam
- Choe Jae-yeong as Baek Hyeon-du
- Gong Hyo-seok as Hyeon Jin-bal
- An Jin-hyeong as Saek An-gyeong
- Choi Sun-joong as Lee Jeong-bak

== Director's statement ==
"I used pornography in this film as a style of expression and as a voice of criticism against... morality, the sense of values and the common sense of disjointed modern society."

== Bibliography ==
- Kim, Kyung-hyun (2004). "6. New Korean Cinema Auteurs: Jang Sun-woo's Three 'F' Words: Familism, Fetishism, and Fascism: To You, from Me". The Remasculinization of Korean Cinema. Durham and London: Duke University Press. pp. 177–187. ISBN 0-8223-3267-1.
- Neoege narul bonaenda (1994) at IMDb
- "To you from me(Neo-ege naleul bonaenda)(1994)". Korean Movie Database (KMDb).
