= The Lovers of Woomook-baemi =

Lovers of Woomuk-Baemi
- Poster for Lovers of Woomuk-Baemi (1990)
- Hangul: 우묵배미의 사랑
- RR: Umukbaemiui sarang
- MR: Umukpaemiŭi sarang
- Directed by: Jang Sun-woo
- Written by: Jang Sun-woo; Im Jong-jae
- Produced by: Suh Byung-ki
- Starring: Park Joong-hoon; Choi Myung-gil
- Cinematography: You Young-gil
- Edited by: Kim Hyeon
- Music by: Lee Jong-gu
- Distributed by: Mokad Korea Co., Ltd.
- Release date: March 31, 1990 (South Korea)
- Running time: 114 minutes
- Country: South Korea
- Language: Korean

Lovers of Woomuk-Baemi (Korean: 우묵배미의 사랑; RR: Umukbaemiui sarang), also known as A Short Love Affair, is a 1990 South Korean film directed by Jang Sun-woo.

== Synopsis ==
The film is a melodrama about the love affair of a tailor from the countryside.

== Cast ==
- Park Joong-hoon – Il-do
- Choi Myung-gil – Gong-ryae
- Yoo Hye-ri – Sae-daek
- Lee Dae-keun – Park Seok-hee
- Choi Joo-bong – Nam-su
- Kim Young-ok – Il-do's mother
- Shin Chaong-shik – Il-do's father
- Chung Sang-chul – Na-ri's father
- Seo Kap-sook – Na-ri's mother
- Yang Taek-jo – Choi

== Bibliography ==
- Woomuk-Baemi ui sarang (1990) at IMDb
- "A Short Love Affair (Umugbaemi-ui salang) (1990)". KMDb Korean Movie Database.
