= Bad Movie =

- Poster
- Hangul: 나쁜 영화
- Hanja: 나쁜 映畵
- RR: Nappeun yeonghwa
- MR: Nappŭn yŏnghwa
- Directed by: Jang Sun-woo
- Written by: Jang Sun-woo; Kim Soo-hyun
- Produced by: Ahn Byoung-ju
- Starring: Hang Seul-ki; Park Kyeong-won
- Cinematography: Choi Jeong-won; Cho Yong-kyou; Kim Woo-hyung
- Edited by: Kim Yong-soo
- Music by: Dalpalan; Jung Jae-il
- Distributed by: Miracin Korea Film Company
- Release date: August 2, 1997 (South Korea)
- Running time: 125 minutes
- Country: South Korea
- Language: Korean

Bad Movie (Korean: 나쁜 영화; RR: Nappeun yeonghwa), also known as Timeless, Bottomless Bad Movie, is a 1997 South Korean docudrama film directed by Jang Sun-woo.

Upon its initial release in South Korea, around thirty minutes of footage was censored due to objectionable material; this footage was restored in overseas releases.

== Synopsis ==
A semi-documentary shot with amateur actors depicting various episodes from the violent lives of marginalised and homeless youth in Seoul.

== Cast ==
- Hang Seul-ki (한슬기)
- Choi Mi-seon (최미선)- as "princess"
- Park Kyeong-won (박경원)- as "prince"
- Lee Jae-kyeong (이재경)
- Jang Nam-kyeong (장남경)- as "bird"
- Byeon Sang-gyu (변상규)- as "Red byeon(Bloodshit)"
- Song Kang-ho
- Gi Ju-bong
- Ahn Nae-sang
- Lee Moon-sik - as convenience store owner

== Awards ==
- Pusan International Film Festival (1997) Netpac Award
- Tokyo International Film Festival (1997) Asian Film Award

== Bibliography ==
- Hartzell, Adam. "Bad Movie". koreanfilm.org. Archived from the original on 27 December 2007.
- Kim, Kyung-hyun (2004). "6. New Korean Cinema Auteurs: Jang Sun-woo's Three 'F' Words: Familism, Fetishism, and Fascism: Bad Movie". The Remasculinization of Korean Cinema. Durham and London: Duke University Press. pp. 187–202. ISBN 0-8223-3267-1.
- Nappun yeonghwa (1998) at IMDb
- Stewart, Bhob. "Bad Movie". Allmovie.
- "Timeless, Bottomless (Nappeun yeonghwa)(1997)". KMDb Korean Movie Database.
