= The Flying Monster =

1984 Korean Kaiju film

- SRS Blu-ray art by Matt Frank and Goncalo Lopest
- Directed by: Kim Jeong-Yong
- Written by: Lee Mun-ung
- Produced by: Kim Yong-Deok
- Starring: Nam Hye-Gyeong; Da-hye Kim
- Cinematography: Ilman Jeong-Yong
- Edited by: Dong-chun Hyeon
- Music by: Lee Cheol-hyuk
- Production company: Woosungsa Entertainment
- Release date: January 12, 1985 (South Korea)
- Running time: 85 minutes
- Countries: South Korea; Japan
- Language: Korean

The Flying Monster (Korean: 비천괴수; RR: Bicheongoesu; lit. The Undead Beast) (Note: Also known as War of the God Monsters.) is a 1984 Korean kaiju film directed by Kim Jeong-Yong.

== Plot ==
Dr. Kim (Kim Ki-Ju) a mad scientist teams up with a young reporter named Kang Ok-hee (Nam Hye-Gyeong) to prove that dinosaurs still exist. When giant dinosaurs (and a giant bird-like Pterodactylus) suddenly appear, the doctor and journalist must find a way to save the world.

== Cast ==
- Kim Ki-Ju as Dr. Kim
- Nam Hye-Gyeong as Kang Ok-hee, reporter
- Kim Da-hye as Sohee
- Moon Tae-Seon

== Production ==
The Flying Monster utilizes extensive stock footage of the kaijus from four of Tsuburaya Productions TV series, which includes the following: Ultraman (Pestar), Return of Ultraman (Seagorath, Seamons, Bemstar, and Terochilus), Ultraman Ace (Verokron) and Fireman (Dorigon), as well as the 1971 Taiwanese film The Founding of Ming Dynasty (Two Unnamed Dragons).

== Release ==
The Flying Monster was released in South Korea on January 12, 1985. The film was never released in the United States until SRS Cinema released the film on VHS and Blu-ray on January 21, 2021, as War of the God Monsters.
