= Hah Myung-joong =

South Korean actor and director

- Born: May 14, 1947; Seoul, South Korea
- Occupation: Actor
- Years active: 1952–present
- Children: Ha Joon-won

Korean name
- Hangul: 하명중
- Hanja: 河明中
- RR: Ha Myeongjung
- MR: Ha Myŏngjung

Hah Myung-joong (Korean: 하명중; born May 14, 1947) is a South Korean actor, film director, producer, planner, and screenwriter. Hah started his career as an actor, but expanded his career to film directing, and film producing. Hah graduated from Kyung Hee University with a major in English literature. His brother Ha Gil-jong was a film director. His 1985 film Daengbyeot was entered into the 35th Berlin International Film Festival.

== Filmography ==
*Note; the whole list is referenced.

Year	Title	Role
2007	Mother	Choi In-ho
1990	The Pinwheel that Spins Alone	
1984	Scorching Sun	
1982	Another's Nest	
1982	Mistress	
1982	A Night's Heaven	
1982	Madame Aema	
1982	The Woman and Rain	
1982	Tan-ya	
1981	Son of Man	Min Yo-sub
1980	Woman on Vacation	
1980	Three Women Under the Umbrella	
1980	The Last Witness	Oh Byeong-ho
1980	No Glory, No Flag	
1980	Neumi	Yoon Joon-tae
1979	Flower Woman	
1979	The Woman Who Leaves Work in the Morning	
1979	When Love Blossoms	
1979	26 x 365 = 0	
1979	We Took the Night Train	
1979	Hearts on Fire	
1979	Sudden Flame	
1979	The Family Pedigree	Dani
1979	Do You Know Kotsuni?	
1979	Her Betrayal	
1978	In Vain	
1978	Unsettling Afternoon	
1978	When Sadness Takes Over a Wave	
1978	The Guest in Room Guest and Mother	
1978	I Am Lady Number 77	
1978	Road	
1978	An Echo of Lakeside	
1978	Twilight	
1977	Prankster of Girl's High School	
1977	The Ascension of Han-ne	
1977	Mischief's Marching Song	
1977	A War Diary	
1977	High School Champ	Seung-hyun's brother-in-law
1977	The Two People in the Wall	
1977	Standoff! This is the Beginning of Games	
1977	Yalkae, a Joker in High School	Baek Sang-do
1976	Battle of Eagle	
1976	Rocking Horse And A Girl	
1976	Similar Toes	
1975	The March of Fools	
1975	Flame	
1975	Strange Feeling	
1975	What Should I Do?	
1975	Where is the Light?	
1974	Nasang	
1974	A Tadpole's Courtship	
1974	Hwannyeo	
1974	An Exorcist	
1974	The One Who I Should Meet	
1974	2nights 3days	
1974	Curiosity	
1973	My Heart is Blue Sky	
1973	Special Investigation Bureau Bae Tae Ok Case	
1973	Love With My Whole Body	
1973	Mammy's Wedding	
1973	Fidelity	
1972	Patriotic Martyr An Jung-gun	
1972	Me, Myself and I	
1972	The Pollen of Flowers	
1971	The Hotel Room	
1970	Why She Doesn't Marry	
1970	Though There was No Vow	
1970	Angel, Put Your Clothes on	
1970	Special Marine Corps of No Return	
1970	Revenge of the Snake Woman	
1970	Secret Woman	
1970	The Good Father-in-law	
1970	A Bogus President	
1970	The Legend of Departed Soul	
1970	Wild Bunch of Seven	
1969	Singer and Daughter	
1967	You and Me	

=== Director ===
Year	Title
2009	Joomoonjin
2007	Mother
1990	The Pinwheel that Spins Alone
1986	The Placenta
1984	Scorching Sun
1983	X

=== Producer ===
Year	Title
1996	Yuri
1988	A Second Sex
1986	The Placenta

== Awards ==
- 1971, the 7th Baeksang Arts Awards : New Film Actor (약속은 없었지만)
- 1974, the 10th Baeksang Arts Awards : Best Film Actor (나와 나)
- 1975, the 14th Grand Bell Awards : Best Actor (불꽃)
- 1978, the 17th Grand Bell Awards : Best Actor (족보)
- 1983, the 22nd Grand Bell Awards : Special Award for New Actor (X)
- 1985, the 5th Korean Film Critics Association Awards : Best Actor (땡볕)
- 1991, the 29th Grand Bell Awards : Best Scenario (혼자도는 바람개비)
