= An Assault of Justice =

1951–52 Korean War documentary

- Title card of film
- Hangul: 정의의 진격
- Hanja: 正義의 進擊
- RR: Jeonguiui jingyeok
- MR: Chŏngŭiŭi chin'gyŏk
- Directed by: Han Hyeong-mo
- Production company: Ministry of National Defense (South Korea)
- Release date: 1951
- Country: South Korea
- Language: Korean

An Assault of Justice (Korean: 정의의 진격) is a two-part Korean-language documentary on the Korean War released in 1951 and 1952. It was produced by the South Korean Ministry of National Defense and directed by Han Hyeong-mo. The film is considered historically significant and a stand-out examplar from South Korean documentaries of this period.

Han was in the middle of filming an unrelated movie (「사나이의 길」) in Mokpo when he heard that the war had broken out. On short notice, he grabbed a camera and film, made an armband that identified himself as a journalist for the Ministry of National Defense, and went to film the conflict. Han did not actually receive permission from the Ministry to work on their behalf until later on. He and several other videographers documented the war on various parts of the peninsula. For the film, they also gathered discarded footage that North Korean soldiers left behind, as well as film from United Nations sources.

== Film ==
Part 1 of the film

Part 2 of the film
