= Hwa-Om-Kyung =

- Poster for Hwa-Om-Kyung (1993)
- Hangul: 화엄경
- Hanja: 華嚴經
- RR: Hwaeomgyeong
- MR: Hwaŏmgyŏng
- Directed by: Jang Sun-woo
- Written by: Jang Sun-woo
- Produced by: Lee Tae-won
- Starring: Oh Tae-kyung; Won Mi-kyung
- Cinematography: You Young-gil
- Edited by: Kim Hyeon
- Music by: Yi Zong-gu
- Distributed by: Tae Heung Films Co., Ltd.
- Release date: June 26, 1993 (South Korea)
- Running time: 110 minutes
- Country: South Korea
- Language: Korean
- Box office: $564

Hwa-Om-Kyung (also known as Passage to Buddha) is a 1993 South Korean film written and directed by Jang Sun-woo. It is an adaptation of the Avatamsaka Sutra of Mahayana Buddhism.

The movie in 1994 won the now-defunct Alfred Bauer Prize from the Berlin International Film Festival, an honor for a work that "opens new perspectives on cinematic art.

== Plot ==
This Buddhist-themed story is about a boy searching for his mother, who abandoned him as a baby, and the people he meets on his journey.

== Cast ==
- Oh Tae-kyung as Seon-jae
- Won Mi-kyung as Lady of lotus
- Lee Ho-jae as Beob-un
- Lee Hye-young as Ma-ni
- Kim Hye-sun as I-ryeon
- Lee Dae-ro as Lighthouse keeper
- Dokgo Young-jae as Hae-un
- Shin Hyun-joon as Ji-ho
- Jeong Soo-young as I-na
- Um Chun-bae as Deok-ku

== Awards ==
=== Wins ===
- 44th Berlin International Film Festival (1994), Alfred Bauer Prize

=== Nominations ===
- Berlin International Film Festival (1994), Golden Berlin Bear

== Bibliography ==
- Paquet, Darcy. "Green Fish". koreanfilm.org.
- Aliberti, Davide. "Passage to Buddha". L'Orientale. Università degli Studi di Napoli "L'Orientale".
