= The Blazing Sun (1984 film) =

1985 film

Daengbyeot
- Film poster
- Hangul: 땡볕
- RR: Ttaengbyeot
- MR: Ttaengbyŏt
- Directed by: Hah Myung-joong
- Written by: Kim Yu-jeong; Lee Yong-il; Na Han-bong
- Produced by: Park Jong-chan
- Starring: Hah Myung-joong
- Cinematography: Jeong Kwang-Seok
- Release date: 1985
- Running time: 100 minutes
- Country: South Korea
- Language: Korean

Daengbyeot (Korean: 땡볕), also known in English as The Blazing Sun, is a 1985, South Korean drama film directed by and starring Hah Myung-joong. It was entered into the 35th Berlin International Film Festival.

== Cast ==
- Hah Myung-joong
- Jo Yong-won
- Ju Sang-ho
- Lee In-ok
- Lee Heh-young
