= Jang Sun-woo =

South Korean film director (born 1952)

- Born: March 20, 1952 (age 74); Seoul, South Korea
- Education: Seoul National University (bachelor's degree in anthropology)
- Occupations: Film director, screenwriter
- Years active: 1986–2004

Korean name
- Hangul: 장선우
- Hanja: 張善宇
- RR: Jang Seonu
- MR: Chang Sŏnu

Jang Sun-woo (Korean: 장선우; born March 20, 1952) is a South Korean film director.

== Film career ==
Before his directorial debut, Jang made a name for himself by writing film criticism and scripts. His first film, Seoul Jesus (1986), based on one of his scripts, was noted for its "sarcasm and pronounced realism." His 1993 film Hwa-Om-Kyung won the Alfred Bauer Prize at the 44th Berlin International Film Festival.

== Personal life ==
Jang attended Seoul National University and received a bachelor's degree in anthropology. After the completion of his latest film, he has moved to live in Jeju Island.

== Filmography ==
- Seoul Jesus (1986)
- The Age of Success (1988)
- The Lovers of Woomook-baemi (1989)
- Road to the Racetracks (1991)
- Hwa-Om-Kyung (1993)
- To You from Me (1994)
- Cinema on the Road (1995)
- A Petal (1996)
- Bad Movie (1997)
- Lies (1999)
- Resurrection of the Little Match Girl (2002)

== See also ==
- Cinema of Korea
- List of Korean film directors

== Sources ==
- Rayns, Tony (2007). Jang Sun-woo. Seoul: Seoul Selection. ISBN 978-89-91913-29-5.
- Kim, Kyung-hyun (2004). "6. New Korean Cinema Auteurs: Jang Sun-woo's Three 'F' Words: Familism, Fetishism, and Fascism". The Remasculinization of Korean Cinema. Durham and London: Duke University Press. pp. 162–202. ISBN 0-8223-3267-1.
- Min, Eung-jun; Joo Jin-sook; Kwak Han-ju (2003). "4. Auteur Criticism: The Case of Sunwoo Jang's Taste of Heaven". Korean Film; History, Resistance, and Democratic Imagination. Westport, Connecticut and London: Praeger Publishers. pp. 87–111. ISBN 0-275-95811-6.
