= Mountain Strawberries =

1982 film by Kim Su-hyeong

- Theatrical poster for Mountain Strawberries (1982)
- Hangul: 산딸기
- Hanja: 山딸기
- RR: Santtalgi
- MR: Santtalgi
- Directed by: Kim Su-hyeong
- Written by: Yoo Ji-hoeng
- Produced by: Seo Byeong-jik
- Starring: Ahn So-young
- Cinematography: Chun Jo-myoung
- Edited by: Ree Kyoung-ja
- Music by: Jeong Min-seob
- Distributed by: Nam A Enterprises Co., Ltd.
- Release date: September 4, 1982
- Running time: 97 minutes
- Country: South Korea
- Language: Korean

Mountain Strawberries (Korean: 산딸기) also known as Wild Strawberry is a 1982 South Korean film directed by Kim Su-hyeong. It was the first entry in the Mountain Strawberries series, inspiring five sequels, the last appearing in 1994.

== Background ==
Madame Aema, the first "ero" or erotic film to be made after South Korea's government began relaxing its control of the film industry, was released in February 1982. Mountain Strawberries, starring Aema's Ahn So-young, debuted in September of that year. "Folk erotic" became one of the popular genres of the erotic film in Korea, and Mountain Strawberries was one of the earliest films in that style. Like many of the South Korean erotic films of this era, Mountain Strawberries incorporated melodrama into its softcore pornographic storyline.

== Synopsis ==
Bun-nyeo, a girl in a mountain village loses her virginity to Myong-jun, the village vagabond. After both of her suitors die before they can wed Bun-nyeo, she moves to the city to work in a factory. Myong-jun persuades her to return to the village, but he is arrested for murder. As the film ends, Bun-nyeo is waiting for Myong-jun's release.

== Cast ==
- Ahn So-young
- Namkoong Won
- Jo Dong-jin
- Kim In-moon
- Jin Yoo-young
- Yang Hyoung-ho
- Kim Min
- Kim Ae-kyung
- Moon Mi-bong
- Jo Jeong-su

== Bibliography ==
=== English ===
- "Mountain Strawberries (Santtalgi)(1982)". Korean Movie Database (KMDb).

=== Korean ===
- 산딸기 (in Korean). Cine21.
- 산딸기 (1982) (in Korean). Korean Movie Database (KMDb).
