= Korean Movie Database =

South Korean film online database

The Korean Movie Database (KMDb)
- Website: www.kmdb.or.kr
- Current status: Active

Korean name
- Hangul: 한국영화 데이터베이스
- Hanja: 韓國映畫 데이터베이스
- RR: Hanguk yeonghwa deiteobeiseu
- MR: Han'guk yŏnghwa teit'ŏbeisŭ

The Korean Movie Database (KMDb; Korean: 한국영화 데이터베이스) is a South Korean online database of information related to Korean movies, animation, actors, television shows, production crew personnel, and other film-related information.

== Overview ==
KMDb was first published on February 2, 2006. It is maintained by the Korean Film Archive. While it was modeled after the American online commercial film archive, Internet Movie Database, the site is a public site.

== See also ==
- Cinema of Korea
- AllMovie
- Filmweb
- FindAnyFilm.com
- Rotten Tomatoes
