= Madame Aema =

- Poster to Madame Aema (1982)
- Hangul: 애마부인
- Hanja: 愛麻夫人
- RR: Aemabuin
- MR: Aemabuin
- Directed by: Jeong In-yeob
- Written by: Lee Mun-woong
- Produced by: Choi Chun-ji
- Starring: Ahn So-young; Lim Dong-jin
- Cinematography: Lee Seok-gi
- Edited by: Kim Hui-su
- Music by: Shin Pyong-ha
- Distributed by: Yeonbang Movies
- Release date: February 6, 1982
- Running time: 102 minutes
- Country: South Korea
- Language: Korean

Madame Aema (Korean: 애마부인; also known as Mrs. Emma) is a 1982 South Korean film, an adaptation of a novel by Jo Su-bi. A box-office hit, it was one of only two films to sell more than 100,000 tickets in Seoul during the year of 1982.

== Synopsis ==
While her husband is in prison, Oh Su-bi engages in extramarital affairs. As she is preparing to leave for France with one of her lovers, her husband is released and she returns to him.

== Cast ==
- Ahn So-young: Madame Aema (Oh Su-bi)
- Im Dong-jin: Aema's husband (Shin Hyun-wu)
- Hah Myung-joong
- Ha Jae-young
- Kim Jin-kyu
- Jeon Shook
- Kim Ae-kyung
- Kim Seon-hui
- Moon Tai-sun
- Kim Min-gyu

== Music ==
The theme song for the movie was "Tragic Love(서글픈 사랑)" composed by Shin Byungha and performed by Joo jeong Yi, who was one of the members of the South Korean female duo Saniseul(산이슬). Italian canzone singer Tony Dallara bought the sheet music for the theme song to use it on his album.

== Reception and legacy ==
Madame Aema was the first erotic film to be made after South Korea's government began relaxing its control of the film industry and the enactment of the so called "3S Act". The government's only interference was to change the Chinese characters used in the film's title. The government censors insisted that the characters in the title be changed from "愛馬夫人" (lit. Horse-Loving Lady) to "愛麻夫人" (lit. Hemp-Loving Lady). Both versions of the title are pronounced, "Aema Buin", a hint at the French film Emmanuelle (1974), which had been popular in Korea. The most sexually explicit South Korean film made up to its time, Madame Aema's success ushered in an era of similar erotic films during the 1980s, such as director Lee Doo-yong's Mulberry (1986). The film inspired at least 10 sequels, (Note: See Template:Madame Aema.) making it the longest-running series in the history of Korean cinema.

== Bibliography ==
- Aema buin (1982) at IMDb
- 끝없이 춤추는 '애마부인' 시리즈… 제8편 곧 극장개봉 (The Endless Aema Buin Series). Hankyoreh. 1993-04-03.
- "<애마부인> 감독 정인엽 인터뷰 (Interview with Madame Aema Director, Seong In-yeob)" (in Korean). Cine21. 2002-02-08.
