= Cine21 =

South Korean film magazine

- Type: Weekly magazine
- Format: A4
- Founder: Hangyeore Newspaper
- Publisher: Cine21 Corporation (Hankyoreh Media Group)
- Editor: Chang, Yeong-yeop
- Founded: April 14, 1995
- Language: Korean
- Country: South Korea
- Price: 3,000 Won
- Website: www.cine21.com

Cine21 is a South Korean film magazine published by The Hankyoreh newspaper. The magazine was first published on April 24, 1995, in Seoul, and subsequent issues have continued to be released weekly.

The first editor-in-chief was Cho Seon-hee, the culture desk journalist. The first issue was published with the articles including "Who is controlling Korean film industry", "The vote of 'Korean film power 50'". August 1, 2003, Cine21 was spun off from The Hankoyreh and became an independent subsidiary ("Cine21 Corporation") of the former. As of 2019, the Hankyoreh Media Group owns 85% of the company's shares.

== History ==
Cine21 was the first weekly film magazine published in South Korea. It was born out of the Hankyoreh Media Group's broader goal of promoting meaningful cultural pursuits on a variety of media platforms following the democratic uprising of 1987.

In 2003, Cine21 Co. was established as its own entertainment media company within the Hankyoreh Media Group. This allowed the magazine to broaden its networking power within the film industry.

In 2007, Cine21i Co. was established as a film distribution company within the Hankyoreh Media Group. The company created an online platform that allows digital film files to be downloaded and distributed legally. This helped to revitalize the South Korean film industry.

In 2019, Cine21 was relocating from the Hankyoreh headquarters in Gongdeok-dong, Seoul to the Namsan building in Yejang-dong, Jung-gu, Seoul. That same year, Cine21 was selected as the 'Specialist Magazine of the Year' at the 2nd 'Digital Magazine Awards (DMA 2011)' for its user-friendly design. Cine21 and FOCUS, published by the British public broadcaster BBC, shared the award. Nine media outlets from around the world competed in the final round of the "Professional Magazine of the Year" category at the Digital Magazine Awards, held in London, England.

== Editor-in-chief ==
1. Cho Seon-hee (April 14, 1995 – May 2000)
2. An, Jung-sook (May 2000 – October 2002)
3. Heo, Moon-yung (October 2002 – July 2003)
4. Kim, So-hee (July 2003 – March 2005)
5. Nam, Dong-chul (March 26, 2005 – 500th issue)
6. Ko, Gyung-tae
7. Moon, Suk
8. Lee, Young-jin
9. Lee In-woo (2008)
10. Bae Kyung-rok (2017)
11. Joo Sung-chul (2018 to 2019)
12. Kim Chung-hwan (2019)
13. Han Jeong-taek (2021)
14. Chang Yeong-yeop (Present)

== Distribution ==
100,000 copies of Cine21 are released per week across South Korea. The magazine has additionally expanded to online platforms that allow for a wider audience and diversity of content.

== Others ==
Cine21 is one of the stakeholders of film distributor Little Big Pictures.
