= Bulgasari (disambiguation) =

Bulgasari is a lost 1962 South Korean film by Kim Myeong-je.

Bulgasari or Pulgasari may also refer to:

- Pulgasari, a 1985 North Korean film by Shin Sang-ok, a remake of the 1962 film
- Bulgasari (creature), a legendary creature in Korean mythology and folklore
- Bulgasari, a character from the South Korean television series Tale of the Nine Tailed
- Starfish, sometimes known as Bulgasari or Bulgasalilyu (Korean: 불가사리류) in South Korea
- Tremors, a 1990 American film released in South Korea under the title Bulgasari

== Other uses ==
- Bulgasal: Immortal Souls, a South Korean television series
