= Kang Hyo-shil =

South Korean actress (1932–1996)

- Kang in 1959
- Born: 10 February 1932; Pyongyang, Korea, Empire of Japan
- Died: 2 November 1996 (aged 64)
- Occupation: Actress
- Years active: 1946–1992

Korean name
- Hangul: 강효실
- Hanja: 姜孝實
- RR: Gang Hyosil
- MR: Kang Hyosil

Stage name
- Hangul: 전진희
- RR: Jeon Jinhui
- MR: Chŏn Chinhŭi

Kang Hyo-shil (Korean: 강효실; 10 February 1932 – 2 November 1996) was a South Korean film and stage actress.

== Biography ==
Kang was born in Pyongyang, Heian'nan Province, Korea, Empire of Japan in 1932 (now the capital of North Korea). Kang's parents were Kang Hong-shik, a noted singer, and actor during the Japanese occupation period of Korea and Jeon Ok, a noted actor known as "Queen of Tears", whose excellent acting as tragic heroines that evoked audiences to tears. Kang had a sister who later became a famous actress of North Korea after their parents divorced and went across to North Korea with her father.

Kang in the 1959 film Oh! My Hometown

Kang graduated from Pyongyang Jeoil High School. As having watched her mother's acting, and trained by her mother, Kang was strongly influenced by Jeon Ok. In addition, Kang was more active on stage than in film, so she was referred to as a "characteristic actress" during her lifetime. While Kang debuted with a play performed at Pyongyang National Theatre in 1946 when 17 years old, she earnestly started her career as entered Theatre Sinhyeop. During the performances produced by the Performing Arts Research Association (Geugyesul yeonguhoe), Kang met her future husband, Choi Moo-ryong, who later became a popular film actor of the 1960s and 1970s. When at the 21 years old in Korean age, Kang married Choi despite her mother's opposition. The couple debuted as film actors by starring in Kim Ki-young's 1955 film, Box of Death. Kang used a stage name, Jeon Jin-hui for the film.

Kang and Choi Moo-ryong had one son and four daughters including an actor, Choi Min-soo. However, Choi had an affair with Kim Ji-mee, the most popular actress at that time, that the marriage broke off in 1962 after trials for adultery charge and divorce. Choi soon married Kim Ji-mee but also divorced Kim after 6 years of marriage due to his debts.

Kang died of a chronic disease on 2 November 1996 and her body is buried in Cheonan, Gyeonggi Province.

== Filmography ==
*Note; the whole list is referenced.

English title	Korean title	Romanization	Year	Role	Director
Marriage Story		Gyeolhon-i-yagi	1992		
The Early Years		Chobun	1977		
Towards The High Place		Jeo nop-eun gos-eul hyangha-yeo	1977		
2nights 3days		2bag 3il	1974		
When Night Falls at Myeongdong		Myeongdong-e Bam-i Omyeon	1964		
Oh! My Hometown		O Nae Gohyang	1959		
Early Spring		Jochun	1959		
A Necklace of Reminiscence		Chueogui Mokgeori	1959		
Box of Death		Jugeom-ui sangja	1955		

== Awards ==
- 1970, the 14th Baeksang Arts Awards : TV Best Acting (문기와 수미)
- 1970, Dong-A Theatre Acting Awards : Best Actress.
