= Huh Joon-ho =

South Korean actor (born 1964)

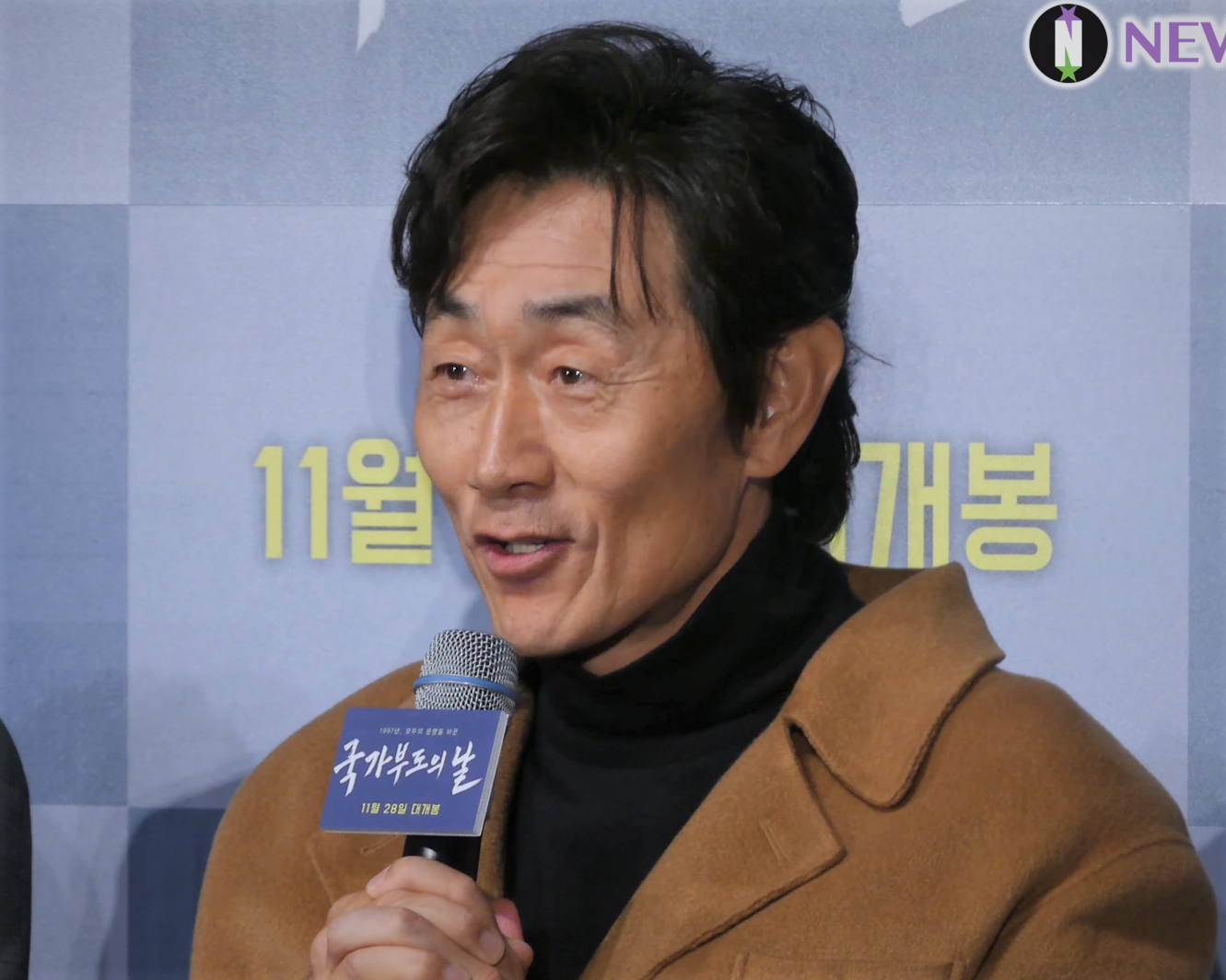
- Huh in 2018
- Born: April 14, 1964 (age 62); Seoul, South Korea
- Education: Seoul Institute of the Arts – Theater
- Occupation: Actor
- Years active: 1985–present
- Agent: Story J Company
- Parent: Heo Jang-kang (father)

Korean name
- Hangul: 허준호
- Hanja: 許峻豪
- RR: Heo Junho
- MR: Hŏ Chunho

Huh Joon-ho (Korean: 허준호; born April 14, 1964) is a South Korean actor. His name was previously officially romanized as Hur Joon-ho and is sometimes romanized unofficially as Heo Joon-ho. Huh began his career in theater and became active in film and television as a character actor, notably in the film Silmido (2003) for which he won Best Supporting Actor at the Grand Bell Awards. He has also reprised the leading role in the stage musical Gambler several times.

== Early life and education ==
Huh Joon-ho, born on March 3, 1964, is the son of actor Heo Jang-kang, a prominent figure in the 1960s and 1970s. He shared that his father taught him the importance of practicing scripts before filming and supported his acting aspirations from a young age.

Huh, a former baseball player at Shinil High School, suffered an injury before college. Concerned about his future, his mother suggested he pursue dance instead. He graduated from Seoul Institute of the Arts with a major in dance and learned to sing through private lessons.

== Career ==
Huh began his career in theater. He made his film debut in director Lee Kyu-hyung's Blue Sketch.

Heo Jun-ho rose to prominence after his 2003 film, Silmido, which was the first Korean film to reach 10 million viewers for which he won Best Supporting Actor at the Grand Bell Awards.

In 2006, He starred in The Restless as Ban-chu, a royal exorcist who harbors resentment over the loss of his family and dies while fighting against corrupt power. In 2006, He founded 'Janggang Entertainment' named after his father, actor Heo Jang-gang. His first work is the fusion historical drama Hae-eo-hwa starring Kim Hee-sun and Park Ji-yoon.

== Personal life ==
Heo Jun-ho, a former Buddhist, converted to Christianity in 2004 after surviving a near-fatal car accident. He is now a devout Christian. He has a daughter.

== Filmography ==
=== Film ===
Year	Title	Role
1986	Chung (Blue Sketch)	Joon-ho
1989	Good Morning, Ms. President	Kim Bbu-ri
1991	A Small Autocratic Republic	Moderator
1991	Green Sleeves	Vietcong Min
1992	27 Roses	Seung-jin
1992	White Badge	Sergeant Hong
1993	We Must Go to Apgujeong-dong on Windy Days	Kyung-tae
1993	To the Starry Island	Villager
1994	Life and Death of the Hollywood Kid	Actor in monitored fight scene (cameo)
1994	Coffee, Copy and a Bloody Nose	(cameo)
1994	Pirates	Heung-baek
1994	Jamon Jamon Seoul	Sung-wook
1995	My Father the Bodyguard	Seung-chul
1995	The Terrorist	Sang-chul
1996	A Petal	Yongdalcha man
1996	Two Men	Tae-sik
1996	Grown-ups Grill the Herring	Park Gong-yeop
1997	The Rocket Was Launched	
1997	Partner	Silhouette
1997	The Last Defense	Na Hee-joo
1997	Man with Flowers	Seok-beom
1998	The Last Attempt	Park Cheol-kyu
1998	Blues	Cafe owner
2000	Artist	(cameo)
2000	Libera Me	Lee In-soo
2001	Volcano High	Mr. Ma
2002	Four Toes	Audie
2003	Silmido	Sergeant Jo Dong-il
2005	Never to Lose	Moon Bong-soo
2005	Dragon Squad	Captain Ko Tung-yuen
2006	The Restless	Ban-chu
2008	His Last Gift	Jo Yeong-woo
2008	The Divine Weapon	Chang-kang
2010	Moss	Ryoo Mok-hyeon
2013	Crimes of Passion	Jung Hee-hyung
2017	The Merciless	Kim Sung-han (special appearance)
2018	Illang: The Wolf Brigade	Lee Gi-seok (special appearance)
2018	Default	Gab-su
2019	Forbidden Dream	Cho Mal-saeng
2020	Innocence	Mayor Choo
2021	Escape from Mogadishu	Rim Young-soo
2023	Dr. Cheon and Lost Talisman	Beom Cheon
2023	Noryang: Deadly Sea	Deng Zilong
2025	Dark Nuns	Father Andrea

=== Television ===
Key
†	Denotes television productions that have not yet been released

Year	Title	Role	Ref.
1988	The Winter That Year Was Warm	In-jae	
1993	My Mother's Sea	Jang-jae	
1993	Walking to Heaven	Yong-dal	
1994	The Last Match	Kim Seon-jae	
1995	A Sunny Place of the Young	Hwang Yoon-bae	
1995	Asphalt Man	Han Ki-soo	
1996	Shooting	Pyo Wang-soo	
1996	Power of Love	Kang-ho	
1997	Revenge and Passion	Choi Sang-do	
1997	The River of Maternal Love		
1998	See and See Again	Park Ki-poong	
1999	Roses and Bean Sprouts	Ho-sik	
1999	The Boss	Balgarak ("Toes")	
1999	Woman on Top	Song Yeon-woo	
1999	Lost Baggage	Yong-man	
2000	Bad Friends	Jung Soo-hyun	
2000	Foolish Princes	Yeo Si-kwang	
2000	The Full Sun	Park Heon-do	
2001	Hotelier		
2002	I Love You, Hyun-jung	Yoo Sang-ho	
2003	All In	Yoo Jong-gu	
2004	Into the Storm	(cameo)	
2004	Precious Family	Park Chang-soo	
2006	Love and Ambition		
2006	Jumong	Hae Mo-su	
2007	Lobbyist	James Lee/Lee Ho-joon	
2016	A Beautiful Mind	Lee Gun-myung	
2017	The Emperor: Owner of the Mask	Dae Mok	
2018	Come and Hug Me	Yoon Hee-jae	
2019–2020	Kingdom	An Hyun	
2019	Designated Survivor: 60 Days	Han Ju-seung	
2020–2023	Missing: The Other Side	Jang Pan-seok	
2021	Undercover	Lim Hyeong-rak	
2021–2022	Snowdrop	Eun Chang-soo	
2022	Why Her	Choi Tae-kook	
2023	Bloodhounds	President Choi	
2025	Buried Hearts	Yeom Jang-soon	
2025	Mercy for None	Lee Joo-woon	
2026	Notes from the Last Row	Kim Su-hun	
2026	Portraits of Delusion †		

== Musical theatre ==
Year	Title	Role	Notes
	Mary, Mary		
	Cats		
	The Sound of Music		
	Hard Rock Cafe		
1999	Gambler	Casino boss	
2000	The Life	Jojo	
2005	Gambler	Casino boss	
2007	Hae-eo-hwa	—N/a	Theatre producer
2008	Gambler	Casino boss	
2009	Chicago	Billy Flynn	

== Accolades ==
=== Awards and nominations ===
Year	Award	Category	Nominated work	Result
1995	16th Blue Dragon Film Awards	Best Supporting Actor	The Terrorist	Won
1998	MBC Drama Awards	Popularity Award		Won
2000	6th Korea Musical Awards	Best Actor	Gambler	Won
2002	8th Korea Musical Awards	Popular Star Award		Won
2003	SBS Drama Awards	Best Supporting Actor	All In	Won
2004	41st Grand Bell Awards	Best Supporting Actor	Silmido	Won
2004	25th Blue Dragon Film Awards	Best Supporting Actor	Silmido	Nominated
2004	3rd Korean Film Awards	Best Supporting Actor	Silmido	Nominated
2006	MBC Drama Awards	Special Award, Actor in a Historical Drama	Jumong	Won
2017	10th Korea Drama Awards	Special Jury Prize	The Emperor: Owner of the Mask	Won
2018	6th APAN Star Awards	Best Supporting Actor	Come and Hug Me	Nominated
2018	2nd The Seoul Awards	Best Supporting Actor (Drama)	Come and Hug Me	Nominated
2018	2nd The Seoul Awards	Special Acting Award	Come and Hug Me	Won
2018	MBC Drama Awards	Top Excellence Award, Actor in a Wednesday-Thursday Miniseries	Come and Hug Me	Nominated
2018	MBC Drama Awards	Actor of the Year	Come and Hug Me	Won
2018	MBC Drama Awards	Golden Acting Award	Come and Hug Me	Won
2021	57th Baeksang Arts Awards	Best Supporting Actor (Film)	Innocence	Nominated
2021	30th Buil Film Awards	Best Supporting Actor	Escape from Mogadishu	Won
2021	41st Korean Association of Film Critics Awards	Best Supporting Actor	Escape from Mogadishu	Won
2021	42nd Blue Dragon Film Awards	Best Supporting Actor	Escape from Mogadishu	Won
2021	8th Korean Film Producers Association Awards	Besะ Supporting Actor	Escape from Mogadishu	Won
2022	58th Baeksang Arts Awards	Best Supporting Actor – Film	Escape from Mogadishu	Nominated
2022	Chunsa Film Art Awards 2022	Best Supporting Actor	Escape from Mogadishu	Nominated
2022	SBS Drama Awards	Top Excellence Award, Actor in a Miniseries Genre/Fantasy Drama	Why Her	Won

=== Listicles ===
Name of publisher, year listed, name of listicle, and placement
Publisher	Year	Listicle	Placement	Ref.
Korean Film Council	2021	Korean Actors 200 (Note: Introduces 200 actors that best represent the present and future of Korean cinema to the people in the film industry all over the world.)	Included	
