= Dokgo Young-jae =

South Korean actor (born 1953)

- Born: Jeon Young-jae; December 13, 1953 (age 72); Gangneung, Gangwon-do, South Korea
- Education: Seoul Drama School
- Occupation: Actor
- Years active: 1973–present
- Agent: Box Media
- Spouse: Lee Eun-ju (m. 1994)
- Children: Dokgo Jun (son); Jeon Ji-eun (daughter)

Korean name
- Hangul: 전영재
- Hanja: 全永宰
- RR: Jeon Yeongjae
- MR: Chŏn Yŏngjae

Stage name
- Hangul: 독고영재
- Hanja: 獨孤永宰
- RR: Dokgo Yeongjae
- MR: Tokko Yŏngjae

Dokgo Young-jae (born Jeon Young-jae on December 13, 1953) is a South Korean actor. He made his film debut in 1973, and also became active in the Dongrang Theatre Ensemble. Dokgo won Best Supporting Actor for White Badge at the Blue Dragon Film Awards in 1992, then became a household name late in his career with the television drama My Mother's Sea in 1993.

His father, actor Dokgo Seong dominated Korean cinema in the 1950s and 1960s.

== Filmography ==
=== Film ===
Year	Title	Role
1973	Raindrops	
1978	Evergreen	
1978	There Must be Mother Somewhere	
1978	A Record of Love and Death	
1979	The Petty Officer and the Admiral	
1979	Grave Wood	
1979	Miss Oh's Apartment	
1983	Yong-pal Has Returned	
1985	A Woman's Castle	
1986	Chung (Blue Sketch)	
1990	North Korean Partisan in South Korea	Lee Bong-gak
1990	Only Because You Are a Woman	
1991	Madame Aema 6	Hyeon-woo
1991	Who Saw the Dragon's Toenails?	
1991	Your Ma's Name Was Chosun Whore	
1991	From Barefoot to Bentz	Chief Hwang
1992	Like Music, Like Rain	Company president Kim
1992	White Badge	Kim Mun-gi
1992	Marriage Story	Park Chang-su
1992	General's Son III	
1993	Hwa-Om-Kyung	Hae-un
1993	Kid Cop	Robbers' boss
1994	The Fox with Nine Tails	Angel of Death No. 69
1994	Life and Death of the Hollywood Kid	Yoon Myeong-gil
1994	To You from Me	(cameo)
1994	Pirates	Kim Tae-woong
1995	My Father the Bodyguard	Joon-tae
1995	The Terrorist	Im Tae-ho
1995	A Single Spark	Young-soo's senior colleague
1996	Cue	Dokgo
1996	Boss	Hyung-jin
1996	The Gate of Destiny	Dadakatsu
1997	The Rocket Was Launched	
1997	The Last Defense	Colonel Dokgo
1998	The Last Attempt	Jung Jin-wook
1998	Story of a Man	Renepa boss
1998	Bedroom and Courtroom	Hee-soo
1998	Naked Being	Mo-ja
2000	The Rules of a Gangster 3	Chairman Go
2000	Striker	Teacher Byun
2003	Live or Die	Lee So-ryong's father
2003	Mr. Butterfly	Colonel Heo
2006	Hanbando	Admiral, commander of naval operations
2006	Vacation	Agency president
2006	Fly High	Nam Gyun (cameo)
2012	90 Minutes	Chairman Min

=== Television series ===
Year	Title	Role
1988	The Winter That Year Was Warm	Young-gak
1993	Friday's Woman – "Choi Myung-gil's Woman on the Edge of the Cliff"	
1993	My Mother's Sea	Choi Seung-joo
1994	Police	Prosecutor Ma Dong-tak
1994	Adam's City	Jo Sang-min
1994	Daughters of a Rich Family	Hyuk-min
1995	Korea Gate	President Park Chung Hee
1996	Power of Love	Moon Kyung-hwan
1997	Gaeksa	Pan-dol
1998	KBS TV Novel – "Eun-ah's Daughter"	
1999	KBS TV Novel – "You"	Kim Jin-tae
2000	The Golden Era	Lee Yong-ho
2001	Sun-hee and Jin-hee	Kang Do-sik
2001	I Want to See Your Face	Kim Jae-min
2001	Lovers	Chairman Dokgo Young-jae
2002	Friends	Gyu-han
2002	Remember	Min Song-joon
2003	Drama City – "Guest"	Heung-soo
2003	Long Live Love	Department head Kang
2004	The Age of Heroes	Park Chung Hee
2004	Forbidden Love	Bureau chief Jang
2005	Let's Go to the Beach	Chairman Jang Dal-bong
2006	Here Comes Ajumma	Shim Tae-joon
2007	The Legend	King Gogugyang
2007	Ahyeon-dong Madam	Kim Sa-hyun
2008	Innocent You	Seo Yoo-il
2009	Queen Seondeok	Sejong
2010	Pink Lipstick	Maeng Ho-geol
2011	Royal Family	Kim Tae-hyuk
2011	KBS Drama Special – "The Woman from the Olle Road"	Park Chan-gook
2011	My One and Only	Na Young-ik
2011	Saving Mrs. Go Bong-shil	Seo Joon-tae
2012	Lights and Shadows	Lee Hyun-soo
2012	Here Comes Mr. Oh	Na Sang-ho
2013	KBS TV Novel – "Samsaengi"	Bong Moo-ryong
2013	7th Grade Civil Servant	Han Joo-man
2013	A Tale of Two Sisters	Ahn Tae-joon
2013	Princess Aurora	Lee Shin-sung (cameo)
2013	Bel Ami	Park Ki-suk
2014	The Noblesse	Park Kyung-joon
2014	Into the Flames	President Park Chung Hee
2014	My Dear Cat	Go Dong-joon
2015	Late Night Restaurant	Gentleman Noh (guest)
2017	Bravo My Life	Kim Ho-tae
2025	Our Golden Days	Jung Kyung-hwan

== Theater ==
Year	Title	Role
1971	Stalag 17	
2010–2011	Really Really Like You	

== Awards and nominations ==
Year	Award	Category	Nominated work	Result
1973	10th Blue Dragon Film Awards	Best New Actor	Raindrops	Nominated
1992	13th Blue Dragon Film Awards	Best Supporting Actor	White Badge	Won
1994	MBC Drama Awards	Special Award	My Mother's Sea	Won
1995	31st Baeksang Arts Awards	Most Popular Actor (Film)	Life and Death of the Hollywood Kid	Won
