= The Storys =

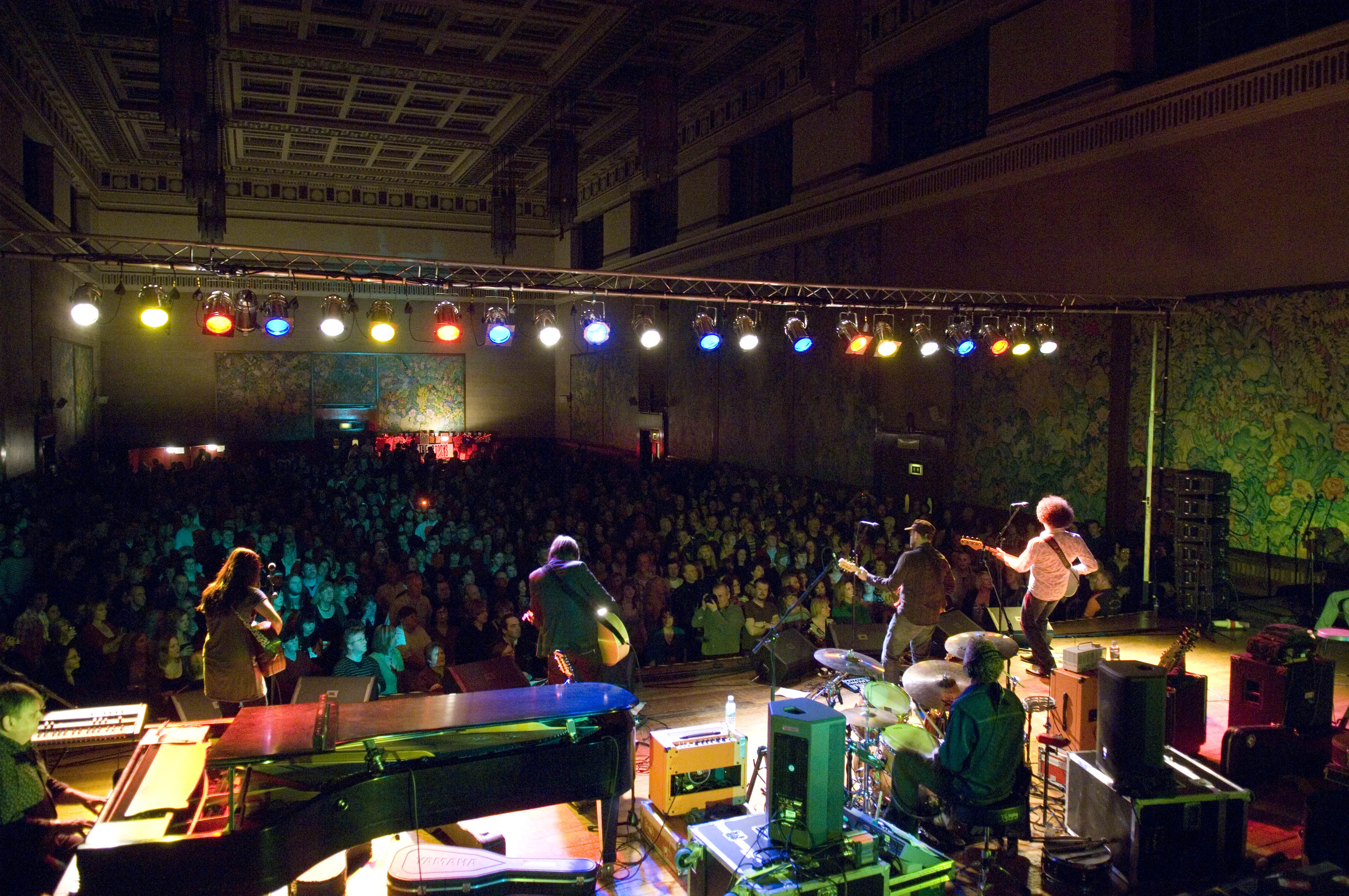
- The Storys playing at St Davids Week Festival, 2009

Background information
- Origin: Swansea, Wales
- Genres: Acoustic, country rock
- Years active: 2003–2010
- Labels: Korova, Hall Recordings
- Members: Steve Balsamo; Andy Collins; Rob Thompson; Brian Thomas; Alan Thomas
- Past members: Dai Smith
- Website: www.thestorys.co.uk

The Storys were a rock band from Swansea, Wales, active from 2003 to 2010.Their music was primarily influenced by 1970s US West Coast country rock bands.

The band's lineup included Steve Balsamo (vocals, guitar), Andy Collins (vocals, bass), Rob Thompson (vocals, guitar), Brian Thomas (drums, percussion), and Alan Thomas (keys, mandolin, banjo). Dai Smith was originally part of the band, playing guitar and contributing vocals until his departure in August 2008, after which he was replaced by Rosalie Deighton.

== Conception (2003–2006) ==
The group featured four singer-songwriters all taking lead vocals on different songs. They count as inspirations such vocal harmony-based bands as Fleetwood Mac, The Eagles, Crosby, Stills, Nash and Young and The Beatles.

They recorded their eponymous debut album The Storys in an old converted cinema in the Welsh Valleys and released the album themselves, setting up their own label – Hall Recordings – before signing a record deal with Warners and having their album re-released on Korova in March 2006.

Their first gig was to over 70,000 people at The Olympic Torch Concert outside Buckingham Palace, and was followed by a support slot with Tom Jones and a series of gigs in venues such as Bush Hall and The Borderline. The band also supported Elton John on two European tours.

== 2006–early 2008 ==
Town Beyond The Trees, the band's second album, was released in 2008 on the band's own label, Hall Recordings, after Korova folded in 2007. It was recorded in Spring 2007 at Peter Gabriel's Real World studios near Bath, UK. The album was produced by Jon Kelly (Beautiful South, Kate Bush, Deacon Blue, Paul McCartney). It received favourable reviews from such publications as Maverick Magazine, Uncut Magazine, Classic Rock Magazine, Rock 'n' Reel Magazine etc.

The band have also supported Santana (Switzerland), Celine Dion (Holland), Sinéad O'Connor (Belgium), Elton John (UK), Runrig (Germany) and Van Morrison (UK) as well as touring the UK in their own right.

== Early 2008–2010 ==
Dai Smith left the band in 2008 and was subsequently replaced by folk singer/songwriter, Rosalie Deighton.

The Storys' music was featured in the movie The Bank Job, and the band had cameo appearances in the film in the wedding scene.

The Storys announced they were to split and play one final concert at the Swansea Grand Theatre on 19 June 2010.

== Discography ==
=== Albums ===
- The Storys (March 2006), Korova (previously released August 2005, Hall Recordings)
- The Town Beyond the Trees (March 2008), Hall Recordings - UK #175

=== Singles and EPs ===
- "I Believe in Love" (2006), Korova
- "Cinnamon" (2006), Korova
- "Be By Your Side" (2006), Korova
- "Cinnamon" (2005), Hall Recordings
- 5 Track Promo Sampler (2005), Hall Recordings
- The Storys EP (2005), Hall Recordings (approx. 100 copies only)
- The Town Beyond the Trees EP (2005), Hall Recordings (60 copies only, limited edition artwork by Balsamo; 25 other copies had an old photo of Glyncorrwg printed on CD, plain plastic cover)
