= Libera Me (2000 film) =

2000 South Korean film

- Theatrical release poster
- Hangul: 리베라 메
- RR: Ribera me
- MR: Ribera me
- Directed by: Yang Yun-ho
- Written by: Yeo Ji-na
- Produced by: Hyun Chung-ryul; Hwang Jeong-wook
- Starring: Choi Min-soo; Cha Seung-won
- Cinematography: Seo Jeong-min
- Edited by: Park Soon-deok
- Music by: Lee Dong-jun
- Release date: November 11, 2000
- Running time: 107 minutes
- Country: South Korea
- Language: Korean
- Budget: US$4 million

Libera Me (Korean: 리베라 메; RR: Ribera me) is a 2000 South Korean action disaster film directed by Yang Yun-ho, starring Choi Min-soo and Cha Seung-won. It follows a mentally-unbalanced arsonist and the firefighters who struggle to stop him. The film was theatrically released on November 11, 2000.

== Plot ==
Yeo Hee-soo, who was incarcerated as a juvenile offender, is released on parole after serving a long 12-year sentence. The moment he steps out, the prison's boiler room explodes as if following a predetermined script, engulfing the gray building in flames.

Five months later, an unexplained fire breaks out at a pharmacy in the middle of Busan, claiming the life of firefighter Lee In-soo, the younger brother of the fire chief. The entire fire department is plunged into grief over the loss of their colleague, and In-soo's partner, Jo Sang-woo, is deeply shaken. In-soo had deliberately turned off his flashlight in his final moments to prevent Sang-woo from being drawn into danger, sacrificing himself.

A few days later, another fire erupts in an apartment complex. The old building is on the verge of collapse. Sang-woo throws himself into the rescue efforts with relentless determination, while his new partner, Kim Hyun-tae, senses an unsettling unease in him. The entire city is gripped by fear as the fires continue. While the police attempt to downplay the causes of the incidents, investigator Jeon Min-seong becomes convinced that all of these fires are acts of arson.

== Cast ==
- Choi Min-soo as Jo Sang-woo
- Cha Seung-won as Yeo Hee-soo
- Yoo Ji-tae as Kim Hyun-tae
- Park Sang-myun as Park Han-mo
- Jung Joon as Lee Jun-seong
- Kim Ae-ran as Seon-ah
- Kim Gyu-ri as Hyun Min-seong
- Kim Soo-ro
- Lee Ho-jae as Kim In-ho
- Park Jae-hoon
- Huh Joon-ho as Lee In-soo
- Jung Ae-ri as Jung Myung-jin
- Park Ji-mi
- Jeong Won-jung

== Production ==
The film was shot in Busan, with the support of the local government and fire department. Instead of using miniatures, it was filmed in real buildings throughout Busan using a special synthetic oil that allowed the crew to use actual fire. For a key scene involving a gas station, a life-sized set was constructed and detonated at a cost of US$250,000.

== Awards ==
2000 Blue Dragon Film Awards

- Best Visual Effects: Jeong Do-an

2001 Baeksang Arts Awards

- Grand Prize
- Best Film
- Best Actor: Choi Min-soo

2001 Chunsa Film Art Awards

- Best Cinematography: Seo Jeong-min
- Technical Award: Jeong Do-an

2001 Grand Bell Awards

- Best Cinematography: Seo Jeong-min
- Best Editing: Park Soon-deok
- Best Lighting: Shin Joon-ha
