= Gambler (album) =

Soundtrack album (Cast recording) by Eric Woolfson
- Released: 1997
- Recorded: 1996
- Genre: Rock

Eric Woolfson chronology
Gaudi (1995)	Gambler (1997)	Poe: More Tales of Mystery and Imagination (2003)

Gambler is a musical written by Eric Woolfson. It features several of his most popular songs from his earlier writing with The Alan Parsons Project. It is loosely based on the Project album The Turn of a Friendly Card, although it also contains several newly written songs as well as two songs from later albums, and doesn't include all songs from the 1980 album (as had been the case with Gaudi). The song "The Turn of a Friendly Card" is interpolated in "Green Light Means Danger" as well as "When The World Was Young". "Snake Eyes" is one of several songs that were part of the musical production, but left off the original cast album. "Golden Key" would later appear on The Alan Parsons Project That Never Was in a version sung by Woolfson.

== Plot ==
The plot, inspired by Dostoyevsky's 1866 novel The Gambler as well as Pushkin's Pique Dame, involves a young man entering the Peking Palace Casino and becoming a serious gambler in order to win the affection of a showgirl there, both of whom are being manipulated by the casino boss.

== Production ==
Gambler the musical had a world premier and was created in October 1996 at the Stadttheater in Mönchengladbach, Germany, and it ran October 1996 till June 1998, being staged 501 times. German reviews were mixed. It was staged in 1999 in Seoul, South Korea, and again in 2002 and 2008.

== Album release ==
The recording of the German cast was released as a CD in 1997 (with the subtitle "Das Geheimnis der Karten", lit. "the secret of the cards"). It is currently out of print, but is available as an official digital download. Another cast album was released from the Korean performance, with a slightly different tracklisting.

== Track listing (original release) ==
All songs written and composed by Eric Woolfson.

1. "Fanfare" (0:30)
2. "Green Light Means Danger" (7:01)
3. "Love In The Third Degree" (4:14)
4. "When The World Was Young" (6:14)
5. "Games People Play" (5:21)
6. "The Golden Key" (4:49)
7. "Limelight" (7:11)
8. "9 x 9 x 9" (4:40)
9. "Halfway" (5:10)
10. "Eye in the Sky" (9:01)
11. "(You'll be) Far Away" (4:21)
12. "Time" (7:19)
13. "Medley" (0:55)
14. "Afterture" (7:30) (bonus track to the download version)
