= Life and Death of the Hollywood Kid =

1994 film

- Film poster
- Directed by: Chung Ji-young
- Screenplay by: Chung Ji-young; Shim Seung-bo
- Based on: The Life of the Hollywood Kid by Ahn Junghyo
- Produced by: Ahn Dong-gyu; Yoo In-taek
- Starring: Choi Min-su
- Cinematography: Shin Ok-hyun
- Edited by: Park Sun-duk
- Music by: Shin Byung-ha
- Production company: Ahnsworld
- Release date: 30 July 1994
- Running time: 114 minutes
- Country: South Korea
- Language: Korean

Life and Death of the Hollywood Kid (Korean: 헐리우드 키드의 생애; RR: Heolliudeu kideuui saengae) is a 1994 South Korean drama film directed by Chung Ji-young. The film was selected as the South Korean entry for the Best Foreign Language Film at the 67th Academy Awards, but was not accepted as a nominee.

== Cast ==
- Choi Min-soo as The Hollywood Kid

== See also ==
- List of submissions to the 67th Academy Awards for Best Foreign Language Film
- List of South Korean submissions for the Academy Award for Best Foreign Language Film
