= Poe: More Tales of Mystery and Imagination =

Studio album by Eric Woolfson
- Released: 2003
- Recorded: 2003
- Genre: Atmospheric rock, Rock
- Length: 47:05
- Label: Sony Music Distribution
- Producer: Eric Woolfson

Eric Woolfson chronology
Gambler (1997)	Poe: More Tales of Mystery and Imagination (2003)	The Alan Parsons Project That Never Was (2009)

Professional ratings
Review scores
Source	Rating
Allmusic	(not rated)

Poe: More Tales of Mystery and Imagination is an album by Eric Woolfson. It contains some, but not all, of the songs from his musical Edgar Allan Poe.

== Track listing ==
1. "Angel of the Odd" – 2:36 - Instrumental
2. "Wings of Eagles" – 4:45 - Lead Vocals: Steve Balsamo
3. "Train to Freedom" – 4:40 - Lead Vocals: Fred Johanson
4. "Somewhere in the Audience" – 4:47 - Lead Vocals: Steve Balsamo
5. "The Bells" – 5:32 - The Choir
6. "The Pit and the Pendulum":
  1. "Part I" – 2:31 - Lead Vocals: Steve Balsamo
  2. "Part II" – 2:02 - Lead Vocals: Steve Balsamo
  3. "Part III" – 2:02 - Lead Vocals: Steve Balsamo
7. "The Murders in the Rue Morgue" – 4:35 - Lead Vocals: Eric Woolfson & Steve Balsamo
8. "Tiny Star" – 2:44 - Lead Vocals: Steve Balsamo
9. "Goodbye to All That" – 5:15 - The Choir
10. "Immortal" – 5:30 - Lead Vocals: Steve Balsamo

== Personnel ==
- Eric Woolfson – keyboards, orchestration, lead & backing vocals
- Simon Chamberlain – keyboards, orchestration
- Haydn Bendall – keyboards & sequencing
- Austin Ince – sequencing
- John Parricelli – guitar
- Laurence Cottle – bass guitar
- Dermot Crehan – Irish fiddle
- Steve Balsamo – lead and backing vocals
- Fred Johanson – lead vocals on Train To Freedom, backing vocals
- Christian Phillips, Rob Thompson, Stefan Rhys Williams – backing vocals
- Brighton Festival Chorus & The Metro Voices – Chorus on The Bells and Goodbye to All That.
- Ian Thomas – drums
- Ralph Salmins – drums, percussion
- Martin Ditcham – percussion

== CD release and stage musical version ==
The music of Poe was first released on the studio recorded CD Poe: More Tales of Mystery and Imagination, containing 10 tracks (including the 3 parts of The Pit and the Pendulum as a single track). The CD running order did not match that of the later stage show.

The stage musical version of Woolfson's Poe premiered at Abbey Road Studios in November 2003.

The musical contains seventeen songs. The seven songs which are missing from the 2003 Poe: More Tales from Mystery and Imagination CD are:

- Blinded By the Light
- The Raven
- It Doesn't Take a Genius
- The Devil I Know
- Trust Me
- Annabel Lee/Let the Sun Shine on Me
- What Fools People Are

The full complement of the musical's 18 songs is found on an expanded 2009 CD release, which is titled (like the stage musical itself) Edgar Allan Poe. This release includes the original 10 studio tracks, an orchestrated version of Tiny Star, and seven tracks taken from live concert performances. The running order of the Edgar Allan Poe CD is:

- 01. Angel of the Odd
- 02. Tiny Star
- 03. Wings of Eagles
- 04. The Murders in the Rue Morgue
- 05. Blinded by the Light
- 06. The Pit and the Pendulum
- 07. The Raven This track uses music from the original Alan Parsons Project track of the same title from their album Tales of Mystery and Imagination. It features the bass line and keyboard chords from the opening of the Alan Parson Project song. It also features a spoken reading of Poe's poem, without the use of vocoder found on the Alan Parsons Project song.
- 08. It Doesn't Take a Genius
- 09. The Bells
- 10. Goodbye to All That
- 11. The Devil I Know
- 12. Somewhere in the Audience
- 13. Trust Me
- 14. Annabel Lee/Let the Sun Shine on me
- 15. Train to Freedom
- 16. What Fools People Are
- 17. Immortal

The 2009 CD release Edgar Allan Poe effectively supersedes the 2003 Poe: More Tales of Mystery and Imagination, since it contains all of the earlier tracks plus additional ones.
