= The Alan Parsons Project That Never Was =

Eric Woolfson sings The Alan Parsons Project That Never Was

Studio album by Eric Woolfson
- Released: April 6, 2009
- Recorded: October 2008
- Genre: Progressive rock
- Length: 42:51
- Label: Limelight Records
- Producer: Eric Woolfson

Eric Woolfson chronology
Poe: More Tales of Mystery and Imagination (2003)	Eric Woolfson sings The Alan Parsons Project That Never Was (2009)

Professional ratings
Review scores
Source	Rating
Allmusic	3.5/5 stars

Eric Woolfson sings The Alan Parsons Project That Never Was is an album by the progressive rock musician Eric Woolfson, co-creator with Alan Parsons of The Alan Parsons Project, as well as main songwriter and manager of the band. Released in 2009, this was Woolfson's final album before he died of cancer in December of that year. The album includes songs that remained unreleased since the Project time for various reasons; however, as Woolfson himself remarks in the booklet, Parsons' dislike for some of Woolfson's compositions would have often caused them to be excluded from a Project album in its very early stages - such as, for example, "Steal Your Heart Away", an "unashamedly commercial" song with a conventionally sentimental lyric, which Parsons, in Woolfson's words, would have absolutely detested. "Somewhere in the Audience" and "Immortal" are slightly re-arranged and re-recorded versions of two of Woolfson's demos for his 2003 musical about Edgar Allan Poe; the final versions of these songs, sung by the musical's protagonist Steve Balsamo, are featured on the album Poe: More Tales of Mystery and Imagination. "Train to Wuxi" was the original version of "Train to Freedom", which is also included (with different lyrics) in the Poe musical and features Woolfson's one and only guitar solo.

== Track listing ==
All songs written and composed by Eric Woolfson

1. "Golden Key" - 4:12
2. "Nothing Can Change My Mind" - 4:00
3. "Rumour Goin' Round" - 4:39
4. "Any Other Day" - 3:08
5. "I Can See Round Corners" - 5:15
6. "Steal Your Heart Away" - 3:20
7. "Along the Road Together" - 3:21
8. "Somewhere in the Audience" - 4:36
9. "Train to Wuxi" - 4:19
10. "Immortal" - 6:02

== Personnel ==
Personnel as listed on CD booklet:

- Eric Woolfson - vocals, keyboards, guitar on "Train to Wuxi"
- Richard Cottle - keyboards on "Rumour Goin' Round"
- Austin Ince - Sound engineer, programming, additional keyboards
- Ian Bairnson - guitars on "Rumour Goin' Round" and "Any Other Day"
- David Paton - bass on "Rumour Goin' Round"
- Stuart Elliott - drums on "Rumour Goin' Round"
- Gavin Greenaway - orchestral arrangements on "Golden Key"
- Czech Philharmonic Orchestra
- Haydn Bendall - Sound engineer

Notes
Bairnson, Elliott, Paton and Cottle are all former members of The Alan Parsons Project. Their parts on "Rumour Goin' Round" were recorded in 1985 during sessions for the band's album Stereotomy, as the track is an outtake from that album (the track "Any Other Day" was originally demoed in 1982 during the sessions of Eye in the Sky with the same musicians minus Cottle, but was abandoned before it could be recorded as a complete backing track; the version on this album is a completely new recording); Bairnson's guitars on "Any Other Day" were played and recorded in 2009 at his home studio in Marbella, Spain, as a personal favour to Woolfson.
