= Happy Ending (TV series) =

2012 South Korean television series

- Promotional poster
- Hangul: 해피 엔딩
- RR: Haepi ending
- MR: Haep'i ending
- Genre: Drama
- Written by: Kim Yoon-jung
- Directed by: Kwak Young-bum; Shin Yoon-sun
- Starring: Choi Min-soo; Shim Hye-jin; Lee Seung-yeon
- Country of origin: South Korea
- Original language: Korean
- No. of episodes: 24

Production
- Running time: 70 minutes
- Production company: Logos Film

Original release
- Network: JTBC
- Release: April 23 – July 16, 2012

Happy Ending (Korean: 해피 엔딩) is a 2012 South Korean television series starring Choi Min-soo, Shim Hye-jin and Lee Seung-yeon. It aired on JTBC from April 23 to July 16, 2012.

== Synopsis ==
The series revolves around Kim Doo-soo (Choi Min-soo)'s family after he learns that he is terminally ill.

== Cast ==
=== Main ===
- Choi Min-soo as Kim Doo-soo
- Shim Hye-jin as Yang Sun-ah
- Lee Seung-yeon as Hong Ae-ran

=== Supporting ===
- So Yoo-jin as Kim Geum-ha
- Kim So-eun as Kim Eun-ha
- Yeon Joon-seok as Choi Dong-ha
- Park Jung-chul as Lee Tae-pyung
- Kangta as Goo Seung-jae
- So Yi-hyun as Park Na-young
- Ha Seung-ri as Park Na-ri
- Choi Bool-am as Doo-soo's father
- In Gyo-jin as Lee Seong-hoon
- Jang Da-na as Ji-min
- Yoo Jang-young as Young-shik
- Maeng Sang-hoon as Director Oh
- Han Mi-jin as Team leader Hong
- Kang Dong-yup as Reporter Choi
- Ryu Kyung-soo as Park Jeong-ho

== Ratings ==
In this table, the blue numbers represent the lowest ratings and the red numbers represent the highest ratings.

Ep.	Original broadcast date	Average audience share (AGB Nielsen)
Ep.	Original broadcast date	Nationwide
1	April 23, 2012	1.253%
2	April 24, 2012	1.339%
3	April 30, 2012	0.805%
4	May 1, 2012	1.108%
5	May 7, 2012	1.267%
6	May 8, 2012	1.102%
7	May 14, 2012	1.505%
8	May 15, 2012	1.510%
9	May 21, 2012	1.377%
10	May 22, 2012	1.668%
11	May 28, 2012	1.311%
12	May 29, 2012	1.215%
13	June 4, 2012	1.298%
14	June 5, 2012	1.346%
15	June 11, 2012	1.100%
16	June 18, 2012	1.142%
17	June 19, 2012	1.245%
18	June 25, 2012	1.378%
19	June 26, 2012	1.056%
20	July 2, 2012	1.582%
21	July 3, 2012	1.550%
22	July 9, 2012	1.297%
23	July 10, 2012	1.320%
24	July 16, 2012	1.175%
25	July 17, 2012	1.78%
Average		1.290%

- This drama airs on a cable channel/pay TV which normally has a relatively smaller audience compared to free-to-air TV/public broadcasters (KBS, SBS, MBC and EBS).
