= Choi Min-soo =

South Korean actor (born 1962)

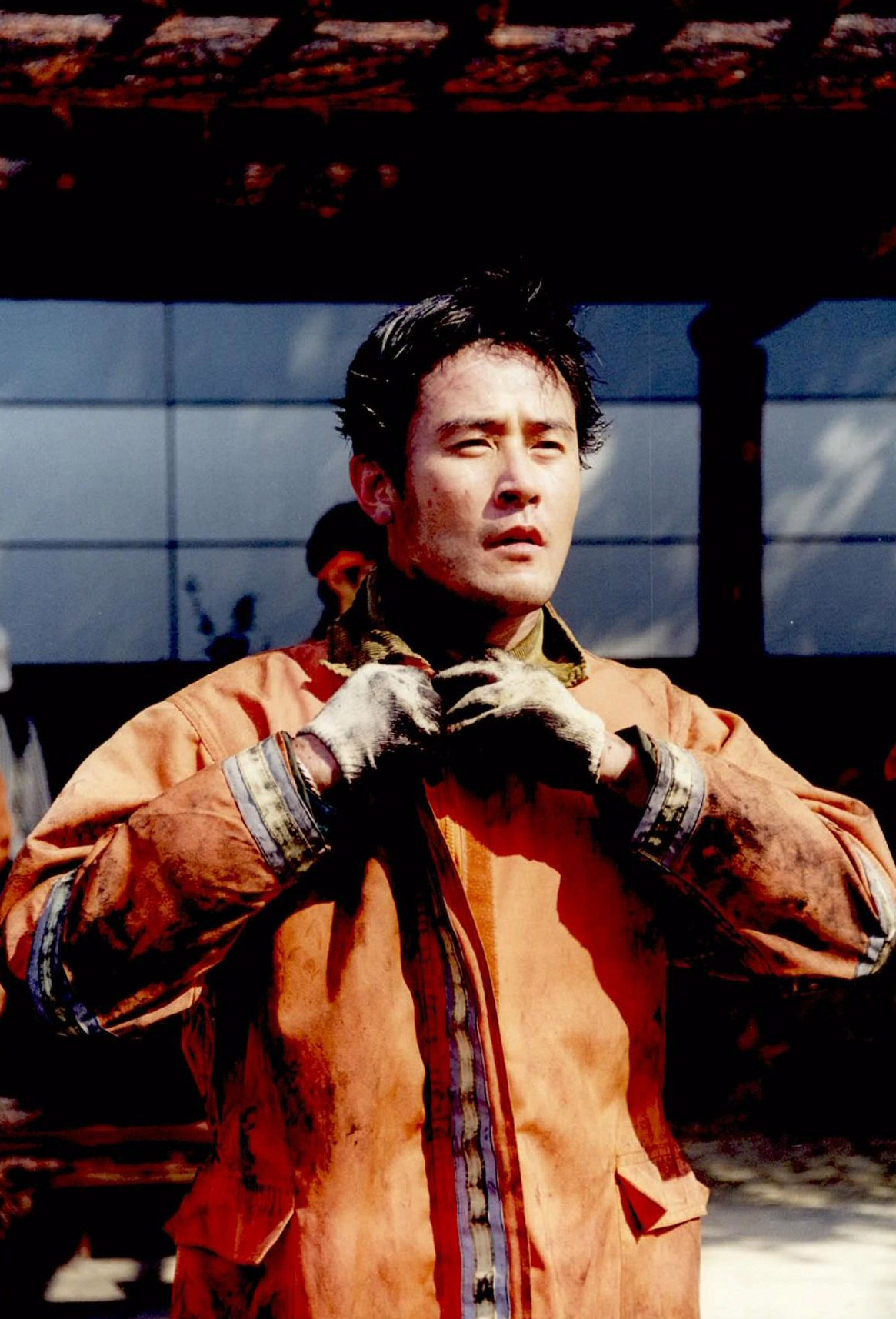
- Choi in 2000
- Born: March 27, 1962 (age 64); Jung District, Seoul, South Korea
- Education: Seoul Institute of the Arts
- Occupation: Actor
- Years active: 1985–present
- Agent: Management YUL
- Spouse: June Elizabeth Kang (m. 1994)
- Children: 2
- Parents: Choi Moo-ryong (father); Kang Hyo-shil (mother)
- Relatives: Jeon Ok (grandmother); Kang Hong-shik (grandfather)

Korean name
- Hangul: 최민수
- Hanja: 崔民秀
- RR: Choe Minsu
- MR: Ch'oe Minsu
- Website: managementyul.com

Choi Min-soo (Korean: 최민수; born March 27, 1962) is a South Korean actor. One of the leading actors in Korean film and television in the 1990s, he has received numerous accolades throughout the span of his career, including five Baeksang Art Awards, six Blue Dragon Film Awards, and three Grand Bell Awards. He is one of the only actors, alongside Lee Byung-hun, to have won in all categories of the Best Actor Award at all three of South Korea's most prestigious awards ceremonies.

Choi first garnered critical recognition in the film Nambugun: North Korean Partisan in South Korea (1990), which earned him the Blue Dragon Film Award for Best Supporting Actor. He would gain mainstream popularity with his appearances in the television series What Is Love (1991) and the film The Marriage Life (1992). His role in the television series Walking Up to Heaven (1993) would solidify his public image as a "tough guy". For his performance in The Terrorist (1995), he won his first Blue Dragon Film Award for Best Actor and fourth Popular Star Award. That same year, he received the Baeksang Arts Award for Best Actor for Sandglass (1995).

Choi then made a shift to more television roles, appearing in the historical fantasy series The Legend (2007), which was a ratings success. Since then, he has appeared in television series Happy Ending (2012), Man Who Dies to Live (2017), Lawless Lawyer (2018), and Numbers (2023).

== Early life and education ==
=== Ancestry ===
Choi Min-soo was born on March 27, 1962, in Jung-gu, Seoul, South Korea to actor Choi Moo-ryong and actress Kang Hyo-shil. Choi's father was a popular actor in the 1960s and 1970s. Choi is the fourth born of three daughters and one son to his parents. He has one half-sister from his father's second marriage to actress Kim Ji-mee and a half-brother and half-sister from his father's third marriage.

Choi is a third generation actor from a family of actors. In addition to his parents, both of his maternal grandparents were actors. His grandmother is actress Jeon Ok, who was referred to as the 'Queen of Tears' for her excellence in acting in tragic dramas. His grandfather is Kang Hong-shik, who was an actor, film director, and singer active during the Japanese occupation period. Kang Hong-sik and Jeon Ok were the first married couple in the Korean entertainment industry. Choi's maternal grandparents later separated after Korea's liberation from Japanese colonialism. His grandmother stayed in South Korea with their daughter (Choi's mother), while his grandfather went over to North Korea with their other daughter Kang Hyo-son, who later became an actress in North Korea.

=== Education ===
Choi graduated from Lila Elementary School, Seongdong Middle School, Dongbuk High School, and the Seoul Institute of the Arts with an associate degree in Broadcasting and Entertainment.

== Career ==
=== 1986–1989: Career beginnings ===
After graduating from the Seoul Institute of the Arts, he debuted in 1986 in the film Son of God, playing the lead role. He then made his television debut in the KBS drama Skewers in 1987. He would continue to play lead roles in films.

=== 1990–1995: Rising popularity and breakthrough ===
In 1990, he began to gain attention after playing poet Kim Young in the film Nambugun: North Korean Partisan in South Korea. His performance won him various rookie acting awards. He would continue to establish his popularity as an actor with lead roles in the MBC dramas Humble Men and A Mob House in 1991. It would be his role in the drama What Is Love and the film The Marriage Life that would solidify his status as a top star. During this time, Choi had a "tough guy" image from his debut role in Son of God, but the works that had garnered him mainstream popularity were comedy-orientated. He appeared in such comedy-orientated projects until around 1993. It was his role as a tough gangster in the 1993 drama Walking Up to Heaven that would cement his image as a "tough guy".

Choi went on to star in the romance films A Good Day to Fall in Love and My Old Sweetheart in 1995. His success would continue with his roles in the film The Terrorist and the drama Sandglass, winning him various prestigious acting awards.

=== 1996–2006: Steady work and international roles ===
In 1996, he portrayed a psychopathic serial killer in the film Piano Man, which garnered moderate attention. Choi would continue to receive steady work, with some of his acting projects consisting of the films Blackjack in 1997 and Phantom, The Submarine in 1999. In 2000, he starred in the film Love Bakery, which received positive reviews, but performed poorly at the box office. In 2003, he starred in the drama South of the Sun, showing a different side to his "tough guy" image. In 2005, he starred in the film Holiday.

During this time, Choi had roles in films outside of South Korea. In 2002, he starred in his first foreign project in the Japanese film Seoul, directed by Masahiko Nagasawa. In 2005, he portrayed General Choi in director Stanley Tong's Hong Kong film, The Myth, alongside Jackie Chan.

=== 2007–present: Deviation from film and transition into more television roles ===
After 2006, Choi would begin to accept more television roles and appear less in film roles. In 2007, he starred in the historical fantasy series The Legend, which achieved high television ratings. His role in the drama won him an award and multiple nominations at the year end MBC Drama Awards.

After taking a nearly two year hiatus from acting due to his elderly assault scandal, Choi made his comeback in the SBS drama Father's House in 2009. His comeback was a success, achieving high viewership ratings and positive reception from viewers.

In 2011, Choi made his American film debut in Serpent Rising. This marked his return to the big screen for the first time in 5 years.

In 2012, Choi reunited with his The Marriage Life co-star Shim Hye-jin in the drama Happy Ending. He received praise for his acting, showcasing his dramatic and emotional acting skills in the drama. That same year, he made a cameo in episode 4 of the drama Faith, starring Lee Min-ho and Kim Hee-sun.

In 2014, he appeared in the MBC drama Pride and Prejudice as Moon Hee-man. At the end-of-year 2014 MBC Drama Awards, Choi won the Golden Acting Award for his role in Pride and Prejudice. However, he did not attend the awards ceremony and refused to receive the award. His Pride and Prejudice co-star Baek Jin-hee received the award on his behalf and delivered his speech:

I am most thankful to MBC, director Kim Jin Man, and script writer Lee Hyun Joo for giving me the opportunity to participate in such a meaningful drama despite my old age. Most of all, I would like to thank the viewers of “Pride and Prejudice” for all their love and support. I would also like to show my gratitude to our Incheon Public Security team. I'm currently living the life of a prosecutor who executes the law [through the drama]. It would only make sense for me to receive this award if I deserve it. Therefore, I am sorry to say that I most sincerely refuse this award. This is the least I can do for society's conscience and hope lost in the deep, cold sea during the times of a failing law, lack of common sense, and loss of any morsel of truth.

Choi's refusal of the award was due to his grief towards the Sewol ferry accident, which occurred on April 14 that year. The full speech was not aired due to "complications". Despite his refusal of the award, actress Baek Jin-hee stated that she would pass it on to him. That same year, he returned to the Korean big screen for the first time in 8 years with How to Steal a Dog.

In 2015, Choi ventured into regular variety show appearances for the first time. He was cast as a regular member in A Look At Myself, partnering up with F.T. Island member Lee Hong-gi as his manager and accompanying him to schedules. However, after getting involved in a physical altercation with a staff member and receiving immense public backlash for his actions, Choi voluntarily stepped down from the show and apologised to viewers and all those involved. Consequently, his guest appearance on the August 29 broadcast of Immortal Songs was edited out due to the controversy.

In October 2015, Choi's wife, June Kang, was cast as a member of What Is Mom. The show was a observational reality program that followed Kang's daily domestic life as a mother. The premise of the show was to reveal the relationship between mothers and their adolescent children. Choi and his two sons made regular appearances on the show alongside Kang. Choi's family was popular with viewers and the show presented a different side to Choi's public perception, showing a more light-hearted and easy-going side to him as a family man.

In 2016, he appeared in the SBS drama The Royal Gambler as King Sukjong of Joseon.

Choi would continue to make guest appearances in many popular variety shows, such as I Can See Your Voice Season 3 in 2016, Secretly Greatly in 2017, Master in the House and Happy Together Season 4 in 2019, and My Little Old Boy and Dolsing Fourmen in 2023.

In 2017, he starred in the tvN romantic comedy series The Liar and His Lover, playing the role of Lee Hyun-woo's father, Kang In-woo. Later that year, he starred in the MBC comedy drama Man Who Dies to Live.

In 2018, he was cast in the tvN legal thriller Lawless Lawyer alongside Lee Joon-gi and Seo Yea-ji. In 2019, he and his wife appeared as regular members on the variety show Same Bed, Different Dreams 2: You Are My Destiny. In 2020, he starred in the Netflix drama Extracurricular. In 2022, his wife appeared as a cast member on the KBS2 variety show Godfather, where he made regular appearances on the show alongside his wife.

In 2023, Choi was cast as Han Je-gyun in the MBC drama Numbers alongside Kim Myung-soo and Choi Jin-hyuk. That same year, he made his big screen comeback in the film Bear Man. He also made regular appearances on the reality show With Father and Me alongside his wife.

On October 23, 2024, it was confirmed that Choi was set to appear in the upcoming MBC drama Motel California as Ji Chun-pil. The drama premiered on January 10, 2025.

== Personal life ==
=== Marriage and family ===
Choi married his wife, June Elizabeth Kang, on June 18, 1994 in Seoul, South Korea. They have two children, Christian (born 1996) and Benjamin (2001).

Kang, who was born and raised in Canada, traveled to Korea in 1993 to participate in an international Miss Korea beauty pageant as Miss Canada. Choi was there to sing for the congratulatory stage performance. Kang did not make it to the final eight but won the Friendship Award. Choi and Kang did not formally interact, but Choi noticed Kang during the pageant. About a week later, Kang received a phone call from the pageant's producer, offering to take her on a tour of the Korean network MBC before she returned to Canada. At the time, Choi was filming the MBC drama My Mother's Sea and ran into Kang by chance at the studio. They exchanged greetings and after this meeting, Choi asked Kang to coffee. After a three-hour conversation, Choi proposed to Kang. They began dating after she returned to Canada, and Choi frequently flew there to visit her. After six months of dating, the two married.

=== Physical disputes ===
In April 2008, Choi was involved in an assault case where a roadside argument escalated to physical violence, which resulted in him taking a voluntary leave from acting due to the public outcry. It was reported that an elderly man saw Choi cursing at another driver and confronted him. The situation escalated and Choi assaulted the man. The actor then attempted to drive away, but the elderly man grabbed onto the hood of his car and refused to let go. Ultimately Choi was allowed to leave when the man declined to press charges, but the public reaction was swift and condemning. The actor apologised profusely for his behavior and promised to live in exile in the mountains, away from his wife and children, for a year.

On August 19, 2015, Choi punched a free-lance producer on the set of the KBS2 variety show, A Look At Myself. It was reported that the incident occurred after the producer had warned Choi about his frequent swearing during filming. Upon hearing this, Choi punched the producer. The situation was de-esculated after production staff stepped in. After news of the physical altercation came out, Choi was again the focus of a strong public backlash. This resulted in him again voluntarily withdrawing from the program and apologising sincerely to all parties involved as well as to viewers of the show. Consequently, his guest appearance on the August 29 broadcast of Immortal Songs was excluded.

=== Aggressive driving ===
On January 31, 2019, it was reported that Choi was indicted without detention and would be going on trial for charges associated with an incident where he engaged in aggressive driving on September 17, 2018. According to Choi, he was driving in the inside lane when another driver overtook his car from the next lane over without using his indicator and then immediately hit his brakes. While the other driver acknowledged these facts, the two were at odds with each other by honking their horns to just go. Choi also claimed that the other driver made insulting comments to him.

The case first came to trial on April 12, 2019. Choi's legal representatives stated that after the other driver caused the collision, she did not take appropriate safety measures to deal with the incident and then drove away. Consequently, according to the legal representative, Choi pursued her to attempt to secure a suitable resolution to the matter and had no intentions of retaliating or causing any harm to her. Conversely, the other driver accused Choi of deliberately causing a car accident by passing her car and making a sudden stop, resulting in damages of approximately ₩4.2 million. Choi denied these accusations. The plaintiff further accused Choi of using insulting language after the accident while they were trying to determine precisely what had happened, claims which Choi's side accepted.

In the second trial, held on September 4, 2019, the Seoul Southern District Court gave Choi a six-month prison term with a suspended sentence of two years probation. The court determined that the possibility of the other driver causing a rear-end collision was low and that Choi's actions towards the driver could be seen as "an expression of derogation of character". After the trial, Choi said that while he did not agree with the outcome, he didn't intend to appeal the decision. However, on September 11, the prosecution appealed the court's ruling and consequently, the next day, the actor also filed an appeal with the court.

The appeal trial was held on December 20, 2019, and upheld the original verdict. In his final appearance outside the courtroom, Choi stated that he believed everything happens for a reason and that he would fully accept the decision and move forward positively.

== Filmography ==
=== Film ===
Note: (Note: The whole list is referenced)

Year	Title	Role	Notes	Ref.
1985	Eye		Short film	
1986	Son of God	Choi Kang-ta		
1988	Last Dance with Her	Oh Hye-suk		
1988	That Last Winter	In-tae		
1990	Nambugun: North Korean Partisan in South Korea	Kim Young		
1990	Man Market	Yeong-chun		
1990	The Winter Dream Does Not Fly	Shin Gil-woo		
1991	For Agnes	Hwang Mi-ho		
1992	The Marriage Life	Kim Tae-gyu		
1992	Mister Mama	Hyung-jun		
1993	On a Windy Day We Must Go to Apgujeong	Cho Hyun-jae		
1993	Honeymoon	Sung-hun		
1993	A Different Kind of Man	Choi Hyung-jun		
1994	Life and Death of the Hollywood Kid	Im Byung-suk		
1994	I Wish for What Is Forbidden to Me			
1994	Blue Seagull	Ha-il	Voice	
1995	A Good Day to Fall in Love	Hyung-jun	Also planner	
1995	The Terrorist	Soo-hyun		
1995	My Old Sweetheart	Young-soo		
1995	Rehearsal	Min-soo		
1996	Come to Me	Jung-suk		
1996	Piano Man	Piano Man		
1997	Inshalla	Han Seung-yeop		
1997	Story of a Man	Bong-man		
1997	Blackjack	Oh Se-geun		
1997	A Killing Story	Gae-nun	Cameo	
1999	Phantom, The Submarine	No. 202/Vice Captain		
2000	Love Bakery	Joo No-myung		
2000	Libera Me	Jo Sang-woo		
2001	My Wife Is a Gangster	Sashimi	Cameo	
2002	Seoul	Kim Yoon-chul	Japanese film	
2002	Yesterday	Goliath		
2003	Sword in the Moon	Choi Ji-hwan		
2005	The Myth	General Choi	Hong Kong film	
2005	Holiday	Kim An-suk		
2006	My Wife Is a Gangster 3	Sashimi	Cameo	
2011	Assassins' Code (aka Serpent Rising)	Karl Kim	American film	
2014	How to Steal a Dog	Homeless man		
2023	Bear Man	Lee Jeong-sik		

=== Television series ===
Year	Title	Role	Notes	Ref.
1987	Skewers			
1991	Best Theater: Moon			
1991	Humble Men	In-soo		
1991	A Mob House	Lee Soo-hyun		
1991	What is Love	Lee Dae-bal		
1993	My Mother's Sea	Lee Dong-jae		
1993	Walking Up to Heaven	Jung Jong-ho		
1995	Sandglass	Park Tae-soo		
1998	White Nights 3.98	Kwon Taek-hyeong		
2000	Legends of Love	Min-suk		
2003	South of the Sun	Kang Sung-jae		
2004	Han River Ballad	Shin Ryul		
2007	The Legend	Dae Jang-ro (Hwacheon leader)		
2009	Father's House	Kang Man-ho		
2010	Road No. 1	Yoon Sam-soo		
2011	Warrior Baek Dong-soo	Chun		
2012	Happy Ending	Kim Doo-soo		
2012	Faith	Moon Chi-hoo	Cameo (Ep. 4)	
2012	KBS Drama Special: "Do You Know Taekwondo?"	Do-hyeon's father		
2013	The Blade and Petal	Yeon Gaesomun		
2014	Pride and Prejudice	Moon Hee-man		
2016	The Royal Gambler	King Sukjong of Joseon		
2017	The Liar and His Lover	Kang In-woo		
2017	Man Who Dies to Live	Saeed Fahd Ali/Jang Dal-goo		
2018	Lawless Lawyer	Ahn Oh-joo		
2020	Extracurricular	Lee Wang-cheol		
2023	Numbers	Han Je-gyun		
2025	Motel California	Ji Chun-pil		

=== Television shows ===
Year	Title	Role	Notes	Ref.
2006	Manners Zero	Presenter		
2015	A Look at Myself	Cast member		
2015	What Is Mom	Regular appearance	Alongside wife, who was a cast member	
2019	Same Bed, Different Dreams 2: You Are My Destiny	Cast member	Ep. 81–92	
2022	Godfather	Regular appearance	Ep. 14–39; With wife	
2023	With Father and Me	Regular appearance	Alongside wife, who was a cast member	

== Ambassadorship ==
- Busan Metropolitan City Honorary Firefighter (2000)
- Public Relations Ambassador of Korean Kendo Association (2003)
- Ministry of Environment 2nd Environmental PR Delegation (2005)
- Public Relations Ambassador of the National Promotion Committee for the Goguryeo History Museum (2007)

== Awards and nominations ==
Name of the award ceremony, year presented, category, nominee of the award, and the result of the nomination (Note: The whole list is referenced)
Award ceremony	Year	Category	Nominee / Work	Result	Ref.
APAN Star Awards	2016	Top Excellence Award, Actor in a Serial Drama	The Royal Gambler	Nominated	
Baeksang Art Awards	1989	Best New Actor – Film	Last Dance with Her	Won	
Baeksang Art Awards	1992	Most Popular Actor – Television	What Is Love	Won	
Baeksang Art Awards	1993	Best Actor – Television	Walking Up to Heaven	Won	
Baeksang Art Awards	1993	Best Actor – Film	The Marriage Life	Nominated	
Baeksang Art Awards	1995	Best Actor – Television	Sandglass	Won	
Baeksang Art Awards	1996	Best Actor – Film	Terrorist	Nominated	
Baeksang Art Awards	1998	Best Actor – Film	BlackJack	Nominated	
Baeksang Art Awards	2001	Best Actor – Film	Libera Me	Won	
Blue Dragon Film Awards	1990	Best Supporting Actor	North Korean Partisan in South Korea	Won	
Blue Dragon Film Awards	1991	Best Actor	for Agnes	Nominated	
Blue Dragon Film Awards	1991	Popular Star Award	for Agnes	Won	
Blue Dragon Film Awards	1992	Best Actor	The Marriage Life	Nominated	
Blue Dragon Film Awards	1992	Popular Star Award	The Marriage Life	Won	
Blue Dragon Film Awards	1993	Popular Star Award	Choi Min-soo	Won	
Blue Dragon Film Awards	1995	Best Actor	Terrorist	Won	
Blue Dragon Film Awards	1995	Popular Star Award	Terrorist	Won	
Blue Dragon Film Awards	1999	Best Actor	Phantom: The Submarine	Nominated	
Golden Cinematography Awards	1987	Best New Actor	Long Journey & Tunnel	Won	
Golden Cinematography Awards	1996	Most Popular Actor	Choi Min-soo	Won	
Grand Bell Awards	1991	Best Supporting Actor	North Korean Partisan in South Korea	Nominated	
Grand Bell Awards	1993	Best Actor	The Marriage Life	Nominated	
Grand Bell Awards	1993	Most Popular Actor	The Marriage Life	Won	
Grand Bell Awards	1996	Best Actor	Terrorist	Won	
Grand Bell Awards	1997	Best Actor	BlackJack	Nominated	
Grand Bell Awards	2000	Best Actor	Phantom: The Submarine	Won	
KBS Drama Awards	2013	Best Supporting Actor	The Blade and Petal	Nominated	
Korea Broadcasting Awards	1995	Best TV Actor	Sandglass	Won	
Korea Drama Awards	2017	Grand Prize (Daesang)	Man Who Dies to Live	Nominated	
MBC Drama Awards	1991	Excellence Award, Actor	Humble Men, A Mob House, What is Love	Nominated	
MBC Drama Awards	1992	Excellence Award, Actor	What is Love	Won	
MBC Drama Awards	1993	Top Excellence Award, Actor	My Mother's Sea, Walking Up to Heaven	Nominated	
MBC Drama Awards	2004	Top Excellence Award, Actor	Han River Ballad	Won	
MBC Drama Awards	2007	Golden Acting Award, Actor in a Historical Drama	The Legend	Won	
MBC Drama Awards	2007	Popularity Award, Actor	The Legend	Nominated	
MBC Drama Awards	2007	Top Excellence Award, Actor	The Legend	Nominated	
MBC Drama Awards	2014	Golden Acting Award, Actor	Pride and Prejudice	Won	
MBC Drama Awards	2017	Grand Prize (Daesang)	Man Who Dies to Live	Nominated	
MBC Drama Awards	2017	Top Excellence Award, Actor in a Miniseries	Man Who Dies to Live	Nominated	
MBC Drama Awards	2023	Best Character Award	Numbers	Nominated	
SBS Drama Awards	1995	Grand Prize (Daesang)	Sandglass	Won	
SBS Drama Awards	1995	Top Excellence Award, Actor	Sandglass	Nominated	
SBS Drama Awards	1998	Top Excellence Award, Actor	White Nights 3.98	Nominated	
SBS Drama Awards	2000	Big Star Award	Legends of Love	Won	
SBS Drama Awards	2003	Top Excellence Award, Actor	South of the Sun	Nominated	
SBS Drama Awards	2003	Excellence Award, Actor in a Serial Drama	South of the Sun	Nominated	
SBS Drama Awards	2011	Grand Prize (Daesang)	Warrior Baek Dong-soo	Nominated	
SBS Drama Awards	2011	Top Excellence Award, Actor in a Special Planning Drama	Warrior Baek Dong-soo	Nominated	
SBS Drama Awards	2016	Top Excellence Award, Actor in a Serial Drama	The Royal Gambler	Nominated	
TV Journal Star of the Year	1995	Grand Prize (Daesang)	Sandglass	Won	
