= Father's House (TV series) =

2009 South Korean television miniseries

- Promotional poster
- Hangul: 아버지의 집
- RR: Abeojiui jip
- MR: Abŏjiŭi chip
- Genre: Drama; Serial
- Written by: Lee Sun-Hee
- Directed by: Kim Su-ryong
- Starring: Choi Min-soo; Moon Jeong-hee; Kim Soo-hyun
- Country of origin: South Korea
- Original language: Korean
- No. of episodes: 2

Production
- Producer: Kim Young Sup
- Production locations: Seoul, South Korea
- Running time: 2 hours Monday at 20:55 & 21:55 (KST)

Original release
- Network: SBS
- Release: December 28, 2009

Father's House (Korean: 아버지의 집; RR: Abeojiui jip) is a South Korean year-end drama special. Reruns were aired on New Year's Day.

== Plot ==
The story revolves around the life of Kang Man-ho (Choi Min-soo), who had a one-night stand with a pianist, Lee Hyun-jae (Moon Jeong-hee). But because he needed to serve some time in prison, it isn't until he gets released that he realizes he has become a father. The mother had dropped the boy off with his closest relations (a man that is like a father figure to Choi), and headed back home to the U.S. Although Man-ho doesn't feel an immediate love for his son, their bond is solidified when both survive a bus crash. After that near-death experience, he becomes determined to be a loving father.

== Cast ==
- Choi Min-soo as Kang Man-ho
- Moon Jeong-hee as Lee Hyun-jae
- Kim Soo-hyun as Kang Jae-il
  - Park Chang-ik as young Kang Jae-il
- Baek Il-seob as Kang Soo-bok
- Park Won-sook as Soon-ae
- Ahn Jung-hoon as Park Jin-woo
- Yoo Ho-jin as Mi-ae
- Kim Gyu-jin
- Jung Hye-sun
- Kang Soo-han
- Kim Sung-oh as Steven

== Episode ratings ==
Episodes	Original broadcast date	TNMS ratings	
Episodes	Original broadcast date	Nationwide	Seoul National Capital Area
1	December 28, 2009	15.4% (5th)	15.3% (5th)
2	December 28, 2009	19.5% (3rd)	19.9% (3rd)
Average		17.5%	17.6%
