= Jasper Cho =

Canadian actor (born 1986)

- Born: Jasper Taekwan Cho; February 12, 1986 (age 40); Canada
- Other name: Cho Tae-kwan
- Occupations: Actor; art director
- Spouse: Noh Hye-ri
- Children: 2
- Parent(s): Jo Ha-moon; Choi Ji-won
- Relatives: Choi Soo-jong (uncle); Ha Hee-ra (aunt)

Korean name
- Hangul: 조태관
- Hanja: 趙泰寬
- RR: Jo Taegwan
- MR: Cho T'aegwan

Jasper Taekwan Cho (born February 12, 1986) is a Canadian actor and art director based in South Korea. He gained attention through his roles in television series Descendants of the Sun (2016) and Man Who Dies to Live (2017).

== Filmography ==
=== Film ===
Year	Title	Role	Notes	Ref.
2019	The Divine Fury	Kevin		
2022	Ultimate Oppa	Moon Shi-woo	Lead	

=== Television drama ===
Year	Title	Network	Role	Notes/Ref.
2016	Descendants of the Sun	KBS2	Daniel Spencer	
2017	Man Who Dies to Live	MBC TV	Abdallah Muhammad Waliwala	
2018	My Secret Terrius	MBC TV	K	
2020	Start-Up	tvN	Alex Kwon	
2021	River Where the Moon Rises	KBS2	Wol Gwang	
2026	Undercover Miss Hong	tvN	D.K. Lee (Ep. 8-11, 13, 15)	

=== Stage ===
Year	Title	Role	Notes
2019–2020	Lucky Romance	Je Taek-hoo	Lead

=== Television show ===
Year	Title	Role	Notes
2018–2019	Poor Husband	main cast	

== Awards and nominations ==
Year	Award	Category	Nominated work	Result	Ref.
2018	MBC Entertainment Awards	Best Newcomer Award - Variety	Poor Husband	Nominated	
2019	Asia Model Awards	Best Newcomer Award - Men in Acting		Won	
