= The Terrorist (1995 film) =

- Hangul: 테러리스트
- RR: Tereoriseuteu
- MR: T'erŏrisŭt'ŭ
- Directed by: Kim Young-bin
- Written by: Kim Young-bin
- Produced by: Lim Choong-ryul
- Starring: Choi Min-soo; Lee Geung-young; Yum Jung-ah
- Cinematography: Sin Ok-hyun
- Edited by: Park Soon-duk
- Music by: Choi Kyung-sik
- Distributed by: Seon Ik Films
- Release date: May 13, 1995
- Running time: 119 minutes
- Country: South Korea
- Language: Korean

The Terrorist (Korean: 테러리스트) is a 1995 South Korean film directed by Kim Young-bin, starring Choi Min-soo as the younger brother of a police officer who becomes involved with gangsters. It became a box office hit and earned Choi Min-soo an award for best actor.

== Plot ==
Two brothers, Sa-hyun and Soo-hyun, have a close relationship. Soo-hyun is a policeman who fights for justice and Soo-hyun dreams of following in his brother's footsteps. Despite Soo-hyun's intentions, he became a gangster by accident. The tragic film deals with social issues such as family relationships and organized crime.

== Cast ==
- Choi Min-soo ... Oh Soo-hyun
- Lee Geung-young ... Oh Sa-hyun
- Yum Jung-ah ... Hwang Chae-eun
- Huh Joon-ho ... Sang-chul
- Dokgo Young-jae ... Im Tae-ho
- Park Bong-seo ... Jeong Byung-jin
- Yun Mun-sik ... Detective Moon
- Lee Ki-young ... Choon-woo
- Yoo Oh-sung ... Jeom-pyo
- Myung Gye-nam ... Detective Chief
