= His Last Gift =

- Hangul: 마지막 선물
- Hanja: 마지막 膳物
- RR: Majimak seonmul
- MR: Majimak sŏnmul
- Directed by: Kim Yeong-joon
- Written by: Bom Ee-hwan; Kim Tae-kwan; Kim Seon-mi
- Produced by: Jeong Tae-won; Jo Seon-mook; Kim Jong-hyeon
- Starring: Shin Hyun-joon; Huh Joon-ho
- Cinematography: Lee Sung-jae
- Edited by: Nam Na-yeong
- Production companies: Taewon Entertainment; Olive Nine
- Distributed by: Showbox
- Release date: 5 February 2008
- Running time: 105 minutes
- Country: South Korea
- Language: Korean
- Box office: US$1,857,015

His Last Gift (Korean: 마지막 선물; also known as Last Present) is a 2008 South Korean film.

== Plot ==
Tae-joo, a murderer serving a life sentence in prison, is given a temporary release to save the life of a seriously ill young girl, Se-hee, who suffers from Wilson's disease and desperately needs a liver transplant. Se-hee is the daughter of Yeong-woo, an old friend of Tae-joo's who is now a police officer. Upon discovering that Se-hee's now deceased mother was his ex-wife, Tae-joo realises that he is in fact her biological father, and does everything he can to try and save her life.

== Cast ==
- Shin Hyun-joon as Kang Tae-joo
- Huh Joon-ho as Jo Yeong-woo
- Jo Soo-min as Jo Se-hee
- Kwon Oh-joong as Dong-hyeon
- Kim Sang-ho as Yong-tae
- Jo Won-hee as Cheol-goo
- Bang Hyeob as Kang Tae-joo
- Choi Seong-ho as Jo Yeong-woo
- Ha Ji-won as Min Hye-yeong
- Kim Hyeon-ah as Ha-jin
- Kim Ik-tae as Taxi driver
- Cho Jin-woong as Baek In-cheol
- Park Min-jung as Bar woman
- Lee Sang-hong as Scamp
- Park So-yeon
- Gi Ju-bong as Class monitor (cameo)
- Kim Myeong-gook as Jo Yeong-woo's brother (cameo)

== Release ==
Prior to the release of the film, actors Shin Hyun-joon and Huh Joon-ho staged a charity concert in Seoul, intended to reflect on the main themes of the film. The concert was held on 24 January 2008, at the Melon-X concert hall, and featured performances from K-pop artists Baek Ji-young and KCM, as well as actress Choi Ji-woo. Admission to the concert was free, with voluntary donations being made to the KBS TV charity program "Love Request".

His Last Gift was released in South Korea on February 5, 2008, and was ranked fifth at the box office on its opening weekend, grossing $983,555. By 2 March it had grossed a total of $1,857,015, and as of 10 February the total number of tickets sold was 228,120.
