= Man Who Dies to Live =

2017 South Korean television series

- Promotional poster
- Hangul: 죽어야 사는 남자
- RR: Jugeoya saneun namja
- MR: Chugŏya sanŭn namja
- Genre: Comedy; Drama
- Created by: Kim Kyung-hee
- Written by: Kim Sun-hee
- Directed by: Go Dong-sun
- Creative directors: Park Bo-ram; Kim Ji-yun
- Starring: Choi Min-soo; Kang Ye-won; Shin Sung-rok; Lee So-yeon
- Country of origin: South Korea
- Original language: Korean
- No. of episodes: 24

Production
- Producer: Kim Un-ho
- Production locations: South Korea; UAE
- Camera setup: Single-camera
- Running time: 35 mins
- Production company: Doremi Entertainment

Original release
- Network: MBC TV
- Release: July 19 – August 24, 2017

Man Who Dies to Live (Korean: 죽어야 사는 남자; RR: Jugeoya saneun namja) is a South Korean television series starring Choi Min-soo, Kang Ye-won, and Shin Sung-rok. The series aired two consecutive episodes on MBC every Wednesday and Thursday at 22:00 (KST), from July 19 to August 24, 2017.

== Synopsis ==
Count Saeed Fahd Ali is a wealthy man of Korean descent living in the fictional kingdom of Bodoantia, located within the Mideast. He discovers he has a 35-year-old daughter back in South Korea, where he was known as Jang Dal-koo. Ali returns to Korea to meet his daughter, instructing his servant, Abdallah Muhammad Waliwala, to research her.

In Korea, Kang Ho-rim is a banker down on his luck, as the worst performer in the worst division of the bank. He is married to a woman named Lee Ji-young, and the two of them have a daughter named Eun-bi. Unbeknownst to Lee, Kang is having an affair with a woman whose name is also Lee Ji-young.

Abdallah hires a detective agency consisting of Detective Han and Miss Yang. Han presents Abdallah with two flash drives: One containing information on Ali's daughter and her family, and the other containing information on Kang's affair. Abdallah refuses the latter, taking only the former flash drive, but as fate would have it, the flash drives were switched, and Abdallah drives away with photos of Kang and his mistress.

Because both women share the same name and are the same age, the switch confuses Abdallah and Ali into believing the wrong woman is Ali's daughter.

The cast list refers to the two Lee Ji-youngs as "A" (Ali's daughter) and "B" (Kang's mistress) respectively to differentiate the two.

Meanwhile, Lee "A" has been writing drama scripts for many years while she works at a doctor's office. After years of rejections, she finally lands a meeting with a drama production company to review her script. Lee "B" is the producer in charge of reviewing scripts, but since Lee "A" submitted it under the wrong name by accident, Lee "B" does not initially notice that they share the same name.

Abdallah convinces Ali to start by getting familiar with someone close to Lee rather than confronting her directly. Ali decides to meet Kang and promises to invest a great deal of money with his bank, turning Kang into a celebrity at work.

Kang believes Ali is correct, and thinks that Ali's daughter is not his wife, but his mistress. However, he allows Ali to believe that he is married to Lee "B". The deception is time-consuming, however, and weighs heavily on Kang. He drinks himself into a stupor, and Lee "A" gets upset with him for not coming home.

Lee "A' goes to a night club with her boss, Wang Mi-ran. Ali is struck with a vision while praying and, following it, attends the same club. Wang takes an interest in Ali, and she tricks him into revealing that he is Korean.

== Cast ==
=== Main ===
- Choi Min-soo as Count Saeed Fahd Ali / Jang Dal-koo
  - Choi Yoo-sung as young Dal-koo
- Kang Ye-won as Lee Ji-young "A"
- Shin Sung-rok as Kang Ho-rim
- Lee So-yeon as Lee Ji-young "B"

=== Supporting ===
==== People around the Count ====
- Jasper Cho as Abdallah Muhammad Waliwala
- Kim Byeong-ok as Detective agency manager Han
- Hwang Seung-eon as Yang Yang (Yang Mi-hwa)

==== People around Lee Ji-young "A" ====
- Bae Hae-sun as Wang Mi Ran
- Go Bi-joo as Kang Eun-bi

==== People around Kang Ho-rim ====
- Jo Kyung-sook as Nah Ok-ja
- Cha Soon-bae as Choi Byung-tae

=== Extended ===
- Lee Tae-yun as Kang Hye-rim
- Jo Young-hoon as Sang-duk
- Kang Sang-won as Soo-hyuk
- Seo Hye-won as Min-hee
- Kim Soo-hyun as Director
- Lee Gun-hee as Sung-ho
- Ha Eun-jin as Lee Kyung-sook
- Jo Hye-in
- Oh Tae-ha
- Oh Ki-hwan
- Do-hyun
- Choi Jin-soo
- Lee Sang-bo
- Noh Yoon-jung
- Han Ji-eun
- Kim Eun-jin
- Kang Eun-hee
- Jo Ye-jin
- Chae Min-ji
- Seo Na-young
- Kim Gun-young
- Lee Jae-ho
- Kook Jung-sook
- Seo Yi-soo
- Kim Dae-gun
- Jo Yoo-sung

== Reception ==
The series was met with an online backlash and requests to boycott it from Arabs and Muslims, who alleged that the series contains inaccurate and insulting depictions of Muslim culture. The alleged scenes showed woman wearing a hijab and bikinis while laying next to a swimming pool, and the main character drinking wine for breakfast. Moreover, the poster portrayed the main character placing his foot next to the Quran.

MBC has since released an official apology in Korean, English, and Arabic, and stated at the beginning of episode 5 that they have removed the controversial scenes from all services of IPTV and VOD, stressing that Bodoantia is a fictional kingdom. The apology extends into the series canon, as episode 5 begins with Count Saeed Fahd Ali speaking directly to the audience over Arabic subtitles about the reverence that he has for Muslim culture.

Despite the controversy, the first 2 back-to-back episodes topped ratings in its timeslot as well as popularity charts in South Korea.

== Ratings ==
In the table below, the blue numbers represent the lowest ratings and the red numbers represent the highest ratings.

Episode #	Date	Average audience share			
Episode #	Date	TNmS Ratings		AGB Nielsen	
Episode #	Date	Nationwide	Seoul National Capital Area	Nationwide	Seoul National Capital Area
1	July 19, 2017	9.8% (10th)	11.0% (4th)	9.1% (8th)	10.3% (5th)
2	July 19, 2017	10.5% (9th)	11.3% (5th)	9.1% (8th)	10.4% (4th)
3	July 20, 2017	9.7% (12th)	11.0% (5th)	8.6% (9th)	9.5% (7th)
4	July 20, 2017	10.0% (10th)	11.2% (4th)	9.6% (7th)	10.5% (5th)
5	July 26, 2017	9.5% (11th)	10.1% (5th)	8.1% (10th)	9.2% (5th)
6	July 26, 2017	10.7% (7th)	10.8% (4th)	9.4% (8th)	10.6% (4th)
7	July 27, 2017	8.2% (16th)	8.9% (11th)	8.0% (12th)	9.2% (7th)
8	July 27, 2017	8.9% (14th)	10.1% (8th)	9.2% (8th)	10.3% (5th)
9	August 2, 2017	8.1% (12th)	9.3% (7th)	7.4% (15th)	8.6% (8th)
10	August 2, 2017	9.4% (8th)	10.8% (4th)	9.6% (6th)	10.9% (4th)
11	August 3, 2017	7.4% (17th)	8.1% (12th)	8.7% (12th)	9.9% (6th)
12	August 3, 2017	8.5% (12th)	9.9% (5th)	9.6% (6th)	11.0% (4th)
13	August 9, 2017	8.4% (14th)	7.2% (14th)	8.0% (13th)	8.9% (7th)
14	August 9, 2017	10.1% (10th)	9.7% (7th)	11.2% (4th)	12.5% (4th)
15	August 10, 2017	10.4% (10th)	10.5% (8th)	11.1% (5th)	12.6% (5th)
16	August 10, 2017	12.4% (5th)	12.9% (4th)	12.9% (4th)	14.1% (4th)
17	August 16, 2017	10.4% (9th)	11.0% (5th)	10.7% (6th)	11.7% (5th)
18	August 16, 2017	11.7% (5th)	12.7% (4th)	12.8% (4th)	14.1% (4th)
19	August 17, 2017	9.3% (14th)	9.9% (7th)	11.4% ((6th)	12.8% ((5th)
20	August 17, 2017	10.8% (9th)	11.4% (5th)	13.5% (4th)	15.2% (3rd)
21	August 23, 2017	9.4% (11th)	9.9% (7th)	10.7% (9th)	12.2% (5th)
22	August 23, 2017	10.8% (8th)	11.8% (4th)	12.8% (4th)	14.1% (4th)
23	August 24, 2017	9.5% (13th)	10.2% (9th)	12.0% (5th)	13.1% (5th)
24	August 24, 2017	10.7% (9th)	11.5% (4th)	14.0% (4th)	15.1% (3rd)
Average		9.8%	10.5%	10.3%	11.5%
