= Chung Ji-young =

South Korean film director and screenwriter

- Chung in 2019
- Born: November 19, 1946 (age 79); Cheongju, North Chungcheong Province, South Korea
- Education: Dongguk University; Korea University
- Occupations: Film director, screenwriter
- Years active: 1976-present

Korean name
- Hangul: 정지영
- Hanja: 鄭智泳
- RR: Jeong Jiyeong
- MR: Chŏng Chiyŏng

Chung Ji-young (born November 19, 1946) is a South Korean film director and screenwriter. Among his most well-known films are North Korean Partisan in South Korea (1990), White Badge (1992), Life and Death of the Hollywood Kid (1994), Unbowed (2012), and Black Money (2019).

== Career ==
Chung Ji-young honed his directing skills by working as an assistant director to legendary filmmaker Kim Soo-yong. Chung, whose feature debut was an erotic mystery, The Mist Whispers Like a Woman (1982), also directed about 20 episodes of the MBC single-episode anthology drama series Best Theater. He spent the majority of the 1980s directing melodramatic fare before moving on to more politically-charged works following the end of the Chun Doo-hwan administration. During his heyday, Chung helmed some of the most hard-hitting and socially conscious films of the 1980s and 1990s such as North Korean Partisan in South Korea (1990), White Badge (1992), and Life and Death of the Hollywood Kid (1994). But his influence on the industry extended far beyond his filmography, as he was also a fierce advocate for governmental reform, particularly as it affected the Korean film industry. As a leading voice in the Chungmuro filmmaking community, he argued for the establishment of a screen quota system, the abolishment of the pre-censorship system, campaigned against direct distribution of foreign movies, and was opposed to the signing of the Korea-USA free trade agreement, among other issues confronting the industry at the time.

However, following Naked Being (1998), Chung took an extended hiatus that finally ended thirteen years later when he returned with Unbowed at the 2011 Busan International Film Festival. A critique of corruption in the judicial system inspired by the real-life case of a math professor who fired a crossbow at a judge, the film caused a sensation subsequent to its commercial release in January 2012. Aside from the enormous critical acclaim it received, the ₩1.5 billion low-budget production was an unexpected box office success, drawing some 3.4 million viewers. And Chung was awarded Best Director at the 33rd Blue Dragon Film Awards.

Later in 2012 he again turned to another politically sensitive, controversial topic for his next film. National Security is based on the true story of Kim Geun-tae, a democracy activist who was kidnapped and tortured by the Chun Doo-hwan regime over 22 days within the walls of Room 515 in the anti-communism division of the National Police Headquarters in Seoul's Namyeong neighborhood circa 1985 (from which the film's Korean title Namyeong-dong 1985 is derived). Boldly opting to spend 90% of its running time on the waterboarding and other acts of horrific torture inflicted on Kim (who subsequently became Korea's Minister of Health and Welfare), Chung's film was uncompromising and challenging. By the director's own admission, he found it difficult to shoot the most trying scenes. Though it focused almost exclusively on the torture itself, many viewers have found the film to be tremendously moving in the end, and Chung hoped that the film will be a reminder of the sacrifices that some endured in order for Korea to progress to its present state.

Chung appeared in Heo Chul's documentary Ari Ari the Korean Cinema, in which he and actress Yoon Jin-seo interviewed more than a hundred respected film professionals to discuss the industry's history and the issues it currently faces. Chung originally began the project as its co-director, but when his film Unbowed was green-lighted, he turned over the final editing to his collaborator, the US-trained director and professor Heo Chul. As a veteran director, it was Chung's connections in the film industry that helped the documentary to assemble its impressive cast, which includes directors Lee Chang-dong, Im Kwon-taek, Bong Joon-ho, and Park Chan-wook; and actors Ahn Sung-ki, Park Joong-hoon, Song Kang-ho, and Choi Min-sik; as well as producers, critics, and other industry figures. In the film, Chung questions why major film companies in the country prefer working with up-and-coming directors ― it turns out it is because it is easier for the companies to take control over the products ― and how challenging it is for older directors like himself to produce the kind of movies that they want to make. He also openly criticizes the current film distribution system which he thinks makes it difficult for independent or small-budget films to secure screens.

He was the recipient of the Kim Dae-jung Nobel Peace Film Award at the 2012 Gwangju International Film Festival. Chung said he believes "there's still a lot of passion in this industry, and that’s what keeps the diversity of Korean cinema against the dominance of the major production houses." When asked why he keeps poking at sensitive areas of politics and society, Chung answered, "I wouldn’t do it if younger directors tackled this kind of topic. I'm only doing it because they aren’t saying what needs to be said. I decided that if making a film like this requires courage, I was going to show that courage."

In September 2025, Chung was honored with Korean Film Achievement Award at the 30th Busan International Film Festival.

== Filmography ==
- My Name (2026) - director, screenplay
- The Boys (2022) - director
- Black Money (2019) - director
- Project Cheonan Ship (2013) - producer
- Lee Heon's Odyssey (short film in A Journey with Korean Masters, 2013) - director
- Ari Ari the Korean Cinema (2012) - actor
- National Security (2012) - director, screenplay
- Unbowed (2012) - director, screenplay, producer
- Iri (2008) - cameo
- Extra (1998) - cameo
- Naked Being (1998) - director, cameo
- Blackjack (1997) - director
- 7 Reasons Why Beer Is Better Than a Lover (1996) - director
- Life and Death of the Hollywood Kid (1994) - director, adaptation
- Sun of Fire (1994) - cameo
- White Badge (1992) - director, adaptation
- Beyond the Mountain (1991) - director, adaptation
- North Korean Partisan in South Korea (1990) - director, producer
- Mountain Snake (1988) - director
- A Forest Where a Woman Breathes (1988) - director, screenplay
- A Woman on the Verge (1987) - director, cameo
- A Street Musician (1987) - director, screenplay
- The Light of Recollection (1984) - director
- Mrs. Kim Ma-ri (1983) - cameo
- The Mist Whispers Like a Woman (1982) - director, screenplay
- A Woman's Trap (1982) - screenplay
- Bird That Cries At Night (1982) - screenplay
- White Smile (1980) - screenplay
- Flower Woman (1979) - screenplay
- The Terms of Love (1979) - assistant director
- The Sound of Laughter (1978) - assistant director
- The Swamp of Exile (1978) - assistant director
- A Splendid Outing (1977) - assistant director
- Scissors, Rock, and Wrap (1976) - assistant director
