= National Security (2012 film) =

- Promotional poster for National Security
- Hangul: 남영동 1985
- Hanja: 南營洞 1985
- RR: Namyeongdong 1985
- MR: Namyŏngdong 1985
- Directed by: Chung Ji-young
- Written by: Lee Dae-il; Jeong Sang-hyeop; Kang Min-hee
- Produced by: Kim Ji-yeon
- Starring: Park Won-sang; Lee Geung-young
- Cinematography: Seo Min-soo
- Edited by: Ko Im-pyo
- Music by: Shin Min
- Production company: Aura Pictures
- Distributed by: Megabox; Cinus
- Release dates: October 6, 2012 (BIFF); November 22, 2012 (South Korea)
- Running time: 106 minutes
- Country: South Korea
- Language: Korean
- Box office: US$2.2 million

National Security (Korean: 남영동 1985; RR: Namyeongdong 1985) is a 2012 South Korean biographical drama film based on the memoir by Kim Geun-tae, a democracy activist who was kidnapped and tortured by national police inspector Lee Geun-an for 22 days in 1985 during the Chun Doo-hwan regime.

Calling the film "the most painful experience in my 30 years as a filmmaker," director Chung Ji-young wanted the audience to reflect on the theme of torture. He said he found the courage to make the film so that Korean viewers will "engage with our sad history and the sacrifices of great people like Kim Geun-tae in a concrete, meaningful way. If we triumph over the past, we can move forward with unity and reconciliation."

== Plot ==
September 4, 1985. Kim Jong-tae (Park Won-sang), 37, a prominent activist against the military dictatorship of Chun Doo-hwan and onetime commissioner of the Youth Federation for Democracy, is arrested and taken to a special interrogation facility in Namyeong-dong, a district in the center of Seoul synonymous with political torture in the 1970s and 80s because it was the location of the Korean Central Intelligence Agency (KCIA). During the first three days he is allowed no food or sleep and told to write an exhaustive essay on his life to date. On the fourth day, in order to find out why he resigned from the YFD, head interrogator Park Nam-eun (Myung Gye-nam) starts water torture, and on the next day waterboarding. On the sixth day, torture specialist Lee Du-han, known as "The Undertaker" (Lee Geung-young), starts a deadlier form of water torture, trying to get Jong-tae to admit he is a communist in league with North Korea. By the 11th day Jong-tae writes whatever they want him to, but Lee says it's full of inconsistencies and unusable in a court of law. The next day, after finding Jong-tae tried to smuggle out a note to his wife (Woo Hee-jin), Lee resumes a more painful version of water torture, as well as electric shocks.

== Cast ==
- Park Won-sang - Kim Jong-tae
- Lee Geung-young - Lee Du-han, "The Undertaker"
- Myung Gye-nam - Park Nam-eun
- Kim Eui-sung - Kang Su-hyeon
- Seo Dong-soo - Section chief Baek
- Lee Chun-hee - Section chief Kim
- Kim Jung-gi - Section chief Lee
- Moon Sung-keun - Director Yoon
- Woo Hee-jin - In Jae-eun, Jong-tae's wife

== Reception ==
Many had strong reactions to the film, some even choosing to leave theaters during its screenings at the 17th Busan International Film Festival.

Though it was very strongly reviewed with many critics calling it one of the best Korean films of 2012, its subject matter is believed to have intimidated many viewers, resulting in low box office returns. Director Chung Ji-young said, "It's a low-budget movie, so there wasn't a lot for publicity and marketing, and I think there are limits to its popular appeal. But I also think those 300,000 people went out of their way to see the movie. That's a truly meaningful number for us."
