= The Marines Who Never Returned =

- Poster for The Marines Who Never Returned (1963)
- Hangul: 돌아오지 않는 해병
- Hanja: 돌아오지 않는 海兵
- RR: Doraoji anneun haebyeong
- MR: Toraoji annŭn haebyŏng
- Directed by: Lee Man-hee
- Written by: Jang Guk-jin
- Produced by: Won Seon
- Starring: Jang Dong-hwi; Choi Moo-ryong; Koo Bong-seo; Lee Dae-yup; Kim Won-ha; Jeon Gye-hyeon; Kang Mi-ae; Jeon Young-sun
- Cinematography: Seo Jeong-min
- Edited by: Kim Hee-su
- Music by: Jeon Jong-kun
- Distributed by: Dae Won Films
- Release date: April 11, 1963
- Running time: 110 minutes
- Country: South Korea
- Language: Korean

The Marines Who Never Returned (Korean: 돌아오지 않는 해병; RR: Doraoji anneun haebyeong), also known as Marines Are Gone, is a 1963 South Korean war film directed by Lee Man-hee. It was released in the U.S. in 1966 as Marine Battleground. For this film, Lee was given the Best Director award at the third Grand Bell Awards ceremony in 1964. The film was also given the awards for Best Sound and Best Cinematography.

== Synopsis ==
During the Korean War, a squad of Marines from the South battle Chinese forces in the North, and are killed off one by one. At the beginning of the film, a young girl Young-hui and her mother desperately try to run for their lives from the Chinese soldiers. The girl's mother is shot dead but soldiers rescue Young-Hui in time and they immediately hide her from their higher-ranking commanders. Young-Hui is then instructed to continue hiding when she is delivered to their camp, out of fear that the general will send her to an orphanage.

The first half of the film centers on the Marines focusing on entertainment and looking after the young girl to alleviate the burden of the war. Afterwards, the Marines depart Young-Hui and head to the mountains to go into heated combat to confront the People's Volunteer Army.

== Cast ==
- Jang Dong-hwi
- Choi Moo-ryong
- Koo Bong-seo
- Lee Dae-yup
- Kim Won-ha
- Jeon Gye-hyeon
- Kang Mi-ae
- Jeon Young-sun

== Bibliography ==
- Hartzell, Adam. "The Marines Who Never Returned (1963)". www.koreanfilm.org.
- "돌아오지 않는 해병 Marines Are Gone, 1963" (in Korean). Cine21.
- "Marines Are Gone ( Dora-oji Anneun Haebyeong )(1963)". KMDb Korean Movie Database.
- Toraoji annun haebyong (1963) at IMDb
