= Choi Moo-ryong =

South Korean actor and filmmaker (1928–1999)

- Portrait of Choi
- Born: February 25, 1928; Gwangju, Keiki Province, Korea, Empire of Japan
- Died: November 11, 1999 (aged 71); Bucheon, South Korea
- Occupation: Actor
- Years active: 1954–1987

Korean name
- Hangul: 최무룡
- Hanja: 崔戊龍
- RR: Choe Muryong
- MR: Ch'oe Muryong

Choi Moo-ryong (Korean: 최무룡; Hanja: 崔戊龍; February 25, 1928 – November 11, 1999) was a South Korean actor, producer, and director. He was the father of Choi Min-soo.

== Biography ==
Choi was born in Paju, Keiki Province, Korea, Empire of Japan (now in Gyeonggi Province, South Korea). Choi was one of popular actors of the 1960s along with Shin Young-kyun and Kim Jin-kyu. Choi gained a popularity for his handsome appearance and masculine image. Choi's personal life was as much dramatic as his starred films, so he always garnered the public attention. 1952, Choi married a colleague actress, Kang Hyo-shil, the daughter of a noted actress, Jeon Ok with the nickname, "Queen of Tears" and a singer Gang Hong-sik. Choi and his wife had one son and four daughters including an actor, Choi Min-soo. However, Choi had an affair with Kim Ji-mee, the best popular actress at that time, so that Choi and Gang divorced in 1962. Choi soon married Kim Ji-mee, but he owed massive debts due to his failed film production. As a result, Choi chose to divorce Kim again in 1969. At that time, the phrase, Because I love you, I have to part from her was circulated among the public.

== Filmography ==
*Note; the whole list is referenced.

Year	English title	Korean title	Romanization	Role	Director
1987	Prince Yeon-san		Yeonsangun		
1986	The Liberal Wife 2		Jayubuin 2		
1981	Liberal Wife '81		Ja-yubu-in '81		
1976	Common Woman		Botong-yeoja		
1975	Violent Shaking		Gyeogdong		
1975	A Little Star		Jag-eun byeol		
1973	An Eccentric General and His Inferiors All Over the Country		Byeolnan janggungwa paldobuha		
1973	Azaleas in My Home		Gohyang-e jindallae		
1973	Sister		Nuna		
1973	Weeds		Jabcho		
1973	Special Investigation Bureau : Kim So-San, the Kisaeng		Teugbyeolsusabonbu-wa gisaeng Gim Sosan		
1973	A Companion		Dongbanja		
1973	A Case of a College Girl Lee Nan-Hee of Special Investigation Center		Teugbyeolsusabonbu yeodaesaeng I Nanhuisageon		
1973	Leaving Myeong Dong		Myeongdong-eul tteonamyeonseo		
1972	Aunt		Imo		
1972	A Lady Born in the Year of Rat 2		Jwittibu-in		
1972	An Honorable Student of Life		Insaeng-udeungsaeng		
1972	A Judge's Wife		Pansabu-in		
1972	A Man and a Woman		Namgwa yeo		
1972	Looking for Sons and Daughters		Adeul ttal chaj-a cheonligil		
1972	My Love of the South and the North		Namgwa bug-ui dangsin		
1972	A Lady Born in the Year of Rat		Jwittibu-in		
1972	The Wedding Ring		Gyeolhonbanji		
1972	Oh, Frailty		Yaghanja-yeo		
1972	One to One		Ildae-il		
1972	The Fugitive in the Storm		Pog-usog-ui domangja		
1972	Nationwide Graduates		Paldojol-eobsaeng		
1972	Please Be Happy, My Daughters		Jalsal-ada-o nae ttaldeul-a		
1972	Cruel History of Myeong Dong		Myeongdongjanhogsa		
1972	Where Should I Go?		Eodilo ga-yahana		
1972	Life is On the Lonely Road		Insaeng-eun nageunegil		
1972	I Will Give It All		Akkim-eobs-i bachili		
1972	Me, Myself and I		Na-wa na		
1971	I		Na		
1971	A Second Mother		Duljjae-eomeoni		
1971	Beautiful Korea		Aleumda-un paldogangsan		
1971	Whirl of Betrayals on Myeongdong		Myeongdongsamgugji		
1971	Cell-mates		Dongchangsaeng		
1971	The Women of Kyeongbokgung		Gyeongboggung-ui yeo-indeul		
1971	Bye, Mom		Eomma annyeong		
1971	Leaving in the Rain		Bissog-e tteonal salam		
1971	Is Your Husband Like This Too?		Daeg-ui appado ileohseubnikka		
1971	Woman of Fire		Hwanyeo		
1971	Light in the Field		Cho-won-ui bich		
1971	Action Episodes		Hwalgeugdaesa		
1971	The Royal Emissary With No ID		Mapae-eobsneun eosa		
1971	What Happened That Night		Geunalbam saenggin il		
1971	Why Do You Abandon Me		Naleul beolisinaikka		
1971	My Love, My Foe		Hyeonsangbut-eun 4in-ui agnyeo		
1971	A Woman Gambler		Eoneu yeodobagsa		
1971	A Hotel Room		Yeochang		
1971	Two Sons Sequel		Du adeul		
1971	A Student of Life		Insaeng-yuhagsaeng		
1971	Until Next Time		Mi-wodo annyeong		
1971	My Wife		Nae anae-yeo		
1971	444, Jongno St.		Jonglo 444beonji		
1971	I'll Follow My Husband		Seobangnim ttalaseo		
1971	Brother		Oppa		
1971	A Guilty Woman		Joemanh-eun yeo-in		
1971	His Double Life		Miseu Lee		
1971	A Bout in 30 Years		30nyeonman-ui daegyeol		
1971	Foggy Jangchoongdan Stadium		Angaekkin Jangchungdangong-won		
1971	Twelve Women		Yeoldu yeo-in		
1971	I Can't Forget You		Gandago ij-eulsonya		
1971	Five Fighters		5in-ui geondaldeul		
1971	Three Half-brothers		Ibog 3hyeongje		
1971	Wild Magpie		Oelo-un sankkachi		
1971	Time on Myungdong		Myeongdong-e heuleuneun se-wol		
1971	Sorrow in Tears		Dujulgi nunmulsog-e		
1971	Some Married Couple		Eoneu bubu		
1970	Tokyo Lion and Myeongdong Tiger		Donggyeongsaja-wa Myeongdongholang-i		
1970	Visitor in the Dead of the Night		Sim-ya-ui bangmungaeg		
1970	Friendship of Hope		Nae-il-issneun ujeong		
1970	Lefty Without a Tomorrow		Nae-il-eobsneun oensonjab-i		
1970	I will Bear No More		Naneun cham-eul su eobsda		
1970	House of a Stranger		Ta-in-ui jib		
1970	Yearning for a Lover		Imgeuli-wo		
1970	Please Turn Off the Light		Bang-e bul-eul kkeoju-o		
1970	Chastity		Sungyeol		
1970	Dance with My Father		Appa-wa hamkke chum-eul		
1970	Escape		Samhotalchul		
1970	King Yeong-chin, the Last Crown Prince		Majimag hwangtaeja Yeongchin-wang		
1970	Back Alley No. 5		Dwisgolmog obeonji		
1970	A Portrait in the Coffin		Gwansog-ui mi-inhwa		
1970	Dangerous Liaison		Wiheomhan gwangye		
1970	Blue Bedroom		Puleun chimsil		
1970	Golden Operation 70 in Hong Kong		Hwanggeum70 Hongkongjagjeon		
1970	Between My Father's Arms		Appapum-e		
1970	Woman with Long Eyelashes		Sognunseob-i gin yeoja		
1970	Frozen Spring		Dongchun		
1970	A Woman's Battleground		Yeo-injeonjang		
1969	Let Me Free		Idaeto Tteonage Hae Juseyo		
1969	The Third Zone		Jesamjidae		
1969	Parking Lot		Juchajang		
1969	Love is the Seed of Tears		Sarang-eun Nunmul-ui Ssi-at		
1968	Don't Leave Behind Your Love		Jeong Dugo Gajima		
1968	The Third Zone		Jesam jidae		
1968	Remarriage		Jaehon		
1967	Can't Forget		Geuraedo Monnijeo		
1967	The Life of Na Woon-gyu		Naungyu Ilsaeng		
1967	Miracle		Gijeok		
1967	You and Me		Neowa Na		
1967	Yeonhwa		Yeonhwa		
1967	Tourist Train		Gwan-gwang Yeolcha		
1966	Ok-i Makes a Judge Cry		Beopchangeul ulrin ok-i		
1966	A Seoul Boy		Seoul meoseuma		
1966	Bitter Daedong River		Hanmaneun Daedonggang		
1966	The Loser and the Winner		Ireun Jawa Chajeun Ja		
1966	Well-lighted Room of the Newly Married		Hwachoksinbang		
1966	Night Blues		Bamhaneurui Blues		
1966	Decorations Never Rust		Hunjangeun Nokseulji Anneunda		
1965	Lost Years		Ireobeorin Sewol		
1965	The Last Passion		Majimak Jeong-yeol		
1965	I Don't Want to Die		Naneun Jukgi Silta		
1965	Behold with an Angry Face		Seongnan Eolgullo Dol-abora		
1965	Madam Oh		Omadam		
1965	Never Regret		Huhoehaji Angetda		
1965	Flesh and Blood		Pi-wa Sal		
1965	The Virgin Playing Saxophone		Saxophone Buneun Cheonyeo		
1965	Good and Evil		Seongwa Ak		
1965	The Foster Mother & the Natural Mother				
1965	The Sworn Brothers		Uihyeongje		
1965	The North and South		Namgwa Buk		
1964	The Heartbreaking Love of Mother		Pi-eorin Mojeong		
1964	Let's Meet on Thursday		Mogyoire Mannapsida		
1964	The Housemaid		Singmo		
1964	The Intimidator		Hyeopbakja		
1964	The Sorrowful Separation		Ibyeolman-eun Seulpeudeora		
1964	The Night When Raining over the Acacia		Akasi-a-e Bi-oneun Bam		
1964	The Blues with the Black Scar		Geomeun Sangcheo-ui Bureuseu		
1964	The Invisible Border Line		Guggyeong-anin Gukgyeongseon		
1964	Take a Course to the South		Gisureul Namjjok-euro Dollyeora		
1964	Red Scarf		Ppalgan Mahura		
1964	Where Can I Stand?		Naega Seol Ttang-eun Eodinya		
1964	The Lady of Gye-dong		Gyedong Assi		
1964	The Chaser		Chugyeokja		
1963	The Loneliest Man in Seoul		Seo-ulseo Je-il Sseulsseulhan Sanai		
1963	Stars on the Earth		Daeji-ui Seongjwa		
1963	The Marines Who Never Returned		Dora-oji Anneun Haebyeong		
1963	Gaya's House		Gaya-ui Jib		
1963	Prince Sun and Princess Moon		Haennim Wangjawa Dalnim Gongju		
1963	The Only Son		Oe-adeul		
1963	Golden Grass of Yesterday		Yennare Geumjandi		
1963	00:15 Train from Daejeon		Daejeonbal Yeongsi Osibbun		
1963	Hundred Years' Enmity		Baengnyeonhan		
1963	Monyeo Ridge Where The Flute Is Played		Pilibuldeon Monyeo Gogae		
1963	Love Like Stars		Sarang-a Byeol-gwa Gachi		
1963	To Part at Busan Harbor in Tears		Ulmyeo He-eojin Busanhang		
1963	A Beggar Prince		Geoji Wangja		
1963	Bloodline		Hyeolmaek		
1963	Jimmy Is Not Sad		Jimmyneun Seulpeuji Anta		
1963	The Fiancee		Yakhonnyeo		
1963	The Virgin in the Pub		Seonsuljib Cheonyeo		
1963	Ssangeommu		Ssanggeommu		
1963	Love and Good-bye		Mannal Ttaewa He-eojil Ttae		
1963	The Long Nakdong River		Nakdonggang Chilbaengri		
1962	Bulgasari		Bulgasari		
1962	Mother's Love		Moseong-ae		
1962	When the Cloud Scatters Away		Gureumi Heuteojil Ttae		
1962	Where Love and Death Meet		Sarang-gwa Jugeum-ui Haehyeob		
1962	A Log Bridge		Oenamudari		
1962	Call 112		112reul Dollyeora		
1962	Yang Kuei-Fei		Yang Gwibi		
1962	Great Monk Wonhyo		Wonhyo Daesa		
1962	Sad Miari Pass		Hanmaneun Miari Gogae		
1962	Son Ogong		Son Ogong		
1962	The Way to Seoul		Seoullo Ganeun Gil		
1962	Gyewolhyang		Pyeongyang Gisaeng Gyewolhyang		
1962	Between the Sky and the Earth		Haneulgwa Ttangsa-i-e		
1962	The Best Bride and a Plain Young Man		Teukdeungsinbu-wa Samdeung Sillang		
1962	Want to Go Somewhere		Eodinji Gago Sipeo		
1962	A Lady in Black Gloves		Geomeun Janggab-ui Yeoin		
1962	Great Challenge		Dae-dojeon		
1962	Even Though I Die		Moksumeul Geolgo		
1962	The War and an Old Man		Jeonjaenggwa No-in		
1962	There Is No Bad Man		Agineun Eopda		
1962	What Happens in an Alley		Golmogan Punggyeong		
1962	Be Tough, Geumsun!		Gutse-eora Geumsuna		
1962	Coming Home		Gwihyang		
1961	Fishermen		Eobudeul		
1961	Ignorant but Now Rich		Chon Obogi		
1961	For This Moment		I Sungan-eul Wihayeo		
1961	Emile		Emille Jong		
1961	My Father		Abeoji		
1961	Stars' Home		Byeorui Gohyang		
1961	Farewell at Busan		Ibyeol-ui Busan Jeonggeojang		
1961	Wonsullang		Wonsullang		
1961	Yangsando		Yangsando		
1961	Confession at Midnight		Simya-ui Gobaek		
1961	Don't Touch Me		Naemom-e Son-eul Daeji Mara		
1961	I Don't Regret		Nae Cheongchun-e Han-eun Eopda		
1961	A Gang of Robbers		Gundo		
1961	On the Eve of the Liberation Day		Pariro Jeonya		
1961	A Sunflower Family		Haebaragi Gajok		
1961	Gate to the Forbidden		Geumdan-ui mun		
1961	Five Marines		O in-ui haebyeong		
1961	Lim Kkeok-jeong		Lim Kkeok-jeong		
1961	Half Brothers		Ibok Hyeongje		
1961	A Mistress		Jeongbu		
1961	A Disobedient Son		Bulhyoja		
1960	Obaltan		Obaltan		
1960	A Fig		Muhwagwa		
1960	Song in My Heart		Naegaseum-e geu nolaeleul		
1960	A Rainbow		Mujigae		
1960	Late-night Blues		Sim-ya-ui buleuseu		
1960	Sorrow like a River		Seulpeum-eun gangmulcheoleom		
1960	A Terminal Station of Separation		Ibyeol-ui jongchag-yeog		
1960	An Image of Mother		Mosang		
1960	Katyusha		Katyusha		
1960	A Revival		Jaesaeng		
1960	A Memorandum of a Female Teacher		Eoneu yeogyosa-ui sugi		
1960	Mother's Power		Eomeoni-ui him		
1960	A Son's Judgement		Adeul-ui simpan		
1960	Mother Earth		Daeji-ui eomeoni		
1960	The Moral of Youth		Cheongchun-ui yunli		
1960	I Won't Cry		Ulji anheulyeonda		
1960	Through a Darkness		Amheug-eul ttulhgo		
1960	I Will Forget the Name		Geu ireum-eul ij-euri		
1960	A Drifting Story		Pyoludo		
1960	As You Please		Jemeosdaelo		
1960	Although it is Far		Gil-eun meol-eodo		
1960	A Young Blueprint		Jeolm-eun seolgyedo		
1960	A Stormy Hill		Pogpung-ui eondeog		
1960	The Milky Way in the Blue Sky		Pureunhanul Eunhasu		
1959	Rainy Day 3 p.m.		Bioneun Narui Ohu Sesi		
1959	A Star Crying Alone		Hollo Uneun Byeol		
1959	A Barber of Jangmaru Village		Jangmaruchonui Ibalsa		
1959	Stars Over the Window		Byeoreun Changneomeoro		
1959	Always Thinking of You		Jana Kkaena		
1959	Another Love Comes Again		Sarang Dwie Oneun Sarang		
1959	I and a Star		Byeolhana Nahana		
1959	Diary of Youths		Cheongchunilgi		
1959	An Inn		Yeoinsuk		
1959	A Vanished Dream		Kkumeun Sarajigo		
1959	Spring Comes and Goes		Ganeun Bom Oneun Bom		
1959	Even the Clouds Are Drifting		Gureumeun Heulleodo		
1959	Daewongun Regent and Queen Minbi		Daewongungwa Minbi		
1959	Early Spring		Jochun		
1959	Even The Love Has Gone		Sarangeun Heulleogado		
1959	Independence Association and young Lee Seung-Man		Dongniphyeophoewa Cheongnyeon Lee Seung-man		
1959	A Negro Whom I Got		Naega Naeun Geomdungi		
1959	Men vs. Women		Namseong Dae Yeoseong		
1959	A White Pearl		Baekjinju		
1959	Affection and Apathy		Yujeongmujeong (original title: Pamun)		
1959	She Should Live		Saraya Handa		
1959	A Necklace of Reminiscence		Chueogui Mokgeori		
1959	No More Tragedies		Bigeugeun Eopda		
1959	Terms of Marriage		Gyeolhonjogeon		
1959	A Way of a Body		Yukcheui Gil, The Way of All Flesh		
1958	The Third Class Hotel		Samdeunghotel		
1958	An Incense Fire		Mado-ui hyangbul		
1958	The Love of Shadow		Geurimja sarang		
1958	The Lost People		Gil-ilh-eun salamdeul		
1957	An Exotic Garden		Igugjeong-won		
1957	The Lost Youth		Ilh-eobeolin cheongchun		
1957	Life of a Woman		Geu yeoja-ui ilsaeng		
1957	A Night at a Harbor		Hanggu-ui il-ya		
1956	The Sadness of Heredity		Yujeon-ui aesu		
1956	A Woman's Enemy		Yeoseong-ui jeog		
1955	Box of Death		Jugeom-ui sangja		
1955	The Youth		Jeolm-eun geudeul		
1954	Turbid Water		Tangnyu		

== Awards ==
*Note; the whole list is referenced.

- 1963, the 1st Blue Dragon Film Awards : Special Award: Group Acting (돌아오지 않는 해병)
- 1964, the 2nd Blue Dragon Film Awards : Best Supporting Actor (Red Scarf (빨간 마후라))
- 1971, the 10th Grand Bell Awards : Best Supporting Actor (마지막 황태자 영친왕)
- 1971, the 7th Baeksang Arts Awards : Best Film Actor (방에 불을 꺼주오)
- 1971, the 8th Blue Dragon Film Awards : Best Actor (30년만의 대결)
- 1972, the 9th Blue Dragon Film Awards : Favorite Actor
- 1973, the 9th Baeksang Arts Awards : Favorite Film Actor selected by readers
- 1973, the 10th Blue Dragon Film Awards : Favorite Actor
- 1974, the 10th Baeksang Arts Awards : Favorite Film Actor selected by readers
- 1999, the 36th Grand Bell Awards : Film Development Lifetime Achievement
- 2000, the 4th Puchon International Fantastic Film Festival : Lifetime Achievement

== Election results ==
Year	Elections	Constituency	Political party	Votes (%)	Results
1988	13th National Assembly General Election	Paju (Gyeonggi)	NDRP	34,219 (41.80%)	Won
