= Seo Jeong-min =

South Korean cinematographer

- Occupation: Cinematographer
- Years active: 1963–2015
- Notable work: The Marines Who Never Returned, Wild Animals, Whispering Corridors

Korean name
- Hangul: 서정민
- RR: Seo Jeongmin
- MR: Sŏ Chŏngmin

Seo Jeong-min (Korean: 서정민; 5 January 1934 – 7 July 2015) was a South Korean cinematographer who worked on over 130 films from 1959. He died on 7 July 2015, at the age of 81.

== Early life ==
Born in Incheon in 1934, he spent his early years in Hamhung and Chongjin before returning to Incheon, where he experienced Korea's liberation and the Korean War. As a child, he loved watching movies at the theater. In his fourth year at Korea University, studying chemistry, he coincidentally entered the film industry through the recommendation of director Park Sung-bok, a friend of his senior.

== Career ==
He debuted with director Im Won-jik's Chon Oboki (1961). In 1964, he won the Grand Bell Awards for Best New Cinematographer for The Marines Who Never Returned, marking the beginning of a period where he almost exclusively handled the cinematography for director Lee Man-hee's major works, dominating the era. In 1966, he also directed Hooni's Mom from Dongdaemun Market, starring Kim Ji-mi, Heo Jang-kang, and Park No-sik.

Later, he worked with directors Kim Ki-young, Im Kwon-taek, and Lee Doo-yong, and continued to participate in films by directors Lee Jang-ho, Jung Ji-young, and Kim Ki-duk in the 1980s and 1990s, becoming a name that connected the past and present of Korean cinema.

== Partial filmography ==
Referenced by:

- The Marines Who Never Returned (1963)
- The Watermill (1966)
- Wild Animals (1997)
- Piano Man (1997)
- Birdcage Inn (1998)
- Whispering Corridors (1998)
- Libera Me (2000)
- Address Unknown (2001)
- Wishing Stairs (2003)
- My Little Bride (2004)
- Wet Dreams 2 (2004)

== Awards and nominations ==
Awards and nominations
Award ceremony	Year	Category	Nominee / Work	Result	Ref.
Grand Bell Awards	1964	Best New Cinematographer	The Marines Who Never Returned	Won	
Grand Bell Awards	1997	Best Cinematographer	Piano Man	Won	
Grand Bell Awards	2001	Best Cinematographer	Libera Me	Won	
Golden Cinematography Awards	1977	Best Cinematographer — Bronze Award	First Love	Won	
Golden Cinematography Awards	1978	Best Cinematographer — Gold Award	The Last Day of Dosolsan	Won	
Golden Cinematography Awards	1982	Best Cinematographer — Gold Award	They Shot the Sun	Won	
Golden Cinematography Awards	1984	Best Cinematographer — Bronze Award	Declaration of Fools	Won	
Golden Cinematography Awards	1994	Best Cinematographer — Gold Award	Absolute Love	Won	
Golden Cinematography Awards	1997	Best Cinematographer — Gold Award	Piano Man	Won	
Golden Cinematography Awards	2001	Best Cinematographer — Gold Award	Libera Me	Won	
