= Box of Death =

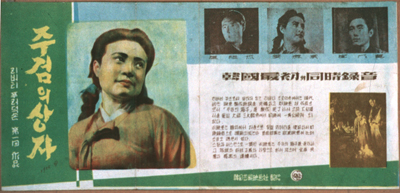
- Korean poster for Box of Death (1955)
- Hangul: 주검의 상자
- Hanja: 주검의 箱子
- RR: Jugeomui sangja
- MR: Chugŏmŭi sangja
- Directed by: Kim Ki-young
- Written by: Kim Chang-sik
- Starring: Choi Moo-ryong; Kang Hyo-shil
- Cinematography: Kim Hyeong-geun
- Edited by: Yu Jae-won
- Music by: Jeong Yoon-joo
- Distributed by: U.S.I.S.
- Release date: June 11, 1955
- Running time: 79 minutes
- Country: South Korea
- Language: Korean

Box of Death (Korean: 주검의 상자) is a 1955 South Korean film directed by Kim Ki-young. It was the celebrated director's debut film, and the first Korean film to use synchronous sound.

== Synopsis ==
An anti-communist film about a plot to stir up pro-communist sympathies through an act of terrorism. A young village man foils the plot by infiltrating the communist camp and blowing it up instead.

== Cast ==
- Choi Moo-ryong
- Kang Hyo-shil
- No Neung-geol
- Choi Nam-Hyun
- Kim Myung-soon
- Sin Dong-hun
- Ju In-seon

== Bibliography ==
- Berry, Chris. "The Box of Death". The House of Kim Ki-young]. Archived from the original on 2004-05-08.
- Jukeomiui sangja (1955) at IMDb
- "The Box of Death (Jugeom-ui sangja)(1955)". [KMDb Korean Movie Database]. Archived from the original on 2008-02-27.
