= Wild Animals (film) =

1997 South Korean film by Kim Ki-Duk

- Wild Animals promotional movie poster
- Hangul: 야생동물 보호구역
- Hanja: 野生動物 保護區域
- RR: Yasaengdongmul bohoguyeok
- MR: Yasaengdongmul pohoguyŏk
- Directed by: Kim Ki-duk
- Written by: Kim Ki-duk
- Produced by: Kwon Ki-yeong; Park Kwang-su
- Starring: Cho Jae-hyun; Jang Dong-jik; Jang Ryun
- Cinematography: Seo Jeong-min
- Edited by: Park Seon-deok
- Music by: Kang In-gu; Oh Jin-ha
- Distributed by: Dream Cinema
- Release date: October 25, 1997 (South Korea)
- Running time: 105 minutes
- Country: South Korea
- Languages: Korean; French

Wild Animals (Korean: 야생동물 보호구역; RR: Yasaengdongmul bohoguyeok) is Korean director Kim Ki-duk's second film, released in 1997. It is a crime-drama film set in Paris, and stars Cho Jae-hyun, Dong-jik Jang and Ryun Jang.

== Synopsis ==
A North Korean and a South Korean meet each other by chance in Paris and become involved in the intrigues of the Paris underworld.

== Cast ==
Actor	Role
Cho Jae-hyun	Cheong-hae
Jang Dong-jik	Hong-san
Jang Ryun	Laura
Sasha Rucavinaa	Corrine
Richard Bohringer	Boss
Denis Lavant	Emil
Laurent Buro	Pare
