= Steve Balsamo =

- Born: 19 May 1971 (age 55); Wales
- Origin: Wales
- Genres: Folk rock; pop
- Occupations: Musician; songwriter; stage actor
- Instruments: Vocals; guitar; piano
- Website: stevebalsamomusic.com

Steve Balsamo is a Welsh singer and songwriter, best known for playing the title role in the West End revival productions of Jesus Christ Superstar during the mid-1990s. He performs as a member of several bands and is also a successful songwriter. He is also on Eric Woolfson's sixth solo album, Poe: More Tales of Mystery and Imagination in 2003, on which he provides the vocals for eight songs.

== Biography ==
Steve Balsamo was born in Swansea, his father being a chef from Venice and his mother Welsh. He attended Dynevor School in the heart of the city and, while there, he was dismissed from the choir, being told he could not sing. He channelled his creative leanings into art and attended art school to specialise in painting. At the age of 17, he resumed singing and songwriting, forming several bands which toured pubs and clubs performing renditions of classic rock songs.

He had jobs that included a stint as a piano remover and working at Port Talbot steelworks—in between bouts on the dole—taken to support himself while gigging. He secured a place at Bristol University to study Graphic Art, but turned it down to accept a place at a local music college, where he played the role of Jesus in a production of Jesus Christ Superstar, a role that he reprised as an adult. In the meantime, he taught himself to play guitar and continued to write songs.

Around this time, Balsamo attended a workshop in Cardiff run by The Prince's Trust for unemployed musicians. He was asked to open The Prince's Trust Masters of Music Concert at Hyde Park in 1996, in front of a 150,000 crowd.

After a friend mentioned to Steve that Andrew Lloyd Webber was looking for a performer to play the part of Jesus, the role he played in college, Balsamo seized the opportunity to showcase his 3½ octave range voice, determined to get the part. Despite his lack of West End experience, he won the role of Jesus from the thousands who auditioned, leading to a memorable headline: "The Son of God is Welsh". On one television performance from the show he not only had Andrew Lloyd Webber weeping, but also managed to sell £160,000 worth of tickets to the show in half an hour. He won a Variety Club award for the role in 1997.

Balsamo signed to Columbia Records and started writing and recording his first album, All I Am, which was released in September 2002. The debut single from the album, "Sugar for the Soul" entered the UK Top 40, and was a frequently-requested favourite on The Box music channel and led to a TOTP2 appearance. The second single from the album, "All I Am is You", was Ken Bruce's single of the week on Radio 2.

Balsamo returned to the stage in the French musical "Notre Dame de Paris". He then worked on Poe: More Tales of Mystery and Imagination, a new musical and an album by Alan Parsons Project writer Eric Woolfson, based on the life of poet Edgar Allan Poe. It premiered at Abbey Road Studios in 2003.

Balsamo co-wrote the French entry for the Eurovision Song Contest 2004, which finished 15th.

In 2004, Balsamo formed The Storys, a West Coast influenced country rock band consisting of Andy Collins (bass/vocals/songwriting), Dai Smith (guitar/vocals/songwriting), Alan Thomas (keyboards), Brian Thomas (drums/percussion) and Rob Thompson (guitar/vocals/songwriting). Dai Smith left in 2008 and was replaced by Rosalie Deighton.

Balsamo, along with Storys bandmate Rob Thompson and Rob Reed of prog rock band Magenta, also worked on a progrock project called ChimpanA. With Rob Thompson and Andy Collins of The Storys he released an EP under the name of Oystermouth, "Five Songs For Jen".

Balsamo is a prolific songwriter and has had hits in Europe and Australia with artists such as Meat Loaf, Anthony Callea, Jonatan Cerrada, and Slash of Guns N' Roses.

He toured with the late Jon Lord and had been writing and recording with him before Lord's death. Recently he has been writing songs with folk singer Rosalie Deighton for a duet project called Balsamo Deighton,° who performed in Swansea, Wales in 2013 in tribute to fellow Welshman Pete Ham.

== Theatre ==
- Eric Woolfson's Poe (Concert Performance) - Edgar Allan Poe

Venue: Abbey Road Studios, London (6 to 8 November 2003)

- Notre Dame De Paris - Phoebus

Venue: Dominion Theatre, London (May to October 2000)

- Jesus Christ Superstar - Jesus of Nazareth

Venue: Lyceum Theatre, London (November 1996 to September 1997)

- Les Misérables - Feuilly and understudied and played Marius

Venue: The Point, Dublin and Edinburgh Playhouse (1993)

== Discography ==
Albums:

- All I Am (Released: 9 September 2002, Columbia Records)
- The Millennium Tapes (Released 4 December 2020)

Extended Plays:

- Circle the Wagons (Released: 14 December 2018, Ghost Horse Records)
- High on Sunset (Released: 12 July 2019, Ghost Horse Records)

Singles:

- "Sugar for the Soul" (Released: 4 March 2002, Columbia) UK #32
- "All I Am is You" (Released: 2 September 2002, Columbia)
- "Immortal" (Released: 2003, Sony Music)
- "Well of Souls" (Released: 21 December 2009)
- "Until the Day" (Released: 6 January 2020)
- "Breaking Apart" (Released: 4 September 2020)
- "Armour of My Soul" (Released: 19 May 2021, Ghost Horse Records)
- "Lighthouse Keeper" (Released 20 December 2021, Ghost Horse Records)
- "Snow Angels" (Released 28 November 2023)
