= Marriage Story (1992 film) =

- Theatrical release poster
- Hangul: 결혼 이야기
- Hanja: 結婚 이야기
- RR: Gyeolhon iyagi
- MR: Kyŏrhon iyagi
- Directed by: Kim Ui-seok
- Written by: Park Heon-su
- Produced by: Park Sang-in; Oh Jung-wan
- Starring: Choi Min-soo; Shim Hye-jin
- Cinematography: Koo Joong-mo
- Edited by: Park Soon-duk; Park Gok-ji
- Music by: Song Byeong-joon
- Distributed by: Shin Cine Communications; Ik Young Films Co., Ltd.
- Release date: July 4, 1992 (South Korea)
- Country: South Korea
- Language: Korean

Marriage Story (Korean: 결혼 이야기) is a 1992 South Korean romantic comedy film directed by Kim Ui-seok and starring Choi Min-soo and Shim Hye-jin. It was the highest-grossing South Korean film of 1992, and became the fourth most highly attended Korean film between 1990 and 1995.

== Plot ==
The film follows the romantic relationship between middle-class couple Kim Tae-kyu and Choe Ji-hae, from their wedding to a break-up and eventual reconciliation.

== Cast ==
- Choi Min-soo as Kim Tae-kyu
- Shim Hye-jin as Choe Ji-hae
- Lee Hee-do as Yun Il-jung
- Kim Hui-ryeong as Oh Hyang-suk
- Kim Seong-su as PD Han
- Dokgo Young-jae as Park Chang-su
- Yang Taek-jo as Cha-jang
- Joo Ho-sung as Shin Seon-bae
- Yun Mun-sik as Jjik-sae
- Kim Ki-hyeon as Columbo
