= Bulgasari =

1962 South Korean lost film

- Theatrical release poster
- Hangul: 송도말년의 불가사리
- Hanja: 松都末年의 불가사리
- RR: Songdo mallyeonui bulgasari
- MR: Songdo mallyŏnŭi pulgasari
- Directed by: Kim Myeong-je
- Screenplay by: Yoon Beom
- Produced by: Cho Yong-jin
- Starring: Choi Moo-ryong; Um Aing-ran; Kang Mi-ae
- Cinematography: Kim Yeong-sun
- Edited by: Kim Myeong-je
- Music by: Kim Yong-hwan
- Production company: Kwang Seong Films
- Release date: December 1, 1962
- Running time: 110 minutes
- Country: South Korea
- Language: Korean
- Budget: ₩3.5 million

Bulgasari at the End of Songdo, (Note: Korean: 송도말년의 불가사리; Hanja: 松都末年의 불가사리) or simply Bulgasari, (Note: 불가사리; also known as The Iron-eating Monster.) is a lost 1962 South Korean kaiju film directed and edited by Kim Myeong-je. Produced by Kwang Seong Films, it was the first monster movie to be made in South Korea, as well as the first Korean film to use special effects. It stars Choi Moo-ryong as Nam Hyeong, a martial artist who is resurrected as the iron-eating monster Bulgasari to have revenge on his murderers.

Bulgasari was reported to have begun production on November 26, 1961. It was inspired by the legendary Korean monster of the same name and heavily influenced by Godzilla (1954). On an approximately ₩3.5 million budget, Bulgasari began principal photography on February 28, 1962, and wrapped on March 24.

Bulgasari was released theatrically in South Korea on December 1, 1962. The film received negative reviews from critics, especially because of its unconvincing special effects, direction, and acting. Believed to have disappeared shortly after its release, the film is considered a significant feature in the history of South Korean cinema and one of the most sought-after lost kaiju films. Shin Sang-ok directed a 1985 remake of the film during his abduction in North Korea.

== Plot ==
In Songdo (present-day Kaesong), during the late Goryeo dynasty, an experienced martial artist named Nam Hyeong is slaughtered by traitors. His hatred causes him to resurrect as an iron-eating monster, known as the Bulgasari, to seek revenge. (Note: As Bulgasari is considered a lost film, this synopsis is derived from the review featured in the December 7, 1962 issue of The Chosun Ilbo and a summary at the Korean Movie Database. A longer synopsis is featured in the April 1962 issue of Cinefan (p. 130), a pdf of which is also available on the Korean Movie Database.)

== Cast ==
- Choi Moo-ryong as Nam Hyeong / Bulgasari
- Um Aing-ran as Nam Lee
- Kang Mi-ae as Eunjeon Lee
- Kim Dong-won as the Castellan
- Lee Up-dong as Seonhye
- Jo Hang as the division director
- Choe Seong-ho as Do-Cheol
- Ji Bang-yeol as the ambassador of Dohwa
- Park Sun-bong as a gatekeeper
- No Gang as a gatekeeper
- Park Il as a strange man
- Park Kwang-jin as a strange man
- Park Gyeong-ju as Jeong Seung
- Sin Dong-hun
- Jeon Ye-chool
- Gang Cheol

Cast taken from the Korean Movie Database.

== Crew ==
- Kim Myeong-je – director, editor
- Gang Sin-tak – planner
- Yang Jeong-chun – lighting
- Won Je-rae – art director
- Lee Seung-tae – costume designer
- Lee Kyeong-sun – sound recording
- Kwon Jinkyu – miniature artist

Personnel taken from the Korean Movie Database.

== Production ==
Bulgasari was reported to have begun production on November 26, 1961. The film was inspired by the legendary Korean monster of the same name and heavily influenced by the 1954 kaiju film Godzilla. Principal photography began on February 28, 1962, and wrapped on March 24, on a budget of roughly ₩3.5 million.

Bulgasari was the first South Korean film to use special effects. Two noteworthy special effects sequences caught viewers' attention: a witchcraft performance by the "White Lady" and her ascension into heaven.

== Release ==
Bulgasari was promoted as Korea's first film to use special effects in its "40 year history". It was screened at the Myungbo Theater in Seoul on December 1, 1962. The Korean Movie Database indicates the Korean Film Archive owns a document printed on March 26, 1963, suggesting a print of the film was made for North Korean screenings, but it is unclear whether it was ever used.

=== Critical response ===
Bulgasari was widely panned upon its release due to ineffective special effects and antiquated direction by Kim Myeong-je. At the time, historical films were the only spectacles worth watching in Korea, and this film was dubbed "third-rate entertainment". A reviewer for The Chosun Ilbo felt Kim's directing method was outdated, and stated Choi Moo-ryong and Um Aing-ran's acting was "not very good", adding: "it adds boredom to the chorus of breathing in every line through the first part." The reviewer also noted that they could see "the strings hanging from the dragon's head" in one scene.

== Legacy ==
Bulgasari is believed to have vanished shortly after its release, leaving only contemporary news articles and posters as evidence of its existence. It has become one of the most sought-after lost films in the kaiju genre, along with Wasei Kingu Kongu, The Great Buddha Arrival, and The King Kong That Appeared in Edo. While the film itself is considered lost, the original screenplay is preserved at the Korean Film Archive. However, the screenplay is not accessible by the public.

=== Remake ===
Kim Jong Il assigned South Korean filmmaker Shin Sang-ok to direct a remake of the film in 1985, titled Pulgasari.
