= Bulgasari (creature) =

Creature from Korean folklore

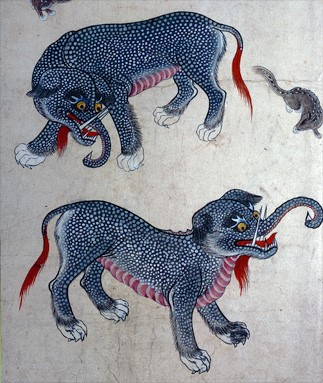

Korean name
- Hangul: 불가사리
- RR: bulgasari
- MR: pulgasari

The Bulgasari or Pulgasari (Korean: 불가사리) is a metal-eating legendary creature that appears in Korean mythology and folklore. The creature is a composite creature with the body of a bear, the trunk of an elephant, the eyes of a rhinoceros, the claws of a tiger, and the tail of a bull.

In Korean, the name "Bulgasari" translates to "something impossible to kill"; however, swapping the first Chinese character for a Korean character of the same pronunciation and choosing the corresponding Chinese character to that Korean character results in a spelling that translates to "something that can be killed by fire".

The Bulgasari is often portrayed as heroic in mythology because it causes destruction to punish evil in society, although negative folktales about it also exist.

== Mythology ==
The legend of the Bulgasari originated in the late 14th century.

According to legend, the Bulgasari is a bloodthirsty beast that grows in size as it eats metal. Myth states that it was created by a Buddhist monk who was fleeing persecution because Buddhism was illegal in Goryeo-era Korea. He created a small figure out of rice grains, which he fed needles, and it began to grow. It soon became massive, and the government sent soldiers to kill it with arrows and swords, but it simply ate the metal weapons and became stronger. Finally, they decided to kill it with fire, but this had no effect on it, and the Bulgasari carried the fire to burn down a local village. Myths differ on the fate of the Bulgasari; some say that it still lives to this day, while others say that it was defeated by monks.

According to legend, it can defeat nightmares and evil spirits, protect against incubi, and prevent plagues and natural disasters. As a result, it was sculpted as a sentry on walls, chimneys, railings, and pillars.

== See also ==
- Bulgasari – A 1962 South Korean film about the monster
- Pulgasari – A 1985 North Korean film about the monster
- Galgameth – A 1996 American remake of Pulgasari
