= Nambugun =

- Theatrical poster
- Hangul: 남부군
- Hanja: 南部軍
- RR: Nambugun
- MR: Nambugun
- Directed by: Chung Ji-young
- Written by: Lee Tae (novel); Jang Sun-woo
- Produced by: Chung Ji-young
- Starring: Ahn Sung-ki; Choi Jin-sil; Choi Min-soo; Lee Hye-young
- Cinematography: You Yong-kil
- Edited by: Kim Hyeon
- Music by: Shin Bung-ha
- Production company: Nam Production
- Release date: June 2, 1990
- Running time: 158 minutes
- Country: South Korea
- Language: Korean

Nambugun: North Korean Partisan in South Korea (Korean: 남부군) is a 1990 South Korean war drama film directed by Chung Ji-young. It is based upon the experiences of Lee Tae, a war correspondent and pro-North Korean Partisan during the Korean War.

== Cast ==
- Ahn Sung-ki ... Lee Tae
- Choi Jin-sil ... Park Min-ja
- Choi Min-soo ... Kim Young
- Lee Hye-young ... Kim Hee-suk

== Reception ==
The film was noted as one of the first films to depict a story from a North Korean perspective in South Korea after the end of military rule in 1987. The film earned Chung Ji-young an award for Best Director at the 11th Blue Dragon Film Awards in 1990 and was selected as one of the 100 Best Korean Films by the Korean Film Archive in 2014.

== See also ==
- The Taebaek Mountains
