= 301, 302 =

1995 film by Park Cheol-su

- Theatrical poster
- Hangul: 삼공일, 삼공이
- Hanja: 三空一, 三空二
- RR: Samgongil, samgongi
- MR: Samgongil, samgongi
- Directed by: Park Chul-soo
- Written by: Lee Seo-gun
- Produced by: Park Chul-soo
- Starring: Bang Eun-jin; Hwang Shin-hye
- Cinematography: Lee Eun-gil
- Edited by: Park Gok-ji
- Music by: Byeon Sung-yong
- Production company: Park Chul-Soo Films Ltd.
- Release date: 21 April 1995
- Running time: 100 minutes
- Country: South Korea
- Language: Korean

301, 302 or 301/302 is a 1995 South Korean psychological thriller film directed by Park Chul-soo, and starring Bang Eun-jin and Hwang Shin-hye. It tells the story of two women, neighbors in the same apartment building, who take very different approaches to the difficulties of modern life; one indulges in food, sex, and spending while the other lives in self-imposed austerity. The film was inspired by poet Jang Jung Ill's poem "The Cook and the Anorexic."

The film won Blue Dragon Awards for Best Actress (for Bang) and Best Screenplay. It was selected as the South Korean entry for the Best Foreign Language Film at the 68th Academy Awards, but was not accepted as a nominee.

== Plot ==
The film explores the relationship of Song-hee, a chef living in apartment 301, and Yoon-hee, an anorexic writer living in apartment 302. The film begins with a detective visiting Song-hee to investigate the disappearance of Yoon-hee. The detective questions Song-hee about Yoon-hee's personal life, Song-hee claims that Yoon-hee has no interest in food or sex. He then searches Yoon-hee's empty apartment. The film shows Yoon-hee in the spaces around her home that the detective explores. The detective finds her anorexia medicine and her written work on the subject of sex.

The film goes back to when Song-hee moved into apartment 301. Yoon-hee avoids interacting with her, preferring to be left alone. Song-hee begins construction on her new apartment and Yoon-hee experiences flashbacks of her experience of sexual abuse. There is a flashback to Song-hee packing her belongings after divorcing her husband. He criticizes Song-hee's weight gain and when the film moves back to her moving into apartment 301, she expresses her desire to lose weight.

Song-hee then visits Yoon-hee with a plate of the food she made. Yoon-hee does not eat the food and instead vomits into the toilet. Meanwhile, Song-hee celebrates her independence from her ex-husband and states her commitment to going on a diet. She brings Yoon-hee food a second time. She tries to make Yoon-hee eat sausage, which she refuses to do. Song-hee asks if she has been raped and then expresses her love for sex. Yoon-hee is visibly upset by the food and vomits again which offends Song-hee who presumes Yoon-hee thinks she is disgusting for liking sex. The film goes through a compilation of Song-hee cooking and delivering food to Yoon-hee who subsequently throws the food into the trash and vomits. Song-hee catches Yoon-hee taking out the trash and sees all the food she cooked in the trash bag. She digs the food out of the trash bag and puts it all on plates in front of Yoon-hee in an attempt to force her to eat but she vomits again. Song-hee brings Yoon-hee to her apartment and apologizes for her actions and then forces Yoon-hee to eat against her will.

The film shows a flashback to Yoon-hee's life living with her mother and step-father in their family-run butcher shop. Her step-father repeatedly sexually assaulted her. She resorts to hiding from her family in a freezer, a child of a customer sees her exit the freezer and decides to enter the freezer as well. The child freezes to death. The film then moves back to Song-hee and Yoon-hee in apartment 301 and Song-hee finally understands Yoon-hee's reasoning for not eating. She commits to making food that Yoon-hee can eat but Yoon-hee continues to vomit in response to the food.

The film moves back to Song-hee's conversation with the detective and it's revealed that she killed, cooked, and fed her pet dog to her husband, which caused their divorce. Another flashback shows Song-hee still married to her husband and living her life as a housewife. They are shown as a happy couple indulging in food and sex. Their relationship deteriorates and Song-hee's relationship with food changes as she begins overeating and gaining weight. She discovers that her husband is having an affair and gains resentment for their pet dog who receives more attention than her from her husband. She serves him a meal and reveals the skull of the dog in a pot. The film then jumps to their divorce and the official's decision that Song-hee's husband would have to pay for her alimony and work.

Song-hee talks to Yoon-hee about her desire to find new ingredients to cook with and the pleasure she got from cooking her dog. Later, Yoon-hee asks if the dog suffered and undresses in front of Song-hee. She asks if she looks "tasteless", Song-hee strangles her to death and cuts up her body. The next scene shows Song-hee having dinner and she daydreams about Yoon-hee in front of her eating as well. The fridge door swings open to reveal Yoon-hee's severed head. The screen fades to black and the sentence "So, has their loneliness all ended?" appears. The final scene shows Yoon-hee speaking to Song-hee who is lying naked on her bed.

== Cast ==
- Bang Eun-jin as Song-hee, the woman in apartment 301.
- Hwang Shin-hye as Yoon-hee, the woman in apartment 302.
- Kim Chu-ryeon as the detective.
- Park Cheol-ho as Song-hee's ex-husband.
- Chang Young-joo as Yoon-hee's mother.
- Choi Jae-young as Yoon-hee's step-father.
- Lee Ji-yeon as Yoon-hee's younger self.

== Release ==
301, 302 was screened during the 18th Busan International Film Festival in 2013. The festival had 217,865 attendees. Director Park Cheol-soo had his own "Special Program" that featured his films Farewell My Darling, Green Chair, Mother, Stray Dog, and 301, 302.

The film was also screened during the 46th Berlin International Film Festival in 1996 as part of the "Panorama" section.

=== Awards and nominations ===
Award	Year	Category	Nominee	Result
Blue Dragon Film Awards	1995	Best Actress	Bang Eun-jin	Won
Blue Dragon Film Awards	1995	Best Screenplay	Lee Seo-gun	Won
Chunsa Film Art Awards	1995	Best Actress	Bang Eun-jin	Won
Korean Association of Film Critics Awards	1996	Best Actress	Bang Eun-jin	Won

== Remake ==
301, 302 was remade in 2013 by Canadian director Egidio Coccimiglio with the title Compulsion. The plot is similar to the original film but has some differences. Song-hee is Amy (Heather Graham) and Yoon-hee is Saffron (Carrie-Anne Moss). Amy is a chef and Saffron is a former child star. Instead of Saffron's trauma being caused by sexual assault, it is instead caused by her mother.

== See also ==
- List of submissions to the 68th Academy Awards for Best Foreign Language Film
- List of South Korean submissions for the Academy Award for Best Foreign Language Film
