= Bang Eun-jin =

South Korean actress and director (born 1965)

- Born: August 5, 1965 (age 61); South Korea
- Education: Kookmin University - Clothing Design; Chung-Ang University - Graduate School of Advanced Imaging Science, Multimedia & Film
- Occupations: Actress; film director; screenwriter
- Years active: 1993–present
- Agent: Miplex Entertainment

Korean name
- Hangul: 방은진
- Hanja: 方銀珍
- RR: Bang Eunjin
- MR: Pang Ŭnjin

Bang Eun-jin (Korean: 방은진; born August 5, 1965) is a South Korean actress and film director. She is best known for starring in Park Chul-soo's 301, 302 and Kim Ki-duk's Address Unknown. Bang made her feature directorial debut with Princess Aurora in 2005, and has since directed Perfect Number (2012), and Way Back Home (2013).

== Filmography ==
=== Director and screenwriter ===
- Method (2017)
- Way Back Home (2013)
- Perfect Number (2012)
- Blue Birds on the Desk (short film from omnibus If You Were Me 4, 2008)
- Puff the Rice (short film, 2007)
- Princess Aurora (2005)
- Ain't No Maid (short film, 2004)

=== Actress ===
==== Film ====
- The Naked Kitchen (2009) (cameo)
- A Light Sleep (2009) (cameo)
- Crush and Blush (2008)
- Bleach (2008)
- Nowhere to Turn (2008) (voice cameo)
- Tool (2006)
- Salt: Korean Railway Women Workers Story (2003)
- Rewind (2002)
- Road Movie (2002)
- My Beautiful Days (2002)
- No Comment (2002)
- Scent of Love (2001)
- Address Unknown (2001)
- Doomealee, The Very First Step (2000)
- Gui: A Space between Two Deaths (2000)
- Subrosa (2000)
- Black Hole (2000)
- The Uprising (1999)
- The Wooden Closet (1998)
- Rub Love (1998)
- Birdcage Inn (1998)
- Reclaiming Our Names (1998)
- Push! Push! (1997)
- Do You Believe in Jazz? (1997)
- Farewell My Darling (1997)
- Seven Reasons Why Beer is Better Than a Lover (1996)
- 301, 302 (1995)
- Mom, the Star and the Sea Anemone (1994)
- The Taebaek Mountains (1994)

==== Television series ====
- My Too Perfect Sons (KBS2, 2009)
- Foolish Love (KBS2, 2000)
- Hill of Horses (KBS2, 2000)
- Wang Rung's Land (SBS, 2000)
- Crash Landing on You (tvN, 2019)

== Awards ==
- 2006 Golden Cinematography Awards: Best New Director (Princess Aurora)
- 2005 Women in Film Korea Awards: Woman Filmmaker of the Year (Princess Aurora)
- 2005 Korean Association of Film Critics Awards: Best New Director (Princess Aurora)
- 2002 Grand Bell Awards: Best Supporting Actress (Address Unknown)
- 1996 Korean Association of Film Critics Awards: Best Actress (301, 302)
- 1995 Blue Dragon Film Awards: Best Actress (301, 302)
- 1995 Chunsa Film Art Awards: Best Actress (301, 302)
- 1993 Baeksang Arts Awards: Best New Actress
- 1992 Seoul Performing Arts Festival: Best Actress

== Other activities ==
- 2010 Full-time faculty at College of Convergence Culture and Arts, Sungshin Women's University
- 2010 9th Mise-en-scène Short Film Festival - Jury chairman
- 2009 11th Seoul International Youth Film Festival - Jury
- 2006 7th Jeonju International Film Festival - Jury, Indie Vision section
- 2004 Adjunct professor of Film at Seoul Institute of the Arts
