= B.E.D. (film) =

Bed
- Film poster
- Hangul: 베드
- RR: Bedeu
- MR: Pedŭ
- Directed by: Park Chul-soo
- Written by: Seo Kyung-sook
- Based on: B.E.D by Kwon Ji-ye
- Produced by: Oh Young-hwan; Ryu Hyeon-jin
- Starring: Jang Hyuk-jin; Lee Min-a; Kim Na-mi
- Cinematography: Oh Seung-hwan
- Edited by: Im Cheol-min
- Music by: Oh Soo-jin
- Distributed by: Mountain Pictures
- Release dates: 7 October 2012 (Busan International Film Festival); 12 March 2015 (South Korea)
- Running time: 91 minutes
- Country: South Korea
- Language: Korean

Bed (also stylized as B.E.D. and B-E-D) is a 2012 South Korean erotic romance film directed by Park Chul-soo, based on the short story of the same name by novelist Kwon Ji-ye. Starring theater actors Jang Hyuk-jin, Lee Min-a and Kim Na-mi, the film is an erotic relationship drama about three people. B, whose life "begins on the bed and ends on the bed", has an affair with married woman E and later, after she breaks up with him, he marries D, a single mother and career woman. The film features frequent full-frontal nudity.

B-E-D made its world premiere at the 17th Busan International Film Festival in 2012, and was released in theaters on March 12, 2015.

== Plot ==
E is everything to B. B is desperate because he knows he can't get enough of E. E wants to be liberated from her everyday boredom. She needs change. However, she doesn't want to cross the borders of her own life. D needs a comfortable family. D tries to be realistic and rational. The stories of three characters whose joy, passion and despair overflow in one bed are tangled like a puzzle, and a fearless and unhesitating exploration of human desires.

== Cast ==
- Jang Hyuk-jin as B
- Lee Min-a as E
- Kim Na-mi as D
- Noh Yoon-ah
- Lee Seong-wook
- Bae Jang-soo

== See also ==
- Nudity in film (East Asian cinema since 1929)
