= Eum Moon-suk =

South Korean actor and singer (born 1982)

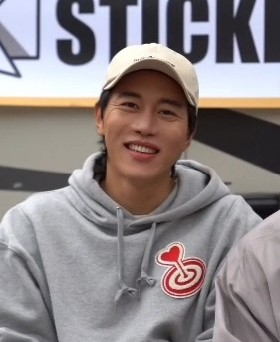
- Eum in 2020
- Born: 7 December 1982 (age 43); Asan, South Korea
- Occupations: Actor; singer
- Years active: 2005–present
- Agent: Ghost Studio
- Musical career
- Also known as: SIC
- Genres: K-pop; dance
- Instrument: Vocals
- Years active: 2005–present
- Member of: Monsterz

Korean name
- Hangul: 음문석
- RR: Eum Munseok
- MR: Ŭm Munsŏk
- Website: Official website

Eum Moon-suk (Korean: 음문석; born 7 December 1982), also known by stage name SIC, is a South Korean actor and singer. He is best known for his roles in the television series The Fiery Priest (2019), Backstreet Rookie (2020), and Hello, Me! (2021), as well as the films Pipeline (2021) and The Roundup (2022).

== Filmography ==
=== Film ===
Year	Title	Role	Notes	Ref.
2016	Ahwaer		Short film	
2017	Follosing	Director		
2017	Confidential Assignment	Troop#4		
2018	On Your Wedding Day	American football senior		
2021	Pipeline	Jeob-sae		
2022	The Roundup	Jang Ki-cheol		
2022	6/45	Captain Kang		
2026	Hope	Yang-bae		

=== Television series ===
Year	Title	Role	Notes	Ref.
2017	Whisper			
2019	The Fiery Priest	Jang-ryong		
2020	Tell Me What You Saw	Kang Dong-sik		
2020	Backstreet Rookie	Han Dal-shik		
2021	Hello, Me!	Anthony / Yang Chun-sik		
2022	Café Minamdang	Dae-tong	Cameo (episode 10)	
2022	Good Job	Yang Jin-mo		
2024	The Midnight Studio	Baek Nam-gu		
2025	Taxi Driver 3	Cheon Gwang-jin	Ep 7–8	

=== Television shows ===
Year	Title	Role	Notes	Ref.
2013	Dancing 9	Captain of Blue Eye	Season 1	
2020	My Little Old Boy	Cast member	Episode 173–174	
2021	Tiki-taCAR	Host		

=== Music video direction ===
Year	Music video	Artist	Ref.
2022	"My Love"	Seo In-guk feat. Ravi	

== Theater ==
Year	English title	Korean title	Role	Ref.
2023	Dream High	드림하이	Song Sam-dong	

== Discography ==
=== Albums ===
- SIC 01 (2005)
- Today (2006)

== Awards and nominations ==
Award ceremony	Year	Category	Nominee / Work	Result	Ref.
Asia Model Awards	2019	Rising Star Award	Eum Moon-suk	Won	
SBS Drama Awards	2019	Best New Actor	The Fiery Priest	Won	
Blue Dragon Film Awards	2026	Best Supporting Actor	Hope	Pending	
Buil Film Awards	2026	Best Supporting Actor	Hope	Won	
