= Painful Maturity =

- Theatrical poster to Painful Maturity
- Hangul: 아픈 성숙
- Hanja: 아픈 成熟
- RR: Apeun seongsuk
- MR: Ap'ŭn sŏngsuk
- Directed by: Park Chul-soo
- Written by: Kang Dae-ha
- Produced by: Choe Chun-ji
- Starring: Yun Sang-mi; Yu In-chon; Yoon Il-bong
- Cinematography: Lee Suck-ki
- Edited by: Kim Chang-sun
- Music by: Jeong Min-seob
- Distributed by: Yun Bang Films Co., Ltd
- Release date: December 26, 1980
- Running time: 90 minutes
- Country: South Korea
- Language: Korean

Painful Maturity (Korean: 아픈 성숙; RR: Apeun seongsuk) is a 1980 South Korean melodrama film directed by Park Chul-soo.

== Plot ==
Su-jin, a girl prone to lapses into unconsciousness, is saved by Kyung-ho when she passes out on the street. After Kyung-ho leaves her in a hospital, he leaves on a three-month voyage. Hoping to meet him on his return, Su-jin goes to see his ship on its scheduled arrival. She passes out, and Kyung-ho is not on the ship. Jang-won, a medical student, falls in love with Su-jin during her recuperation, but must give her up when Kyung-ho returns.

== Cast ==
- Yun Sang-mi
- Yu In-chon
- Yoon Il-bong
- Jung Hye-sun
- No Jin-a
- Kim Yeon-hui
- Son Jeon
- Kim Sin-myeong
