= The Isle =

2000 South Korean arthouse film by Kim Ki-Duk

- The Isle poster
- Hangul: 섬
- RR: Seom
- MR: Sŏm
- Directed by: Kim Ki-duk
- Written by: Kim Ki-duk
- Produced by: Lee Eun
- Starring: Suh Jung; Kim Yu-seok
- Cinematography: Hwang Suh-shik
- Edited by: Kyung Min-ho
- Music by: Jeon Sang-yun
- Production company: Myung Films
- Distributed by: CJ Entertainment
- Release date: April 22, 2000
- Running time: 90 minutes
- Country: South Korea
- Language: Korean
- Budget: US$50,000
- Box office: US$20,666

The Isle (Korean: 섬) is a 2000 South Korean arthouse film written and directed by Kim Ki-duk, his fourth film, and the first to receive wide international acclaim for his now recognizable style. The film has gained notoriety for gruesome scenes that caused some viewers to vomit or faint when the film premiered at the Venice Film Festival. The movie step among range of distinctive movie genres, making it difficult to classify into one solely traditional genre. Spending from psychological drama, romance, thriller, horror and mystery.

The Isle stars Suh Jung and Kim Yu-seok as an unlikely couple who develop a love for each other despite their unusual circumstances. Like all of Ki-Duk's other movies it has almost no dialog, relying mostly on its visual storytelling.

== Plot ==
Suh Jung plays the mute Hee-jin, who operates a fishing resort, where she rents out small floating cottages and ferries her customers back and forth between land and the floats, controlling the only means of transport around. She also dispassionately takes care of her customers' needs by selling supplies, providing prostitutes from a local dabang or occasionally acting as one herself. However, when a man running from the law, Hyun-shik (Kim Yu-seok), comes to the resort, a bond starts to form between them.

At the start of the film, Hyun-shik arrives at the resort and is ferried to his float by Hee-jin. There is nothing unusual about their business relationship from the onset, but eventually Hee-jin is intrigued by Hyun-shik's obviously troubled past. When visiting his float one time, Hee-jin still resists Hyun-shik's forceful advances but does call in a prostitute to service him. Hyun-shik, however, only wants companionship from the prostitute and a relationship starts to form between them.

The two developing relationships between Hyun-shik and the prostitute and Hyun-shik and Hee-jin move the plot. Hee-jin looks after Hyun-shik, even saving him from two suicide attempts, the second one accomplished gruesomely by swallowing a string of fish hooks. The prostitute continues to take more and more time off her schedule to visit Hyun-shik, oblivious to his troubles and eventually Hee-jin becomes jealous. During one visit, Hee-jin ferries the prostitute to an empty float instead of Hyun-shik's, ties her up and duct tapes her mouth shut, which eventually leads to her death as she falls into the water. The next morning Hee-jin finds her drowned and submerges her body tied to her motorbike. The prostitute's pimp, who comes to find out what's happening, falls in the water after a fight with Hyun-shik. Hee-jin appears in the water and kills the pimp. He is then submerged near the prostitute.

After the murders, Hyun-shik's and Hee-jin's relationship stalls. Hyun-shik wants to leave the resort, but Hee-jin, who controls the only boat won't let him. When he attempts to swim out, Hee-jin has to save him and take him back to his float. Hyun-shik takes the boat and is set to leave. Hee-jin apparently attempts suicide in an effort to stop him by stuffing fish hooks into her vagina and falling into the water. This time it's Hyun-shik's turn to save her, by reeling her in with the still attached hooks.

Hyun-shik and Hee-jin continue their troubled relationship. A prostitute accidentally kicks a man's Rolex into the water, infuriating him. He calls divers to have them retrieve the watch. The divers discover the bodies of the prostitute and the pimp while Hee-jin and Hyun-shik wordlessly take off on his float. The film concludes in enigmatic fashion.

== Reception ==
Like most of the director Kim Ki-duk's films, The Isle was not well received in his native country. However, the film and its controversial elements caused some stir in the film festivals it appeared in, causing it to be picked up by others in the process. The film was one of the first Korean films to be presented in the competition category of the Venice Film Festival, following Im Kwon-taek's Surrogate Woman, and Jang Sun-woo's Lies.

The Isle currently holds a 61/100 on Metacritic, and Rotten Tomatoes reports 76% of reviewers as positive; according to the latter aggregator, the critics' consensus is: "A compelling and oddly haunting combination of brutal and beautiful imagery." During its initial screenings, the film gained notoriety through reports of people vomiting or passing out during the viewing. The film was eventually awarded a NETPAC special mention in the festival.

In his review of the film, Roger Ebert, having seen the film at the 2001 Sundance Film Festival, praised the film for its cinematography, while commenting "This is the most gruesome and quease-inducing film you are likely to have seen. You may not even want to read the descriptions in this review."

The festival success of The Isle eventually led to the film getting wider releases in many countries, even though it was seemingly more suited for an art house crowd.
