= Pillar of Mist =

- Theatrical poster for Pillar of Mist (1987)
- Hangul: 안개기둥
- RR: Angaegidung
- MR: An'gaegidung
- Directed by: Park Chul-soo
- Written by: Kim Sang-su
- Produced by: Hwang Gi-seong; Jang Hyeon-ho
- Starring: Choi Myung-gil
- Cinematography: Jung Il-sung
- Edited by: Kim Hyeon
- Music by: Yi Zong-gu
- Distributed by: Hwang Ki-Seong Production
- Release date: February 28, 1987
- Running time: 115 minutes
- Country: South Korea
- Language: Korean

Pillar of Mist (Korean: 안개기둥) is a 1987 South Korean drama film directed by Park Chul-soo. It was chosen as Best Film at the Grand Bell Awards.

== Plot ==
The film is a drama about a married couple.

== Cast ==
- Choi Myung-gil as "I"
- Lee Young-ha as "Him"
- Park Jung-ja as "Her"
- Seo Kap-sook as "Her"
- O Seung-myeong as "Him"
- Im Yeong-hui as "Her"
- Lee Jeong-mi as "Child"
- Sim Jae-won as "Child"
- Choe Hyeong-seon as "Child"
- Han Chang-ho as "Child"

== Bibliography ==
- "Angae Gidung". The Complete Index to World Film. Archived from the original on 2012-04-06.
- 안개기둥. Cine21 (in Korean).

| Preceded by Mother | Grand Bell Awards for Best Film; 1986 | Succeeded by Diary of King Yeonsan |
