= Pandora: Beneath the Paradise =

2023 South Korean television series

- Promotional poster
- Hangul: 판도라: 조작된 낙원
- Hanja: 판도라: 造作된 樂園
- Lit.: Pandora: A Fabricated Paradise
- RR: Pandora: jojakdoen nagwon
- MR: P'andora: chojaktoen nagwŏn
- Genre: Revenge; Thriller
- Created by: Kim Soon-ok
- Written by: Hyun Ji-min
- Directed by: Choi Young-hoon
- Starring: Lee Ji-ah; Lee Sang-yoon; Jang Hee-jin; Park Ki-woong; Bong Tae-gyu
- Music by: Jin Ha-di
- Country of origin: South Korea
- Original language: Korean
- No. of episodes: 16

Production
- Executive producer: Kwon Byung-wook
- Producers: Yoo Si-yeon; Kang Min-kyung
- Running time: 60 minutes
- Production companies: Studio Dragon; Chorokbaem Media; Story Kim
- Budget: ₩18.6 billion

Original release
- Network: tvN
- Release: March 11 – April 30, 2023

Pandora: Beneath the Paradise (Korean: 판도라: 조작된 낙원) is a 2023 South Korean television series starring Lee Ji-ah, Lee Sang-yoon, Jang Hee-jin, Park Ki-woong, and Bong Tae-gyu. It aired on tvN from March 11 to April 30, 2023, every Saturday and Sunday at 21:10 (KST). It is also available for streaming on Disney+ in selected regions.

== Synopsis ==
The series tells the story of Hong Tae-ra (Lee Ji-ah) rising to the position of first lady in order to protect her beloved family, after completely forgetting her past memory, and to punish those who took control of her fate and shaken her.

== Cast ==
=== Main ===
- Lee Ji-ah as Hong Tae-ra / Mun Ha-gyeong / No.50
  - Chaerin as young Hong Tae-ra / Oh Young

Pyo Jae-hyun's wife who is a top-class woman who has no regrets about wealth and fame. She lost both her parents in an unfortunate accident in France, and lost her memories as a result of the accident. Mun Ha-jun's sister.

- Lee Sang-yoon as Pyo Jae-hyun

Hong Tae-ra's husband, who is the chairman of the IT company Hatch and a strong candidate for the next presidential election.

- Jang Hee-jin as Go Hae-soo
  - Ha Yul-ri as young Go Hae-soo

Jang Do-jin's wife, and the main anchor of YBC.

- Park Ki-woong as Jang Do-jin

Go Hae-soo's husband, and the management representative of the IT company Hatch.

- Bong Tae-gyu as Gu Sang-chan

The research director of the IT company Hatch.

=== Supporting ===
==== People around Hong Tae-ra and Pyo Jae-hyun ====
- Han Soo-yeon as Hong Yu-ra

A fashion entrepreneur and CEO of fashion brand Lapin, who is Hong Tae-ra's older sister and only family member.

- Kim Si-woo as Pyo Ji-woo

Pyo Jae-hyun and Hong Tae-ra's daughter.

==== People around Go Hae-soo and Jang Do-jin ====
- Cha Kwang-soo as Go Tae-seon

Go Hae-soo's deceased father, who is a 25th presidential election and a former Minister of Strategy and Finance.

- Kim Su-jeong as Gong Ja-young

Go Hae-soo's mother.

- Kim Ra-on as Jang Leo

Jang Do-jin and Go Hae-soo's son.

==== People at Hanul Psychiatric Hospital ====
- Shim So-young as Kim Seon-deok

Director of Hanul Psychiatric Hospital.

- Gong Jeong-hwan as Jo Gyu-tae

The head of Hanul Psychiatric Hospital.

==== People at Keumjo Group ====
- Ahn Nae-sang as Jang Geum-mo

Jang Do-jin's father, and the chairman of the Keumjo Group.

- Kyeon Mi-ri as Min Young-hwi

Jang Do-jin's mother, and the hostess of the Keumjo Group.

- Hong Woo-jin as Jang Gyo-jin

Jang Do-jin's older brother and the successor of the Keumjo Group.

- Seong Chang-hoon as Eom Sang-bae

Jang Geum-mo's right-hand man.

- Song Ah-kyung as Eun Yon-sil

A butler who helps Min Young-hwi.

=== Others ===
- Jung Jae-seong as Han Kyung-rok

The leader of the People's Party and 29th presidential candidate.

- Kwon Hyun-bin as Cha Pil-seung / Mun Ha-jun / No.105

A bodyguard who assists Hong Tae-ra. Mun Ha-gyeong's brother.

- Go Yun-bin as Yang Se-jin

The chief researcher of Hatch.

- Heo Jae-ho as Oh Young-guk

Pyo Jae-hyun's Election campaign head of election countermeasures headquarters.

- Han Kang-ho as Chairman Chung

Pyo Jae-hyun's Election campaign committee chairman.

- Jang Won-young as Bong Woo-ri

Pyo Jae-hyun's Election campaign head of the department in charge of Tae-ra's outfit and image at the election camp.

- Ahn Tae-hwan as Park Jun-ho

Journalist at YBC.

- Go Han-min as Song PD

PD of the YBC press department.

- Kim Min-young as Park Soo-jeong

== Production ==
=== Release ===
On February 16, 2023, tvN released stills of Lee Ji-ah. On February 21, stills of Lee Sang-yoon were released. A day later, family photo stills featuring Lee Ji-ah, Lee Sang-yoon, and Kim Si-woo were released. The teaser videos were released on January 27, February 2, February 10, and February 17.

== Viewership ==
Pandora: Beneath the Paradise : South Korea viewers per episode (thousands)

| Season | Episode number | | | | | | | | | | | | | | | | Average |
| Season | 1 | 2 | 3 | 4 | 5 | 6 | 7 | 8 | 9 | 10 | 11 | 12 | 13 | 14 | 15 | 16 | Average |
|---|---|---|---|---|---|---|---|---|---|---|---|---|---|---|---|---|---|
| 1 | 1192 | 1405 | 849 | 888 | 724 | 933 | 786 | 999 | 609 | 952 | 620 | 796 | 759 | 991 | 804 | 963 | 892 |

Source: Audience measurement performed nationwide by Nielsen Korea.

Average TV viewership ratings
| Ep. | Original broadcast date | Average audience share (Nielsen Korea) | |
| Ep. | Original broadcast date | Nationwide | Seoul |
|---|---|---|---|
| 1 | March 11, 2023 | 4.891% (1st) | 6.074% (1st) |
| 2 | March 12, 2023 | 5.707% (1st) | 5.635% (1st) |
| 3 | March 18, 2023 | 3.877% (1st) | 4.076% (1st) |
| 4 | March 19, 2023 | 4.057% (1st) | 3.810% (1st) |
| 5 | March 25, 2023 | 3.342% (1st) | 3.891% (1st) |
| 6 | March 26, 2023 | 4.300% (1st) | 4.460% (1st) |
| 7 | April 1, 2023 | 3.617% (1st) | 3.891% (1st) |
| 8 | April 2, 2023 | 4.447% (2nd) | 4.608% (2nd) |
| 9 | April 8, 2023 | 2.880% (1st) | 3.289% (2nd) |
| 10 | April 9, 2023 | 4.026% (2nd) | 4.170% (2nd) |
| 11 | April 15, 2023 | 3.219% (1st) | 3.379% (1st) |
| 12 | April 16, 2023 | 3.616% (2nd) | 3.645% (2nd) |
| 13 | April 22, 2023 | 3.469% (1st) | 3.645% (1st) |
| 14 | April 23, 2023 | 4.490% (2nd) | 4.307% (2nd) |
| 15 | April 29, 2023 | 3.737% (1st) | 3.948% (1st) |
| 16 | April 30, 2023 | 4.430% (1st) | 4.378% (2nd) |
| Average | | 4.007% | 4.200% |
In the table above, the blue numbers represent the lowest ratings and the red numbers represent the highest ratings.; This drama aired on a cable channel/pay TV which normally has a relatively smaller audience compared to free-to-air TV/public broadcasters (KBS, SBS, MBC, and EBS).
