= Lee Young-ha (actor) =

South Korean actor

- Born: January 17, 1950 (age 76); Daejeon, South Korea
- Education: Chung-Ang University – Theater and Film; Korea University Graduate School of Journalism and Mass Communication – Master's degree
- Occupation: Actor
- Years active: 1977–present
- Spouse: Sunwoo Eun-sook (m. 1981; div. 2007)

Korean name
- Hangul: 이영하
- RR: I Yeongha
- MR: I Yŏngha

Lee Young-ha (born January 17, 1950) is a South Korean actor. He was a theater actor from 1969 until 1977, when he made his onscreen debut. Best known for his leading roles in Pillar of Mist, We Are Going to Geneva Now, and Only Because You Are a Woman, Lee remained active in film and television for the next three decades. In 2010 he returned to the stage to star in the Hur Jin-ho-directed play A Nap.

Lee was married to actress Sunwoo Eun-sook for 26 years until their divorce in 2007. One of their two sons, Lee Sang-won, is also an actor. Lee and Sunwoo both enjoyed the spotlight in the 1970s and 1980s and got married in 1981 at the peak of their careers. The two have since become veteran actors who continue to act in TV dramas.

== Filmography ==
=== Film ===
- My Tutor Friend 2 (2007)
- Paradise Lost (1998)
- Robinson Crusoe '97 (1997)
- Mom, the Star, and the Sea Anemone (1995)
- Sado Sade Impotence (1994)
- Myong-Ja Akiko Sonia (1992)
- Theresa's Lover (1991)
- Tears of Seoul (1991)
- Mud Flat (1991)
- Only Because You Are a Woman (1990)
- All For You (1989)
- Woo-dam-ba-ra (1989)
- The Wolf's Curiosity Stole Pigeons (1989)
- Today's Woman (1989)
- Honeymoon (1989)
- We Are Going to Geneva Now (1988)
- That Last Winter (1988)
- Y's Experience (1987)
- The Hero Returns (1987)
- Sorrow (1987)
- Pillar of Mist (1987)
- Invisible Man (1986)
- Days of Seduction (1986)
- With Her Eyes and Body (1986)
- Wedding Night Misunderstanding (1986)
- Colorful Scandal (1986)
- Street of Desire (1986)
- Rain Falling on Youngdong Bridge (1986)
- Swamp of the Goddess (1985)
- Fire Women Village (1985)
- Love Song (1984)
- A Drinking Glass and Lips (1984)
- When A Woman Applies Makeup Twice (1984)
- I Want to Go (1984)
- Kyung-ah's Private Life (1983)
- A Woman's Outing (1983)
- Unforgettable First Love (1983)
- A Time To Love, A Time To Part (1983)
- Dancing Snail (1983)
- Crying in a Butterfly's Embrace (1983)
- Night of a Sorceress (1982)
- Jin-ah's Rose Eaten By Bugs (1982)
- I Did Love (1982)
- Slave of Love (1982)
- Winter Hunting (1982)
- Abengo Airborne Corps (1982)
- Dear Friend, Please Leave Quietly (1981)
- 26 x 365 = 0 (Sequel) (1982)
- The Carriage Running into the Winter (1982)
- The Invited Ones (1981)
- A Colorful Woman (1981)
- A Battle Journal (1981)
- Freezing Point '81 (1981)
- Goodbye, Dad '81 (1981)
- Echoes (1981)
- Mrs. Kangbyeon (1981)
- Winter Love (1980)
- Wild Woman (1980)
- The Bird of Fire (1980)
- The Story of Murim Wicked Man (1980)
- Vicious Woman (1980)
- Woman I Abandoned II (1980)
- You Are My Destiny (1980)
- Woman on Vacation (1980)
- Spring Rain in Winter (1980)
- The Other's Room (1980)
- Confessions of a College Girl (1980)
- The Happiness of an Unhappy Woman (1979)
- The Rain at Night (1979)
- The Last Cup of Tea (1979)
- The Twelve Boarders (1979)
- Wound (1978)
- The Sound of Laughter (1978)
- The Last Winter (1978)
- A Seashore Village (1978)
- Miss Yang's Adventure (1978)
- The Door (1978)
- Splendid Outing (1978)
- Mischief's Marching Song (1977)

=== Television drama ===
- Late Night Restaurant (SBS / 2015)
- You Are the Only One (KBS1 / 2014–2015)
- Welcome Rain to My Life (SBS / 2012)
- Ojakgyo Family (KBS2 / 2011–2012)
- Iron Daughters-in-Law (MBC / 2011)
- Gloria (MBC / 2010)
- Love Marriage (KBS2 / 2008)
- Golden Age of Daughters-in-law (KBS2 / 2007–2008)
- Merry Mary (MBC / 2007)
- H.I.T (MBC / 2007)
- Barefoot Love (SBS / 2006)
- Which Star Are You From? (MBC / 2006)
- Bizarre Bunch (KBS1 / 2005–2006)
- Rules of Love (MBC / 2005)
- Sad Love Story (MBC / 2005)
- I'm Sorry, I Love You (KBS2 / 2004)
- Snow White: Taste Sweet Love (KBS2 / 2004)
- Heaven's Fate (MBC / 2004–2005)
- Breathless (MBC / 2003)
- Sang Doo! Let's Go to School (KBS2 / 2003)
- The Bean Chaff of My Life (MBC / 2003)
- Fox and Cotton Candy (MBC / 2001)
- Way of Living: Couple (SBS / 2001)
- I Still Love You, Sunmi (SBS / 2001)
- Still Love (SBS / 2001)
- Promise (KBS1 / 2001)
- She's the One (KBS2 / 2000)
- We Saw a Little Lost Bird (KBS2 / 1999)
- Is Time The Only Thing That Flows? (MBC / 1999)
- Paper Crane (KBS / 1998)
- Embrace (SBS / 1998)
- Romance (SBS / 1998)
- Seoul Tango (SBS / 1998)
- Love (MBC / 1998)
- Legendary Ambition (KBS2 / 1998)
- Cinderella (MBC / 1997)
- Open Your Heart (MBC / 1996)
- Mangang (SBS / 1996)
- Woman Riding a Bicycle (SBS / 1996)
- Korea Gate (SBS / 1995)
- Suk-hee (MBC / 1995)
- Way of Living: Woman (SBS / 1994)
- Work and Love (SBS / 1993)
- Ways of Love (MBC / 1993)
- Thirty One Year Old Rebellion (KBS2 / 1993)
- Wind in the Grass (MBC / 1992)
- Erased Woman (KBS2 / 1989)
- The Fifth Row (MBC / 1989)
- Joy of Love (KBS2 / 1988)
- Woman's Heart (KBS2 / 1988)
- Nursing Ward (KBS2 / 1984)
- Ordinary People (KBS2 / 1982)
- Losing on Lake Leman (KBS / 1980)
- Master (MBC / 1978)
- The Door to Happiness (KBS / 1977)

== Theater ==
- Annie (2010)
- A Nap (2010)

== Awards ==
- 2003 KBS Drama Awards: Best Actor in a Comic Role (Sang Doo! Let's Go to School)
- 1991 Grand Bell Awards: Best Actor (Only Because You Are a Woman)
- 1990 영화평론가상: Best Actor (Only Because You Are a Woman)
- 1989 Baeksang Arts Awards: Most Popular Actor (TV) (Honeymoon)
- 1987 Grand Bell Awards: Best Actor (We Are Going to Geneva Now)
- 1986 영화평론가상: Best Actor
- 1986 Grand Bell Awards: Best Actor (Pillar of Mist)
- 1986 Baeksang Arts Awards: Best Actor (Fire Women Village)
- 1985 한국연극영화TV예술상: Best Actor (Fire Women Village)
- 1977 한국연극영화TV예술상: Best New Actor (TV) (The Door to Happiness)
- 1970 Seorabeol Film Festival: Best Actor (Wings)
