= Green Chair =

- Poster to Green Chair (2005)
- Hangul: 녹색 의자
- Hanja: 綠色 椅子
- RR: Noksaek uija
- MR: Noksaek ŭija
- Directed by: Park Chul-soo
- Written by: Kim Jun-han; Park Chul-soo
- Produced by: Lee Jung-ho
- Starring: Suh Jung; Shim Ji-ho
- Cinematography: Lee Eun-gil
- Edited by: Oh Young-hwan
- Music by: Eeubuu Project
- Distributed by: Park Chul-Soo Films Ltd.
- Release date: June 10, 2005
- Running time: 98 minutes
- Country: South Korea
- Language: Korean
- Budget: US$2,000,000

Green Chair (Korean: 녹색 의자) is a South Korean drama film directed by Park Chul-soo, that was released in 2005. It is about an affair between an attractive thirty-two-year-old woman and a youth just short of legal majority. Interlaced with explicit scenes of love making, the movie watches the two lovers trying to come to grips with their mutual attraction, sexuality and societal disapproval.

This Mirovision film is in color on 35 mm film and runs 98 minutes. The production budget was US$2,000,000.

It was a 2005 Sundance Film Festival Official Selection, a 2005 Berlin Film Festival selection and was also shown as the opening movie at the Los Angeles Korean International Film Festival in the same year. A DVD with English and Korean sub-titles came out in 2005 and is accompanied by a second disk on making of the film. Running time is listed as 103 minutes.

ImaginAsian Pictures acquired the rights for the film in North America. A release was expected in late 2007.

== Plot ==
Kim Mun-hee is a 32-year-old divorced woman. She engages in an affair with 19-year-old Seo-hyun, who considers Kim to be his first love. However, under Korean law, the age of consent for sex is 20.

Kim is arrested and has to spend a few days in prison for seduction of a minor, before she is set free and sentenced to do some hours of community service. When she is released, the press and Seo-hyun wait for her outside the prison.

Kim and Seo-hyun rent a room and stay there for some time, spending much of their time having sex. Kim slowly starts to understand that this relationship won't work forever, and wants to split up with Seo-hyun. But he insists that he really loves her, and that he won't let her go. The two find shelter at the home of a friend of Mun-hee, Su-jin.

== Cast ==
- Suh Jung as Kim Mun-hee
- Shim Ji-ho as 19-year-old Seo-hyun
- Oh Yoon-hong as Su-jin
- Jeon-han Kim as journalist
- Jung-hee Nam as Kim Mun-hee's grandmother

== See also ==
- List of Korean films
