= Pipeline (film) =

2021 South Korean crime action film

- Theatrical release poster
- Hangul: 파이프라인
- RR: Paipeurain
- MR: P'aip'ŭrain
- Directed by: Yoo Ha
- Screenplay by: Kim Kyoung-chan; Yoo Ha
- Produced by: Lee Sung-jin; Yoon Hong-jun
- Starring: Seo In-guk; Lee Soo-hyuk; Eum Moon-suk
- Production companies: GOM Pictures; Movera Pictures
- Distributed by: CJ Entertainment; Little Big Pictures; Megabox JoongAng PlusM; Finecut Co., Ltd.
- Release date: May 26, 2021
- Running time: 108 minutes
- Country: South Korea
- Language: Korean
- Box office: US$1 million

Pipeline (Korean: 파이프라인) is a 2021 South Korean crime action film directed by Yoo Ha and starring Seo In-guk, Lee Soo-hyuk and Eum Moon-suk. The heist film tells the story of six thieves who wish to change their lives by stealing oil hidden in a tunnel dozens of meters underground in Korea. The film was released theatrically on May 26, 2021.

== Synopsis ==
Korea has over 1,200 km of oil pipeline, which is lifeline of the country. A drilling engineer prodigy (Seo In-guk) spearheads an oil heist to drill into this pipeline against heavy odds fighting catastrophic explosion and corporate greed.

Geon-woo (Lee Soo-hyuk), a rich oil refining company owner, sets up a plan to steal oil from pipeline between Honam and Seoul-Busan highway within a month. Pin Dol (Seo In-guk), the drilling engineer forms a team with Jeob-sae (Eum Moon-Suk), section chief Na (Yoo Seung-mok), Geun-sab (Tae Hang-ho) and Counter (Bae Da-bin) to complete the impossible heist. As the task gets delayed from various setbacks, the risks multiply.

== Cast ==
- Seo In-guk as Pin Dol-yi, drilling engineer
- Lee Soo-hyuk as Geon-woo, operation designer
- Eum Moon-suk as Jeob-sae, welder
- Yoo Seung-mok as Chief Na, under ground geography mapper
- Tae Hang-ho as Geun-sab, human excavator
- Bae Da-bin as monitor counter
- Bae Yoo-ram as Man-sik
- Seo Dong-won as Ji Dae-han
- Jung Jae-kwang as Sang-goo
- Shim So-young as Bong-soo's mother
- Kim Yeon-kyo as Section chief Na's daughter
- Yong Jin as 'Straw' subordinate 2
- Woo Kang-min as Patrol team leader
- Kang Doo-hyeon as Ae-song-i

== Production ==
=== Casting ===
In July 2019, the cast of film was finalized. Seo In-guk was cast as protagonist playing drilling engineer. Seo In-guk and Lee Soo-hyuk previously appeared together in 2014 tvN drama series High School King of Savvy, 2021 series Doom at Your Service and now Pipeline.

=== Filming ===
Principal photography began on July 23, 2019, and was wrapped up on November 12, 2019. The film was planned to release in 2020, but its release was postponed due to the resurgence of the COVID-19 pandemic.

== Reception ==
=== Box office ===
The film was released on May 26, 2021, on 776 screens. In its first week of release, it ranked number 1 among the Korean films released and number 3 among all the films released on the Korean box office.

According to Korean Film Council data†, it is at 19th place among all the Korean films released in the year 2021, with gross of US$1.03 million and 139,818 admissions, as of December 12, 2021.

- †The system of KOBIS (Korean Box Office Information System) is managed by KOFIC.

=== Critical response ===
Yang So-young, writing for Daily Economic Star, opined that the material of the film is fresh, but the presentation of narrative is obvious. Yang wrote that though realistic visuals have been created with the oil pipeline background but as content of the film it was not handled as well. He praised the performance of ensemble cast and concluded as, ".. even the unobtrusive storytelling and the characters as if they were seen from anywhere, the fresh charm falls. The great flow of the story itself is not very different from the crime entertainment movies we have seen so far."

Kim Ji-eun of Newsis agreed with Yang and wrote that although idea of oil stealing is new but it is a typical caper film. As regards to acting she wrote, "Pindol, played by Seo In-guk and smirk, lacks the taste of words, and Eum Moon-seok's suffix which is not necessary to say if it's a comical acting, has a poor humor code and only appears as a weak body gag." Concluding she wrote, "The energy of the site, which went through the tunnel without dying, is transmitted intact."

Yoo Na reviewing the film for YTN opined that the film has followed the typical and dull pattern of a caper film. She wrote that the story is ordinary and characters have no charm. Concluding the review Yoo Na penned, "Like a B-class black comedy, it burns action, body gags, and passion, but in the end, it did not provide emotion or fun."

Kim Ji-won writing for Ten Asia described the film as, "It is entertaining to say that it is boring, and laughter does not burst to say that it is pleasant." She wrote that there was no chemistry among characters and acting looked clumsy. Concluding, she wrote, "Was director Yooha inexperienced because it was not the genre he was good at, but the genre he challenged anew? The degree of fun is ambiguous."

== International release ==
Pipeline was released in select California theaters on May 28, 2021, and in Singapore on June 3. In addition it is sold to 815 Pictures (the United States), Klockworx (Japan), Deep Joy Picture Corporation (Taiwan), and Clover Films Distribution, who will release it in Singapore, Vietnam, Malaysia, Philippines, Indonesia, Thailand, Laos, Cambodia, and Myanmar. It is expected to release in Vietnam and Malaysia in June itself.

The film was screened at 10th Korean Film Festival Frankfurt on October 21, 2021.
