= Sunwoo Eun-sook =

South Korean actress (born 1959)

- Born: December 24, 1959 (age 66); Seoul, South Korea
- Education: Seoul Institute of the Arts - Broadcasting and Entertainment
- Occupation: Actress
- Years active: 1978–present
- Agent: Steit Entertainment
- Spouses: Lee Young-ha (m. 1981; div. 2007) Yoo Young-jae (m. 2022; div. 2024)
- Children: 2

Korean name
- Hangul: 선우은숙
- RR: Seonu Eunsuk
- MR: Sŏnu Ŭnsuk

Sunwoo Eun-sook (Korean: 선우은숙; born December 24, 1959) is a South Korean actress. Sunwoo made her acting debut in 1978, and rose to fame in the 1980s.

== Personal life ==
Sunwoo married actor Lee Young-ha in 1981 when they were both at the peak of their careers; they divorced in 2007 after 26 years of marriage. Sunwoo and Lee have two sons, one of whom is also an actor, Lee Sang-won.

On October 11, 2022, Sunwoo's agency stated that Sunwoo had registered her marriage with announcer Yoo Young-jae. On April 5, 2024, her agency confirmed the couple's divorce.

== Filmography ==
=== Television series ===
Year	Title	Role	Network
1979	The Young Zelkova Tree		KBS1
1980	Hope	Shin Sun-hee	KBS1
1981	Sinchon Eoksuni		KBS
1981	Great Vocation		KBS1
1981	Eunhasu (Milky Way)	Kyung-ah	KBS1
1981	A Halo Around the Moon	Ji-sook	KBS2
1981	Pray for Blessings on Us		KBS1
1982	Flower Carriage		KBS2
1983	Eun-ha's Dream		KBS1
1983	Eldest Daughter		KBS1
1983	Geum-nam's House		KBS2
1983	Foundation of the Kingdom	Princess Noguk	KBS1
1984	TV Tale of Chunhyang	Sung Chunhyang	KBS2
1986	How Can I Forget My Hometown?		KBS
1986	My Heart Is Like a Star	Lee Ok-rye	KBS2
1987	Lee Cha-don		KBS1
1987	Land	Wol-sun	KBS1
1990	The Servant Girl and Gainae	Dae-soon	KBS2
1990	Dark Sky Dark Bird	Shin-hee	MBC
1991	Thief's Wife	Young-il	KBS2
1991	We Are Middle Class	Ja-ok	KBS2
1992	Your Name Is Hyo-ja	Eldest daughter Hyo-soon	KBS1
1992	Sons and Daughters	Soon-mi	MBC
1993	Adolescence	Dong-min's mother	MBC
1993	Friday's Woman: "Sunwoo Eun-sook's Rainbow Love"	Seo Ji-hye	KBS2
1995	The Road	Yoo Sun-ae	KBS2
1996	Sibling Relations	Jae-sook	MBC
1996	A Faraway Country	Park Young-hye	KBS2
1996	Sometimes Like Strangers	Myung-joo	SBS
1997	Happy Morning	Won Jung-soo's wife	KBS2
1998	Please Find My Dad		KBS1
1998	You and My Song	Soon-nyeo	KBS1
1999	Encounter	Lady Yoo	KBS2
1999	Into the Sunlight	Song Soon-ja	MBC
2000	Bad Friends	Kim Kang-seok's mother	MBC
2000	RNA	Jo Young-sook	KBS2
2000	The More I Love You	Mrs. Yoon	MBC
2000	Autumn in My Heart	Lee Kyung-ha	KBS2
2001	Delicious Proposal		MBC
2001	In the Flower Garden	Wang In-hee	KBS2
2001	Stock Flower	Lee Sook-hee	KBS2
2001	Empress Myeongseong	Lady Yi of Gamgodang	KBS2
2001	Father and Sons	Kang-ja's mother	SBS
2001	Purity	Hwang Soo-mi	KBS2
2002	Hwatu	Geum-soon	SBS
2002	Sidestreet People	Mrs. Ahn	KBS2
2002	We Are Dating Now	Tae-hee	SBS
2002	Like a Flowing River	Kim Seok-joo's aunt	SBS
2002	MBC Best Theater: "My Long-suffering Mom"	Soo-jin's mother	MBC
2003	Good News	Kim Geum-shil	MBC
2003	All In	Yoon Hye-sun	SBS
2003	Yellow Handkerchief	Oh Kyung-ae	KBS1
2003	My Fair Lady	Oh Nam-sook	SBS
2003	A Problem at My Younger Brother's House	Lee Young-joo	SBS
2004	Passion	Mrs. Im	MBC
2004	The Age of Heroes	Chun Tae-san's mother	MBC
2004	Full House	Mrs. Kim	KBS2
2005	Dangerous Love	Go Yoon-ja	KBS2
2005	That Summer's Typhoon	Oh Sung-mi	SBS
2005	Resurrection	Kim Yi-hwa	KBS2
2006	One Fine Day	Ji Soo-hyun	MBC
2007	Good Morning Shanghai	Hao Yun's mother	Hunan TV
2007	Kimchi Cheese Smile	Sunwoo Eun-sook	MBC
2008	Don't Be Swayed	Cha Young-mi	MBC
2009	Wife Returns	Mrs. Park	SBS
2010	Marry Me, Please	Lee Young-shin	KBS2
2011	Dangerous Woman	Na Yeon-sook	MBC
2012	Can We Get Married?	Eun-kyung	jTBC
2013	Empire of Gold	Yoo Soon-ok	SBS
2014	The Noblesse'	Bang Jung-shim	jTBC
2014	You're Only Mine	Na Soon-shim	SBS
2016	Bubbly Lovely	Im Soon-bok	SBS
2017	Return of Fortunate Bok	Park Mi-ok	MBC
2022	Gold Mask	Kim Hye-kyung	KBS2

=== Film ===
Year	Title	Role
1980	The Woman Who Laughs Three Times	
1981	The Haunted Wedding Dress	
1982	The Hero, Pal Bul-chul	
1983	A Time to Love, a Time to Part	
1987	Prince Yeonsan	Deposed Queen Lady Yun
1997	Robinson Crusoe '97	Mom
2002	Sex Is Zero	Lee Eun-hyo's mother (cameo)
2004	My Little Bride	Bo-eun's mother
2006	A Dirty Carnival	Kim Byung-doo's mother
2018	Gate	Ok-ja

== Awards and nominations ==
Year	Award	Category	Nominated work	Result
1983	19th Baeksang Arts Awards	Best New Actress – Television	Flower Carriage	Won
