= Suh Jung =

South Korean actress

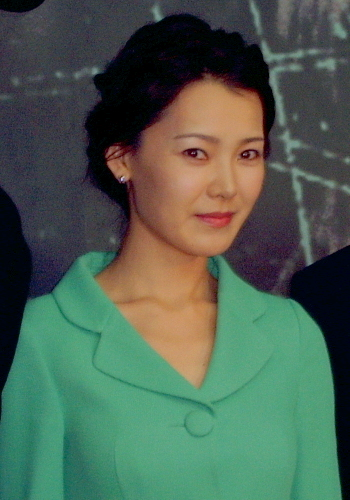
- Suh in 2004
- Born: South Korea
- Occupation: Actress

Korean name
- Hangul: 서정
- RR: Seo Jeong
- MR: Sŏ Chŏng

Suh Jung (Korean: 서정) is a South Korean actress. Suh was cast in the lead in The Isle (2000), Yellow Flower (2002), Spider Forest (2004), Green Chair (2005) and Desert Dream (2007).

== Filmography ==
=== Film ===
Year	Title	Role
2000	Peppermint Candy	
2000	The Isle	Hee-jin
2002	Yellow Flower	
2004	Spider Forest	Min Su-jin
2005	Green Chair	Kim Mun-hee
2007	Desert Dream	Choi Soon-hee
2012	Venus in Furs	Joo-won

=== Television series ===
Year	Title	Role
2001	Law Firm	Yun-jin

== Awards and nominations ==
Year	Award	Category	Nominated work	Result
2001	37th Baeksang Arts Awards	Best New Actress	The Isle	Won
2001	Fantasporto	Best Actress	The Isle	Won
2001	The 24th Korea Gold Awards Festival	Best New Actress	The Isle	Won
2000	The 2nd Cinemanila International Film Festival	Best Actress	The Isle	Won
