= Theresa's Lover =

- Film poster
- Hangul: 테레사의 연인
- Hanja: 테레사의 戀人
- RR: Teresaui yeonin
- MR: T'eresaŭi yŏnin
- Directed by: Park Chul-soo
- Written by: Park Chul-soo; Kim Byeong-deok
- Produced by: Hwang Gi-seong; Park Yong-bin
- Starring: Lee Young-ha; Hwang Shin-hye
- Cinematography: Seo Jeong-min
- Edited by: Kim Hyeon
- Music by: Shin Byung-ha
- Production companies: Hwang Ki Sung Films Co., Ltd.
- Release date: 16 November 1991
- Running time: 110 minutes
- Country: South Korea
- Language: Korean

Theresa's Lover (Korean: 테레사의 연인) is 1991 South Korean drama film by Park Chul-soo. Based on a book by Kim Byung-wook, a former music producer meets his second wife Thesesa in United States.

== Cast ==
- Lee Young-ha ... Kim Byung-wook
- Hwang Shin-hye ... Theresa
- Kim Hye-ok ... Wife
- Jeong Un-bong
- Kim Deok-nam
- Jeon Mi-seon
- Cheon Yeong-deok
- Yu Yeong-hwi
- Kim Eun-suk
- No Yeong-hwa
