= Address Unknown (2001 film) =

2001 film by Kim Ki-duk

- Film poster
- Hangul: 수취인불명
- Hanja: 受取人不明
- RR: Suchwiin bulmyeong
- MR: Such'wiin pulmyŏng
- Directed by: Kim Ki-duk
- Written by: Kim Ki-duk
- Produced by: Lee Seung-jae
- Starring: Yang Dong-geun; Ban Min-jeong; Bang Eun-jin; Cho Jae-hyun; Mitch Malem
- Cinematography: Seo Jeong-min
- Edited by: Hahm Sung-won
- Music by: Park Ho-jun
- Distributed by: Tube Entertainment
- Release date: 2 June 2001
- Running time: 117 minutes
- Country: South Korea
- Language: Korean

Address Unknown (Korean: 수취인불명) is a 2001 South Korean drama film directed by Kim Ki-duk. It was the opening film of the 2001 Venice Film Festival. The film is based on real-life stories from the director's life, and those known to him.

== Plot ==
The residents living in the South Korean countryside around a U.S. military base are affected by its presence. These include an unstable, near psychotic American soldier (Mitch Malem) who survives on a diet of LSD and rage, Eun-ok, a girl with one defective eye, Jihum a lonesome boy and Chang-guk, who lives in an old abandoned U.S. Air Force bus with his mother. She has taught Chang-guk English in an attempt to prepare him for their new life in the United States, reunited with his father whom she mails regularly, although the letters are always returned "address unknown".

== Cast ==
Dong-kun Yang - Chang-Guk

Young-min Kim - Ji-Hum

Ban Min-Jung - Eun-Ok

Jae Hyun Cho - Dog-Eye

Pang Eun-Jin - Chang-Guk's Mother

Myung Kye-Nam - Ji-Hum's Father

Jim Morse - Military Police

James Wade - Military Police

== Reception ==
The film was generally well received. Kim Ki-duk's direction throughout is excellent. His visuals capture the unremitting empty desolation of the village's surroundings. With Seo Jeong-min's cinematography, the picture looks grimy and cold, like it's been dragged across the damp, dirty ground before being processed. There's very little in the way of the pretty or picturesque, the colour palette exuding a subdued and murky feel. Also, he maintains the heavy sense of metaphor within the piece. So often do scenes go on behind closed doors, or are obscured by plastic sheeting, branches or chain-link fences. Much of it also unfolds at a distance. These characters are trapped in this place, beyond the help of others, whether they know it or not.
