= Jang Hyuk-jin =

South Korean actor (born 1971)

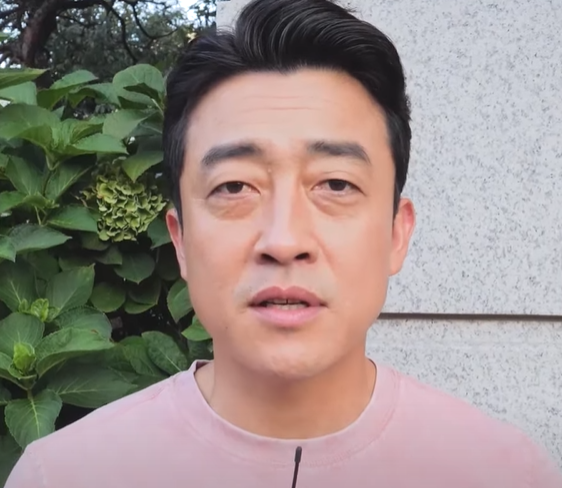
- Jang in 2021
- Born: 16 August 1971 (age 55)
- Education: Seoul Institute of the Arts – Department of Theater
- Occupation: Actor
- Years active: 1993–present
- Agent: Studio Santa Claus Entertainment

Korean name
- Hangul: 장혁진
- RR: Jang Hyeokjin
- MR: Chang Hyŏkchin

Jang Hyuk-jin (Korean: 장혁진, born Jang Seok-hyeon on 16 August 1971) is a South Korean actor. He graduated from the Seoul Institute of the Arts – Department of Theater.

== Filmography ==
=== Films ===
Year	Title	Role	Notes	Ref.
2003	Singles	Chief Ma		
2004	Arahan			
2004	A Family	Doctor		
2012	B.E.D.	B		
2013	The Fake	Gambling place man 2, Pastor, Church performer 2, Villager, Karaoke guest 2, Police 2	Animation	
2014	Venus Talk	Detective		
2015	Gangnam Blues	Junk shop owner		
2016	Train to Busan	Ki-chul		
2016	Canola	Real Estate Agent Byun		
2016	Seoul Station	Mr. Kim	Animation	
2016	Luck Key	Luxury Villa Man		
2016	Split	Golf wear man		
2017	The Senior Class	Voice of Professor Jeom Baek	Animation	
2017	New Trial	Forensic doctor		
2017	Marionette	Jo Young-jae		
2018	Snatch Up	Poker board boss 2		
2018	Unstoppable	Choi Man-sik		
2018	High Society	President Nam		
2019	Exit		Special appearance	
2022	Air Murder			
2024	Heavy Snow	Director Jang		
2024	Deadline	Choi Dong-hoon		

=== Television series ===
Year	Title	Role	Notes	Ref.
2007	Chosun Police	Park Jeong-ho		
2010	Playful Kiss			
2014	Reset	Jo Bong-hak		
2014	Misaeng: Incomplete Life	Moon Sang-pil		
2015	Splendid Politics	Moo Ro-no		
2016	Signal	Entertainment reporter		
2016	A Beautiful Mind	Kim Soo-in		
2016–2020	Dr. Romantic	Song Hyun-cheol	Seasons 1–2	
2017	Ms. Perfect	President Park		
2017	Suspicious Partner	Han Jong-goo		
2017	Save Me	Lee Kang-soo		
2017	Mad Dog	Park Moo-shin		
2017	Prison Playbook	Yoo Han-yang's father		
2018	Return			
2018	Live	Lee Joo-yeong		
2018	Lovely Horribly	Kang Tae-sik		
2018	The Hymn of Death	Dauchi		
2019	Possessed	Kim Nak-chun		
2019	VIP	Bae Do-il		
2019	Vagabond	Kim Woo-gi		
2019	The Running Mates: Human Rights	Jang Dong-seok		
2020	18 Again	Heo Woong-gi		
2020–2021	Awaken	Jang Yong-shik		
2021–present	Taxi Driver	Choi Kyung-goo	Seasons 1–2	
2021–2022	Now, We Are Breaking Up	Go Gwang-soo		
2022	Café Minamdang	Choi Young-seop		
2022	Big Mouth	Choi Jung-rak		
2022	The Golden Spoon	CEO Oh Dong-Pil		
2023	Duty After School	Kim Chi-Yeol's father	Special appearance (ep. 1)	
2023–2024	Death's Game	Squad chief		
2024	Flex x Cop	Wang Jong-Tae		
2024	The Impossible Heir	Chu Hyeok-Jin		
2024	The Escape of the Seven: Resurrection	Kim Do-Jin	Special appearance (ep. 6)	
2024	Connection	Hwang Hong-Suk		
2024	Dreaming of a Freaking Fairy Tale	Deluxe taxi driver	Special appearance (ep. 5)	
2024	Brewing Love	Lee Jang		
2025	The Winning Try	Na Gyu-won		

== Awards and nominations ==
Year presented, Name of the award ceremony, category, nominee of the award, and the result of the nomination
Award ceremony	Year	Category	Nominee / Work	Result	Ref.
SBS Drama Awards	2019	Best Character Award, Actor	VIP	Nominated	
SBS Drama Awards	2021	Best Supporting Actor in a Mini-Series Romance/Comedy Drama	Now, We Are Breaking Up	Nominated	
SBS Drama Awards	2023	Best Supporting Actor in a Miniseries Genre/Fantasy Drama	Taxi Driver 2	Won	
