= The Rain at Night =

- Theatrical poster
- Hangul: 밤이면 내리는 비
- RR: Bamimyeon naerineun bi
- MR: Pamimyŏn naerinŭn pi
- Directed by: Park Chul-soo
- Written by: Kang Dae-ha
- Based on: The Rain that Falls at Night by Park Bum-shin
- Produced by: Choi Chun-ji
- Starring: Lee Young-ha; Lee Deok-hwa; Park Geun-hyung
- Cinematography: Lee Seok-gi
- Edited by: Kim Chang-sun
- Music by: Jeong Min-seob
- Release date: September 28, 1979
- Running time: 85 minutes
- Country: South Korea
- Language: Korean

The Rain at Night (Korean: 밤이면 내리는 비) is a 1979 South Korean drama film directed by Park Chul-soo. At the 1980 Baeksang Arts Awards, Park was given a New Talent award for directing this film. The film is based on Park Bum-shin's 1975 novel of the same title.

== Plot ==
Ga-hi, a kindergarten teacher, is raped one night while on her way to meet her boyfriend, Young-woo. She later recognized her attacker as Hwang Sa-bin, a boxer, and after seeing him lose a fight begins to develop feelings towards him.

== Cast ==
- Lee Young-ha - Young-woo
- Lee Deok-hwa - Hwang Sa-bin
- Park Geun-hyung
- Son Mi-ja
- Kim Young-ran - Ga-hee
