= Taxi Driver (South Korean TV series) =

2021 South Korean television series

- Promotional poster for season 3
- Hangul: 모범택시
- Hanja: 模範택시
- Lit.: Model Taxi
- RR: Mobeomtaeksi
- MR: Mobŏmt'aeksi
- Genre: Action; Crime; Vigilante; Black comedy; Revenge
- Based on: The Deluxe Taxi (Red Cage) by: Carlos; Lee Jae-jin
- Written by: Oh Sang-ho (Note: Writer Oh Sang-ho only wrote 10 episodes of season one, while writer Lee Ji-hyun wrote the remaining episodes of the first season.); Lee Ji-hyun (season 1)
- Directed by: Park Joon-woo (season 1); Lee-dan (season 2); Jang Young-seok (season 2); Kang Bo-seung (season 3)
- Starring: Lee Je-hoon; Pyo Ye-jin; Kim Eui-sung; Esom; Jang Hyuk-jin; Bae Yoo-ram; Shin Jae-ha
- Music by: Kim Seong-yul; Park Se-joon (season 2)
- Opening theme: "Taxi Driver" by Kim Seong-yul
- Ending theme: Various
- Country of origin: South Korea
- Original language: Korean
- No. of seasons: 3
- No. of episodes: 48 + 2 special

Production
- Executive producers: Cho Sung-hoon (C.P); Jo Young-kwang (season 3)
- Producers: Hong Seung-chang; Kim Young-bae; Lee Ok-gyu (season 1); Han Jeong-hwan (season 2); Kim Si-hwan (season 3); Kim Gyeong-guk (season 3); Song Byeong-jun (season 3); Jang Won-seok (season 3)
- Production locations: South Korea; Vietnam; Japan
- Editors: Kim Yu-mi; Park Eun-mi
- Camera setup: Single-camera
- Running time: 70 minutes
- Production companies: Studio S; Group Eight; B.A. Entertainment (season 3)

Original release
- Network: SBS TV
- Release: April 9, 2021 – January 10, 2026

Taxi Driver (Korean: 모범택시) is a South Korean television series starring Lee Je-hoon, Pyo Ye-jin, Kim Eui-sung, Jang Hyuk-jin, Bae Yoo-ram, Esom and Shin Jae-ha. Based on the webtoon The Deluxe Taxi (Red Cage) by Carlos and Lee Jae-jin, the story is inspired by actual real life heinous crimes committed in Korea. The first season aired on SBS TV from April 9 to May 29, 2021. The second season aired from February 17 to April 15, 2023. The third and final season aired from November 21, 2025 to January 10, 2026. It is also available for streaming on Wavve in South Korea, on Kocowa in the Americas, and on Netflix, (Note: Season one is only available on Netflix.) Viki and Viu in selected regions.

Taxi Driver received praise from the viewers for its performances and storylines. The first-season finale episode achieved the fourth highest rating of any Friday-Saturday drama in SBS history. The second-season finale episode earned a higher rating than the previous season. It also set a new record for the highest ratings achieved by any miniseries thus far in 2023.

== Synopsis ==
=== Season 1 ===
Kim Do-gi, a former special forces soldier who works as a driver for Rainbow Taxi Company, a secret and anonymous vigilante group that offers victims seeking revenge call for justice to people that have not been punished by the law. The squad features CEO Jang Sung-chul, with hacker Ahn Go-eun and mechanics Choi Kyung-ku and Park Jin-eon. They work together to break the law and punish criminals who avoid prosecution. Prosecutor Kang Ha-na grows more suspicious of Rainbow Taxi and get pulled into their work, while an embattled Do-gi faces his past and the limit of vigilante justice.

=== Season 2 ===
After the events of the previous missions, members of the Rainbow Taxi have gone back to their normal lives, until Kim Do-gi receives an urgent request from a father whose son had been trafficked to Vietnam. The crisis pulls the group together, and they start their activities once more with more determination than ever. A new driver, On Ha-jun, comes into the company, though his presence harbors hidden consequences. As the team investigates trafficking and corruption that reach across borders, more complicated threats arise, and they start to reveal a greater conspiracy that involves themselves.

=== Season 3 ===
The Rainbow Taxi team is back for more cases that involve highly dangerous criminals, both from international syndicates and organized domestic offenders. The missions get more and more complex, with added layers of moral complication that make the team question the aftermath of their vigilante methods. Meanwhile, the relationships between members deepen, especially as Kim Do-gi faces personal loss and tests of loyalty.

== Cast and characters ==
=== Main ===
- Lee Je-hoon as Kim Do-gi

A former 707th Special Mission Group captain who works for Rainbow Taxi Company after his mother was killed.

- Esom as Kang Ha-na (season 1)

An elite prosecutor from the Seoul Northern District Prosecutors' Office. She fights for justice and later becomes interested in Do-gi's work.

- Kim Eui-sung as Jang Sung-chul

The CEO of Rainbow Taxi Company and the Director of Blue Bird, a non-profit foundation. He is ruthless to the villains, but is warm-hearted for the crime victims.

- Pyo Ye-jin as Ahn Go-eun

A skilled hacker working for Rainbow Taxi Company after her older sister committed suicide.

- Jang Hyuk-jin as Choi Kyung-ku

The lead mechanic of Rainbow Taxi Company. He was a development researcher for new automobiles in an automobile company.

- Bae Yoo-ram as Park Jin-eon

The assistant mechanic of Rainbow Taxi Company. He was an aircraft maintenance mechanic in an airline company.

- Shin Jae-ha as On Ha-jun / Kim Dan-woo (season 2)

A new driver of Rainbow Taxi Company, who is actually a member of the Geumsa Organization.

=== Supporting ===
- Cha Ji-yeon as Baek Sung-mi

The chairman of Nakwon C&C. Nicknamed "The Godmother", she is a notorious, influential figure in the underground economy.

- Yoo Seung-mok as Cho Jin-woo

The deputy chief prosecutor of the Seoul Northern District Prosecutors' Office.

- Lee Yoo-joon as Wang Min-ho

A prosecutor from the Seoul Northern District Prosecutors' Office working in Ha-na's office. He assists Ha-na in her cases.

- Yu Yeon-su as So-eun

A prosecutor from the Seoul Northern District Prosecutors' Office working in Ha-na's office.

- Lee Ho-cheol as Goo Seok-tae

Sung-mi's secretary.

- Cho Hyun-woo as Cho Do-chul

A sexual offender who was released from prison.

- Heo Jung-do as Park Dong-pil

A captain from Seoul Jongam Police Station.

- Park Jong-hwan as Park Hyeon-jo (season 2)

A high-ranking corrupt police officer and an executive of Geumsa Organization who keeps an eye on Rainbow Taxi Company.

=== Recurring ===
==== Season 1 ====
Changsung Jeotgal Factory (eps. 1-2)

- Jo In as Kang Maria

Rainbow Taxi Company's first requester. She is mentally handicapped and was unknowingly brought to work in the factory.

- Tae Hang-ho as Park Ju-chan

The general manager of the factory, who resorts to labour exploitation, illegal confinement and habitual abusing of the workers.

- Song Duk-ho as Cho Jong-geun

Ju-chan's younger brother-in-law.

- Kim Do-yeon as Choi Jong-suk

A handler who was responsible for bringing Maria to work at the factory.

- Jo Dae-hee as Kim Hyung-wook

A corrupt chief of the countryside police station, who is under Ju-chan's payroll.

Sejung High School (eps. 3-4)

- Park Joon-mok as Park Jung-min

Rainbow Taxi Company's second requester. He is a sophomore student who is frequently bullied by Park Seung-tae and his friends.

- Choi Hyun-wook as Park Seung-tae

Jung-min's schoolmate and bully.

- Lee Min-jae as Oh Hak-soo

Seung-tae's friend who helps him in bullying Jung-min.

- Lee Jae-hak as Jang Hyung-sik

Seung-tae's friend who helps him in bullying Jung-min.

U Data (eps. 5-8)

- Jeon Sung-il as Seo Young-min

A former U Data employee who was abused by Park Yang-jin. Do-gi personally accepts to seek revenge for him, which is different from the previous two cases.

- Baek Hyun-jin as Park Yang-jin

The chairman of U Data. He is frequently abusive to his employees whenever something bad happens, and even has resorted to gaslighting them.

- Cho Ha-seok as Director Jung
- Kim Jae-young as Mr. Lee

The head of department in U Data.

- Lee Da-il as Mr. Ahn

A department manager in U Data.

- Kwak Min-gyu as Jeon Jin-won

A former employee of U Data.

- Ryu Yi-jae as Ahn Jung-eun

Go-eun's older sister who has passed away.

- Seo Han-gyeol as Choi Min

Jung-eun's boyfriend.

Voice Phishing Organization (eps. 9-10)

- Shim So-young as Lim Bok-ja

The boss of a voice phishing organisation, located within a Chinese food restaurant.

- Kim Dae-gon as Madame Lim's employee

Nakwon C&C / Embassy of Bahamas (eps. 11-14)

- Lee Ho-cheol as Goo Young-tae (Note: Lee Ho-cheol played double roles in this drama.)

Seok-tae's twin brother and the junior managing director of Nakwon C&C.

- Jung Kang-hee as Shim Woo-seob
- Han Kyu-won as Go Dong-hee
- Han Hyun-ah as Lee Hye-yeon

Dong-hee's girlfriend.

- Lee Yoon-hee as Pastor Go

Dong-hee's father.

- Lee Ha-eun as Dong-hee's younger sister

Oh Chul-young (eps. 15-16)

- Yang Dong-tak as Oh Chul-young

A serial killer who murdered Sung-chul's parents and Do-gi's mother.

- Jeon Seok-chan as Kim Chul-jin

A man who was wrongfully jailed 20 years behind bars for a murder case actually committed by Chul-young.

- Ryu Sung-rok as Han Dong-chan / Oh Hyun-soo

Chul-young's son and a prison guard.

==== Season 2 ====
Vietnam Kidnap Group (eps. 1-2)

- Choi One as Lee Joon-beom

Rainbow Taxi Company's first requester (in season 2). He was searching for his missing son, Lee Dong-jae, for the past year.

- Zo Zee-an as Lee Dong-jae

A missing young man suspected to be a victim of crime.

- Yoon Seok-hyun as Sang-man

The manager of Cheongeum International.

- Kim Jeong-hoon as a tour guide
- Lee Kyu-ho as Kwon Du-sik

The boss of Cheongeum International's illegal gambling sites department.

- Park Seong-geun as Kim Hyung-sub

The head of the Seoul Northeast Police Station's violent team and the chairman of Cheongeum International.

Yongsori Village (eps. 3-4)

- Byun Joong-hee as Lee Im-soon

Rainbow Taxi Company's second requester (in season 2). She was the victim of a previous scam operation by Yoo Sang-gi.

- Ko Sang-ho as Yoo Sang-gi

A professional scammer who targets the elderly people. He purchased spoilt devices, and resold them as usable devices in order to scam victims.

- Kang Young-taek as Lee Dong-geun

A gang member who works under Sang-gi.

- Yoo Dong-hoon as Goo Jae-seung

A gang member who works under Sang-gi.

- Lee Kwang-hoon as Yong-chil

A phone seller who worked together with Sang-gi.

- Shin Kang-gyun as Lee Deok-goo

An elderly man staying in Yongsori Village, who almost became a victim of Sang-gi's scam operation.

Feel Consulting (eps. 5-6)

- Ahn Chae-heum as Hwang Seo-yeon

Rainbow Taxi Company's third requester (in season 2). She was a victim of child abuse.

- Kim Do-yoon as Kang Pil-seung

Nicknamed "Kang Pro", he is a representative of Feel Consulting who has mysophobia.

- Kwon Na-hyun as Park So-mang

Seo-yeon's adoptive younger sister.

- Jeong Young-gi as Park Joon-bin

The lead manager of Feel Consulting.

Soonbaek Cult (eps. 7-8)

- Kim Eun-bi as Lee Jin-hee

Rainbow Taxi Company's fourth requester (in season 2). She was searching for her older sister, Lee Jin-seon, who joined a cult.

- Ahn Sung-woo as Ok Joo-man

A pastor and leader of the cult pseudo-churches that are committing crimes.

- Jung Ji-woo as Lee Jin-seon

Jin-hee's sister who is a victim of a pseudo-church.

- Seo Ji-soo as Joo-man's lover

Jeil Chakhan Hospital (eps. 9-10)

- Jung Ki-seob as Han Jae-deok

Rainbow Taxi Company's fifth requester (in season 2). He is on a one-man protest against Jeil Chakhan Hospital, which put her daughter in a coma due to a medical malpractice.

- Lee Hang-na as Ahn Young-sook

The chief director of Jeil Chakhan Hospital.

- Kang Seol as Han Soo-ryeon

Jae-deok's daughter and an athlete, who is under comatose status due to a medical malpractice.

- Kim Jae-min as Gong Soo-ho

A manager of Meditopia's medical sales team. He acts as a proxy for Young-sook.

- Kim Young-jin as Manager Kim

Young-sook's close friend.

Black Sun (eps. 11-14)

- Baek Soo-jang as Kim Yong-min

Rainbow Taxi Company's sixth requester (in season 2). He formerly works as a reporter under Hanbaek Ilbo.

- Jang In-sub as Choi Seong-eun

A police officer who died while investigating the Black Sun with Yong-min.

- Kim Chae-eun as Windy

An agent of the Black Sun.

- Jeon Woon-jong as Cho Gyeong-jang

A corrupt police officer who works with the Black Sun.

- Go Geon-han as Victor

An idol and VIP member of the Black Sun.

- Lee Dal as Min Jong-seon

The head of the Black Sun guards.

- Moon Jae-won as Yoo Moon-hyeon

The manager of the Black Sun.

- Jeon Jun-ho as No. 12

Black Sun guard.

- Yoo Ji-yeon as Yang Mi-kyung

A VIP member of the Black Sun.

Geumsa Organization (eps. 15-16)

- Park Ho-san as Park Min-geon

The head of Geumsa Organization. Known as the Bishop, he has been planning his revenge against the Rainbow Taxi Company for years, particularly harbouring a disturbing decades-long obsession and jealousy towards Do-gi for currently unknown reasons and his desire to overthrow and kill him.

- Kim Chang-hwan as Lee Si-wan

A bank teller in charge of foreign exchange transactions and reported it to the prosecution. He was arrested on the false charge of attempted murder.

- Yoon Sang-ho as Bae Ki-seok

A corrupt warden of the Jangsa Prison and member of the Geumsa Organization.

==== Season 3 ====
Neko Money (eps. 1-2)

- Lee Yu-ji as Oh Ye-ji

Rainbow Taxi Company's first requester (in season 3). She introduced a gambling game to help her classmate Yi-seo earn money quickly for her grandmother's eye surgery.

- Cha Si-yeon as Yoon Yi-seo

Ye-ji's classmate who was forced to work as a prostitute in Japan, after accumulating heavy gambling debts from playing a gambling game Ye-ji introduced.

- Show Kasamatsu as Keita Matsuda

The head of Neko Money, and a rising force of the Japanese Yakuza. He also engages in prostitution and human trafficking.

- Naoto Takenaka as a former Yakuza
- Edan Lui as Michael Chang

An Interpol agent dispatched from Hong Kong.

Noblesse Motors (eps. 3-4)

- Kim Eun-seok as Oh Man-soo

Rainbow Taxi Company's second requester (in season 3). A former driver for Rainbow Taxi Company, he currently works as a designated driver. He was a victim of various schemes of Noblesse Motors.

- Yoon Shi-yoon as Cha Byeong-jin

The head of Noblesse Motors, and a disbarred lawyer. He used loopholes to exploit victims through the schemes Noblesse Motors had done.

- Son In-yong as Manager Yang

A sales manager of Noblesse Motors.

- Jeong Si-hun as Go Deok-su

A sales manager of Noblesse Motors.

- Ahn Si-eun as Assistant Manager Yoo

An assistant manager of Noblesse Motors.

- Lee Woo-sung as Son Min-soo

A victim of a scam scheme of Noblesse Motors.

- Lee Kyung-chae as Oh Ji-eun

Man-soo's daughter who is preparing for the civil service examination after graduating from university.

- Byun Yoon-jeong as Park Mi-jin

Man-soo's wife.

Jingwang University Volleyball Team (eps. 5-8)

- Kim Gi-cheon as Park Dong-su

Rainbow Taxi Company's first ever requester since its opening. In 2010, he was approached by Sung-chul to seek revenge for his son's murder, but disappeared afterwards with no news for 15 years. Present day, he has been suffering from dementia which was caused by a serious car accident.

- Lee Do-han as Park Min-ho

Dong-su's son who was a promising volleyball player, but was seemingly murdered in 2010, and his body was not found until present day.

- Eum Moon-suk as Cheon Gwang-jin

The head of a gambling and sports match-fixing operation, and a former Jingwang University Volleyball Team manager.

- Shin Ju-hwan as Jo Seong-uk

A former libero of Jingwang University volleyball team, and teammates of Min-ho and Dong-hyeon. Present day, he is the current manager of Jingwang University's volleyball team, though with no official coaching qualifications.

- Moon Soo-young as Im Dong-hyeon

Former Jingwang University volleyball team player and Min-ho's friend since high school. He was jailed for assault on Min-ho in 2010. Present day, he is the head of a gym, and habitually gambles.

- Choi Jae-sup as Attorney Ha

A lawyer working at The Crown Law Firm.

- Lee Myeong-ro as Jung Yeon-tae

Current Jingwang University volleyball team's starring libero, who is involved in the match-fixing scheme.

- Yang Hak-jin as Hwang Ji-hoon

Current Jingwang University volleyball team player.

Yellowstar Entertainment (eps. 9-10)

- Oh Ga-bin as Lee Ro-mi

Rainbow Taxi Company's third requester (in season 3). She was an idol trainee under Yellowstar Entertainment and was set to debut with the group Elements as its leader, but faced various threats such as sexual bribery and drugs from her company, therefore she ran away from the company.

- Jang Na-ra as Kang Ju-ri
  - Kang Na-eon as young Kang Ju-ri

The CEO of Yellowstar Entertainment. A former idol from a girl group herself, she retired due to an accident that led her to require amputation on her left leg, and installing a prosthetic one on her. She made her company's trainees provide sexual favors to various clients behind the scenes.

- Yoo Tae-joo as Jung Kyung-soo

The general manager of Yellowstar Entertainment.

- Choi Seung-joon as Manager Song

A department head of Yellowstar Entertainment.

- Yoon Ha-young as Song Ji-an

Ro-mi's good friend and an idol trainee under Yellowstar Entertainment, and a member of Elements.

- Cho Hye-won as Yeon-min

An idol trainee under Yellowstar Entertainment alongside Ro-mi, and a member of Elements.

- Lee Soo-jin as A-ra

An idol trainee under Yellowstar Entertainment alongside Ro-mi, and a member of Elements.

- Go Hae-won as Su-jeong

An idol trainee under Yellowstar Entertainment alongside Ro-mi, and the youngest member of Elements.

- Lee Sung-woo as Lee An-joon

The main PD of the SBC music show Music Stage. He worked alongside Ju-ri for her company's trainees' provision of sexual favors.

Second-hand Market Fraud Operation / Samheungdo Gang (eps. 11-14)

- Han Jung-hyun as Yoo Min-jung

Rainbow Taxi Company's fourth requester (in season 3). She was a victim of a fraud in Acorn Market when she was finding second-hand baby products while she was pregnant, and was thoroughly victimised from the fraud operation's retaliations after she tried to report on the fraud.

- Cha Joon-hee as Park Da-som

A younger sibling that Maria knows. She was also a victim of a fraud in Acorn Market.

- Park Shi-yoon as Kim Woo-jong

The head of a fraud operation which involves posting fake listings on various second-hand portals, and retaliation towards those who reported on the operation.

- Lee Hyo-je as Kim Jung-soo

A university student who works part-time for the fraud operation.

- Kim Hyun-kyu as Hong Shin-so

The head of Modu Detective Agency.

- Kim Sung-kyu as Go Sung-hyuk

A corrupt former prosecutor turned photographer.

- Lee Geung-young as Joo Seok-bong

A former pseudo-pastor turned abbot Seohwang of Samheungsa.

- Yoo Ji-wang as Choi Cheol-woong

A Special Forces mercenary turned killer for Samheungdo Gang.

- Lee Chae-won as Yeo Ye-rim

A former programmer for a gambling establishment, and current owner of Samheung Motel.

- Ji Dae-han as Kim Cheol-min

A corrupt police officer of Samheung Police Station.

- Jang Sung-won as Bong Wook

An investigative reporter who has been investigating the Samheungdo Gang for six months.

- Choi Min as Shin Kyung-soo

An investigative reporter who is a senior of Wook. He was killed while investigating the Samheungdo Gang alongside Wook.

- Park Sung-il as Lee Gi-hyun

The former mastermind behind Cambodia's Mango Complex voice phishing operation.

- Oh Gi-gwang as Gi-hyun's cellmate

2802th Special Missions Force (eps. 15-16)

- Kim Seo-ha as Park Jae-won

Rainbow Taxi Company's fifth requester (in season 3). He was directly trained by Do-gi during his time in the 707th Special Mission Group, and is currently serving in the military as a master sergeant under the 2802th Special Missions Force's Counter Terrorism First Team.

- Jeon So-nee as Yoo Seon-ah

A master sergeant who last served in the 2802th Special Missions Force's Counter Terrorism First Team. She was directly trained by Do-gi during her time in the 707th Special Mission Group. She was killed in an explosion, and was then posthumously discharged with demotion of three ranks for unauthorized leave, weapon theft, and attempt to contact North Korean officials.

- Kim Jong-soo as Oh Won-sang

Former lieutenant general and Commander of the Army Special Warfare Command.

- Kim Jin-wook as Kim Tae-hyun

A colonel, and the Commander of the 2802th Special Missions Force.

- Park Do-wook as Lee Hyung-in

A lieutenant of the 2802th Special Missions Force.

- Jeon Jin-ki as Jo Sang-hoon

A major general, and the current Commander of the Republic of Korea Army Special Warfare Command School. He helped the formerly discharged Do-gi return to the military.

=== Special appearances ===
Season 1

- Yoon Do-hyun as Driver Yoon (ep. 1)
- Lee Young-ae (voice appearance)
- Park Geun-hyung as Sung-mi's husband (ep. 13)
- Park Jin-hee as Do Joong-eun (ep. 16)

Jin-woo's replacement as deputy chief prosecutor of the Seoul Northern District Prosecutors' Office.

- Ryu Hyun-kyung as Baek Kyung-mi (ep. 16)

Sung-mi's younger sister.

- Yoon Sung-yeo (ep. 15)

A real-life suspect of the Hwaseong serial murders who was wrongfully convicted and sentenced to life imprisonment for one of the murders.

Season 2

- Lee Young-ae (voice appearance)
- Shim So-young as Lim Bok-ja (eps. 1-2)
- Namkoong Min as Chun Ji-hoon (ep. 9)
- Yoo Seung-mok as Cho Jin-woo (ep. 9)
- Cho Jung-sik and Joo Si-eun as Talk show hosts (ep. 10)
- Kim So-yeon as the first deluxe taxi driver (ep. 16)
- Moon Chae-won as Oh Mi-seo (ep. 16)

A lieutenant of the 29th Infantry Division.

- Writer Oh Sang-ho as a bartender (ep. 16)
- Son Jung-woo as a bartender (ep. 16)

Season 3

- Lee Young-ae (voice appearance)
- Jo In as Kang Maria (eps. 5, 11)
- Yoo Seung-mok as Cho Jin-woo (eps. 5-6)
- Hu In-jeong as Jingwang University volleyball team coach in 2010 (ep. 5)
- Kim Gwang-guk and Si Eun-mi as current Jingwang University volleyball team coaches (ep. 5)
- Im Won-hee as Kwak Moo-seok (ep. 6)
- Jung Hyuk and Shin Yu-eun as hosts of Music Stage (ep. 10)
- Shim So-young as Lim Bok-soon (ep. 16)

Lim Bok-ja's younger sister.

- Jung Ji-an as Ma Sang-hee (ep. 16)

Bok-soon's secretary.

- Ryu Yi-jae as Ahn Jung-eun (ep. 16)

Go-eun's older sister who has passed away.

== Series overview ==
Season	Episodes		Originally released		Time slot	Avg. viewership (millions)
Season	Episodes		First released	Last released	Time slot	Avg. viewership (millions)
1	16		April 9, 2021	May 29, 2021	Friday and Saturday at 22:00 (KST)	2.765
2	18	Special 1	February 16, 2023		Thursday at 22:00 (KST)	0.721
2	18	16	February 17, 2023	April 15, 2023	Friday and Saturday at 22:00 (KST)	2.869
2	18	Special 2	March 4, 2023		Friday at 22:00 (KST)	1.030
3	16		November 21, 2025	January 10, 2026	Friday and Saturday at 22:00 (KST)	2.316

== Production ==
=== Season 1 ===
Development

On December 4, 2019, SBS was considering adapting the webtoon The Deluxe Taxi by Carlos and Lee Jae-jin into a television series. Korean streaming platform Wavve was also invested to the series, and has been previously invested in several other series such as Zombie Detective (2020), Bossam: Steal the Fate (2021), and Alice (2020).

Casting

On November 20, 2020, Lee Je-hoon, Esom, Kim Eui-sung and Lee Na-eun were confirmed to star in the series.

On March 8, 2021, Lee Na-eun was removed from the cast following bullying accusations against her. Two days later, she was replaced by Pyo Ye-jin.

Filming

About sixty percent of the filming for the first season was complete as of March 8, 2021. Lee Na-eun's scenes were removed and had to re-shot.

=== Season 2 ===
Development

On July 6, 2021, SBS announced the production of the second season of the series.

Casting

Esom had to withdraw from the cast due to scheduling inconsistencies. Lee Je-hoon and Pyo Ye-jin were confirmed to reprise their respective roles. Script reading took place on June 12, 2022. A day later, Kim Eui-sung, Jang Hyuk-jin and Bae Yoo-ram were confirmed to reprise their roles.

Filming

On July 15, 2022, SBS reported that some of their staff tested positive for COVID-19, causing the filming in Vietnam to be temporarily halted. The Vietnam Kidnap case episodes (1-2) features scenes shot in Da Nang, Ho Chi Minh City, Huế, and Ha Long Bay.

=== Season 3 ===
Development

On April 16, 2023, SBS confirmed that a third season of the series was in the works.

Casting

Lee Je-hoon, Pyo Ye-jin and Kim Eui-sung will reprise again their roles. Bae Yoo-ram is also confirmed to appear in the third season. Additionally, Edan Lui of Hong Kong boy group Mirror are also starring on the series as part of co-production with Viu.

Filming

The first few episodes are filmed in Saga and Fukuoka prefectures of Japan.

== Release ==
The first teaser video and teaser poster were released on December 31, 2020.

To promote the second season of the series, Viu invited Lee Je-hoon to his first fan-meeting in the Philippines on March 3, 2023, in Indonesia on March 19, 2023, and in Singapore on March 25, 2023. Lee also participated at the FilMart in Hong Kong, where Viu reported that the second season of the series was the most-watched program following the premiere.

== Original soundtrack ==
=== Season 1 ===
Taxi Driver OST

Soundtrack album by Various artists
- Released: 2021
- Genre: Soundtrack
- Languages: Korean; English
- Labels: Kakao Entertainment; SBS Contents Hub; Music Recipe

Part 1

Released on April 16, 2021
No.	Title	Lyrics	Music	Artist	Length
1.	"Silence"	Yoon Do-hyun	Yoon Do-hyun	YB	3:25
2.	"Silence" (inst.)		Yoon Do-hyun		3:25
Total length:					6:50

Part 2

Released on April 23, 2021
No.	Title	Lyrics	Music	Artist	Length
1.	"A Gloomy Letter" (우울한 편지)	Yoo Jae-ha	Yoo Jae-ha	Kwak Jin-eon	3:40
2.	"A Gloomy Letter" ((Classical Ver.))	Yoo Jae-ha	Yoo Jae-ha	Kwak Jin-eon	3:40
3.	"A Gloomy Letter" (inst.)		Yoo Jae-ha		3:40
Total length:					11:00

Part 3

Released on April 30, 2021
No.	Title	Lyrics	Music	Artist	Length
1.	"A Walk" (산책)	Sorri	Lee Han-chul	Pyo Ye-jin	3:48
2.	"A Walk" (inst.)		Lee Han-chul		3:48
Total length:					7:36

Part 4

Released on May 4, 2021
No.	Title	Lyrics	Music	Artist	Length
1.	"All Day"	Jeon Chang-yeob	Advanced; RYS	Cha Ji-yeon	3:38
2.	"All Day" (inst.)		Advanced; RYS		3:38
Total length:					7:16

Part 5

Released on May 15, 2021
No.	Title	Lyrics	Music	Artist	Length
1.	"Run Away"	Simon Dominic	noisemasterminsu; Hyeon; Sean; Tez_Toy; Simon Dominic	Simon Dominic	3:16
2.	"Run Away" (inst.)		noisemasterminsu; Hyeon; Sean; Tez_Toy; Simon Dominic		3:16
Total length:					6:32

Part 6

Released on May 22, 2021
No.	Title	Lyrics	Music	Artist	Length
1.	"Moon Light" (달빛)	Choi Han-sol	Choi Han-sol; Choi Young-hoon	Sanha	3:30
2.	"Moon Light" (inst.)		Choi Han-sol; Choi Young-hoon		3:30
Total length:					7:00

Part 7

Released on May 29, 2021
No.	Title	Lyrics	Music	Artist	Length
1.	"Way Home" (귀로)	Lee Joo-yeob	Son Sung-jae	Yoon Do-hyun	4:25
2.	"Way Home" (inst.)		Son Sung-jae		4:25
Total length:					8:50

=== Season 2 ===
Taxi Driver 2 OST

Soundtrack album by Various artists
- Released: 2023
- Genre: Soundtrack
- Languages: Korean; English
- Labels: Kakao Entertainment; SBS Contents Hub

Part 1

Released on February 18, 2023
No.	Title	Lyrics	Music	Artist	Length
1.	"Fighter"	Hana	Tom and Jerry; Safira.K	Ha Hyun-woo (Guckkasten)	3:15
2.	"Fighter" (inst.)		Tom and Jerry; Safira.K		3:15
Total length:					6:30

Part 2

Released on February 25, 2023
No.	Title	Lyrics	Music	Artist	Length
1.	"Haven" (휴게소)	Zeenan; Onetop	Zeenan; Onetop	Car, the Garden	3:24
2.	"Haven" (inst.)		Zeenan; Onetop		3:24
Total length:					6:48

Part 3

Released on March 4, 2023
No.	Title	Lyrics	Music	Artist	Length
1.	"Born This Way"	Zeenan; Onetop	Zeenan; Onetop	Zeenan	3:40
2.	"Born This Way" (inst.)		Zeenan; Onetop		3:40
Total length:					7:20

Part 4

Released on March 10, 2023
No.	Title	Lyrics	Music	Artist	Length
1.	"Wonderful Night" (아름다운 밤)	Park Sung-yong	Park Sung-yong; Im Gwang-gyun	N.Flying	3:34
2.	"Wonderful Night" (inst.)		Park Sung-yong; Im Gwang-gyun		3:34
Total length:					7:08

Part 5

Released on March 18, 2023
No.	Title	Lyrics	Music	Artist	Length
1.	"All My Heart" (진심)	Yeonso; NEZ; Gowoon	Yeonso; NEZ; Gowoon	Kang A-sol	3:33
2.	"All My Heart" (inst.)		Yeonso; NEZ; Gowoon		3:30
Total length:					7:03

Part 6

Released on March 25, 2023
No.	Title	Lyrics	Music	Artist	Length
1.	"Face to Face"	Zeenan; Lee Jung-won; Clef Crew	Zeenan; Lee Jung-won; Clef Crew	Kang Seung-yoon (Winner)	3:02
2.	"Face to Face" (inst.)		Zeenan; Lee Jung-won; Clef Crew		3:02
Total length:					6:04

== Viewership ==
Taxi Driver : South Korea viewers per episode (millions)

Season	Episode number																Average
Season	1	2	3	4	5	6	7	8	9	10	11	12	13	14	15	16	Average
1	1.926	2.607	2.452	3.117	2.636	3.065	2.847	2.824	2.635	3.072	2.742	3.017	2.762	2.923	2.746	2.871	2.765
2	2.370	2.155	2.448	2.364	2.840	2.912	2.355	3.072	2.537	3.337	2.664	3.387	3.098	3.496	2.870	4.005	2.869
3	1.787	1.903	1.745	2.454	1.784	2.402	2.103	2.560	2.058	2.434	2.354	2.895	2.558	2.894	2.337	2.790	2.316

Source: Audience measurement performed nationwide by Nielsen Korea.

=== Season 1 ===
Average TV viewership ratings (season 1)
Ep.	Part	Original broadcast date	Average audience share		
Ep.	Part	Original broadcast date	Nielsen Korea		TNmS
Ep.	Part	Original broadcast date	Nationwide	Seoul	Nationwide
1	1	April 9, 2021	8.7% (7th)	9.4% (5th)	7.3% (10th)
1	2	April 9, 2021	10.7% (3rd)	11.2% (3rd)	8.7% (7th)
2	1	April 10, 2021	7.3% (9th)	8.5% (5th)	5.7% (20th)
2	2	April 10, 2021	13.5% (3rd)	15.0% (3rd)	11.4% (3rd)
3	1	April 16, 2021	9.8% (5th)	10.3% (4th)	10.0% (5th)
3	2	April 16, 2021	13.6% (3rd)	14.5% (2nd)	12.7% (1st)
4	1	April 17, 2021	11.5% (4th)	11.8% (4th)	11.4% (3rd)
4	2	April 17, 2021	15.6% (1st)	16.3% (1st)	14.6% (1st)
5	1	April 23, 2021	12.3% (4th)	13.3% (4th)	11.2% (4th)
5	2	April 23, 2021	14.2% (3rd)	15.6% (1st)	12.8% (3rd)
6	1	April 24, 2021	8.7% (5th)	9.2% (5th)	9.0% (5th)
6	2	April 24, 2021	16.0% (3rd)	16.8% (3rd)	15.2% (3rd)
7	1	April 30, 2021	12.9% (4th)	14.3% (2nd)	11.3% (4th)
7	2	April 30, 2021	15.1% (2nd)	16.3% (1st)	13.4% (3rd)
8	1	May 1, 2021	8.3% (5th)	9.0% (5th)	8.6% (5th)
8	2	May 1, 2021	15.2% (3rd)	15.9% (3rd)	14.4% (3rd)
9	1	May 7, 2021	12.0% (4th)	12.9% (4th)	12.1% (4th)
9	2	May 7, 2021	14.7% (3rd)	16.0% (1st)	14.5% (2nd)
10	1	May 8, 2021	10.1% (4th)	11.2% (5th)	10 4% (4th)
10	2	May 8, 2021	15.4% (3rd)	17.0% (3rd)	14.9% (3rd)
11	1	May 14, 2021	12.4% (4th)	13.9% (4th)	11.0% (5th)
11	2	May 14, 2021	14.6% (3rd)	16.3% (1st)	12.1% (3rd)
12	1	May 15, 2021	10.7% (5th)	11.6% (5th)	N/A
12	2	May 15, 2021	15.3% (3rd)	16.1% (3rd)	N/A
13	1	May 21, 2021	12.2% (4th)	12.9% (4th)	12.4% (4th)
13	2	May 21, 2021	14.4% (3rd)	15.6% (1st)	13.9% (3rd)
14	1	May 22, 2021	10.2% (4th)	10.7% (5th)	10.3% (5th)
14	2	May 22, 2021	15.5% (3rd)	16.1% (3rd)	14.6% (3rd)
15	1	May 28, 2021	13.2% (4th)	13.8% (3rd)	12.6% (4th)
15	2	May 28, 2021	14.4% (3rd)	15.2% (1st)	14.1% (3rd)
16	1	May 29, 2021	10.9% (5th)	11.9% (4th)	11.0% (4th)
16	2	May 29, 2021	15.3% (3rd)	16.6% (3rd)	14.6% (3rd)
Average			12.6%	13.6%	11.9% (Note: This average rating is calculated based on the published ratings. The exact average rating is unknown due to multiple ratings not being published.)
The blue numbers represent the lowest ratings and the red numbers represent the highest ratings.; N/A denotes ratings that were not published.

=== Season 2 ===
Average TV viewership ratings (season 2)
Ep.	Original broadcast date	Average audience share		
Ep.	Original broadcast date	Nielsen Korea		TNmS
Ep.	Original broadcast date	Nationwide	Seoul	Nationwide
1	February 17, 2023	12.1% (3rd)	12.8% (2nd)	10.4% (3rd)
2	February 18, 2023	10.3% (2nd)	10.9% (2nd)	N/A
3	February 24, 2023	13.2% (3rd)	14.2% (1st)	10.5% (3rd)
4	February 25, 2023	11.3% (2nd)	11.7% (2nd)	10.7% (2nd)
5	March 3, 2023	14.7% (1st)	16.3% (1st)	N/A
6	March 11, 2023	14.4% (2nd)	15.5% (2nd)	12.4% (2nd)
7	March 17, 2023	13.0% (2nd)	13.7% (2nd)	11.8% (2nd)
8	March 18, 2023	16.0% (2nd)	17.0% (2nd)	N/A
9	March 24, 2023	13.4% (2nd)	14.1% (2nd)	11.6% (2nd)
10	March 25, 2023	17.7% (1st)	18.1% (1st)	11.8% (2nd)
11	March 31, 2023	14.5% (1st)	15.5% (1st)	11.4% (2nd)
12	April 1, 2023	18.3% (1st)	19.4% (1st)	13.8% (1st)
13	April 7, 2023	16.1% (1st)	17.4% (1st)	13.0% (1st)
14	April 8, 2023	18.3% (1st)	19.4% (1st)	16.7% (1st)
15	April 14, 2023	15.7% (1st)	16.0% (1st)	11.9% (2nd)
16	April 15, 2023	21.0% (1st)	21.8% (1st)	N/A
Average		15.0%	15.9%	12.2%
Special
1	February 16, 2023	3.6% (16th)	4.4% (12th)	3.2% (18th)
2	April 21, 2023	5.2% (8th)	5.8% (6th)	5.2% (11th)
Highlight
1	March 4, 2023	3.6% (15th)	3.6% (15th)	4.8% (10th)
The blue numbers represent the lowest ratings and the red numbers represent the highest ratings.; N/A denotes ratings that were not published.

=== Season 3 ===
Average TV viewership ratings (season 3)
Ep.	Original broadcast date	Average audience share (Nielsen Korea)	
Ep.	Original broadcast date	Nationwide	Seoul
1	November 21, 2025	9.5% (1st)	9.9% (1st)
2	November 22, 2025	9.0% (2nd)	9.5% (2nd)
3	November 28, 2025	8.6% (2nd)	9.0% (1st)
4	November 29, 2025	11.6% (2nd)	12.6% (2nd)
5	December 5, 2025	8.9% (3rd)	9.4% (1st)
6	December 6, 2025	12.0% (2nd)	12.4% (2nd)
7	December 12, 2025	10.3% (1st)	10.3% (1st)
8	December 13, 2025	12.3% (2nd)	12.9% (2nd)
9	December 19, 2025	10.0% (1st)	11.2% (1st)
10	December 20, 2025	11.9% (2nd)	12.5% (2nd)
11	December 26, 2025	12.0% (1st)	12.2% (1st)
12	December 27, 2025	14.0% (2nd)	15.2% (2nd)
13	January 2, 2026	12.8% (1st)	13.5% (1st)
14	January 3, 2026	14.2% (2nd)	15.1% (2nd)
15	January 9, 2026	11.4% (1st)	11.4% (1st)
16	January 10, 2026	13.3% (2nd)	13.7% (2nd)
Average		11.4%	11.9%
The blue numbers represent the lowest ratings and the red numbers represent the highest ratings.

== Awards and nominations ==
Name of the award ceremony, year presented, category, nominee of the award, and the result of the nomination
Award ceremony	Year	Category	Nominee / Work	Result	Ref.
APAN Star Awards	2022	Top Excellence Award, Actor in a Miniseries	Lee Je-hoon	Nominated	
APAN Star Awards	2022	Best Supporting Actress	Cha Ji-yeon	Nominated	
Korea PD Awards	2022	Best TV Drama	Taxi Driver	Nominated	
SBS Drama Awards	2021	Grand Prize (Daesang)	Lee Je-hoon	Nominated	
SBS Drama Awards	2021	Top Excellence Award, Actor in a Miniseries Genre/Fantasy Drama	Lee Je-hoon	Won	
SBS Drama Awards	2021	Excellence Award, Actress in a Miniseries Genre/Fantasy Drama	Esom	Won	
SBS Drama Awards	2021	Excellence Award, Actress in a Miniseries Genre/Fantasy Drama	Pyo Ye-jin	Nominated	
SBS Drama Awards	2021	Best Supporting Actor in a Miniseries Genre/Fantasy Drama	Kim Eui-sung	Won	
SBS Drama Awards	2021	Best Supporting Actress in a Miniseries Genre/Fantasy Drama	Cha Ji-yeon	Won	
SBS Drama Awards	2021	Scene Stealer Award	Shim So-young	Won	
SBS Drama Awards	2021	Best New Actor	Choi Hyun-wook	Won	
SBS Drama Awards	2021	Best Supporting Team	Taxi Driver	Nominated	
SBS Drama Awards	2023	Grand Prize (Daesang)	Lee Je-hoon	Won	
SBS Drama Awards	2023	Excellence Award, Actor in a Seasonal Drama	Shin Jae-ha	Won	
SBS Drama Awards	2023	Excellence Award, Actress in a Seasonal Drama	Pyo Ye-jin	Won	
SBS Drama Awards	2023	Best Supporting Actor in a Seasonal Drama	Jang Hyuk-jin	Won	
SBS Drama Awards	2023	Best Supporting Actor in a Seasonal Drama	Bae Yoo-ram	Won	
SBS Drama Awards	2023	Netizen Choice's SBS Best Drama	Taxi Driver 2	Won	
SBS Drama Awards	2023	Best Young Actress	Ahn Chae-heum	Won	
SBS Drama Awards	2023	Scene Stealer Award	Go Sang-ho	Won	
SBS Drama Awards	2023	Scene Stealer Award	Byun Jung-hee	Won	
SBS Drama Awards	2025	Grand Prize (Daesang)	Lee Je-hoon	Won	
SBS Drama Awards	2025	Drama of the Year	Taxi Driver	Won	
SBS Drama Awards	2025	Excellence Award, Actor in a Miniseries Genre/Action Drama	Kim Eui-sung	Nominated	
SBS Drama Awards	2025	Excellence Award, Actress in a Miniseries Genre/Action Drama	Pyo Ye-jin	Won	
SBS Drama Awards	2025	Best Supporting Actor in a Miniseries Genre/Action Drama	Jang Hyuk-jin	Nominated	
SBS Drama Awards	2025	Best Supporting Actor in a Miniseries Genre/Action Drama	Bae Yoo-ram	Nominated	
SBS Drama Awards	2025	Best Performance	Kim Eui-sung	Won	
SBS Drama Awards	2025	Scene Stealer Award	Yoon Shi-yoon	Won	
Seoul International Drama Awards	2021	Outstanding Hallyu Drama Award	Taxi Driver	Won	
Seoul International Drama Awards	2021	Outstanding Korean Actor	Lee Je-hoon	Nominated	
