= Princess Aurora (film) =

- Theatrical poster
- Hangul: 오로라공주
- Hanja: 오로라公主
- RR: Orora gongju
- MR: Orora kongju
- Directed by: Bang Eun-jin
- Written by: Bang Eun-jin; Seo Min-hee; Kim Chang-rae; Jung Yong-joo
- Produced by: Myung Gye-nam; Nam Jong-woo; Kang Woo-suk
- Starring: Uhm Jung-hwa; Moon Sung-keun
- Cinematography: Choi Young-hwan
- Edited by: Kim Hyeon
- Music by: Jung Jae-hyung
- Distributed by: Cinema Service
- Release date: October 27, 2005
- Running time: 106 minutes
- Country: South Korea
- Language: Korean
- Box office: US$5,081,114

Princess Aurora (Korean: 오로라공주) is a 2005 South Korean crime thriller film starring Uhm Jung-hwa and Moon Sung-keun. This film about a mother over grieving the death of her child, who goes on a murderous revenge spree. It was the directorial and writing debut of actress-director Bang Eun-jin.

== Plot ==
A strange series of murders begin to take place in Korea. There seems to be no connection between the victims, only a small sticker depicting a character from the popular "Princess Aurora" cartoon series is found at every crime scene.

Detective Oh Sung-ho (Moon Sung-keun), who is studying to become a priest, and his partner (Kwon Oh-joong) are working on the serial murder case, with little progress. Sung-ho begins to suspect that his ex-wife Jung Soon-jung (Uhm Jung-hwa) might be behind the murders. Uncertain of his suspicions, Sung-ho withholds information, and instead of confirming Soon-jung's guilt or innocence, gets caught up emotionally and spends a romantic night with her. The killings continue, with Soon-jung out to punish everyone whom she believes played a role in her young child's death. Soon-jung eventually allows herself to be captured, in order to complete the final act of her revenge.

After killing her final target, she chooses to end her life to be with her daughter. The remaining target is then pursued and killed by her husband.

== Cast ==
- Uhm Jung-hwa - Jung Soon-jung
- Moon Sung-keun - Oh Sung-ho
- Kwon Oh-joong - Detective Jung
- Choi Jong-won - chief of detective squad
- Hyun Young - Choi Shin-ok
- Kim Yong-gun - Na Jae-keun
- Kim Ik-tae - Park Dal-soo, taxi driver
- Park Hyo-jun - Jang Myung-gil
- Jang Hyun-sung - Kim Woo-tae
- Park Seong-bin - Hong Ki-bum
- Lee Ji-soo
- Choi Ye-jin
- Lee Dae-yeon - chief detective
- Park Kwang-jung - coroner
- Jung Eun-pyo
- Kim Yeon-jae
- Yoo Hye-jung
- Jung Man-sik - Detective Choi
- Kim Seon-hwa - Jang Myung-gil's mother
- Park Byung-eun - Porsche customer 2
- Park Hyuk-kwon - squad captain
- Lee Jung-yong - Detective Baek
- Lee Seol-hee - department store parking attendant
- Jung Sung-hwa

== Reception ==
Though it was released with far less fanfare, its violent theme earned it comparison to Sympathy for Lady Vengeance, released the same year.

== Awards and nominations ==
2005 Korean Association of Film Critics Awards

- Best New Director - Bang Eun-jin

2005 Women in Film Korea Awards

- Woman Filmmaker of the Year - Bang Eun-jin

2006 Baeksang Arts Awards

- Nomination - Best Actress - Uhm Jung-hwa
- Nomination - Best New Director - Bang Eun-jin

2006 Golden Cinematography Awards

- Best New Director - Bang Eun-jin

2006 Busan Film Critics Awards

- Best Actress - Uhm Jung-hwa

2006 Korean Film Awards

- Nomination - Best New Director - Bang Eun-jin
