= Bae Yoo-ram =

South Korean actor

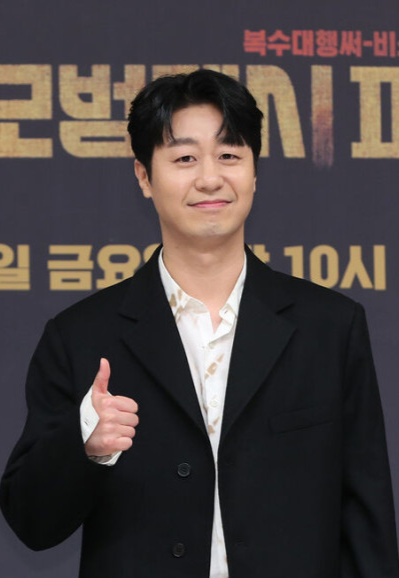
- Bae in February 2023
- Born: August 22, 1986 (age 40); Daegu, North Gyeongsang Province, South Korea
- Education: Konkuk University – Department of Film
- Occupation: Actor
- Years active: 2009–present
- Agent: Story J Company

Korean name
- Hangul: 배유람
- RR: Bae Yuram
- MR: Pae Yuram

Bae Yoo-ram (Korean: 배유람; born August 22, 1986), is a South Korean actor.

== Filmography ==
=== Film ===
Key
†	Denotes films that have not yet been released

Year	Title	Role	Ref.
2011	The Day He Arrives	student 2	
2013	Nobody's Daughter Haewon	student 2	
2014	A Hard Day	conscripted policeman	
2014	18 - Eighteen Noir	Dae-hyun	
2014	Fashion King	Woo Ki-myung's male classmate	
2014	The King of Jokgu	Secretary Tae Hyung-wook	
2014	Tazza: The Hidden Card	Neobchi	
2014	My Dictator	play assistant director	
2014	The Wicked	Jin-woo	
2015	Casa Amor: Exclusive for Ladies		
2015	Socialphobia	Jung-bae	
2015	Coin Locker Girl	local police 1	
2015	The Advocate: A Missing Body	Yong-sik	
2016	No Tomorrow		
2016	Familyhood		
2016	Tunnel		
2017	Midnight Runners	Jae-ho	
2018	Be with You	young Hong-goo	
2019	Hit-and-Run Squad	Detective Park	
2019	Miss & Mrs. Cops		
2019	Let Us Meet Now	Sung-min	
2019	Beautiful Voice	Team Leader Kang	
2019	Exit	Yong-min	
2019	Tazza: One Eyed Jack	Public Official Moon	
2020	Lucky Chan-sil	Kim Young	
2021	Pipeline	Man-sik	
2021	Recalled	Detective Bae	
2021	Nothing Serious	Woo-sung	
2023	Killing Romance	Young-chan	
2023	Mount CHIAK	Hyunji's father	

=== Television series ===
Key
†	Denotes television productions that have not yet been released

Year	Title	Role	Notes	Ref.
2014	Misaeng: Incomplete Life	young Oh Sang-sik	Cameo (ep. 11)	
2015	The Producers	Ryu Il-yong		
2015	Oh My Ghost	PD	Cameo (ep. 7)	
2015	Cheo Yong 2	Seok-chan	Cameo (eps. 9–10)	
2015–2016	Reply 1988	Assistant Manager Yoo		
2016	Madame Antoine: The Love Therapist	Lee Jin-soo		
2016	Goodbye Mr. Black	An Gye-dong		
2016	Wanted	Kwon Kyung-hoon		
2017	The Emperor: Owner of the Mask	Park Moo-ha		
2017–2018	Untouchable	Choi Jae-ho		
2017–2018	Judge vs. Judge	Kim Joo-hyeong		
2018–2019	Less Than Evil	Ban Ji-deuk		
2017	Hakuna Matata Pole Pole			
2020	Zombie Detective	Station PD		
2020–2021	Run On	Han Seok-won	Cameo (eps. 1 and 16)	
2021	D.P.	Kim Gyu	Cameo (eps. 3 and 5)	
2021	Would You Like a Cup of Coffee?	Suk-pil	Cameo (ep. 11)	
2021–present	Taxi Driver	Park Jin-eon	Seasons 1–3	
2021–2022	Moonshine	Kang Hae-soo		
2022	The King of Pigs	Park Chan-young		
2022	Unicorn	Jessi		
2022	Yonder	Hacker Park		
2023	Black Knight	5-7		
2025	Tastefully Yours	Lee Yu-jin		
2026–2027	Nine to Six †	Kim Dong-suk		

== Awards and nominations ==
Year presented, name of the award ceremony, category, nominated work, and the result of the nomination
Year	Award	Category	Nominated work	Result	Ref.
2023	Scene Stealer Festival	Bonsang "Main Prize"	Taxi Driver	Won	
2023	SBS Drama Awards	Best Supporting Actor in a Miniseries Genre/Fantasy Drama	Taxi Driver 2	Won	
