= Shim So-young =

South Korean actress (born 1970)

- Born: November 22, 1970 (age 55); Seoul, South Korea
- Other name: Sim So-yeong
- Education: Korea University
- Occupation: Actress
- Years active: 1995–present
- Agent: Starweave Entertainment
- Known for: Pandora: Beneath the Paradise; Behind Every Star; Green Mothers' Club

Shim So-young (hangul: 심소영) is a South Korean actress. She is known for her roles in dramas such as Alchemy of Souls, Green Mothers' Club, Behind Every Star, Taxi Driver and Pandora: Beneath the Paradise. She also appeared in films including Illang: The Wolf Brigade, The Battle: Roar to Victory, Dark Figure of Crime and The Day I Died: Unclosed Case.

== Filmography ==
=== Television series ===
Year	Title	Role	Ref.
2018	Children of a Lesser God	Jamido resident	
2018	The Guest	Possessed sushi place owner	
2019	Possessed	So-young	
2019	Joseon Survival Period	Lady Park	
2020	Hyena	Park Hae-suk	
2020	Goedam	Shaman	
2020	Tale of the Nine Tailed	Spirit of Darkness	
2021–23	Taxi Driver	Lim Bok-ja	
2021	Summer Drama Collage: "Monster Mansion"	Pharmacist	
2022	Green Mothers' Club	Housekeeper Nam	
2022	Alchemy of Souls	Shaman Choi	
2022	Behind Every Star	Shim Myeong-ae	
2023	Pandora: Beneath the Paradise	Kim Seon-deok	
2023	Duty After School	Kook Young-soo's mother	
2023	Korea–Khitan War	Court Lady Choi	
2024	Crash	Shin Gyeong-ja	
2024	Good Partner	Kim Eun-hee	

=== Film ===
Year	Title	Role	Ref.
2018	Psychokinesis	Evicted resident	
2018	Illang: The Wolf Brigade	Sect Team 1 member	
2018	Dark Figure of Crime	Auntie	
2018	Unstoppable	Auntie	
2019	The Battle: Roar to Victory	Chinese Shaman	
2020	Beasts Clawing at Straws	Flower shop owner	
2020	The Day I Died: Unclosed Case	Cheol-yi's mother	
2021	Pipeline	Bong-soo's mother	
2021	The Grotesque Mansion	Pharmacist's mother	
2021	The Cursed: Dead Man's Prey	Cleaner	
2021	On the Line	Chinese iron factory accounting clerk	
2021	Miracle: Letters to the President	Villager	
2022	Hidden	Mathematics professor	
2022	Take Care of My Mom	Dong-sook	
2023	Usury Academy	Chief Kang	
2023	Smugglers	Diver	
2024	Jung Family's Farm	TBA	

== Awards and nominations ==
Name of the award ceremony, year presented, category, nominee of the award, and the result of the nomination
Award ceremony	Year	Category	Nominee / Work	Result	Ref.
1st Korea Theater Festival Awards	2016	Best New Actress	Flower Gods	Won	
16th Gomanaru National Local Theater Festival Awards	2019	Best Actress	Theatre Drama	Won	
SBS Drama Awards	2021	Scene Stealer Award	Taxi Driver	Won	
