= Kang Dae-ha =

South Korean filmmaker (1942–1995)

- Hangul: 강대하
- Hanja: 姜大河
- RR: Gang Daeha
- MR: Kang Taeha

Art name
- Hangul: 우성
- Hanja: 羽聲
- RR: Useong
- MR: Usŏng

Kang Dae-ha (Korean: 강대하; April 12, 1942 – 1995) was a South Korean screenwriter, producer, film and art director and poet.

== Biography ==
Kang Dae-ha was born in Seogwipo, Jeju Island, Korea in 1942, and majored in creative writing at Seorabeol Arts University. He initially considered becoming a painter, but after graduating high school he turned to literature, writing poetry for coterie magazine The Cliff (Jeolbyeok). His poem, The Paean (Changa), was recommended in the December 1965 issue of the monthly literary magazine Contemporary Literature (Hyundae Munhak). Before going on to get a third recommendation—the last step to becoming a professional poet—he instead entered the film industry, gaining recognition for his 1970 screenplay, Somebody's' House (Tain-ui jip). Throughout his career he wrote more than fifty screenplays, including A Girl's First Love (Sonyeo-ui cheot-sarang, 1971), and Green Fallen-Leaves (Paran nagyeop, 1976).

In 1976, Kang debuted as a film director with the action film Immoral Man (Baedeokja), based on his own screenplay, which was produced by Gukje Film Promotion (국제영화흥업) and starred Lee Nak-hoon and Yeo Su-jin (여수진). Although the film depicts kidnapping, murder, and illicit drug dealing, the themes of Kang's subsequent works related more to Korean culture and religion. His second film as director, Three Generations of Widows (Gwabu 3dae, 1983), was also based on his own screenplay, and was set in a town of haenyeo (female divers) on Jeju Island in post war Korea.

Kang's later works include The Fire Arrow (불화살 1989), which dealt with Confucian tradition in ancient Korean society regarding women's faithfulness to their husbands, and Mayago (마야고 1989), which was based around Korean shamanism.

Kang died of liver cancer in Seoul in 1995.

== Filmography ==
=== As director ===
- Immoral Man (배덕자 - Baedeokja, 1976)
- Three Generations of Widows (과부 3대 - Gwabu 3dae, 1983)
- Discord (불화살 - Bulhwasal, 1989)
- Mayago (마야고, 1990)
- The Firebird's Dance (불새의 춤 - Bulsae-ui chum, 1991)

=== As screenwriter ===
- Snowstorm (눈보라 - Nunbora, 1968)
- Endless Love (아무리 사랑해도 - Amuri Saranghaedo, 1969)
- Woman's Theater (여인극장 - Yeo-in geukjang, 1970)
- Someone's House (타인의 집 - Tain-ui jip, 1970)
- A girl's first love (소녀의 첫사랑 - Sonyeo-ui cheotsarang, 1971)
- The Crying Bird in Cheongsan (청산에 우는 새야 - Cheongsan-e uneun sae-ya, 1971)
- Dark Glasses (검은 안경 - Geom-eun angyeong, 1971)
- It Can't be Tears (아마도 빗물이겠지 - Amado bismul-igessji, 1971)
- The Partner (동업자 - Dong-eobja, 1972)
- A Wrecked Fishing Boat (난파선 - Nanpaseon, 1973)
- Bibari (비바리, 1973)
- Order of Assassination (암살지령 - Amsaljilyeong, 1974)
- In a Lonely Mountain Villa (외로운 산장에서 - Oelo-un sanjang-eseo, 1974)
- Where There is Love (사랑이 있는 곳에 - Salang-i issneun gos-e, 1974)
- The 49th Day After Death (49제 - 49je, 1975)
- Green Fallen-Leaves (파란 낙엽 - Palan nag-yeob, 1976)
- I Am Really Sorry. (진짜 진짜 미안해 - Jinjja jinjja mi-anhae, 1976)
- I Like You. (네가 좋아 - Nega joh-a, 1976)
- Immoral Man (배덕자 - Bae Deokja, 1976)
- Tell I ? (말해버릴까 - Malhaebeolilkka, 1976)
- Girl on Fire (불타는 소녀 - Bultaneun sonyeo, 1977)
- The High-level Fighter of High School (고교 유단자 - Gogyo yudanja, 1977)
- Special Investigator Bat (특별수사반 박쥐 - Teugbyeolsusaban bagjwi, 1977)
- Four Iron Men (사대철인 - Sadaecheol-in, 1977)
- The Best Player of High School (고교 고단자 - Gogyo godanja, 1978)
- So Close Yet Far (가깝고도 먼 길 - Gakkabgodo meon gil, 1978)
- Experience (체험 - Cheheom, 1978)
- Other's Room (타인의 방 - Ta-in-ui bang, 1979)
- The Rain at Night (밤이면 내리는 비 - Bam-imyeon naelineun bi, 1979)
- When Love Blossoms (사랑이 깊어질 때 - Salang-i gip-eojil ttae, 1979)
- Woman on Vacation (휴가받은 여자 - Hyugabad-eun yeoja, 1980)
- Painful Maturity (아픈 성숙 - Apeun sengsuk, 1980)
- Helpless Chun-Ja (춘자는 못말려 - Chunjaneun mosmallyeo, 1980)
- Colorful Woman (색깔있는 여자 - Saegkkal-issneun yeoja, 1980)
- The Tree Blooming with Love (사랑이 꽃피는 나무 - Salang-e kkochpineun namu, 1981)
- Is There a Girl Like Her? (이런 여자 없나요 - Ileon yeoja eobsna-yo, 1981)
- A Night's Heaven (밤의 천국 - Bam-ui cheongug, 1982)
- Fiery Wind (불바람 - Bulbaram, 1982)
- The Sunflower That Waits For Night (밤을 기다리는 해바라기 - Bameulgidarineun haebaragi, 1982)
- Theater of Life (인생극장 - Insaenggeukjang, 1983)
- Three Generations of Widows (과부 3대 - Gwabu 3dae, 1983)
- Jealousy (질투 - Jiltu, 1983; won "Best Supporting Actress" at the Asia-Pacific Film Festival
- Like A Flower Petal Or A Leaf (꽃잎이어라 낙엽이어라 - Kkoch-ip-i-eo-ra nakyeob-i-eo-ra, 1983)
- The Miss and the Cadet (아가씨와 사관 - Agassi-wa sagwan, 1984)
- Light of Maehwabang (매화방 천등불 - Maehwabang Cheondeungbul, 1989)
- Discord (불화살 - Bulhwasal, 1989)
- A Turkey (칠색조 - Chilsaekjo, 1989)
- Mayago (마야고, 1990)
- The Firebird's Dance (불새의 춤 - Bulsae-ui chum, 1991)
- A Long Journey into Night (밤으로의 긴 여로 - Bam-eulo-ui gin yeolo, 1991)
- The Swamp Haze Will Not Clear (늪속에 불안개는 잠들지 않는다 - Neupsog-e bul-angaeneun jamdeulji anhneunda, 1992)
- The Wings of Heroes (영웅들의 날개짓 - Yeoung-ungdeul-ui nalgaejis, 1993)
- The Sunflower Waits For The Night (밤을 기다리는 해바라기 - Bam-eul gidalineun haebalagi, 1994)
