= Yonder (TV series) =

2022 South Korean television series

- Promotional poster
- Also known as: Beyond the Memory
- Hangul: 욘더
- RR: Yondeo
- MR: Yondŏ
- Genre: Science fiction
- Based on: Goodbye, Yonder by Kim Jang-hwan
- Developed by: TVING; Paramount Global (production investment)
- Written by: Kim Jeong-hoon; Oh Seung-hyun
- Directed by: Lee Joon-ik
- Music by: Lee Ji-soo
- Country of origin: South Korea
- Original language: Korean
- No. of episodes: 6

Production
- Executive producers: Kim Ji-hoon; Seo Yeon-Jae (CP)
- Producer: Oh Seung-hyun
- Running time: 30 minutes
- Production companies: Doodoong Pictures; CJ ENM

Original release
- Network: TVING; Paramount+
- Release: October 14 – October 21, 2022

Yonder (Korean: 욘더) is a South Korean television series starring Shin Ha-kyun and Han Ji-min. It aired on TVING from October 14–21, 2022.

== Synopsis ==
A story that happens when a man who receives a message from his dead wife is invited to 'yonder,' an unknown space where he can meet her for the last time.

== Cast ==
- Shin Ha-kyun as Ja-hyun
- Han Ji-min as Ye-hoo
- Lee Jung-eun as Se-rin
- Jung Jin-young as Doctor K
- Bae Yoo-ram as Pro Park
- Choi Dae-sung
- Cha Soon-bae
- Yoon Yi-re as Peach
- Choi Hee-seo as AI Seri
- Jo Bo-bi as Joeun

== Production and release ==
This was TVING and Paramount+ first co-produced Korean series under their recent partnership between CJ ENM and Paramount Global.

On September 7, 2022, it was confirmed that the series will premiere at the 27th Busan International Film Festival in the "On Screen" section.

Yonder will set to be premiered outside Korea (alongside Japan and Taiwan, where TVING set to be launched) on Paramount+ in 2023.
