= List of Korean films =

List of Korean films may refer to:

- List of Korean films of 1919–1948, a chronology of the films of United Korea before the country's division
- Lists of South Korean films, a chronology of the films produced in the country of South Korea (post September 1948)
- List of North Korean films, a chronology of the films produced in the country of North Korean (post September 1948)
- List of highest-grossing films in South Korea, by ticket sales

== See also ==
- List of Korean-language films
