= Mother (1985 film) =

- Theatrical poster
- Hangul: 에미
- RR: Emi
- MR: Emi
- Directed by: Park Chul-soo
- Written by: Kim Soo-hyun
- Produced by: Hwang Gi-seong
- Starring: Youn Yuh-jung; Jeon Hye-seong
- Cinematography: Jung Il-sung
- Edited by: Kim Hyeon
- Music by: Yi Zong-gu
- Distributed by: Hwang Ki Seong Production
- Release date: November 1, 1985
- Running time: 100 minutes
- Country: South Korea
- Language: Korean

Mother (Korean: 에미; RR: Emi; 어미; Eomi; also known as Woman Requiem) is a 1985 South Korean film directed by Park Chul-soo. It won several awards at the Grand Bell Awards, including Best Film.

== Plot ==
After the rape and subsequent suicide of a college student, her mother takes revenge on those responsible.

== Cast ==
- Youn Yuh-jung
- Jeon Hye-seong
- Shin Seong-il
- Kim In-tae
- Hong Seong-min
- Kook Jong-hwan
- Yang Taek-jo
- Song Ok-sook
- Jeon In-taek
- Nam Po-dong

Preceded by Adultery Tree	Grand Bell Awards for Best Film; 1985	Succeeded by Pillar of Mist
