= Park Chul-soo =

South Korean film director, producer, screenwriter and actor

- Born: November 20, 1948; Daegu, South Korea
- Died: February 19, 2013 (aged 64); Yongin, Gyeonggi Province, South Korea
- Occupations: Film director; screenwriter; film producer; actor
- Years active: 1978–2013

Korean name
- Hangul: 박철수
- Hanja: 朴哲洙
- RR: Bak Cheolsu
- MR: Pak Ch'ŏlsu

Park Chul-soo (Korean: 박철수; November 20, 1948 – February 19, 2013) was a South Korean film director, producer, screenwriter and occasional actor. He was one of the most active filmmakers in Korean cinema in the 1980s and 1990s.

== Career ==
Park Chul-soo was born in Daegu, South Korea. After graduating from Daegu Commercial High School, Park studied Economics on scholarship at Sungkyunkwan University. After graduation, he briefly worked as a teacher in his hometown, Daegu.

He began his film career as a crew member for Shin Film before making his directorial debut in 1978 with Captain of the Alley, which opened to a mediocre reception. However, success came his way through his second film released the following year, The Rain that Falls Every Night, a story about a woman who falls in love with a boxer that raped her. Sentimental and sophisticated melodramas were the mainstay films during this time of his career. His 1985 thriller Mother, featuring star actress Youn Yuh-jung in the role of a mother on a killing spree after her college student daughter is raped and commits suicide, is still considered as Korean cinema’s definitive work in the rape-revenge genre that was popular in the 1970s and 1980s. It won several categories at the Grand Bell Awards that year, including best film. Women, sex and repressed urbanites continued to be main themes of Park's movies throughout his career, although his style of expression frequently altered between outrageous and subtle.

A major change in his artistic approach came with his 1995 cult hit 301, 302 which tells the story of two women who share the same apartment building, but take very different approaches to food, sex, and the challenges of modern life. Park was arguably the first filmmaker to popularize South Korean cinema internationally when the film became one of the earliest contemporary Korean films to be released theatrically in North America.

His 1996 work Farewell My Darling was shot mostly with hand-held cameras and remains his most critically acclaimed work. It portrays a family's experience as they hold a traditional three-day funeral for an elderly man killed after falling off a bicycle. It was renowned overseas and on the festival circuit, and received the Best Artistic Contribution Award at that year's Montreal World Film Festival. Push! Push! (1997) continued Park's attempts at experimentation. His 1998 film Kazoku Cinema was adapted from the novel by Korean-Japanese writer Miri Yu, cast Japanese actors and was shot in Japanese.

After a prolonged absence from the industry, he returned to directing in the early 2000s with controversial, erotic dramas, most notably the explicit Green Chair (2003), which was inspired by the real-life affair between a high school boy and a woman in her 30s. Green Chair competed at the 2005 Sundance Film Festival and played in the Panorama of the 2005 Berlin International Film Festival. He also shot low-budget dramas about a man's relationship to sex, including Red Vacance Black Wedding (2011) and B-E-D (2013).

Increasingly an outsider of the orthodox South Korean film industry, he was a strong supporter of the Puchon International Fantastic Film Festival, despite threats to his own professional career. In its early days, PiFan was boycotted by much of the local film industry and Korean academics.

== Death ==
Park was crossing a street in the city of Yongin on February 19, 2013, when he was hit by a man driving under the influence. At the time of his death, Park had just contributed the short film Illusion (Korean: 미몽) to the omnibus A Journey with Korean Masters, and was completing post-production on a new film titled Love Conceptually.

His last feature film Eating, Talking, Faucking was released posthumously in March 2013.

== Filmography ==
1. A Journey with Korean Masters (마스터 클래스의 산책 Maseuteo Keullaeseueui San-chaek), 2013
2. Eating, Talking, Faucking (생생활활 Saengsanghalhal), 2013
3. B-E-D (베드 Bedeu), 2013
4. Red Vacance Black Wedding (붉은 바캉스 검은 웨딩 Bulgeun Bakangseu Geomeun Weding), 2011
5. Green Chair (녹색 의자 Noksaeg Uija), 2003
6. Bongja (봉자 Bongja), 2000
7. Kazoku Cinema (가족 시네마 Gajok Cinema), 1998
8. Push! Push! (산부인과 Sanbu-ingwa), 1997
9. Seven Reasons Why Beer Is Better Than a Lover (맥주가 애인보다 좋은 일곱가지 이유 Maegjuga ae-inboda Joh-eun 7gaji i-yu), 1996
10. Farewell My Darling (학생부군신위 Hagsaengbugunsin-wi), 1996
11. 301, 302 (삼공일 삼공이 Samgong-il samgong-i), 1995
12. Sado Sade Impotence (우리 시대의 사랑 Ulisidae-ui sarang), 1994
13. Flower in Snow (눈꽃 Nunkkot), 1992
14. Seoul Evita (서울, 에비타 Seo-ul-ebita), 1991
15. Theresa's Lover (테레사의 연인 Theresa-ui yeon-in), 1991
16. Ose-am Temple (오세암 Oseam), 1990
17. The Woman Who Walks on Water (물 위를 걷는 여자 Mul-wileul geodneun yeoja), 1990
18. Today's Woman (오늘 여자 Oneul yeoja), 1989
19. You My Rose Mellow (접시꽃 당신 Jeobsikkot dangsin), 1988
20. Hello Im Kuk-jeong by Pak Cheol-su (Bak Cheol-Su-ui helro Im Kkeok-Jeong), 1987
21. Pillar of Mist (안개기둥 Angaegidung), 1986
22. Mother (어미 Eomi), 1985
23. Tinker Wife (Ttamjang-i a-nae), 1983
24. Stray Dog (Deulgae), 1982
25. Is There a Girl Like Her? (Ileon yeoja eobsna-yo), 1981
26. Painful Maturity (아픈 성숙 Apeun seongsuk), 1980
27. The Rain that Falls Every Night (밤이면 내리는 비 Bam-imyeon naelineun bi), 1979
28. Captain of the Alley (Golmogdaejang), 1978

== Awards ==
- 1996 32nd Baeksang Arts Awards: Best Film and Best Director for Farewell My Darling
- 1994 18th Golden Cinematography Awards: Best Director for Sado Sade Impotence
- 1988 24th Baeksang Arts Awards: Best Director for You My Rose Mellow
- 1980 16th Baeksang Arts Awards: Best New Director for The Rain that Falls Every Night

== See also ==
- List of Korean film directors
- Cinema of Korea
