= Kwon Ji-ye =

South Korean writer (born 1960)

Kwon Ji-ye (Korean: 권지예; born 1960) is a South Korean writer. She made her literary debut in 1997 when the journal La Plume published her short story “Kkumkkuneun marionetteu” (꿈꾸는 마리오네뜨 The Dreaming Marionette) and novella Sangja sogeui pureun kal (상자 속의 푸른 칼 Blue Knife in the Box). She won the 26th Yi Sang Literary Award in 2002 for her short story "Baemjangeo styu" (뱀장어 스튜 Eel Stew) and the 6th Dongin Literary Award in 2005 for Kkotgemudeom (꽃게무덤 Crab Grave).

== Life ==
Kwon Ji-ye was born in Gyeongju, South Korea in 1960. She studied English literature at Ewha Womans University. In her time at Ewha, she was part of the literary society Darakbang (“Attic”) and won a writing contest run by the school. After graduating, however, her full-time job kept her from writing for nearly a decade. Her first job was at the publisher Minumsa and she went on to teach at a middle school. Then in 1991, she left for France and enrolled in the Asian studies program at Paris Diderot University. She wrote her doctoral dissertation on women in modern Korean literature.

The reason Kwon decided to continue her studies was that she believed a writing career would make her unhappy, even though she had wanted to become a writer since she was a student. Yet her stay in Paris turned out to spur her literary ambitions. She began writing to cope with the loneliness of living abroad. She made her literary debut in 1997 while she was still in Paris. In 1999, she returned to South Korea to focus on her literary career. She taught creative writing at Hanzhong University, but quit in 2003 to write full-time.

== Writing ==
A central theme in Kwon Ji-ye's works is love. Her novels often feature the voices of women who yearn for passion in their lives. They explore the psychology of women in love and portray how love breaks down and disappears in our everyday lives. Kwon's female protagonists often find romance through steamy affairs. They tend to have marriage troubles and attempt to fight their romantic fantasies or desire for an exciting life.

Kwon's first short story collection Kkumkkuneun marionetteu (꿈꾸는 마리오네뜨 The Dreaming Marionette) depicts protagonists cheating on their partners driven by lust. Yuhok (유혹 Seduction) is about a divorced college lecturer named Oh Yumi who flouts traditional sexual ethics and has multiple lovers.

Not all of Kwon's works focus on desires that deviate from social norms. Her 2010 novel Sawoleui mulgogi (4월의 물고기 April Fish) is about a pair of destined lovers in a monogamous relationship. Kwon mentioned in an interview that her views on love have changed as she grew older.

== Works ==
1. 사임당의 붉은 비단보(2016)

Saimdang’s Red Silk Cloth (2016)

2. 유혹(2011)

Seduction (2011)

3. 4월의 물고기(2010)

April Fish (2010)

4. 퍼즐(2009)

Puzzle (2009)

5. 붉은 비단보(2008)

Red Silk Cloth (2008)

6. 반고흐 서른일곱에 별이 된 남자(2007)

Van Gogh, the Man Who Became a Star at Thirty-Seven (2007)

7. 해피 홀릭(2007)

Happy-holic (2007)

8. 사랑하거나 미치거나(2005)

Love or Go Crazy (2005)

9. 꽃게 무덤(2005)

Crab Grave (2005)

10. 권지예의 빠리 빠리 빠리(2004)

Kwon Ji-ye’s Paris Paris Paris (2004)

11. 아름다운 지옥(2004)

A Beautiful Hell (2004)

12. 폭소(2003)

Fit of Laughter (2003)

13. 꿈꾸는 마리오네뜨(2002)

The Dreaming Marionette (2002)

=== Works in translation ===
1. Histoires insolites de Corée (French)

== Awards ==
1. 2005: Dongin Literary Award

2. 2002: Yi Sang Literary Award
