= Baeksang Arts Award for Most Popular Actress =

Part of the Baeksang Arts Awards for the most popular female actor

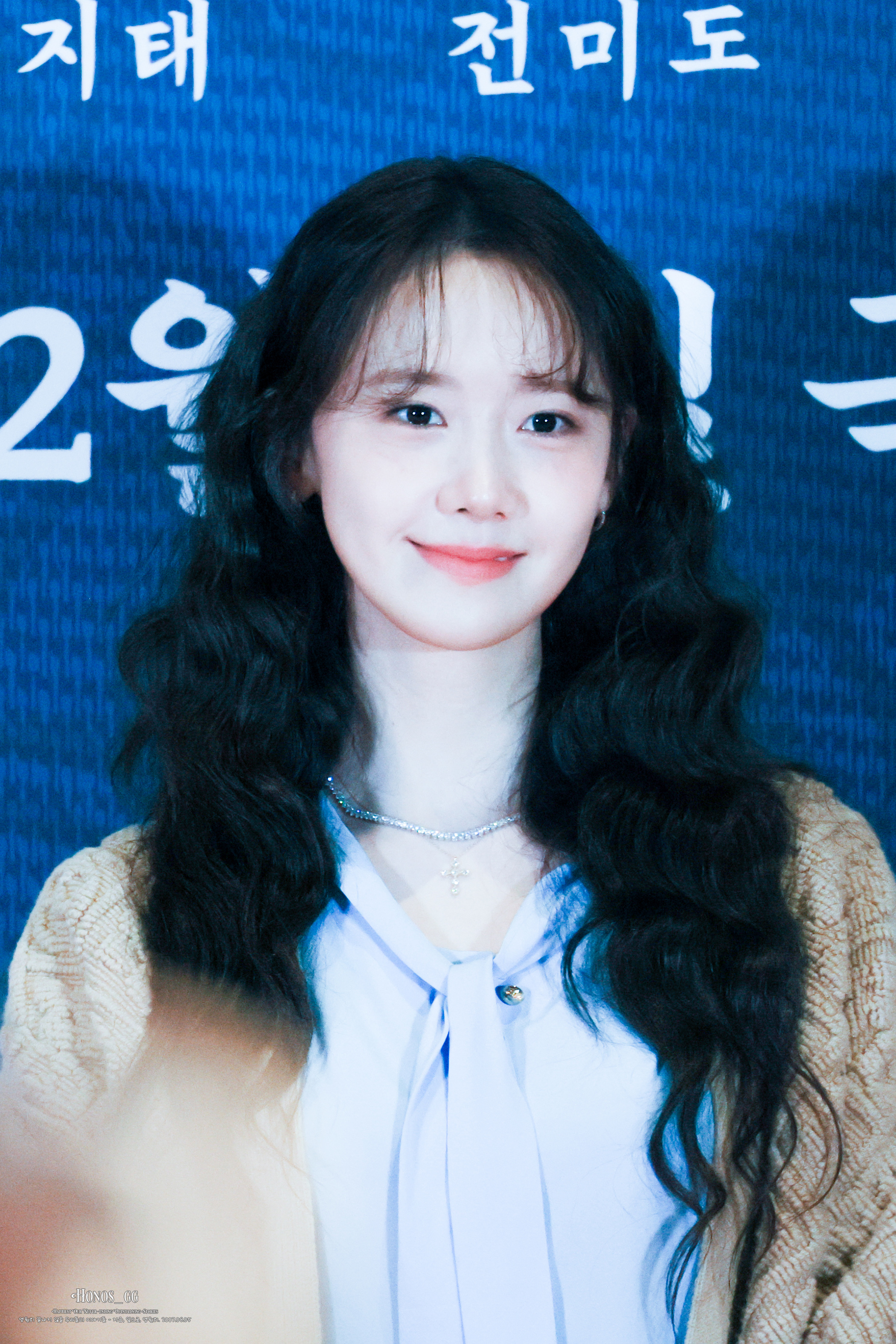
- 2026 recipient: Lim Yoona
- Awarded for: Most voted actress in the popularity poll
- Country: South Korea
- Presented by: Baeksang Arts Awards
- Most recent winner: Lim Yoona (2026)
- Website: baeksangartsawards

The Baeksang Arts Award for Most Popular Actress (Korean: 백상예술대상 인기상; RR: Baeksang Yesul Daesang Ingisang) is an award presented annually at the Baeksang Arts Awards ceremony organised by Ilgan Sports and JTBC Plus, affiliates of JoongAng Ilbo, usually in the second quarter of each year in Seoul.

Before 2018, the winners were announced in both film and television categories. The award is voted by the public and all female acting nominees from film and television categories are eligible. TikTok held the naming rights for this award from 2020 to 2023.

== List of winners ==
=== 1985–2017 ===
#	Year	Film		Television	
#	Year	Recipient	Work	Recipient	Work
21	1985	Not awarded		Go Doo-shim	The Ume Tree in the Midst of the Snow (설중매)
22	1986	Not awarded		Kim Soo-mi	Country Diaries (전원일기)
23	1987	Na Young-hee	Eve's Second Bedroom		
23	1987	Na Young-hee	Eve's Second Bedroom	Cha Hwa-yeon	Love and Ambition (사랑과 야망)
24	1988	Lee Hye-young	The Street Musician	Nam Neung-mi	Love and Ambition (사랑과 야망)
24	1988	Lee Hye-young	The Street Musician	Jeong Young-sook	Mother (어머니)
25	1989	Na Young-hee	Prostitution	Go Doo-shim	The Country Diary (전원일기)
25	1989	Na Young-hee	Prostitution	Choi Soo-ji	Land (토지)
26	1990	Kang Soo-yeon	All That Falls Has Wings	Jo Min-su	—N/a
26	1990	Kang Soo-yeon	All That Falls Has Wings	Lee Hye-sook	—N/a
27	1991	Choi Jin-sil	—N/a	Hwang Shin-hye	—N/a
27	1991	Shim Hye-jin	—N/a	Kim Ae-kyung	—N/a
28	1992	Choi Jin-sil	Susanne Brink's Arirang	Kim Young-ok	Yesterday's Green Grass (옛날의 금잔디)
28	1992	Choi Jin-sil	Susanne Brink's Arirang	Ha Hee-ra	What Is Love (사랑이뭐길래)
29	1993	Hong Yeo-jin	The Foggy Nights of Rio de Janeiro Are Deep	Jung Hye-sun	Fearless Love (두려움 없는 사랑)
29	1993	—N/a	—N/a	Choi Jin-sil	Jealousy
30	1994	Kang Soo-yeon	—N/a	Kim Hee-ae	—N/a
31	1995	Kim Hye-soo	The Eternal Empire	Ha Yoo-mi	Daughters of a Rich Family (딸부잣집)
31	1995	Choi Jin-sil	How to Top My Wife	Chae Shi-ra	My Son's Woman (아들의 여자)
32	1996	Jung Sun-kyung	A Hot Roof	Na Moon-hee	Even If the Wind Blows (바람은 불어도)
32	1996	Jung Sun-kyung	A Hot Roof	Lee Seung-yeon	Hotel (호텔)
33	1997	Choi Jin-sil	Ghost Mamma	Lee Eung-kyung	Palace of Dreams (꿈의 궁전)
33	1997	Choi Jin-sil	Ghost Mamma	Kim Won-hee	Im Kkeokjeong (임꺽정)
34	1998	Jeon Do-yeon	The Contact	Lee Mi-sook	Snail (달팽이)
34	1998	Shin Eun-kyung	Downfall	Lee Mi-sook	Snail (달팽이)
35	1999	Lee Mi-sook	An Affair	Kwon Eun-ah	Sagwangwa sinsa (사관과 신사)
35	1999	Choi Jin-sil	Mayonnaise	Song Yoon-ah	Mister Q (미스터Q)
36	2000	Ko So-young	Love	Kim Hee-sun	Tomato (토마토)
37	2001	Lee Mi-sook	The Legend of Gingko	Song Hye-kyo	Autumn in My Heart
37	2001	Lee Mi-sook	The Legend of Gingko	Jeon In-hwa	Ladies of the Palace (여인천하)
38	2002	Kim Hee-sun	Wanee & Junah	So Yoo-jin	Rival (라이벌)
38	2002	Kim Hee-sun	Wanee & Junah	Choi Ji-woo	Winter Sonata
39	2003	Ha Ji-won	Sex Is Zero	Kim Won-hee	—N/a
39	2003	Kim Jung-eun	Marrying the Mafia	Kim Won-hee	—N/a
39	2003	Kim Ha-neul	My Tutor Friend	Kim Won-hee	—N/a
40	2004	Kim Sun-a	The Greatest Expectation	Yang Mi-kyung	Dae Jang Geum
40	2004	Han Ga-in	Once Upon a Time in High School	Choi Ji-woo	Stairway to Heaven
41	2005	Not awarded		Kim Tae-hee	Love Story in Harvard
42	2006	Kim Ah-joong	When Romance Meets Destiny	Hyun Young	Bad Family
43	2007	Kim Tae-hee	The Restless	Han Ye-seul	Fantasy Couple
44	2008	Kim Jung-eun	Forever the Moment	Sung Yu-ri	Hong Gil-dong
45	2009	Park Bo-young	Scandal Makers	Lim Yoona	You Are My Destiny
46	2010	Choi Kang-hee	Goodbye Mom	Lim Yoona	Cinderella Man
47	2011	Park Shin-hye	Cyrano Agency	Moon Geun-young	Cinderella's Stepsister
48	2012	Kang So-ra	Sunny	Park Shin-hye	Heartstrings
49	2013	Park Shin-hye	Miracle in Cell No. 7	Kwon Yu-ri	Fashion King
50	2014	Kwon Yu-ri	No Breathing	Park Shin-hye	The Heirs
51	2015	Park Shin-hye	The Royal Tailor	Krystal	My Lovely Girl
52	2016	Bae Suzy	The Sound of a Flower	Song Hye-kyo	Descendants of the Sun
53	2017	Lim Yoona	Confidential Assignment	Kim Yoo-jung	Love in the Moonlight

=== 2018–present ===
#	Year	Awardee
54	2018	Bae Suzy
55	2019	Lee Ji-eun
56	2020	Son Ye-jin
57	2021	Seo Yea-ji
58	2022	Kim Tae-ri
59	2023	Lee Ji-eun
60	2024	An Yu-jin
61	2025	Kim Hye-yoon
62	2026	Lim Yoona

== Sources ==
- "Baeksang Arts Awards Nominees and Winners Lists". Naver Movie (in Korean).
- "Baeksang Arts Awards Winners Lists". Baeksang Arts Awards (in Korean).
