= 34th Baeksang Arts Awards =

1998 South Korean awards ceremony

- Date: April 6, 1998

The 34th Baeksang Arts Awards ceremony took place on April 6, 1998.

== Nominations and winners ==
Complete list of nominees and winners:

(Winners denoted in bold)

=== Film ===
Grand Prize (Film)	Best Film
-	**Christmas in August**; Blackjack; The Letter; Father
Best Director (Film)	Best New Director (Film)
**Chung Ji-young** - **Blackjack**; Jang Gil-soo - Father; Lee Jung-gook - The Letter; Kim Sung-hong - The Hole	-
Best Actor (Film)	Best Actress (Film)
**Park Joong-hoon** - **Hallelujah**; Han Suk-kyu - Christmas in August; Park Shin-yang - The Letter; Choi Min-soo - Blackjack; Park Geun-hyung - Father	**Shim Eun-ha** - **Christmas in August**; Choi Jin-sil - The Letter; Kang Soo-yeon - Blackjack; Shin Eun-kyung - Downfall
Best New Actor (Film)	Best New Actress (Film)
**Im Chang-jung** - **Beat**; Han Jung-hyun - Downfall; Park Yong-woo - The Hole	**Choi Ji-woo** - **The Hole**; Jeon Do-yeon - The Contact; Choi Jung-yoon - Father
Best Screenplay (Film)	Most Popular - Actor (Film)
**Song Neung-han** - **No. 3**; Yeo Hye-young - The Hole; Hang Hyun-geun, Park Il-seo - Blackjack	**Park Shin-yang** - **The Letter** (actor); **Shin Eun-kyung** - **Downfall** (actress); **Jeon Do-yeon** - **The Contact** (actress)

=== Television ===
Grand Prize (Television)
**Lee Jang-soo (television director)** - Offspring
Best Drama	Best Director (Television)
**Snail (SBS)**; Offspring (SBS); Walking the Road with My Son (KBS); The Mountain (MBC)	**Lee Jang-soo (television director)** - Offspring; (TBA)
Best Educational Program	Best Entertainment Program
**(TBA)**	**(TBA)**
Best Actor (Television)	Best Actress (Television)
**Yoo Dong-geun** - **Tears of the Dragon**; Kim Moo-saeng - Tears of the Dragon; Choi Bool-am - You and I; Lee Soon-jae - Palace of Dreams	**Hwang Shin-hye** - Cinderella; Choi Myung-gil - Tears of the Dragon; Go Doo-shim - Offspring; Lee Mi-sook - Snail; Jung Hye-sun - Because of Love
Best New Actor (Television)	Best New Actress (Television)
**Lee Sang-in** - **A Bluebird Has It**; Han Jae-suk - Model; Song Seung-heon - You and I	**Kim Ji-young** - **You and I**; Park Sun-young - Because of Love; Kim Nam-joo - Model
Best New Director (Television)	Best Screenplay (Television)
(TBA)	(TBA)
Best Variety Performer - Male	Best Variety Performer - Female
(TBA)	(TBA)
Most Popular - Actor (Television)	Most Popular - Actress (Television)
**Cha In-pyo** - **You and I**; **Song Seung-heon** - **You and I**	**Lee Mi-sook** - Snail
