= My Rosy Life =

2005 South Korean television series

- Hangul: 장밋빛 인생
- Lit.: A Rosy Life
- RR: Jangmitbit insaeng
- MR: Changmippit insaeng
- Genre: Melodrama
- Written by: Moon Young-nam
- Directed by: Kim Jong-chang
- Starring: Choi Jin-sil; Son Hyun-joo; Lee Tae-ran
- Country of origin: South Korea
- Original language: Korean
- No. of episodes: 24

Production
- Executive producer: Lee Deok-geon
- Producer: Bae Kyung-soo
- Production company: Pan Entertainment

Original release
- Network: KBS
- Release: 24 August – 10 November 2005

My Rosy Life (Korean: 장밋빛 인생) is a 2005 South Korean television drama series starring Choi Jin-sil, Son Hyun-joo, and Lee Tae-ran. It aired on KBS2 from August 24 to November 10, 2005 on Wednesdays and Thursdays at 21:55 for 24 episodes.

My Rosy Life was a huge hit, with average viewership ratings of 34.2%, and reaching 47% at its peak. It was the second top-rated Korean drama of 2005 (next to MBC's My Lovely Sam Soon), and was the highest rated among all the KBS dramas aired that year.

It is especially notable for the much-praised performance of lead actress Choi Jin-sil. Playing the role of a deserted wife who later discovers that she has cancer, My Rosy Life resurrected Choi's career. Widely known as "Korea's Sweetheart" in her 15-year acting career, Choi's image as the eternal girl next door was destroyed in 2004 after her acrimonious and highly publicized divorce from baseball player Cho Sung-min, and industry insiders predicted that her career was over. But Choi made a successful comeback in My Rosy Life, as she reinvented herself as a more approachable "ajumma" (the Korean term for a middle-aged married woman), gaining six kilograms for the role. The pain and suffering of Choi's character blurred the line between reality and fiction, and her performance aroused empathy from TV audiences; with My Rosy Life, she received the best reviews of her career from viewers and critics alike.

The cast received acting recognition at the year-end KBS Drama Awards, winning nine awards combined, including Top Excellence Awards for Choi Jin-sil and Kim Hae-sook, and an Excellence Award for Son Hyun-joo.

At the Baeksang Arts Awards in 2006, Choi also won Best Actress in a TV Drama, as did Kim Jong-chang for Best TV Director.

== Plot ==
Maeng Soon-yi (Choi Jin-sil) has sacrificed everything in her life for the sake of others. She missed out on her youth because she was too busy taking care of her father (Jang Yong), who started drinking heavily after her mother abandoned them when Soon-yi was 10 years old. Soon-yi gave up on her own education so that she could earn the money to pay for her younger siblings' tuition.

Soon-yi's younger sister Young-yi (Lee Tae-ran), is now a successful career woman. She is having an affair with a married man, Lee Jung-do (Jang Dong-jik). Jung-do was Young-yi's first love, but he broke up with her for the sake of his career. While younger brother Chul-soo has settled down in the United States where he's earning his doctorate degree, completely ignoring his responsibilities at home.

Soon-yi perseveres despite the constant hardships that life throws at her. Until one day, she is jolted when Ban Sung-moon (Son Hyun-joo), her husband with whom she has two daughters, tells her that he has fallen in love with another woman and demands a divorce. Worse, she is diagnosed with stomach cancer shortly after.

Abandoned by everyone around her, all those whom she has worked so hard to make happy her entire life, Soon-yi decides that it's never too late to start living the life you want, and begins to be a little selfish and find some true happiness.

When they find out about her disease, her family finally realizes what she means to them. And her husband Sung-moon also rethinks his actions and finally shows her the genuine meaning of marital love.

== Cast ==
=== Main ===
- Choi Jin-sil as Maeng Soon-yi
- Son Hyun-joo as Ban Sung-moon
- Lee Tae-ran as Maeng Young-yi

=== Supporting ===
- Na Moon-hee as Ggot Soon-yi, Sung-moon's mother
- Jang Dong-jik as Lee Jung-do
- Kim Ji-young as Miss Bong
- Ahn Sun-young as Ban Sung-hae
- Kwon Hae-hyo as Chun Won-man
- Jang Yong as Mr. Maeng
- Jo Eun-sook as Oh Mi-ja, Sung-moon's mistress
- Choi Ji-na as Hong Jang-mi, Jung-do's wife
- Kim Hae-sook as Soon-yi's birth mother
- Namkoong Min as Dr. Ji Bak-sa

== Contract dispute ==
Rival network MBC initially wouldn't allow actress Choi Jin-sil to star in KBS's My Rosy Life, claiming she was still under contract with them to act in 300 drama episodes, of which she had completed 250. Since her divorce and its ensuing scandal, MBC had not cast Choi in any dramas for one year, and Choi asked to be released from her contract, but the network refused and took legal action. They eventually reached an out-of-court settlement that enabled Choi to make the KBS drama, after which she finished the remainder of her contract by starring in the 2007 MBC drama Bad Woman, Good Woman.

== Awards and nominations ==
2005 KBS Drama Awards

- Top Excellence Award, Actress: Choi Jin-sil
- Top Excellence Award, Actress: Kim Hae-sook
- Excellence Award, Actor: Son Hyun-joo
- Best Supporting Actress: Kim Ji-young
- Popularity Award: Lee Tae-ran and Namkoong Min
- Netizen Award: Choi Jin-sil
- Best Couple Award: Choi Jin-sil and Son Hyun-joo

2006 Baeksang Arts Awards

- Best TV Actress: Choi Jin-sil
- Best TV Director: Kim Jong-chang
- Nomination - Best Drama
- Nomination - Best TV Actor: Son Hyun-joo
- Nomination - Best TV Screenplay: Moon Young-nam

== International broadcast ==
In 2006, it was aired in the Philippines on GMA Network, and in Indonesia on Indosiar. The Tagalog-dubbed version was re-aired three times on GMA Life TV from January 20, 2014 – April 11, 2014; June 30, 2014 – September 19, 2014 and June 29, 2015 – September 18, 2015. It was aired in Vietnam on HTV9 on 8 August 2007, every 6:30am Sunday to Wednesday.
