= Cho Sung-min (disambiguation) =

Cho Sung-min (1973–2013) was a South Korean baseball player.

Cho Sung-min may also refer to:

- Cho Seong-min (born 1976), South Korean gymnast
- Cho Sung-min (basketball) (born 1983), South Korean basketballer for Busan KT Sonicboom
- Cho Sung-min (sailor) (born 1987), South Korean sailor for Busan City
