= List of South Korean films of 1997 =

A list of films produced in South Korea in 1997:

Title	Director	Cast	Genre	Notes
1997
3PM Bathhouse Paradise	Kwak Kyung-taek			
Baby Sale	Kim Bon			
Bad Movie	Jang Sun-woo			
Barricade	Yoon In-ho			
Beat	Kim Sung-su	Jung Woo-sung		
Blackjack	Chung Ji-young			
The Contact	Chang Yoon-hyun	Han Suk-kyu; Jeon Do-yeon		
Downfall	Im Kwon-taek	Shin Eun-kyung		
Green Fish	Lee Chang-dong	Han Suk-kyu; Shim Hye-jin		
Habitual Sadness	Byun Young-joo			
The Hole	Kim Sung-hong			
Holiday in Seoul	Kim Ui-seok	Choi Jin-sil		
The Letter	Lee Jung-gook	Choi Jin-sil; Park Shin-yang		
The Man With Flowers	Hwang In-roe			
Mister Condom	Yang Yun-ho			
Motel Cactus	Park Ki-yong	Jin Hee-kyung		
No. 3	Song Neung-han	Han Suk-kyu; Choi Min-sik	Comedy	
PpilKu	Yu Jin-seon	Lee Min-woo		
Push! Push!	Park Chul-soo			
Repechage	Lee Kwang-hoon			
Trio	Park Chan-wook	Lee Geung-young; Kim Min-jong; Jeong Seon-kyeong		
Wind Echoing in My Being	Jeon Soo-il			Screened at the 1997 Cannes Film Festival
