= My Love, My Bride =

My Love, My Bride may refer to:

- My Love, My Bride (1990 film), a South Korean film starring Choi Jin-sil and Park Joong-hoon
- My Love, My Bride (2014 film), a South Korean remake of the 1990 film, starring Shin Min-ah and Jo Jung-suk
