= KAIST Graduate School of Green Growth =

Educational institute in South Korea

Graduate School of Green Growth (GSGG) at Korea Advanced Institute of Science and Technology (KAIST) provides education and research on green business, sustainable finance, and policy through Green Business and Policy Program (MS), Green Business (MS/Ph.D.), Green MBA, and Green Business and Green Finance Track programs. Established in 2013, GSGG is located at KAIST Business School 85 Hoegiro, Dongadaemun-gu, Seoul 02455, Korea.

== Administration ==
Jae Kyu Lee (2013–2016) was the first Head of GSGG, and Kwangwoo Park succeeded the position in 2016. GSGG has 105 students and 10 faculty members in 2016.

== Rankings ==
In the 2015 Better World MBA Rankings, GSGG was ranked 4th by Corporate Knights. Aside from the 2015 ranking, it was ranked 6th in 2013. KAIST was ranked 20th in the 2015 Executive Education Rankings by Financial Times, and ranked 1st in Asia during four consecutive years (2012–2015).

== Academic programs ==
=== MS in Green Business and Policy ===
Green Policy degree program at KAIST is to nurture the domestic and international green policy experts to cope with the climate change and energy shortage challenges. KAIST provides students with selected courses specializing green business, green technologies, green growth policies, green finance, etc., and helps them to understand the green industry and green technology trends. The program admits 20 students each year, and tuition fee is exempted for scholarship students.

=== MS & Ph.D in Green Business ===
The program is to research and systematize theories on green growth, green finance, green economics, and green policy and to produce outstanding scholars. The Green Management degree program as research-oriented program is opened under the Management Engineering department. Taking a track from the Management Engineering (Finance, Marketing, Organization and Strategy, IT Management, Operations Strategy and Management Science, Accounting) is mandatory. Tuition fee is exempted for scholarship students.

=== Green MBA ===
Green MBA is to initiate new enterprise globally based on green technology and to innovate traditional industry into green business. Double major with Techno MBA program is mandatory. Coursed for green growth, green technology, and green policy will be provided for the program. A prescribed scholarship will be provided, and tuition fee for other MBA course should be paid.

== Placement ==
Alumni members of GSGG currently work for leading non-profit and profit organizations such as Global Green Growth Institute, Green Climate Fund, World Bank, PWC, KPMG, Samsung Economic Research Institute, Pfizer, and others.
