= SERI =

SERI may stand for:

- Samsung Economic Research Institute, a prominent private-sector think tank in South Korea established by Samsung
- Solar Energy Research Institute, former name of the National Renewable Energy Laboratory
- State Secretariat for Education, Research and Innovation, a government body under the Federal Department of Home Affairs of Switzerland
