= Kim Il-woo =

Kim Il-woo may refer to:

- Kim Il-woo (actor, born 1953)
- Kim Il-woo (actor, born 1963)
