= Jealousy (1992 TV series) =

South Korean television series

- Hangul: 질투
- RR: Jiltu
- MR: Chilt'u
- Genre: Romance, Comedy
- Based on: Long Shadow of My Love by Yoon Myung-hye
- Written by: Choi Yeon-ji
- Directed by: Lee Seung-ryeol
- Starring: Choi Soo-jong; Choi Jin-sil; Lee Eung-kyung
- Opening theme: "Jealousy" by Yoo Seung-beom
- Country of origin: South Korea
- No. of episodes: 16

Production
- Running time: 60 minutes
- Production company: MBC Self-production

Original release
- Network: MBC TV
- Release: June 1 – July 21, 1992

Jealousy (Korean: 질투; RR: Jiltu) is a 1992 South Korean romantic comedy television series starring Choi Soo-jong and Choi Jin-sil. It aired on MBC from 1 June 1992 to 21 July 1992 on Mondays and Tuesdays for 16 episodes. The show is based on the 1991 novel, Long Shadow of My Love by Yoon Myung-hye. It is one of the highest-rated Korean dramas of all time, with 56.1% viewership ratings on its final episode, and the first Korean production to be exported and broadcast overseas.

== Background ==
It established the main cast as prominent actors of the 1990s and launched Choi Jin-sil's television career. It is considered the first "trendy" Korean drama, and one that marked the beginning of Korean romantic comedy. In 1993, China's Harbin TV imported and broadcast the TV series, making it the first Korean production to be broadcast outside the country, which helped open the Asian market to Korean drama exports, particularly to mainland China. It was aired again on July 20, 1997, re-edited into 8 episodes each with a runtime of 90 minutes, as the first television series to be rebroadcast through MBC Drama Masterpiece.

== Plot ==
The story revolves around Ha-kyung and Young-ho, who are old best friends. Ha-kyung works for a travel agency and lives with her single mother who works as editor-in-chief at a magazine publishing house. She loves hanging out with her old buddy, Young-ho, and the two share an effortless banter. Although they are long-time friends, their relationship teeters on the threshold of love and friendship.

One day, Young-ho meets Young-ae, a wealthy woman, and he soon grows infatuated with her. When Ha-kyung realizes that Young-ho has feelings for someone else, she feels bouts of jealousy and realizes Young-ho is more than just a friend to her. She suppresses her jealousy and decides to give up her feelings for him, asking Young-ae to take care of him. Ha-kyung tries to find her own way through life, while trying to maintain her friendship with Young-ho.

Ha-kyung also had a long-time secret crush on her middle-school tutor, Sang-hoon. She reunites with Sang-hoon, and the two begin to spend time together. This development does not go unnoticed by Young-ho, who soon begins to feel jealous as well. He starts seeing Ha-kyung as a woman, not just a friend, and asks her out on a date. A misunderstanding results in Ha-kyung waiting in the rain for Young-ho, who never arrives. The two try to go back to being just friends, as Ha-kyung focuses on her career and Young-ho pines for her.

After spending a year abroad, Ha-kyung returns to Seoul and reunites with Young-ho. Both soon confirm that their feelings have not changed.

== Cast ==
- Choi Soo-jong as Lee Young-ho
- Choi Jin-sil as Yoo Ha-kyung
- Lee Eung-kyung as Han Young-ae
- Lee Hyo-jung as Min Sang-hoon
- Kim Hye-ri as Bae Chae-ri
- Kim Chang-sook as Jung Sung-hee
- Im Jung-ha as Jo Sung-soo
- Kim Joo-young as Park Seong-jo
- Lee Mi-kyung as Kim Soo-won
- Jung Myeong-hyun as Jung Dong-sik
- Kim Sang-soon as Kim Chun-man
- Maeng Sang-hoon as Nam Woo-je
- Jeon Woon as Lee Soo-seong
- Park Sang-jo as Kim Young-sik

== Reception ==
Cultural critic Ha Jae-geun said, "The drama 'Jealousy' was not just considered a popular drama, but is accepted as a symbol of an era. It was the beginning of the trendy drama." The drama heralded a new wave of television shows that broke from the standard tropes of traditional dramas, and instead depicted urban lifestyles and modern attitudes.

The drama especially resonated among female viewers in their 20s who identified with the female lead. For her beauty, acting ability, and relatable portrayal of the lead character, Choi was nicknamed, "The Nation's Sweetheart" and became a widely recognized actress in South Korea.

In 2011, women's portal Ezday surveyed 1,314 netizens on the topic of 'memorable dramas from the 1990s. Jealousy was voted as the 'most memorable drama' by 20% of respondents, followed closely by Star in My Heart with 19% of the votes. For 'Best Actress of the 1990s,' Choi Jin-sil took the top spot with 34% of respondents, followed by Kim Hee-sun, Shim Eun-ha, Shin Ae-ra, Lee Seung-yeon, and Jeon Do-yeon. For 'Best Actor of the 1990s,' Jang Dong-gun was chosen by 21% of respondents, followed by Ahn Jae-wook and Choi Soo-jong.
