= You and I (TV series) =

1997 South Korean TV series

- Promotional poster
- Hangul: 그대 그리고 나
- RR: Geudae geurigo na
- MR: Kŭdae kŭrigo na
- Genre: Drama; Melodrama
- Created by: Lee Jae Gap
- Written by: Kim Jung-Soo
- Directed by: Choi Jong-Su
- Starring: Choi Jin-sil; Park Sang-won; Cha In-pyo; Song Seung-heon; Choi Bool-am; Kim Hye-ja
- Country of origin: South Korea
- Original language: Korean
- No. of episodes: 58

Production
- Producer: MBC Drama Production
- Running time: 60 minutes

Original release
- Network: MBC
- Release: October 11, 1997 – April 26, 1998

You and I (Korean: 그대 그리고 나) is a 1997 South Korean television series starring Choi Jin-sil, Park Sang-won, Cha In-pyo, Song Seung-heon, Choi Bool-am, Kim Hye-ja, Seo Yoo Jung, Kim Ji-young, and Lee Bon. It aired on MBC from 11 October 1997 to 26 April 1998 on Saturdays and Sundays at 20:00 for 58 episodes.

It is currently the highest-rated Korean drama of all time, based on single episode viewership ratings, reaching 66.9% on its final broadcast on 26 April 1998. Its average rating for its entire run was 43.7%.

== Synopsis ==
Park Jae-chul (Choi Bool-am) is an old sailor and a father to three sons and one daughter, Park Dong-gyu (Park Sang-won), Park Young-gyu (Cha In-pyo), Sang-ok (Seo Yoo Jung), and Park Min-gyu (Song Seung-heon). Park Dong-gyu is working man and carries the responsibility as the eldest in his family. He's in-love with Yoon Soo-kyung (Choi Jin-sil), and they work together to overcome all difficulties to get married. Park Young-gyu dreams of nothing but money and marrying a rich girl one day. While serving in the military, he tricked a naive country girl Mi-sook (Kim Ji-young) whom he promised to marry. Mi-sook becomes blinded by love and provided all his needs. Park Sang-ok is the only girl in the family. She's a college student. Their youngest Park Min-gyu is quiet and introverted. He distances himself from his family and people because he's troubled by the fact that he's from another mother. Though he's a talented painter, he doesn't use his talent much. His brother Park Young-gyu and the rich girl Shi-yeon (Lee Bon) always stand by his side and push him to be better.

== Cast ==
=== Main ===
- Choi Jin-sil as Yoon Soo-kyung

A cheerful, unassuming woman who grew up loved as the youngest daughter of a well-to-do family. A female employee of a medium-sized company. She chose love over the conditions of marriage, but her marriage is not easy due to conflicts with her in-laws, who have different habits and ideas, and her husband, Dong-gyu, who is a wild man. In the end, she chooses to part ways with Dong-gyu, but they never forget each other and reunite to finalize their marriage. She wants to do well in her company, but feels like she's being held back by various constraints.

- Park Sang-won as Park Dong-gyu

Soo-kyung's husband. He is an office worker with a patriarchal disposition and a bit of a hillbilly attitude, but at heart, he is a romantic. He has many friends and juniors, and is always busy because he has a wide range of interests. He often feels burdened by his troubled younger siblings and his "brash" widowed father. He feels sorry for his half-brother, Min-gyu, but finds it hard to warm up to him.

=== Supporting ===
- Cha In-pyo as Park Young-gyu

Park Dong-gyu's younger brother. A high school troublemaker whose only asset is his handsome face. After his efforts to pursue only a good daughter from a rich family, he almost achieves his dream.

- Song Seung-heon as Park Min-gyu

Park Dong-gyu's oddball youngest brother. He's a quiet troublemaker, almost mute, but when he gets into trouble, it's not on the same scale as Young-gyu's. He sees the world through a prickly lens. However, he is a kind-hearted man, and when he meets a woman in a similar situation, he feels sincere love for her, and they are both saved.

- Choi Bool-am as Park Jae-chul

Dong-gyu's father. Sailor in his prime, now a sea fishing guide. A man who never seems to grow old. He is loved and hated by his youngest son, Min-gyu, who wants to be reunited with his biological mother. Currently a widower.

- Kim Hye-ja as Kim Eun-soon

Yoon Soo-kyung's mother. A devoted mother to her children, she gives all her wealth to her son, only to find herself in debt. In hindsight, she regrets the way she raised her children, but all she has left is a mild case of dementia from the shock.

- Seo Yoo-jung as Park Sang-ok

Dong-gyu's younger sister. An immature and vain aspiring model, she dreams of quickly rising up the ranks, but has no practical skills. As an aspiring model, she meets a dangerous man, loses her heart, and is on the verge of suicide. With the help of Soo-kyung, she builds a new life.

- Kim Ji-young as Mi-sook

A strong and stubborn maiden from a village. She meets and falls in love with Young-gyu in the army, but after being abandoned by him, she gives birth to his child alone and survives by selling herbs. Eventually, she becomes Soo-kyung's sister-in-law.

- Lee Bon as Shi-yeon

The unhappy only child of a wealthy family that Young-gyu has been searching for. Due to a complicated family situation, she runs away from home and connects with Young-gyu, and is reintroduced to Min-gyu. She and Min-gyu, who have many similar tendencies, soon become close.

== Viewership ==
- In this table, the blue numbers represent the lowest ratings and the red numbers represent the highest ratings.

1997
| Ep. | Original broadcast date | Nationwide |
|---|---|---|
| 1 | October 11 | 28.6% |
| 2 | October 12 | 27.8% |
| 3 | October 18 | 28.6% |
| 4 | October 19 | 29.0% |
| 5 | October 25 | 27.5% |
| 6 | October 26 | 29.4% |
| 7 | November 1 | 26.4% |
| 8 | November 2 | 33.6% |
| 9 | November 9 | 35.0% |
| 10 | November 9 | 39.8% |
| 11 | November 15 | 28.0% |
| 12 | November 16 | 40.7% |
| 13 | November 22 | 30.8% |
| 14 | November 23 | 33.0% |
| 15 | November 29 | 29.6% |
| 16 | November 30 | 36.4% |
| 17 | December 6 | 27.3% |
| 18 | December 6 | 39.1% |
| 19 | December 13 | 37.1% |
| 20 | December 13 | 46.0% |
| 21 | December 20 | 37.2% |
| 22 | December 21 | 48.8% |
| 23 | December 27 | 40.3% |
| 24 | December 28 | 47.4% |
1998
| 25 | January 3 | 40.4% |
| 26 | January 4 | 49.4% |
| 27 | January 10 | 42.8% |
| 28 | January 11 | 47.6% |
| 29 | January 17 | 31.6% |
| 30 | January 17 | 46.2% |
| 31 | January 24 | 46.8% |
| 32 | January 25 | 46.7% |
| 33 | January 31 | 47.8% |
| 34 | February 1 | 62.9% |
| 35 | February 7 | 63.0% |
| 36 | February 8 | 60.4% |
| 37 | February 14 | 46.0% |
| 38 | February 15 | 44.8% |
| 39 | February 21 | 34.9% |
| 40 | February 22 | 49.2% |
| 41 | February 28 | 44.8% |
| 42 | March 1 | 48.6% |
| 43 | March 7 | 47.1% |
| 44 | March 8 | 49.3% |
| 45 | March 14 | 46.9% |
| 46 | March 15 | 61.6% |
| 47 | March 21 | 44.4% |
| 48 | March 22 | 61.9% |
| 49 | March 28 | 44.8% |
| 50 | March 29 | 47.7% |
| 51 | April 4 | 54.5% |
| 52 | April 5 | 58.8% |
| 53 | April 11 | 46.6% |
| 54 | April 12 | 62.4% |
| 55 | April 18 | 52.0% |
| 56 | April 19 | 58.5% |
| 57 | April 25 | 48.7% |
| 58 | April 26 | 66.9% |
| Average | | 43.7% |
