= Choi Jin-sil =

South Korean actress (1968–2008)

- Choi in September 2008
- Born: December 24, 1968; Seoul, South Korea
- Died: October 2, 2008 (aged 39); Seoul, South Korea
- Cause of death: Suicide by hanging
- Resting place: Gapsan Park, Yangpyeong County, Gyeonggi Province
- Occupation: Actress
- Years active: 1988–2008
- Spouse: Cho Sung-min (m. 2000; div. 2004)
- Children: 2
- Family: Choi Jin-young (brother)

Korean name
- Hangul: 최진실
- Hanja: 崔眞實
- RR: Choe Jinsil
- MR: Ch'oe Chinsil

Signature
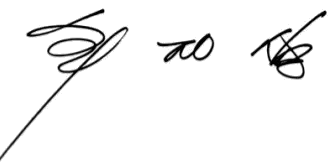

Choi Jin-sil (Korean: 최진실; December 24, 1968 – October 2, 2008) was a South Korean actress. She was considered one of the greatest actresses in South Korea, nicknamed "The Nation's Actress" for playing leading roles in some of the highest-rated Korean dramas of all time such as Jealousy (1992), Season of Storms (1993), Star in My Heart (1997), You and I (1997) and My Rosy Life (2005). Her film work includes North Korea's Southern Army (1990), My Love, My Bride (1990), Susanne Brink's Arirang (1991) and The Letter (1997). Widely regarded as the most popular actress of her time, she led the entertainment industry in terms of commercial success across film, television, and advertising. She played leading roles in 18 films and 20 television dramas, appeared in hundreds of advertisements, and won several awards. She was 39 when she died by suicide by hanging on October 2, 2008, at her home in Seoul after being the victim of distressing rumours.

== Early years ==
Choi was born as the first child to her parents Choi Guk-hyeon and Jung Ok-suk on December 24, 1968, in Eunpyeong District, Seoul, South Korea. Her mother separated from her father in 1985 and divorced him in 1998. She had a younger brother, Choi Jin-young, who was an actor and singer, and two elder half-brothers, brought in by her father from a previous relationship. Her mother only knew of the other children after marrying her father.

When she was two years old, her father, a taxi driver, contracted tuberculous pleurisy and was unable to work, selling the taxi he owned. At the age of four, she lived with her extended family—father, mother, younger brother, three aunts, three uncles, and a grandmother—in a rundown three-room shack in the mountain village of Gupabal. Her poverty-stricken mother took Choi and her younger brother up a hill to commit suicide, but the attempt failed and they returned home crying. When she was ten, her father went to work as a laborer in the Middle East, and her family moved to Bulgwang-dong, Eunpyeong District. She attended Dongmyeong Girls' Middle School while actress Kang Soo-yeon attended Dongmyeong Girls' High School, and both schools are located within the same fence. Choi admired Kang, who started her career as a child actress in the 1970s. She used to secretly watch the actress outside her class and even sat in her seat when no one else was in the room. She showed aptitude for physical education and was especially talented in art, winning various competitions, and her teacher encouraged her to go to art school.

Her family was so poor that her mother once managed the household by running a pojangmacha (a small street stall selling foods) when her father ran away from home. She gave up going to art school and it was only through her blind (habitual) "going to school," and the support of friends and teachers that she was able to graduate from high school. A biology teacher even paid Choi's tuition out of his own salary. She dreamed of becoming a star to escape poverty. She said in talk shows her nickname during her school days was "Choisujebi" because she used to eat sujebi (a dumpling soup) instead of ordinary meals due to the home environment. Although she later became the highest taxpayer among celebrities, she was known for frugality, even receiving Presidential Commendations for her savings activity.

She and her younger brother worked on their acting skills together and they passed the KBS Talent Recruitment Test in 1986. However, their mother did not want her to enter the entertainment industry, and she was unable to pay for her training at the broadcaster, so her dreams of becoming an actress were put on hold.

== Career ==
=== 1988–1990: Beginnings and breakthrough ===
In 1987, Choi graduated from Seonil Girls' High School. She could not afford to enter art school, so she got a job at a hotel in Seoul, right after graduation. However, she could not give up on her acting dreams and quit the hotel in 1988 and went on a two-month hunger strike. After a while, their mother surrenders and her brother helps her. Her brother, who was a senior in high school, had been working as an advertising model since his first year. He personally took her portfolio pictures and visited modeling agencies with her. Eventually, she was cast for a minor role in a commercial and began in Korea's entertainment circles as an advertising film model. She began to gain celebrity status in an advertising campaign for Samsung Electronics in which she acted as a newly wedded housewife. Her appearance caused great reactions not only among the public, but also in the advertising and entertainment industries. The "Choi Jin-sil Syndrome" was called a cultural phenomenon and casting offers poured in.

In 1988, she became a TV actress starring in the MBC historical drama, 500 Years of Joseon: Hanjungrok and steadily appeared in supporting roles on television for a year. Her first film was Nambugun: North Korean Partisan in South Korea (1990), and her performance in the film as a partisan nurse won her the Best New Actress awards at the 11th Blue Dragon Film Awards and Chunsa Film Art Awards. In the same year, she played the leading role in the hit movie My Love, My Bride (1990) and won Best New Actress at the 29th Grand Bell Awards and the Korean Association of Film Critics Awards, establishing her as an advertising model-turned film actress. Both films are the second highest-grossing Korean films of 1990 and 1991, respectively.

=== 1990–2002: Mainstream success ===
She drew attention for her spunky role in the youth drama Two Diaries (1990) where she co-starred with Chae Shi-ra in the second installment. After appearing as a guest on MBC's Quiz Academy, a quiz show for college students, she stood out for her hilarious personality, and her career continued to rise when she appeared in Our Paradise (1990), a popular youth drama about the lives of college students. In Our Paradise, she played the role of a fake student, Seung-mi, and gave a three-dimensional performance. Since it was planned for Seung-mi to leave the drama from the beginning due to Choi's conflicting schedules with other works, the character died from a terminal illness halfway through the show and viewers who wanted to see more of Choi's acting were disappointed. Through this drama, she gained sympathy and popularity, becoming an idol of the youth and new generation and started making her mark at MBC.

In 1991, she played the role of high school student Da-hye in the teen film You Know What? It's a Secret 2 about the 1980s generation that liberalized school uniforms, followed by the role of Susanne Brink (real name: Shin Yu-sook), a religious studies student at Uppsala University in Sweden, in Susanne Brink's Arirang, a film about the international adoption of South Korean children. The film was shot on location in Sweden. Choi's intimate portrayal of an adopted child impressed many audiences and earned her critical acclaim, including nominations for Best Actress at the Blue Dragon Film Awards and Baeksang Arts Awards. While living in Sweden during filming, Choi experienced the country's gender-equal family culture and took the opportunity to grow as an actress by acting in Swedish and trying out a role she had not done before. Her films succeeded in the box office, catapulting Choi to the top within two years of her debut. She was described as 'Chungmuro's money-making machine'; 'the Choi Jin-sil Syndrome, the duck that lays golden eggs'.

She expanded her solidified image of a youth star into more diverse and challenging roles as in the film The Room in the Forest where she played the role of a struggling student activist who eventually commits suicide. In November 1991, Choi became the second celebrity to appear in the MBC documentary The Human Era after national actor Ahn Sung-ki. The broadcast became a huge success with 45% viewership, and Choi gained national favor with the public, across all generations, with her previously unseen image of a friendly commoner through The Human Era: The Truth About Choi Jin-sil. The title is a wordplay on her name, Jin-sil (진실 lit. "truth").

Choi in the early 1990s

After several experiences in TV dramas as a supporting actress, Choi debuted on a leading role in the MBC drama Jealousy (1992), which recorded the highest viewership rating of 56.1% and became the first Korean production to be broadcast outside the country. In 1993, China's Harbin TV imported and broadcast the series, making it a bridgehead for the export of Korean dramas to the Asian market, especially mainland China, which was dominated by Japanese dramas. The term "trendy drama" was first used to describe Jealousy. Cultural critic Ha Jae-geun said, "The drama [Jealousy] was not just considered a popular drama, but is a symbol of an era. It was the beginning of the trendy drama." Trendy dramas refer to movies or TV dramas that delve into the tastes of the younger people by featuring popular stars as the main characters and depicting city life, cutting-edge fashion, and new generation mindsets. The drama was a breath of fresh air, breaking away from the standard tropes of most dramas of the past. It approached the public from a new perspective, portraying the unique yet realistic lifestyles of young people in their 20s and 30s, and marked the beginning of Korean romantic comedies. Choi naturally portrayed the bright, cheerful, yet sharp Ha-kyung, becoming a symbol of the new generation of working women. For her beauty, acting ability, and relatable portrayal of the lead character, Choi was nicknamed, "The Nation's Sweetheart" and became a beloved national actress. She starred in a string of successful dramas and films in the following years, such as the film Mister Mama (1992) with Choi Min-soo, the MBC melodrama Season of Storms (1993) and the comedy film How to Top My Wife (1994).

In 1994, Choi starred in the film I Wish for What Is Forbidden to Me, which dealt with gender violence and opened a new chapter in the history of Korean feminist films. Choi sought to transform her acting by appearing in socially weighty works and even invested her appearance fee on the film's production costs, as a response to the mounting crisis in Korean cinema concerning underfunded projects. Choi's participation as the lead actress and producer was said to be due to her close relationship with the producers and director, as well as her strong attachment to the role of the main character, Kang Min-ju, who is a villain protagonist. "In order to save Korean cinema, not only producers and directors but also actors need to step up to the plate," Choi said at the time, adding, "I want to show a new image in good films regardless of appearance fees." She won Best Film Actress at the 30th Baeksang Arts Awards for her performance. She also co-starred with Lee Byung-hun in the SBS drama Scent of Love which recorded high viewership ratings. She won consecutive Top Excellence Awards at the SBS Drama Awards for the two years that she spent at the broadcasting network.

In January 1995, she won the Grand Prize in the CF category at the 1st Korea Model Festival for her work as a commercial model since her debut in the advertising industry. She was later reunited with Lee Byung-hun in the 1995 romantic comedy film Who Drives Me Crazy and the SBS action drama Asphalt Man, which was one of the major productions of its time. In the second half of the year, she enrolled in the Department of Performing Arts (Theater and Film) at Chung-Ang University, School of Arts, to study acting professionally. Choi had a desire to learn acting systematically, starting with breathing and vocalization. In November, she received the Best Actress award at the 33rd Grand Bell Awards for the box office hit How to Top My Wife. At the time, she was filming Asphalt Man on location in the U.S., so her mother accepted the award on her behalf.

Exhausted from a series of strong performances since her debut, Choi took time to recharge her energy by reading books and chose a film that was less demanding than television. The film was Ghost Mamma (1996), a huge box office success where she plays the role of a woman who dies and reappears before her husband in the form of a ghost. The film's success led to a flurry of commercials and articles saying, "Choi Jin-sil has hit her second peak". Around the same time, Choi was offered a role in the experimental film Holiday in Seoul by director Kang Woo-seok, who was also the producer of the film. The role of the decadent hotel telephone operator played by Choi was originally intended for actress Kim Nam-joo, but when she dropped out due to a disagreement with the film company, Kang asked Choi, who had always been close to him, to play the role. Kang thanked Choi for her appearance with an unprecedented casting fee.

In 1997, she top-billed the biggest domestic film of the year, The Letter, and the highest-rated Korean drama of all time, You and I. Another hit drama, Star in My Heart was one of the earlier Korean dramas to air outside Korea and its popularity elevated the main cast to Hallyu stardom. The term Hallyu (Korean: 한류) which comes from Mandarin 韓流, (Pinyin: hán liú; lit. "Korean Wave") was coined in the late 1990s after the success of the drama in China, marking the first generation of the Korean Wave.

Choi broke her exclusive contract with SBS when she accepted the lead role in the MBC drama Star in My Heart (1997). Ten years after her debut, she maintained her good-natured and vivacious image and made a splendid return to MBC. Even though there were sloppy plot developments, Choi's one-two punch portrayal of orphan Lee Yeon-hee and fashion photographer Sophia was praised; with her eyes, tone of voice, body language, and gestures making the characters feel like completely different people. The drama recorded viewership ratings of around 50% in Korea and became incredibly popular in China. Considered one of the first Korean Wave dramas, it also gained popularity in Taiwan and Vietnam, and is the first Korean drama to be exported to Mexico, Central America and South America, where it recorded viewership ratings comparable to primetime dramas despite being in the daytime slot.

In November 1997, The Letter was released and became the number one film at the Korean box office from 1997 to 1998. It won the Audience Choice Award for Most Popular Film while Choi received her eighth Popular Star Award at the 19th Blue Dragon Film Awards. Gulbongsan station became a famous landmark when it was used as a filming location. She was cast in the film in April 1997, when Star in My Heart was just getting off the ground. Choi, who immediately warmed to the suspense element of Ghost Mamma, said of The Letter which embraced the classic melodrama formula, "I'm not really confident in acting crying and weeping, but I responded when I received the script because the story is compelling..."

It was an emotionally demanding project, and when the film was finished and she was exhausted, she was offered a role in MBC's You and I, as career woman Yoon Soo-kyung. The drama aired on weekends from October 1997 to April 1998 and garnered a record-breaking 66.9% viewership rating, making it the highest-rated Korean drama of all time. Choi was recognized for her acting skills as she steadily led the center of the drama for 58 episodes. Appearing in You and I served as an opportunity for her to be highly regarded by her senior actors, establishing herself as a significant actress both in name and reality inside and outside the entertainment industry. She won the Grand Prize at the 1997 MBC Drama Awards at the end of the year for her starring performances in a trendy drama and a weekend soap opera.

In 1998, Choi published an autobiography Yes, Let's Live Truthfully Today Too, looking back at the change from an ordinary high school graduate to a famous actress. In March 1998, Korea Telecom released a public phone card modeled after Choi for a campaign to overcome the economic crisis. In June, she played advertising agency employee Seo In-young in MBC's Memories, which was originally planned for 16 episodes, but due to viewer ratings, was extended by six more episodes for a total of 22 episodes. It was also the first drama in South Korea to feature a divorced couple as the main characters. In July, she was voted Japan's favorite Korean actress, and in August, she was voted the most popular entertainer in the actor category since the founding of South Korea in a Gallup Korea poll that surveyed men and women aged between 11 and 59 across the country. In the same month, she appeared in a national promotional campaign alongside President Kim Dae-jung and several other famous celebrities, athletes, and literary figures.

In 1999, she received tremendous praise for her acting chemistry with actress Kim Hye-ja, co-starring in the drama Roses and Bean Sprouts, which recorded a highest viewership rating of 44.1%, and the film Mayonnaise, which won the Grand Prize at the Kerala International Film Festival, marking her breakthrough in art film. Written by Jeon Hye-seong, the author of the original novel, the film deals with the theme of a woman who indulges rather than a woman who sacrifices. Choi had great desire for experimental films, and wanted to work with new directors. Mayonnaise was planned with the intention of being a film that all mothers and children in the world can watch; Kim, who was cast first as the mother, suggested Choi for the role of the daughter, and so Choi was cast. The two shared a close relationship, having previously worked together on Your Toast, You and I and Roses and Bean Sprouts. Kim mentioned Choi as the junior she will never forget for the rest of her life.

In 2000, she starred in the fantasy epic The Legend of Gingko, a poorly-received blockbuster, which was the most expensive Korean film ever made at the time. In the same year, she married Cho Sung-min, and their first child, Choi Hwan-hee, was born in 2001. In 2002, Choi played the role of Lee Ok-hwa, a trading company employee in MBC's Since We Met (TV series), her first work since marriage. The role centered on the culture shock and ups and downs that Ok-hwa, a Korean-American who grew up and went to college in China, experiences when she comes to Korea. Choi was coached by her friend Jeong Sun-hee to learn how to speak realistic Yanbian dialect, which led to them filming commercials together. In this drama, she again worked with Kim Hye-ja.

She largely stayed out of the limelight, raising her two children during her high-profile divorce saga from 2002 to 2004.

=== 2005–2008: Activities resume and final projects ===
Choi in September 2008

In 2005, she returned with the KBS melodrama My Rosy Life, which was a huge success and became one of the highest-rated Korean dramas of all time. Choi reinvented herself as a more approachable middle-aged married woman, gaining six kilograms for the role. The pain and suffering of her character blurred the line between reality and fiction, and her performance aroused empathy from TV audiences; with My Rosy Life, she received the best reviews of her career from viewers and critics alike. The series won her the Top Excellence Award at the KBS Drama Awards and Best Actress at the 42nd Baeksang Arts Awards. She also ranked first among all genders and age groups in the 'Talent that Shined this Year' survey by Gallup Korea.

Rival network MBC initially would not allow Choi to star in KBS's My Rosy Life, claiming she was still under contract with them to act in 300 drama episodes, of which she had completed 250. They eventually reached an agreement that enabled Choi to make the KBS drama, after which she finished the remainder of her contract by starring in the 2007 MBC drama Bad Woman, Good Woman.

Her last work was Last Scandal (2008), generating many positive reviews from critics and viewers. Through this, Choi, who was the main character of Korea's first trendy drama, also became the main character of the trendy drama for the middle-aged. Although it was a drama aimed at the middle-aged, the audience broadened to include younger generations and gained a lot of popularity among teenagers and those in their 20s. A second season of Last Scandal was being planned for broadcast in November 2008 before her death. She was also an MC in a talk show, Choi Jin-sil 'Truth and Lie' in 2008. As it was Choi's first time hosting a show, it received a lot of public attention and was a huge success, and a second season was scheduled. Not only did Choi receive the best treatment in the industry with a higher per-episode appearance fee than Yoo Jae-suk, but she also received the highest level of program publicity.

== Status and recognition ==
Choi in the late 1990s

After the 1988 Seoul Olympics, the Korean economy took a leap forward, color TVs became widespread, and Choi's image on screen was exquisite. With the success of the Samsung Electronics commercial in 1988, she turned the relationship between advertising model and actor upside down. While commercial modeling was often a sideline after an actor gained recognition through the success of a drama, Choi's commercials gave her the same recognition that an actor gained through a drama, showing that the advertising world could be an equally stately stage for an actor. Her swift rise to stardom coincided with the dramatic changes in South Korea's political, economic, social, and cultural landscape. Samsung Electronics used the 1988 Seoul Olympics to boost the popularity of color TVs, and Choi helped the company beat out its competitors to the top spot in home appliance sales, appearing in commercials for most of their products.

Choi believed that commercials, even as 30-second videos, have an aesthetic that captures the spirit of the times, and that they are an integration of artistic activities; from basic visual arts, marketing techniques and image-making that borrowed from psychology, to the brilliant slogans and dialogue. In an interview with CyberTimes.TV, Choi said that she considers her commercials as part of her work as an actress. Her success as an advertising model was apparent in her endorsements for South Korean giants Samsung, LG, Lotte, KIA Motors, Hyundai, Korea Telecom, and various clothing and cosmetics brands, among others. She maintained a relationship with KT and Samsung throughout the 1990s and 2000s, and was a contributor for the latter's increase in market share. As an expression of goodwill, she filmed a free commercial for KIA Motors when the company was facing bankruptcy due to the Asian financial crisis.

In October 1992, Choi became the first celebrity to throw out the first pitch in the KBO League Korean Series. In a public opinion poll on 'Advertising Model Preference' conducted by the Korea Broadcast Advertising Corporation, she ranked first overall with 52% of the votes, while Yoo In-chon ranked first among male advertising models with 13%. She consistently topped consumer preference surveys and is the most-loved advertising model of her time. In the same month, she was invited to the Blue House luncheon hosted by President Roh Tae-woo as a person of merit in saving. In December 1992, she was awarded the inaugural Star of the Year Award by the weekly broadcast information magazine TV Journal.

Ma Jeong-mi, a culture researcher and advertising critic, published a book called The Choi Jin-sil Syndrome (Chungha, 1993; ISBN 978-89-403-0163-0). The book analyzes "Choi Jin-sil and eroticism", "The product aesthetic of Choi Jin-sil", "The new generation theory symbolized by Choi Jin-sil," and "The relationship between commercials featuring Choi Jin-sil and capitalism". Ma's cultural analysis focuses on the post-war period as 'before' and the early 1990s as 'after', when Choi began her career as an entertainer. The book, which studied popularity factors for a celebrity, broke new ground in the field of theoretical books analyzing influential stars in popular culture.

In April 1993, MBC conducted a poll among students to determine 'Korea's Top 100 Stars', including all public figures such as politicians, actors, singers, comedians, athletes, etc. President Kim Young-sam topped the list and Choi was number two, at a time when the president's popularity was soaring due to the crackdown on bribery and the disclosure of public officials' assets. Choi became the face of the real-name financial system the following year in 1994 and was invited by President Kim to a luncheon at the Blue House.

She worked at MBC from 1988 until 1993. In February 1994, she signed an exclusive contract with SBS for 100 episodes, and became the highest paid actor at the time of her move to the new network, which was known in the industry for offering huge contracts to secure big-name talents. She spent the next two years appearing in SBS dramas such as Scent of Love, Asphalt Man, and Jazz, helping raise the profile of the network. However, before completing 100 episodes, she was offered a role at MBC in 1995 and was cast in the MBC weekend drama Apartment. Her appearance in Apartment was an indication of her status, in that MBC brought back an SBS-exclusive actress despite the fact that she had left MBC, and in that SBS was willing to allow her to appear on another network, even though she still had an exclusive contract with SBS. In March 1996, SBS re-signed Choi an exclusive contract. She was offered several drama roles but had repeatedly declined, saying, "The role is not right." Since she was occupied with films and commercials, she also had to turn down offers due to scheduling conflict. A year later in 1997, MBC offered her a role in a drama, and she decided to appear in MBC's Star in My Heart. When SBS filed for a preliminary injunction, then MBC President Lee Deuk-ryul reportedly went to the top management of SBS and asked for leniency. MBC executives also personally visited SBS executives. Unlike in 1995, SBS demanded a penalty fee from Choi as per the contract, and MBC agreed to pay the penalty instead.

In late 1994, MBC's The New Human Era surveyed stars in various fields for a New Year's special titled '50 Leading Koreans', and Choi was ranked first in the actress category. On November 29, 1994, the city of Seoul held an event to bury a time capsule to commemorate the 600th anniversary of the establishment of Seoul as the capital in 1394, and also included an interview with Choi, who said, "I want to be someone who will go down in history. Please remember me. Thank you." The time capsule will be opened 400 years later in 2394.

In March 1996, she became the face of the ruling New Korea Party, the first time in the history of South Korean politics that a celebrity has been the face of a political party. The New Korea Party was founded in December 1995, dropping the name Democratic Liberal Party in an attempt to shed its military image. The party selected Choi to be the face of its newspaper advertisements in an effort to break down the rigid public image of existing political parties and make them more approachable to the people. The New Korea Party said, "Choi Jin-sil, who is popular with almost all voters from those in their 20s to those in their 60s, will help enhance the image of the party. It was a choice to break away from the politics of the authoritarian era," and added, "Our party will do our best to avoid compromising Choi Jin-sil's popularity."

In a 1997 survey of public figures who fulfilled their ambitions, Choi was ranked as the number one celebrity, along with then president Kim Young-sam as the number one politician, Hyundai Group founder Chung Joo-young as the number one businessman, and baseball player Park Chan-ho as the number one sportsman. In October 1997, Samsung Economic Research Institute published a report titled Star Power Analysis of Korean Movie Stars, analyzing the power of 50 leading actors in 529 films released in Seoul from 1988 to 1995. Choi was selected as the movie star with the best audience mobilization power along with actor Choi Min-soo. In December 1997, Choi and comedian Lee Kyung-kyu visited the 15th president-elect Kim Dae-jung at his home for an interview.

In March 1998, Korea Telecom released a public phone card modeled after Choi for a campaign to overcome the economic crisis. In August 1998, to celebrate the 50th anniversary of the founding of the nation, Gallup Korea conducted a survey on 'Top Celebrities of the 50 Years of the Founding of the Republic of Korea'. Choi ranked first overall in the talent and actor category for all age groups combined, beating out the most popular actors of the past and of her time. The poll surveyed men and women aged between 11 and 59 across the country. In the same month, she appeared in a national promotional campaign alongside President Kim Dae-jung. Although Choi was not in politics, her image as the "soft power of the masses" was used to represent the current post-authoritarian and post-military government at the time. Her success as a commercial model made her the embodiment of the zeitgeist of the populus, where politics needed to be advertised anew.

In December 1999, MBC produced a documentary that looked at modern Korean history in the 20th century, featuring 60 people, including Choi in the "Heroes and Idols" category. The program featured 20 people in each of three categories: "Leaders and Revolutionaries", "Women", and "Heroes and Idols"; and showcased these individuals who have had a significant impact on history or society in general, or who have worked to break new ground. Sunday Night, the longest-running South Korean television entertainment program, conducted a poll of 1,000 Seoul citizens on the 'Best Star of the 20th Century' in each field of the entertainment industry. Choi was voted the best star among television actors.

In October 2003, Nielsen Media Research conducted a survey on the most popular South Korean leading actors based on the top 50 television dramas with the highest viewership ratings of all time. Choi was recorded as the most prolific actor with lead roles in six TV dramas, including Promise (1992), Jealousy (1992), Season of Storms (1993), You and I (1997), Star in My Heart (1997), and Roses and Bean Sprouts (1999). Her Jealousy co-star Choi Soo-jong came in second with lead roles in five dramas.

In 2005, Choi was voted as the most popular talent among men and women according to a survey by Gallup Korea. From the result of the survey conducted among 1,502 adult men and women aged 20 and older across the country, Choi ranked first with 18.2% of the votes. She received the full support of female viewers in their 20s and 40s.

In 2010, leading Chinese portal Wang Yi selected the 'Top 10 Female Protagonists in Korean Dramas', and posted photos of actresses along with nicknames based on each actress' characteristics. Choi was voted the number one female protagonist, with netizens giving her the nickname "Eternal Cinderella" for her starring role in Star in My Heart.

In 2011, Ezday surveyed netizens about the most memorable dramas from the 1990s. Jealousy starring Choi Jin-sil and Choi Soo-jong was voted as the most memorable drama by 20% of respondents, followed closely by Star in My Heart also starring Choi and Ahn Jae-wook with 19% of the votes. For 'Best Actress of the 1990s', Choi took the top spot by a wide margin with 34% of respondents, followed by Kim Hee-sun, Shim Eun-ha, Shin Ae-ra, Lee Seung-yeon, and Jeon Do-yeon. For 'Best Actor of the 1990s', Jang Dong-gun was chosen by 21% of respondents.

On November 15, 2014, she received the Achievement Award at the 3rd Asia Pacific Actors Network (APAN) Star Awards for her contribution to the development of Korean dramas as a first-generation Hallyu actress.

In a 2015 survey for the 30th anniversary of The Daily Sports Seoul, 30 entertainment industry experts from broadcasting, film, and music were asked to reflect on 30 years of Korean entertainment. Choi was chosen as the best actress of the past 30 years, with Sports Seoul writing, "Among actresses, the most prominent is the now-deceased Choi Jin-sil. As she was voted by 10 respondents, the vacancy she left felt even bigger".

== Personal life ==
Choi went through many hardships, including poverty, fires, traffic accidents, kidnappings, assaults, robberies, stalking, and the spread of false information that persisted for 20 years.

- She developed a heart disease as a child but could not get proper treatment due to lack of money.
- She has been good at drawing since her childhood, and excelled in physical education. When she was in elementary school, she earned her pocket money by drawing cartoons for her friends.
- When she was in high school and her family was kicked out of their rented house, she took rat poison from a pharmacy and slept at her friend's house. Her stomach ached but she regained consciousness the next day. She later surmised that the pharmacist noticed her having negative thoughts and gave her another medicine instead of rat poison.
- She had a habit of biting her nails until she was 29. During her childhood, when her parents yelled at each other and fought, she could not breathe properly out of fear and developed a habit of biting her nails. She bit her nails while memorizing a script, watching a scary movie, or when she was nervous before filming.
- In 1990, she went to Saipan to film a commercial, got into a car accident, and had a leg skin graft surgery. Because of this, she filmed Nambugun with an injury.
- In 1994, her former manager Bae Byeong-su, who was an influential figure in the entertainment field, was murdered by her road manager. She was called in as a witness. The incident shocked the Korean public. Rumors circulated that she was implicated in the crime and she was defamed by unspecified individuals.
- After her address was exposed, her house has been robbed several times. She suffered anxiety, getting startled seeing the curtains at home fluttering. In 1995, to achieve psychological stability and to avoid polarizing fans and thieves, she decided to move out to a residential-commercial complex and appointed security guards.
- Lee Juno mentioned that he liked Choi Jin-sil and tried meeting her through a broadcasting representative, but it failed again and again. In the end, an incident occurred in front of her house while Lee was drunk.
- She had another traffic accident in 1995 and was often the victim of stalking, having nearly been abducted in 1994 and 1998, where her manager was seriously injured after being stabbed by the criminal.

=== Marriage and divorce ===
In 2000, her marriage to Cho Sung-min received widespread attention in South Korea. Cho was a professional baseball player with the Yomiuri Giants of Japan. They first met on a television show in 1998. Choi gave birth to a son Hwan-hee (2001) and a daughter Jun-hee (2003).

Cho insisted that Choi was a blameful spouse through the press without filing a lawsuit for divorce in December 2002. It was senseless act according to South Korean civil law. Choi privately had the consideration period in connection with divorce for about two years from 2002 to 2004. Choi had not been sued for divorce for the period. In September 2004, Choi decided to divorce Cho.

Cho committed a breach of marital fidelity, violence and defamation against Choi for about two years from 2002 to 2004. In addition, Cho borrowed money from Choi's mother and Choi's younger brother and defaulted on the debt; Cho was sued for it by them. In November 2002, Cho physically attacked Choi, who was pregnant at the time with their second child. In August 2004, Cho again assaulted her. The former violence was known to people in December 2002 by Cho and Cho insisted that the violence had been mutual attack to the press. Cho insisted that the latter violence also had been mutual attack. The case was widely publicized in the media.

Choi won the parental rights and child custody over the children on condition of exempting Cho's debt to her mother and brother as well as dropping several charges against Cho. Cho could visit his children regularly according to the mutual agreement. Choi won sole custody. In January 2008, the South Korean family register (hoju) was changed. As a result, children could now use their maternal family name. According to the register, Choi Jin-sil changed her children's surname from "Cho" (paternal family name) to "Choi" (maternal family name).

Cho's qualification as a parental authority was questioned after Choi's death. Cho showed interest in the inheritance left behind by Choi, but past issues were brought up, causing public outrage. In the aftermath, the National Assembly passed a bill prohibiting the automatic reinstatement of parental rights when one of the divorced parents dies (the "Choi Jin-sil Law", as called by the Grand National Party), preventing similar incidents from occurring. After Choi's death, her mother managed the inheritance and was awarded custody of the children. The older of the two children is singer Choi Hwan-hee, who goes by the stage name Z.flat and made his debut in November 2020.

=== Domestic violence ===
In August 2004, Choi Jin-sil came forward as a victim of domestic violence. Subsequently, an advertiser, Shinhan Engineering and Construction, claimed she had not kept her contractual obligation to "maintain dignity" as she had disclosed to the public her bruised and swollen face which was caused by the violence of her then husband. On June 4, 2009, the Supreme Court reversed a high court ruling that decided in favor of Choi in a compensation suit filed by the advertiser in 2004 against the actress, who was the model for its apartments. In handing down its ruling, the Supreme Court censured Choi for coming forward and declaring herself a victim of domestic violence, saying it constituted a failure to maintain proper "social and moral honor". Her two children became defendants as heirs.

On June 9, 2009, Korean Womenlink, the Korea Women's Hot Line, and the Korea Women's Association United issued a joint statement lambasting the ruling. Women's groups censured the Supreme Court for not realising the suffering of domestic violence victims, which included Choi. As to the ruling, the groups claimed that revealing the results of domestic violence was not a matter of "dignity" but a matter of "survival". "When a person is suffering, he or she needs to restore their dignity and social honour by disclosing the damage and seeking proper legal help as Choi did", a director of Korean Womenlink said.

== Death and commemorations ==
Choi was found hanged at her home in Seoul; the cause of death was deemed to be suicide. Police said that Choi had killed herself at around midnight. Her suicide was confirmed by the police. She was survived by her two children, her mother and younger brother Choi Jin-young, who died by suicide a year and a half later, reportedly due to being severely affected by her demise. Her ex-husband Cho also died by suicide in early 2013 and her last manager, Park, was presumed to die by the same manner later that year. Choi's suicide was linked in the media to a temporary 70% increase in suicide in South Korea, for about a month after her death; police recorded 700 more suicides in that month than would have been typical statistically.

=== Cause ===
Choi suffered great stress amid rumors circulating on the Internet that she was involved in the suicide of fellow actor Ahn Jae-hwan. On September 8, 2008, Ahn, the husband of popular comedian Jeong Sun-hee, was found dead in his car. Ahn died by suicide apparently due to distress over mounting debts. Jeong and Choi had been close friends for a long time; at his funeral, Choi appeared deeply shaken. Shortly after, rumors circulated on the web that Choi, as a loan shark, had lent a large sum of money to Ahn. On September 22, 2008, Choi sought a police probe into the source of the rumors, calling them groundless. On September 28, 2008, police arrested a securities company employee for spreading the rumors.

In response to Choi's death, the South Korean government tried to strengthen a legal push to regulate Internet postings. Politicians have reacted by proposing legislation that would impose a more rigorous real name registration requirement on the Internet and heightened punishment for libelous statements.

=== Press reaction ===
The news of her death was widely reported and large number of reporters rushed to Choi's house to cover the event. Major portal websites blocked online users from leaving comments on articles concerning Choi, fearing that some users might leave malicious comments.

"Almost 80 percent of South Korea's households have broadband access, fostering active online interactions. Most Web sites here have bulletin boards where users can post uncensored, anonymous comments, and nearly all young people run their own blogs, updating via cellphone. Such sites were a major avenue for rumors about the possible dangers of dropping a ban on American beef that fed enormous street protests and political upheaval earlier this year. Major Web portals have in recent years doubled the number of monitors to screen out online character assassination and respond more quickly to complaints of malicious rumors. But many victims still complained that vicious rumors spread so fast their reputations were ruined virtually overnight", The New York Times commented on her death on October 2, 2008.

"She was more than South Korea's Julia Roberts or Angelina Jolie. For nearly 20 years, Choi was the country's cinematic sweetheart and as close to being a 'national' actress as possible. But since her body was found on Oct. 2, an apparent suicide, she has become a symbol of the difficulties women face in this deeply conservative yet technologically savvy society. Her suicide has gripped the nation, dominating headlines as authorities, relatives and even the government try to determine what went wrong. Incessant online gossip appears to have been largely to blame for her death. But it's also clear that public life as a single, working, divorced mom—still an outcast in South Korea—was one role she had a lot of trouble with", Time commented on her death on October 6, 2008.

=== Grave and memorial park ===
After her funeral, Choi was cremated and her ashes were buried at Gapsan Park Cemetery in Yangpyeong County, Gyeonggi Province. The gravesite was purchased by the Gangnam Joongang Baptist Church, which Choi attended during her lifetime. She was the first celebrity and church member to be buried in the cemetery. Her brother Choi Jin-young was buried beside her after he died in 2010. Memorial services are held at Gapsan Park every year on her death anniversary. After Choi was laid to rest here, it became so popular that there was a long waiting list of more than a month for a plot. Her heart-shaped tombstone reads, "The sweetheart of all! The lovely girl rests in this place." (만인의 연인! 사랑스러운 그녀 이 곳에 잠들다) along with an image of her. Around the tomb are autograph books and photos taken throughout her life and career. There is also a dedicated mailbox for fan letters. The large size of the burial vault makes the place feel more like a park than a graveyard.

In the early days after the burial, the grave site is not as spacious as it is today. However, due to the large number of visitors, it became difficult to manage the cemetery, and security needed to be strengthened due to the theft of her urn that occurred in August 2009. At the request of fans, the area was expanded to almost thrice its original size which could accommodate 16 charnel houses, and amenities for visitors were erected, such as benches and a teepee with a drinking water fountain and a guest book. Her tomb was remodeled to its current form to coincide with the first anniversary of her death.

==== Theft of urn ====
On August 4, 2009, Choi's ashes were stolen from her burial site. The police hunt for a suspect was aided by surveillance camera images showing a man carrying out the theft. On August 26, 2009, police arrested the offender Mr. Park and Choi's ashes were found in his home in Daegu. In December 2009, Park was sentenced to one year and six months in prison.

Following the theft of the ashes, Gapsan Park was renovated and CCTV around Choi's graveyard was expanded. The charnel was replaced with a cylindrical pillar, which was topped by a sculpture with Choi's face engraved on it. A small memorial park was built near the tomb from which her ashes were stolen. Eighteen pumice stone plaques with posters of Choi's film appearances are displayed, and a small park with a star-shaped sculpture, two tables, and ten stone chairs was set up to honor her memory. After the tomb was reconstructed, it was pointed out that the sculpture of Choi's face was not lifelike, and a mistake was found in the letters inscribed on the sculpture, so it was replaced with the current tombstone.

On September 29, 2009, Choi's ashes were reinterred at Gapsan Park. During her lifetime, she had visited the park several times with Choi Jin-young and was very fond of the place, so her brother decided to reinter her ashes in the same location despite the unfortunate incident. Security devices have been installed to prevent a recurrence of the theft, with more surveillance cameras placed around the specially manufactured tomb.

=== Choi Jin-sil Foundation ===
Choi was the "big sister" who led the so-called "Choi Jin-sil Association". It was a friendly group of close celebrities that included the comedians Lee Young-Ja and Jeong Sun-Hee, the models Hong Jin-kyung and Lee So-Ra, and the actresses Choi Hwa-jung and Uhm Jung-hwa. After Choi's death, they founded The Choi Jin-sil Foundation for charity.

=== Drama synopsis ===
The drama synopsis As Life Goes On (사노라면) which Choi had written was found in her home after her death.

== Filmography ==
=== Film ===
Year	Title	Korean	Role
1990	Nambugun	남부군	Park Min-ja
1990	You Know What? It's a Secret 2	있잖아요 비밀이에요 2	Da-hye
1990	Kkokjiddan	꼭지단	Hye-ji
1990	My Love, My Bride	나의 사랑, 나의 신부	Oh Mi-young
1991	Susanne Brink's Arirang	수잔 브링크의 아리랑	Susanne Brink
1991	The Room in the Forest	숲속의 방	So-young
1992	Mister Mama	미스터 맘마	Yeong-ju
1993	The Girl for Love and The One for Marriage	사랑하고 싶은 여자, 결혼하고 싶은 여자	Yura
1994	How to Top My Wife	마누라 죽이기	Jang So-young
1994	I Wish for What Is Forbidden to Me	나는 소망한다, 내게 금지된 것을	Kang Min-ju
1995	Mom Has a New Boyfriend	엄마에게 애인이 생겼어요	Eun-jae
1995	Who Drives Me Crazy	누가 나를 미치게 하는가	Joo-young
1996	Ghost Mamma	고스트 맘마	Cha In-joo
1997	Baby Sale	베이비 세일	Ji-hyun
1997	Holiday in Seoul	홀리데이 인 서울	Telephone operator
1997	The Letter	편지	Lee Jeong-in
1999	Mayonnaise	마요네즈	Ah-jung
2000	The Legend of Gingko	단적비연수	Bi

=== Television ===
Year	Title	Korean	Role
1988	500 Years of Joseon: "The Memoirs of Lady Hyegyeong"	조선왕조 오백년: 한중록	Jang-mi
1989	500 Years of Joseon: "Pamun"	조선왕조 오백년: 파문	Park Seon-ah
1989	Sleepless Tree	잠들지 않는 나무	Chan-joo
1989	Your Toast	당신의 축배	Kim Bum-gyeong
1990	Love Opened in Every Room	각시방 사랑 열렸네	Oh Do-hee
1990	Two Diaries	두 권의 일기	Kim Hae-ri
1990	Our Paradise	우리들의 천국	Go Seung-mi (first lead role)
1992	Enchantment	매혹	Ji-hoon
1992	Promise	약속	Jeong-in
1992	Jealousy	질투	Yoo Ha-kyung
1993	Season of Storms	폭풍의 계절	Lee Jin-hee
1994	Scent of Love	사랑의 향기	Yeong-jin
1995	Asphalt Man	아스팔트 사나이	Oh Hwa-ryeon
1995	Jazz	째즈	Chae Song-hwa
1995	Apartment	아파트	Cha Na-ri
1997	Star in My Heart	별은 내 가슴에	Lee Yeon-hee / Sophia
1997	You and I	그대 그리고 나	Yoon Soo-kyung
1998	Memories	추억	Seo In-young
1999	Roses and Bean Sprouts	장미와 콩나물	Son Mi-na
2002	Since We Met (TV series)	그대를 알고부터	Lee Ok-hwa
2004	War of the Roses	장미의 전쟁	Oh Mi-yeon
2005	My Rosy Life	장밋빛 인생	Maeng Soon-yi
2007	Bad Woman, Good Woman	나쁜여자 착한여자	Lee Se-young
2008	Last Scandal	내 생애 마지막 스캔들	Hong Seon-hee

== Awards and nominations ==
Name of the award ceremony, year presented, category, nominee of the award, and the result of the nomination
Award ceremony	Year	Category	Nominee / Work	Result	Ref.
APAN Star Awards	2014	Achievement Award	Choi Jin-sil	Won	
Baeksang Arts Awards	1991	Best New Actress – Film	Nambugun	Nominated	
Baeksang Arts Awards	1991	Most Popular Actress – Film	My Love, My Bride	Won	
Baeksang Arts Awards	1992	Best Actress – Film	Susanne Brink's Arirang	Nominated	
Baeksang Arts Awards	1992	Most Popular Actress – Film	Susanne Brink's Arirang	Won	
Baeksang Arts Awards	1993	Best Actress – Film	Mister Mama	Nominated	
Baeksang Arts Awards	1993	Best Actress – Television	Jealousy	Nominated	
Baeksang Arts Awards	1993	Most Popular Actress – Television	Jealousy	Won	
Baeksang Arts Awards	1994	Best Actress – Film	I Wish for What Is Forbidden to Me	Won	
Baeksang Arts Awards	1995	Best Actress – Film	How to Top My Wife	Nominated	
Baeksang Arts Awards	1995	Most Popular Actress – Film	How to Top My Wife	Won	
Baeksang Arts Awards	1996	Best Actress – Television	Apartment	Nominated	
Baeksang Arts Awards	1997	Best Actress – Film	Ghost Mamma	Nominated	
Baeksang Arts Awards	1997	Most Popular Actress – Film	Ghost Mamma	Won	
Baeksang Arts Awards	1998	Best Actress – Film	The Letter	Nominated	
Baeksang Arts Awards	1999	Most Popular Actress – Film	Mayonnaise	Won	
Baeksang Arts Awards	2006	Best Actress – Television	My Rosy Life	Won	
Blue Dragon Film Awards	1990	Best New Actress	Nambugun	Won	
Blue Dragon Film Awards	1990	Best Supporting Actress	Nambugun	Nominated	
Blue Dragon Film Awards	1990	Popular Star Award	My Love, My Bride; Nambugun	Won	
Blue Dragon Film Awards	1991	Best Leading Actress	Susanne Brink's Arirang	Nominated	
Blue Dragon Film Awards	1991	Popular Star Award	Susanne Brink's Arirang	Won	
Blue Dragon Film Awards	1992	Best Leading Actress	The Room in the Forest	Nominated	
Blue Dragon Film Awards	1992	Popular Star Award	The Room in the Forest; Mister Mama	Won	
Blue Dragon Film Awards	1993	Popular Star Award	The Girl for Love and The One for Marriage	Won	
Blue Dragon Film Awards	1994	Best Leading Actress	I Wish for What Is Forbidden to Me	Nominated	
Blue Dragon Film Awards	1994	Popular Star Award	I Wish for What Is Forbidden to Me	Won	
Blue Dragon Film Awards	1995	Best Leading Actress	How to Top My Wife	Nominated	
Blue Dragon Film Awards	1995	Popular Star Award	How to Top My Wife	Won	
Blue Dragon Film Awards	1997	Best Leading Actress	Ghost Mamma	Nominated	
Blue Dragon Film Awards	1997	Popular Star Award	Ghost Mamma	Won	
Blue Dragon Film Awards	1998	Best Leading Actress	The Letter	Nominated	
Blue Dragon Film Awards	1998	Popular Star Award	The Letter	Won	
Blue Dragon Film Awards	2008	Honorary Popular Star Award	Choi Jin-sil	Won	
Chunsa Film Art Awards	1990	Best New Actress	Nambugun	Won	
Grand Bell Awards	1991	Best New Actress	My Love, My Bride	Won	
Grand Bell Awards	1993	Most Popular Actress	The Girl for Love and The One for Marriage	Won	
Grand Bell Awards	1994	Best Actress	I Wish for What Is Forbidden to Me	Nominated	
Grand Bell Awards	1994	Most Popular Actress	I Wish for What Is Forbidden to Me	Won	
Grand Bell Awards	1995	Best Actress	How to Top My Wife	Won	
Grand Bell Awards	1997	Best Actress	Ghost Mamma	Nominated	
Grimae Awards	1998	Best Actress	You and I	Won	
Golden Cinematography Award	1991	Best New Actress	My Love, My Bride	Won	
Golden Cinematography Award	1994	Most Popular Star Award	I Wish for What Is Forbidden to Me	Won	
KBS Drama Awards	2005	Grand Prize (Daesang)	My Rosy Life	Nominated	
KBS Drama Awards	2005	Top Excellence Award, Actress	My Rosy Life	Won	
KBS Drama Awards	2005	Netizen Award	My Rosy Life	Won	
KBS Drama Awards	2005	Best Couple Award (with Son Hyun-joo)	My Rosy Life	Won	
Korea Broadcasting Association Awards	1998	Best Actress / Female Talent Award	You and I	Won	
Korean Association of Film Critics Awards	1991	Best New Actress	My Love, My Bride	Won	
Korea Model Festival	1995	Grand Prize (CF Category)	Choi Jin-sil	Won	
MBC Drama Awards	1989	Best New Actress	Your Toast	Nominated	
MBC Drama Awards	1992	Top Excellence Award, Actress	Jealousy; Promise	Won	
MBC Drama Awards	1993	Top Excellence Award, Actress	Season of Storms	Won	
MBC Drama Awards	1997	Grand Prize (Daesang)	Star in My Heart; You and I	Won	
MBC Drama Awards	1997	Top Excellence Award, Actress	Star in My Heart	Nominated	
MBC Drama Awards	1997	Best Couple Award (with Ahn Jae-wook)	Star in My Heart	Won	
MBC Drama Awards	2007	Grand Prize (Daesang)	Bad Woman, Good Woman	Nominated	
MBC Drama Awards	2007	Top Excellence Award, Actress	Bad Woman, Good Woman	Nominated	
MBC Drama Awards	2008	Grand Prize (Daesang)	Last Scandal	Nominated	
MBC Drama Awards	2008	Top Excellence Award, Actress	Last Scandal	Nominated	
MBC Drama Awards	2008	Achievement Award	Choi Jin-sil	Won	
SBS Drama Awards	1994	Top Excellence Award, Actress	Scent of Love	Won	
SBS Drama Awards	1995	Top Excellence Award, Actress	Asphalt Man; Jazz	Won	
TV Journal Star of the Year Awards	1992	Grand Prize	Choi Jin-sil	Won	
TV Journal Star of the Year Awards	1993	Excellence Award	Choi Jin-sil	Won	

== Related books ==
- Ma Jung-mi (1993). The Choi Jin-sil Syndrome. Chungha. ISBN 978-89-403-0163-0
- Lee Yo-na (1993). Choi Jin-sil, a Woman Like Tear Gas; Seo Taiji, a Man Like Poetry. 으뜸사. ISBN 978-2-00-173744-4
- Lee Ho-gyu (1995). There Is No Cinderella. 밝은세상. ISBN 978-89-85570-24-4
- Kim Kwang-soo (1997). The People Who Make Stars. 문예마당. ISBN 978-89-8299-017-5
- Choi Jin-sil (1998). Yes, Let's Live Truthfully Today Too. 책이있는마을. ISBN 978-89-88086-15-5
- Bae Guk-nam (2002). In Yeouido, Stars Rise Even During The Day. 백년글사랑. ISBN 978-89-89580-59-1
- Joo Cheol-hwan (2002). Scent of a Star. 까치. ISBN 978-89-7291-345-0
- Kang Joon-man (2006). A Walk Through Modern Korean History: The 1990s, Vol. 1. 인물과사상사. ISBN 978-89-5906-032-0
- Kang Joon-man (2007). Korean Mass Media History. 인물과사상사. ISBN 978-89-5906-053-5
- Kim Nan-do (2008). Trend Korea 2009. 미래의창. ISBN 978-89-5989-101-6
- Jung Gil-hwa (2009). Power of Records, Power of Testimony. 시대의창. ISBN 978-89-5940-140-6
- Kim Ki-ran, Choi Ki-ho (2009). A Pop Culture Dictionary. 현실문화연구. ISBN 978-89-92214-75-9
- Son Sung-min (2009). Star. 이가서. ISBN 978-89-5864-270-1
- Moon Yoon-su (2010). Advertising in Wonderland. 이담북스. ISBN 978-89-268-1028-6
- Lee Chang-se (2011). I Like Movies. 지식의숲. ISBN 978-89-5797-896-2
- Lee Jong-chul (2013). Tribute to the Generation of Heroes. 스토리하우스. ISBN 979-11-85006-02-4
- Lee Myung-se (2014). My Love, My Bride. 청조사. ISBN 978-89-7322-353-4
- Song Nak-won, Park Su-yeon (2014). Audition Acting and Monologues. 커뮤니케이션북스. ISBN 979-11-304-0200-0
- Oh Myung-hwan (2015). Drama Humanities 50. 나무와숲. ISBN 978-89-93632-47-7
- Hong Wan-shik (2015). Real-Name Legislation Theory. 피앤씨미디어. ISBN 979-11-5730-244-4
- Jang In-tae (2015). Property Division in Divorce Litigation. 유로. ISBN 978-89-93796-21-6
- Seo Jong-han (2015). Psychological Autopsy. 학고재. ISBN 978-89-5625-295-7
- Park Jang-soon (2015). The Korean Wave of the Future. 선. ISBN 978-89-6312-545-9
- Shim et al. (2015). Cinderella Choi Jin-sil, The Birth and Tragedy of a Myth. 문화다북스. ISBN 979-11-955763-0-2

== See also ==
- Suicide in South Korea
