= Kim Ji-young (actress, born 1938) =

South Korean actress (1938–2017)

- Born: Kim Hyo-sik; September 25, 1938; Chongjin, Korea, Empire of Japan
- Died: February 17, 2017 (aged 78)
- Occupation: Actress
- Years active: 1958–2017
- Agent: SidusHQ

Korean name
- Hangul: 김효식
- Hanja: 金孝植
- RR: Gim Hyosik
- MR: Kim Hyosik

Stage name
- Hangul: 김지영
- Hanja: 金志暎
- RR: Gim Jiyeong
- MR: Kim Chiyŏng

Kim Ji-young (Korean: 김지영; September 25, 1938 – February 17, 2017), birth name Kim Hyo-sik (김효식), was a South Korean actress.

== Filmography ==
=== Film ===
Year	Title	Role
1965	Hwang, Man of Wealth at Mapo	
1967	I Want to Go	
1967	A Miracle of Gratitude	
1967	The Hateful King	
1967	The Queen of Elegy	
1976	Let's Talk About Youth	
1982	Come Unto Down	Mother-in-law
1983	Village in the Mist	
1985	The Tiger Butterfly Is Lonely at Dusk	
1985	Queen Bee	
1985	Morning Without Parting	
1985	Wandering Stars	Yoo In-ja
1985	River Fork	
1985	Hwa-nyeo Village	
1985	It Happened at Night	
1985	Whale Hunting 2	
1986	Shim Hyung-rae's Detective Q	
1986	Raining on That Which Is Woman	
1986	Riding the Moonlight	
1986	Gilsoddeum	Seok-chul's wife
1986	Will Rather Become a Ball of Fire	
1986	Hwang Jin-ie	
1986	You Cannot Outdo Others	
1987	The Unfinished Song of Love	
1987	Bo-seul of Dalae River	
1987	Lethe's Love Song	
1987	Our Joyful Young Days	
1987	Do-hwa	
1987	A Woman on the Verge	
1988	Byon Gang-soi	
1988	Potato	Mistress Wang
1988	Adada	Sa-mo
1988	A Migrant Bird in a Nest	
1988	Lee Jang-ho's Baseball Team 2	Eom-ji's mother
1988	Mountain Snake	
1988	Sa Bangji	Nobility madam
1988	Jujube Girl	
1988	You Are a Flower	Owner of rental house
1989	Sweet Brides	
1989	The Wolf's Curiosity Stole Pigeons	묘지기
1989	In the Name of Memory	Mother
1989	Happiness Does Not Come in Grades	Chang-soo's mother
1989	Woo-dam-ba-ra	
1989	Shinsa-dong Gigolo	Mother-in-law
1990	All That Falls Has Wings	Female owner
1990	Time for Bed	Boutique owner
1990	The Lovers of Woomook-baemi	오바로꾸
1990	You, My Ecstatic Hell	Wife
1990	North Korean Partisan in South Korea	Village woman
1990	The Love of a Fashion Model	
1990	You Know What? It's a Secret	Jin-hee's mother
1991	Susanne Brink's Arirang	
1991	Mother, Your Son	Mother
1992	The Season of Percussions	Mrs. Ahn
1993	Watercolor Painting in a Rainy Day 2	Old woman
1997	The Rocket Was Launched	Bar hostess 1
1998	If It Snows on Christmas	Ji-won
1999	Till We Meet	Mrs. Park
2000	The Happy Funeral Director	Yeon-yi's grandmother
2001	Failan	Laundry ajumma
2001	Guns & Talks	의뢰 grandmother
2002	Break Out	Heo Bong-gu's mother
2003	...ing	Ajumma
2004	Too Beautiful to Lie	Choi Hee-cheol's grandmother
2004	Hi! Dharma 2: Showdown in Seoul	Elder bosal
2004	Arahan	Banya Ga-in
2005	Wedding Campaign	Hong Man-taek's mother
2005	My Girl and I	Owner of guest house (cameo)
2006	Maundy Thursday	Grandmother Park
2007	Mapado 2: Back to the Island	Ji Nan-daek
2007	My Son	Lee Gang-sik's mother
2007	Swindler in My Mom's House	Grandmother (cameo)
2007	Eleventh Mom	Baek-jung's mother
2009	Tidal Wave	Geum-ryeon
2009	Take Off	Ma Bong-gu's grandmother
2010	A Better Tomorrow	Aunt
2011	The Last Blossom	Grandmother
2011	Silenced	Kang In-ho's mother
2012	Unlawful Love (short film)	Ms. Lee
2013	Boomerang Family	Sang-geun's woman
2013	The Spy: Undercover Operation	Chul-soo's mother
2013	Marriage Blue	Dae-bok's mother (cameo)
2015	The Treacherous	Mother of Deposed Queen Lady Yun

=== Television series ===
Year	Title	Role
1989	Let's Go, Butterfly, to Cheongsan	
1990	Our Paradise	
1990	Impatiens Flower Standing Under the Fence	Kkeut-soon's mother
1992	Your Name Is Hyo-ja	
1994	Mudang	
1994	Farewell	
1994	Hidden Pictures	
1995	Seoul Nocturne	
1995	The Age of Uniqueness	Grandmother
1995	Even If the Wind Blows	
1996	The Sweet Life	Ms. Kang
1996	Reporting for Duty	Grandmother of army corps commander
1996	A Faraway Country	
1997	A Bluebird Has It	Andy Kim's mother
1998	The King's Path	Court lady Choi
1998	Eun-ah's Yard	
1998	Six Siblings	
1998	Sunflower	Jae-bong's mother
1999	House Above the Waves	So-ran's mother
1999	Someone's House	
2001	Well Known Woman	Park Man-gu's mother
2001	Four Sisters	Pyung Yang-daek
2001	Cool	
2001	Girls' High School Days	
2002	Rustic Period	Congresswoman Park Soon-cheon
2002	Album of Life	Mrs. Shim
2002	MBC Best Theater: "Hat Fraud Group's Lucky Day"	Ho-ja
2002	My Love Patzzi	
2002	Moon on Cheomseongdae	Madam Yoon
2002	Solitude	Kim Yi-soon
2003	Snowman	Han Pil-seung's mother
2003	Dog Bowl	Grandmother
2003	Maiden's Dream	
2003	Breathless	
2003	Long Live Love	
2004	MBC Best Theater: "Hi, Clementine"	Lee Sung-bok's mother
2004	Proposal	Housekeeper of Shim family
2004	Say You Love Me	Neung-ok
2004	Full House	Lee Young-jae's grandmother
2004	Toji, the Land	Mr. Kim's wife
2005	Love and Sympathy	Kang Hee-bun
2005	Pingguari	
2005	Eighteen, Twenty-Nine	Grandmother selling tteokbokki
2005	Green Rose	Park Soon-nyeo
2005	I Love You, My Enemy	Jang Hee-bun
2005	My Rosy Life	Miss Bong
2006	Seoul 1945	
2006	How Much Love?	Lee Sun-joo's aunt
2007	My Mom! Super Mom!	Gong Soon-nyeo
2007	Snow in August	Seon Gu-ja
2007	Golden Bride	Maeng Man-deok
2007	Drama City: "Aperture"	Yang Soon-nam
2007	Hometown Over the Hill	Yang San-daek
2007	In-soon Is Pretty	Park In-soon's grandmother
2008	The Great King, Sejong	Old woman with cow's ears
2008	Working Mom	Ahn Heung-boon
2008	My Life's Golden Age	Lee Hwang's grandmother
2008	Tazza	Young-min's aunt
2008	Worlds Within	Yoon Young's mother
2008	Star's Lover	Kim Ok-ja
2009	Glory of Youth	Kim Joo-hyung's grandmother
2009	Father, Your Place	Sung-nim
2010	Wish Upon a Star	Choi Eun-mal
2010	Golden Fish	Yook Gong-dol's grandmother
2010	Coffee House	Hong Bok-nyeo
2010	KBS Drama Special: "The Last Flashman"	Kkot-soon
2010	My Girlfriend Is a Gumiho	Samshin grandmother (cameo, episode 16)
2011	Midas	Woo Geum-ji
2011	Twinkle Twinkle	Go Eun-hye
2011	Romance Town	Noh Soon-geum's grandmother
2011	The Thorn Birds	
2011	Noriko Goes to Seoul	Sam-wol
2011	Dear My Sister	Choi Gan-nan
2012	Can't Live Without You	Kang Wol-ah
2012	KBS Drama Special: "My Wife's First Love"	Ye San-daek
2013	Flower of Revenge	Woman from Paju
2013	Pots of Gold	Choi Kwang-soon
2013	One Well-Raised Daughter	Byun Jong-soon
2014	Triangle	Oh Jung-hee's grandmother
2015	Angry Mom	Jo Kang-ja's mother-in-law
2015	Make a Woman Cry	Bok-rye
2016	Dear My Friends	
2016	Bring It On, Ghost	Kim In-rang's grandmother (cameo)

== Bibliography ==
Year	Title	Publisher	Notes/Ref.
2011	Superstar	Catholic Publishing House	Co-author

== Awards and nominations ==
Year	Award	Category	Nominated work	Result
1981	20th Grand Bell Awards	Special Award	Invited People	Won
2005	KBS Drama Awards	Best Supporting Actress	My Rosy Life	Won
2011	48th Grand Bell Awards	Best Supporting Actress	The Last Blossom	Nominated
