= Who Drives Me Crazy =

Who Makes Me Crazy
- Hangul: 누가 나를 미치게 하는가
- RR: Nuga nareul michige haneunga
- MR: Nuga narŭl mich'ige hanŭn'ga
- Directed by: Koo Im-seo
- Written by: Hyeon Nam-seop; Koo Im-seo
- Produced by: Park Chang-hun; Lee Yeong-su; Gwon Yeong-rak
- Starring: Lee Byung-hun; Choi Jin-sil
- Cinematography: Kim Yung-chul
- Edited by: Kim Hyeon
- Music by: Song Jae-il
- Release date: September 30, 1995
- Country: South Korea
- Language: Korean

Who Makes Me Crazy (Korean: 누가 나를 미치게 하는가) is a 1995 South Korean romantic comedy film starring Lee Byung-hun (in his film debut) and Choi Jin-sil.

== Plot ==
Lee Jong-du, a salesman who believes that luck will change when he becomes a famous writer. However he is forced to give up after his story failed to win at a spring literature contest. Added to this is the fear that his girlfriend Joo-young will leave him. After Joo-young gets a job Jong-du realizes his mistakes that knows that she will never leave him.

== Cast ==
- Lee Byung-hun as Lee Jong-du
- Choi Jin-sil as Kim Joo-young
- Choi Jong-won as Hwang Dal-soo
- Kim Il-woo
- Kwon Byung-gil
- Cho Seon-mook
- Choi Hak-rak
- Kim Ye-ryeong as Min Ji-hyun
- Cho Ju-mi
- Lim Dae-ho
