= Holiday in Seoul =

- Theatrical poster
- Hangul: 홀리데이 인 서울
- RR: Hollidei in Seoul
- MR: Hollidei in Sŏul
- Directed by: Kim Ui-seok
- Written by: Kang Woo-suk
- Produced by: Kang Woo-suk; Kim Mi-hee
- Starring: Choi Jin-sil; Kim Min-jong; Jang Dong-gun; Jin Hee-kyung; Lee Kyung-young
- Cinematography: Choi Jeong-won
- Edited by: Park Sun-duk
- Music by: Lee Tzsche
- Distributed by: Sanrio Film Pictures
- Release date: March 21, 1997 (South Korea)
- Running time: 98 minutes
- Country: South Korea
- Language: Korean

Holiday in Seoul (Korean: 홀리데이 인 서울) is a 1997 South Korean film directed by Kim Ui-seok and starring Choi Jin-sil. The film tells two stories of how four people intertwine in Seoul's urban jungle.

== Cast ==
- Choi Jin-sil as Telephonist
- Kim Min-jong as Bellboy
- Jang Dong-gun as Taxi Driver
- Jin Hee-kyung as Leg Model
- Lee Kyung-young as Telephone Seller
- Cha Seung-won as Pickpocket
- Dong Bang-woo as Chef
- Kim Il-woo as Taxi Company Owner
- Park Kwang-jung as Guy on a blind date
