= Oseam (1990 film) =

- Film poster
- Hangul: 오세암
- RR: Oseam
- MR: Oseam
- Directed by: Park Chul-soo
- Written by: Jeong Chae-bong
- Produced by: Lee Tae-won
- Starring: Kim Hye-soo; Shim Jae-rim; Seo Yeo-jin; Jo Sang-geon; Choi Jong-won
- Cinematography: Son Hyeon-chae
- Edited by: Kim Hyun
- Music by: Lee Jong-gu
- Production company: Taehung Pictures
- Release date: March 24, 1990
- Running time: 115 minutes
- Country: South Korea
- Language: Korean

Oseam (Korean: 오세암) is a 1990 South Korean drama film directed by Park Chul-soo. It tells the story of two orphans based on a legend in which a five-year-old boy sacrificed himself to open his blinded sister's eyes. The general theme deals with reconciliation between Buddhism and Catholicism.

== Cast ==
- Kim Hye-soo
- Shim Jae-rim
- Seo Yeo-jin
- Jo Sang-geon
- Choi Jong-won
- Kim Yong-rim
- Jo Hyeong-gi
- Nam Po-dong
- Song Ok-sook
- Chun Ho-jin

== See also ==
- Cinema of Korea
- Contemporary culture of South Korea
- List of Korean-language films
