= Choi Jong-won =

South Korean actor and politician (born 1950)

- Born: January 27, 1950 (age 76); Sangjang-myeon, Samcheok, South Korea
- Education: Seoul Drama School; Kyungwoon University - Journalism and Mass Communication
- Occupations: Actor; politician
- Agent: SP Entertainment
- Spouse: Jung Young-ae
- Children: 2 daughters

Korean name
- Hangul: 최종원
- Hanja: 崔鍾元
- RR: Choe Jongwon
- MR: Ch'oe Chongwŏn

Choi Jong-won (Korean: 최종원; born January 27, 1950) is a South Korean actor and politician. Choi began his acting career in theater, then made his screen debut in 1978 and became known as a veteran actor of stage, film and television of over forty years. He won Best Supporting Actor at the Grand Bell Awards in 1995 for the Joseon-era period drama The Eternal Empire.

Choi entered politics in 2004, when he ran and lost in the 17th National Assembly elections as an Uri Party candidate. He ran again in the by-elections on July 28, 2010, under the Democratic Party, where he won as the lawmaker representing Gangwon Province (Taebaek, Jeongseon, Yeongwol, and Pyeongchang) in the 18th National Assembly, succeeding Lee Kwang-jae who resigned to run for the Gangwon governorship. On September 16, 2010, Choi was elected as the head of DP's Gangwon provincial chapter.

== Filmography ==
=== Film ===
Year	Title	Role
1979	Grave Wood	
1979	The Third Han River Bridge	
1980	White Smile	
1982	Late Autumn	
1982	The Chrysanthemum and the Clown	
1984	The Woman Shot the Man	
1984	The Fear of Ancestral Rites	
1984	Sadness Even in the Sky	
1985	The Tiger Butterfly Is Lonely at Dusk	
1985	Madame Aema 3	
1989	Come Come Come Upward	Bi-gu
1989	Gagman	Taxi driver
1989	Shock Continues Long	
1990	Oseam	
1990	Mayumi	Choi Kang-il
1990	Ggok-Ji-Ddan	
1990	The Dream	Pyeong-mok
1990	My Love, My Bride	Pastor
1991	Stairways of Heaven	Detective agency employee
1991	Things that Sadden My Wife	Prosecutor
1991	Fly High Run Far	
1991	The Mulberry Field Traveler	
1992	Kim's War	Homeroom teacher
1992	The World Is Beautiful Enough to Live In	Choon-sik
1992	A Keeper of the Heart	
1993	First Love	Park Young-shin's father
1993	The Supreme Order	Lee Hwa-ryong
1993	Seopyeonje	Cheon-ga
1993	Two Cops	Tae-seong
1994	The Eternal Empire	Sim Hwan-ji
1994	The Man of 49 Days	Detective 1
1994	Rosy Life	Company president Han
1994	The Taebaek Mountains	
1994	How to Top My Wife	Hit man
1995	Bitter and Sweet	
1995	Gun and Gun	Kim Nun-seok
1995	The Hair Dresser	Rosen Lee
1995	Who Drives Me Crazy	Hwang Dal-soo
1995	Millions in My Account	
1996	Seven Reasons Why Beer Is Better Than a Lover	Video shop owner
1996	Karuna	Yang Cheon-soo
1996	1996 Mulberry	Sam-bo
1996	Love Story	Sung-woo's office story
1996	Jungle Story	Senior colleague
1996	The Adventures of Mrs. Park	(cameo)
1997	The Rocket Was Launched	
1997	The Audition	Director Jin
1997	Father	Mr. Park
1997	Hallelujah	
1997	Destiny	Director Choi
1998	The Happenings	Jang Deok-bae
2000	Pisces	Department head Choi
2001	Love Her	Owner
2001	Paradise Villa	Taxi driver
2005	Blood Rain	Royal emissary Choi
2005	Princess Aurora	Chief of detective squad
2006	Hanbando	Kim Hong-soon
2006	Traces of Love	Seo Min-joo's father
2008	Santamaria	Old man Mr. Shin
2008	Summer Whispers	Professor Noh
2010	Le Grand Chef 2: Kimchi Battle	Ja-woon
2011	The Client	Professor Ahn
2014	A Dynamite Family	Father

=== Television series ===
Year	Title	Role
1995	Jazz	Boss Kang
1996	Papa	Shin Shin-ho
1996	Reporting for Duty	Woo Myung-do
1996	When the Salmon Returns	Young-chae's father
1997	The Angel Within	
1998	Six Children	
1998	The King and the Queen	Han Myung-hoi
2000	Three Friends	
2000	Did You Ever Love?	
2001	Pretty Woman	Director Dokgo
2002	Sunlight Upon Me	
2002	Age of Innocence	Uncle
2003	Drama City: "The Barley Field"	Choi Young-dal
2003	She is Cool	
2006	Seoul 1945	Lee In-pyung
2006	Special of My Life	Baek-Gom-Pa boss
2006	Cloud Stairs	Doctor Byun
2007	Bong-jae Returns	Park Bong-jae
2007	Auction House	Heo Myung-hwan
2008	The Great King, Sejong	Ha Ryun
2008	Daughter-in-Law	Ma Pyung-moon
2009	The Quiet Village	Chief minister
2009	Hot Blood	Ha Ryu's father
2010	The Reputable Family	Choi Won-young
2014	Gunman in Joseon	Kim Jwa-young
2014	KBS Drama Special: "The Girl Who Became a Photo"	Min Sung-taek
2014	Healer	Park Jung-dae, the Elder
2015	Six Flying Dragons	Yi In-gyeom
2016	Monster	Jo Ki-ryang
2016	Sweet Stranger and Me	Chairman Kwon
2017	Untouchable	Goo Yong-chan
2018	Mr. Sunshine	Heungseon Daewongun
2020	Royal Secret Agent	Kang In-chung
2021	Lovers of the Red Sky	Ha Ram's grandfather (cameo)

== Theater ==
Year	Title	Role
	The Little Prince	
	The Collector	
	The Merchant of Venice	
	Equus	
	Hamlet	
	King Lear	Lear
	Head of Dried Walleye Pollack	
	A Dwarf Launches a Little Ball	
	A Streetcar Named Desire	
	Death of a Salesman	
	You Can See Apgujeong-dong from Oksu-dong	
	Oliver!	
	The Unfilial Son Is Weeping	
	99 품바	
	Beautiful Street	
1980	Father's Sea	
1983	Who's Afraid of Virginia Woolf?	George
1985	Annie	
1992	Marvelous Guys	
2000	Guys and Dolls	
2000	The Beautiful Distance	
2002	Years of a Mother's Love	
2009	American Buffalo	Don
2012	The Watch (Heavenly Clock)	King Sejong
2013	Marriage	Butler
2013	It Was a Little Darkness in the Hole of a Wooden Gong	Mang-ryeong

== Awards and nominations ==
Year	Award	Category	Nominated work	Result
1980	Korea Theater Festival	Best Actor	Father's Sea	Won
1983	20th Dong-A Theatre Awards	Best Actor	Who's Afraid of Virginia Woolf?	Won
1985	Producers' Group Acting Awards	Most Entertaining in Theater	Annie	Won
1989	13th Seoul Theater Festival	Best Actor		Won
1991	Love Theater Festival	Best Actor		Won
1995	33rd Grand Bell Awards	Best Supporting Actor	The Eternal Empire	Won
1995	16th Blue Dragon Film Awards	Best Supporting Actor	How to Top My Wife	Nominated
1999	KBS Drama Awards	Best Supporting Actor	The King and the Queen	Won
2015	SBS Drama Awards	Excellence Award, Actor in a Serial Drama	Six Flying Dragons	Nominated

== Election results ==
Year	Elections	Constituency	Political party	Votes (%)	Results
2004	17th National Assembly General Election	Proportional representation (35th)	Uri	8,145,814 (38.26%)	Not Elected
2010	2010 By-election	Taebaek–Yeongwol–Pyeongchang–Jeongseon (Gangwon)	Democratic	32,661 (55.01%)	Won
