= Lee Myung-se =

South Korean filmmaker (born 1957)

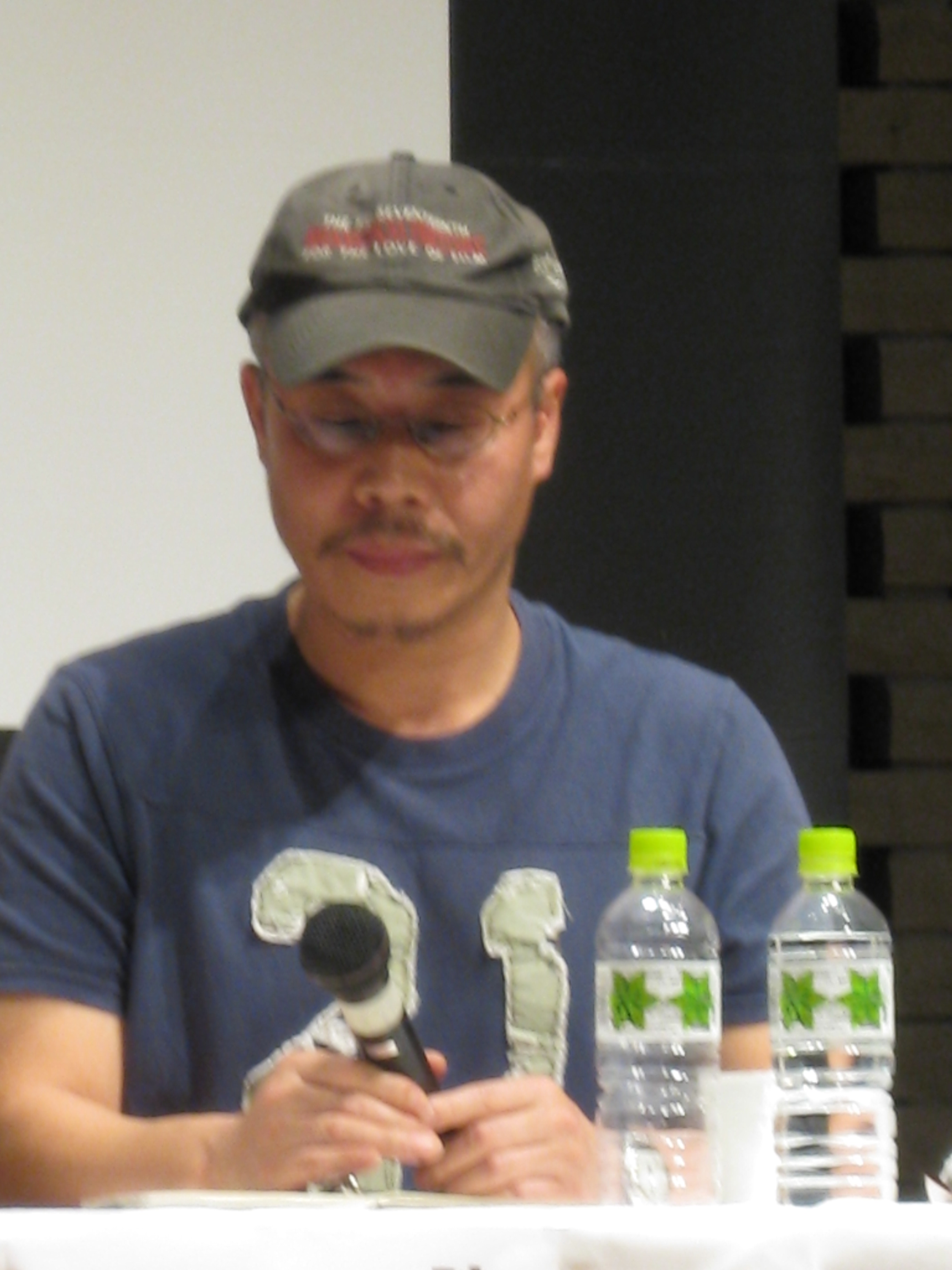
- Born: August 20, 1957 (age 69); Baekmajang, South Korea
- Occupations: Film director, screenwriter

Lee Myung-se (Korean: 이명세; born August 20, 1957) is a South Korean filmmaker.

Lee began his career as an assistant producer under Bae Chang-ho for the films Hwang Jin-I (1986), Our Sweet Days of Youth (1988), and Dream (1990). At the 1991 Asia-Pacific Film Festival, he was awarded Best New Director for the film, Naui Sarang Naui Shinbu, and in 1993 won the Special Jury Award for Cheot Sarang.

Other film credits include Nowhere to Hide (1999) and Duelist (2005).

== Filmography ==
- Gagman (1989) - writer and director
- The Dream (Ggum; 1990) - writer
- My Love, My Bride (Naui sarang naui sinbu; 1990) - writer and director
- First Love (Cheot sarang; 1993) - writer and director
- Bitter and Sweet (Namjaui goerowe; 1995) - writer and director
- Their Last Love Affair (Jidokhan sarang; 1996) - writer and director
- Nowhere to Hide (Injeong sajeong bol geot eobtda; 1999) - writer and director
- Duelist (Hyeongsa; 2005) - writer, director and Producer
- M (2007) - writer, director and Producer The film premiered at the Toronto International Film Festival,

== Awards and nominations ==
Year presented, name of the award ceremony, category, nominated work, and the result of the nomination
Year	Award	Category	Nominated Work	Result	Ref.
1990	12th Blue Dragon Film Awards	Best New Director	My Love, My Bride	Won	
1990	29th Grand Bell Awards	Best New Director	My Love, My Bride	Won	
1990	36th Asian Pacific Film Festival	Best New Director	My Love, My Bride	Won	
1990	2nd Chunsa Film Festival	New Director Award	My Love, My Bride	Won	
1990	11th Korean Film Critics Association Awards	Best Screenplay	My Love, My Bride	Won	
1993	1993 38th Asia Pacific Film Festival	Special Jury Award	First Love	Won	
1993	1993 14th Blue Dragon Film Awards	Best Screenplay	First Love	Won	
1999	1999 20th Blue Dragon Film Awards	Best Picture	Nowhere to Hide	Won	
2000	2nd Deauville Asian Film Festival	Best Director	Nowhere to Hide	Won	
2000	2000 2nd Deauville Asian Film Festival	Grand Prize	Nowhere to Hide	Won	
2000	14th Fukuoka Asian Film Festival	Grand Prix	Nowhere to Hide	Won	
2005	25th Korean Film Critics Association Awards	Best Picture	Duelist	Won	
2005	25th Korean Film Critics Association Awards	Best Director	Duelist	Won	
2005	25th Korean Film Critics Association Awards	Top 10 Film	Duelist	Won	
2006	42nd Baeksang Arts Awards	Film Best Director	Duelist	Won	
2006	42nd Baeksang Arts Awards	Best Film	Duelist	Nominated	
2007	27th Korean Association of Film Critics Award for	Best Director	M	Won	
2008	9th Busan Film Critics Association Award	Best Director	M	Won	

=== Honours ===
- Jury member at the 2024 Busan International Film Festival for its main competition section 'New Currents Award'.
