= Cho Sung-min =

South Korean baseball player (1973–2013)

- Born: April 5, 1973; Seoul, South Korea
- Died: January 6, 2013 (aged 39); Seoul, South Korea
- Cause of death: Suicide by hanging
- Spouses: Choi Jin-sil (m. 2000; div. 2004) Shim Mi Young (m. 2007; sep. 2010)
- Children: 2
Cho Sung-min
- Pitcher
- Batted: Right Threw: Right
Professional debut
- NPB: 1997, for the Yomiuri Giants
- KBO: 2005, for the Hanwha Eagles
Last appearance
- NPB: 2002, for the Yomiuri Giants
- KBO: 2007, for the Hanwha Eagles
NPB statistics
- Wins-losses: 11-10
- ERA: 2.84
- Strikeouts: 127
KBO statistics
- Wins-losses: 3-4
- ERA: 5.09
- Strikeouts: 30
- Stats at Baseball Reference
Teams
- Yomiuri Giants (1997–1998, 2000, 2002); Hanwha Eagles (2005–2007)

Korean name
- Hangul: 조성민
- Hanja: 趙成珉
- RR: Jo Seongmin
- MR: Cho Sŏngmin

Cho Sung-min (Korean: 조성민; April 5, 1973 – January 6, 2013) was a South Korean professional baseball player with the Yomiuri Giants of Japan and the Hanwha Eagles of the KBO League. He also received media attention for his much-publicized marriage and divorce from actress Choi Jin-sil.

== Career ==
Cho Sung-min dominated the baseball amateur league in the 1990s, and with his attractive looks and top-class pitching skills, he had many female fans in Korea and Japan. He pitched for the South Korea national baseball team in the 1994 Asian Games, when South Korea finished with a silver medal.

Cho joined Japan's Yomiuri Giants in 1996, and his best years as a pro-baseball player were 1997-1998 when he was named an All-Star pitcher for the Central League after racking up a record of seven wins, six losses and a 2.75 ERA in the first half of the 1998 season.

But after peaking his career soon went downhill, with a prolonged slump due to ankle and elbow injuries. He left the Yomiuri Giants in 2002.

He returned to the Korean baseball league in 2005 to play for the Hanwha Eagles until October 2007, but instead of making an impressive comeback, he had to leave the team in 2007 with a disappointing performance.

He briefly worked as a TV commentator, before joining the Doosan Bears in 2011 as a coach of one of their minor league teams. He refused to extend his contract with the club in November 2012 when his term ended.

Cho also tried his hand at various businesses including an unsuccessful bakery chain, and invested heavily into a baseball management company he had set up in 2008.

== Marriage and divorce ==
Cho's personal life was as turbulent as his career. He first met actress Choi Jin-sil on the set of a television show in 1998. At the time, Cho was a promising player and one of the league's all-star team members, while Choi had starred in dozens of films and television dramas in the 1980s and 90s and was dubbed the "nation's actress."

Cho and Choi married in a lavish wedding ceremony in 2000. A few years later, however, the couple grabbed headlines in Korea when they accused each other of being "unfaithful" and they divorced in August 2004 after Cho was arrested for beating his wife.

The ex-baseball star remarried in 2007 but was apparently separated since 2010.

After Choi Jin-sil committed suicide by hanging in October 2008, Cho was embroiled in a dispute with her bereaved family as he sought custody of his son Hwan-hee and daughter Jun-hee. Choi Jin-sil's younger brother, the singer Choi Jin-young, deemed Cho's move as a step to take over his late wife's wealth that her children were to inherit. The case was settled as Cho gave up his rights over her property, and the children were left in the legal custody of their maternal grandmother.

Choi's death resulted in a number of copycat suicides among Koreans, including celebrities. A year and a half later, Choi Jin-young also killed himself in March 2010.

In November 2012, Cho had a scuffle with strangers at a pub and underwent police questioning.

== Death and impact ==
On January 6, 2013, Cho's body was discovered by his girlfriend, hanged in the bathroom of her apartment in Dogok-dong, southern Seoul, at around 5:26 a.m. According to investigators from the Suseo Police Station, on the night before his death, Cho drank three bottles of soju with his 40-year-old girlfriend, identified only by her surname Park, during which she told him she wanted to end their relationship. Park then left her house at around midnight to meet a friend, and returned at 3:40 a.m. only to find Cho hanging from the bathroom shower using his belt. Cho hinted at suicide in a text message he sent to his mother at around 12:11 a.m. and in the message he sent to his girlfriend five minutes later over the mobile messenger service KakaoTalk. In the message to his mother, he wrote, "It looks like there is no way for me to live in Korea anymore. I am very sorry, but please think that you never had a son." To Park, he left the words, "My heart breaks that we can't be together in the final moments of my life. Thank you for everything. Hang tough even after I am gone." No will was found at the scene.

Sung-min's suicide would also be a Copycat suicide of Choi Jin-sil.

For his funeral wake, Cho's family set up a memorial altar at Korea University Anam Hospital. His body was cremated on January 8, 2013, and the remains were buried at the Skycastle Memorial Park in Bundang, Gyeonggi-do.
