= Susanne Brink's Arirang =

- Theatrical poster
- Hangul: 수잔브링크의 아리랑
- RR: Sujan Beuringkeuui Arirang
- MR: Sujan Pŭringk'ŭŭi Arirang
- Directed by: Jang Gil-su
- Written by: Yu U-jae; Jang Gil-su
- Produced by: Kim Kae-sung
- Starring: Choi Jin-sil
- Cinematography: Son Hyeon-chae
- Edited by: Kim Hee-su
- Music by: Shin Byung-ha
- Release date: September 21, 1991
- Countries: South Korea; Sweden
- Languages: Korean; Swedish

Susanne Brink's Arirang (Korean: 수잔브링크의 아리랑) is a 1991 South Korean/Swedish film based upon the life and experiences of Susanne Brink, an adult Korean adoptee from Sweden who suffered abuse and racism in her adoptive home and country. The real Susanne Brink died of cancer in January 2009 at the age of 45; she was interred in her hometown of Norrköping.

== Cast ==
- Choi Jin-sil as Susanne
- Åsa Älmeby as Nurse
- Kim Yun-kyeong
- Malin Berghagen as Ulrika
- Pierre Boutros as Christer
- Lars Green as Rune
- Pia Green as Inger
- Brian Tuleus/Modin as Håkan
- Jeon Suk
- Helena Lindblom
- Park Yong-soo
- Niclas Wahlgren as Willy
- Mona Seilitz as Birgitta
- Kim Ji-young
