= How to Top My Wife =

- Film poster
- Directed by: Kang Woo-suk
- Written by: Kim Sang-jin; Oh Shi-wook
- Produced by: Kang Woo-suk; Kim Se-chang; Kim Mi-hee
- Starring: Park Joong-hoon; Choi Jin-sil
- Cinematography: Jeong Gwang-seok
- Edited by: Kim Hyeon
- Music by: Choi Kyung-sik
- Production companies: Morning Calm Entertainment Group Inc. CJ Entertainment
- Distributed by: Cinema Service
- Release date: December 17, 1994
- Running time: 101 minutes
- Country: South Korea
- Language: Korean

How to Top My Wife (Korean: 마누라 죽이기; RR: Manura jugigi) is a 1994 South Korean comedy film directed by Kang Woo-suk, starring Park Joong-hoon and Choi Jin-sil.

== Plot ==
Park Bong-soo, the head of a film production company, falls in love and marries one of his employees, Jang So-young. They begin fighting constantly about how to manage the business, and Bong-soo embarks on an affair with Kim Hye-ri, an actress in one of the movies he's producing. When Hye-ri pressures him to leave his wife, Bong-soo finds it difficult to bring up the subject of divorce, so instead, he hires a hit man to kill So-young.

== Cast ==
- Park Joong-hoon as Park Bong-soo
- Choi Jin-sil as Jang So-young
- Uhm Jung-hwa as Kim Hye-ri
- Choi Jong-won as Hit man
- Jo Hyeong-ki as Director
- Kwon Yong-woon as Deserter
- Yang Taek-jo as Battalion commander
- Jo Seon-mook as Young-cheol
- Kim Sung-kyum as Bong-soo's father
- Kim Seok-ok as Bong-soo's mother
- Bae Jang-su as Director Eom
- Lee Sook as Young-cheol's wife
- Kim Ui-sang as Jun-seok
- Gu Bon-im as Kyeong-ok
- Kang Sung-jin as "Big"
- Kim Joo-hee as Miss Ahn
- Lee Ki-young as Doctor
