= Star in My Heart =

- Also known as: Wish Upon a Star
- Created by: MBC Production
- Written by: Kim Ki-ho
- Directed by: Lee Jin-suk; Lee Chang-hoon
- Starring: Choi Jin-sil; Cha In-pyo; Ahn Jae-wook; Jeon Do-yeon
- Country of origin: South Korea
- Original language: Korean
- No. of episodes: 16

Original release
- Network: Munhwa Broadcasting Corporation
- Release: 10 March – 29 April 1997

Star in My Heart (Korean: 별은 내 가슴에; RR: Byeoreun nae gaseume) was a 1997 Korean drama series run on MBC. One of the earlier Korean dramas to air outside Korea, as part of what became known as the Korean Wave, it was very popular and helped its cast (particularly Ahn Jae-wook) become widely recognized. Choi Jin-sil broke her exclusive contract with SBS upon accepting the lead role which ultimately resulted in MBC paying a penalty for her appearance. The drama also marked Jeon Do-yeon's final small screen appearance prior to transition in the big screen with The Contact later that year.

== Story ==
Orphan Lee Yun-hee (Choi Jin-sil) is adopted into a hostile family environment. She harbors an undiscovered artistic talent, which helps to catapult her into the lives of two men. She was taken to her father's friend family, after her father died, although while his father's friend had warm feeling towards her she was met with hostility from her new stepmother (Park Won-sook) and her stepsister Ahn Yi-hwa (Jo Mi-ryung), who throughout the series are intriguing with against her. She becomes engaged in a relationship with a young, promising star Kang Min-hee (Ahn Jae-wook) a son of a rich businessman who's against his only son being a singer because it doesn't uphold to his values of a good occupation a man should be busy with. Lee Joon-hee (Cha In-pyo), who's a lead designer in one of the fashion houses, becomes a friend of Yun-hee and eventually helps her to make a career as a designer as well.

== Cast ==
- Choi Jin-sil as Lee Yun-hee
- Cha In-pyo as Lee Joon-hee
- Ahn Jae-wook as Kang Min-hee
- Jeon Do-yeon as Soon-ae
- Jo Mi-ryung as Ahn Yi-hwa
- Park Won-sook as Mrs. Song
- Lee Young-hoo as Mr. Ahn
- Park Chul as Ahn Yi-ban
- Oh Ji-myung as Min-hee's father
- Sunwoo Yong-nyeo as Min-hee's mother
- Maeng Sang-hoon as Heo Kwang-young
- Kang Nam-gil as Han Jae-bong
- Yoo Tae-woong as Joon-young
- Han Seung-yeon as orphan

== See also ==
- List of Korean television shows
- Contemporary culture of South Korea
