= Kim Il-woo (actor, born 1953) =

South Korean actor (1953–2004)

- Born: May 24, 1953; Seoul, South Korea
- Died: June 13, 2004 (aged 49); Seoul, South Korea
- Education: Seoul Institute of the Arts
- Occupation: Actor
- Years active: 1976–2004
- Spouse: Lee Yong-yi
- Children: 2

Korean name
- Hangul: 김일우
- Hanja: 金日宇
- RR: Gim Ilu
- MR: Kim Iru

Kim Il-woo (born May 24, 1953 – June 13, 2004) was a South Korean actor. A veteran actor, Kim died of gastric cancer at the age of 49 on June 13, 2004.

== Filmography ==
(Note: List is incomplete)

=== Films ===
Year	Title	Role
1988	Lee Jang-ho's Alien Baseball Team 2	
1993	Two Cops	Detective Lee
1993	To the Starry Island	
1994	The Eternal Empire	
1995	Who Drives Me Crazy	
1996	Seven Reasons Why Beer Is Better Than a Lover	
1996	Farewell My Darling	
1996	Two Cops 2	
1996	The Adventure of Mrs. Park	
1996	Erotic X	
1997	Lament	
1997	Holiday in Seoul	
1997	Barricade	
1997	Push! Push!	
1997	Baby Sale	
1997	Hallelujah	
1997	Blackjack	
1997	Sky Doctor	
1997	Destiny	
1998	Two Cops 3	
1998	Extra	
1998	Paradise Lost	
1999	The Harmonium in My Memory	
1999	A Growing Business	
1999	Inner Circle	
2000	If	
2000	Striker	
2000	Bongja	
2001	Club Butterfly	
2001	Prison World Cup	
2001	My Sassy Girl	
2001	Volcano High	
2002	Make It Big	
2003	Mr. Butterfly	
2004	Mokpo, Gangster's Paradise	
2004	Love, So Divine	
2005	The Crescent Moon	

=== Television series ===
Year	Title	Role
2003	Bodyguard	
2004	Sunlight Pours Down	

== Awards and nominations ==
Year	Award	Category	Nominated work	Result	Ref.
1996	34th Grand Bell Awards	Best Supporting Actor	Farewell My Darling	Won	
2004	42nd Film Day commemoration ceremony hosted by the Korean Film Association	Commendation for meritorious films (Director)		Won	
