= Ghost Mamma =

- Hangul: 고스트 맘마
- RR: Goseuteu mamma
- MR: Kosŭt'ŭ mamma
- Directed by: Han Ji-seung
- Written by: Yeo Hye-Young; Han Ji-Seung
- Produced by: Park Yong-bin
- Starring: Choi Jin-sil; Kim Seung-woo
- Cinematography: Chung Kwang-suk
- Edited by: Kim Hyeon
- Music by: Ahn Ji-hong
- Distributed by: Hwang Ki-seong Productions
- Release date: December 21, 1996
- Running time: 105 minutes
- Country: South Korea
- Language: Korean

Ghost Mamma (Korean: 고스트 맘마) is a 1996 South Korean romance fantasy film.

== Plot ==
The film tells the story of a happily married couple, Ji-seok and In-ju, who lived with their son Dabin until a tragic accident which left Dabin alive but caused In-ju's death one year later. Ji-seok tries to commit suicide but In-ju visits him as a ghost to comfort him.

== Cast ==
- Choi Jin-sil ... In-ju
- Kim Seung-woo ... Ji-seok
- Park Sang-ah
- Kwon Hae-hyo ... Byun Joo-ho
- Jeon Soo-kyung
- Lee Taek-geun
- Park Ji-seong
- Jung Hye-sun
- Jo Sang-gun
- Ryu Tae-ho
