= The Letter (1997 film) =

- Theatrical poster
- Hangul: 편지
- Hanja: 片紙; 便紙
- RR: Pyeonji
- MR: P'yŏnji
- Directed by: Lee Jung-gook
- Written by: Lee Jung-gook; Kim Moo-ryoung; Cho Hwan-yoo
- Produced by: Kim Jin-mun
- Starring: Choi Jin-sil; Park Shin-yang
- Cinematography: Park Gyeong-won
- Edited by: Park Soon-duk
- Music by: Kang Min
- Production company: Art Cinema
- Release date: 22 November 1997
- Running time: 105 minutes
- Country: South Korea
- Language: Korean

The Letter (Korean: 편지) is a 1997 South Korean romance film starring Choi Jin-sil and Park Shin-yang.

== Story ==
A happily married couple see only good days ahead of them; but the husband discovers that he is dying of cancer. Heartbroken at the possibility of leaving his wife behind, he proceeds to write love letters aimed at consoling his wife.

== Cast ==
- Choi Jin-sil as Jung-in
- Park Shin-yang as Hwan-yoo
- Choi Yong-min
- Lee Jun-seop
- Song Gwang-su
- Nam Sang-mi
- Park Jong-cheol
- Lee Sang-u
- Kim Young-dae
- Lee In-ock

== Release ==
The Letter was released in South Korea on 22 November 1997, and received a total of 724,474 admissions to make it the best selling domestic production and fourth film overall of that year. Together with The Contact it was only one of two films since 1993 to break the 600,000 admissions mark.

== Remake ==
- The Letter ("เดอะ เลตเตอร์ จดหมายรัก"), a 2004 Thai remake starring Anne Thongprasom and Attaporn Teemakorn.
