= Cha In-pyo =

South Korean actor (born 1967)

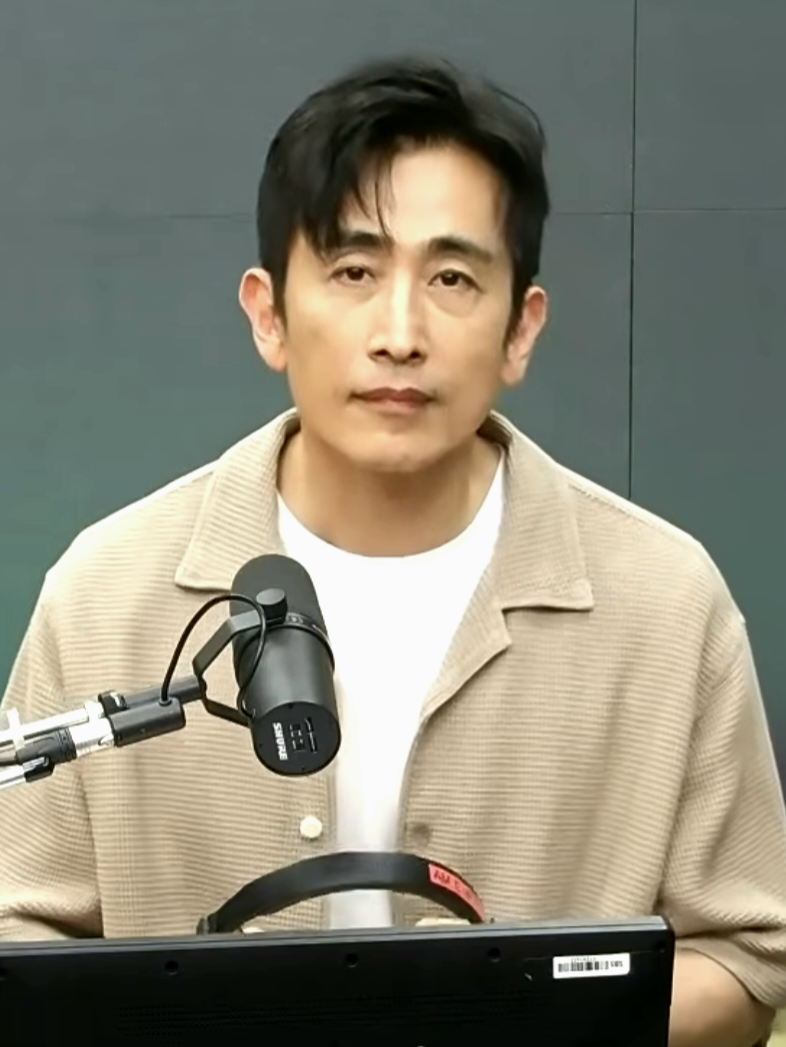
- Cha in May 2026
- Born: October 14, 1967 (age 59); Seoul, South Korea
- Education: Rutgers University
- Occupations: Actor; novelist
- Years active: 1987–present
- Spouse: Shin Ae-ra (m. 1995)
- Children: 3

Korean name
- Hangul: 차인표
- Hanja: 車仁杓
- RR: Cha Inpyo
- MR: Ch'a Inp'yo

Cha In-pyo (Korean: 차인표; born October 14, 1967) is a South Korean actor and director.

== Early life ==
Cha graduated from Rutgers University in the U.S. with a degree in economics. His father ran a shipping company and had intended for Cha to take over the family business.

== Career ==
Cha had dreamed of becoming an actor since he was a teenager, so he auditioned for General's Son, but at the recommendation of his parents, he went to the U.S. with his mother to study. After working at Hanjin Shipping for several years, he quit his job to pursue acting full-time. In 1993 he joined MBC and made his debut in the television series Under the Same Roof before enlisting and completing his mandatory military service. His major breakthrough came in the 1997 television series Star in My Heart, one of the first Korean dramas to be broadcast overseas and widely acknowledged to be the "first generation" of the Korean Wave, earning him public recognition. In 2004 he starred in the SBS romantic-mystery drama Hong Kong Express. While the drama did not garner as much attention, the scene in which his character expresses his rage by furiously brushing his teeth in front of the bathroom mirror became iconic and was often parodied by comedians or used as a meme on Korean variety shows to indicate silent rage. Cha later stated on Cultwo Show that the scene was not in his script since the only direction he received was "expressing anger in the bathroom".

Cha has since garnered an extensive filmography in both film and television, including Crossing which was South Korea's entry for the 81st Academy Awards for Best Foreign Language Film and earned him several nominations for various awards. He has also collaborated with Korean-American director Benson Lee in the period drama-comedy indie film Seoul Searching, which was screened at the 2015 Sundance Film Festival and features a diverse cast and crew drawn from the worldwide overseas Japanese, Chinese and Korean diaspora. He returned to network television in the weekend drama The Gentlemen of Wolgyesu Tailor Shop, which drew ratings of over 30% for much of its run and earned him nominations at the 2016 KBS Drama Awards.

== Personal life ==
Cha met his future wife, co-star Shin Ae-ra, on the set of the drama Love in Your Heart and they married in March 1995 prior to his enlistment. As two of the top television stars of the 1990s, their marriage received extensive media coverage and was one of the most reported events of the year. They have a son and two daughters. Their decision to adopt their daughters was met with praise, especially given the rarity of adoptions by local Korean families compared to overseas families.

== Philanthropy ==
On July 22, 2022, Cha donated 10 million won to treat a baby with stage 3 cancer from Uzbekistan through All That Medi.

In December 2022, Cha donated 50 million won to Yana (You Are Not Alone), a support group for young people preparing for self-reliance.

== Filmography ==
=== Film ===
Year	Title	Role	Notes/Ref.
2023	Honey Sweet	Seok-ho	
2021	What Happened to Mr. Cha?	Himself (Fictionalized)	Netflix January 1
2019	Heaven's Quest		
2015	Seoul Searching	Mr. Kim	
2014	My Boy	Do Gong	
2013	The Flu	South Korean President	
2012	The Tower	President Jo	
2009	A Dream Comes True	Im Sang_hyeon	Telecinema
2008	Crossing	Kim Yong-su	
2006	Hanbando	Yi Sang-hyeon	
2004	Mokpo the Harbor	Baek Seong-gi	
2003	Season in the Sun	Kim Sin-bu	
2002	Iron Palm	Ah Yi-eon	
1999	Dr. K	Kang Ji-min/Dr. K	
1998	Zzang	Hwang Gi-pung	
1996	Albatross	Lieutenant Jo Gyeong-min	Cho Chang-ho

=== Television series ===
Year	Title	Role	Notes/Ref.
TBA	People of the Blue House	Go Han-pyo	Sitcom
2016	The Gentlemen of Wolgyesu Tailor Shop	Bae Sam-do	
2015	D-Day	Minister Koo Ja-hyuk	
2014	Endless Love	General Chun Tae-Woong	
2012	Sent From Heaven	Cha Se-joo	
2011	Gyebaek	Moo Jin	Cameo
2010	Big Thing	Kang Tae-san	
2010	The Reputable Family	Choi Gook-sun	
2007	White Tower	Noh Min-guk	
2007	Love in Moments Apart	Zhao Ming Wei	Chinese drama
2005	Hong Kong Express	Choi Kang-hyuk	
2004	The Age of Heroes	Chun Tae-sun	
2004	Endless Love	Ji Dong-yang	Chinese drama
2004	The Four Detective Guards	Tie Shou (Iron Hand)	Chinese drama
2003	Perfect Love	Park Shi-woo	
2001	Her House	Jang Tae-ju	
2000	The Golden Era	Park Kwang-chul	
2000	Fireworks	Choi Jong-hyuk	
1999	Beautiful Seoul	Cho Sang-chul	
1999	The Boss	Kim Choon-sam	
1997	You and I	Park Young-kyu	
1997	Star in My Heart	Lee Joon-hee	
1997	Heroic Rebellion	Han Young-ung	
1996	Reporting for Duty	Cha Sung-yun	
1995	Making Men	Park Han-joo	
1994	Kareiski	Yoon Ho-jun	
1994	My Son's Woman	Kang Min-wook	
1994	Love is in Your Embrace	Kang Pung-ho	
1994	The White Journey		
1993	Han Ji-bong's Three Families		

=== Web series ===
Year	Title	Role	Notes	Ref.
2015	Sense8	Sun's Attorney	Season 1	

=== Web shows ===
Year	Title	Role	Notes	Ref.
2022	Saturday Night Live Korea	Host	Season 2 – Episode 2	

== MC ==
- Green Father (2023) - Cast Member
- 59th Grand Bell Awards (2023) - with Jang Do-yeon
- Jongno Photo Studio (2022) - Host; Chuseok's special
- Bistro Shigor (2021) - head chef
- Fireman Boy (Cast Member, 2021)
- Environmental Special (Korean: 환경 스페셜) (007)
- Blackbox (KBS, 2002)
- Love for Three Days (Korean: 3일간의 사랑; co-host, Park Cheol) (iTV, 1998)

== Music video appearances ==
- "Forgiveness" (용서, Cho Jang-hyuk, 2001)
- "Sad..." (Cho Jang-hyuk, 2001)
- "Forever" (영원, Sky, 1999)

== Discography ==
- "Heart Fire" (心火, Xin Huo) - The Four Detective Guards opening theme song (2004)
- "Dream" (梦, Meng) - The Four Detective Guards ending theme song (2004)

== Novels ==
- Cha, In-pyo. (2011). Today's Forecast (Korean: 오늘예보). Hainaim (해냄출판사). ISBN 978-89-6574-313-2.
- Cha, In-pyo. (2009). Goodbye, Hill (Korean: 잘 가요 언덕). Sallim (살림). ISBN 978-89-522-1103-3.

== Awards ==
Year	Ceremony	Film / Series	Award	Result	Ref.
2025	14th Hwang Sun-won literature Awards	—N/a	Rising Writer Award	Won	
2023	SBS Entertainment Awards	Green Fathers' Association - Husbands Next Door	Eco-brity Award	Won	
2018	MBC Entertainment Awards	Curious Husband's Get Away	Top Excellence Award in a Variety	Won	
2017	7th Beautiful Art Awards (Shin Young-kyun Arts and Culture Foundation)	—N/a	Beautiful Art Award	Won	
2017	10th Korea Drama Awards	The Gentlemen of Wolgyesu Tailor Shop	Grand Prize (Daesang)	Nominated	
2016	KBS Drama Awards	The Gentlemen of Wolgyesu Tailor Shop	Top Excellence Award, Actor	Nominated	
2016	KBS Drama Awards	The Gentlemen of Wolgyesu Tailor Shop	Excellence Award, Actor in a Serial Drama	Nominated	
2016	KBS Drama Awards	The Gentlemen of Wolgyesu Tailor Shop	Best Couple Award with Ra Mi-ran	Won	
2014	SBS Drama Awards	Endless Love	Special Award, Actor in Serial Drama	Nominated	
2013	3rd Busan International Commercial Awards	—N/a	International Honor Award (Domestic)	Won	
2010	SBS Drama Awards	Big Thing	Producer's Award	Won	
2010	SBS Drama Awards	Big Thing	Excellence Award, Actor in a Drama Special	Nominated	
2010	KBS Drama Awards	The Reputable Family	Excellence Award, Actor in Special Project and Serial Drama	Nominated	
2010	Corporate Social Responsibility Korea Awards	—N/a	Ministry of Health and Welfare Commendation, Private Sector	Won	
2010	Pony Chung Scholarship Foundation	—N/a	Pony Chung Innovation Award	Won	
2009	Korea CEO Summit	—N/a	KCS Volunteer Service Award	Won	
2008	Asan Foundation	—N/a	Asan Special Award	Won	
2008	16th Chunsa Film Art Awards	Crossing	Special Jury Prize	Won	
2006	Korean Presidential Awards	—N/a	Presidential Commendation for the Promotion and Protection of Children's Rights	Won	
2006	Model Awards	—N/a	Hallyu Star Award	Won	
2005	Korea Green Foundation	—N/a	100 People Who Light Up Our World	Won	
2004	MBC Drama Awards	The Age of Heroes	Top Excellence Award, Actor	Nominated	
2003	SBS Drama Awards	Perfect Love	Top Excellence Award, Actor	Won	
2003	SBS Drama Awards	Perfect Love	Top 10 Stars	Won	
2002	14th Korea Broadcasting Producer Awards	Her House	Best Actor	Won	
2001	MBC Drama Awards	Her House	Grand Prize (Daesang)	Won	
2001	MBC Drama Awards	Her House	Top Excellence Award, Actor	Won	
2001	37th Baeksang Arts Awards	Fireworks	Best Actor – Television	Nominated	
2000	SBS Drama Awards	Fireworks	Top Excellence Award, Actor	Nominated	
2000	36th Baeksang Arts Awards	The Boss	Best Actor – Television	Won	
1999	MBC Drama Awards	The Boss	Excellence Award, Actor	Won	
1999	MBC Drama Awards	The Boss	TV Actor of the Year (Netizens)	Nominated	
1998	34th Baeksang Arts Awards	You and I	Most Popularity Award, Actor – Television	Won	
1997	MBC Drama Awards	Star in My Heart, You and I, Heroic Rebellion	Excellence Award, Actor	Won	
1996	KBS Drama Awards	Reporting for Duty	Special Award	Won	
1995	31st Baeksang Arts Awards	Love is in Your Embrace	Best New Actor – Television	Nominated	
1995	31st Baeksang Arts Awards	Love is in Your Embrace	Most Popularity Award, Actor – Television	Won	
1994	MBC Drama Awards	Love is in Your Embrace	Best New Actor	Won	
1994	TV Journal Star of the Year Awards	Love is in Your Embrace	Grand Prize (Daesang)	Won	
1994	TV Journal Star of the Year Awards	Love is in Your Embrace	Top Excellence Award, Actor in a Drama	Won	
