= My Love, My Bride (1990 film) =

- Theatrical release poster
- Hangul: 나의 사랑, 나의 신부
- Hanja: 나의 사랑, 나의 新婦
- RR: Naui sarang, naui sinbu
- MR: Naŭi sarang, naŭi sinbu
- Directed by: Lee Myung-se
- Written by: Lee Myung-se
- Produced by: Park Hyo-sung
- Starring: Park Joong-hoon; Choi Jin-sil
- Cinematography: You Young-gill
- Edited by: Kim Hyeon
- Music by: Jeong Sung-jo
- Distributed by: Show East
- Release date: December 29, 1990 (South Korea)
- Running time: 111 minutes
- Country: South Korea
- Language: Korean

My Love, My Bride (Korean: 나의 사랑) is a 1990 South Korean romantic comedy film directed by Lee Myung-se. Choi Jin-sil won Best New Actress from the Grand Bell Awards for her role.

== Plot ==
Young-min works for a publishing company after graduating from college, dreaming of becoming a writer some day. He marries his college sweetheart, Mi-young, believing their love will last forever.

== Cast ==
- Park Joong-hoon - Kim Young-min
- Choi Jin-sil - Oh Mi-young
- Kim Bo-yeon - Miss Choi
- Jeon Moo-song - Editor-in-chief
- Song Young-chang
- Choi Jong-won - Pastor

== Remake ==
The 2014 remake starred Shin Min-ah and Jo Jung-suk.

== See also ==
- List of Korean-language films
- Korean cinema
