= Choi Jin-young =

South Korean actor and singer (1970–2010)

- Born: November 17, 1970; Seoul, South Korea
- Died: March 29, 2010 (aged 39); Seoul, South Korea
- Cause of death: Suicide by hanging
- Other name: Sky
- Education: Kyungwon College – Creative Writing (dropout); Hanyang University – Theatre
- Occupations: Actor; singer
- Years active: 1990–2010
- Family: Choi Jin-sil (sister)

Korean name
- Hangul: 최진영
- Hanja: 崔眞永
- RR: Choe Jinyeong
- MR: Ch'oe Chinyŏng

Choi Jin-young (Korean: 최진영; November 17, 1970 – March 29, 2010) was a South Korean actor and singer.

== Career ==
Choi made his debut as a television commercial model in 1987 and began his acting career three years later. He rose to stardom in 1993 with the popular TV show Our Paradise, and his resemblance to his elder sister, popular actress Choi Jin-sil gave him a head start in his career, while his youthful image helped him gain recognition in various TV dramas, commercials and even films. Choi's acting career floundered but in 1999, after completing military service, he returned to the stage as a singer using the stage name SKY. His first album Final Fantasy was a success, with the popular single "Forever" topping music charts. He released his third and last album in 2004. In 2007, he returned to acting with a supporting role in the series It's OK Because I Love You, but failed to catch much attention.

== Personal life ==
When Choi Jin-sil committed suicide on October 2, 2008, photos of Choi in tears clutching his sister's picture shook the nation, and fans wept with him as he led her funeral procession. Acting upon his late sister's wishes to finish college, he belatedly enrolled in Hanyang University to study acting in 2009, and played Demetrius in a staging of Shakespeare's A Midsummer Night's Dream.

Suffering from depression after his sister's death, Choi canceled engagements for more than a year. Friends later said he made several suicide attempts and had his stomach pumped for a drug overdose in 2009. Refusing his mother's pleas that he see a doctor, Choi relied instead on nonprescription tranquilizers he bought from a pharmacy. In January 2010, Choi signed with a new agency, MCloud Entertainment, and announced plans on March 2 to resume activities in the first half of the year, but his approaching comeback added to his stress and he increasingly felt frustrated that he wasn't getting cast in any TV series.

== Death ==
On March 29, 2010, Choi hanged himself with an electrical cord in the attic of his apartment in Nonhyeon-dong, Seoul. When Choi did not answer the phone, Chung alerted Choi's mother, and the two hurried to his home together. His body was found by his mother and a woman identified as Chung, who was his junior in college. They called the police and a 119 rescue squad around 2:14 pm. Choi was rushed to Gangnam Severance Hospital for CPR at 2:46 p.m. but was pronounced dead on arrival.

Choi's body was cremated and his ashes were buried next to his sister at the Kapsan Cemetery in Yangpyeong, Gyeonggi Province.

== Filmography ==
=== Television series ===
- 92 Whale Hunting (KBS2, 1992)
- Our Paradise 2 (MBC, 1993)
- Landscaping with My Wife (KBS2, 1996)
- City Men and Women (SBS, 1996)
- Power of Love (MBC, 1996)
- Drops (MBC, 1997)
- It's OK Because I Love You (KBS2, 2007)

=== Film ===
- Well, Let's Look at the Sky Sometimes (1990)
- You Know What? It's a Secret 2 (1991)
- Does the American Moon Rise Over Itaewon? (1991)
- Beyond the Mountain (1991)
- Teenage Love Song (1991)
- I Want to Live Just Until 20 Years Old (1992)
- A Distant and Distant Future (1995)
- Final Blow (1996)
- Open the Door to Youth (1996)

== Theater ==
- A Midsummer Night's Dream (2009)

== Discography ==
Album information	Track listing
Final Fantasy: 1st Album; Released: November 17, 1999; Label: Doremi Media / KT Music	Track listing: 1. 영원; 2. 회상; 3. My Lady; 4. Blue Morning; 5. 다시 사랑할 수 있는 날까지; 6. 작은 시간; 7. Fell Empty; 8. 언제나 항상 내 곁에; 9. The Best Is Yet To Come; 10. 영원 (bonus track/MR)
영원 II: 2nd Album; Released: November 12, 2001; Label: Wawa Entertainment	Track listing: 1. 24시간의 신화; 2. 인연; 3. 悲歌 (비가); 4. 너를 위해; 5. 영원 II; 6. 고백; 7. 罰 (벌); 8. 사랑하지만; 9. 男兒一言重千今 (남아일언중천금); 10. 내 안의 너 11. 영원의 빛 (instrumental); 12. Never Sky; 13. 비야
Sky the 3rd: 3rd Album; Released: September 23, 2004; Label: Korean Association of Phonogram Producers	Track listing: 1. 백야; 2. 그때까지만; 3. 나는 너를 A 4. 기약; 5. 나를; 6. 다시 시작; 7. 나는 너를 B 8. 그녀는 눈물만; 9. 바라만 볼께요; 10. 사랑하니까; 11. 그때까지만 (MR)

== Awards ==
- 1991 Chunsa Film Art Awards: Best New Actor (Beyond the Mountain)
- 1999 SBS Gayo Daejeon: Rock Award
- 2000 Mnet Asian Music Awards: Best New Male Artist
- 2000 대한민국 영상음반대상: Best Newcomer
- 2000 Golden Disk Awards: Best Newcomer
