= Samsung Global Research =

Private think tank in South Korea

Samsung Global Research (SGR; Korean: 삼성글로벌리서치) is a private-sector think tank in South Korea, covering various research areas; from high-tech to issues and trends shaping the East Asian economic and business environment. It was established in 1986 as part of Samsung Life.

== History ==
- Jul. 1986: Established as an affiliated center of Samsung Life
- Apr. 1991: Incorporated as Samsung Economic Research Institute
- Oct. 1993: "SERI Club," a membership-based information service started
- Oct. 1996: Opened Internet homepage www.seri-samsung.org
- Nov. 2004: Opened SERIWorld.org, an English website for a global audience
- Mar. 2006: Samsung Economy Research Institute Beijing Office (SERIChina)'s official website www.SERIChina.org opened
- Jun. 2010: Opened a mobile website m.seri.org, the first for a Korean private think tank
- Dec. 2021: Name changed to Samsung Global Research (SGR)

== Organization ==
- President: Kim Wonjoon

== Research areas ==
- Management strategy research
- Research coordination
- Knowledge management office
- Public policy research
- Technology & industry research
- Human resources research
- Macroeconomics research
- Global studies
