= How to Steal a Dog (film) =

2014 film

- Theatrical poster
- Directed by: Kim Sung-ho
- Written by: Kim Sung-ho; Shin Yeon-shick
- Based on: How to Steal a Dog by Barbara O'Connor
- Produced by: Eom Yong-hun; Lee Seong-hwan
- Starring: Lee Re; Kim Hye-ja
- Cinematography: Kim Hyeong-ju
- Edited by: Lee Jin
- Music by: Kang Min-guk
- Production company: Samgeori Pictures
- Distributed by: Little Big Pictures; Daemyung Culture Factory
- Release date: December 31, 2014
- Running time: 109 minutes
- Country: South Korea
- Language: Korean

How to Steal a Dog (Korean: 개를 훔치는 완벽한 방법; RR: Gaereul humchineun wanbyeokhan bangbeop; lit. 'The Perfect Way to Steal a Dog') is a 2014 South Korean film directed by Kim Sung-ho, based on the novel of the same name by Barbara O'Connor.

== Plot ==
Ten-year-old Ji-so lives in a car with her mother Jeong-hyeon and younger brother Ji-seok. Her father disappeared after their pizza business went bankrupt. When she sees a missing dog poster with a five-hundred-dollar reward, Ji-so naively believes that that amount of money would be enough to buy her family a house. So she hatches a plan with her brother to find a dog with a rich owner, steal it, and then return the dog by pretending to have found it and get the reward. Their target is Wolly, the dog of an old rich lady who owns the street where their car was parked. While undertaking their "perfect" plan, they befriend Dae-po, a homeless man who ends up living in the abandoned building where they've stashed the dog. But someone else is after Wolly: Soo-young, the old lady's nephew, who'll stop at nothing to gain his aunt's inheritance. In the end, Ji-so and her family do not appear Ji-so and her family finally live in a house but it is for a woman who lives alone, so she invited them to live with her and her baby.

== Cast ==
- Lee Re as Ji-so
- Lee Ji-won as Chae-rang
- Kim Hye-ja as Old lady
- Choi Min-soo as Dae-po
- Kang Hye-jung as Jeong-hyeon
- Lee Chun-hee as Soo-young
- Lee Hong-gi as Seok-gu
- Lee Ki-young as Director Park
- Jo Eun-ji as Chae-rang's mother
- Tablo
- Kim Won-hyo as Traffic policeman
- Kim Jae-hwa as Homeroom teacher
- Hong Eun-taek as Ji-seok
- Kim Do-yeop as Min-seob
- Sam Hammington

== Awards and nominations ==
Year	Award	Category	Recipient	Result
2015	20th Chunsa Film Art Awards	Best Director (Grand Prix)	Kim Sung-ho	Nominated
2015	24th Buil Film Awards	Best Supporting Actress	Kim Hye-ja	Nominated
2015	52nd Grand Bell Awards	Best Director	Kim Sung-ho	Nominated
2015	52nd Grand Bell Awards	Best Supporting Actress	Kim Hye-ja	Nominated
2015	52nd Grand Bell Awards	Best New Actress	Lee Re	Nominated
2015	33rd Ale Kino! Festival	Golden Poznan Goats for Best Children's Feature Movie	Kim Sung-ho	Won
2015	33rd Ale Kino! Festival	Marcinek Award for Best Children's Feature Movie	Kim Sung-ho	Won
2015	33rd Ale Kino! Festival	Teachers' Award for Best Movie	Kim Sung-ho	Won
