= Heavenly Ever After =

South Korean television series

- Promotional poster
- Hangul: 천국보다 아름다운
- Lit.: More Beautiful Than Heaven
- RR: Cheongukboda areumdaun
- MR: Ch'ŏn'gukpoda arŭmdaun
- Genre: Romantic fantasy
- Written by: Lee Nam-kyu; Kim Su-jin
- Directed by: Kim Sok-yoon
- Starring: Kim Hye-ja; Son Suk-ku; Han Ji-min; Lee Jung-eun; Chun Ho-jin; Ryu Deok-hwan
- Music by: Kim Tae-seong
- Country of origin: South Korea
- Original language: Korean
- No. of episodes: 12

Production
- Running time: 69-77 minutes
- Production companies: Studio Phoenix; SLL

Original release
- Network: JTBC
- Release: April 19 – May 25, 2025

Heavenly Ever After (Korean: 천국보다 아름다운) is a 2025 South Korean romantic fantasy television series written by Lee Nam-kyu and Kim Su-jin, directed by Kim Sok-yun, and starring Kim Hye-ja, Son Suk-ku, Han Ji-min, Lee Jung-eun, Chun Ho-jin, and Ryu Deok-hwan. The series centers around the unconventional reunion of an elderly woman and her deceased husband in Heaven. It aired on JTBC from April 19, to May 25, 2025, every Saturday and Sunday at 22:30 (KST). It is also available for streaming on Netflix in selected regions.

== Synopsis ==
An elderly woman named Lee Hae-sook died at the age of 80. Since her husband's accident, she has provided for her family on her own. Hae-sook makes an odd choice when she first arrives at the Heaven Admission Counseling Office: she decides to keep her 80-year-old appearance for her afterlife. Her husband's affectionate remarks that she was gorgeous at all ages, but particularly now, had an impact on this choice. Hae-sook and her husband, Ko Nak-joon, are reunited in Heaven. But she is shocked to see him in his younger, thirty-year-old self, and he is equally shocked to see her looking older. As it happens, Hae-sook is the only individual in Heaven who has decided against going back to their younger self. In the meantime, Nak-joon delivers letters of well wishes from Earth while working as a postman in Heaven. While he waited for Hae-sook, he constructed a stunning home in Heaven.

== Cast and characters ==
- Kim Hye-ja as Lee Hae-sook
  - Ko Eun-bi as young Hae-sook

An 80-year-old wife who reunites with her husband who returned to his 30s in heaven.

- Son Suk-ku as Ko Nak-joon
  - Park Woong as elderly Nak-joon

The heavenly postman who delivers letters of wishes from earth.

- Han Ji-min as Som-yi / young Lee Hae-Sook

A mysterious woman who suddenly appears in heaven one day. She lost her memory and is trying to find her past.

- Lee Jung-eun as Lee Young-ae
  - Kang Bo-kyung as teen Young-ae
  - Shin Su-a as young Young-ae

A person who followed Hae-sook like a parent and teacher when she was alive.

- Chun Ho-jin as Center Director / King Yeomra

The head of the Heaven Support Center who is a godfather-like figure who treats Hae-sook warmly and without formality. He has an identical twin brother who was the King of Hell

- Ryu Deok-hwan as Pastor / Ko Eun-ho
  - Choi Su-ho as young Eun-ho

A Pastor and one of the people with nothing to do in heaven where repentance is meaningless, meets the formidable believer Hae-sook and begins a second life. It was later revealed that he was Hae-sook and Nak-joon's son

- Park Eun-woo as Entry Consultant

The Heaven employee who first talks with Hae-sook in the entry interview but is surprised when she asks to be 80 years old in Heaven.

== Production ==
=== Development ===
The series is written by Lee Nam-kyu and Kim Su-jin, who both wrote The Light in Your Eyes (2019), and directed by Kim Sok-yun, who helmed The Light in Your Eyes (2019) and Behind Your Touch (2023). Studio Phoenix and SLL managed the production.

=== Casting ===
In January 2024, Kim Hye-ja confirmed to appear as the lead actress. In May 2024, it was reported that Han Ji-min, Lee Jung-eun, Son Suk-ku, and Ryu Deok-hwan were cast and positively reviewing the offer.

=== Filming ===
Principal photography began in May 2024.

== Release ==
In December 2024, JTBC unveiled Heavenly Ever After as one of the dramas to be released in the first half of 2025. Two months later, it was reported that the series would air in April 2025. In March 2025, it was confirmed to be broadcast on a Saturday and Sunday timeslot at 22:30 (KST). It will also be available for streaming on Netflix in selected regions.

== Viewership ==
Heavenly Ever After : South Korea viewers per episode (millions)

Season	Episode number												Average
Season	1	2	3	4	5	6	7	8	9	10	11	12	Average
1	1.400	1.514	1.511	1.535	1.399	1.675	1.622	1.628	1.448	1.175	1.745	2.007	1.554

Source: Audience measurement performed nationwide by Nielsen Korea.

Average TV viewership ratings
Ep.	Original broadcast date	Average audience share (Nielsen Korea)	
Ep.	Original broadcast date	Nationwide	Seoul
1	April 19, 2025	5.763% (1st)	6.782% (1st)
2	April 20, 2025	6.126% (1st)	7.156% (1st)
3	April 26, 2025	5.962% (1st)	6.751% (1st)
4	April 27, 2025	6.381% (1st)	7.222% (1st)
5	May 3, 2025	5.918% (1st)	6.363% (1st)
6	May 4, 2025	6.692% (1st)	7.134% (1st)
7	May 10, 2025	6.410% (1st)	7.466% (1st)
8	May 11, 2025	6.885% (1st)	7.640% (1st)
9	May 17, 2025	6.108% (1st)	6.666% (1st)
10	May 18, 2025	4.946% (1st)	5.275% (1st)
11	May 24, 2025	7.013% (1st)	7.099% (1st)
12	May 25, 2025	8.345% (1st)	8.851% (1st)
Average		6.379%	7.033%
In the table above, the blue numbers represent the lowest ratings and the red numbers represent the highest ratings.; This drama aired on a cable channel/pay TV which normally has a relatively smaller audience compared to free-to-air TV/public broadcasters (KBS, SBS, MBC, and EBS).

== Accolades ==
Award ceremony	Year	Category	Nominee	Result	Ref.
Global OTT Awards	2025	Best Visual Effects	Heavenly Ever After	Nominated	
Global OTT Awards	2025	Best Original Song	"Heavenly Ever After" by Lim Young-woong	Nominated	
