= Kim Hye-ja =

South Korean actress (born 1941)

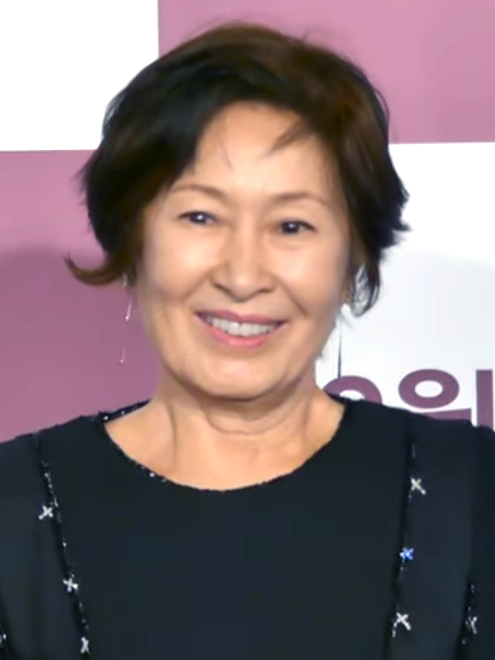
- Kim in February 2019
- Born: October 25, 1941 (age 85); Keijō, Korea, Empire of Japan
- Education: Ewha Womans University (dropped out)
- Occupations: Actress; humanitarian
- Years active: 1963–present
- Spouse: Im Jong-chan (m. 1961; died 1998)
- Children: 2
- Honours: Eungwan Order of Cultural Merit (2019)

Korean name
- Hangul: 김혜자
- Hanja: 金惠子
- RR: Gim Hyeja
- MR: Kim Hyeja

Kim Hye-ja (Korean: 김혜자; born October 25, 1941) is a South Korean actress and humanitarian. Best known to South Korean audiences as the archetypal mother figure in popular television series such as Country Diaries (1980–2002), What Is Love? (1991), My Mother's Sea (1993), and Roses and Beansprouts (1999). Kim drew international critical acclaim in the noir thriller Mother (2009), The Light in Your Eyes (2019), Our Blues (2022) and Heavenly Ever After (2025).

== Early life ==
Kim was born on October 25, 1941, in Keijō, Korea, Empire of Japan (present-day Gyeonggi Province, Seoul, South Korea).

Kim was studying Living Art at Ewha Womans University when she dropped out of college to pursue a career in acting.

== Career ==
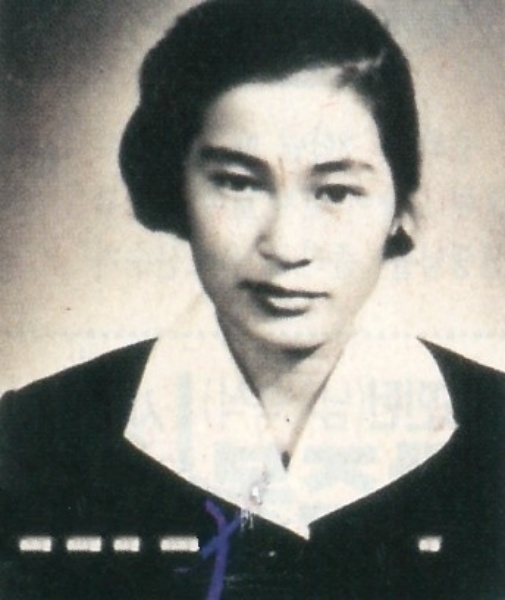
Kim c. 1963

Kim made her acting debut in 1963, and went on to star in more than 90 television dramas, including I Sell Happiness (1978), Sand Castle (1988), Winter Mist (1989), What Is Love? (1991), My Mother's Sea (1993), You and I (1997), and Roses and Beansprouts (1999). Country Diaries, in which she appeared for 22 years, is particularly notable for making Kim into a household name and cementing her image among South Korean audiences as an iconic, unconditionally loving and self-sacrificing mother. Because of this wholesome onscreen persona, CJ CheilJedang hired her to endorse their products and appear in their advertisements for nearly 30 years, from 1975 to 2002.

Though she won Best Actress at the Manila International Film Festival in 1983 for Late Autumn and occasionally acted in stage plays and musicals, Kim was most active in television for four decades. She holds the record of having won the Grand Prize (Daesang) (Note: A Daesang (Korean: 대상), which translates to "Grand Prize", is the highest honor given out at South Korean award ceremonies.) at the MBC Drama Awards the most times (3): in 1988, 1992, and 1999. Kim is the first and only person to have won the Daesang four times at the Baeksang Arts Awards: in 1979, 1989, 2009, and 2019.

As Kim grew older, she expressed her disappointment in being relegated to supporting roles. Then in 2008, screenwriter Kim Soo-hyun cast Kim in the leading role of a woman who declares a one-year break from her family after spending decades as a housewife looking after her three children, a husband and a widowed father-in-law in Mom's Dead Upset. Kim's character broke free from stereotypical South Korean TV mothers in her desire for independence, and initial misgivings that viewers would find her unsympathetic turned out to be unfounded, with the series recording a peak viewership rating of 42.7%.

But 2009 marked another turning point in Kim's career, when she was cast in her first film a decade after Mayonnaise (1999). Acclaimed director Bong Joon-ho had long been an enthusiastic admirer of Kim's, and he said he'd wanted to make a film centered around the veteran actress, then it occurred to him that being the national symbol of motherhood might be as much a burden for Kim as it was an honor. So he decided to craft a role that would showcase Kim's talents and depict the duality of motherhood, then spent four years convincing her to take the role. In Mother, Kim surprised Korean audiences with her intense performance as a middle-aged single mother who obsessively loves her mentally handicapped son and sets out to prove his innocence when he's accused of murder. Bong said he would have given up the project if Kim had not accepted his offer, "Without Kim Hye-ja, Mother wouldn't exist." Kim returned the compliment, saying Bong helped her "reactivate all the cells that have been dormant in (her) body." The film received critical acclaim from domestic audiences and international film festivals, and Kim won numerous acting awards. She was the first ever Korean actress to be named Best Actress by the Los Angeles Film Critics Association.

From 2011 to 2012, Kim headlined Living Among the Rich, one of the inaugural programs of newly launched cable channel jTBC. It was Kim's first sitcom in her 48-year career, and it followed her character as she and her family move into a rundown building in the wealthy area of southern Seoul and struggle to keep pace with their well-off neighbors.

She returned to the theater in 2013 to 2014 with Oscar, Letters to God, a Korean stage adaptation of the French novel Oscar and the Lady in Pink. In the one-woman show, Kim played 11 roles, including Oscar, a 10-year-old boy dying of leukemia, and the nurse (named Jang-mi or Granny Rose) that he confides in.

In late 2014, she played a rich and fussy widow in How to Steal a Dog, based on the same-titled novel by Barbara O'Connor.

== Other activities ==
=== Ambassadorship ===
Kim has been a goodwill ambassador for the nonprofit Christian relief organization World Vision Korea since 1991. She has visited refugee camps in war-torn and poverty-stricken regions in more than 20 countries around the globe, including Ethiopia, Kenya, India, Bangladesh and Sierra Leone, and sponsors 103 children from underdeveloped countries. In 2004, she wrote and published a book based on her experiences titled Don't Beat Someone, Even with Flowers, and donated all proceeds from its sales to underprivileged children in North Korea.

=== Philanthropy ===
In March 2023, Kim donated ₩100 million to help 2023 Turkey–Syria earthquake, by donating money through World Vision.

== Filmography ==
=== Film ===
Year	Title	Role	Notes/Ref.
1982	Late Autumn	Hye-rim	
1999	Mayonnaise	Mom	
2009	Mother	Mother	
2014	How to Steal a Dog	Old lady	
2017	The Way	Soon-ae	
2026	Still Shining	Sun-ok	Releasing at BIFF

=== Television series ===
Year	Title	Role	Ref.
1969	Frog Husband		
1971	Chief Inspector		
1975	Bride Diary		
1977	I Regret It		
1978	I Sell Happiness		
1978	Even If the Wind Blows		
1979	Mom, I Like Dad		
1980	Country Diaries (until 2002)	Chairman Kim's wife	
1980	Gan-yang-rok		
1980	Terminal		
1981	Let Us Love		
1982	Yesterday and Tomorrow		
1983	Infant		
1984	Missing		
1985	500 Years of Joseon: "The Wind Orchid"	Queen Munjeong	
1986	First Love		
1988	Sand Castle	Jang Hyun-joo	
1989	The 2nd Republic	Kim Ok-sook	
1989	Winter Mist	Seo Myung-ae	
1989	Your Toast	Jin Sang-shim	
1989	A Happy Woman		
1990	What Do Women Want?	Jung-hee	
1990	Still Forty-nine		
1991	What Is Love?	Yeo Soon-ja	
1992	Two Women	Oh Hye-jung	
1993	My Mother's Sea	Young-hee	
1994	A Human Land	Kim Shil-dan	
1995	Woman	Song Min-sook	
1996	Salted Mackerel	Kim Gong-shim	
1997	Your Mother's Story		
1997	You and I	Kim Eun-soon	
1999	Roses and Beansprouts	Lee Pil-nyeo	
2002	Since We Met	Jo Nam-deuk	
2004	The Autumn of Major General Hong	Heo Young-sook	
2005	Smile of Spring Day	Park Nae-soon	
2006	Princess Hours	Queen Dowager Park	
2008	Mom's Dead Upset	Kim Han-ja	
2011	Living Among the Rich	Kim Hye-ja	
2015	Unkind Ladies	Kang Soon-ok	
2016	Dear My Friends	Jo Hee-ja	
2019	The Light in Your Eyes	Kim Hye-ja	
2021	Country Diaries 2021	Chairman Kim's wife	
2022	Our Blues	Kang Ok-dong	
2025	Heavenly Ever After	Lee Hae-sook	

== Theater ==
Year	Title	Role
1987	Before the Rooster Crows Over Judah	
1991	19 and 80	Maude
1997	King David	
	The Marriage of Figaro	
	Our Broadway Mama	
2001	Shirley Valentine	Shirley Valentine
2007	Doubt	Sister Aloysius
2013–2014	Oscar, Letters to God	Oscar/Jang-mi/Parents/Peggy Blue etc.

== Bibliography ==
Year	Title	Publisher	ISBN
1994	Kim Hye-ja's Small Voice	People	ISBN 8985947028
2004	Don't Beat Someone, Even with Flowers	Ancient Futures	ISBN 8995501405
2011	Small World (Watching the World Unfold; Before Becoming an Adult)	Darim	ISBN 9788961770514

== Accolades ==
=== Awards and nominations ===
Year presented, name of the award ceremony, award category, nominated work and the result of the nomination
Year	Award	Category	Nominated work	Result
1966	2nd Baeksang Arts Awards	Best New Actress – Television		Won
1976	12th Baeksang Arts Awards	Best Actress – Television	Bride Diary	Won
1978	14th Baeksang Arts Awards	Best Actress – Television	You	Won
1979	15th Baeksang Arts Awards	Grand Prize – Television	I Sell Happiness	Won
1979	15th Baeksang Arts Awards	Best Actress – Television	I Sell Happiness	Won
1982	21st Grand Bell Awards	Best Actress	Late Autumn	Nominated
1983	2nd Manila International Film Festival	Best Actress	Late Autumn	Won
1988	24th Dong-A Theatre Awards	Best Actress	19 and 80	Won
1988	MBC Drama Awards	Grand Prize (Daesang)	Sand Castle	Won
1989	16th Korea Broadcasting Awards	Best Actress	Winter Mist	Won
1989	25th Baeksang Arts Awards	Grand Prize – Television	Winter Mist, Sand Castle	Won
1989	25th Baeksang Arts Awards	Best Actress – Television	Winter Mist, Sand Castle	Won
1992	MBC Drama Awards	Grand Prize (Daesang)	What Is Love?	Won
1996	4th Korea Advertisers Association Consumer's Choice	Good Model Award	—N/a	Won
1999	36th Grand Bell Awards	Best Actress	Mayonnaise	Nominated
1999	1st Social Welfare Day	Presidential Commendation	—N/a	Won
1999	MBC Drama Awards	Grand Prize (Daesang)	Roses and Beansprouts	Won
1999	1st Elizabeth Arden Visible Difference Awards	Recipient	—N/a	Won
2002	MBC Hall of Fame	Recipient		Won
2003	14th Wiam Jang Ji-yeon Prize	Recipient	—N/a	Won
2003	2nd Star 선행 대상	Recipient	—N/a	Won
2003	1st Feminist Award in Pop Culture and Arts	Recipient	—N/a	Won
2008	KBS Drama Awards	Grand Prize (Daesang)	Mom's Dead Upset	Won
2008	KBS Drama Awards	Top Excellence Award, Actress	Mom's Dead Upset	Nominated
2009	45th Baeksang Arts Awards	Grand Prize – Television	Mom's Dead Upset	Won
2009	45th Baeksang Arts Awards	Best Actress – Television	Mom's Dead Upset	Nominated
2009	2nd Style Icon Awards	Beautiful Sharing Award	—N/a	Won
2009	18th Golden Rooster and Hundred Flowers Film Festival	Best Actress in a Foreign Film	Mother	Won
2009	3rd Asia Pacific Screen Awards	Best Actress	Mother	Won
2009	30th Blue Dragon Film Awards	Best Leading Actress	Mother	Nominated
2009	10th Busan Film Critics Awards	Best Actress	Mother	Won
2009	29th Korean Association of Film Critics Awards	Best Actress	Mother	Won
2009	18th Buil Film Awards	Best Actress	Mother	Won
2009	46th Grand Bell Awards	Best Actress	Mother	Nominated
2009	12th Director's Cut Awards	Best Actress	Mother	Won
2009	10th Women in Film Korea Awards	Best Actress	Mother	Won
2009	Cine21 Film Awards	Best Actress	Mother	Won
2010	Asian Film Critics Association Awards	Best Actress	Mother	Won
2010	1st KOFRA Film Awards	Best Actress	Mother	Won
2010	7th Max Movie Awards	Best Actress	Mother	Won
2010	IndieWire Critics Poll	Best Actress	Mother	5th place
2010	Village Voice Film Poll	Best Actress	Mother	3rd place
2010	Dublin Film Critics' Circle	Best Actress	Mother	5th place
2010	4th Asian Film Awards	Best Actress	Mother	Won
2010	46th Baeksang Arts Awards	Best Actress – Film	Mother	Nominated
2010	36th Los Angeles Film Critics Association Awards	Best Actress	Mother	Won
2010	14th Online Film Critics Society Awards	Best Actress	Mother	Nominated
2010	World Vision International	Special Award	—N/a	Won
2011	17th Chlotrudis Awards	Best Actress	Mother	Won
2011	1st Beautiful Artists Awards	Recipient	—N/a	Won
2011	30th Sejong Culture Award	Recipient, Social Volunteering category	—N/a	Won
2014	9th Interpark Golden Ticket Awards	Best Actress in a Play	Oscar, Letters to God	Won
2015	24th Buil Film Awards	Best Supporting Actress	How to Steal a Dog	Nominated
2015	52nd Grand Bell Awards	Best Supporting Actress	How to Steal a Dog	Nominated
2015	KBS Drama Awards	Top Excellence Award, Actress	Unkind Ladies	Nominated
2015	KBS Drama Awards	Excellence Award, Actress in a Mid-length Drama	Unkind Ladies	Nominated
2015	KBS Drama Awards	PD Award (chosen by PDs from KBS, SBS & MBC)	Unkind Ladies	Won
2015	4th CARI K Drama Awards	Best Supporting Actress	Unkind Ladies	Won
2016	tvN10 Awards	Best Actress	Dear My Friends	Nominated
2019	55th Baeksang Arts Awards	Grand Prize – Television	The Light in Your Eyes	Won
2019	55th Baeksang Arts Awards	Best Actress – Television	The Light in Your Eyes	Nominated
2019	24th Asian Television Awards	Best Actress in a Leading Role	The Light in Your Eyes	Nominated

=== State honors ===
List of State Honour(s)
State	Award Ceremony	Year	Honor	Ref.
South Korea	Korean Popular Culture and Arts Awards (Note: Since 2010 Honors are given at the Korean Popular Culture and Arts Awards, arranged by the Korea Creative Content Agency and hosted by the Ministry of Culture, Sports and Tourism.)	2019	Eungwan Order of Cultural Merit	

=== Listicles ===
Name of publisher, year listed, name of listicle, and placement
Publisher	Year	List	Placement	Ref.
KBS	2023	The 50 people who made KBS shine	27th	
Korean Film Council	2021	Korean Actors 200 (Note: Introduces 200 actors that best represent the present and future of Korean cinema to the people in the film industry all over the world.)	Included	
