= Baeksang Arts Award for Best Actress – Television =

South Korean annual television award

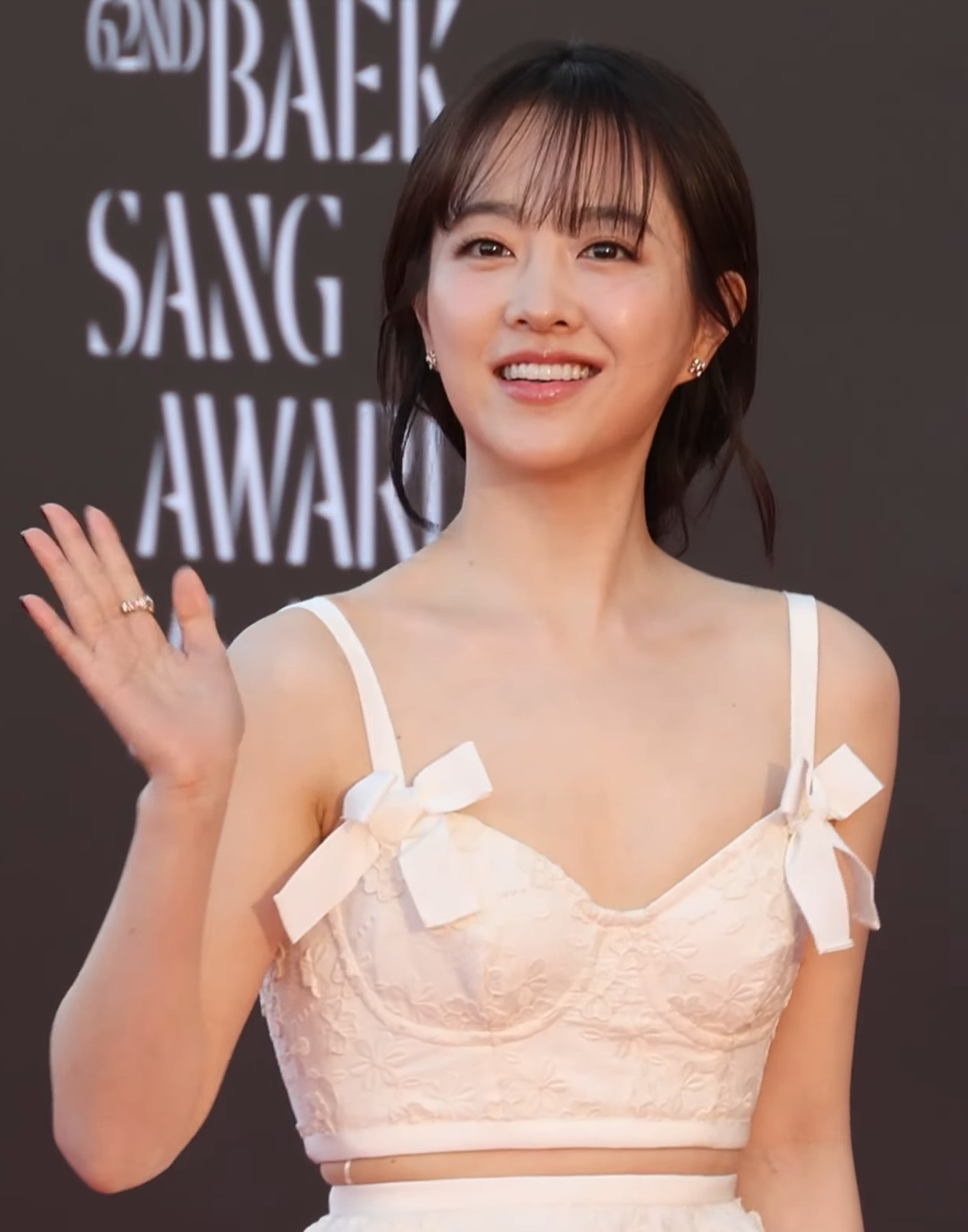
- 2026 recipient: Park Bo-young
- Awarded for: Best performance by an actress in a leading role in a South Korean series
- Country: South Korea
- Presented by: Baeksang Arts Awards
- Most recent winner: Park Bo-young; Our Unwritten Seoul (2026)
- Website: baeksangartsawards

The Baeksang Arts Award for Best Actress – Television (Korean: 백상예술대상 TV부문 여자 최우수 연기상; RR: Baeksang Yesul Daesang TV Bumun Yeoja Choeusu Yeongisang) is an award presented annually at the Baeksang Arts Awards ceremony organised by Ilgan Sports and JTBC Plus, affiliates of JoongAng Ilbo, usually in the second quarter of each year in Seoul.

== Winners and nominees ==
Table key
‡	Indicates the winner

=== 1970s ===
Year	Winner	Television series	Original title	Role(s)	Network
1974 (10th)	Yeo Woon-kay ‡	Mother	어머니		TBC
1975 (11th)	Kim Ja-ok ‡	Narcissus	수선화		MBC
1975 (11th)	Jung Hye-sun ‡	Reed	갈대		MBC
1975 (11th)	Ahn In-sook ‡	Yoon Ji-kyung	윤지경		TBC
1976 (12th)	Hong Se-mi ‡	Conditions of Happiness	행복의 조건		TBC
1976 (12th)	Kim Hye-ja ‡	Bride Diary	신부일기		MBC
1977 (13th)	Kim Yoon-gyeong ‡	Reunion	재회		MBC
1977 (13th)	Kang Boo-ja ‡	Wedding March	결혼행진곡		TBC
1978 (14th)	Kim Hye-ja ‡	You	당신		MBC
1978 (14th)	Kang Hyo-shil ‡	Moon-gi and Soo-mi	문기와 수미		KBS
1979 (15th)	Kim Young-ok ‡	I Sell Happiness	행복을 팝니다		MBC
1979 (15th)	Jung Hye-sun ‡	I Sell Happiness	행복을 팝니다		MBC
1979 (15th)	Kim Hye-ja ‡	I Sell Happiness	행복을 팝니다		MBC

=== 1980s ===
Year	Winner	Television series	Original title	Role(s)	Network
1980 (16th)	Kim Min-ja ‡	A Lonely Affair	고독한 관계		TBC
1981 (17th)	Kim Young-ran ‡	Mischievous Milady	교동마님	Jeong Nan-jeong	MBC
1981 (17th)	Chang Mi-hee ‡	Eulhwa	을화		KBS1
1982 (18th)	Kim Young-ae ‡	Nocturne	야상곡		MBC
1982 (18th)	Hwang Jung-ah ‡	The Witty Professor	재치선생		KBS1
1983 (19th)	Lee Kyung-jin ‡	Stairs of Happiness	행복의 계단		KBS1
1984 (20th)	Jung Hye-sun ‡	Infant	간난이		MBC
1985 (21st)	Jung Ae-ri ‡	Love and Truth	사랑과 진실	Lee Hyo-sun	MBC
1986 (22nd)	Kim Yong-rim ‡	Silver Grass	억새풀		MBC
1987 (23rd)	Han Hye-sook ‡	Windfall	노다지		KBS1
1988 (24th)	Kim Chung ‡	Love and Ambition	사랑과 야망		MBC
1989 (25th)	Park Won-sook ‡	Land	토지	Im Yi-ne	KBS1
1989 (25th)	Kim Hye-ja ‡	Winter Mist	겨울 안개	Seo Myung-ae	MBC
1989 (25th)	Kim Hye-ja ‡	Sand Castle	모래성	Jang Hyun-joo	MBC

=== 1990s ===
Year	Winner	Television series	Original title	Role(s)	Network
1990 (26th)	Go Doo-shim ‡	Fetters of Love	사랑의 굴레	Han Jung-sook	KBS1
1991 (27th)	Ha Hee-ra ‡	What Women Want	여자는 무엇으로 사는가	Young-chae	MBC
1991 (27th)	Lee Hwi-hyang ‡	Ambitious Times	야망의 세월	Gelsomina	KBS2
1992 (28th)	Chae Shi-ra ‡	Eyes of Dawn	여명의 눈동자	Yoon Yeo-ok	MBC
1993 (29th)	Go Doo-shim ‡	My Husband's Woman	남편의 여자	Park Mi-jeong	KBS2
1993 (29th)	Kim Hee-ae ‡	Sons and Daughters	아들과 딸	Lee Hoo-nam	MBC
1993 (29th)	Choi Jin-sil	Jealousy	질투	Yoo Ha-kyung	MBC
1993 (29th)	Youn Yuh-jung	Gwanchon Essay	관촌수필	Man-man	SBS
1994 (30th)	Jung Hye-sun ‡	Mother	어머니	Mother	MBC
1994 (30th)	Go Hyun-jung	My Mother's Sea	엄마의 바다	Kim Yeong-seo	MBC
1994 (30th)	Choi Myung-gil	Marriage	결혼	Na Ji-yeong	SBS
1994 (30th)	Ha Hee-ra	The Break of Dawn	먼동	Song Bo-kyung	KBS1
1995 (31st)	Kim Yoon-gyeong ‡	When I Miss You	당신이 그리워질 때	Seo Jung-sook	KBS1
1995 (31st)	Chae Si-ra	My Son's Woman	아들의 여자	Kim Chae-won	MBC
1995 (31st)	Go Hyun-jung	Sandglass	모래시계	Yoon Hye-rin	SBS
1995 (31st)	Kim Hee-ae	Kareisky	까레이스키	Seung Nam-young	MBC
1996 (32nd)	Kim Hye-soo ‡	Oxtail Soup (Gomtang)	곰탕	Young Soon-nyeo	SBS
1996 (32nd)	Choi Jin-sil	Apartment	아파트	Cha Na-ri	MBC
1996 (32nd)	Kim ji-young	Even if the Wind Blows	바람은 불어도	Mal-soon	KBS1
1996 (32nd)	Jung Ae-ri	Road	길	Shin Min-jung	KBS1
1997 (33rd)	Kim Young-ae ‡	The Brothers' River	형제의 강	Lee Soon-rye	SBS
1997 (33rd)	Song Chae-hwan	First Love	첫사랑	Sung Chan-ok	KBS2
1997 (33rd)	Na Moon-hee	The Most Beautiful Goodbye in the World	세상에서 가장 아름다운 이별	Kim In-hee	MBC
1997 (33rd)	Hwang Shin-hye	Lovers	애인	Yeon Yeo-kyeong	MBC
1998 (34th)	Hwang Shin-hye ‡	Cinderella	신데렐라	Jang Hye-jin	MBC
1998 (34th)	Lee Mi-sook	Snail	달팽이	Jeong Yoon-joo	SBS
1998 (34th)	Choi Myung-gil	Tears of the Dragon	용의 눈물	Queen Wongyeong	KBS1
1998 (34th)	Go Doo-shim	Offspring	새끼	Seon-ju's mom	SBS
1998 (34th)	Jung Hye-sun	Because of Love	정때문에	Kim Heon-sun	KBS1
1999 (35th)	Shim Eun-ha ‡	Trap of Youth	청춘의 덫	Seo Yoon-hee	SBS
1999 (35th)	Song Yoon-ah	Mister Q	미스터 큐	Hwang Joo-ri	SBS
1999 (35th)	Kim Ji-soo	See and See Again	보고 또 보고	Jung Eun-joo	MBC
1999 (35th)	Yoo Ho-jeong	Lie	거짓말	Jung Eun-soo	KBS2

=== 2000s ===
Year	Winner and nominees	Television series	Original title	Role(s)	Network
2000 (36th)	Kim Young-ae ‡	Waves	파도	Kim Hyun-sook	SBS
2000 (36th)	Kim Hye-soo	Kook Hee	국희	Min Gook-hee	MBC
2000 (36th)	Chae Si-ra	The King and the Queen	왕과 비	Queen Sohye	KBS1
2000 (36th)	Kim Hye-ja	Roses and Bean Sprouts	장미와 콩나물	Lee Pil-nyu	MBC
2001 (37th)	Won Mi-kyung ‡	Housewife's Rebellion	아줌마	Oh Sam-sook	MBC
2001 (37th)	Go Doo-shim	Virtue	덕이	Kim Soon-rye	SBS
2001 (37th)	Bae Jong-ok	Foolish Love	바보같은 사랑	Jung Ok-hee	KBS2
2002 (38th)	Jeon In-hwa ‡	Ladies of the Palace	여인천하	Queen Munjeong	KBS
2002 (38th)	Kim Hyun-joo	Her House	그 여자네 집	Park Young-chae	MBC
2002 (38th)	Lee Mi-yeon	Empress Myeongseong	명성황후	Empress Myeongseong	KBS2
2002 (38th)	Kang Soo-yeon	Ladies of the Palace	여인천하	Jeong Nan-jung	SBS
2003 (39th)	Kim Hee-ae ‡	Wife	아내	Kim Na-young	KBS
2003 (39th)	Jang Seo-hee	Miss Mermaid	인어아가씨	Eun Ah Ri Young	MBC
2003 (39th)	Lee Na-young	Ruler of Your Own World	네 멋대로 해라	Jeon Kyung	MBC
2003 (39th)	Go Doo-shim	Like a Flowing River	흐르는 강물처럼	Park Soon-ae	SBS
2004 (40th)	Ha Ji-won ‡	Something Happened in Bali	발리에서 생긴 일	Lee Soo-jung	SBS
2004 (40th)	Go Doo-shim	Her Beautiful Story	꽃보다 아름다워	Lee Yeong-ja	KBS2
2004 (40th)	Lee Young-ae	Jewel in the Palace	대장금	Seo Jang-geum	MBC
2004 (40th)	Kim Hee-ae	Perfect Love	완전한 사랑	Ha Young-ae	SBS
2005 (41st)	Kim Jung-eun ‡	Lovers in Paris	파리의 연인	Kang Tae-young	SBS
2005 (41st)	Go Hyun-jung	Spring Day	봄날	Seo Jung-eun	SBS
2005 (41st)	Song Hye-kyo	Full House	풀하우스	Han Ji-eun	KBS2
2006 (42nd)	Choi Jin-sil ‡	My Rosy Life	장밋빛 인생	Maeng Soon-yi	KBS2
2006 (42nd)	Kim Hyun-joo	Toji, the Land	토지	Choi Seo-hee	SBS
2006 (42nd)	Kim Sun-a	My Lovely Sam Soon	내 이름은 김삼순	Kim Sam-soon	MBC
2007 (43rd)	Son Ye-jin ‡	Alone in Love	연애시대	Yoo Eun-ho	SBS
2007 (43rd)	Ha Ji-won	Hwang Jini	황진이	Hwang Jini	KBS2
2007 (43rd)	Han Hye-jin	Jumong	삼한지-주몽 편	Lady Soseono	MBC
2007 (43rd)	Han Ye-seul	Couple or Trouble	환상의 커플	Anna Jo / Na Sang-shil	MBC
2007 (43rd)	Park Jin-hee	Please Come Back, Soon-ae	돌아와요 순애씨	Han Cho-eun	SBS
2008 (44th)	Yoon Eun-hye ‡	Coffee Prince	커피프린스 1호점	Go Eun-chan	MBC
2008 (44th)	Han Ji-min	Capital Scandal	경성 스캔들	Na Yeo-kyung	KBS2
2008 (44th)	Kim Hee-ae	My Husband's Woman	내 남자의 여자	Lee Hwa-young	SBS
2008 (44th)	Kim Hyun-joo	In-soon Is Pretty	인순이는 예쁘다	Park In-soon	KBS2
2008 (44th)	Park Jin-hee	War of Money	쩐의 전쟁	Seo Joo-hee	SBS
2009 (45th)	Moon Geun-young ‡	Painter of the Wind	바람의 화원	Sin Yun-bok	SBS
2009 (45th)	Han Ji-hye	East of Eden	에덴의 동쪽	Kim Ji-hyun	MBC
2009 (45th)	Han Ye-seul	Tazza	타짜	Lee Nan-sook / Mi-na	SBS
2009 (45th)	Kim Hye-ja	Mom's Dead Upset	엄마가 뿔났다	Kim Hanja	KBS2
2009 (45th)	Kim Ji-soo	Women in the Sun	태양의 여자	Shin Do-young / Kim Han-sook	KBS2

=== 2010s ===
Year	Winner and nominees	Television series	Original title	Role(s)	Network
2010 (46th)	Kim Nam-joo ‡	Queen of Housewives	내조의 여왕	Chun Ji-ae	MBC
2010 (46th)	Go Hyun-jung	Queen Seondeok	선덕여왕	Mishil	MBC
2010 (46th)	Han Hyo-joo	Brilliant Legacy	찬란한 유산	Go Eun-sung	SBS
2010 (46th)	Kim So-yeon	Iris	아이리스	Kim Seon-hwa	KBS2
2010 (46th)	Kim Tae-hee	Iris	아이리스	Choi Seung-hee	KBS2
2011 (47th)	Han Hyo-joo ‡	Dong Yi	동이	Choi Dong-yi (later Sukbin Choe)	MBC
2011 (47th)	Ha Ji-won	Secret Garden	시크릿 가든	Gil Ra-im	SBS
2011 (47th)	Jeon In-hwa	Bread, Love and Dreams	제빵왕 김탁구	Seo In-sook	KBS2
2011 (47th)	Kim Ah-joong	Sign	싸인	Go Da-kyung	SBS
2011 (47th)	Park Min-young	Sungkyunkwan Scandal	성균관 스캔들	Kim Yun-hee	KBS2
2012 (48th)	Gong Hyo-jin ‡	The Greatest Love	최고의 사랑	Gu Ae-jung	MBC
2012 (48th)	Kim Hyun-joo	Twinkle Twinkle	반짝반짝 빛나는	Han / Hwang Jung-won	MBC
2012 (48th)	Kim Sun-a	Scent of a Woman	여인의 향기	Lee Yeon-jae	SBS
2012 (48th)	Moon Chae-won	The Princess' Man	공주의 남자	Lee Se-ryung	KBS2
2012 (48th)	Soo Ae	A Thousand Days' Promise	천일의 약속	Lee Seo-yeon	SBS
2013 (49th)	Kim Hee-ae ‡	How Long I've Kissed	아내의 자격	Yoon Seo-rae	JTBC
2013 (49th)	Kim Nam-joo	My Husband Got a Family	넝쿨째 굴러온 당신	Cha Yoon-hee	KBS2
2013 (49th)	Kim Sung-ryung	King of Ambition	야왕	Baek Do-kyung	SBS
2013 (49th)	Lee Bo-young	Seoyoung, My Daughter	내 딸 서영이	Lee Seo-young	KBS2
2013 (49th)	Song Hye-kyo	That Winter, the Wind Blows	그 겨울, 바람이 분다	Oh Young	SBS
2014 (50th)	Lee Bo-young ‡	I Can Hear Your Voice	너의 목소리가 들려	Jang Hye-sung	SBS
2014 (50th)	Go Ara	Reply 1994	응답하라 1994	Sung Na-jung	tvN
2014 (50th)	Jun Ji-hyun	My Love from the Star	별에서 온 그대	Cheon Song-yi	SBS
2014 (50th)	Kim Hye-soo	The Queen of Office	직장의 신	Miss Kim / Kim Jeom-seon	KBS2
2014 (50th)	Kim Ji-soo	One Warm Word	따뜻한 말 한마디	Song Mi-kyung	SBS
2015 (51st)	Song Yoon-ah ‡	Mama	마마	Han Seung-hee	MBC
2015 (51st)	Kim Ok-vin	Steal Heart	유나의 거리	Kang Yoo-na	JTBC
2015 (51st)	Lee Yu-ri	Jang Bo-ri Is Here!	왔다! 장보리	Yeon Min-jung	MBC
2015 (51st)	Moon Jeong-hee	Mama	마마	Seo Ji-eun	MBC
2015 (51st)	Park Shin-hye	Pinocchio	피노키오	Choi In-ha	SBS
2016 (52nd)	Kim Hye-soo ‡	Signal	시그널	Cha Soo-hyun	tvN
2016 (52nd)	Hwang Jung-eum	She Was Pretty	그녀는 예뻤다	Kim Hye-jin	MBC
2016 (52nd)	Kim Hyun-joo	I Have a Lover	애인 있어요	Do Hae-kang / Dokgo Yong-gi	SBS
2016 (52nd)	Ra Mi-ran	Reply 1988	응답하라 1988	Ra Mi-ran	tvN
2016 (52nd)	Song Hye-kyo	Descendants of the Sun	태양의 후예	Kang Mo-yeon	KBS2
2017 (53rd)	Seo Hyun-jin ‡	Another Miss Oh	또 오해영	Oh Hae-young	tvN
2017 (53rd)	Kim Go-eun	Guardian: The Lonely and Great God	쓸쓸하고 찬란하神 – 도깨비	Ji Eun-tak	tvN
2017 (53rd)	Kim Ha-neul	On the Way to the Airport	공항가는 길	Choi Soo-ah	KBS2
2017 (53rd)	Park Bo-young	Strong Girl Bong-soon	힘쎈여자 도봉순	Do Bong-soon	JTBC
2017 (53rd)	Park Shin-hye	The Doctors	닥터스	Yoo Hye-jung	SBS
2018 (54th)	Kim Nam-joo ‡	Misty	미스티	Go Hye-ran	JTBC
2018 (54th)	Kim Sun-a	The Lady in Dignity	품위있는 그녀	Park Bok-ja	JTBC
2018 (54th)	Kim Hee-sun	The Lady in Dignity	품위있는 그녀	Woo Ah-jin	JTBC
2018 (54th)	Shin Hye-sun	My Golden Life	황금빛 내 인생	Seo Ji-An	KBS2
2018 (54th)	Lee Bo-young	Mother	마더	Kang Soo-jin	tvN
2019 (55th)	Yum Jung-ah ‡	Sky Castle	SKY 캐슬	Han Seo-jin	JTBC
2019 (55th)	Kim Seo-hyung	Sky Castle	SKY 캐슬	Kim Joo-young	JTBC
2019 (55th)	Kim Tae-ri	Mr. Sunshine	미스터 션샤인	Go Ae-shin	tvN
2019 (55th)	Kim Hye-ja	The Light in Your Eyes	눈이 부시게	Kim Hye-ja (70)	JTBC
2019 (55th)	IU	My Mister	나의 아저씨	Lee Ji-an	tvN

=== 2020s ===
Year	Winner and nominees	Television series	Original title	Role(s)	Network
2020 (56th)	Kim Hee-ae ‡	The World of the Married	부부의 세계	Ji Sun-woo	JTBC
2020 (56th)	Gong Hyo-jin	When the Camellia Blooms	동백꽃 필 무렵	Oh Dong-baek	KBS2
2020 (56th)	Kim Hye-soo	Hyena	하이에나	Jung Geum-ja / Jung Eun-yeong	SBS
2020 (56th)	Son Ye-jin	Crash Landing on You	사랑의 불시착	Yoon Se-ri	tvN
2020 (56th)	IU	Hotel del Luna	호텔 델루나	Jang Man-wol	tvN
2021 (57th)	Kim So-yeon ‡	The Penthouse: War in Life	펜트하우스	Cheon Seo-jin	SBS
2021 (57th)	Kim So-hyun	River Where the Moon Rises	달이 뜨는 강	Princess Pyeonggang / Yeom Ga-jin / Queen Yeon	KBS2
2021 (57th)	Seo Yea-ji	It's Okay to Not Be Okay	사이코지만 괜찮아	Ko Moon-young	tvN
2021 (57th)	Shin Hye-sun	Mr. Queen	철인왕후	Kim So-yong / Queen Cheorin	tvN
2021 (57th)	Uhm Ji-won	Birthcare Center	산후조리원	Oh Hyun-jin	tvN
2022 (58th)	Kim Tae-ri ‡	Twenty-Five Twenty-One	스물다섯 스물하나	Na Hee-do	tvN
2022 (58th)	Kim Hye-soo	Juvenile Justice	소년 심판	Shim Eun-seok	Netflix
2022 (58th)	Park Eun-bin	The King's Affection	연모	Lee Hwi / Yeon-seon / Da-mi	KBS2
2022 (58th)	Lee Se-young	The Red Sleeve	옷소매 붉은 끝동	Seong Deok-im	MBC
2022 (58th)	Han So-hee	My Name	마이 네임	Yoon Ji-woo / Oh Hye-jin	Netflix
2023 (59th)	Song Hye-kyo ‡	The Glory	더 글로리	Moon Dong-eun	Netflix
2023 (59th)	Kim Ji-won	My Liberation Notes	나의 해방일지	Yeom Mi-jeong	JTBC
2023 (59th)	Kim Hye-soo	Under the Queen's Umbrella	슈룹	Queen Im Hwa-ryeong	tvN
2023 (59th)	Park Eun-bin	Extraordinary Attorney Woo	이상한 변호사 우영우	Woo Young-woo	ENA
2023 (59th)	Bae Suzy	Anna	안나	Lee Yumi / Lee Anna	Coupang Play
2024 (60th)	Lee Hanee ‡	Knight Flower	밤에 피는 꽃	Jo Yeo-hwa	MBC
2024 (60th)	Ra Mi-ran	The Good Bad Mother	나쁜엄마	Jin Young-soon	JTBC
2024 (60th)	Ahn Eun-jin	My Dearest	연인	Yoo Gil-chae	MBC
2024 (60th)	Uhm Jung-hwa	Doctor Cha	닥터 차정숙	Cha Jeong-suk	JTBC
2024 (60th)	Lim Ji-yeon	Lies Hidden in My Garden	마당이 있는 집	Chu Sang-eun	ENA
2025 (61st)	Kim Tae-ri ‡	Jeongnyeon: The Star Is Born	정년이	Yoon Jeong-nyeon	tvN
2025 (61st)	Go Min-si	The Frog	아무도 없는 숲속에서	Yoo Seong-a	Netflix
2025 (61st)	Kim Hye-yoon	Lovely Runner	선재 업고 튀어	Im Sol	tvN
2025 (61st)	IU	When Life Gives You Tangerines	폭싹 속았수다	Oh Ae-sun / Yang Geum-myeong	Netflix
2025 (61st)	Jang Na-ra	Good Partner	굿파트너	Cha Eun-kyung	SBS
2026 (62nd)	Park Bo-young ‡	Our Unwritten Seoul	미지의 서울	Yoo Mi-ji / Yoo Mi-rae	tvN
2026 (62nd)	Lim Yoona	Bon Appétit, Your Majesty	폭군의 셰프	Yeon Ji-yeong	tvN
2026 (62nd)	Kim Go-eun	You and Everything Else	은중과 상연	Yoo Eun-jung	Netflix
2026 (62nd)	Park Ji-hyun	You and Everything Else	은중과 상연	Cheon Sang-yeon	Netflix
2026 (62nd)	Shin Hye-sun	The Art of Sarah	레이디 두아	Sarah Kim / Mok Ga-hui / Du-a / Kim Eun-jae	Netflix

== Multiple awards and nominations ==
The following individuals received two or more Best Actress awards:

Wins	Actress
4	Kim Hee-ae
4	Jung Hye-sun
4	Kim Hye-ja
3	Kim Young-ae
2	Go Doo-shim
2	Kim Hye-soo
2	Kim Nam-joo
2	Kim Tae-ri
2	Kim Yoon-gyeong

The following individuals received four or more Best Actress nominations:

Nominations	Actress
7	Kim Hee-ae
7	Kim Hye-ja
7	Kim Hye-soo
6	Go Doo-shim
5	Jung Hye-sun
5	Kim Hyun-joo
4	Go Hyun-jung
4	Song Hye-kyo

== Sources ==
- "Baeksang Arts Awards Nominees and Winners Lists". Naver Movie (in Korean).
- "Baeksang Arts Awards Winners Lists". Baeksang Arts Awards (in Korean).
