= Mother (2009 film) =

2009 film by Bong Joon Ho

- Theatrical release poster
- Hangul: 마더
- RR: Madeo
- MR: Madŏ
- Directed by: Bong Joon Ho
- Written by: Bong Joon Ho; Park Eun-kyo
- Produced by: Choi Jae-won; Seo Woo-sik
- Starring: Kim Hye-ja; Won Bin
- Cinematography: Hong Kyung-pyo
- Edited by: Moon Sae-kyung
- Music by: Lee Byung-woo
- Production companies: CJ Entertainment; Barunson
- Distributed by: CJ Entertainment
- Release dates: 16 May 2009 (Cannes); 28 May 2009 (South Korea)
- Running time: 128 minutes
- Country: South Korea
- Language: Korean
- Budget: US$5 million
- Box office: US$17.1 million

Mother (Korean: 마더) is a 2009 South Korean neo-noir psychological thriller film directed by Bong Joon Ho, starring Kim Hye-ja and Won Bin. The plot follows a mother who, after her intellectually disabled son is accused of the murder of a young girl, attempts to find the true killer to get her son freed.

The film premiered on 16 May 2009 at the Cannes Film Festival in the Un Certain Regard section, and was released in South Korea on 28 May 2009. It received acclaim from critics, who praised Kim's performance, Bong's direction, screenplay, and the film's uniqueness.

== Plot ==
An unnamed widow lives alone with her only son, selling medicinal herbs in a small town in southern South Korea while conducting unlicensed acupuncture treatments for the town's women on the side to erase bad memories. Her son, Yoon Do-joon, is shy, but prone to attacking anyone who mocks his intellectual disability. She dotes on him and scolds him for hanging out with Jin-tae, a local thug. When Do-joon is nearly hit by a car, he and Jin-tae vandalize the car and attack the driver and passengers as revenge. Jin-tae blames Do-joon for the damage done to the car, and Do-joon is sued. His mother struggles with the burden of the debt.

On his way home from a bar late at night, Do-joon sees a high school girl named Moon Ah-jung walking alone and follows her to an abandoned building. The next morning, she is discovered dead on the rooftop, shocking the town and pressuring the incompetent police to find the killer. Do-joon is arrested for the murder due to circumstantial evidence placing him near the scene of the crime. His mother believes he is innocent, and tries to prove he is not the murderer. However, she is challenged by her self-absorbed lawyer and the community who unanimously blames Do-joon for the crime.

Suspecting Jin-tae of committing the murder, the mother breaks into his house to look for evidence. She takes a golf club, which she believes has blood on it, but when she turns it over to the police and Jin-tae is confronted about it, it becomes clear that the "blood" is just smeared lipstick. Despite her accusation, Jin-tae agrees to help the mother solve the case for a fee.

When the mother questions the people in town about Ah-jung, they tell her the girl was sexually promiscuous and in a relationship with a boy known as Jong-pal, who had escaped a sanatorium. Do-joon attacks another prisoner who calls him "retard". On one of his mother's prison visits, Do-joon recalls a memory of her attempt to kill him and then herself when he was five by lacing their drinks with a pesticide. She tries to apologize, saying she wants to free them both from hardship, but he tells her he never wants to see her again.

The mother learns from a camera shop worker that Ah-jung had frequent nosebleeds and had pictures on her cellphone that she wanted to have printed. Ah-jung's friend is attacked by two young men who are looking for the phone, but the mother rescues her and then pays Jin-tae to interrogate the men, who claim that Ah-jung accepted rice in exchange for sex (and was nicknamed "the rice cake girl"). They say she used her phone to secretly take pictures of her partners, thus making it a potential tool for blackmailing. The mother tracks down the phone, which is hidden at Ah-jung's grandmother's house.

Do-joon remembers seeing an elderly man in the abandoned building on the night of Ah-jung's death and identifies him in one of the pictures on Ah-jung's phone. The mother recognizes the man as a junk collector she once bought an umbrella from and goes to his home to find out what he saw, on the pretense of offering him charity medical services. The collector reveals that he has been troubled since he saw Do-joon kill Ah-jung. He witnessed the two have a short conversation, during which Ah-jung called Do-joon a "retard", and Do-joon then threw a large rock into the shadows in which Ah-jung was standing, hitting her in the head and inadvertently killing her, and then dragged her to the rooftop. Unable to accept the truth, the mother frantically tells the collector that Do-joon is innocent, but the collector picks up the phone to finally report what he has seen to the police. Fearing for her son, the mother bludgeons the collector with a wrench and sets fire to his house.

Later, the police tell the mother that they have found the "real" killer: Jong-pal, who is being presumed guilty after Ah-jung's blood was found on his shirt. The police assume it got there during the murder, but the mother realizes that Jong-pal's story, that the blood is the result of Ah-jung's nose bleeding during consensual sex, is true. Feeling guilty, she visits Jong-pal, who is even more intellectually disabled than her son, and cries for him when she hears he does not have a mother to fight for him, knowing he is going to jail for a crime he did not commit.

Do-joon is freed from prison and Jin-tae picks him up. They pass the collector's burned-down house on the way home and stop to pick through the rubble. During dinner, Do-joon muses to his mother that Jong-pal probably dragged Ah-jung up to the roof so that someone would see she was hurt and help her. As the mother is about to depart from a bus station on a "Thank-You Parents" tour, Do-joon returns her acupuncture kit, which he found in the remains of the junk collector's house, and tells her to be more careful. Jarred by his discovery, she sits on the bus in shock before using the kit to blank out the memory of her son's and her guilty crime. She begins to dance with the other parents on the bus.

== Cast ==
- Kim Hye-ja as Mother, an unnamed widow who is extremely protective of her son and attempts to free him from a murder charge
- Won Bin as Yoon Do-joon, the adult son of Mother, who has an intellectual disability and is accused of the murder of a local girl
- Jin Goo as Jin-tae, a local ne'er do well and one of Do-joon's friends. He bosses Do-joon around, but agrees to help Mother free her son.
- Yoon Je-moon as Je-moon, the detective in charge of Ah-jung's murder case
- Jeon Mi-seon as Mi-seon, a camera-shop worker who helps Mother. She had met Ah-jung before she died.
- Song Sae-byeok as a detective
- Lee Young-suk as the junk collector
- Moon Hee-ra as Moon Ah-jung, a young girl who is murdered, leading the police to arrest Do-joon
- Chun Woo-hee as Mi-na, Jin-tae's girlfriend
- Kim Byung-soon as the detective team leader
- Yeo Moo-young as Do-joon's lawyer
- Lee Mi-do as Hyung-teo, Ah-jung's friend
- Kim Jin-goo as Ah-jung's grandma
- Lee Jung-eun as Ah-jung's relative with glasses
- Hwang Young-hee as Ah-jung's pregnant relative
- Kwak Do-won as charcoal fire man
- Ko Kyu-pil as Ddong Ddong
- Kim Hong-jib as Jong-pal

== Release ==
Mother competed in the Un Certain Regard category at the 2009 Cannes Film Festival. In South Korea, it attracted 3,003,785 admissions nationwide and grossed a total of US$16,283,879, becoming the 6th most-attended domestic film of 2009, and 10th overall. The film had its U.S. premiere in February 2010 as part of the Santa Barbara International Film Festival, and it received a limited U.S. theatrical release by Magnolia Pictures in March 2010. In March 2015, the film was re-released in the US at the Jacob Burns Film Center in Pleasantville, New York, as part of their Bong Joon Ho Retrospective (along with Memories of Murder, The Host, and Snowpiercer). A black-and-white version of the film was released in 2013.

The film was reported to have been made with a $5 million budget and went on to be the sixth highest-grossing film in South Korea in 2009.

=== Critical response ===
On review aggregator website Rotten Tomatoes, the film has an approval rating of 96% based on 114 reviews, with an average rating of 7.88/10. The site's critical consensus reads, "As fleshy as it is funny, Bong Joon-Ho's Mother straddles family drama, horror and comedy with a deft grasp of tone and plenty of eerie visuals." On Metacritic, which assigns a normalized rating to reviews, the film has a weighted average score of 79 out of 100 based on 31 critics, indicating "generally favorable reviews".

Manohla Dargis of The New York Times praised the performance by Kim Hye-ja and described the film as "alternately dazzling and frustrating".

Top ten lists

Mother appeared on many film critics' "best-of" lists of 2010.

- 2nd – Reverse Shot
- 2nd – Frank Paiva, MSN Movies
- 4th – Noel Murray, The A.V. Club
- 4th – Michael Atkinson, The Village Voice
- 4th – Jim Emerson, MSN Movies
- 5th – Slant Magazine
- 7th – Kim Morgan, MSN Movies
- 7th – Peter Hartlaub, San Francisco Chronicle
- 8th – Keith Philipps, The A.V. Club
- 8th – Scott Tobias, The A.V. Club
- 10th – Tasha Robinson, The A.V. Club
- 10th – Cahiers du cinéma
- Not ranked – Anthony Lane, The New Yorker
- Not ranked – Dana Stevens, Slant Magazine
- Not ranked – Joe Morgenstern, The Wall Street Journal

== Awards and nominations ==
The film was selected as South Korea's official submission for the Academy Award for Best Foreign Language Film at the 82nd Academy Awards.

Award	Category	Recipient	Result	Ref.
Buil Film Awards	Best Film	Mother	Won	
Buil Film Awards	Best Actress	Kim Hye-ja	Won	
Buil Film Awards	Best Cinematography	Hong Kyung-pyo	Won	
Buil Film Awards	Best Music	Lee Byung-woo	Won	
Busan Film Critics Awards	Best Film	Mother	Won	
Busan Film Critics Awards	Best Actress	Kim Hye-ja	Won	
Busan Film Critics Awards	Best Cinematography	Hong Kyung-pyo	Won	
Golden Rooster and Hundred Flowers Film Festival	Best Actress in a Foreign Film	Kim Hye-ja	Won	
Grand Bell Awards	Best Film	Mother	Nominated	
Grand Bell Awards	Best Director	Bong Joon Ho	Nominated	
Grand Bell Awards	Best Actress	Kim Hye-ja	Nominated	
Grand Bell Awards	Best Supporting Actor	Jin Goo	Won	
Grand Bell Awards	Best Cinematography	Hong Kyung-pyo	Nominated	
Grand Bell Awards	Best Music	Lee Byung-woo	Nominated	
Korean Association of Film Critics Awards	Best Film	Mother	Won	
Korean Association of Film Critics Awards	Best Actress	Kim Hye-ja	Won	
Korean Association of Film Critics Awards	Best Screenplay	Bong Joon Ho, Park Eun-kyo	Won	
Asia Pacific Screen Awards	Best Actress	Kim Hye-ja	Won	
Asia Pacific Screen Awards	Best Screenplay	Bong Joon Ho, Park Eun-kyo	Nominated	
Blue Dragon Film Awards	Best Film	Mother	Won	
Blue Dragon Film Awards	Best Director	Bong Joon Ho	Nominated	
Blue Dragon Film Awards	Best Actress	Kim Hye-ja	Nominated	
Blue Dragon Film Awards	Best Supporting Actor	Jin Goo	Won	
Blue Dragon Film Awards	Best Screenplay	Bong Joon Ho, Park Eun-kyo	Nominated	
Blue Dragon Film Awards	Best Cinematography	Hong Kyung-pyo	Nominated	
Blue Dragon Film Awards	Best Lighting	Choi Cheol-su, Park Dong-sun	Won	
Blue Dragon Film Awards	Best Music	Lee Byung-woo	Nominated	
Mar del Plata Film Festival	SIGNIS Award	Mother	Won	
Dubai International Film Festival	Best Film	Mother	Nominated	
Dubai International Film Festival	Best Screenplay	Bong Joon Ho, Park Eun-kyo	Won	
Chicago International Film Festival	Gold Hugo	Bong Joon Ho	Nominated	
Women in Film Korea Awards	Best Actress	Kim Hye-ja	Won	
Director's Cut Awards	Best Actress	Kim Hye-ja	Won	
Nikkan Sports Film Awards	Best Foreign Picture	Mother	Won	
KOFRA Film Awards	Best Film	Mother	Won	
KOFRA Film Awards	Best Actress	Kim Hye-ja	Won	
Santa Barbara International Film Festival	Best East Meets West Cinema Award	Mother	Won	
Independent Spirit Awards	Best International Film	Mother	Nominated	
Asian Film Awards	Best Film	Mother	Won	
Asian Film Awards	Best Director	Bong Joon Ho	Nominated	
Asian Film Awards	Best Actress	Kim Hye-ja	Won	
Asian Film Awards	Best Screenplay	Bong Joon Ho, Park Eun-kyo	Won	
Asian Film Awards	Best Supporting Actor	Won Bin	Nominated	
Asian Film Awards	Best Editing	Moon Sae-kyung	Nominated	
Baeksang Arts Awards	Best Film	Mother	Nominated	
Baeksang Arts Awards	Best Director	Bong Joon Ho	Nominated	
Baeksang Arts Awards	Best Screenplay	Bong Joon Ho, Park Eun-kyo	Nominated	
Baeksang Arts Awards	Best Actor	Won Bin	Nominated	
Baeksang Arts Awards	Best Actress	Kim Hye-ja	Nominated	
Green Planet Movie Awards	Best Foreign Culture Film of the Year	Mother	Won	
Green Planet Movie Awards	Best International Director	Bong Joon Ho	Won	
Green Planet Movie Awards	Best International Film	Mother	Won	
Green Planet Movie Awards	Best International Drama (Asia)	Mother	Won	
Boston Society of Film Critics Awards	Best Foreign Language Film	Mother	Won	
Toronto Film Critics Association Awards	Best Foreign Language Film	Mother	Runner-up	
Houston Film Critics Society	Best Foreign Language Film	Mother	Nominated	
Los Angeles Film Critics Association Awards	Best Actress	Kim Hye-ja	Won	
Los Angeles Film Critics Association Awards	Best Foreign Language Film	Mother	Runner-up	
Chicago Film Critics Association	Best Foreign Language Film	Mother	Nominated	
Online Film Critics Society Awards	Best Foreign Language Film	Mother	Won	
Online Film Critics Society Awards	Best Actress	Kim Hye-ja	Won	
San Francisco Film Critics Circle Awards	Best Foreign Language Film	Mother	Won	
Dallas–Fort Worth Film Critics Association	Best Foreign Language Film	Mother	Nominated	
San Diego Film Critics Society	Best Foreign Language Film	Mother	Nominated	
Satellite Awards	Best Foreign Language Film	Mother	Nominated	
Southeastern Film Critics Association Awards	Best Foreign Language Film	Mother	Won	
Washington D.C. Area Film Critics Association	Best Foreign Language Film	Mother	Nominated	
Women Film Critics Circle	Best Foreign Film by or About Women	Mother	Won	
IndieWire Critics Poll	Best Film	Mother	8th place	
IndieWire Critics Poll	Best Actress	Kim Hye-ja	5th place	
IndieWire Critics Poll	Best Screenplay	Bong Joon Ho, Park Eun-kyo	5th place	
Village Voice Film Poll	Best Film	Mother	8th place	
Village Voice Film Poll	Best Actress	Kim Hye-ja	3rd place	
Munich International Film festival	Best International Film (ARRI/OSRAM Award)	Mother	Won	
Munich International Film festival	Best International Film (Arri-Zeiss-Award)	Mother	Won	
Saturn Awards	Best International Film	Mother	Nominated	
Kansas City Film Critics Circle Awards	Best Foreign Language Film	Mother	Won	
Belgian Syndicate of Cinema Critics	Grand Prix	Mother	Nominated	
Chlotrudis Awards	Best Movie	Mother	Nominated	
Chlotrudis Awards	Best Director	Bong Joon Ho	Nominated	
Chlotrudis Awards	Best Actress	Kim Hye-ja	Won	
Chlotrudis Awards	Best Original Screenplay	Bong Joon Ho, Park Eun-kyo	Won	
Alliance of Women Film Journalists	Best Non-English Language Film	Mother	Nominated	
Alliance of Women Film Journalists	Cultural Crossover Award	Mother	Nominated	
Central Ohio Film Critics Association	Best Foreign Language Film	Mother	Won	
Denver Film Critics Society	Best Foreign Language Film	Mother	Won	
Gold Derby Awards	Best Foreign Language Film	Mother	Nominated	
Vancouver Film Critics Circle	Best Foreign Language Film	Mother	Nominated	
International Cinephile Society	Best Film Not in the English Language	Mother	7th place	
International Online Cinema Awards (INOCA)	Best Non-English Language Film	Mother	Nominated	
NAACP Image Awards	Outstanding Foreign Motion Picture	Mother	Nominated	

== See also ==
- List of submissions to the 82nd Academy Awards for Best Foreign Language Film
- List of South Korean submissions for the Academy Award for Best International Feature Film
