= Baeksang Arts Award Grand Prize – Television =

South Korean annual television award

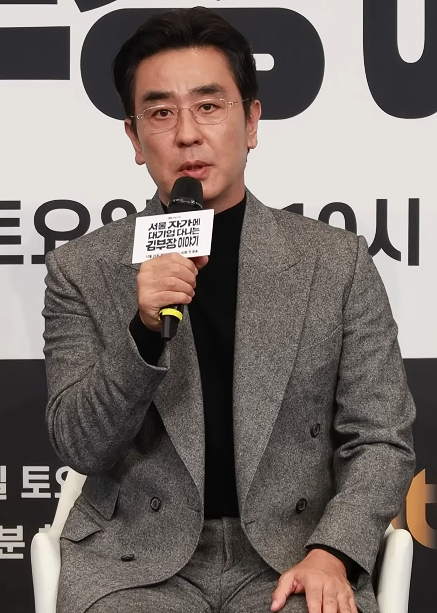
- 2026 recipient: Ryu Seung-ryong
- Country: South Korea
- Presented by: Baeksang Arts Awards
- Most recent winner: Ryu Seung-ryong; The Dream Life of Mr. Kim (2026)
- Website: baeksangartsawards

The Baeksang Arts Award Grand Prize – Television (Korean: 백상예술대상 TV부문 대상; RR: Baeksang Yesul Daesang TV Bumun Daesang) is an award presented annually at the Baeksang Arts Awards ceremony organised by Ilgan Sports and JTBC Plus, affiliates of JoongAng Ilbo, usually in the second quarter of each year in Seoul. It is considered the highest honor in the television division of the ceremony. The candidates are chosen from the list of nominees in the television division each year and are not announced before the ceremony.

== Multiple wins ==
Wins	Winner
4	Kim Hye-ja (actress)
2	Kim Hee-ae (actress)
2	Yoo Jae-suk (variety performer)

== List of winners ==
Table key
‡	Indicates the winner

Year	Winner and nominees	Program	Original title	Network
1979 (15th)	Kim Young-ok (actress) ‡	I Sell Happiness	행복을 팝니다	MBC
1979 (15th)	Jung Hye-sun (actress) ‡	I Sell Happiness	행복을 팝니다	MBC
1979 (15th)	Kim Hye-ja (actress) ‡	I Sell Happiness	행복을 팝니다	MBC
1980 (16th)	Kim Min-ja (actress) ‡	A Lonely Affair	고독한 관계	TBC
1981 (17th)		Eulhwa ‡	을화	KBS
1982 (18th)		A Life-sized Buddha ‡	등신불	KBS
1983 (19th)		Winds of Change ‡	풍운	KBS
1984 (20th)		New Tale of the Five Kingdoms of India ‡	신왕오천축국전	KBS
1985 (21st)		Korea's Butterflies ‡	한국의 나비	MBC
1986 (22nd)	Shin Bong-seung (screenwriter) ‡	500 Years of Joseon Dynasty	조선왕조 오백년	MBC
1987 (23rd)		The Boil ‡	생인손	MBC
1988 (24th)		Love and Ambition ‡	사랑과 야망	MBC
1989 (25th)	Kim Hye-ja (actress) ‡	Winter Mist	겨울안개	MBC
1989 (25th)	Kim Hye-ja (actress) ‡	Sand Castle	모래성	MBC
1990 (26th)		Peace, the Arduous Way to Go ‡	평화, 멀지만 가야할 길	MBC
1990 (26th)		The Tree Blooming with Love ‡	사랑이 꽃피는 나무	KBS
1991 (27th)		The Second Republic ‡	제2공화국	MBC
1992 (28th)		Eyes of Dawn ‡	여명의 눈동자	MBC
1993 (29th)	Kim Hee-ae (actress) ‡	Sons and Daughters	아들과 딸	MBC
1993 (29th)	Go Doo-shim (actress) ‡	My Husband's Woman	남편의 여자	KBS
1994 (30th)	Park Chul (PD) ‡	My Mother's Sea	엄마의 바다	MBC
1995 (31st)		Sandglass ‡	모래시계	SBS
1996 (32nd)		Korea's Reptiles ‡	한국의 파충류	EBS
1997 (33rd)		The Most Beautiful Goodbye ‡	세상에서 가장 아름다운 이별	MBC
1998 (34th)	Lee Jang-soo (PD) ‡	Offspring (Saekki)	새끼	SBS
1999 (35th)	Jang Soo-bong (director) ‡	When Time Flows	흐르는 것이 세월뿐이랴	MBC
2000 (36th)		Kuk-hee ‡	국희	MBC
2001 (37th)	Kim Soo-hyun (screenwriter) ‡	The Aspen Tree	은사시나무	SBS
2002 (38th)		Emperor Wang Gun ‡	태조 왕건	KBS
2003 (39th)		All In ‡	올인	SBS
2004 (40th)	Kim Hee-ae (actress) ‡	Perfect Love	완전한 사랑	SBS
2005 (41st)		Lovers in Paris ‡	파리의 연인	SBS
2006 (42nd)		My Lovely Sam Soon ‡	내 이름은 김삼순	MBC
2007 (43rd)		Jumong ‡	주몽	MBC
2008 (44th)	Kang Ho-dong (variety performer) ‡	1 Night 2 Days	해피선데이	KBS
2009 (45th)	Kim Hye-ja (actress) ‡	Mom's Dead Upset	엄마가 뿔났다	KBS
2010 (46th)	Go Hyun-jung (actress) ‡	Queen Seondeok	선덕여왕	MBC
2011 (47th)	Hyun Bin (actor) ‡	Secret Garden	시크릿 가든	SBS
2012 (48th)		Deep Rooted Tree ‡	뿌리깊은 나무	SBS
2013 (49th)	Yoo Jae-suk (variety performer) ‡	Infinite Challenge	무한도전	MBC
2014 (50th)	Jun Ji-hyun (actress) ‡	My Love from the Star	별에서 온 그대	SBS
2015 (51st)	Na Young-seok (PD) ‡	Grandpas Over Flowers	꽃보다 할배	tvN
2015 (51st)	Na Young-seok (PD) ‡	Three Meals a Day	삼시세끼	tvN
2016 (52nd)		Descendants of the Sun ‡	태양의 후예	KBS
2017 (53rd)	Kim Eun-sook (screenwriter) ‡	Guardian: The Lonely and Great God	쓸쓸하고 찬란하神 - 도깨비	tvN
2018 (54th)		Stranger ‡	비밀의 숲	tvN
2018 (54th)	Cho Seung-woo (actor)	Stranger	비밀의 숲	tvN
2019 (55th)	Kim Hye-ja (actress) ‡	The Light in Your Eyes	눈이 부시게	JTBC
2020 (56th)		When the Camellia Blooms ‡	동백꽃 필 무렵	KBS
2020 (56th)		Mister Trot	내일은 미스터트롯	TV Chosun
2020 (56th)	Kim Hee-ae (actress)	The World of the Married	부부의 세계	JTBC
2021 (57th)	Yoo Jae-suk (variety performer) ‡			
2021 (57th)		Beyond Evil	괴물	JTBC
2022 (58th)		Squid Game ‡	오징어 게임	Netflix
2023 (59th)	Park Eun-bin (actress) ‡	Extraordinary Attorney Woo	이상한 변호사 우영우	ENA
2023 (59th)		Extraordinary Attorney Woo	이상한 변호사 우영우	ENA
2023 (59th)	Lee Sung-min (actor)	Reborn Rich	재벌집 막내아들	JTBC
2023 (59th)	Kim Eun-sook (screenwriter)	The Glory	더 글로리	Netflix
2023 (59th)		The Glory	더 글로리	Netflix
2024 (60th)		Moving ‡	무빙	Disney+
2024 (60th)	Kim Dong-shik, Im Wan-ho (Cinematography)	Whales and I	고래와 나	SBS
2024 (60th)	Yoo Jae-suk			
2025 (61st)		Culinary Class Wars ‡	흑백요리사: 요리 계급 전쟁	Netflix
2026 (62nd)	Ryu Seung-ryong (actor) ‡	The Dream Life of Mr. Kim	서울 자가에 대기업 다니는 김 부장 이야기	JTBC

== Sources ==
- "Baeksang Arts Awards Nominees and Winners Lists". Naver Movie (in Korean).
- "Baeksang Arts Awards Winners Lists". Baeksang Arts Awards (in Korean).
