= 55th Baeksang Arts Awards =

2019 edition of award ceremony

- Date: May 1, 2019
- Site: Hall D, COEX, Seoul
- Hosted by: Shin Dong-yup; Bae Suzy; Park Bo-gum
- Organised by: Ilgan Sports; JTBC Plus

Highlights
- Most wins: Film: Miss Baek (2); Television: Sky Castle (4)
- Most nominations: Film: Believer & Burning (6); Television: Mr. Sunshine & Sky Castle (9)
- Grand Prize – Film: Jung Woo-sung (actor) – Innocent Witness
- Grand Prize – TV: Kim Hye-ja (actress) – The Light in Your Eyes
- Website: baeksangartsawards

Television/radio coverage
- Network: JTBC
- Viewership: 2.5% (Nielsen Korea)

The 55th Baeksang Arts Awards (Korean: 제55회 백상예술대상) ceremony, organised by Ilgan Sports and JTBC Plus, took place on May 1, 2019, at Hall D, COEX, Seoul, beginning at 9:00 p.m. KST. It was hosted by Shin Dong-yup, Bae Suzy and Park Bo-gum for the second consecutive year and was broadcast live on JTBC. One of South Korea's major awards shows, the annual awards ceremony recognizes excellence in film and television.

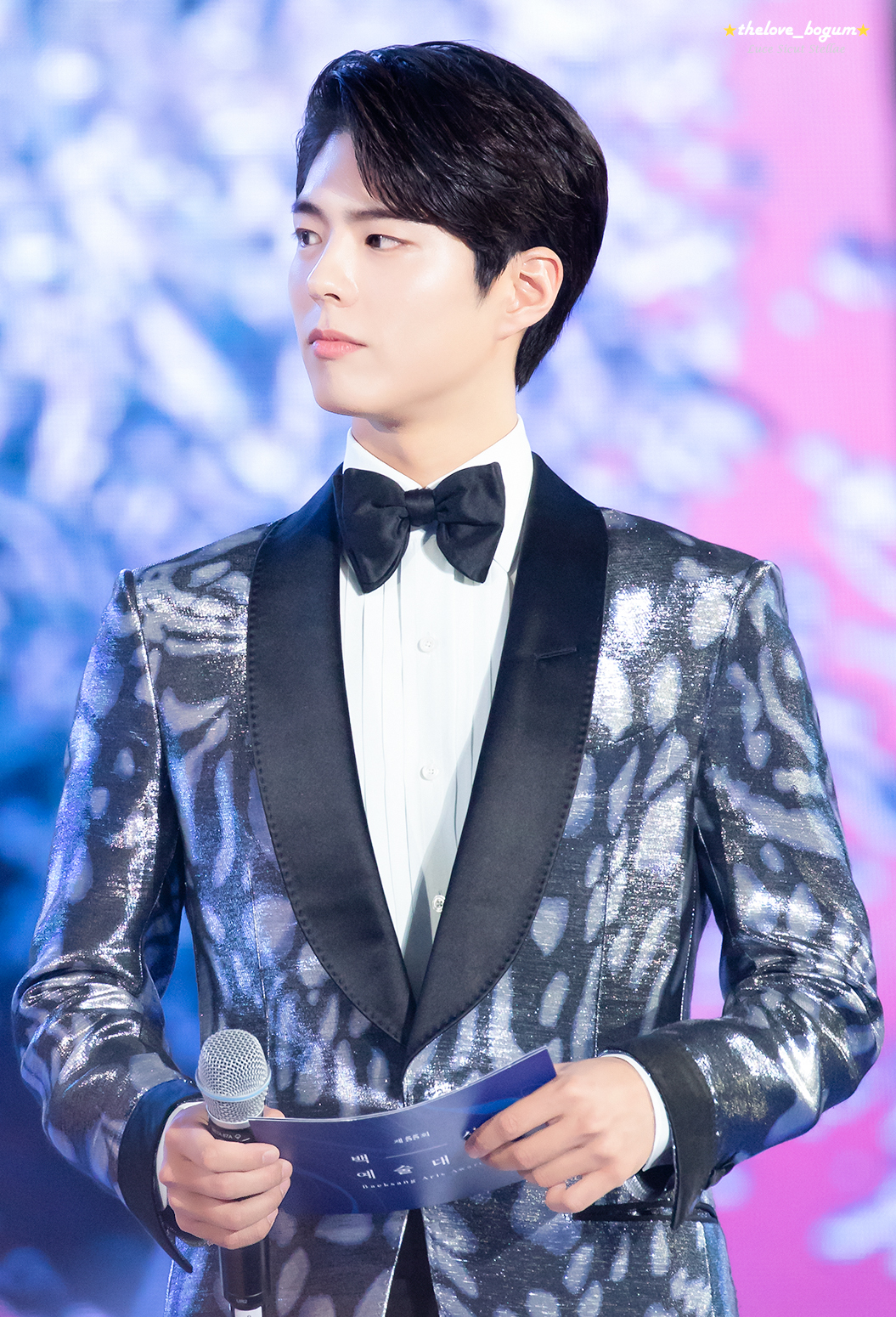
Host Park Bo-gum

The highest honors of the night, Grand Prize (Daesang), were awarded to actor Jung Woo-sung of Innocent Witness in the film division and actress Kim Hye-ja of The Light in Your Eyes in the television division.

== Winners and nominees ==
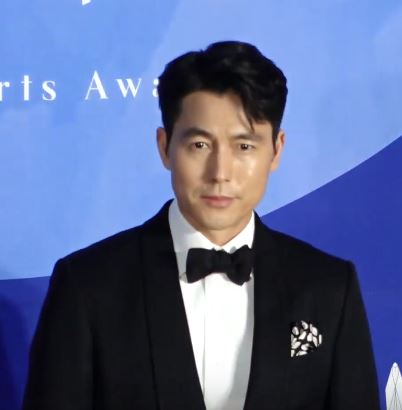
Jung Woo-sung, Grand Prize – Film winner

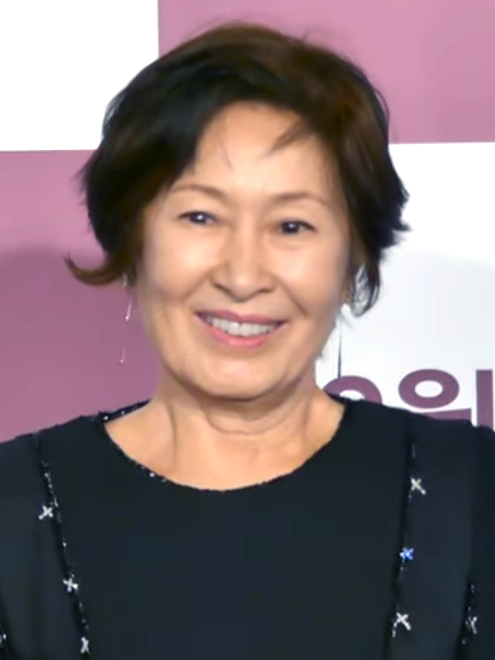
Kim Hye-ja, Grand Prize – Television winner

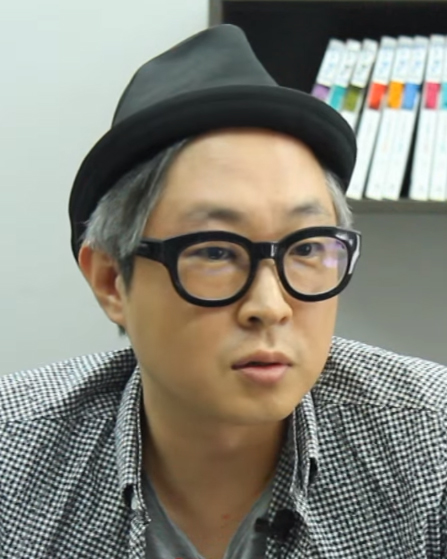
Kang Hyeong-cheol, Best Director – Film winner

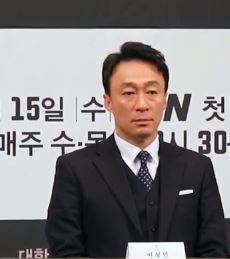
Lee Sung-min, Best Actor – Film winner

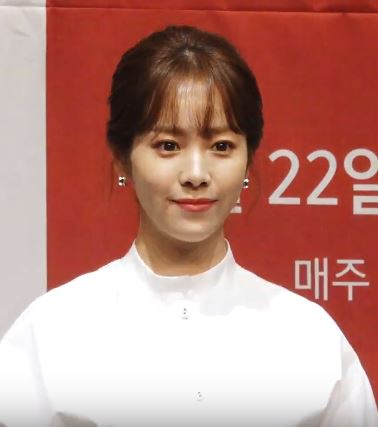
Han Ji-min, Best Actress – Film winner

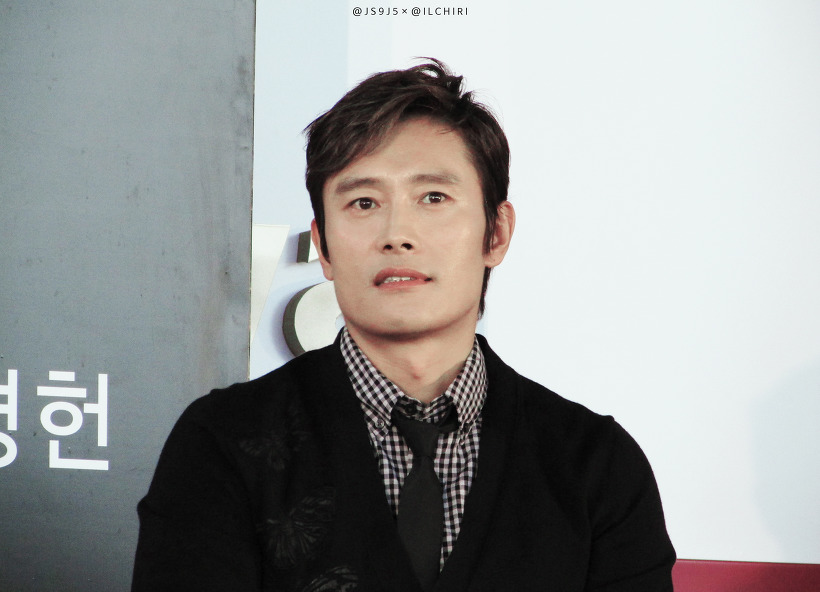
Lee Byung-hun, Best Actor – Television winner

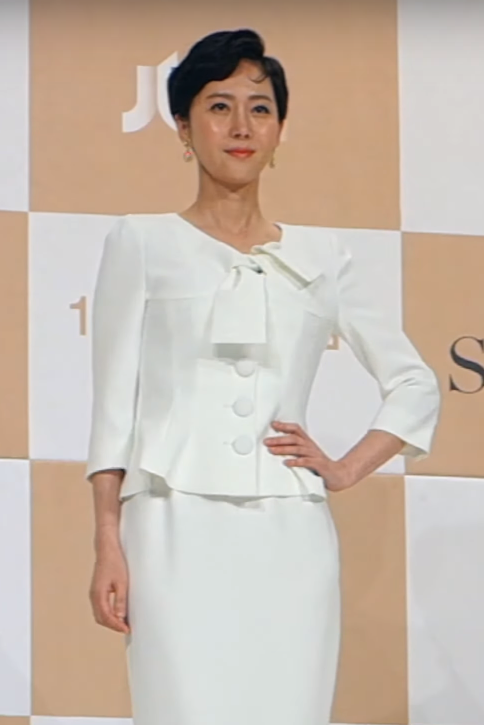
Yum Jung-ah, Best Actress – Television winner

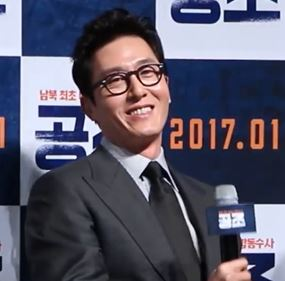
Kim Joo-hyuk, Best Supporting Actor – Film winner

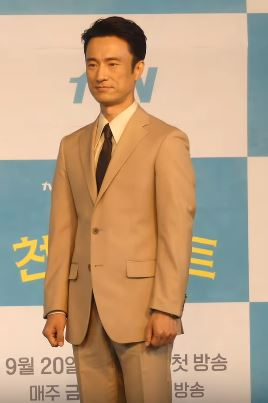
Kim Byung-chul, Best Supporting Actor – Television winner

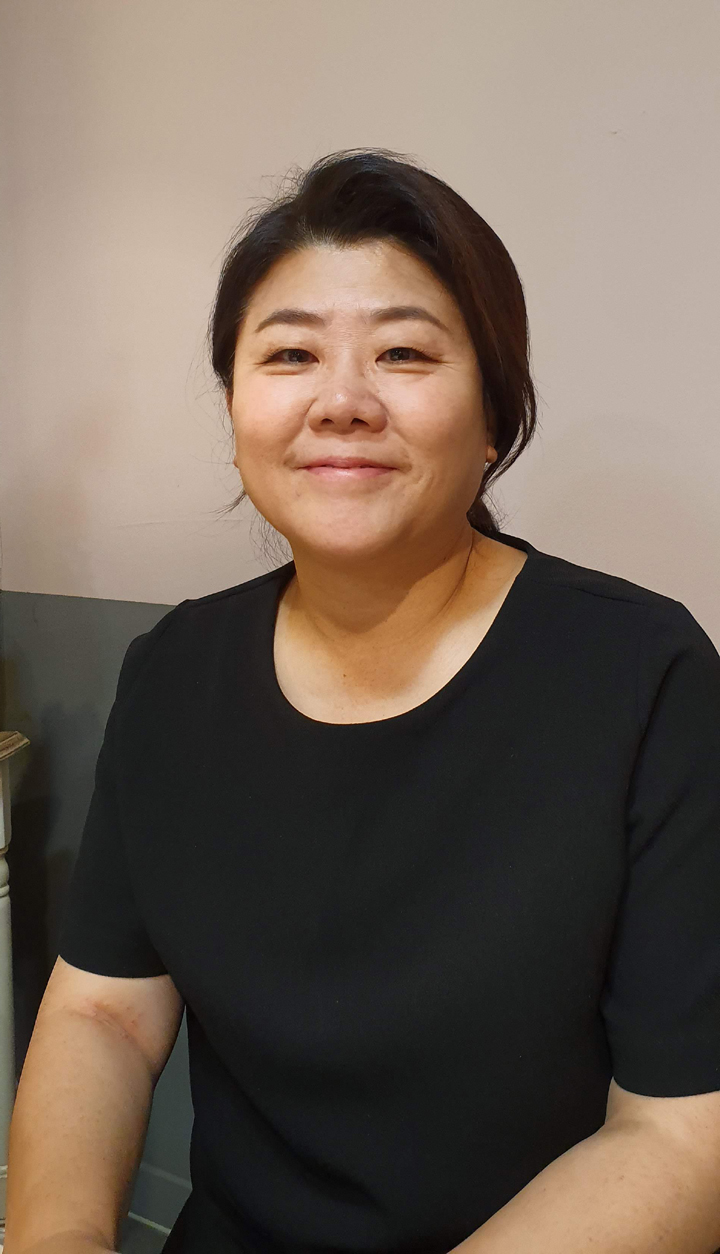
Lee Jung-eun, Best Supporting Actress – Television winner

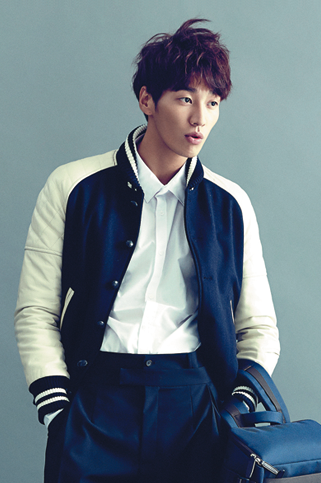
Kim Young-kwang, Best New Actor – Film winner

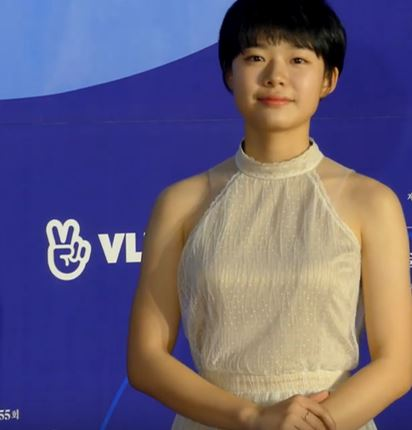
Lee Jae-in, Best New Actress – Film winner

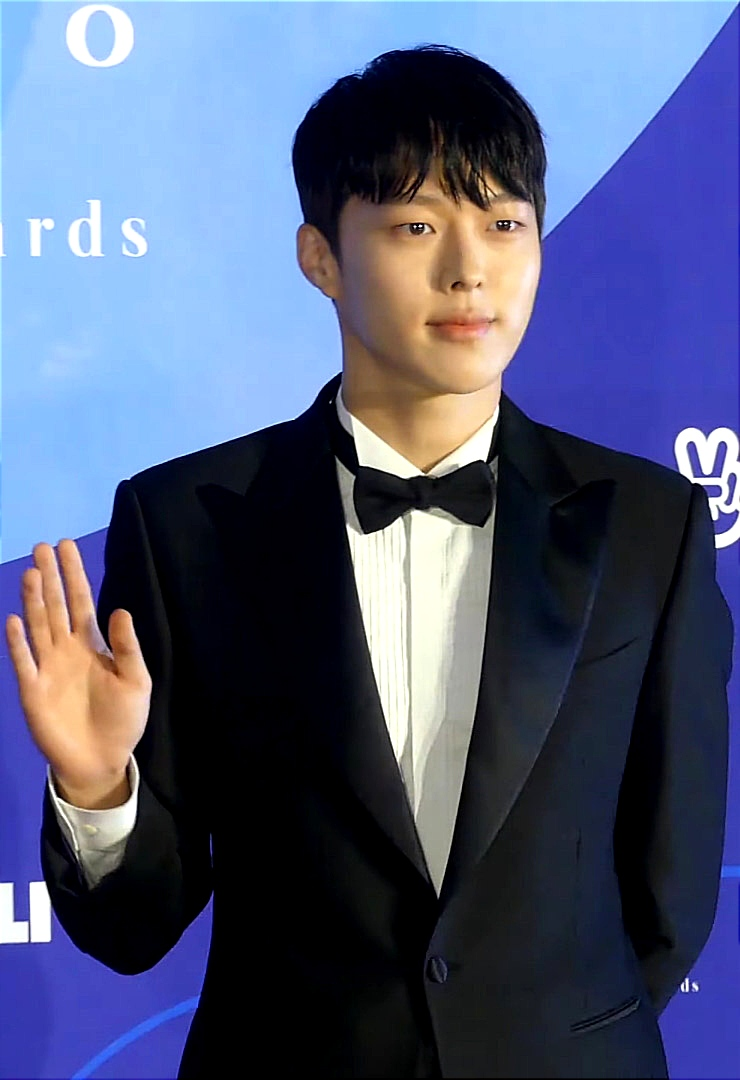
Jang Ki-yong, Best New Actor – Television winner

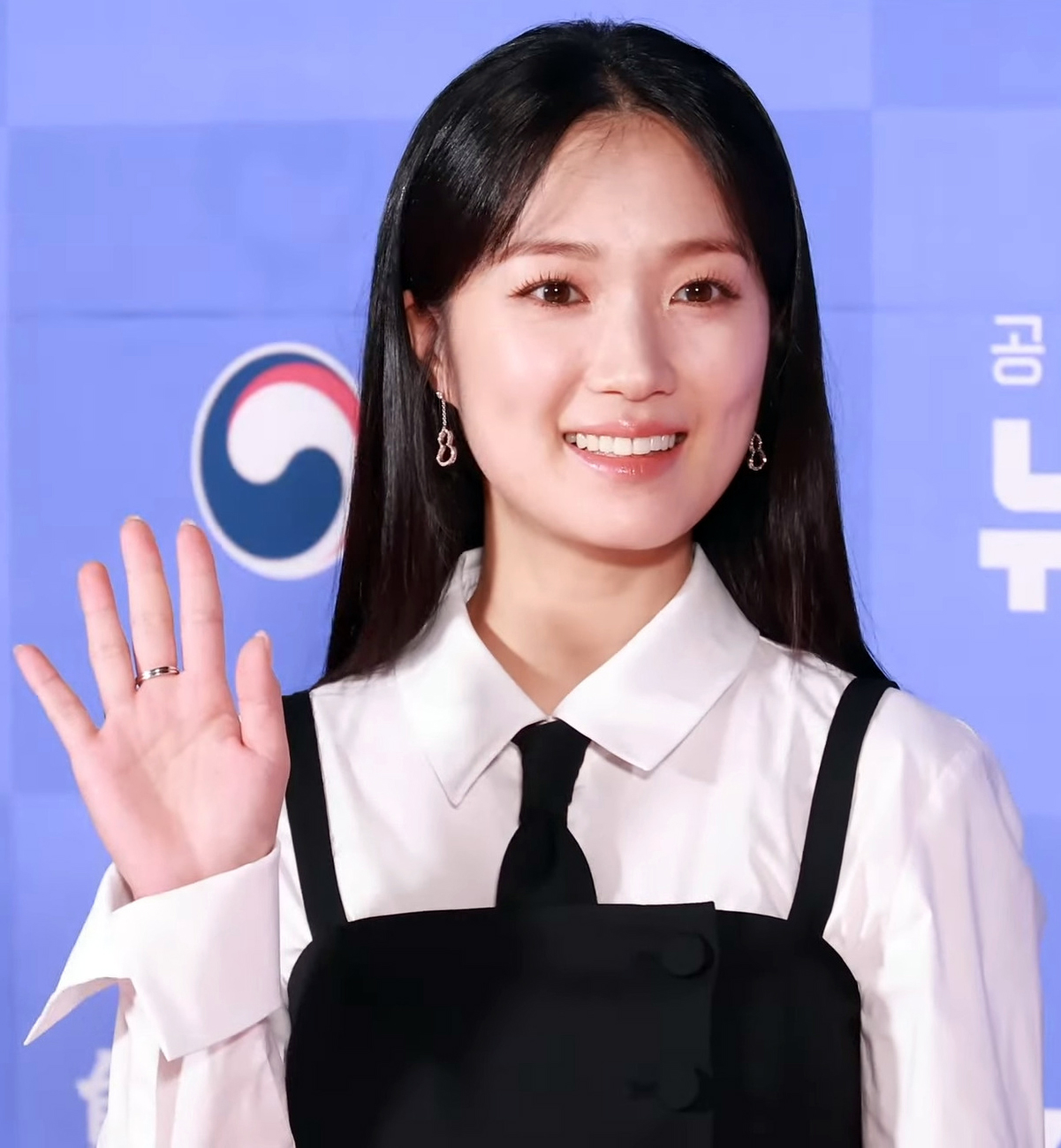
Kim Hye-yoon, Best New Actress – Television winner

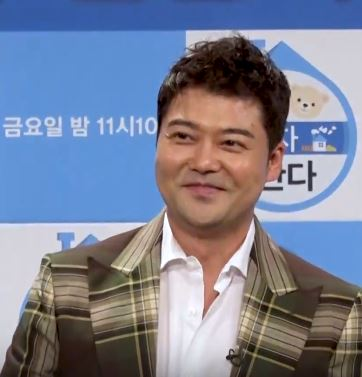
Jun Hyun-moo, Best Male Variety Performer winner

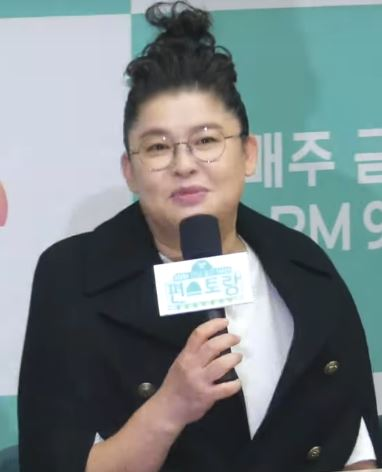
Lee Young-ja, Best Female Variety Performer winner

- Winners are listed first, highlighted in **boldface**, and indicated with a double dagger (‡).
  - Nominees

=== Film ===
**Grand Prize**	**Best Film**
**Jung Woo-sung (actor) – Innocent Witness ‡**	**The Spy Gone North ‡**; Miss Baek; Burning; Svaha: The Sixth Finger; Dark Figure of Crime
**Best Director**	**Best New Director**
**Kang Hyeong-cheol – Swing Kids ‡**; Yoon Jong-bin – The Spy Gone North; Lee Chang-dong – Burning; Lee Hae-young – Believer; Jang Jae-hyun – Svaha: The Sixth Finger	**Lee Ji-won – Miss Baek ‡**; Kim Ui-seok – After My Death; Shin Dong-Seok – Last Child; Lee Seok-geun – On Your Wedding Day; Lee Jong-eon – Birthday
**Best Actor**	**Best Actress**
**Lee Sung-min – The Spy Gone North as Ri Myung-woon ‡**; Ryu Seung-ryong – Extreme Job as Chief Go; Yoo Ah-in – Burning as Lee Jong-su; Jung Woo-sung – Innocent Witness as Yang Soon-ho; Ju Ji-hoon – Dark Figure of Crime as Kang Tae-oh	**Han Ji-min – Miss Baek as Baek Sang-ah ‡**; Go Ah-sung – A Resistance as Yu Gwan-sun; Kim Hyang-gi – Innocent Witness as Ji-woo; Kim Hye-soo – Default as Han Shi-hyeon; Kim Hee-ae – Herstory as Moon Jung-sook
**Best Supporting Actor**	**Best Supporting Actress**
**Kim Joo-hyuk – Believer as Jin Ha-rim ‡**; Park Hae-joon – Believer as Seon-chang; Steven Yeun – Burning as Ben; Jo Woo-jin – The Drug King as Jo Seong-kang; Jin Seon-kyu – Extreme Job as Detective Ma	**Kwon So-hyun – Miss Baek as Joo Mi-kyung ‡**; Yum Hye-ran – Innocent Witness as Mi-ran; Lee Hanee – Extreme Job as Detective Jang; Jo Min-su – The Witch: Part 1. The Subversion as Dr. Baek; Jin Seo-yeon – Believer as Bo-ryeong
**Best New Actor**	**Best New Actress**
**Kim Young-kwang – On Your Wedding Day as Hwang Woo-yeon ‡**; Gong Myung – Extreme Job as Detective Jae-hoon; Kim Min-Ho – Swing Kids as Xiao Pang; Nam Joo-hyuk – The Great Battle as Sa-mul; Son Suk-ku – Hit-and-Run Squad as Ki Tae-ho	**Lee Jae-in – Svaha: The Sixth Finger as Geum-hwa ‡**; Kim Da-mi – The Witch: Part 1. The Subversion as Ja-yoon; Lee Joo-young – Believer as Joo-yeong; Jeon Yeo-been – After My Death as Young‑hee; Jeon Jong-seo – Burning as Shin Hae-mi
**Best Screenplay**	**Technical Award**
**Kwak Kyung-taek, Kim Tae-kyun – Dark Figure of Crime ‡**; Kwon Sung-hwi, Yoon Jong-bin – The Spy Gone North; Lee Han, Moon Ji-won – Innocent Witness; Bae Se-young – Extreme Job; Lee Ji-won – Miss Baek	**Hong Kyung-pyo (Filming) – Burning ‡**; Kim Jun-seok (Music) – Swing Kids; Park Il-hyun (Art) – The Spy Gone North; Yang Jin-mo (Editing) – Believer; Jin Jong-hyun (VFX) – Along with the Gods: The Last 49 Days

==== Films with multiple awards ====
The following films received multiple awards:

Wins	Films
3	Miss Baek
2	The Spy Gone North

==== Films with multiple nominations ====
The following films received multiple nominations:

Nominations	Films
6	Believer
6	Burning
5	Extreme Job
5	Miss Baek
5	The Spy Gone North
4	Innocent Witness
3	Dark Figure of Crime
3	Svaha: The Sixth Finger
3	Swing Kids
2	After My Death
2	The Witch: Part 1. The Subversion
2	On Your Wedding Day

=== Television ===
**Grand Prize**
**Kim Hye-ja (actress) – The Light in Your Eyes ‡**
**Best Drama**	**Best Director**
**My Mister (tvN) ‡**; The Light in Your Eyes (JTBC); Mr. Sunshine (tvN); Children of Nobody (MBC); Sky Castle (JTBC)	**Jo Hyun-tak – Sky Castle ‡**; Kim Suk-yoon – The Light in Your Eyes; Kim Won-seok – My Mister; Ahn Gil-ho – Memories of the Alhambra; Lee Eung-bok – Mr. Sunshine
**Best Entertainment Program**	**Best Educational Show**
**Omniscient Interfering View (MBC) ‡**; Baek Jong-won's Alley Restaurant (SBS); I Live Alone (MBC); Welcome, First Time in Korea? (MBC); Comedy Big League (tvN)	**Journalism Talk Show J (KBS) ‡**; Feast on the Road (KBS); Lee Kyu-yeon's Spotlight – 5.18 Secret Agent (JTBC); Seoul Olympics 30-Year Anniversary Special Documentary 88/18 (KBS); PD Note – The Late Jang Ja Yeon (MBC)
**Best Actor**	**Best Actress**
**Lee Byung-hun – Mr. Sunshine as Choi Yoo-jin / Eugene Choi ‡**; Kim Nam-gil – The Fiery Priest as Kim Hae-il; Yeo Jin-goo – The Crowned Clown as Ha-seon, the clown / Yi Heon, the King; Lee Sun-kyun – My Mister as Park Dong-hoon; Hyun Bin – Memories of the Alhambra as Yoo Jin-woo	**Yum Jung-ah – Sky Castle as Han Seo-jin / Kwak Mi-hyang ‡**; Kim Seo-hyung – Sky Castle as Kim Joo-young; Kim Tae-ri – Mr. Sunshine as Go Ae-shin; Kim Hye-ja – The Light in Your Eyes as Kim Hye-ja; Lee Ji-eun – My Mister as Lee Ji-an
**Best Supporting Actor**	**Best Supporting Actress**
**Kim Byung-chul – Sky Castle as Cha Min-hyuk ‡**; Kim Sang-kyung – The Crowned Clown as Yi Kyu (a.k.a. Haksan); Bae Seong-woo – Live as Oh Yang-chon; Son Ho-jun – The Light in Your Eyes as Kim Young-soo; Yoo Yeon-seok – Mr. Sunshine as Goo Dong-mae / Ishida Sho	**Lee Jung-eun – The Light in Your Eyes as Moon Jung-eun ‡**; Kim Min-jung – Mr. Sunshine as Lee Yang-hwa / Kudo Hina; Oh Na-ra – My Mister as Jung Jung-hee; Yoon Se-ah – Sky Castle as No Seung-hye; Lee Da-hee – The Beauty Inside as Kang Sa-ra
**Best New Actor**	**Best New Actress**
**Jang Ki-yong – Come and Hug Me as Chae Do-jin ‡**; Park Sung-hoon – My Only One as Jang Go-rae; Park Hoon – Memories of the Alhambra as Cha Hyung-seok; Son Suk-ku – Matrimonial Chaos as Lee Jang-hyun; Wi Ha-joon – Romance Is a Bonus Book as Ji Seo-joon	**Kim Hye-yoon – Sky Castle as Kang Ye-seo ‡**; Kwon Nara – My Mister as Choi Yoo-ra; Park Se-wan – Just Dance as Kim Shi-eun; Seol In-ah – Sunny Again Tomorrow as Kang Ha-nee; Lee Seol – Less Than Evil as Eun Sun-jae
**Best Male Variety Performer**	**Best Female Variety Performer**
**Jun Hyun-moo – I Live Alone ‡**; Moon Se-yoon – Tasty Guys; Shin Dong-yup – My Little Old Boy; Yang Se-hyung – Master in the House; Yoo Byung-jae – Omniscient Interfering View	**Lee Young-ja – Omniscient Interfering View ‡**; Kim Min-kyung – Tasty Guys; Kim Sook – Food Bless You; Park Na-rae – I Live Alone; Jang Do-yeon – Comedy Big League
**Best Screenplay**	**Technical Award**
**Park Hae-young – My Mister ‡**; Lee Nam-kyu, Kim Soo-jin – The Light in Your Eyes; Kim Eun-sook – Mr. Sunshine; Do Hyun-jung – Children of Nobody; Yoo Hyun-mi – Sky Castle	**Park Sung-jin (VFX) – Memories of the Alhambra ‡**; Kim So-yeon (Art) – Mr. Sunshine; Kim Yong, Jeon Joon-woo (Filming) – May, The Origins of Civilization; Oh Jae-ho (Filming) – Sky Castle; Lee Yong-seob (VFX) – Mr. Sunshine

==== Programs with multiple awards ====
The following television programs received multiple awards:

Wins	Television programs
4	Sky Castle
2	The Light in Your Eyes
2	My Mister
2	Omniscient Interfering View

==== Programs with multiple nominations ====
The following television programs received multiple nominations:

Nominations	Television programs
9	Mr. Sunshine
9	Sky Castle
7	My Mister
6	The Light in Your Eyes
4	Memories of the Alhambra
3	Omniscient Interfering View
3	I Live Alone
2	Children of Nobody
2	The Crowned Clown
2	Comedy Big League
2	Tasty Guys

=== Special awards ===
Awards	Recipient
**Best Short Play – Theatre**	Sung Soo-yeon; Actress-1: National Robot Actress 1
**V Live Popularity Award (Male)**	Do Kyung-soo
**V Live Popularity Award (Female)**	Lee Ji-eun
**Bazaar Icon Award**	Kim Hye-soo

== Performers ==
Performers listed in the order of appearance.

Name	Role	Performed
Ryu Jun-yeol	Performer	Monologue (Speech on 100 years of Korean Cinema)
Jannabi	Performer	"봉우리" (transl. Peaks) by Kim Min-ki
