= 2010 Los Angeles Film Critics Association Awards =

Annual US film awards ceremony

36th LAFCA Awards
- Date: December 12, 2010

Highlights
- Best Picture: The Social Network

The 36th Los Angeles Film Critics Association Awards, given by the Los Angeles Film Critics Association (LAFCA), honored the best in film for 2010.

== Winners ==
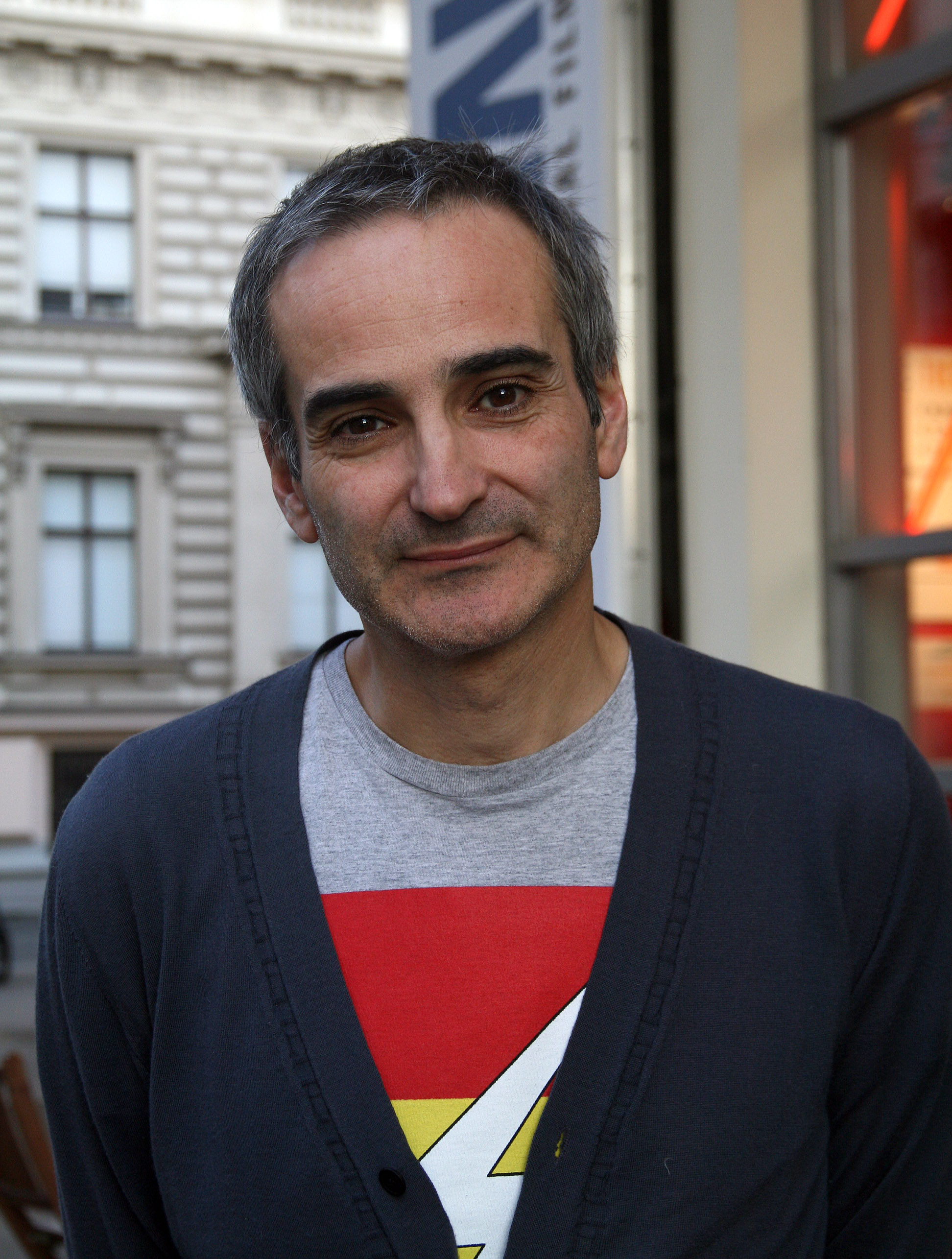
Olivier Assayas, Best Director co-winner

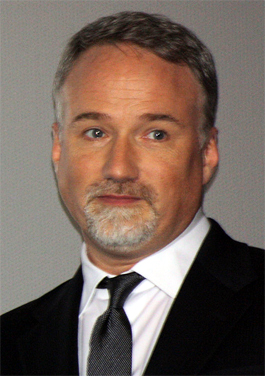
David Fincher, Best Director co-winner

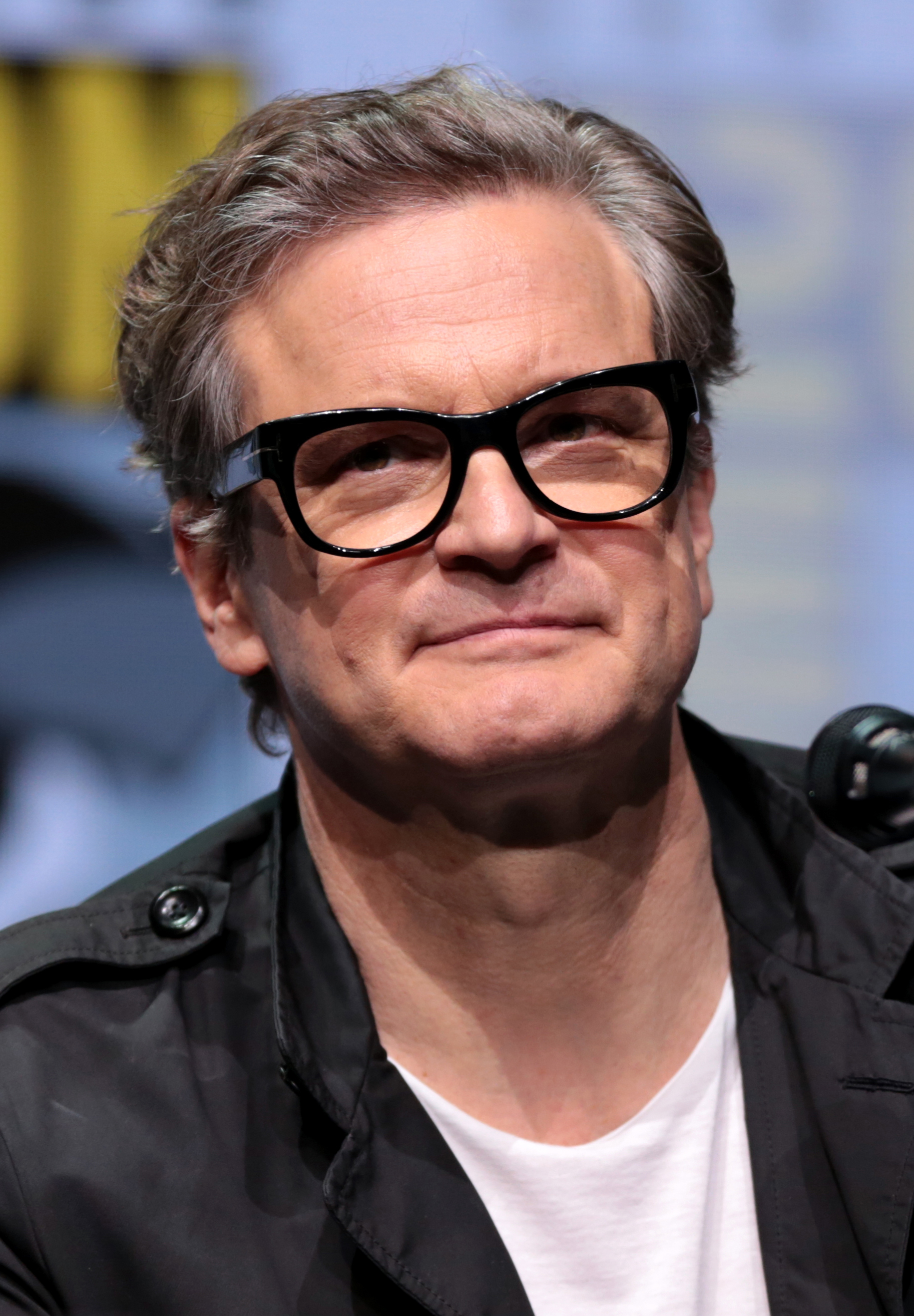
Colin Firth, Best Actor winner

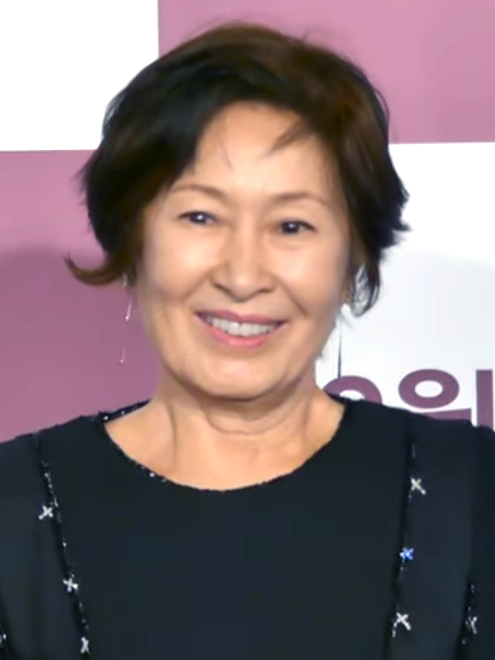
Kim Hye-ja, Best Actress winner

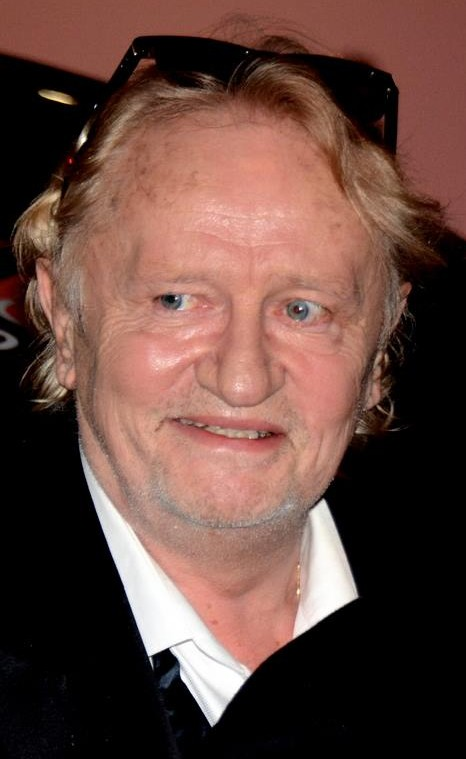
Niels Arestrup, Best Supporting Actor winner

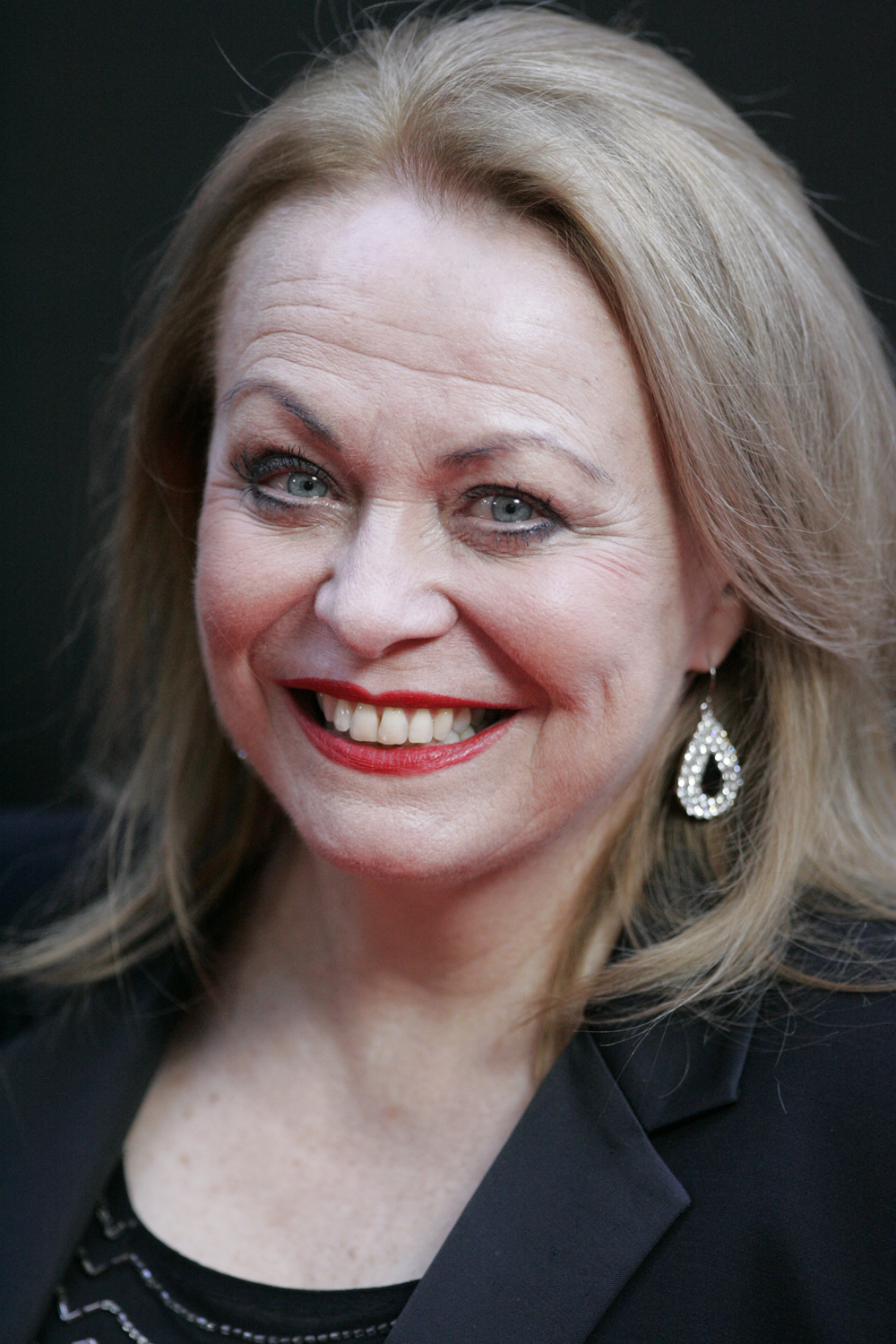
Jacki Weaver, Best Supporting Actress winner

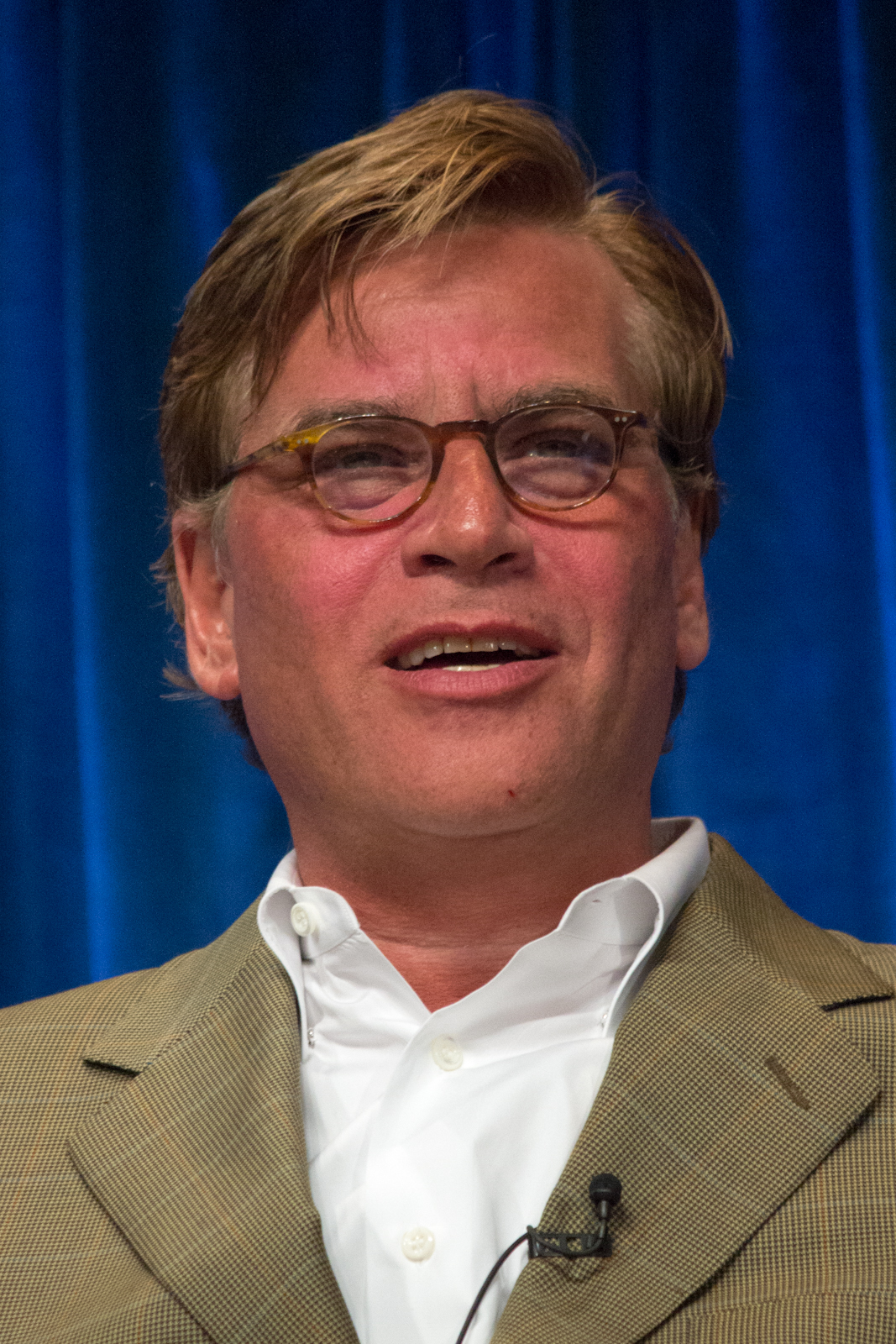
Aaron Sorkin, Best Screenplay winner

- Best Picture:
  - The Social Network
  - Runner-up: Carlos
- Best Director (TIE):
  - Olivier Assayas – Carlos
  - David Fincher – The Social Network
- Best Actor:
  - Colin Firth – The King's Speech
  - Runner-up: Édgar Ramírez – Carlos
- Best Actress:
  - Kim Hye-ja – Mother (Madeo)
  - Runner-up: Jennifer Lawrence – Winter's Bone
- Best Supporting Actor:
  - Niels Arestrup – A Prophet (Un prophète)
  - Runner-up: Geoffrey Rush – The King's Speech
- Best Supporting Actress:
  - Jacki Weaver – Animal Kingdom
  - Runner-up: Olivia Williams – The Ghost Writer
- Best Screenplay:
  - Aaron Sorkin – The Social Network
  - Runner-up: David Seidler – The King's Speech
- Best Cinematography:
  - Matthew Libatique – Black Swan
  - Runner-up: Roger Deakins – True Grit
- Best Production Design:
  - Guy Hendrix Dyas – Inception
  - Runner-up: Eve Stewart – The King's Speech
- Best Music Score (TIE):
  - Alexandre Desplat – The Ghost Writer
  - Trent Reznor and Atticus Ross – The Social Network
- Best Foreign Language Film:
  - Carlos • France/Germany
  - Runner-up: Mother (Madeo) • South Korea
- Best Documentary/Non-Fiction Film:
  - Last Train Home
  - Runner-up: Exit Through the Gift Shop
- Best Animation:
  - Toy Story 3
  - Runner-up: The Illusionist (L'illusionniste)
- New Generation Award:
  - Lena Dunham – Tiny Furniture
- Career Achievement Award:
  - Paul Mazursky
- The Douglas Edwards Experimental/Independent Film/Video Award:
  - Jean-Luc Godard – Film Socialisme
- Legacy of Cinema Awards:
  - Serge Bromberg for Henri-Georges Clouzot's Inferno (L'enfer d'Henri-Georges Clouzot)
  - The F. W. Murnau Foundation and Fernando Pena for the restoration of Metropolis
