= Online Film Critics Society Awards 2010 =

14th Online Film Critics Society Awards

14th Online Film Critics Society Awards

January 3, 2011

Best Picture:
The Social Network

The 14th Online Film Critics Society Awards, honoring the best in film for 2010, were announced on 3 January 2011.

== Winners and nominees ==
=== Best Picture ===
The Social Network

- Black Swan
- Inception
- Toy Story 3
- True Grit
- Winter's Bone

=== Best Director ===
David Fincher – The Social Network

- Darren Aronofsky – Black Swan
- Danny Boyle – 127 Hours
- Joel Coen and Ethan Coen – True Grit
- Christopher Nolan – Inception

=== Best Actor ===
Colin Firth – The King's Speech

- Jeff Bridges – True Grit
- Jesse Eisenberg – The Social Network
- James Franco – 127 Hours
- Ryan Gosling – Blue Valentine
- Édgar Ramírez – Carlos

=== Best Actress ===
Natalie Portman – Black Swan

- Annette Bening – The Kids Are All Right
- Kim Hye-ja – Mother
- Nicole Kidman – Rabbit Hole
- Jennifer Lawrence – Winter's Bone

=== Best Supporting Actor ===
Christian Bale – The Fighter

- Andrew Garfield – The Social Network
- John Hawkes – Winter's Bone
- Mark Ruffalo – The Kids Are All Right
- Geoffrey Rush – The King's Speech

=== Best Supporting Actress ===
Hailee Steinfeld – True Grit

- Amy Adams – The Fighter
- Mila Kunis – Black Swan
- Melissa Leo – The Fighter
- Jacki Weaver – Animal Kingdom

=== Best Original Screenplay ===
Inception – Christopher Nolan

- Black Swan – Mark Heyman, Andres Heinz, and John McLaughlin
- Greenberg – Noah Baumbach
- The Kids Are All Right – Lisa Cholodenko and Stuart Blumberg
- The King's Speech – David Seidler

=== Best Adapted Screenplay ===
The Social Network – Aaron Sorkin

- 127 Hours – Danny Boyle and Simon Beaufoy
- Scott Pilgrim vs. the World – Michael Bacall and Edgar Wright
- True Grit – Joel Coen and Ethan Coen
- Winter's Bone – Debra Granik and Anne Rosellini

=== Best Foreign Language Film ===
Mother

- Carlos
- Dogtooth
- The Girl with the Dragon Tattoo
- A Prophet

=== Best Documentary ===
Exit Through the Gift Shop

- Catfish
- Inside Job
- Joan Rivers: A Piece of Work
- Restrepo
- Waiting for "Superman"

=== Best Animated Feature ===
Toy Story 3

- Despicable Me
- How to Train Your Dragon
- The Illusionist
- Tangled

=== Best Cinematography ===
True Grit – Roger Deakins

- 127 Hours – Anthony Dod Mantle and Enrique Chediak
- Black Swan – Matthew Libatique
- Inception – Wally Pfister
- Shutter Island – Robert Richardson

=== Best Editing ===
Inception – Lee Smith

- 127 Hours – Jon Harris
- Black Swan – Andrew Weisblum
- Scott Pilgrim vs. the World – Jonathan Amos and Paul Machliss
- The Social Network – Kirk Baxter and Angus Wall
