= The Light in Your Eyes (TV series) =

2019 South Korean television series

- Promotional poster
- Also known as: Dazzling; Radiant
- Hangul: 눈이 부시게
- Lit.: Eyes Are Dazzling
- RR: Nuni busige
- MR: Nuni pusige
- Genre: Melodrama
- Written by: Lee Nam-kyu; Kim Soo-jin
- Directed by: Kim Suk-yoon
- Starring: Kim Hye-ja; Han Ji-min; Nam Joo-hyuk; Son Ho-jun
- Composer: Kim Hyung-suk
- Country of origin: South Korea
- Original language: Korean
- No. of episodes: 12

Production
- Executive producer: Kim Ji-yeon
- Producer: Park Jun-seo
- Running time: 60 minutes
- Production company: Drama House (JTBC)

Original release
- Network: JTBC
- Release: February 11 – March 19, 2019

The Light in Your Eyes (Korean: 눈이 부시게; RR: Nuni busige) is a 2019 South Korean television series starring Kim Hye-ja, Han Ji-min, Nam Joo-hyuk, and Son Ho-jun. It aired on JTBC's Mondays and Tuesdays at 21:30 (KST) from February 11 to March 19, 2019. The drama was critically acclaimed for intimately portraying the hardships everyday people face. It is also one of the highest-rated Korean dramas in cable television history.

== Synopsis ==
To prevent her father from dying in a car accident, Kim Hye Ja manipulates time with a special watch she found at a beach as a child. However, manipulating time comes with a heavy price- Hye Ja will age each time she turns back time. Meanwhile, a young man named Lee Joon Ha who has a beautiful friendship with Hye Ja, is exhausted from his family problems and has given up on all his dreams. He now works as a scammer at an elderly care center unaware that Hye Ja has become an old lady and goes there to pass time after turning old for manipulating time. The two cross each other's paths again, but this time both have changed.

== Cast ==
=== Main ===
- Kim Hye-ja as Kim Hye-ja (70 years old)
- Han Ji-min as Kim Hye-ja (26 years old)
- Nam Joo-hyuk as Lee Joon-ha (26 years old) / Kim Sang-hyeon
    - Lee Joon-ha: A man who dreams of becoming a news anchor. Hye-ja's late husband.
    - Kim Sang-hyeon:A Doctor in Hyoja Nursing Hospital, also resembles Hye-ja's late husband, Lee Joon-ha.
- Son Ho-jun as Kim Young-soo / Lee Min-soo
  - Jung Ji-hoon as young Young-soo
    - Kim Young-soo: Hye-ja's older brother
    - Lee Min-soo: Hye-ja's grandson

=== Supporting ===
==== People around Hye-ja ====
- Ahn Nae-sang as Lee Dae-sang
  - Seo Woo-jin as young Dae-sang
- Lee Jung-eun as Moon Jung-eun
- Kim Ga-eun as Lee Hyun-joo
  - Son Sook as elderly Hyun-joo
  - Yoon Chae-eun as young Hyun-joo

Hye-ja's bestfriend

- Song Sang-eun as Yoon Sang-eun

Hye-ja's bestfriend

==== People around Joon-ha ====
- Kim Young-ok as Joon-ha's grandmother

==== Others ====
- Kim Hee-won as Kim Hee-won
- Park Soo-young as Kim Byun-sub
- Jung Young-sook as Chanel (Choi Hwa-young)
- Kim Kwang-sik as Byung-soo
- Woo Hyun as Woo Hyun
- Shim Hee-sub as Doctor (ep.3)

=== Special appearances ===
- Kim Kiri as Park Kwang-soo (Ep. 1)
- Hyun Woo as Kwon Jang-ho (Ep. 1)
- Kim Byung-man as a performer (Ep. 5)
- Choi Moo-sung as an egg seller (Ep. 5)
- Im Chang-jung as a swindler (Ep. 5)
- Hwang Jung-min as a shaman (Ep. 11)
- Yoon Bok-hee as Yoon Bok-hee / elderly Yoon Sang-eun (Ep. 11)

== Production ==
The first script reading took place on September 26, 2018 at JTBC Building in Sangam-dong, Seoul, South Korea.

== Original soundtrack ==
The Light in Your Eyes OST

Soundtrack album by Various artists
- Released: 2019
- Genre: Soundtrack
- Languages: Korean; English
- Labels: Warner Music Korea; JTBC Content Hub

=== Part 1 ===
Released on February 11, 2019
No.	Title	Artist	Length
1.	"Always In My Heart" (내 맘속엔 언제나)	Maytree	3:10
2.	"Always In My Heart" (Inst.)		3:10
Total length:			6:20

=== Part 2 ===
Released on February 18, 2019
No.	Title	Artist	Length
1.	"Picnic" (소풍)	Harim	3:16
2.	"Picnic" (Inst.)		3:16
Total length:			6:32

=== Part 3 ===
Released on February 25, 2019
No.	Title	Artist	Length
1.	"I Just Set It Up"	Vincent	3:47
2.	"I Just Set It Up" (Inst.)		3:47
Total length:			7:34

=== Part 4 ===
Released on March 4, 2019
No.	Title	Artist	Length
1.	"Dazzling Days" (눈부신 날들)	Nam Se-ra	3:45
2.	"Dazzling Days" (Inst.)		3:45
Total length:			7:30

=== Part 5 ===
Released on March 11, 2019
No.	Title	Artist	Length
1.	"Get Warm" (따스해져)	Jang Duk-chul	4:00
2.	"Get Warm" (Inst.)		4:00
Total length:			8:00

=== Part 6 ===
Released on March 18, 2019
No.	Title	Artist	Length
1.	"Paint" (물감)	Kim Yeon-ji	3:29
2.	"Paint" (Inst.)		3:29
Total length:			6:58

== Ratings ==
The Light in Your Eyes : South Korea viewers per episode (millions)

Season	Episode number												Average
Season	1	2	3	4	5	6	7	8	9	10	11	12	Average
1	0.736	0.832	0.977	1.212	1.365	1.460	1.235	1.918	1.716	1.727	2.006	2.223	1.451

Source: Audience measurement performed nationwide by Nielsen Media Research.

Average TV viewership ratings
Ep.	Original broadcast date	Average audience share (AGB Nielsen)	
Ep.	Original broadcast date	Nationwide	Seoul
1	February 11, 2019	3.185%	3.535%
2	February 12, 2019	3.188%	3.722%
3	February 18, 2019	3.743%	4.638%
4	February 19, 2019	5.368%	6.092%
5	February 25, 2019	5.834%	7.536%
6	February 26, 2019	6.567%	8.093%
7	March 4, 2019	5.097%	6.301%
8	March 5, 2019	8.447%	10.831%
9	March 11, 2019	7.711%	9.438%
10	March 12, 2019	7.851%	9.500%
11	March 18, 2019	8.546%	10.669%
12	March 19, 2019	9.731%	12.083%
Average		6.272%	7.703%
In the table above, the blue numbers represent the lowest ratings and the red numbers represent the highest ratings.; This drama aired on a cable channel/pay TV which normally has a relatively smaller audience compared to free-to-air TV/public broadcasters (KBS, SBS, MBC and EBS).

== Awards and nominations ==
Award	Category	Recipient	Result	Ref.
55th Baeksang Arts Awards	Grand Prize	Kim Hye-ja	Won	
55th Baeksang Arts Awards	Best Drama	The Light in Your Eyes	Nominated	
55th Baeksang Arts Awards	Best Director	Kim Suk-yoon	Nominated	
55th Baeksang Arts Awards	Best Actress	Kim Hye-ja	Nominated	
55th Baeksang Arts Awards	Best Supporting Actor	Son Ho-jun	Nominated	
55th Baeksang Arts Awards	Best Supporting Actress	Lee Jung-eun	Won	
55th Baeksang Arts Awards	Best Screenplay	Lee Nam-kyu and Kim Soo-jin	Nominated	
24th Asian Television Awards	Best Drama Series	The Light in Your Eyes	Nominated	
24th Asian Television Awards	Best Actress in a Leading Role	Kim Hye-ja	Nominated	
