= How to Steal a Dog (novel) =

2007 book by Barbara O'Connor

- Author: Barbara O'Connor
- Language: English
- Genre: Fiction
- Published: 2007
- Publication date: March 20, 2007
- Publication place: United States
- Pages: 192/176
- ISBN: 978-0-312-56112-3

How to Steal a Dog is a children's novel by American author Barbara O'Connor, first published by Farrar, Straus and Giroux on April 6, 2007. It was adapted into a 2014 film adaption by a South Korean studio.

== Plot ==
Georgina Hayes, her brother Toby, and their parents lived happily in an apartment in Darby, North Carolina until her father leaves their family. Their limited income results in Georgina and her family being evicted from the apartment, and since then, they have lived in their car and in poverty. Her schoolwork and social life both suffer due to this, but she doesn’t tell anyone about the circumstance. She tells her best friend Luanne Godfrey about this and urges her to keep it secret, but soon finds a way to get money and a new place to live after seeing a reward for a missing dog: Steal one, "return it", and claim the reward money, which she hopes to be five hundred dollars. Throughout the novel Georgina also writes down unofficial dog theft rules in her notebook, such as giving the dog water, food, and shelter.

After roaming around the neighborhood to search for suitable dogs to steal, Georgina and Toby locate a dog named Willy, who meets several criteria in her rules. She also assumes that Carmella is rich due to the exterior of her house, and that the matter’s surname is on the street the siblings are on.

Georgina’s mother manages to get an abandoned house as a temporary home, almost making Georgina abandon her plan, but it is so dilapidated it reinstates her confidence. The house is later boarded up as it turns out the owner did not want anyone there.

Ultimately, Georgina and Toby steal Willy together and hide him at the abandoned house. The plan works with few inconsistencies, but Georgina begins to feel guilty about her actions, and a traveler named Mookie begins to grow suspicious of the dog and his relation to Georgina.

In addition to this, as Georgina befriends Carmella, she realizes that the latter is actually in the lower middle class——the house and street belonged to her deceased grandfather, who sold the properties and left Willy behind for Carmella. Carmella also attempts to borrow money from her sister and uncle to offer a larger reward for Willy’s return, making the guilt worse.

Georgina finally realizes what she did was right and also wrong, and decides to return Willy without the reward money. She confesses to Carmella what she did, but is forgiven, and the two remain friends. It’s also revealed that Mookie knew Willy was stolen all along due to finding his collar, leaving Georgina confused as to why he was friendly to her.

A three days pass and Georgina and Toby's mother announces they will now live in a house with a mutual friend, Louise. Georgina is thrilled to no longer have to live in a car, and they move in.

Feeling happy and looking forward to her life improving, Georgina updates her rulebook one more time to clarify that stealing a dog isn’t a good idea. The novel closes with her smelling the night air instead of the interior of her car, saying that “it doesn’t stink at all.”
