= Barbara O'Connor (author) =

American author of children's books

- Born: Barbara O'Connor; November 9, 1958 (age 67); Greenville, SC
- Citizenship: American
- Occupations: Author, Writer
- Spouse: William O'Connor

Barbara O'Connor (born November 9, 1958) is an American author of children's books.

O'Connor was born and grew up in Greenville, SC. She lived in Duxbury, Massachusetts for 26 years, but now resides in Asheville, North Carolina.

Her books have won awards including the Parents Choice Gold Award and being named ALA Notable Books. Her book How to Steal a Dog has been optioned for a film.

== Bibliography ==
=== Novels ===
- Beethoven in Paradise, 1997
- Me and Rupert Goody, 1999
- Taking Care of Moses, 2004
- Moonpie and Ivy, 2004
- How to Steal a Dog, 2007
- Fame and Glory in Freedom, Georgia, 2003
- Greetings from Nowhere, 2008
- The Small Adventure of Popeye and Elvis, 2009
- The Fantastic Secret of Owen Jester, 2010
- On the Road to Mr. Mineo’s, 2012
- Wish, 2016
- Wonderland, 2018
- Halfway to Harmony, 2021

=== Biographies ===
- Mammolina: A Story about Maria Montessori, 1993
- Up in the Air: The Story of Bessie Coleman, 1996
- Barefoot Dancer: The Story of Isadora Duncan, Carolrhoda Books, 2002
- Katherine Dunham: Pioneer of Black Dance, 2002
- Leonardo Da Vinci: Renaissance Genius, 2002,
