= Moon Sung-keun =

South Korean actor and politician (born 1953)

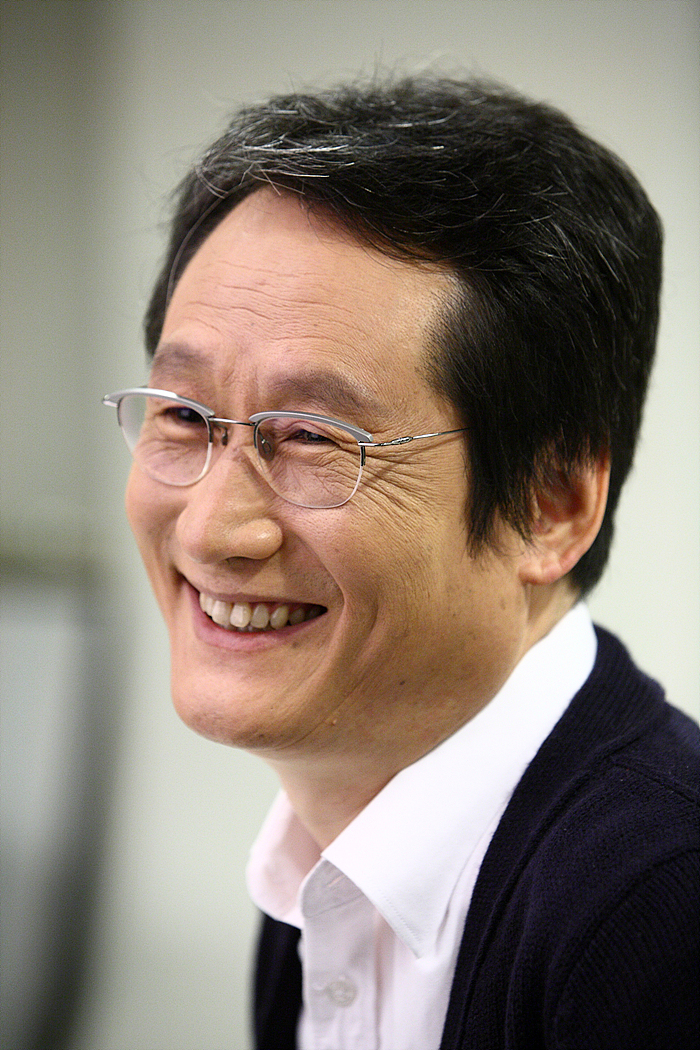
- Moon in 2012
- Born: May 28, 1953 (age 73); Tokyo, Japan
- Education: Sogang University
- Occupations: Actor; politician
- Years active: 1985–present

Korean name
- Hangul: 문성근
- Hanja: 文盛瑾
- RR: Mun Seonggeun
- MR: Mun Sŏnggŭn
- Website: thesase.com

Moon Sung-keun (Korean: 문성근; born May 28, 1953) is a South Korean actor and politician. He has won three Blue Dragon Film Awards, two Baeksang Arts Awards, and two Chunsa Film Art Awards for Best Actor.

== Career ==
Moon was born in Tokyo, Japan. His father was Rev. Moon Ik-hwan, who fought for democracy alongside Kim Dae-jung under the military regime led by Park Chung Hee in 1970s, and was a well-known pro-unification activist. After graduation from Sogang University with a bachelor's degree in International Business, Moon worked as a salaryman for eight years.

In 1985, he began acting in theater, and became a key figure in the beginning of the renaissance of Daehangno stage plays in the mid-1980s, playing the leading role in such mega-hits as Chilsu and Mansu and Till the End of Time. Moon made his film debut in 1990 with Black Republic directed by Park Kwang-su.

During his acting career, Moon has won Best Actor award at the Blue Dragon Film Awards thrice, Baeksang Arts Awards twice, Chunsa Film Art Awards twice, and other accolades.

Moon started his political activities in 2009, becoming the Democratic United Party's temporary chairman in 2012. Since then, he has mostly made special appearances in movies.

In 2017, Moon and a group of South Korean artists filed complaints against two former presidents, Lee Myung-bak, Park Geun-hye, and other six senior officials, asking for a prosecution investigation over the allegation of an "artist blacklist."

Moon is a frequent collaborator of director Lee Chang-dong. He has starred in four of Lee's films, including critically acclaimed Burning (2018).

== Filmography ==
=== Film ===
Film performances
Year	Title		Role	Note
Year	English	Korean	Role	Note
1990	Mother's Summer	어머니의 여름	Gwang-su	
1990	Our Class Accepts Anyone Regardless of Grade	꼴지부터 일등까지 우리 반을 찾습니다	Teacher	
1990	Black Republic	그들도 우리처럼	Kim Gi-yeong/Han Tae-hun	
1991	I Want to Live Just Until 20 years old	스무살까지만 살고 싶어요	Choi Hyeon-jun	
1991	Berlin Report	베를린 리포트	Yeong-cheol	
1991	The Road to the Race Track	경마장 가는 길	R	
1993	No Emergency Exit	비상구가 없다	Dong-o	
1993	The 101st Proposition	101번째 프로포즈	Yeong-seop	
1993	To the Starry Island	그 섬에 가고싶다	Moon Deok-bae/Moon Jae-gu	
1994	To You from Me	너에게 나를 보낸다	"I"	
1994	Out to the World	세상 밖으로	Seong-keun	
1995	Bitter and Sweet	남자는 괴로워		
1995	Sunset Into the Neon Lights	네온 속으로 노을지다	Kim Gyu-hwan	
1995	A Single Spark	아름다운 청년 전태일	Kim Yeong-su	
1995	Man	맨?		
1996	A Petal	꽃잎	Jang	
1997	Green Fish	초록물고기	Bae Tae-gon	
1998	Film-making	죽이는 이야기	Guido	
1998	Bedroom and Courtroom	생과부 위자료 청구소송	Chu Hyeong-do	
2000	Virgin Stripped Bare by Her Bachelors	오! 수정	Yeong-su	
2002	Jealousy Is My Middle Name	질투는 나의 힘	Han Yun-sik	
2005	Princess Aurora	오로라 공주	Oh Seong-ho	
2006	Hanbando	한반도	Gwon Yong-hwan	
2006	Woman on the Beach	해변의 여인	Voice	
2006	Puzzle	두뇌유희 프로젝트, 퍼즐	Hwan	
2007	Soo	수	Gu Yang-won	
2008	Public Enemy Returns	강철중: 공공의 적 1-1	Tae-san	
2009	Missing	실종	Pan-gon	
2009	If You Were Me 4: Relay	시선1318	Principal	
2009	A Brand New Life	여행자	Doctor	
2009	Visitors: Lost in the Mountains	어떤 방문: 첩첩산중		
2010	A Little Pond	작은 연못	Mr. Moon	
2010	Oki's Movie	옥희의 영화	Professor Song	
2012	Unbowed	부러진 화살	Judge Shin Jae-yeol	
2012	In Another Country	다른 나라에서	Mun-su	
2012	National Security	남영동1985	President Yoon	
2013	Hwayi: A Monster Boy	화이: 괴물을 삼킨 아이	CEO Jin	Special appearance
2014	A Girl at My Door	도희야	Nam Gyeong-dae	Special appearance
2014	Haemoo	해무	Wan-ho	
2015	Memories of the Sword	협녀: 칼의 기억	Lee Ee-myeong	Special appearance
2016	Dongju: The Portrait of a Poet	동주	Jeong Ji-yong	Special appearance
2017	The Tooth and the Nail	석조저택 살인사건	Yoon Young-hwan	
2017	On the Beach at Night Alone	밤의 해변에서 혼자	Sang-won	
2017	Forgotten	기억의 밤		
2017	1987: When the Day Comes	1987		Special appearance
2018	Burning	버닝	Attorney	
2019	Black Money	블랙머니	Kang Ki-choon	Special appearance
2023	Project Silence		Byeong-hak	

=== Television series ===
Television series appearances
Year	Title		Role	Note	Ref.
Year	English	Korean	Role	Note	Ref.
2008	The Scales of Providence	신의 저울	Kim Hyeok-jae		
2009	Ja Myung Go	자명고	King Daemusin		
2017	Distorted	조작	Koo Tae-won		
2018	Life	라이프	Kim Tae-sang		
2018	Encounter	남자친구	Cha Jong-hyun		
2019	Confession	자백	Cho Myung-geun		
2019	Vagabond	배가본드	Hong Soon-Jo		
2020	Nobody Knows	아무도 모른다	Kwang In-beom		
2020	When My Love Blooms	화양연화	Jang San		
2021	The Great Shaman Ga Doo-shim	우수무당 가두심	Kyung-pil		
2022	Insider	인사이더	Do Won-bong		
2022	Mental Coach Jegal	멘탈코치 제갈길	Park Seung-tae		
2024	Marry My Husband	내 남편과 결혼해줘	Yoo Han-il		
2025	Our Movie	우리 영화	Kim Hyun-chul		
2025	Ms. Incognito	착한 여자 부세미	Ga Seong-ho		

=== Web series ===
Web series appearances
Year	Title		Role	Notes	Ref.
Year	English	Korean	Role	Notes	Ref.
2023	Moving	무빙	Min Yong-joon	Disney+ Original	

== Awards and nominations ==
Year	Award	Category	Nominated work	Result
1986	22nd Baeksang Arts Awards	Best New Actor (Theater)	Han's Chronicle	Won
1990	1st Chunsa Film Art Awards	Best New Actor	Black Republic	Won
1990	11th Blue Dragon Film Awards	Best Actor	Black Republic	Nominated
1991	27th Baeksang Arts Awards	Best New Actor (Film)	Black Republic	Won
1991	29th Grand Bell Awards	Best Actor	Black Republic	Nominated
1991	12th Blue Dragon Film Awards	Best Supporting Actor	Berlin Report	Nominated
1992	3rd Chunsa Film Art Awards	Best Actor	The Road to the Race Track	Won
1992	28th Baeksang Arts Awards	Best Actor (Film)	The Road to the Race Track	Nominated
1992	12th Korean Association of Film Critics Awards	Best Actor	The Road to the Race Track	Won
1992	30th Grand Bell Awards	Best Actor	The Road to the Race Track	Nominated
1992	13th Blue Dragon Film Awards	Best Actor	The Road to the Race Track	Won
1993	14th Blue Dragon Film Awards	Best Actor	The 101st Proposition	Nominated
1994	30th Baeksang Arts Awards	Best Actor (Film)	To the Starry Island	Nominated
1994	32nd Grand Bell Awards	Best Actor	The 101st Proposition	Nominated
1994	32nd Grand Bell Awards	Best Supporting Actor	To the Starry Island	Nominated
1994	15th Blue Dragon Film Awards	Best Actor	To You from Me	Won
1995	31st Baeksang Arts Awards	Best Actor (Film)	To You from Me	Nominated
1995	33rd Grand Bell Awards	Best Actor	To You from Me	Nominated
1996	41st Asia-Pacific Film Festival	Best Actor	A Petal	Won
1996	34th Grand Bell Awards	Best Actor	A Petal	Nominated
1996	17th Blue Dragon Film Awards	Best Actor	A Petal	Won
1997	33rd Baeksang Arts Awards	Best Actor (Film)	Green Fish	Nominated
1997	35th Grand Bell Awards	Best Supporting Actor	Green Fish	Nominated
2003	2nd Korean Film Awards	Best Actor	Jealousy Is My Middle Name	Nominated

== Election results ==
Year	Elections	Constituency	Political party	Votes (%)	Results
2012	19th National Assembly General Election	Buk–Gangseo B (Busan)	DUP	44,972 (45.15%)	Defeated (2nd)
