= 1990 in South Korea =

- Centuries: 20th; 21st
- Decades: 1970s; 1980s; 1990s; 2000s; 2010s
- See also: Other events in 1990; Years in South Korea; Timeline of Korean history 1990 in North Korea

Events from the year 1990 in South Korea.

== Incumbents ==
- President: Roh Tae-woo
- Prime Minister: Kang Young-hoon (until December 27), Ro Jai-bong (starting December 27)

== Events ==
- December Unknown date – A first convenience store retail GS25 (then LG25) open in downtown Seoul.

== Sport ==
- 1990 K League
- South Korea wins the 1990 Dynasty Cup
- South Korea lose all their matches at the FIFA World Cup

== Films ==
- List of South Korean films of 1990

== Births ==
- January 9 - Choi Su-min, handball player
- January 25 - Lee Jun-ho, singer-songwriter and actor
- January 30 - Esom, actress and model
- January 31 - Park Hae-mi, sport shooter
- February 10 - Choi Soo-young, singer and actress
- February 14 - Park Ki-ju, field hockey player
- February 12 - Park Bo-young, actress
- February 18 - Park Shin-hye, actress
- February 19 - Lee Elijah, actress and model
- February 24 - Ryu Eun-hee, handball player
- March 20 - Jung Kyung-eun, badminton player
- March 24 - Na Ah-reum, road cyclist
- March 26 - Xiumin, singer and actor
- March 31 - Bang Yong-guk, rapper, singer-songwriter and record producer
- April 8 - Jonghyun, singer (d. 2017)
- April 24 - Kim Tae-ri, actress
- May 21 - Choi In-jeong, fencer
- May 30 - Lim Yoona, singer and actress
- June 30 - N, singer, actor, presenter, and radio host (VIXX)
- August 10 - Lee Sung-kyung, model and actress
- August 27 - Nam Yeong-sin, handball player
- August 31 - Lee Kye-rim, sport shooter
- October 23 - Lee Eun-bi, handball player
- October 26 - Bae Yeon-ju, badminton player
- November 10 - Leo, singer-songwriter and actor
- November 22
  - Jang Dong-woo, singer, rapper and actor
  - Seo Eun-kwang, singer
- November 29
  - Lee Min-hyuk, singer, rapper, songwriter and actor
  - Jung Jae-kwang, actor

== Deaths ==
- 24 September – Kang Joon-ho, boxer (b. 1928)

== See also ==
- List of South Korean films of 1990
- Years in Japan
- Years in North Korea
