= List of South Korean films of 1990 =

A list of films produced in South Korea in 1990:

Title	Director	Cast	Genre	Notes
1990
All That Falls Has Wings	Jang Gil-su	Kang Soo-yeon	Youth Melodrama	Best Film and Best Director at the Grand Bell Awards
Be a Wicked Woman	Kim Ki-young	Youn Yuh-jung; Hyun Gil-soo		
Black Republic	Park Kwang-su			
The Dream	Bae Chang-hosu			
General's Son	Im Kwon-taek	Park Sang-min; Shin Hyun-joon		
Ggok-Ji-Ddan 꼭지딴	Kim Yeong-nam	Jeong Bo-seok; Choi Jin-sil; Park Jin-seong		
Let's Look at the Sky Sometimes	Kim Sung-hong			
The Lovers of Woomook-baemi	Jang Sun-woo			
Madame Aema 4	Suk Do-won	Ju Ri-hye	Ero	
Mayumi	Shin Sang-ok			
The Naked Rage
My Love, My Bride 나의 사랑, 나의 신부	Lee Myung-Se	Park Joong-hoon; Choi Jin-sil; Kim Bo-yeon	Comedy	
Only Because You Are a Woman	Kim Yoo-jin			
Oseam	Park Chul-soo			
Partisans of South Korea	Chung Ji-young	Ahn Sung-ki; Choi Jin-sil		
Red Cherry 5				
Red Woman				
The Rooster	Shin Seung-soo			
Song of Resurrection	Lee Jung-gook			
You Know What? It's a Secret 2 있잖아요 비밀이에요 2	Jo Geum-hwan	Choi Jin-sil	Drama	
