= 1992 in South Korea =

- Centuries: 20th; 21st
- Decades: 1970s; 1980s; 1990s; 2000s; 2010s
- See also: Other events in 1992; Years in South Korea; Timeline of Korean history 1992 in North Korea

Events from the year 1992 in South Korea.

== Incumbents ==
- President: Roh Tae-woo
- Prime Minister: Chung Won-shik until October 8, then Hyun Soong-jong

== Events ==
=== January ===
- 5 January - U.S. President George Bush arrives in Seoul for a ceremony honouring Korean War dead.
- 19 January - The news embargo is lifted on George Bush's visit.

=== April ===
- 15 April - China gifts 400 tons of pork to North Korea for Kim Il Sung’s 80th birthday but informs him of plans to recognize Seoul.

=== August ===
- 24 August - China formally recognizes South Korea, reshaping Northeast Asia's power balance.
- 28 August - Increased travel between China and South Korea begins as business and family visits surge.

=== July ===
- 23 July - North Korea snubs China by not sending a congratulatory message on the Communist Party's anniversary.

=== October ===
- 8 October - Hyun Soong-jong becomes prime minister of South Korea, replacing Chung Won-shik

=== November ===
- 2 November - Prince Charles and Princess Diana arrive in South Korea for a four-day visit, lay a wreath at the Korean War cemetery, and attend the opening of the new British Embassy.
- 3 November - Prince Charles and Princess Diana visit the Korean first family, lay a wreath at Gloucester Valley for fallen British soldiers, and attend a dinner hosted by President Roh Tae Woo.
- 4 November - Prince Charles opens the "Britain for Korea" fair, joins business seminars, and attends a textile expo. Diana visits the Salvation Army and a British school.

=== December ===
- 1 December - Amnesty International sends an open letter to all South Korean presidential candidates urging human rights reforms.
- 3 December - Amnesty International releases its presidential candidates-intended letter to the press, highlighting ten urgent human rights concerns.
- 18 December -
  - South Korea holds its presidential election.
  - Kim Young-sam is elected President of South Korea, the first non-military one in 30 years.
- 29 December - Nine convicted murderers are executed at Seoul and Taegu prisons.
- 31 December - Ministry of Justice announces large-scale amnesty for political prisoners and criminals.

== Births ==
- January 11 - Hoony, rapper and dancer
- February 6 - Jung Yu-ra, handball player
- February 7 - Cheon Eun-bi, field hockey player
- February 12 - Soyou, singer
- February 14 - Lee Joo-young, actress
- March 7 - Hyunsik, singer-songwriter
- March 13 - L, singer and actor
- March 20 - Sandeul, singer-songwriter
- April 6 - Ken, singer and actor
- April 9 - U-Kwon, singer
- May 1 - Hani, singer and actress
- May 6 - Baekhyun, singer and actor
- June 6 - Hyuna, singer-songwriter, rapper, and model
- June 18 - Shownu, singer, dancer, and actor
- July 12 - Woo Do-hwan, actor
- July 12 - Kim Tae-hwan, actor and model
- August 7 - Jang Ki-yong, actor and model
- September 4 - Park Eun-bin, actress
- September 14 - Zico, rapper, record producer, and singer-songwriter
- September 21 - Bak Ji-yun, judoka
- September 25 - Kim Jang-mi, sport shooter
- October 19 - Kim Ji-won, actress
- November 6 - Yoo Su-bin, actor
- November 27 - Chanyeol, rapper, singer-songwriter, and actor
- December 4 - Jin, singer
- December 22 - Moonbyul, rapper and singer
- December 23 - Yang Se-jong, actor and model
- December 30 - Yuna, singer-songwriter and actress

== See also ==
- List of South Korean films of 1992
