= 1994 in South Korea =

- Centuries: 20th; 21st
- Decades: 1970s; 1980s; 1990s; 2000s; 2010s
- See also: Other events in 1994; Years in South Korea; Timeline of Korean history 1994 in North Korea

Events from the year 1994 in South Korea.

== Incumbents ==
- President: Kim Young-sam
- Prime Minister:
  - until April 29: Lee Hoi-chang
  - April 29 – December 17: Lee Yung-dug
  - starting December 17: Lee Hong-koo

== Births ==
=== January ===
- January 6 – Jay B, singer and actor
- January 14 – Kai, singer and actor
- January 18 – Minzy, singer, rapper, and dancer
- January 20 – Lee Chang-min, footballer
- January 21
  - Seungyoon, singer-songwriter and actor
  - Lim Kim, singer
- January 23 – Kwak Min-jeong, figure skater
- January 24 – Yoo Young-jae, singer and actor

=== February ===
- February 5 – Lee Jong-hyun, basketball player
- February 10
  - Seulgi, singer
  - Naeun, singer and actress
- February 12 – Subin, singer-songwriter and actress
- February 15 – Jin Se-yeon, actress
- February 18 – J-Hope, rapper, singer-songwriter, and dancer
- February 21 – Wendy, singer
- February 22 – Nam Joo-hyuk, model and actor
- February 25 – Yang Ha-eun, table tennis player

=== March ===
- March 3 – Jung Min-ah, actress
- March 3 – Kim Woo-seok, actor
- March 22 – Sungwoon, singer-songwriter
- March 25 – An Baul, judoka
- March 29 – Sulli, singer and actress (d. 2019)

=== April ===
- April 12 – Sehun, singer-songwriter, actor, dancer, and rapper
- April 22 – Lee Hyo-jin, handball player
- April 23 – Song Kang, actor
- April 28 – Kim Kyung-hyun, bobsledder
- April 30 – Chae Seo-jin, actress

=== May ===
- May 3
  - Kim Hye-jin, swimmer
  - Shin Mi-hwa, bobsledder
- May 10 – Taehyun, singer-songwriter and actor
- May 13 – Kim Jong-hyuk, footballer
- May 27 – Park So-young, badminton player
- May 28 – Son Yeon-jae, rhythmic gymnast
- May 31 – Shim Eun-kyung, actress

=== June ===
- June 1 – Yun Seung-hyun, high jumper
- June 3 – Lee Dong-soo, footballer
- June 9 – Hyeri, singer and actress
- June 14
  - Taeil, former singer
  - Lee So-hee, badminton player
- June 20 – Kang Tae-oh, actor and singer
- June 23 – Jung Ho-yeon, model and actress

=== July ===
- July 5 – Rachel Jun, actress
- July 10 – Chae Soo-bin, actress
- July 14 – Kim Dong-hyeon, footballer
- July 18 – Lee Yoo-mi, actress
- July 22 – Lee So-ra, tennis player

=== August ===
- August 6 – Won Seon-pil, handball player
- August 10 – Chun In-gee, golfer
- August 16 – Niel, singer-songwriter and actor
- August 25 – Lee Jang-mi, badminton player
- August 26 – Yezi, singer and rapper
- August 30 – Youngji, singer and dancer

=== September ===
- September 12 – RM, rapper
- September 22 – Jinyoung, singer-songwriter and actor
- September 23 – Mijoo, singer
- September 25 – Dohee, singer and actress
- September 28 – Kim Tae-yun, speed skater

=== October ===
- October 4
  - Baek Ee-seul, field hockey player
  - Ilhoon, rapper, singer-songwriter, and actor
- October 10 – Bae Suzy, singer and actress
- October 26 – Joohoney, rapper and singer-songwriter
- October 31 – Jaehyuck Choi, composer

=== November ===
- November 17 – Kim Ye-ji, rower
- November 18 – Han So-hee, actress and model
- November 26 – Park Ji-hyun, actress and model

=== December ===
- December 6 – Shin Seung-chan, badminton player
- December 19 – Kim Dong-jun, footballer
- December 21 – Ahn Hyeon-beom, footballer
- December 24 – Seungwoo, singer-songwriter and actor
- December 25 – Kim Min Gue, actor

== Deaths ==
- January 17 – Chung Il-kwon, politician, diplomat and soldier (b. 1917)
- January 18 – Moon Ik-hwan, pastor, theologian, poet, and activist (b. 1918)
- May 22 – Jang Il-soon, educator and social and environment activist (b. 1928)

== See also ==
- List of South Korean films of 1994
- Years in Japan
- Years in North Korea
