= Hanji (film) =

- Theatrical release poster
- Directed by: Im Kwon-taek
- Written by: Im Kwon-taek; Song Gil-han
- Produced by: Min Byung-lock; Lee Hee-won
- Starring: Park Joong-hoon; Kang Soo-yeon; Ye Ji-won
- Cinematography: Kim Hoon-kwang
- Edited by: Park Soon-duk
- Music by: Kim Soo-chul
- Production company: Jeonju International Film Festival
- Release date: March 17, 2011
- Running time: 118 minutes
- Country: South Korea
- Language: Korean
- Budget: US$1.73 million
- Box office: US$310,073

Hanji (Korean: 달빛 길어올리기; RR: Dalbit gireoolligi; lit. 'Scooping Up the Moonlight') is a 2011 South Korean drama film written and directed by Im Kwon-taek. It is Im's 101st film and was inspired by a true story.

== Plot ==
Pil-yong is a middling civil servant who is gripped by guilt every time he sees his wife Hyo-kyung, who is half-paralyzed from a stroke induced by his affair with another woman. But he finds newfound purpose in life when he is assigned to revive Jeonju's hanji industry. Hanji is Korean traditional paper made from mulberry trees; it is known in Asia for its beauty, flexibility and high quality, can reportedly last a thousand years, and is used for writing and creating 2D images similar to painting as well as 3D objects such as chamber pots and tea service. What begins as a desperate attempt to be promoted at work turns into a consuming passion as Pil-yong discovers the beauty of the craft, and he joins other devotees (such as documentary filmmaker Ji-won) to reenact traditional methods of hanji-making under the moonlight.

== Cast ==
- Park Joong-hoon as Pil-yong
- Kang Soo-yeon as Ji-won
- Ye Ji-won as Hyo-kyung
- Ahn Byung-kyung as Deok-soon
- Jang Hang-sun as Monk Doam
- Jung Woo-hyuk as Section chief
- Im Seung-dae as Subsection chief
- Hwang Choon-ha as Clerk
- Min Do-young as Assistant clerk
- Jin Kyung as Female section chief
- Han Soo-yeon as Jung Da-young
- Kwon Hyun-sang as Yong-gi
- Min Kyung-jin as Oh Kyung-min
- Kim Gi-cheon as Kim Choon-byung
- Kwon Tae-won as Boss Kwon
- Bang Eun-mi as Hwang Kyung-ja
- Kim Byung-choon as Chun Jang-in
- Park Min-hee as Boss Min
- Kim Dong-ho as Kim Joong-kwon (cameo)
- Kim Young-bin as Pil-yong's older brother (cameo)
