= 1993 in Korea =

1993 in Korea may refer to:

- 1993 in North Korea
- 1993 in South Korea
