= 1991 in Korea =

1991 in Korea may refer to:

- 1991 in North Korea
- 1991 in South Korea
