= Choe Dooseok =

South Korean poet

Choe Dooseok (Korean: 최두석, 1956 - ) is a Korean poet. Since his debut in 1980, he has continued to write poems that combine facticity with lyricism. His poems are considered compassionate toward objects, and at the same time, equipped with keen insight into reality. He argued for narrative poetics from a realist perspective.

== Biography ==
He was born in 1956 in Damyang, Jeollanam-do Province. He debuted by publishing "Gimtongjeong (김통정 Kim Tongjeong)" in Simsang in 1980. He was a member of a literary coterie, Owalsi, along with Kwak Jae-gu, Yun Jaecheol, Na Haecheol and Ko Kwangheon. He published his review, "Siwa rieolism (시와 리얼리즘 Poetry and Realism)" 3) in the fourth volume of Owalsi (오월시 May Poetry), and a long poem, "Imjingang (임진강 Imjingang River)" in the fifth volume.

Over the 30 years of writing poems, he has diligently published many poetry collections including Daekkot (대꽃 Bamboo Flower; 1984), Imjingang (임진강 Imjingang River; 1986), Seongekkot (성에꽃 Frost on Windows; 1990), Saramdeul saie kkochi pil ttae (사람들 사이에 꽃이 필 때When Flowers Bloom Among People; 1997), Kkochege gireul munneunda (꽃에게 길을 묻는다 Ask Flowers For Direction; 2003), Tugukkot (투구꽃 Monkshood; 2009), Sumsalikkot (숨살이꽃 Flower That Breathes Life; 2018). "When Flowers Bloom Among People" was used as lyrics of a song with the same title by singer Ahn Chi-hwan in 2004. He also worked on several reviews such as Rieolismui sijeongsin (리얼리즘의 시정신 Poetic Mind of Realism; 1992) and Siwa rieolism (시와 리얼리즘 Poetry and Realism; 1996). He has been serving as a professor of creative writing at Hanshin University. He received the Buddhist Literary Award in 2007, and the Oh Janghwan Literary Award in 2010.

== Writing ==
=== Narrative and Poetry ===
Choe's poetry is based on the consciousness that literature needs to reflect reality and to participate in social reform. This consciousness was expressed in a form of narrative poem. He revealed his strong determination to combine poetry and narrative, songs and stories in the prologue poem "Noraewa iyagi (노래와 이야기 Songs and Stories)" in his first poetry collection, Bamboo Flower (1984).

Narrative poems are realized in a form of serial poems or long poems. The title poem of Bamboo Flower (1984) consists of a series of poems describing the historical relation between the Donghak Rebellion in the late 19th century and the Gwangju Democratization Movement of the 1980s. Imjingang River (1986) is a long poem that truthfully illustrates hardships Kim Nakjung went through as a reunification activist, and his passion toward peaceful reunification of South and North Koreas. In the scope of narrative poems, poetic representation of historical figures is included. Frost on Windows (1990) contains a poem that is based on Jeon Tae-il, a workers' rights activist, and Seo Hobin, a victim of the May 18 Gwangju uprising.

=== Nature and Poetry ===
Since the late 1990s when the military dictatorship was over and democracy was in place, his poetry has turned from the narrative poems into various forms. In "Epilogue" in When Flowers Bloom Among People (1997), he said "I want to write poems that naturally bloom like flowers." Unlike his poems of the 1980s, he used a motif from nature such as sycamore, nut pine and waterfall; lines and verses became shorter; and his empathy with nature is more highlighted. Ask Flowers for Direction (2003) illustrates his ecological imagination toward Geomnyongso, a Kalopanax and a young zelkova tree. Monkshood (2009) expresses his concerns for harmonious life between nature and human being. Flower That Breathes Life (2018), named after a mythical flower, shows introspection on the inherently close association between nature and life.

As he says that he has aspired to living in tune with the world, which is the basis of his poems, the realm of his poetry gets deeper as he desperately tries to communicate with living conditions he faces at any moment.

== Works ==
=== 시집 ===
1. 《대꽃》, 문학과지성사, 1984 / Daekkot (Bamboo Blossom), Munji, 1984
2. 《임진강》, 청사, 1986 / Imjingang (Imjingang River), Cheongsa, 1986
3. 《성에꽃》, 문학과지성사, 1990 / Seongekkot (Frost on Windows), Munji, 1990
4. 《사람들 사이에 꽃이 필 때》, 문학과지성사, 1997 / Saramdeul saie kkochi pil ttae (When Flowers Bloom Among People) Munji, 1997
5. 《꽃에게 길을 묻는다》, 문학과지성사, 2003 / Kkochege gireul munneunda (Ask Flowers for Direction) Munji, 2003
6. 《투구꽃》, 창비, 2009 / Tugukkot (Monkshood), Changbi, 2009
7. 《숨살이꽃》, 문학과지성사, 2018 / Sumsalikkot (Flower That Breathes Life)

=== 에세이 ===
- 《시의 샘터에서》, 웅진북스, 2003 / Siui samteoeseo (At the Fountain of Poetry), Woongjin Books, 2003

=== 평론집 ===
1. 《리얼리즘의 시정신》, 실천문학사, 1992 / Rieolismui sijeongsin (Poetic Mind of Realism), Literature and Practice, 1992
2. 《시와 리얼리즘》, 창비, 1996 / Siwa rieolism (Poetry and Realism), Changbi, 1996

=== Compilations ===
- <달팽이>, 최두석, 나희덕 엮음, 《나의 대표시를 말한다》, b, 2012 / Choe Dooseok, Na Huideok. "Dalpaengi (Snail)" Naui daepyosireul malhanda (Speaking About My Representative Poems), b, 2012

== Awards ==
- 2007, Buddhist Literary Award (불교문예작품상) (Monkshood)
- 2010, Oh Janghwan Literary Award (Monkshood)
