= 1993 in South Korea =

- Centuries: 20th; 21st
- Decades: 1970s; 1980s; 1990s; 2000s; 2010s
- See also: Other events in 1993; Years in South Korea; Timeline of Korean history 1993 in North Korea

Events from the year 1993 in South Korea.

== Incumbents ==
- President: Roh Tae-woo (until February 24), Kim Young-sam (starting February 24)
- Prime Minister:
  - until February 25: Hyun Soong-jong
  - February 25 - December 17: Hwang In-sung
  - starting December 17: Lee Hoi-chang

== Events ==
- July 26 - Asiana Airlines Flight 733 crashes near Mokpo Airport, killing 68 of the 116 passengers and crew.

== Births ==
- January 12 - D.O., actor and singer
- January 21 - Kim Sei-young, golfer
- January 24 - Yoon Ji-su, fencer
- February 2 - P.O, rapper, singer, and actor
- February 4 - Bae Noo-ri, actress
- February 15 - Ravi, rapper and songwriter
- February 27 - Gong Seung-yeon, actress
- February 28 - Hwang Seong-eun, sport shooter
- March 1 - Wonho, singer
- March 3 - Seo Ji-yeon, fencer
- March 9 - Suga, rapper, songwriter, and record producer
- March 23 - Lee Hyun-woo, actor and singer
- March 30 - Ji Soo, actor
- March 30 - Mino, rapper, singer-songwriter, music producer, and actor
- April 13 - Lee Seol, actress
- April 22
  - Hwayoung, singer and actress
  - Hyoyoung, model, actress, and singer
- May 6 - Dasom, actress and singer
- May 7 - Yoon So-hee, actress
- May 13 - Minah, singer and actress
- May 16 - IU, singer-songwriter and actress
- June 7 - Jiyeon, singer, actress, and model
- June 9 - Heo Nam-jun, actor
- June 16 - Park Bo-gum, actor and singer
- June 20 - Kim Jin-yi, handball player
- June 28 - Lee Tae-ri, actor
- July 3 - Roy Kim, singer-songwriter
- July 18 - Taemin, singer and actor
- July 27 - Park Gyu-young, actress and model
- August 10 - Hyejeong, singer and actress
- August 12 - Luna, singer, dancer, and actress
- August 13 - Bomi, singer and actress
- August 14 - Gongchan, singer and actor
- August 17 - Yoo Seung-ho, actor
- August 18 - Jung Eun-ji, singer-songwriter and actress
- August 23 - Hyelin, singer and DJ
- September 3 - Lee So-jung, singer
- September 21 - Mina, singer and actress
- October 12 - Seo Kang-joon, actor and singer
- October 28 - Park Seo-ham, actor, singer, and rapper
- November 3 - Minhyuk, singer
- December 19 - Young K, singer-songwriter and rapper

== Deaths ==
- September 5 - Baek Du-jin, politician (b. 1908)

== See also ==
- List of South Korean films of 1993
- Years in Japan
- Years in North Korea
