= Let Me Out =

Let Me Out may refer to:

- Let Me Out (film), a 2013 South Korean film
- "Let Me Out" (song), a 2017 song by Gorillaz from Humanz
- "Let Me Out", a 1979 song by the Knack
- "Let Me Out", a 2013 song by Mr FijiWiji
