= 1991 in South Korea =

- Centuries: 20th; 21st
- Decades: 1970s; 1980s; 1990s; 2000s; 2010s
- See also: Other events in 1991; Years in South Korea; Timeline of Korean history 1991 in North Korea

Events from the year 1991 in South Korea.

== Incumbents ==
- President: Roh Tae-woo
- Prime Minister: Ro Jai-bong (until 24 May), Chung Won-shik (starting 24 May)

== Events ==
- 9 December – SBS Television, a major nationwide television station, starts official regular broadcasting service.
- 14 August - Kim Hak-sun's first public testimony, shedding light on the abuse of Japanese "military comfort women"

== Kim Hak-sun "Comfort Women" Testimony ==
Until 1991, the international community largely had never heard the tragic stories of the "comfort women". "Comfort women" is the euphemistic phrasing referring to the women who endured sexual slavery until 1945, at the hands of the Japanese military in Japan and abroad up until the Pacific War ended (Soh, 1996). In 1991, survivor and eventual activist Kim Hak-sun publicly testified of the horrors she experienced as a military "comfort woman". Kim's public testimony paved the way for not only fellow Korean women to speak out about their abuse but global victims as well.

In her late sixties, Kim Hak-sun gave the first public testimony of the life of a "comfort woman" in August 1991. In December 1991, she then filed a lawsuit against the Japanese government for their crimes during the Pacific War. Kim was joined by many other "comfort women" as they too filed lawsuits against the Japanese government. Their demands often included a "formal apology, compensation, construction of a monument, and correction of Japanese history textbooks to teach the truth about the 'comfort women'".

Many of the women that came forward after Kim's testimony shared similar horrific accounts of their times at these so-called "comfort stations". While in these camps, many women suffered from sexually transmitted diseases and would also be subjected to forced abortions (Luck, 2018). Due to the inhumane conditions and violence inflicted on these women, many died during their enslavement.

The long-standing silence of the "comfort women" was due to many various factors. Many of the women, enslaved for these "comfort stations" were taken from "poor, rural families", thus leaving very few avenues for them to pursue justice later in life. Similarly, in the patriarchal society of Korea at the time, coming forward with such claims of sexual slavery would have been seen as bringing shame on her family. Many were left to bear the burden of their pain and injustice alone. The injustice only furthered as some of the survivors took their lives.

Even after Kim Hak-sun's testimony, there was no formal acknowledgment, apology, or reparations given by the Japanese government until 1993. In 1993, the then Chief Cabinet Secretary, Kono Yohei, issued an apology and admitted to "the Japanese government's responsibility for the comfort station operations" (Young, 2014). However, many view the Japanese government's acknowledgment as "half-hearted". Director of Asian studies at Temple University, Japan, Jeff Kingston, stated (while referencing the pledge of teaching about "comfort women" in the Japanese school curriculum), "...But this latter pledge has been broken. Twenty years ago, all of Japan's mainstream secondary school textbooks covered the comfort women, and now none of them do, at Prime Minister Shinzo Abe's behest.".

== Births ==
- 3 January – Goo Hara, singer and actress (KARA) (d. 2019)
- 8 January – Shin Ji-min, singer and rapper (AOA)
- 19 January - Hwang In-youp, actor and model
- 5 February - Anda, singer-songwriter
- 8 February – Woohyun, singer-songwriter and actor (INFINITE)
- 12 February - Soyou, singer (SISTAR)
- 21 February – Solar, singer-songwriter and actress (Mamamoo)
- 26 February
  - CL, singer and rapper (2NE1)
  - Changsub, singer and actor (BTOB)
- 3 March – Park Chorong, singer-songwriter and actress (Apink)
- 8 March – Yoon Jisung, singer and actor
- 13 March - Kwon Nara, singer and actress (Hello Venus)
- 29 March – Irene, singer, rapper, and actress (Red Velvet)
- 16 April
  - Park Seung-a, field hockey player
  - Kim Seong-yeon, judoka
- 17 April – Jeong Bo-kyeong, judoka
- 2 May – Jinwoon, singer (2AM)
- 3 May – Samuel Seo, singer-songwriter, rapper, and record producer
- 6 May – Ahn Eun-jin, actress
- 22 May – Suho, singer-songwriter, actor and model (EXO)
- 6 June – Dongwoon, singer (Highlight)
- 15 June – Kim Jan-di, judoka
- 16 June – CNU, singer-songwriter, actor, and composer (B1A4)
- 16 June – Ryan Bang, entertainer based in the Philippines
- 21 June – Min, singer-songwriter and actress (Miss A)
- 28 June
  - Kang Min-hyuk, musician, singer-songwriter, drummer, and actor (CNBLUE)
  - Seohyun, singer-songwriter and actress (SNSD)
- 2 July – Kim Go-eun, actress
- 7 July
  - Kim Bum, actor and singer
  - Choi Tae-joon, actor
- 29 July – Sung Ji-hyun, badminton player
- 16 August
  - Rise, singer (Ladies' Code) (d. 2014)
  - Hoon, singer and actor (U Kiss)
- 26 August – Kim Min-seok, singer-songwriter (MeloMance)
- 27 August – Sungyeol, singer and actor (Infinite)
- 8 September – Park So-dam, actress
- 14 September – Nana, singer, actress, and model (After School)
- 15 September – Lee Jung-shin, singer, actor, and rapper (CNBLUE)
- 17 September – An Byeong-hun, golfer
- 23 September – Key, singer-songwriter (Shinee)
- 18 November – Jinyoung, singer-songwriter, actor, and record producer (B1A4)
- 2 December – Minho, singer-songwriter, rapper, and actor (Shinee)
- 10 December – Elly, rapper and singer-songwriter (EXID)
- 17 December – Lee Jae-jin, musician and actor (F.T Island)
- 26 December – Seo Jung-eun, field hockey player

== See also ==
- List of South Korean films of 1991
- Years in Japan
- Years in North Korea
