= Kwon Hyun-sang =

South Korean actor (born 1981)

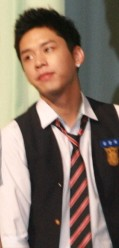
- Kwon in 2010
- Born: Im Dong-jae; July 2, 1981 (age 45); Seoul, South Korea
- Education: Dankook University (Theater and Film)
- Occupation: Actor
- Years active: 2008–present
- Agent: T Entertainment
- Parent: Im Kwon-taek (father)

Korean name
- Hangul: 임동재
- RR: Im Dongjae
- MR: Im Tongjae

Stage name
- Hangul: 권현상
- RR: Gwon Hyeonsang
- MR: Kwŏn Hyŏnsang

Im Dong-jae (Korean: 임동재; born July 2, 1981), better known professionally as Kwon Hyun-sang, is a South Korean actor.

He is the son of film director Im Kwon-taek.

== Career ==
Kwon Hyun-sang made his acting debut in the 2008 horror movie Death Bell, which was followed by supporting roles in several films and television series. Then in 2013, he played his first leading role in the indie comedy Let Me Out.

Kwon also appeared in a bit part in Hanji, which was directed by his father, acclaimed film director Im Kwon-Taek. His mother is retired actress Chae Ryung.

== Filmography ==
=== Films ===
Year	Title	Role
2008	Death Bell	Cha Jae-wook
2010	Death Bell 2: Bloody Camp	JK
2011	A City in Blossom	Park Hyun-sang
2011	Hanji	Yong-ki
2011	The Suicide Forecast	Man in motel (cameo)
2012	Almost Che	Nam-jung
2012	Don't Cry Mommy	Park Joon
2012	The Tower	Kang Young-hoon
2013	Fists of Legend	
2013	Let Me Out	Moo-young
2015	Bitch Heart Asshole	Jung-nam
2015	Tattooist	Oh Chun-ki

=== Television series ===
Year	Title	Role	Network
2008	Les Jolis Garcons		OnStyle
2009	Soul	Jo Jae-il	MBC
2010	Master of Study	Kwak Jong-min	KBS2
2011	The Princess' Man	Prince Do-won	KBS2
2012	The King 2 Hearts	Yum Dong-ha	MBC
2012	Vampire Prosecutor 2	L	OCN
2013	King of Ambition	Yang Taek-bae	SBS
2013	The Fugitive of Joseon	Im Kkuk-jung	KBS2
2015	Blood	Nam Chul-hoon	KBS2
2015	Cheo Yong 2	Ko Kyung-bin (ep.3)	OCN
2016	My Horrible Boss	Park Hyun-woo	JTBC
2016	Always Spring	Joo Yoon-ho	MBC
2019	My Absolute Boyfriend		

=== Music video appearances ===
Year	Song title	Artist
2009	"I Don't Care"	2NE1
2012	"Far Away… Young Love"	C-Clown

== Theater ==
Year	Title	Role
2008	Love's Labour's Lost (South Korean adaptation)	
