= Come Come Come Upward =

- Poster to Come Come Come Upward (1989)
- Hangul: 아제 아제 바라 아제
- RR: Aje aje bara aje
- MR: Aje aje para aje
- Directed by: Im Kwon-taek
- Written by: Han Seung-won
- Produced by: Lee Tae-won
- Starring: Kang Soo-yeon; Jin Yeong-mi; Yu In-chon; Han Ji-il; Jeon Moo-song; Yoon In-Ja; Yoon Yang-ha; Kim Se-jun; An Byung-kyung; Choi Jong-won
- Cinematography: Ku Jung-mo
- Edited by: Park Sun-duk
- Music by: Kim Jeong-kil
- Production company: Taehung Pictures
- Release date: March 3, 1989
- Running time: 134 minutes
- Country: South Korea
- Language: Korean

Come Come Come Upward (Korean: 아제 아제 바라 아제; RR: Aje aje bara aje) is a 1989 South Korean drama film directed by Im Kwon-taek.

== Plot ==
The film examines the lives of two young women linked by their affiliation with a Buddhist temple.

== Accolades ==
- Best Film: Grand Bell Awards
- Best Actress, Bronze St. George (Kang Soo-yeon); 16th Moscow International Film Festival
- Special Prize Im Kwon-taek; Moscow International Film Festival

Nominated

- Golden St. George (Im Kwon-taek); Moscow International Film Festival

== Sources ==
- "Aje Aje Bara Aje (Film review)". Variety. 1989-07-19. p. 21.
- "Im Kwon-taek's Retrospective". 5th Festival of Korean Cinema in Italy.
- James, David E. (2001). "Im Kwon-Taek – Korean National Cinema and Buddhism". Film Quarterly. Vol. 54, no. 3 (April). pp. 14–31.

Preceded by Diary of King Yeonsan	Grand Bell Awards for Best Film; 1989	Succeeded by All That Falls Has Wings
