= Farewell to the Duman River =

- Poster to Farewell to the Duman River (1962)
- Hangul: 두만강아 잘 있거라
- Hanja: 豆滿江아 잘 있거라
- RR: Dumanganga jal itgeora
- MR: Tuman'ganga chal itkŏra
- Directed by: Im Kwon-taek
- Written by: Yu Han-chul
- Produced by: Choi Kwan-du
- Starring: Kim Seok-hun; Park No-shik
- Cinematography: Choi Ho-jin
- Edited by: Kim Hui-su
- Music by: Park Chun-seok
- Distributed by: Han-Hong Movies
- Release date: February 4, 1962
- Running time: 96 minutes
- Country: South Korea
- Language: Korean
- Box office: $3,060

Farewell to the Duman River (Korean: 두만강아 잘 있거라) is a 1962 South Korean film. Directed by Im Kwon-taek in his directorial debut, it became a huge hit, establishing his reputation as a director and ensuring him a career in the film industry for the next decade.

== Plot ==
Patriotic university student Youngwoo and his friends, led by their teacher Lee Sung, along with a British friend bid farewell to their families and become freedom fighters in Manchuria fighting against the Japanese occupation around the Tumen River.

== Bibliography ==
- "Dumanganga jal itgeola". The Complete Index to World Film. Archived from the original on 2011-07-20.
- "Farewell Tumen River (Dumangang-a Jal Itgeora) (1962)". Korean Movie Database (KMDb).
- James, David E.; Kim Kyung-hyun, eds. (2002). Im Kwon-Taek: The Making of a Korean National Cinema. Detroit: Wayne State University Press. ISBN 0-8143-2869-5.
