= Kang Soo-yeon =

South Korean actress (1966–2022)

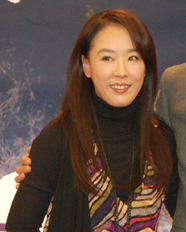
- Kang in 2009
- Born: August 18, 1966; Seoul, South Korea
- Died: May 7, 2022 (aged 55); Seoul, South Korea
- Other names: Kang Su-yeon, Kang Soo-youn
- Occupation: Actress
- Years active: 1969–2022

Korean name
- Hangul: 강수연
- Hanja: 姜受延
- RR: Gang Suyeon
- MR: Kang Suyŏn

Kang Soo-yeon (Korean: 강수연; August 18, 1966 – May 7, 2022) was a South Korean actress. An internationally acclaimed star from the mid-1980s to the end of the 1990s, she is often honorifically nicknamed Korea's "first world star".

Kang began her acting career as a child and gained national recognition with A High School Student's Diary on KBS 1TV (1983–1984), and the comedy films Whale Hunting 2 (1985) and Mimi and Cheolsu's Youth Sketch (1987). However, she would remain unknown outside her country until her breakout role in Im Kwon-taek's The Surrogate Woman (1987). (Note: The film was released in South Korea in 1987; however, some may state the release year as 1986, presumably when it was filmed.) She won the Volpi Cup for Best Actress at the 44th Venice International Film Festival for this role, making her the first Korean actor to receive an award at a major international film festival. In 1989, she received the Bronze St. George award at the 16th Moscow International Film Festival for Come Come Come Upward (1989), which further established her "world star" title.

From the early 2000s and onwards however, her output slowed significantly. Kang took years off between film appearances and switched to acting on the small screen, where she achieved moderate success for starring in Ladies of the Palace (2001–02) on SBS TV. Juri (2013) was the last film she performed in that was released during her lifetime. After a nine-year gap, she was set to return to film with the Netflix original Jung_E, directed by Yeon Sang-ho. The production, which finished filming in January 2022, was released after Kang's death in January 2023.

After collapsing from cerebral hemorrhage at her home in southern Seoul on May 5, 2022, Kang was transported to hospital and stayed in the ICU for recovery. She never awoke from the coma and died on May 7, 2022.

== Career ==
Kang began professionally acting as a child in 1969.

=== 1970s–1991 ===
As a child actress, Kang appeared in a number of low-profile movies and TV shows in the 1970s and 1980s.

Her career breakthrough happened when she took on a lead role as the vulnerable teenager Ok-nyo in the Im Kwon-taek-directed movie The Surrogate Woman. For the film, she was honored with the Volpi Cup for Best Actress award at the 1987 Venice International Film Festival as well as the Best Actress Award at the Nantes International Film Festival. The former achievement marked the first time a Korean actor, female or male, had been given an award at the major film festival. At the time, it was still considered shocking to many that South Korea even had a film industry.

Two years later, Come Come Come Upward, a Buddhist-themed movie also directed by Im, was released. In the film, Kang played the role of Sun-nyeo, a young student who seeks refuge in a monastery to escape from her troubled home; she studies to become a nun and later falls in love. Kang did, in fact, get her head shaved onscreen in the scene when Sun-nyeo becomes a nun. She personally felt proud of her performance—later stating she felt her ego was insignificant to her portrayal and that it was "natural for [Sun-nyeo] to shave her head", due to the character's wish to be a nun. Kang won the Bronze St. George at the 16th Moscow International Film Festival for her role in Come Come Come Upward, establishing further credit as Korea's "world star".

In the same year, she was invited to serve as a juror in the Tokyo International Film Festival. In addition, she later became a member of the jury for the 17th Moscow International Film Festival, in 1991.

=== 1990s ===
In the 1990s, Kang appeared in a number of movies, the most notable of which are Jang Sun-woo's Road to the Racetrack (1991), That Woman, That Man (1993) by Kim Ui-seok, Lee Myung-se's Their Last Love Affair (1996), and Im Sang-soo's debut, Girls' Night Out (1998). Road to the Racetrack won her several accolades for best actress at award ceremonies, including the Baeksang Arts Awards, Chunsa Film Art Awards, and the Blue Dragon Film Awards. That Woman, That Man was a commercial success at the box office, and she earned another Baeksang Arts Award for Most Popular Actress (her first being in 1990 for her performance in All That Falls Has Wings).

By the end of the decade, Kang had acted in 32 movies. After Rainbow Trout was released in 1999, she cut down her work in film and took to acting on television. The actress was invited to be a juror in the 5th Busan International Film Festival, in 2000.

=== 2000s ===
After a fifteen-year gap, Kang returned to television in 2001. She was given a starring role in Ladies of the Palace (여인 천하; Yeo-in cheon-ha), a historical drama that aired on SBS TV. The 150-episode series was successful, and it managed to garner her renewed visibility among mainstream audiences. Her performance as Jeong Nan-jeong enabled her to win a daesang, awarded by the channel.

After a hiatus from the movie scene, Kang made her comeback by playing the role of an attorney in The Circle. She then appeared in two more movies, Hanbando in 2006 and With a Girl of Black Soil in 2007. Hanbando received largely negative reviews. In 2007, she continued her foray into mainstream TV by acting in the drama miniseries Moonhee on MBC TV. On the show, she played the role of a woman who is forced to leave her child she had when she was only eighteen.

=== 2010s and 2020s ===
Throughout the 2010s, Kang only appeared in two films, one of which was Im Kwon-taek's Hanji (2011).

In 2015, she became the co-director for the Busan International Film Festival, but left the board two years later.

In 2022, Kang was given a starring role in Yeon Sang-ho's sci-fi action film Jung_E, set in the 22nd century. Filming began in November 2021 and concluded in January 2022. Kang played the role of a researcher at an AI lab who clones the brain of an elite soldier—her mother. The film was released globally on Netflix in January 2023, after Kang's death.

== Death ==
At 5:48 p.m. (KST) on May 5, 2022, Kang was found unconscious at her home in southern Seoul by first responders. They reported that she had suffered a cardiac arrest after collapsing from a cerebral hemorrhage. Immediately, she was transported to the local Gangnam Severance Hospital, where she was admitted to the ICU and became comatose.

After receiving two days of medical treatment at the hospital, Kang died at 3 p.m. on May 7, 2022. She was cremated at Seoul Memorial Park (Korean: 서울추모공원) and her ashes were buried at the Honor Stone (Korean: 용인공원) on May 11, 2022.

=== Reactions ===
Jeonju International Film Festival, which incidentally concluded on May 7, 2022, commemorated Kang's legacy through social media, writing: "The Jeonju International Film Festival commemorates the passing of the late actress Kang Soo-yeon, who was a shining star of Korean cinema. I will not forget the legacy she left in the Korean film industry."

== Filmography ==
=== Film ===
List of film appearances, with year, title, and role shown
Year	Title
1976	I Confess
1977	Three Stars
1978	Where Is My Mother?
1978	Good Bye, Sorrow!
1978	A Chorus of Pigeons
1979	Blood Relations
1979	A Letter from Heaven
1982	The Two Tomboys
1983	Promised Woman
1985	Whale Hunting 2
1985	W's Tragedy
1987	Now, We are Going to Geneva
1987	Potato
1987	The Surrogate Woman
1987	Mimi and Cheolsu's Youth Sketch
1987	King Yonsan
1987	Tohwa
1988	Miri, Mari, Uri, Duri
1988	Karma
1989	Come Come Come Upward
1989	Shock Continues Long
1990	All That Falls Has Wings
1991	Autumn Tempest
1991	Berlin Report
1991	Road to the Racetrack
1992	The Blue in You
1993	Western Avenue
1993	That Woman, That Man
1994	Rosy Days
1995	Go Alone Like a Rhino's Horn
1996	Their Last Love Affair
1997	Black Jack
1997	Deep Sorrow
1998	Girls' Night Out
1999	Rainbow Trout
2003	The Circle
2006	Hanbando
2007	With a Girl of Black Soil
2011	Hanji
2013	Juri
2023	Jung_E

=== Television ===
List of film appearances, with year, title, and role shown
Year(s)	Title
1971	The Adventures of Ttolttol-yi
1979	Oseong and Haneum
1980	Jang Yeong-sil, the Wind Boy
1983–84	A High School Student's Diary
1985	Mother's Room
1986	TV Literary Theater
2001	Ladies of the Palace
2007	Moonhee

== Accolades ==
=== Awards and nominations ===
Year	Award	Category	Nominated work	Result
1984	20th Baeksang Arts Awards	Best New Actress	Diary of a High School Student	Won
1987	26th Grand Bell Awards	Best Actress	Now, We are Going to Geneva	Won
1987	44th Venice International Film Festival	Volpi Cup for Best Actress	The Surrogate Woman	Won
1987	Asian Film Festival	Best Actress	The Surrogate Woman	Won
1987	9th Three Continents Festival	Best Actress	The Surrogate Woman	Won
1989	27th Grand Bell Awards	Best Actress	Come Come Come Upward	Won
1989	16th Moscow International Film Festival	Best Actress	Come Come Come Upward	Won
1989	9th Korean Association of Film Critics Awards	Best Actress	Come Come Come Upward	Won
1990	10th Korean Association of Film Critics Awards	Best Actress	All That Falls Has Wings	Won
1990	28th Grand Bell Awards	Best Actress	All That Falls Has Wings	Won
1990	26th Baeksang Arts Awards	Best Actress (Film)	All That Falls Has Wings	Won
1990	11th Blue Dragon Film Awards	Best Leading Actress	All That Falls Has Wings	Nominated
1992	3rd Chunsa Film Art Awards	Best Actress	The Road to Racetrack	Won
1992	13th Blue Dragon Film Awards	Best Leading Actress	The Road to Racetrack	Won
1992	28th Baeksang Arts Awards	Best Actress (Film)	The Road to Racetrack	Won
1993	31st Grand Bell Awards	Best Actress	Blue in You	Nominated
1993	14th Blue Dragon Film Awards	Best Leading Actress	Blue in You	Nominated
1994	30th Baeksang Arts Awards	Most Popular Actress	That Woman, That Man	Won
1994	15th Blue Dragon Film Awards	Best Leading Actress	Rosy Days	Nominated
1995	16th Blue Dragon Film Awards	Best Leading Actress	Go Alone Life a Rhino's Horn	Nominated
1996	17th Blue Dragon Film Awards	Best Leading Actress	Their Last Love Affair	Nominated
1997	18th Blue Dragon Film Awards	Best Leading Actress	Deep Blue	Nominated
1999	20th Blue Dragon Film Awards	Best Leading Actress	Rainbow Trout	Nominated
2000	36th Baeksang Arts Awards	Best Actress (Film)	Rainbow Trout	Won
2000	37th Grand Bell Awards	Best Actress	Rainbow Trout	Nominated
2001	SBS Drama Awards	Grand Prize (Daesang)	Ladies of the Palace	Won
2001	SBS Drama Awards	Top 10 Stars	Ladies of the Palace	Won
2001	Grimae Awards	Best Actress	Ladies of the Palace	Won
2002	38th Baeksang Arts Awards	Best Actress (TV)	Ladies of the Palace	Nominated
2015	Women in Film Korea Festival	Woman in Film of the Year	—N/a	Won
2022	9th Korean Film Producers Association Award	Special achievement award	—N/a	Won

=== State honors ===
Name of country, year given, and name of honor
Country	Year	Honor Or Award	Ref.
South Korea (Note: Honors are given at the Korean Popular Culture and Arts Awards, arranged by the Korea Creative Content Agency and hosted by the Ministry of Culture, Sports and Tourism. They are awarded to those who have contributed to the arts and South Korea's pop culture.)	2022	Order of Cultural Merit, 2nd Class	

=== Listicles ===
Name of publisher, year listed, name of listicle, and placement
Publisher	Year	Listicle	Placement	Ref.
Korean Film Council	2021	Korean Actors 200 (Note: Introduces 200 actors that best represent the present and future of Korean cinema to people in the film industry all over the world)	Included	

== See also ==
- Contemporary culture of South Korea
- List of South Korean actresses
