= The Surrogate Woman =

- Theatrical poster to The Surrogate Woman
- Hangul: 씨받이
- RR: Ssibaji
- MR: Ssibaji
- Directed by: Im Kwon-taek
- Written by: Song Gil-han
- Produced by: Jeong Do-hwan
- Starring: Kang Soo-yeon; Lee Gu-sun; Yun Yang-ha
- Cinematography: Ku Jung-mo
- Edited by: Park Sun-duk
- Music by: Shin Pyong-ha
- Distributed by: Shin Han Films
- Release date: 21 March 1987
- Running time: 100 minutes
- Country: South Korea
- Language: Korean
- Box office: $2,034

The Surrogate Woman (Korean: 씨받이; RR: Ssibaji; also known as The Surrogate Womb or The Surrogate Mother) is a 1987 film directed by Im Kwon-taek, dealing with the love affair between a rich aristocrat and a poor servant during the Joseon period.

The film won multiple accolades at the 1987 Asian Film Festival, including Best Film, Best Director, Best Actress, and Best Supporting Actress. Lead actress Kang Soo-yeon was widely acclaimed in her role as the surrogate mother, for which she won Best Actress at the 1987 Venice Film Festival. The film also became a major box office hit in Taiwan when it was released in early 1988, arguably the first ever Korean cultural export in the island prior to the 1990s Hallyu explosion.

== Plot ==
Shin, a nobleman, has been trying to conceive a male heir to continue his family name. Unable to provide a male heir, Shin's wife gives her husband permission to search for a surrogate wife to bear a male heir. On the way to finding a surrogate wife, Shin runs into a 17-year-old girl, Ok-nyo (Kang Soo-yeon). She is a poor, but feisty, girl who states that she will do anything for money. The stubborn nature of Ok-nyo attracts Shin and influences him to choose her to become the mother of his child. Ok-nyo holds the social status of a servant, but the relationship changes both of them through the course of the movie. Ok-nyo has to obey rules which keep her hidden during the day and delegates her to perform the mating ritual during Shin’s wife's hours of choosing. No matter what is happening, Ok-nyo can not leave the building in which she is housed. With Shin's infatuation and Ok-nyo's attachment, both secretly meet for passionate affairs. Unfortunately both eventually get caught, which causes their separation. Ok-nyo's mother tries to dissuade her, and to break off the relationship, by telling her the realities of life. Even though both are punished for the infraction, they still continue to meet. Eventually Ok-nyo conceives an heir for Shin, but is burdened with not knowing whether Shin will stay by her side or leave with her child forever.

== Remake ==
The film inspired 1989 Malayalam film Dasharatham.
