= Kim Soo-chul =

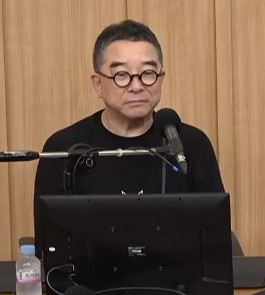

Background information
- Born: April 7, 1957 (age 69)
- Origin: South Korea
- Occupations: Singer, musician, composer
- Instrument: Guitar
- Years active: 1978–present
- Website: kimsoochul.com

Korean name
- Hangul: 김수철
- Hanja: 金秀哲
- RR: Gim Sucheol
- MR: Kim Such'ŏl

Kim Soo-chul (Korean: 김수철; born April 7, 1957) is a South Korean singer, musician, and composer. He began his career in the late 1970s as a rock singer and musician, later releasing "modernized" traditional Korean music, and composing numerous film scores.

== Early life ==
Kim Soo-chul was born on April 7, 1957, in South Korea. When Soo-chul was young, he loved to play many instruments and practiced ten hours a day. While in high school, he performed with the trio Fire Fox. In 1977, he was accepted to Kwangwoon University, where he formed the quartet "Little Big Man", with fellow students Kim Jang Won-mo (bass), Choir Soo-ill (drums), and Keung-Sung (keyboards). In 1978, as "Little Big Man", he attended a national college campus festival contest conference and received the grand prize with the song, "Seven Colored Rainbow." Because of this, the group "Little Big Man", became known to the public. Kim Soo-chul and his group members played a high-energy fusion of rock, jazz, folk, and soul music. In 1981, "Little Big Man" disbanded following their graduation.

== Career ==
=== 1983–1984: Best Singer of the Year ===
After "Little Big Man" disbanded, Soo-chul worked for his career as a soloist. He released his debut solo album, Little Giant, in August 1983. The album included the songs, "The One Flower That Could Not Bloom" and "I Will Not Fall in Love Again". By this album, the Korean Broadcasting System named him Best Singer of the Year in 1984, and won 16 other prizes.

=== 1987–1990: Success and failure ===
Soo-chul composed the traditional dance piece "The World of Spirits" in 1987. It was performed by dance troupe Kim Hun Hee, and won the grand prize at the ninth annual Korean Dance Festival. After receiving the prize, Soo-chul was inspired to record his first album of traditional music. The album was a major flop. However, label Seoul Records, which Soo-chul was included, stopped distribution because it failed to sell more than 200 copies. After the failure, he tried to record additional traditional albums, but none of them produced a good result.

=== 1990–present: Purpose ===
During 1990 he toured with a stage show, Guitar Sanjo, that combined his electric guitar playing with a traditional group. In 2002, he released a Korea-Japan World Cup opening song in 2002. Even though he received many hardships, he continued to work for his goal which was "to introduce the sound of traditional Korean music to a global audience."

== Discography ==
- Sori for Invocation
- Tae-Baek-San-Maek
- Guitar Sanjo (2002, Living Sound Productions)
- Pops & Rock (2002, Living Sound Productions)

== Film Scores ==
- Whale Hunting (고래사냥) (1984), in which he also starred.
- The Dirty Mob (중광의 허튼소리) (a.k.a. Nonsense of Jung-Kwang, 1986)
- Place in the Sun (1988)
- Chilsu and Mansu (1988)
- Black Republic (1990)
- Silver Stallion (1991)
- Kyongmachang Kanungil (1992)
- Sopyonje (1993)
- The Taebaek Mountains (1994)
- My Dear Keum-hong (금홍아 금홍아) (1995), in which he also starred.
- Festival (1996)
- Downfall (1997)
- Blades of Blood (2010)
- Hanji (2011), directed by Im Kwon-taek

Additional titles are listed in Imdb.com entry.

== See also ==
- Korean music
- List of South Korean musicians
- List of North Korean musicians
