= 1993 Shanghai International Film Festival =

Chinese film festival

The 1st Shanghai International Film Festival was the inaugural film festival of the now A-grade Shanghai International Film Festival (SIFF). It was held for one week in Shanghai between October 7 and October 14, 1993. The festival saw participation of 167 films from 33 countries and 300,000 attendees. Shanghai Film Art Center was the primary main venue with an additional eight secondary venues.

== Jury ==
- Xie Jin (China)
- Oliver Stone (U.S.)
- Nagisa Oshima (Japan)
- Tsui Hark (Hong Kong)
- Paul Cox (Australia)
- Karen Shakhnazarov (Russia)

== In competition ==
- The Appointed (director Daniel Wachsmann) (Israel)
- Ask Yourself (director Pak Jong Jun) (North Korea)
- The Banishment (director Mehmet Tanrisever) (Turkey)
- Beck (director Jacob Biji) (Netherlands/Belgium)
- Cageman (director Jacob Cheung) (Hong Kong)
- The Cherry Orchard (director Antonello Aglioti) (Italy)
- Country Teachers (director He Qun) (China)
- Cultivating Cruelty in Women and Dogs (Russia)
- Daens (director Stijn Coninx) (Belgium)
- Desencuentros (director Leandro Manfrini) (Switzerland)
- Duett (director Saver Schwarzenberger) (Austria)
- Enchanted April (director Mike Newell) (United Kingdom)
- Jack the Bear (director Marshall Herskovitz) (United States of America)
- Mothers and Daughters (director Larry Kent) (Canada)
- Resurrection Morning (director Takeshi Yoshida) (Japan)
- The Hill of No Return (director Tong Wang) (Taiwan)
- Shotgun Wedding (director Paul Harmon) (Australia)
- Sofie (director Liv Ullmann) (Norway/Sweden/Denmark)
- Sopyonje (director Im Kwon-Taek) (South Korea)
- Surigudu (director Desari Narayana Rao) (India)

== Awards ==
=== Golden Goblet Awards ===
- Best Film - Hill of No Return (Dir. Wang T'ung, Taiwan)
- Best Director - Im Kwon-Taek for Sopyonje (South Korea)
- Best Actor - Jan Decleir for Daens (Belgium)
- Best Actress - Oh Jung Hae for Sopyonje (South Korea)

=== Special jury award ===
- Cageman (Dir. Jacob Cheung, Hong Kong)
