= To the Starry Island =

- Poster for To the Starry Island (1993)
- Hangul: 그 섬에 가고싶다
- RR: Geu seome gagosipda
- MR: Kŭ sŏme kagosipta
- Directed by: Park Kwang-su
- Written by: Lee Chang-dong; Im Chul-woo; Park Kwang-su
- Produced by: Park Kwang-su
- Starring: Ahn Sung-ki; Moon Sung-keun
- Cinematography: Yoo Young-gil
- Edited by: Kim Hyeon
- Music by: Song Hong-seop
- Distributed by: Park Kwang-su Film
- Release date: December 25, 1993 (South Korea)
- Running time: 102 minutes
- Country: South Korea
- Language: Korean
- Box office: $195

To the Starry Island (Korean: 그 섬에 가고싶다; RR: Geu seome gagosipda) is a 1993 South Korean film directed by Park Kwang-su.

== Plot ==
According to his father's wishes, Moon Jae-Goo attempts to bury his father's body on the island on which he was born. Because of bitter memories of his father's political past during wartime, the villagers refuse to allow his burial. Kim Cheol, Moon's poet friend, attempts to persuade the villagers to change their minds while Moon recalls his past life on the island and his relationships with four local women.

== Cast ==
- Ahn Sung-ki as Kim Cheol
- Moon Sung-keun as Moon Jae-Goo/Moon Duck-Bae
- Shim Hye-jin as Oknimi
- Ahn So-young as Bulttoknyo
- Lee Yong-yi as Upsoonne
- Kim Yong-man
- Huh Joon-ho
- Kim Il-woo
- Min Kyoung-jin
- Park Bu-yang

== Reception ==
To the Starry Island had received a positive review from Time Out, which called the film "fascinating, with a bold, shocking climax".

== Awards ==
- Three Continents Festival (1994): Audience Award

== Bibliography ==
- Rooney, David (1994-07-15). "To the Starry Island". Variety.
