= Jung E =

2023 film by Yeon Sang-ho

Jung_E
- Promotional poster
- Hangul: 정이
- RR: Jeongi
- MR: Chŏngi
- Directed by: Yeon Sang-ho
- Written by: Yeon Sang-ho
- Produced by: Byun Seung-min
- Starring: Kang Soo-yeon; Kim Hyun-joo; Ryu Kyung-soo
- Edited by: Yang Jin-mo
- Music by: Kim Dong-wook
- Production companies: Climax Studio; Dexter Studio
- Distributed by: Netflix
- Release date: January 20, 2023
- Running time: 99 minutes
- Country: South Korea
- Language: Korean
- Budget: KRW20 billion; (est. $16.3 million)

Jung_E (Korean: 정이), stylised as JUNG_E, is a 2023 South Korean science fiction film written and directed by Yeon Sang-ho, starring Kang Soo-yeon, Kim Hyun-joo, and Ryu Kyung-soo. The film features the final film appearance of Kang Soo-yeon, who died ahead of its release. A dedication to her appears at the end of the film. It premiered on January 20, 2023, on Netflix.

== Plot ==
Jung_E portrays a desolated Earth in the year 2135 that is no longer habitable due to the rise of the sea level caused by climate change. Humans decide to move to space. After building 80 shelters between Earth and the Moon's orbital planes, they spend decades migrating citizens to the shelters. As the humans settle in, shelters number 8, 12 and 13, declare themselves as the Adrian Republic and they begin attacking Earth and the other shelters. This leads to decades of war between the Allied Forces and the Adrian Republic. Humans left on Earth continue to produce munitions, living like cogs of the machine that is war.

Captain Yun Jung-yi is a legendary mercenary of the Allied Forces who led her team to countless successful missions against the Adrian Republic. She has a little daughter, Yun Seo-hyun, who suffers from a lung tumor, and Jung-yi became a mercenary to afford her daughter's medical treatments. The day Seo-hyun gets the surgery, Jung-yi fails her mission and ends up in a coma. Kronoid, an institute in charge of developing AI technologies, convinces her family to agree to clone her brain, promising that they will cover Jung-yi's treatments, her daughter's education and living expenses.

Thirty-five years later in 2194, Kronoid clones Jung-yi's brain to develop an AI mercenary, code-named Jung_E. Dr. Yun Seo-hyun is the team leader of research project Jung_E and seeks to memorialize Jung-yi as a hero rather than a failure. Researchers at Kronoid have copied Jung-yi's brain data and put them in Android bodies. Through simulations of Jung-yi's final mission, they try to extract combat memory data that could be used to develop an exceptional combat AI. Just like Captain Jung-yi failed her last mission, AI JUNG_E also fails in every simulation of the last mission.

Seo-hyun learns that her childhood cancer has returned, and she only has three months left to live. She also learns through the chairman of Kronoid that there is no need to develop combat AI anymore because the Adrian Republic and Allied Forces are entering a treaty. With peace approaching, the company has decided to focus on household services. Seo-hyun discovers one of her team members with a scantily clad Jung_E robot in his apartment, but he claims that Kronoid has tasked him with investigating using the Jung_E models as sex robots. After the last simulation of project Jung_E, Seo-hyun escapes the facility with a Jung_E robot while other combat robots and security forces chase them. Kim Sang-Hoon, the project's director, is revealed to also be a robot with an AI brain. Kim shoots Seo-hyun as she and the Jung_E robot flee via elevated rail. The Jung_E robot fights him off, and he is destroyed when his part of the train falls to the ground. Seo-hyun urges Jung_E to leave her and survive. After surprising Seo-hyun by showing affection, Jung_E escapes and looks around on top of a rock in a mountain range.

== Cast ==
=== Main ===
- Kang Soo-yeon as Yun Seo-hyun
  - Park So-yi as young Yun Seo-hyun

The team leader at Kronoid Laboratory, the research institute responsible for JUNG_E's clones and combat power tests. She is the daughter of Captain Yun Jung-yi, who entered a coma when Yun Seo-hyun was a child.

- Kim Hyun-joo as Yun Jung-yi/JUNG_E

Captain Yun Jung-yi was a leader of the Allied Forces and was once considered a war hero. During her last mission, she is critically injured and ends up in a coma. Decades later in 2194, her brain data is cloned and used to develop an advanced combat AI, codenamed JUNG_E.

- Ryu Kyung-soo as Kim Sang-Hoon

He is the director of Kronoid Laboratory and is driven to succeed in the brain cloning experiment. He is a robot created by the chairman of Kronoid Laboratory that believes himself to be human.

=== Special appearance ===
- Lee Dong-hee as the chairman of Kronoid Laboratory
- Uhm Ji-won as Lee Se-yeon

== Production ==
Kim Hyun-joo and Ryu Kyung-soo also appeared in director Yeon Sang-ho's previous work, 2021 Netflix series Hellbound.

=== Filming ===
Filming began in November 2021 and concluded in January 2022.

== Reception ==
=== Audience response ===
A day later after its release, Jung_E took the first place globally on Netflix's film category. Subsequently it debuted at the first place in Netflix's global Top 10 movie (non-English) category for the week of January 16 to 22, entering the Top 10 list in a total of 80 countries and recording 19 million hours viewed.

=== Critical response ===
Jung_E received "mixed or average reviews" on Metacritic. The site rated it 53/100 based on five reviews. On Rotten Tomatoes, 50% of 24 surveyed critics gave the film a positive review, and the average rating was 5.5/10.

Reviewing for NME, Hidzir Junaini graded the film with 3 stars out of 5 and described the film as "extremely streamlined, contained almost entirely within the A.I. research lab, and focused on a heartrending mother-daughter relationship." Junaini praised the performance of Kang Soo-yeon and Kim Hyun-joo as well as the action sequences, VFX designs, CGI, and practical effects. Rohan Naahar writing for The Indian Express rated the film with 3 out of 5, appreciating the storyline and criticizing the premise.
