= Gilsotteum =

1986 film by Im Kwon-taek

- Film poster
- Hangul: 길소뜸
- RR: Gilsotteum
- MR: Kilsottŭm
- Directed by: Im Kwon-taek
- Written by: Song Gil-han
- Produced by: Park Jong-chan
- Starring: Kim Ji-mee; Shin Seong-il
- Cinematography: Jung Il-sung
- Edited by: Park Soon-duk
- Music by: Kim Jung-gil
- Distributed by: Hwa Chun Trading Company
- Release date: 5 April 1986
- Running time: 105 minutes
- Country: South Korea
- Language: Korean

Gilsotteum is a 1986 South Korean drama film directed by Im Kwon-taek. It was entered into the 36th Berlin International Film Festival.

== Plot ==
In 1983, KBS launched a campaign to reunite families torn apart in the Korean War three decades earlier. In an expert dissection of the social and familial rifts in modern Korea, director Im Kwon-taek integrates footage from the campaign into the story of Hwa-yeong, who leaves her middle-class life in Busan to search for the son she lost in Gilsotteum during the war.

== Cast ==
- Kim Ji-mee as Hwa-yeong
- Shin Seong-il as Dong-jin
- Han Ji-il
- Kim Ji-young
- Lee Sang-a

== Production ==
In this film, Lee Sang-a has brief love scenes and a full rear nude shot. The actress, who was 13 or 14 years old during filming, revealed in 2015 that she was forced to do the nude scene by director Im Kwon-taek.
