= Hanshin University =

University in Osan, South Korea

Coordinates: 37°19′37″N 127°02′29″E

- 한신대학교
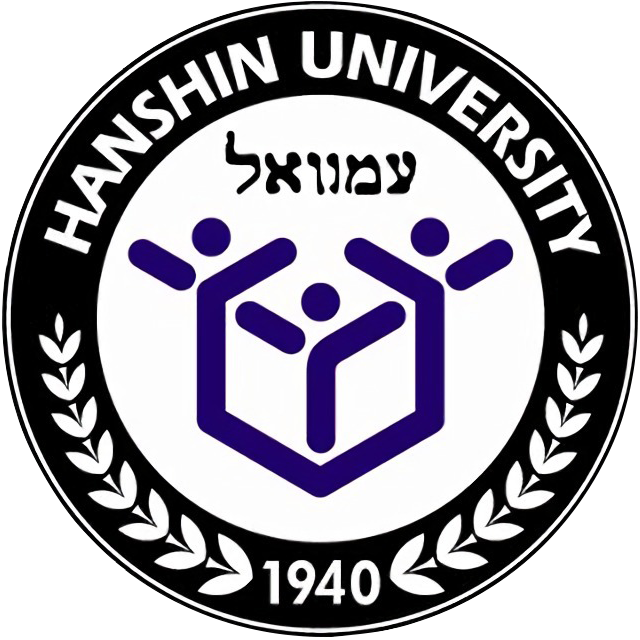
- Type: Private
- Established: 1939
- Location: Osan, Gyeonggi Province, South Korea
- Website: www.hs.ac.kr

Korean name
- Hangul: 한신대학교
- Hanja: 韓神大學校
- RR: Hansin daehakgyo
- MR: Hansin taehakkyo

Hanshin University (Korean: 한신대학교) is a private university in Osan, in the Seoul National Capital Area of South Korea. Established in 1939, it is affiliated with the Presbyterian Church in the Republic of Korea. Hanshin University was formerly a theological seminary and became a university in 1980. It currently offers undergraduate and post-graduate degree programs as well as modules for continuing education.

== Notable people ==
- Kang Won-yong, Pastor, Theologian, Activist
- Ham Tae-young, Former Vice President of the Republic of Korea
- Moon Ik-hwan, Pastor, Poet, Activist
- Chang Chun-ha, Activist, Politician, Journalist
- Choe Dooseok, Poet

== See also ==
- List of colleges and universities in South Korea
- Education in South Korea
