= All That Falls Has Wings =

- Theatrical poster for All That Falls Has Wings (1990)
- Hangul: 추락하는 것은 날개가 있다
- Hanja: 墜落하는 것은 날개가 있다
- RR: Churakhaneun geoseun nalgaega itda
- MR: Ch'urakhanŭn kŏsŭn nalgaega itta
- Directed by: Jang Gil-su
- Written by: Yoon Dae-sung; Jang Gil-su; Lee Jong-hak
- Produced by: Lee Ji-ryong; Lee Jeong-ju
- Starring: Kang Soo-yeon; Son Chang-min
- Cinematography: Lee Suck-ki
- Edited by: Kim Hee-su
- Music by: Shin Byung-ha
- Distributed by: Danam Enterprises Co., Ltd.
- Release date: January 26, 1990
- Running time: 122 minutes
- Country: South Korea
- Language: Korean

All That Falls Has Wings (Korean: 추락하는 것은 날개가 있다) is a 1990 South Korean film directed by Jang Gil-su. Among many other honors, it was awarded Best Film at the Grand Bell Awards ceremony.

== Plot ==
This youth melodrama tells the story of a law student from a small village in Korea, and the irresponsible girl with whom he falls in love. The girl leads a reckless life, working in bars in Itaewon, and the U.S., while the law student follows her. Their relationship ends in tragedy with the man shooting the woman, and her confessing her true love before dying.

== Cast ==
- Kang Soo-yeon
- Son Chang-min
- Choi Min-sik
- Lee Hyo-jung
- An Hye-ri
- Lee Nak-hoon
- Moon Mi-bong
- Lee Jong-man
- Kim Jeong-rim
- Kim Ju-eon
- Kim Ji-young

Preceded by Come Come Come Upward	Grand Bell Awards for Best Film; 1990	Succeeded by Passion Portrait
