= Moon Ik-hwan =

South Korean pastor and pro-reunification activist

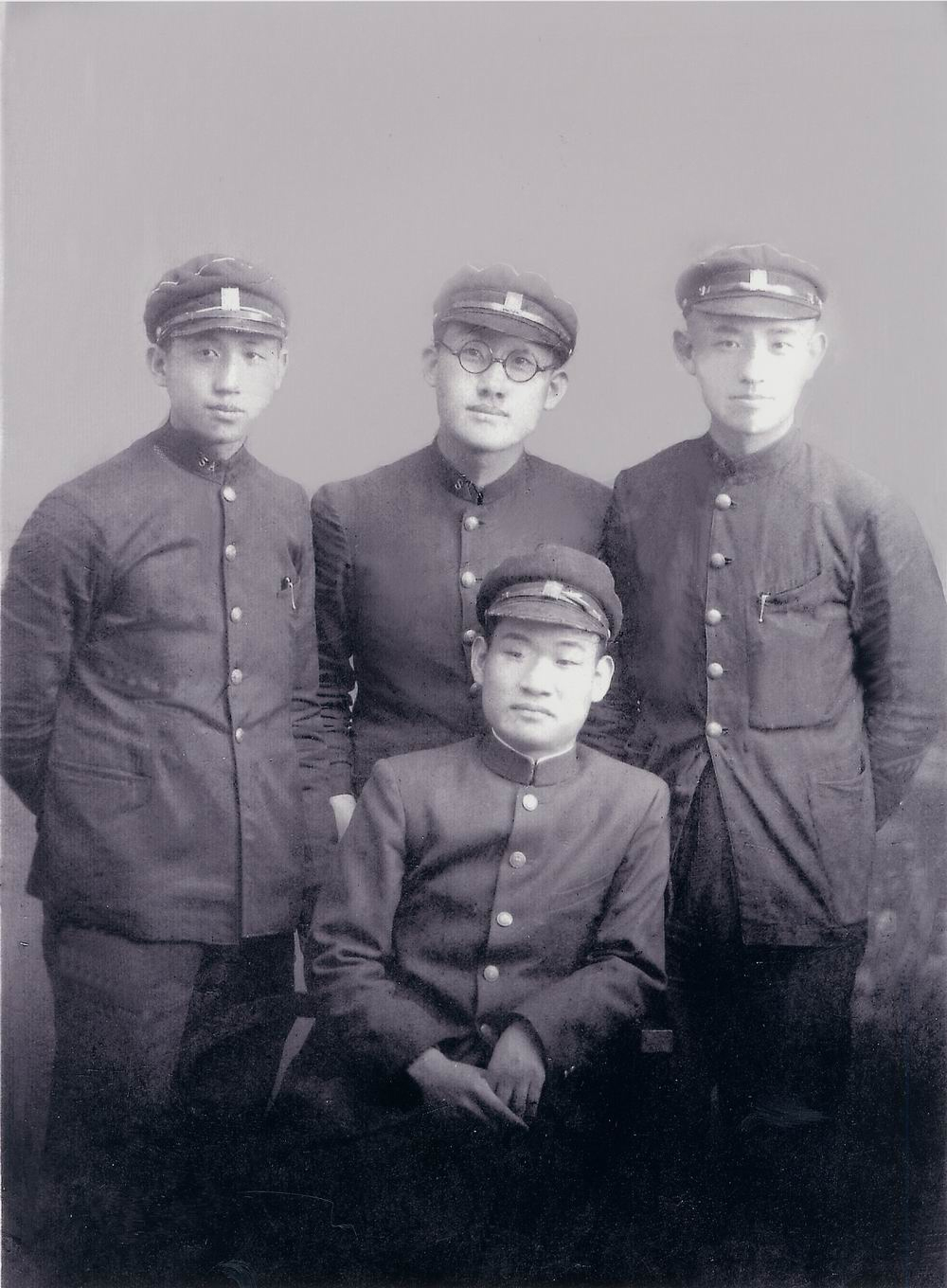
- Moon Ik-hwan and Friends

Korean name
- Hangul: 문익환
- Hanja: 文益換
- RR: Mun Ikhwan
- MR: Mun Ikhwan

Moon Ik-hwan (June 2, 1918 – January 18, 1994) was a South Korean pastor, theologian, poet, and activist engaged in various social movements. He was also the father of Moon Sung-keun, a noted actor in South Korea.

== Early life and education ==
He was born in Longjing, Jilin as the first son of the Reverend, Moon Jae-rin and mother, Shin Sin-muk. He had two brothers and two sisters. He and his brother became pastors. He was raised in Bukgando where Korean independence movement was centered. After finishing up education at Myeongdong Elementary school and Eunjin Middle school that ethnic Koreans established, Moon went to Sungsil Middle School in Pyongyang, and then Yongjeong Gwangmyeong School in Bukgando. Although Moon Ik-hwan entered Tokyo Union Theological Seminary in Japan, he was dismissed from the school because of his refusal to enlist himself to Japanese army. He then transferred to Bongcheon Seminary (봉천신학교) in Manchuria and served as a preacher at a Korean church. In 1947, he graduated Hansin University and received the imposition of hands. After he earned his master's degree from Princeton Theological Seminary in the United States, he returned to South Korea and began to lecture the Old Testament at Yonsei University and Hanshin University. Later, he worked on translating the Old Testament until he devoted himself on unification of the two Koreas and democracy of South Korea.

== Career ==
Moon worked as the main chief for the translation on the Old Testament by a joint collaboration of the Protestant and Catholic church in South Korea for 8 years. Moon was imprisoned in 1976 for dissident activities and again in 1986 for his alleged encouragement of student activists at Seoul National University and his leadership in the protest at Inch'on in May of that year. (3·1민주구국선언). According to the New York Times:

Moon was jailed five times, for a total of 10 years, for dissident activities. In the spring of 1993 he was released early from a five-year sentence for making an unapproved visit to North Korea, where he spoke with leaders about the possibility of unification, in 1989. South Korean law bars contacts with Communists without prior approval.
