= Nam Yeong-sin =

South Korean handball player (born 1990)

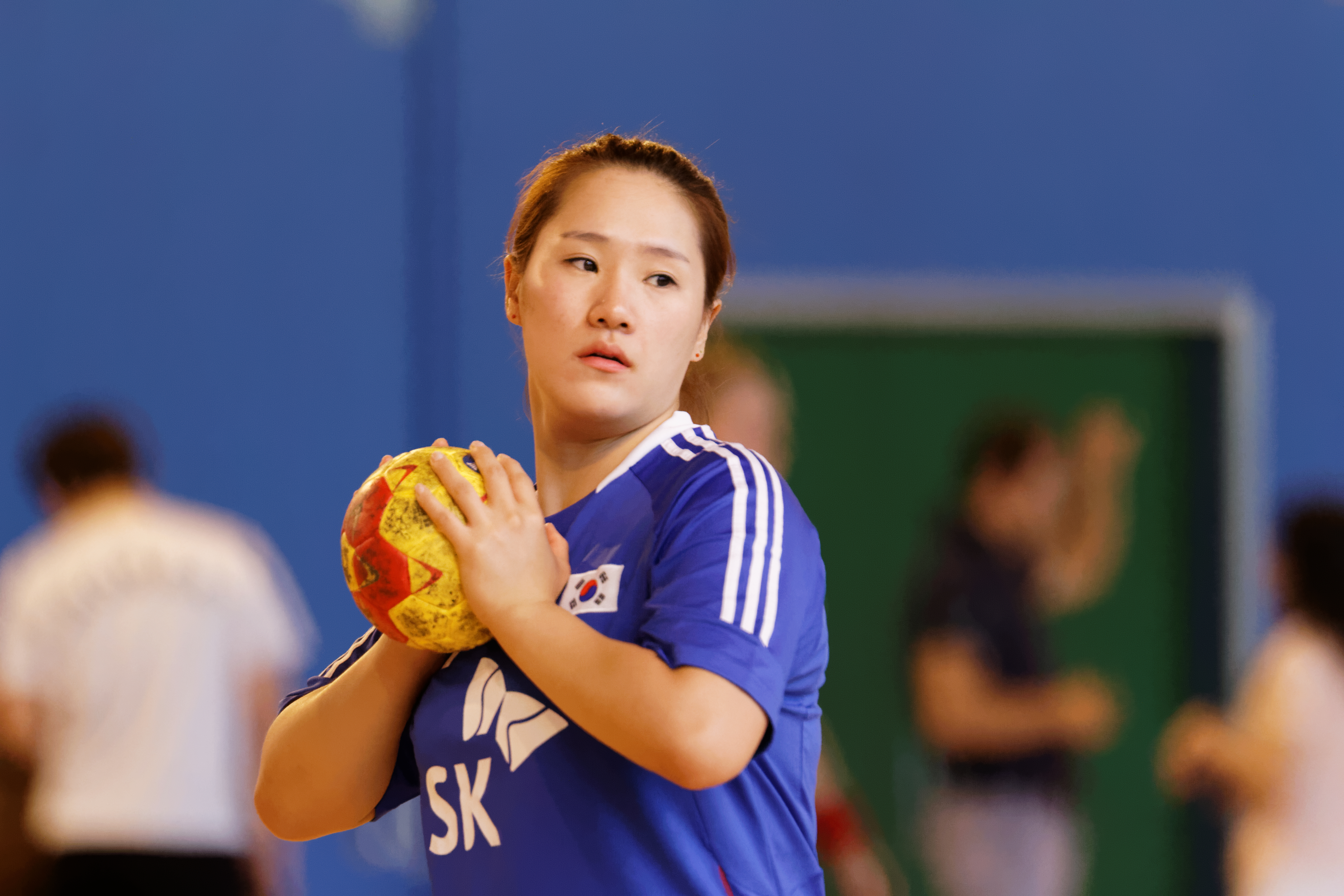

Personal information
- Nationality: South Korean
- Born: 27 August 1990 (age 36) Changwon, South Korea
- Height: 1.75 m (5 ft 9 in)

Sport
- Sport: Handball
- Position: Pivot
- Current club: BISCO
National team
| Years | Team | Apps | (Gls) |
| – | South Korea | 25 | (3) |
Medal record
Asian Championship
| Gold medal – first place | 2018 Japan |

- Nam Yeong-sin
- Hangul: 남영신
- RR: Nam Yeongsin
- MR: Nam Yŏngsin

Nam Yeong-sin (born 27 August 1990) is a South Korean handball player for BISCO and the South Korean Republic national team. As member of the national team she competed at the 2016 Summer Olympics in Rio de Janeiro.
