= Lee Dong-soo (footballer) =

South Korean footballer

Personal information
- Full name: Lee Dong-soo
- Date of birth: 3 June 1994 (age 32)
- Place of birth: Daegu, South Korea
- Height: 1.85 m (6 ft 1 in)
- Position: Defensive midfielder

Team information
- Current team: Busan IPark
- Number: 6

Youth career
- 2012–2014: Daejeon Citizen
- 2014–2015: Kwandong University

Senior career*
Years	Team	Apps	(Gls)
2016	Daejeon Citizen	36	(1)
2017–2021	Jeju United	65	(2)
2020–2021	→ Sangju / Gimcheon Sangmu (army)	18	(0)
2022–2023	Incheon United	37	(1)
2023	→ FC Anyang (loan)	16	(3)
2024–	Busan IPark	82	(6)
- * Club domestic league appearances and goals as of 5 August 2026

Lee Dong-soo (Korean: 이동수; born 3 June 1994) is a South Korean footballer who plays as a defensive midfielder for Busan IPark.

== Career ==
Lee signed with Daejeon Citizen in January 2016.
