= Black Republic =

- Poster for Black Republic (1990)
- Hangul: 그들도 우리처럼
- Lit.: They Also Are Like Us
- RR: Geudeuldo uricheoreom
- MR: Kŭdŭldo urich'ŏrŏm
- Directed by: Park Kwang-su
- Written by: Yoon Dae-sung; Kim Sung-su; Park Kwang-su
- Produced by: Lee Woo-suk
- Starring: Moon Sung-keun; Park Joong-hoon
- Cinematography: You Young-gil
- Edited by: Kim Hyeon
- Music by: Kim Soo-chul
- Distributed by: Dong A Exports Co., Ltd.
- Release date: November 10, 1990 (South Korea)
- Running time: 100 minutes
- Country: South Korea
- Language: Korean
- Box office: $646

Black Republic (Korean: 그들도 우리처럼; RR: Geudeuldo uricheoreom; lit. 'They Also Are Like Us') is a 1990 South Korean film directed by Park Kwang-su.

== Plot ==
A social drama about a young student activist who hides from the authorities by working in a small mining town.

== Cast ==
- Moon Sung-keun as Kim Ki-young
- Park Joong-hoon as Lee Seon-cheol
- Shim Hye-jin as Song Young-sook
- Hwang Hae as Shim
- Park Gyu-chae as Lee Sa-jang
- Lee Ill-woong as Jeong
- Yang Jin-yeong as Dae-shik
- Kim Min-hee as Mi-sook
- Kim Kyung-ran as Taek-i's mother
- Cho Ju-mi as Soon-i's mother

== Awards ==
- Blue Dragon Film Awards (1990) Best Film
- Singapore International Film Festival (1991) Silver Screen Award for Best Asian Feature Film

== Bibliography ==
- Kim, Kyung-hyun (2004). "5. New Korean Cinema Auteurs: Male Crisis in the Early Films of Park Kwang-su: Black Republic". The Remasculinization of Korean Cinema. Durham and London: Duke University Press. pp. 151–160. ISBN 0-8223-3267-1.
