= Chilsu and Mansu =

- Poster for Chilsu and Mansu (1988)
- Hangul: 칠수와 만수
- RR: Chilsuwa Mansu
- MR: Ch'ilsuwa Mansu
- Directed by: Park Kwang-su
- Written by: Choe In-seok; Chi Sang-hak; Yi Sang-woo
- Produced by: Lee Woo-suk
- Starring: Ahn Sung-ki; Park Joong-hoon
- Cinematography: You Young-gil
- Edited by: Kim Hyeon
- Music by: Kim Soo-chul
- Distributed by: Dong-a Exports Co. Ltd.
- Release date: November 26, 1988 (South Korea)
- Running time: 108 minutes
- Country: South Korea
- Language: Korean

Chilsu and Mansu (Korean: 칠수와 만수) is a 1988 South Korean comedy-drama film and noted director Park Kwang-su's debut film. Though not a box-office hit (only attracting 73,751 people in theatres), the film is remembered as a major step towards freedom of expression in South Korean cinema.

Chilsu and Mansu was the directorial debut of Park Kwang-su, who went on to become a director and a role model for a new generation of socially conscious filmmakers. The film is one of the performances by two actors, Ahn Sung-ki and Park Joong-hoon. The onscreen camaraderie shown by the two men foreshadowed their being cast together again in the hit comedy Two Cops (1993) and the action/art film Nowhere to Hide (1999). Bae Jong-ok, who plays Chil-su's girlfriend, later had a role in the award-winning Jealousy Is My Middle Name (2003).

== Background ==
1988 was the year of the Seoul Olympics and a time of great political and social change for South Korea. Massive street protests against the military government and on behalf of workers' rights had recently reached their peak. Korean society portrayed through cinema in those days, however, hardly resembled the passion on display on the streets. Government censors, wielding an iron grip over the film industry, ensured that the slightest hint of social criticism was clipped in the screenplay or in the editing room before reaching audiences.

Chilsu and Mansu seemingly depict the hopes and aspirations of Korean youth in the late 1980s when the country was gradually democratizing. As the film progresses, however, the storyline does not turn out as the audience expects and ends with a standoff between the protagonists and the establishment.

The movie was based o short story "Liang Ge Youqijiang," written by Huang Chunmingt was uncredited because Huang's works were banned in South Korea at the time.

== Summary ==
Two men, Chilsu and Mansu, are both painters without stable jobs who lead pointless lives marked by desperation and lack of employment. The film sends many messages to the viewer, of which the most poignant is the daily struggle of the common man in 1980s Korea with no education. It reflects the hopelessness of the poor, as well as the outsider. This is shown by Chilsu's dream of migrating to Miami as an escape from his world and a solution to his life, though he has never been there. Mansu fails to secure stable work due to his father's history of being a communist.

Another theme is cultural imperialism by the West in Korea. Jina, whom Chilsu loves, works at Burger King; Mansu dresses up as a painter from France to impress women; Chilsu wears a shirt resembling the American flag and the billboard that the two men paint is an ad for American whiskey.

Chilsu falls in love with Jina, appearing upbeat and excited about the changes going around him. Korea has begun to democratize, and he is in love with Jina. He is so elated that he quits his job painting movie billboards to work with Mansu, telling his old boss that he has freedom of choice.

Despite this, things are not what they seem. First, the film begins with a civil defense drill, which is used by the government to condition citizens to deal with a North Korean attack and as a form of control to keep the populace on edge. Second, a newscast makes a vague reference to the working-class tale A Dwarf Launches a Little Ball in reporting about a man climbing down an apartment chimney to look for his wife. Finally, the biggest giveaway is that the characters are constantly in need of money while others reap the benefits of economic and political changes at this time.

Later in the film, both men are found to be downtrodden and have minjung (working class) connections. The optimistic Chilsu is from an area dependent on American soldiers for income. His worst problems stem from his sister being disowned for selling herself to American soldiers and his father leeching off his new wife. Chilsu's sister has not spoken to his family, and his dreams of emigrating and marrying Jina are a delusion. On the other hand, Mansu's problems stem from his father's affiliation with communists, which denies him an education and decent employment and is the root of his extreme pessimism.

Their frustrations reach a climax when both characters confide their secrets to each other. They climb to their just-completed billboard and vent their frustration at "rich bastards" in downtown Seoul, which culminates in a tense standoff with authorities. Chilsu and Mansu's anger symbolizes the working class's frustration of being marginalized from the nation's economic miracle, and the standoff near the end represents society's inability to understand their plight. As a whole, the film engages with its message of hope and the need to fight for change.

== Cast ==
- Park Joong-hoon as Chilsu, a smooth-talking billboard painter who struggles to hold down a job; and his evolving friendship with Man-su
- Ahn Sung-ki as Mansu, a capable and intelligent worker who is held back in life because his father is an "unreformed" Communist sympathizer, serving a long sentence in a South Korean prison.
- Bae Jong-ok as Jina, a college student and part-time Burger King worker whom Chilsu falls in love with.
- Kim Myeong-kuk
- Kwon Jae-hee

== Release ==
In a special program in collaboration with the Korean Film Archive to revisit Ahn Sung-ki's life, the 31st Busan International Film Festival will present the film during its run in October 2026.

== Reception and importance ==
At the 42nd Locarno International Film Festival, it was the winner of the second runner-up prize for the Young Critics' Award. It was also presented during the 39th Berlin International Film Festival as well as the third Singapore International Film Festival.

To contemporary audiences, the film 'Chilsu and Mansu' might appear to carry a relatively mild political message; however, when viewed within the context of Korean cinema and society in the 1980s, it represented a bold attempt to bridge mainstream cinema with political filmmaking. Although it was not particularly successful at the box office, the film ‘Chilsu and Mansu’ became one of the most memorable Korean movies of its time by reflecting the frustrations of a generation growing up amidst social inequality and authoritarian rule.

== Bibliography ==
- "칠수와 만수" [Chilsu and Mansu]. Cine21 (in Korean). Archived from the original on 3 November 2006.
- Kim, Kyung-hyun (2004). "5. New Korean Cinema Auteurs: Male Crisis in the Early Films of Park Kwang-su: Chilsu and Mansu". The Remasculinization of Korean Cinema. Durham and London: Duke University Press. pp. 143–151. ISBN 0-8223-3267-1.
