= An Chi-hwan =

South Korean singer-songwriter

- 안치환
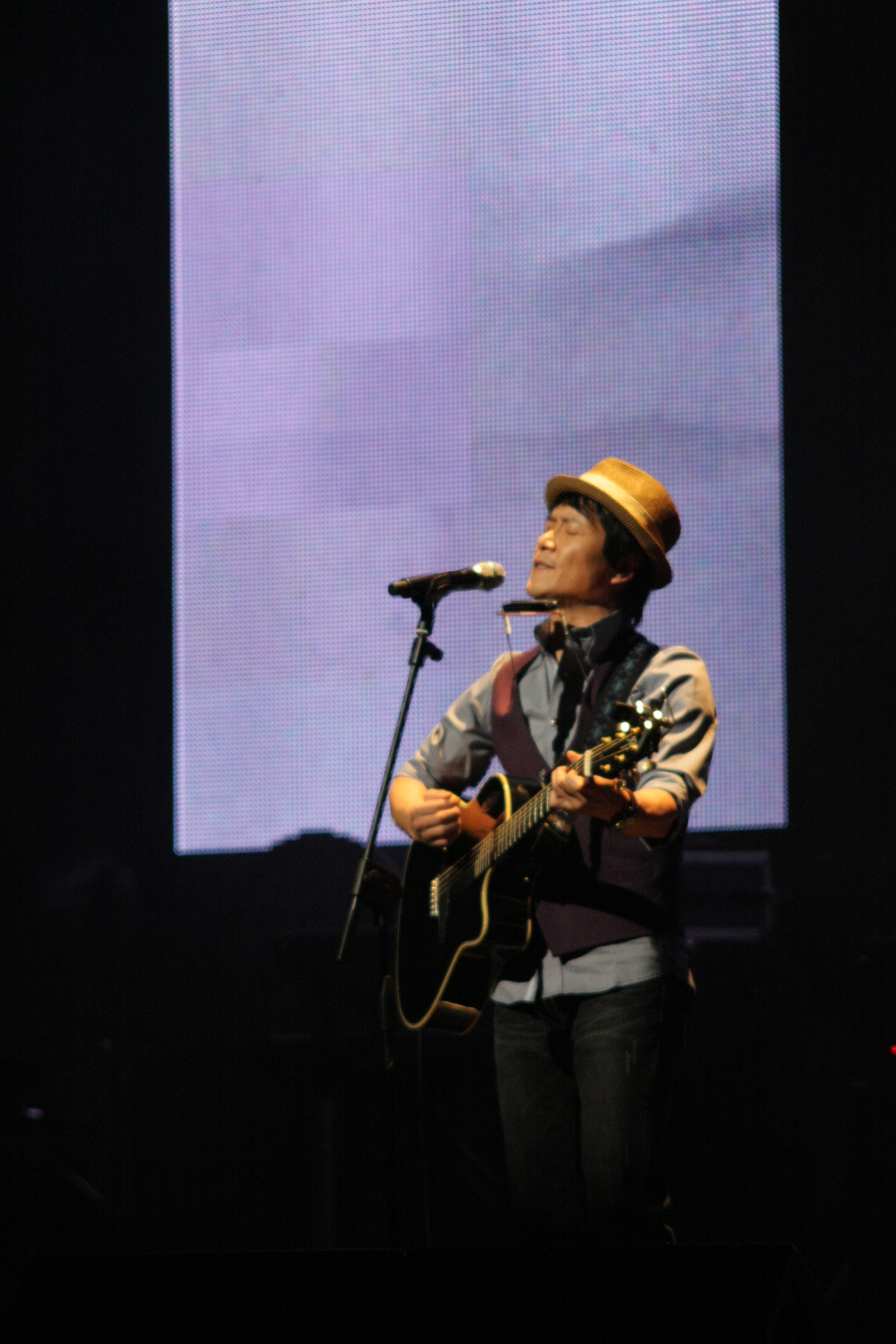
- An performing at Sejong Centre in December 2010
- Born: 16 November 1965 (age 60); Hwaseong, Gyeonggi, South Korea
- Education: Yonsei University
- Occupations: Singer; songwriter; record producer
- Spouse: Kim Mi-ok (m. 1998)
- Children: 2
- Musical career
- Genres: Pop; rock; ballad; folk
- Years active: 1984–present
- Formerly of: Nochatsa (1988–1989)
- Website: anchihwan.com

An Chi-hwan (Korean: 안치환, born 16 November 1965) is a South Korean singer, song-writer, and record producer. A former member of Nochatsa, he is one of the notable 386 singer.

== Biography ==
Born in Hwaseong, An received a Bachelor in Social Work from Yonsei University. In 1984, the year when he registered to Yonsei University, he joined Ullimtu, the school's central band. He also joined another band, Dawn, in 1986.

An joined Nochatsa (Song Finders) in 1988, and cooperated to release its 2nd studio album, Song Finders 2 in the following year. He recorded 2 songs — "At The Vast Field (광야에서)" and "Dried Leaves Revive (마른잎 다시 살아나)", and subsequently left the band. He then, however, unsuccessfully released the 1st studio album An Chi-hwan in 1990 and 2nd Song Festival in 1991; he later mentioned that he had a trouble with his label, and both were re-created as An Chi-hwan 1+2 in 1994, shortly after his 3rd album Confession.

An married to Kim Mi-ok in May 1998, and has a son and a daughter.

In 2014, An was diagnosed with rectal cancer. The next year, he released a new album 50 that consists of songs related to his health status. His most recent album is 53 released in 2018.

== Discography ==
=== Nochatsa ===
- Song Finders 2 (1989)

=== Studio album ===
- An Chi-hwan (1990)
- Song Festival (1991)
- Confession (1993)
- An Chi-hwan 1+2 (1994)
- If I Were (1995)
- Nostalgia (1997)
- Desire (1997)
- I Still Believe (1999)
- Remember (2000)
- Good Luck (2001)
- Clamour (2004)
- Beyond Nostalgia (2006)
- An Chi-hwan 9 (2007)
- Song for Jeong Ho-seung (2008)
- Today Is Good (2010)
- 50 (2015)
- 53 (2018)

=== Compilation album ===
- An Chi-hwan Song Festival (1994)
- An Chi-hwan Collections (2014)
- An Chi-hwan Anthology (2014)

=== Single album ===
- Single 2012 (2012)
- Two Views Looking Power (2016)
- April Camellia (2018)
- Shouts of 100 Years (2019)

=== Live album ===
- Live '01 ~ '02 (2002)
- Sing Alone (2012)
