= Hwang In-sung =

South Korean politician (1926–2010)

The Right Honourable Hwang In-sung
- 황인성
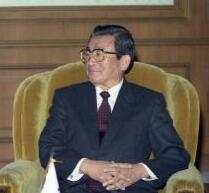
- March 1993

25th Prime Minister of South Korea
- In office 25 February 1993 – 16 December 1993
- President: Kim Young-sam
- Preceded by: Hyun Soong-jong
- Succeeded by: Lee Hoi-chang

Personal details
- Born: 9 January 1926 Muju, Zenrahoku-dō, Korea, Empire of Japan
- Died: 11 October 2010 (aged 84) Seoul, South Korea
- Education: Korea Military Academy

Korean name
- Hangul: 황인성
- Hanja: 黃寅性
- RR: Hwang Inseong
- MR: Hwang Insŏng

Hwang In-sung (황인성; 9 January 1926 – 11 October 2010) was a South Korean soldier and politician who served as the prime minister of South Korea from February to December 1993 under President Kim Young-sam.

Born in the 4th Military Academy, he was appointed as a Major General in 1968. After the 16 May military affairs, he worked as a politician. Later, he joined the Democratic Party, serving as a member of the 11th, 12th and 14th National Assembly and as the first Prime Minister of the Civilian Government in 1993. He then resigned as prime minister for 10 months due to an open rice ripple. In 1996, he served as a standing advisor to the Kumho Asiana Group. He served as a chairman of the Ahn Jung-geun association from 2002 until his death.

He died of old age on 11 October 2010, at the age of 84.
