= Let Me Out (film) =

- Hangul: 렛미아웃
- RR: Renmiaut
- MR: Renmiaut
- Directed by: Kim Chang-rae; Jae Soh
- Written by: Kim Chang-rae; Jae Soh
- Produced by: Jae Soh; Irene Cho; Min Soh
- Starring: Kwon Hyun-sang; Park Hee-von
- Cinematography: Kim Seung-hoon
- Distributed by: Baekdu-Daegan Film Company
- Release date: August 15, 2013
- Running time: 97 minutes
- Country: South Korea
- Language: Korean
- Budget: ₩150 million

Let Me Out (Korean: 렛 미 아웃) is a 2013 South Korean film. Part coming-of-age, part comedy, the low-budget indie is about a film student's struggles with making a movie for the first time, and captures the harsh realities of the Korean filmmaking industry. Produced by the Seoul Institute of the Arts and the Baekdu-Daegan Film Company, it was directed by Soh Jae-young (or Jae Soh) and Kim Chang-rae, and starred Kwon Hyun-sang in his first leading role.

Let Me Out won the Gold Medal Award at the 57th New York Festivals International Television & Film Awards in 2014.

== Plot ==
Mu-young (Kwon Hyun-sang) is a 4th-year film student and convenience store clerk. A know-it-all who is quick to pick apart and ridicule the work of others, he is endlessly complaining about the state of the Korean film industry and showing off his vast knowledge of cinema. When a famous indie director (Yang Ik-june) visits his university, his fellow students are starstruck, but Mu-young is unimpressed. At a Q&A session, he mocks the director's most recent work as a commercial sellout. Similarly unimpressed with Mu-young's attitude, the director throws it back at him, unexpectedly "awarding" him a US$5,000 production grant and challenging him to go out and actually shoot a decent film.

The problem is, Mu-young is nowhere close to being prepared, with his unfinished screenplay languishing in a drawer. With no other choice, he gathers together a cast and crew with varying experience, and casts Ah-young (Park Hee-von), the girl he loves, as the protagonist. He sets out to shoot his dream project, a zombie melodrama. But his inexperience, demands and impatience cause everyone around him to go crazy, turning his project into a nightmare. Everything that can go wrong, does, and the shoot faces a series of obstacles and accidents, from casting actors to securing locations and funds. Mu-young comes to realize that the reality of filmmaking is very different from theory, and like love, isn't easy at all.

== Cast ==
- Kwon Hyun-sang as Mu-young
- Park Hee-von as Ah-young
- Han Geun-sup as Yong-woon
- Yu Mou-young as professor
- Yang Ik-june (cameo)
- Lee Myung-se (cameo)

== Release ==
Let Me Out premiered at the 2012 Puchon International Fantastic Film Festival. Then in 2013, it was the first Korean independent film to receive a simultaneous theater release in South Korea and the United States.

Baekdu-Daegan Film Company released the film in Korea on August 15, 2013, in approximately 15 theaters, including Art House Momo, CGV Movie Collage, and Artplus Cinema Network. It made its U.S. premiere at The Downtown Independent in Los Angeles on August 16, and was released by distributor Funimation on September 25 in San Francisco, San Diego and Dallas, on October 23 in Atlanta, and on October 24 in Chicago.
