= Hyun Soong-jong =

South Korean politician (1919–2020)

His Excellency Hyun Soong-jong
- 현승종

24th Prime Minister of South Korea
- In office 8 October 1992 – 24 February 1993
- President: Roh Tae-woo
- Preceded by: Chung Won-shik
- Succeeded by: Hwang In-sung

Personal details
- Born: 26 February 1919 Kaechon, Korea, Empire of Japan
- Died: 25 May 2020 (aged 101) South Korea
- Education: See: Keijō Imperial University; Tulane University; Korea University

Korean name
- Hangul: 현승종
- Hanja: 玄勝鍾
- RR: Hyeon Seungjong
- MR: Hyŏn Sŭngjong

Hyun Soong-jong (26 February 1919 – 25 May 2020) was a South Korean politician who served as the prime minister of South Korea from 8 October 1992 to 25 February 1993. Hyun died on 25 May 2020, at the age of 101.

== Awards ==
=== National ===
See

- 1992 Chungmu Order of Military Merit
- 1992 National Merit Dongbaek Medal

Political offices
Preceded by Chung Won-shik	Prime Minister of South Korea; 1992–1993	Succeeded by Hwang In-sung
