= Chung Won-shik =

Prime Minister of South Korea from 1991 to 1992

His Excellency Chung Won-shik
- 정원식
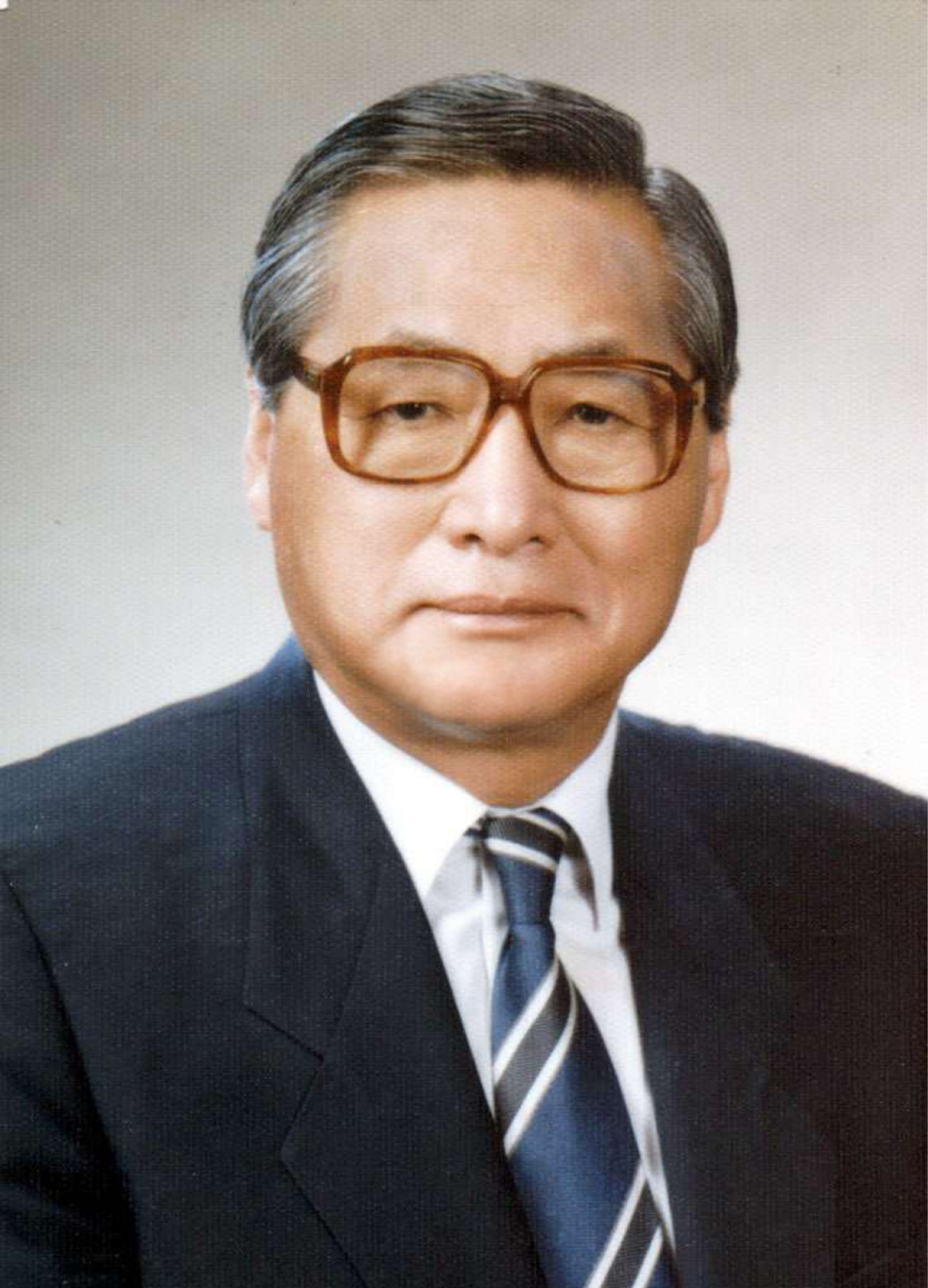

23rd Prime Minister of South Korea
- In office 24 May 1991 – 7 July 1991 (acting)
- President: Roh Tae-woo
- Preceded by: Ro Jai-bong
- Succeeded by: (Himself)
- In office 8 July 1991 – 7 October 1992
- President: Roh Tae-woo
- Preceded by: (Himself)
- Succeeded by: Hyun Soong-jong

Personal details
- Born: 5 August 1928 Sainei, Kōkai-dō, Korea, Empire of Japan
- Died: 12 April 2020 (aged 91) South Korea
- Education: Seoul National University (BA); Vanderbilt University (MA, PhD)

Korean name
- Hangul: 정원식
- Hanja: 鄭元植
- RR: Jeong Wonsik
- MR: Chŏng Wŏnsik

Chung Won-shik (Korean: 정원식; 5 August 1928 – 12 April 2020) was a South Korean politician, educator, soldier, and author who served as the prime minister of South Korea from 1991 to 1992 under President Roh Tae-woo.

== Life ==
From 1951 to 1955, Chung served as an officer in the South Korean Army. Following that, he worked as a professor of Seoul National University. During his tenure as education minister, he established a reputation for toughness. President Roh Tae-woo named him Acting Prime Minister on 24 May 1991. On 8 July 1991, he was appointed Prime Minister of South Korea. He was one of three candidates for the mayor of Seoul in 1995. Chung died from kidney disease on 12 April 2020, aged 91.

== Election results ==
=== Local elections ===
==== Mayor of Seoul ====
Year	Elections	Constituency	Political party	Votes (%)	Remarks
1995	1st Iocal Election	Seoul (Mayoral Elections)	DLP	1,001,446 (20.67%)	Defeated (3rd)

== See also ==
- Lee Hoi-chang
- Goh Kun
- Cho Soon
- Choi Byung-ryeol
- Chang Myon

Political offices
Preceded by Ro Jai-bong	Prime Minister of South Korea (Acting); 1991	Succeeded by Chung Won-sik
Preceded by Chung Won-sik (Acting)	Prime Minister of South Korea; 1991–1992	Succeeded by Hyun Soong-jong
Preceded by Kim Young-sik	Education Minister of South Korea; 1988–1990	Succeeded by Yun Hyung-seob
