= Ro Jai-bong =

South Korean politician (1936–2024)

His Excellency Ro Jai-bong
- 노재봉

22nd Prime Minister of South Korea
- In office 27 December 1990 – 22 January 1991 (acting)
- President: Roh Tae-woo
- Preceded by: Kang Young-hoon
- Succeeded by: (Himself)
- In office 23 January 1991 – 23 May 1991
- President: Roh Tae-woo
- Preceded by: (Himself)
- Succeeded by: Chung Won-shik

Personal details
- Born: 8 February 1936 Changwon, Korea, Empire of Japan
- Died: 23 April 2024 (aged 88) Seoul, South Korea
- Party: Independent
- Education: Seoul National University (BA); Brigham Young University (MA); New York University (PhD)

Ro Jai-bong (8 February 1936 – 23 April 2024) was a South Korean politician who served as the prime minister of South Korea from December 1990 to May 1991.

== Biography ==
Ro was born in Changwon, Korea, Empire of Japan on February 8, 1936.

Ro graduated from Seoul National University and received a doctorate in political science from New York University. He then worked as an international political scientist before joining government as chief of staff for President Roh Tae-woo in 1990 and became prime minister shortly afterwards. In 1992, he was elected to the National Assembly of Korea.

After his political career, Ro became president of Seoul Digital University from 2002 to 2005.

Ro was married and had two children. He was diagnosed with blood cancer in 2023 and died from complications of the disease at Seoul St. Mary's Hospital on April 23, 2024, at the age of 88.
