= Im Kwon-taek =

South Korean film director (born 1934)

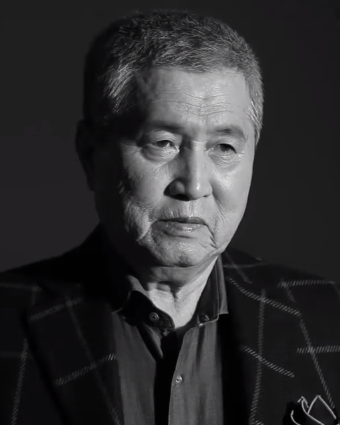
- Im in 2013
- Born: December 8, 1934 (age 91); Jangseong County, Zenranan Prefecture, Korea, Empire of Japan
- Education: Chonnam National University (Hon. Ph.D. in Literature, 2011)
- Years active: 1962–present
- Spouse: Chae Ryeong (m. 1979)
- Children: 2, including Kwon Hyun-sang
- Honours: Legion of Honour - Knight (2007)

Korean name
- Hangul: 임권택
- Hanja: 林權澤
- RR: Im Gwontaek
- MR: Im Kwŏnt'aek

Im Kwon-taek (Korean: 임권택; born December 8, 1934) is one of South Korea's most renowned film directors. In an active and prolific career, his films have won many domestic and international film festival awards, as well as considerable box-office success, and helped bring international attention to the Korean film industry. As of spring 2015, he has directed 102 films.

== Early life ==
Im Kwon-taek was born in Jangseong, Zenranan Prefecture, Korea, Empire of Japan, and grew up in Gwangju. After the Korean War, he moved to Busan in search of work. He then moved to Seoul in 1956, where Jeong Chang-hwa, director of Five Fingers of Death (1972), offered him room and board for work as a production assistant. Jeong recommended him for directing in 1961.

== Career ==
Im's directorial premiere was with the 1962 film, Farewell to the Duman River (Dumanganga jal itgeola).

Before 1980, he was known primarily as a commercial filmmaker who could efficiently direct as many as eight genre pictures a year, helping to fulfill the quota for domestic pictures set by the government . His desire to make more artistically satisfying films began to show itself with his 1978 film Jokbo (Genealogy or The Family Tree), but the turning point of his career came with the 1981 film Mandala. From this point his films have been regarded as art-house cinema, and have been regularly shown at international film festivals, and have won numerous awards.

Im has continued to explore themes from Korea's past while also focusing on the Korean cultural identity in modern times. Among Im's most notable recent films are Sopyonje (1993) and Chunhyang (2000), both of which concentrate on the traditional Korean musical art of pansori. The latter film was also based on a traditional Korean legend. Apart from being a critical success, Sopyonje was also a success at the box office, becoming the first domestic film to draw over a million viewers in Seoul alone. Chihwaseon (2002) was also a critical success, earning him Korea's first Best Director award at the Cannes Film Festival. Im Kwon-taek was awarded an Honorary Golden Bear award at the Berlin Film Festival in 2005.

Im Kwon-taek's status, brought on by the critical success of his films, overlapped with a period of the film movement called "New Korean Cinema" or "Korean New Wave". Along with other directors, such as Park Gwang-su and Jang Sun-woo, Im is recognized as one of the founding figures of the movement, which gained international critical recognition and acclaim for Korean Cinema.

In April 2007, Im released his 100th film Beyond the Years, an informal sequel to Sopyonje. In November 2007 the French government announced that it would make Im a knight of the French Legion of Honor.

In 2013, a museum dedicated to Im opened in Busan, on the Dongseo University Centum City Campus.

A documentary on Im, Cloud, Encore (2018) by well-known film critic-turned-director Jung Sung-il, made its world premiere at the 23rd Busan International Film Festival in 2018.

== Personal life ==
He married the actress (Chae Ryeong), who appeared in several of his films. Their two sons Im Dong-joon and Im Dong-jae (a.k.a. Kwon Hyun-sang) are also active in the film industry.

== Filmography ==
Filmography of Im Kwon-taek
Year	Hangul Title	Hanja Title	Romanized Title	English Title	Alternate English Title
Films in the 1960s
1962	두만강아 잘 있거라		Dumanganga jal itgeola	Farewell to the Duman River	
1962	전쟁과 노인		Jeonjaenggwa noin	Old Man in the Combat Zone	The War and an Old Man
1963	남자는 안팔려		Namjaneun anpallyeo	Actors Disguised as Women	
1963	망부석		Mangbuseog	A Wife Turned to Stone	
1963	신문고		Shinmungo	The Throne Memorial Drum	
1963	욕망의 결산		Yogmangui gyeolsan	The End of Desire	
1964	십자매 선생		Shibjamae seonsaeng	Father of Ten Daughters	
1964	단장록		Danjang lok	The Prince's Revolt	
1964	단골 지각생		Dangol jikaksaeng	The Latecomer	
1964	십년세도		Shibnyeon sedo	The Ten-Year Rule	
1964	영화 마마		Yeonghwa mama	Queen Yongwha's Avenger	
1965	빗 속에 지다		Bitsoke jida	Death of an Informer	
1965	왕과 상노		Wanggwa sangno	A Bogus Nobleman	
1966	전쟁과 여교사		Jeonjaenggwa yeogyosa	Schoolmistress on the Battlefield	
1966	법창을 울린 옥이		Beobchangeul ullin oki	Miss Ok and the Divided Court	
1966	나는 왕이다		Naneum wang-ida	I Am a King	
1966	닐니리		Nilniri	A Triangle in Noble Families	
1966	청사초롱		Cheongsa choryong	The Feudal Tenant	
1967	풍운의 검객		Pungunui geomgaek	Swordsmen	
1967	망향천리		Manghyang cheonri	A Wife Retrieved	
1968	요화 장희빈	妖花 張禧嬪	Yohwa Jang Huibin	Femme Fatale, Jang Hee-bin	
1968	바람 같은 사나이		Baramgateun sanai	A Man Called the Wind	
1968	몽녀	夢女	Mongnyeo	The Waking Woman	
1968	돌아온 왼손잡이		Dolaon winsonjabi	Return from the Sea	Return of the Left-Handed Man
1968			Sanai samdae	Three Generations of Men	
1969	비나리는 고모령		Binaerineun gomoryeong	Best Friends and Their Wives	Rain on Gomo Bridge
1969	상해 탈출		Shanghai talchul	Escape from Shanghai	
1969	십오야		Shiboya	Night of the Full Moon	
1969	뇌검		Roegeom	Thunder Sword	
1969	황야의 독수리		Hwangyaui doksori	Eagle of the Plains	
1969	신세 좀 지자구요		Shinse jom jijaguyo	Would You Help Me?	
Films in the 1970s
1970	월하의 검		Wolhaui geom	Swords Under the Moon	
1970	애꾸눈 박		Aeggunun Park	One-Eyed Mr. Park	
1970	이슬 맞은 백일홍		Iseulmajeun baekilhong	Unmarried Mother	
1970	비나리는 선창가		Binaerineun seonchangga	A Vagabond's Story	
1970	그여자를 쫓아라		Geu yeojareul jjochara	A Woman Pursued	
1970	밤차로 온 사나이		Bamcharo on sanai	Man on the Night Train	
1970	비검		Bigeom	The Flying Sword	
1970	속눈썹이 긴 여자		Soknunseobi kin yeoja	A Snapshot and a Murder	
1971	원한의 거리에 눈이 내린다		Wonhanui geori nuni naerinda	Snowing on Grudge Street	
1971	30년만의 대결		30 nyeonmanui daegyeol	The 30-Year Showdown	
1971	원한의 두 꼽추		Weonhan ui tu kkobchu	Revenge of Two Sons	
1971	나를 더 이상 괴롭히지 마라		Nareul deoisang goerobhiji mara	In Search of the Secret Agent	Don't Torture Me Anymore
1971	요검		Yogeom	Swordswoman	
1971	둘째 어머니		Duljjae eomeoni	A Stepmother's Heartache	
1972	명동 삼국지		Myeongdong samgukji	Gangsters of Myeongdong	Whirl of Betrayals on Myeongdong
1972	명동 잔혹사		Myeongdong janhoksa	Cruelty on the Streets of Myeongdong	
1972	돌아온 자와 떠나야 할 자		Dolaon jawa ddeonaya hal ja	Arrivals and Departures	One Returns and the Other Leaves
1972	삼국대협	三國大俠	Samguk daehyeob	Seize the Precious Sword	
1973			Janganmyeonggi obaekwa	Five Hostesses for the Resistance	
1973	대추격		Daechugyeok	Pursuit of the Bandits	The Big Chase
1973	잡초		Jabcho	The Deserted Widow	Weeds
1973	증언	證言	Jeungeon	The Testimony	
1974	아내들의 행진	아내들의 行進	Anaedeului haengjin	Wives on Parade	
1974	울지 않으리		Ulji aneuri	I'll Never Cry Again	
1974	연화		Yeonhwa	The Hidden Princess	
1974	연화 2		Yeonhwa 2	The Hidden Princess, Part 2	
1974	왜 그랬던가		Wae guraetdeonga	Who and Why?	
1975	어제 오늘 그리고 내일		Eoje, oneul, geurigo naeil	Yesterday, Today and Tomorrow	
1976	왕십리		Wangshibri	A Byegone Romance	Wang Sib Ri, My Hometown
1976	맨발의 눈길		Maenbalui nunkil	Overcome by Misfortunes	Barefoot In The Snow
1976	낙동강은 흐르는가	洛東江은 흐르는가	Nakdongkaneun heureuneunga	Commando on the Nakdong River	
1976	아내		Anae	Wife	The Industrious Wife
1977	옥례기		Okryegi	The Virtuous Woman	The Life of Okrye
1977	임진왜란과 계월향	壬辰倭亂과 桂月香	Imjinrangwa gyewolhyang	Madame Kye in the Imjin War	
1978	상록수	常綠樹	Sangroksu	The Evergreen Tree	
1978	가깝고도 먼 길		Gaggabgodo meon kil	Near Yet Far Away	
1979	내일 또 내일		Naeil ddo naeil	Again Tomorrow	
1979	족보	族譜	Jokbo	The Genealogy	The Family Pedigree
1979	저 파도 위에 엄마 얼굴이		Jeo padowie eoma eolguli	The Little Adventurer	
1979	깃발없는 기수	깃발없는 旗手	Gitbaleobtneun gisu	The Hidden Hero	No Glory
1979	신궁	神弓	Shingung	The Divine Bow	
Films in the 1980s
1980	복부인		Bokbuin	The Wealthy Woman	Mrs. Speculator
1980	짝코		Jagko	Pursuit of Death	
1981	만다라		Mandala	Mandala	
1982	아벤고 공수 군단		Abenko gongsu gundan	Abenko Green Berets	
1982	우상의 눈물		Woosangui nunmul	High School Tears	Tears of the Idol
1982	오염된 자식들		Oyeomdoen jashikdeul	The Polluted One	
1982	안개 마을		Angae maeul	Village in the Mist	
1982	나비 품에서 울었다		Nabipumeseo uleotda	In the Bosom of a Butterfly	
1983	불의 딸		Bului dal	Daughter of the Flames	
1984	흐르는 강물을 어찌 막으랴		Heureuneun gangmuleul eojji makeorya	The Eternal Flow	You Can't Stop a River
1985	길소뜸		Gilsoddeum	Gilsoddeum	
1986	티켓		Ticket	Ticket	
1986	씨받이		Sibaji	The Surrogate Woman	
1987	아다다		Adada	Adada	
1987	연산일기		Yeonsan ilgi	Diary of King Yeonsan	
1989	아제 아제 바라 아제		Aje aje bara aje	Come Come Come Upward	
1989	손에 손 잡고			Hand in Hand	
Films in the 1990s
1990	장군의 아들	將軍의 아들	Janggunui adeul	General's Son	
1991	장군의 아들 2	將軍의 아들 2	Janggunui adeul II	The General's Son II	
1991	개벽	開闢	Gaebyeok	Fly High Run Far	
1992	장군의 아들 3	將軍의 아들 3	Janggunui adeul III	The General's Son III	
1993	서편제	西便制	Seopyeonje	Seopyeonje	
1994	태백산맥	太白山脈	Taebaek sanmaek	The Taebaek Mountains (film)	
1996	축제	祝祭	Chukje	Festival	
1997	창	娼	Chang	Downfall	Chang
Films since 2000
2000	춘향뎐	春香傳	Chunhyang	Chunhyang	
2002	취화선	醉畵仙	Chihwaseon	Painted Fire	
2004	하류인생	下流人生	Haryu insaeng	Low Life	
2007	천년학	千年鶴	Cheonnyeonhak	Beyond the Years	
2011	달빛 길어올리기		Dalbit Gireoolligi	Hanji	
2014	화장		Hwajang	Revivre	

== Accolades ==
- Asian Film Awards:
  - Lifetime Achievement Award
- Asia Pacific Film Festival
  - Special Jury Award Chunhyang (2000)
  - Best Director and Best Film Sibaji (1987)
- Beautiful Artist Awards (Shin Young-kyun Arts and Culture Foundation)
  - Meritorious Artist Award (2023)
- Berlin International Film Festival
  - Golden Bear: Gilsoddeum (nominated) (1986)
  - Golden Bear: The Taebaek Mountains (nominated) (1995)
  - Honorary Golden Bear (2005)
- Busan International Film Festival
  - Netpac Award Chunhyang (2000)
  - The Asian Filmmaker of the Year (2021)
- Cannes Film Festival
  - Best Director Chihwaseon (2002)
- Grand Bell Awards (Korea), Best Director
  - Testimony (Jungon) (1974)
  - Jokbo (Genealogy/Family Tree) (1979)
  - Mandala (1981)
  - Ticket (1986)
  - Yeonsan ilgi (Diary of King Yonsan) (1988)
- Hankuk Play and Film Arts Awards (Korea), Best Director
  - Wangshibri (A Byegone Romance) (1976)
  - Nakdongkaneun heureuneunga (Commando on the Nakdong River) (1976)
  - Angae maeul (Village in the Mist) (1983)
- Hawaii International Film Festival
  - Best Feature Film Chunhyang (2000)
- International Film Festival of India
  - Lifetime Achievement Award
- Korean Film Critics Awards, Best Director
  - Gilsoddeum (Gilsodom) (1986)
  - Ticket (1986)
- 16th Moscow International Film Festival
  - Golden St. George: Come Come Come Upward (1989) (nominated)
- San Francisco International Film Festival
  - Akira Kurosawa Award (1998)
- Shanghai International Film Festival
  - Golden Goblet - Best Director Seopyeonje (1993)
- Singapore International Film Festival
  - 2001 Silver Screen Award - Best Asian Director Chunhyang (2000)
  - 2014 Silver Screen Award - Honorary Award
- Telluride Film Festival
  - Silver Medallion Award (2000)

=== State honors ===
Name of country, year given, and name of honor
Country	Award Ceremony	Year	Honor	Ref.
France	Legion d'Honneur - Jacques Chirac Administration	2007	the Chevalier (Knight) order	

== See also ==
- Cinema of Korea
- List of Korean film directors
- Legion of Honour
- List of Legion of Honour recipients by name (I)
- Legion of Honour Museum

== External links and references ==
- Beech, Hannah (3 June 2002). "The Unbearable Sadness of Being Korean". Time. Archived from the original on September 30, 2007.
- Page about the Korean New Wave at asianinfo.org
- Biography and interview at cinekorea.com
- Crow, Jonathan. "Im Kwon-Taek: Biography". Allmovie.
- Im Kwon-taek at IMDb
- Interview: Reflection In A Mirror at asianfilms.org
- James, David E.; Kim Kyung-hyun, eds. (2002). Im Kwon-Taek: The Making of a Korean National Cinema. Detroit: Wayne State University Press. ISBN 0-8143-2869-5.
- Lee, Young-il (1988). The History of Korean Cinema. Motion Picture Promotion Corporation. ISBN 89-88095-12-X., p. 342-343.
- (in Korean) Naver Cast - Im Kwon-taek
- (in Korean) Doosan Encyclopedia - Im Kwon-taek
