= Park Kwang-su =

South Korean filmmaker (born 1955)

- Born: January 22, 1955 (age 71); Sokcho, Gangwon Province
- Education: Seoul National University (bachelor's degree in fine arts)
- Occupations: Film director, screenwriter
- Years active: 1988–present

Korean name
- Hangul: 박광수
- Hanja: 朴光守
- RR: Bak Gwangsu
- MR: Pak Kwangsu

Park Kwang-su (born January 22, 1955) is a South Korean filmmaker. He was born in Sokcho, Gangwon Province and grew up in Busan. Park joined the Yallasung Film Group as a student of Fine Arts at Seoul National University. Upon graduation, he founded and led the Seoul Film Group which was dedicated to renewing Korean film culture and closely tied to the student protest movement. The Seoul Film Group was a significant part of the independent film movement and a strong voice speaking out against the military dictatorship. Park studied film at the ESEC film school in Paris, then returned to Korea to work as an assistant director to Lee Chang-Ho. He made his own first feature in 1988, and in 1993 became the first Korean filmmaker to found his own production company.

Park is considered the leader of the "New Korean Cinema" movement and one of Korea's most distinguished filmmakers. His films have garnered critical acclaim and he has received numerous domestic and international awards for his films.

== Influence: the emergence of the New Korean Wave ==
With the formation of new French and German cultural centers in Seoul, screenings of foreign art films were held, which eventually led to the creation of cinema clubs in which film was discussed and studied. Names such as Park Kwang-su, Chung Ji-young, Kim Hong-joon, and a number of other directors, producers and film critics were exposed to a world of international cinema and eventually branched off in order to create films and documentaries that showed Korean culture and history through the viewpoint of the people, predominantly the working class. Some of these short films and documentaries were produced by the Seoul Film Collective which was launched in 1982 and made up of Seoul National University graduates including Park Kwang-su, Jang Sun-woo and other directors. That Summer (1984), which focused on labourers from rural areas working in Seoul, and Suri-se (1984), which touched upon agricultural issues in southwestern Korea, are just two of the works that the Seoul Film Collective produced.

The New Korean Wave was made possible by two developments: a partial relaxation of censorship and the second change in film policy. Due to the relaxation of censorship, filmmakers such as Park Kwang-Su had more freedom to produce films that were originally prohibited by the government during the early censorship periods. The second film policy made it easier for independent producers like Park to enter the Korean film industry. Rather than trying to fill the "quotas" to produce mediocre Korean films, Park and other independent film producers were able to collaborate on quality films that pushed for social change. Without these policy changes, Park Kwang-Su would not have been able to make such films such as Chilsu and Mansu, which was a catalyst to the wave of New Korean Cinema. "While all of Park's movies are firmly rooted in the political history of his country, he belongs to a group of international filmmakers whose work transcends their specific political situations to address, with great artistry, more universal issues of human freedom."

== Filmography ==
=== Films ===
Feature films credits
| Year | Title | | Credited as | | | | Ref. |
| Year | English | Korean | Director | Screenwriter | Producer | Other | Ref. |
|---|---|---|---|---|---|---|---|
| 1986 | Lee Jang-ho's Baseball Team | 이장호의 외인구단 | Lee Jang-ho | Chi Sang-hak | Lee Jang-ho | Assistant Director | |
| 1988 | Chilsu and Mansu | 칠수와 만수 | Park Kwang-su | Choe In-seok | Lee Woo-suk | | |
| 1990 | Black Republic | 그들도 우리처럼 | Park Kwang-su | Yun Dae-seong; Kim Sung-su; Park Kwang-su | Lee Woo-suk | Editor | |
| 1991 | Berlin Report | 베를린 리포트 | Park Kwang-su | Park Kwang-su | Seo Byeong-gi | | |
| 1993 | To the Starry Island | 그 섬에 가고싶다 | Park Kwang-su | Park Kwang-su | Park Kwang-su | | |
| 1995 | A Single Spark | 아름다운 청년 전태일 | Park Kwang-su | Lee Chang-dong; Kim Jeong-hwan; Yi Hyo-in; Hur Jin-ho; Park Kwang-su | Yoo In-taek | | |
| 1996 | Beautiful Youth Jeon Tae-il | 전태일의 비밀 | Park Kwang-su | Park Kwang-su; Kim Yun-tae | | | |
| 1997 | Wild Animals | 야생동물 보호구역 | Kim Ki-duk | Kim Ki-duk | Kwon Ki-yeong | Executive Producer | |
| 1999 | The Uprising | 이재수의 난 | Park Kwang-su | Park Kwang-su | Yoo In-taek | | |
| 2003 | If You Were Me | 여섯개의 시선 | Lim Soon-rye; Jeong Jae-eun; Yeo Kyun-dong | Lim Soon-rye; Im Yeon-hui; Jeong Jae-eun; Park Jin-pyo; Park Kwang-su; Park Chan-wook | Lee Hyeon-seung | | |
| 2007 | Meet Mr. Daddy | 눈부신 날에 | Park Kwang-su | Park Kwang-su; Park Chae-woon | Jeong Hoon-tak; Oh Ki-min | | |

=== Short films ===
Short films credits
| Year | Title | | Credited as | | Ref. |
| Year | English | Korean | Director | Screenwriter | Ref. |
|---|---|---|---|---|---|
| 1982 | Black Republic | 그들도 우리처럼 | Park Kwang-su | Park Kwang-su | |
| 1982 | Pannori Arirang | 판놀이아리랑 출연진 | Park Kwang-su; Kim Hong-joon; Hwang Gyu-duk; Moon Won-rip | | |
| 1999 | www.whitelover.com | 빤스 벗고 덤벼라 | Park Kwang-su | Park Kwang-su | |
| 2000 | 2000 Digital Short Films by Three Filmmakers 2000 | 디지털 삼인삼색 2000 | Park Kwang-su | Park Kwang-su | |

== See also ==
- Cinema of Korea

== Bibliography ==
- Kim, Kyung-hyun (2004). "5. New Korean Cinema Auteurs: Male Crisis in the Early Films of Park Kwang-su". The Remasculinization of Korean Cinema. Durham and London: Duke University Press. pp. 136–161. ISBN 0-8223-3267-1.
- Pacquet, Darcy (2009). New Korean Cinema: Breaking the Waves. Korea: Wallflower Press. pp. 15–16, 21. ISBN 978-1-906660-25-3.
