= Tae-Hye-Ji =

South Korean cultural term for a trio of actresses

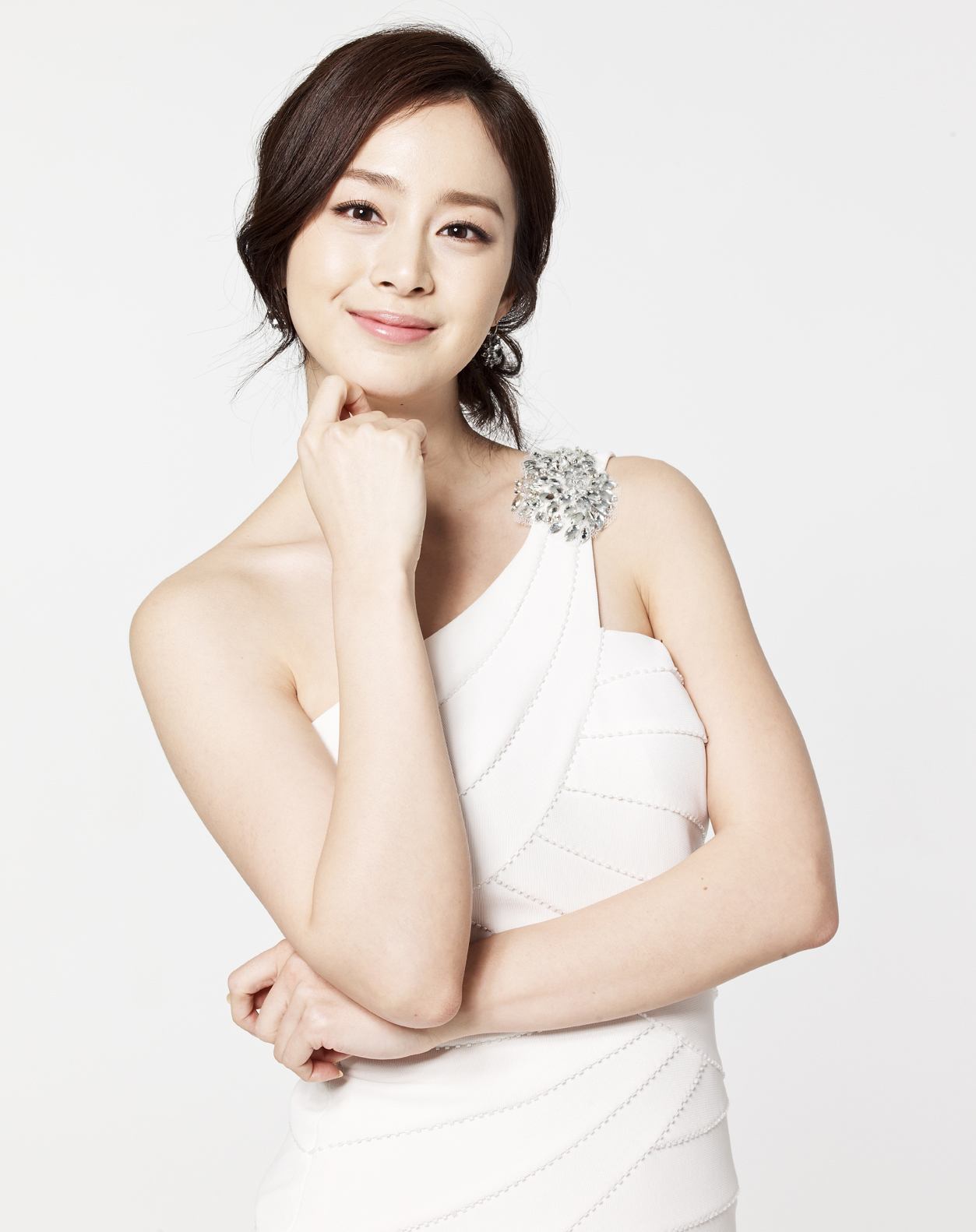
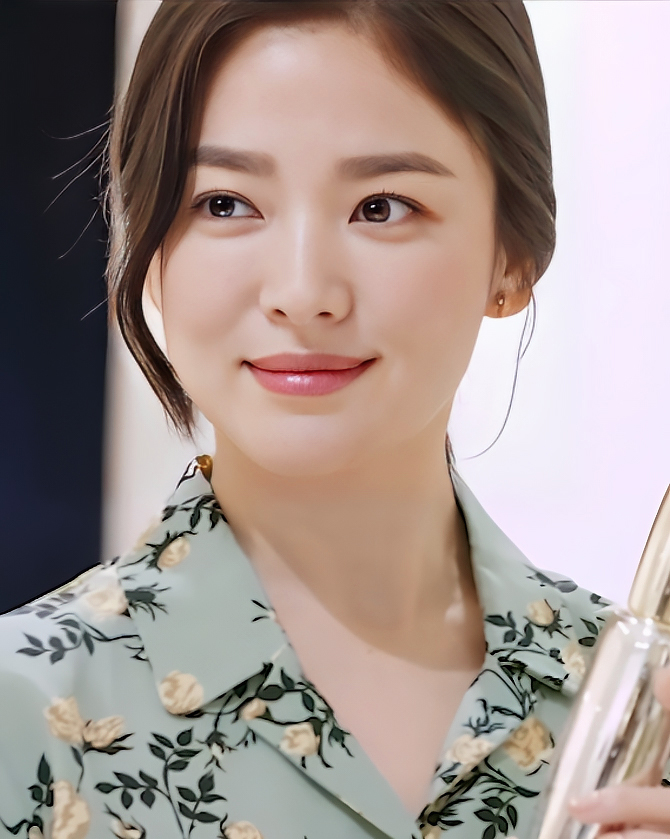
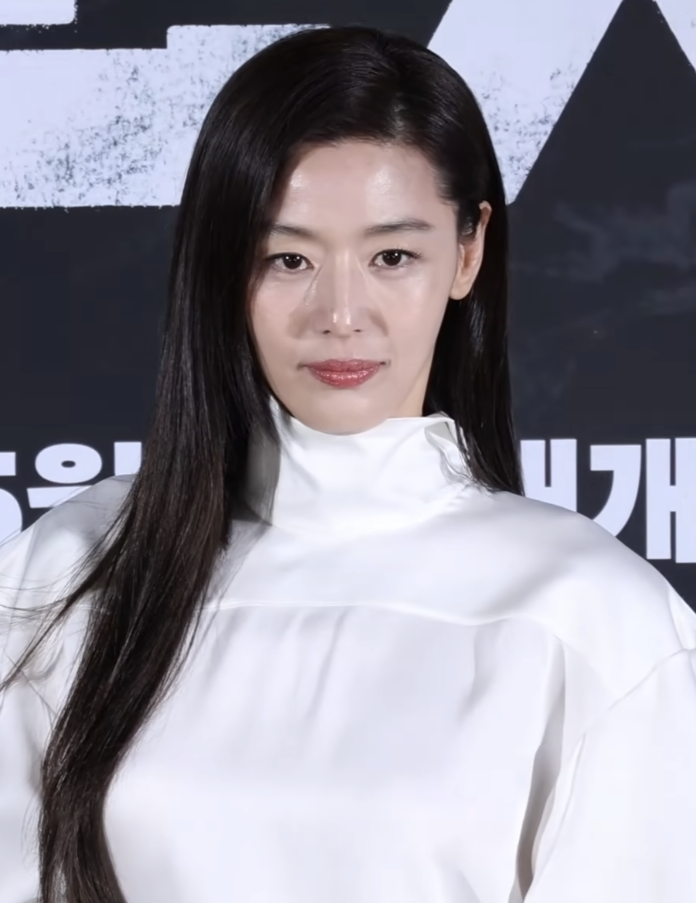
Tae-Hye-Ji Kim Tae-hee Song Hye-kyo Jun Ji-hyun
- Hangul: Korean: 태혜지
- Type: Cultural acronym, Media term
- Members: Kim Tae-hee; Song Hye-kyo; Jun Ji-hyun
- Period: Early 2000s–Present
- Usage: South Korean media, marketing, and cultural analysis

Tae-Hye-Ji (Korean: 태혜지) is a coined term and acronym used in South Korean media and popular culture to refer to three actresses: Kim Tae-hee, Song Hye-kyo, and Jun Ji-hyun. The term emerged in the early 2000s to collectively describe the actresses who were identified by The Korea Herald as the representative icons of the Korean Wave (Hallyu) due to their brand recognition and advertising value.

The term has been widely referenced in Korean media coverage discussing celebrity branding and generational comparisons. Media outlets have drawn parallels between this grouping and the "1970s Troika" Jeong Yun-hui, Chang Mi-hee, and Yu Ji-in), citing Tae-Hye-Ji as a modern continuation of the industry's "troika" tradition.

== Etymology ==
The term is a portmanteau derived from the second syllable of each actress's given name. It was coined by internet users in the early 2000s and subsequently adopted by mainstream media to categorize the top tier of visual actresses.

- Tae from Kim Tae-hee: Gained prominence through dramas such as Stairway to Heaven (2003).
- Hye from Song Hye-kyo: Established international recognition with Autumn in My Heart (2000) and Full House (2004).
- Ji from Jun Ji-hyun: Achieved widespread fame following the film My Sassy Girl (2001).

== Cultural significance ==
=== Media usage ===
Tae-Hye-Ji is used in journalism and broadcasting to describe a collective dominance in the advertising and drama industries. According to the Korea JoongAng Daily, unlike typical idol groups formed by agencies, this grouping was organic and created by the public. Even as the actresses reduced their acting activities, the term persisted as a synonym for "top visual actress."

In 2015, The Korea Herald reported that the trio continued to command the highest endorsement fees in the industry, outperforming younger competitors. International lifestyle publications, such as Tatler Asia, have also noted the trio's influence in spreading the Korean Wave across the region.

=== Comparison to other generations ===
The concept of a "Troika" (a group of three dominant figures) is a recurring theme in Korean entertainment history.

- Predecessors: The media often compares Tae-Hye-Ji to the "1970s Troika" of Jeong Yun-hui, Chang Mi-hee, and Yu Ji-in, who dominated the cinema of that era.
- Successors: Media commentary has described the Tae-Hye-Ji grouping as influential for subsequent generations. Various outlets have proposed new acronyms for younger actresses (such as "Tae-Hye-Ji 2.0"), though few have achieved the same level of widespread recognition.
  In the K-pop sector, the visual trio "Jang-Ka-Sul" (Jang Won-young, Karina, and Sullyoon) has been cited by Star News and SBS Star as a modern idol equivalent, reflecting the public's continued interest in "troika" groupings.
  In the 2020s, South Korean media outlet Chosun Ilbo has referred the "So-Youn-Ye" (Han So-hee, Go Youn-jung, and Shin Ye-eun) as part of the "MZ Troika".
