= Jun Ji-hyun =

South Korean actress (born 1981)

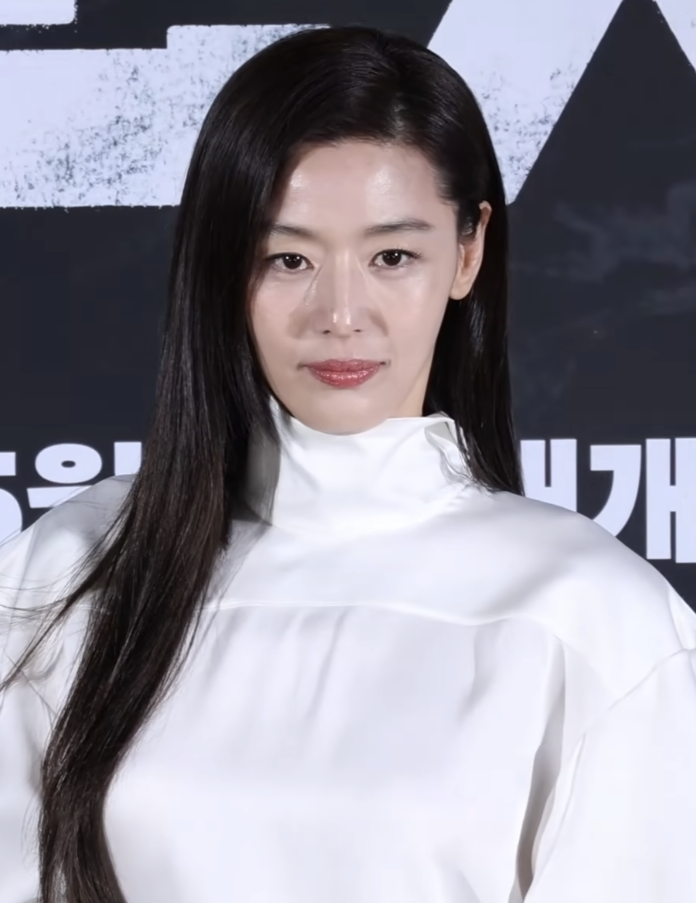
- Jun in 2026
- Born: Wang Ji-hyun; 30 October 1981 (age 45); Seoul, South Korea
- Other name: Gianna Jun
- Education: Dongguk University (BA, MA)
- Occupations: Actress; model
- Years active: 1997–present
- Agent: Peachy
- Height: 173.5 cm (5 ft 8 in)
- Spouse: Choi Joon-hyuk (m. 2012)
- Children: 2

Korean name
- Hangul: 왕지현
- Hanja: 王智賢
- RR: Wang Jihyeon
- MR: Wang Chihyŏn

Stage name
- Hangul: 전지현
- Hanja: 全智賢
- RR: Jeon Jihyeon
- MR: Chŏn Chihyŏn
- Website: peachy.im

Wang Ji-hyun (Korean: 왕지현; born 30 October 1981), known professionally as Jun Ji-hyun (전지현) and Gianna Jun, is a South Korean actress and model. She rose to fame with her role in the romantic comedy film My Sassy Girl (2001), which was popular in several Asian countries. She has also starred in Il Mare (2000), Windstruck (2004), The Thieves (2012), The Berlin File (2013), and Assassination (2015). Jun also found success in television with dramas My Love from the Star (2013–2014) and The Legend of the Blue Sea (2016–2017).

Jun has received multiple accolades, including two Best Actress trophies at the Grand Bell Awards and a Grand Prize at the Baeksang Arts Awards. Her success in film and television has established her as a top hallyu star. She is referred to as one of "The Troika," along with Kim Tae-hee and Song Hye-kyo, collectively known by the acronym "Tae-Hye-Ji".

== Early life and education ==
Jun was born in Gangnam District, Seoul, South Korea. She has a brother who is five years older. Her mother and her mother's friends all encouraged her to be a model or actress due to her height and slim figure. Her childhood dream was to become a flight attendant, but she changed her mind after a flight. In 1997, at the age of 16, she followed her high school female senior and began her career as a model for Ecole Magazine. In 1998, she debuted as an actress and adopted the stage name Jun Ji-hyun, at the suggestion of a producer.

Jun attended college at Dongguk University and graduated in 2004 with a bachelor's degree in Theater and Film. She later enrolled in Dongguk University's graduate school of Digital Media and Contents in 2011 and obtained a master's degree.

== Career ==
=== 1997–2005: Career beginnings and breakthrough ===
Jun first became well known as a commercial model and as a TV actress. Although she made her film debut in the little-watched White Valentine in 1999, it was not until later in the year when she was featured in a commercial for Samsung My Jet Printer that she became a popular sensation. The dancing and attitude expressed in the ad made her into an icon for Koreans in their late teens and early twenties.

The following year, Jun made her first well-publicized film appearance in late 2000 with Il Mare, a handsomely shot melodrama set on Ganghwa Island. The film did respectably well at the box office (despite opening on the same day as blockbuster Joint Security Area) and solidified her status as a star. It was later remade in Hollywood under the title 'Lake House' for the first time in a Korean film starring Sandra Bullock and Keanu Reeves.

Jun's breakout film was comedy My Sassy Girl, a tale of a gullible college student and his slightly unhinged girlfriend. Jun's "sassy, loud, and domineering character while also embodying traits of a pure-hearted girl" ran contrary to gender norms in Asia. The film became the highest grossing Korean comedy of all time in Korea and also spent two weeks at No. 1 in Hong Kong, launching Jun into pan-Asia stardom as one of the biggest hallyu stars in the Chinese-language market. The huge success of My Sassy Girl also solidified Jun's domestic popularity, and she was given the title of the "Nation's First Love". Jun's growing popularity resulted in many companies requesting her endorsement. She also won the Best Actress award at the 2002 Grand Bell Awards.

In 2003, Jun starred in the psychological thriller film The Uninvited, which was rather well received by critics but failed to catch on with viewers. Throughout this time she was a constant presence in TV ads and on billboards in Korea and also in other Asian countries.

She reunited with Kwak Jae-yong, the director of My Sassy Girl, in 2004, appearing as a policewoman in romantic comedy Windstruck. However, viewers felt her role was too similar to My Sassy Girl. There were also signs that her popularity had started to suffer because of overexposure in advertisements. Nonetheless, Windstruck became the best-performing Korean film in Japan at the time, where My Sassy Girl was not as well known. In a 2005 survey of influential movie producers, she was ranked among the top ten most bankable stars in Korea.

Jun's next project Daisy teamed her with Jung Woo-sung (who frequently appeared together with her in Giordano and 2% Lotte Chilsung Water advertisements), and drew attention for its 100% location shooting in the Netherlands, and for using the Hong Kong director Andrew Lau (Infernal Affairs).

=== 2006–2010: Hollywood debut ===
In late 2006, it was announced that Jun would be making her long-predicted jump to Hollywood as the lead role in Blood: The Last Vampire. She went through three months of hard training to play the sword-wielding martial arts heroine. During the filming and promotions for the movie prior to its 2009 release, she adopted the Westernized name Gianna Jun. Jun then launched her own luxury jeans brand in 2008, named Gianna by True Religion, her first celebrity line. She was reportedly involved in every stage of their production, from design to deciding on fit and wash and their decoration with accessories.

For the film A Man Who Was Superman, Jun cut off her signature long silky hair to play a cynical documentary producer who meets an odd, Hawaiian-shirt-clad modern-day hero who battles urban apathy and preaches the virtues of lending a hand. Of initially feeling pressured at the opportunity to work with acclaimed actor Hwang Jung-min, she said, "Although luck was probably involved, I think it's destiny for an actor to 'meet' new work. On the first day I met him, I realized that I have much to learn from him, not only from his acting, but also as an individual."

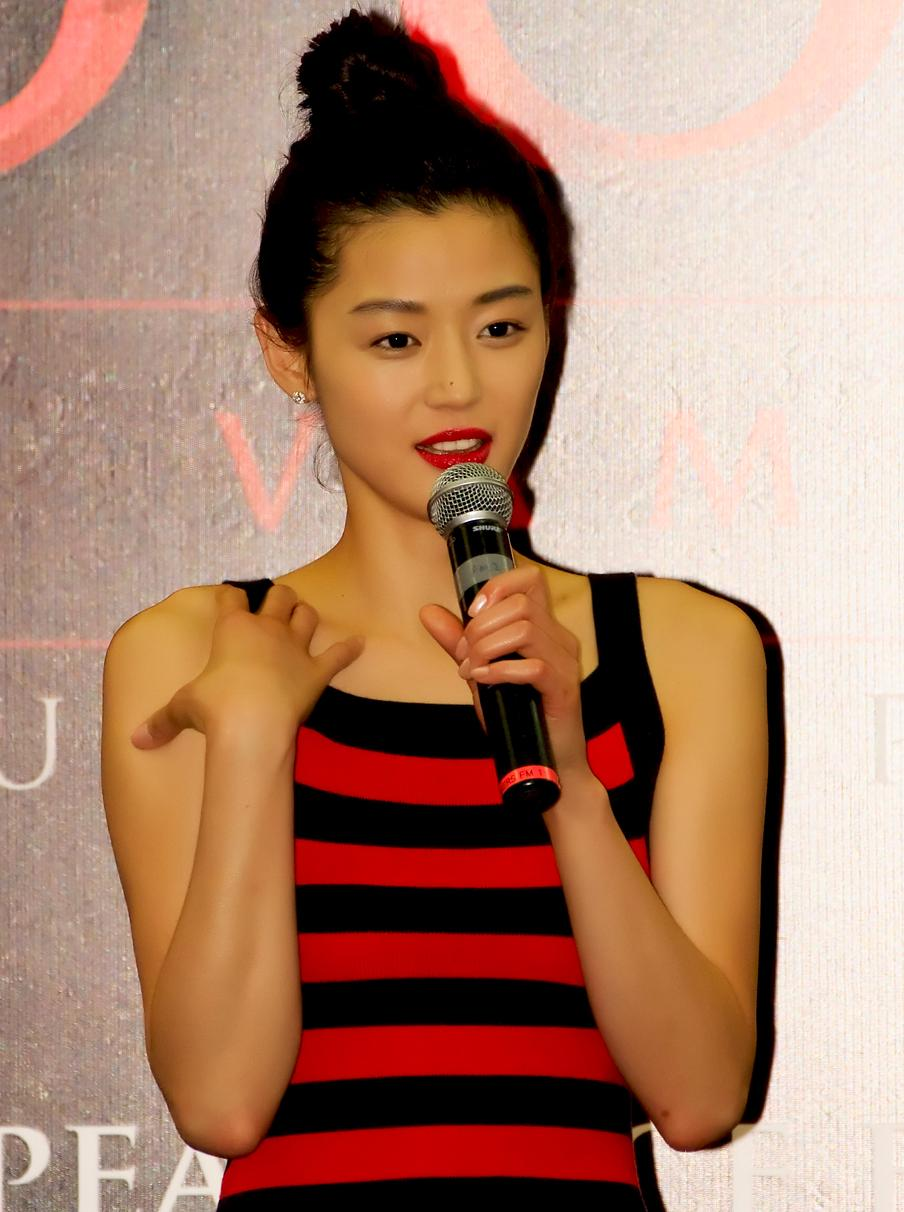
Jun at a promotional event for the film Blood: The Last Vampire in 2009.

In 2010, she acted opposite Chinese actress Li Bingbing in the English-language film Snow Flower and the Secret Fan, based on Lisa See's bestselling novel of the same name, which was directed by Wayne Wang (The Joy Luck Club). The film, set in remote 19th-century China, features the lifelong friendship between two women, Lily and Snow Flower, and their imprisonment imposed by the strict cultural codes of conduct for women at that time. She was photographed by Annie Leibovitz for the July issue of the American edition of Vogue, the first Korean actress to be included in the iconic fashion magazine.

=== 2012–2016: Career resurgence ===
As part of the star-studded cast of The Thieves, Jun was a scene stealer in Choi Dong-hoon's 2012 heist film about thieves from Korea and China who team up together to steal a diamond worth US$30 million, which is locked in a special room at a casino in Macau. The Thieves became the second top-selling Korean film of all time.

She next played a translator married to a North Korean intelligence agent in the 2013 spy thriller The Berlin File, and director Ryoo Seung-wan praised Jun's action scenes and her North Korean dialect. Jun's success on the big screen reaffirmed her status as one of the top actresses in Korea, as well as being one of the biggest box office draw in chungmuro.

14 years after Happy Together in 1999, Jun made her highly anticipated return to television in fantasy romance My Love from the Star, opposite her The Thieves co-star Kim Soo-hyun. Jun plays a present-day top actress who falls in love with an alien who landed on earth 400 years ago during the Joseon period, played by Kim. The series was a ratings success, sparking trends in fashion, make-up and restaurants. Jun won the Daesang (or "Grand Prize"), the highest award for television, at the 2014 Baeksang Arts Awards and the 2014 SBS Drama Awards. The drama reestablished Jun as a leader of the hallyu, and she was given the President's Award at the Korean Popular Culture and Arts Awards.

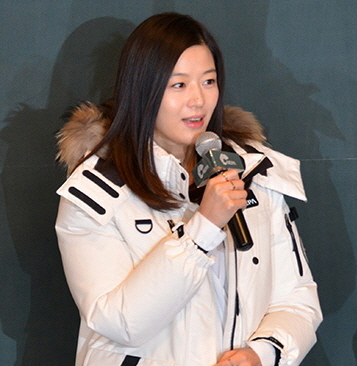
Jun in 2015

In 2015, she reunited with director Choi Dong-hoon for Assassination, an espionage action film set during the 1930s colonial era in which she played a sniper who assembles a squad of independence fighters to kill a Japanese army commander and a pro-Japanese Korean business tycoon. The film was another box-office success for Choi and Jun; Assassination was the highest-grossing Korean film of the year as well as the seventh all-time highest-grossing film in Korean cinema history. Jun was awarded Best Actress at the Grand Bell Awards and Max Movie Awards.

In January 2016, Korean entertainment and media company CJ E&M acquired her agency Culture Depot. The same year, Jun was ranked 8th on Forbes Korea Power Celebrity 40. It was her second consecutive year in the top 10, having been ranked 4th in 2015.

In November 2016, Jun made her small-screen comeback in the SBS fantasy romance drama The Legend of the Blue Sea with Lee Min-ho, reuniting with My Love from the Star scriptwriter Park Ji-eun. Jun ranked 9th on Gallup Korea's list of the 10 best actors of 2016, becoming the only woman to be included.

=== 2017–present: Hiatus and return to television ===
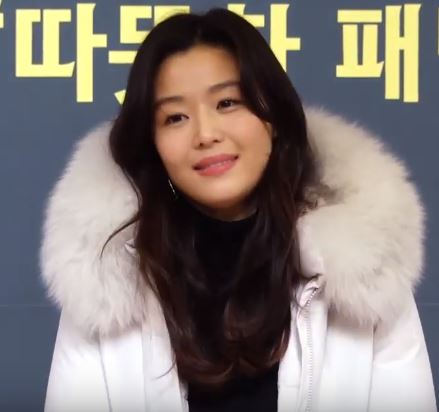
Jun in 2019

In March 2020, Jun made a short appearance in the second season of the Netflix period zombie thriller Kingdom. She was later confirmed to reprise her role and lead the series' sidequel Kingdom: Ashin of the North, alongside her Assassination co-star Park Byung-eun. The Netflix special episode was released worldwide on 23 July 2021.

In April 2020, Jun was confirmed to lead tvN mystery thriller drama Jirisan, written by Kingdom screenwriter Kim Eun-hee, opposite Ju Ji-hoon. The series premiered on 23 October 2021. Jun's 2021 projects marked her small-screen comeback after nearly 5 years of hiatus.

In May 2022, an official from Culture Depot said that her agency's contract expires in June 2022. Later, in August Jun has signed with new agency, Ieum Hashtag.

On 24 June 2025, it was announced that Jun had ended her exclusive contract with Ieum Hashtag. On 7 July, she launched her new agency "Peachy".

In 2025, Jun began filming Yeon Sang-ho's action horror film Colony, her first film role since Assassination (2015).

== Other activities ==
=== Philanthropy ===
In 2014, Jun donated ₩100 million to the Korean Red Cross Society for the victims of the Sewol ferry disaster. She continued making donations of ₩100 million to the Hope Bridge Disaster Relief Association, to aid efforts for the COVID-19 pandemic in 2020, and to help victims of the wildfire that had started in Uljin, Gyeongbuk in 2022.

=== Endorsements ===
Jun is one of the most in-demand celebrity endorsers in South Korea. In 2014, she earned an estimated ₩20 billion from advertising and endorsement fees. Market research in that same year showed that based on the value of real estate holdings, she ranked first among South Korean female celebrities, and fourth out of both male and female. In 2016, Jun earned ₩14 billion for the 14 commercials she has filmed, regaining her position at the top of advertisement rankings.

A lipstick she wore on My Love from the Star, YSL "Rouge Pur Couture No. 52" sold out worldwide, while the same coat she wore on the show caused a surge in sales of over 2,500 in ShesMiss stores in ten days.

In 2015, Jun has been selected by Italian luxury fashion house Gucci as the new face for the brand's Asia exclusive Spring/Summer 2015 Accessories Campaign. The campaign shot in minimalistic aesthetic style, features Gucci accessories bearing its icons - the Horsebit, the Interlocking Gs and Gucci Flora and photographs taken by Sølve Sundsbø in London.

In February 2020, LG Household & Health Care had selected her as the new global ambassador of luxury beauty brand SU:M37.

In 2020, Jun became first Korean ambassador of Alexander McQueen.

In September 2022, Jun became the first South Korean female artist to become global ambassador for British luxury fashion house Burberry. In December 2022, Jun starred as the global face of the Burberry's Holiday Season 2022 campaign. In February 2023, Jun was named as the global face of the Burberry's first campaign under its new chief creative officer Daniel Lee along with Shygirl, Skepta, Vanessa Redgrave, Liberty Ross, Raheem Sterling and more.

In September 2023, Jun became the first brand ambassador for American super-premium skincare brand La Mer and starred in its latest "Youth Everlasting" campaign.

On 11 October 2024, French luxury fashion brand Louis Vuitton selected Jun as its house ambassador.

On 16 April 2025, Swiss luxury watchmaker and jeweller Piaget selected Jun as its global ambassador.

== Personal life ==
=== Marriage ===
Jun married Choi Joon-hyuk on 13 April 2012, at Shilla Hotel in Jangchung-dong, central Seoul, with more than 600 guests, including celebrities, close friends and family attending the wedding. Choi, a banker, is the grandson of famed hanbok designer Lee Young-hee and the son of fashion designer Lee Jung-woo. Congratulatory money from the wedding was donated to charity.

She and Choi have two sons together, born in 2016 and 2018.

=== Legal ===
Jun along with six other Korean stars (Jung Woo-sung, Kim Sun-a, Zo In-sung, Ji Jin-hee, Cha Tae-hyun and Yang Jin-woo) sued the monthly movie magazine Screen in 2006 for commercially using their pictures without permission. The Seoul Central District Court ruled in 2007 that the publisher must pay from ₩5 million to ₩15 million to each star for infringing on their publicity rights.

In 2009, police discovered that Jun's cell phone had been illegally cloned. Seoul Metropolitan Police arrested a private detective, identified as Kim, who testified that it was ordered by SidusHQ (Jun's then agency of 13 years), for which he was paid ₩6.4 million in cash by the brother of the agency's founder and then CEO Jung Hoon-tak. Police said Jun's management company used the cloned phone to keep tabs on her in an attempt to exert control over all aspects of her life. SidusHQ denied the allegations. Jung Hoon-tak was later cleared after police could not find any concrete evidence of his direct involvement. Kim was sentenced to one year in prison for invasion of privacy, Jung's brother received suspended jail terms. Because of the scandal, many expected her to leave once her contract expired, but she surprisingly extended her contract with SidusHQ for one more year. Then in 2011 she set up her own management agency, J&Co. Entertainment, before moving to Culture Depot, an agency owned by a close friend, in 2012.

In 2011, SidusHQ CEO Jung Hoon-tak was accused of illegally using Jun's bank account to pocket profits from a merger and acquisition. Jung allegedly made ₩200 million after purchasing a stake in the junior KOSDAQ-listed Stom E&F in 2009 with an account under Jun's name and announcing through a public filing several months later that he would buy Stom E&F. Jung and Stom E&F's former CEO Kwon Seung-shik were reported for gaining unfair profits by leaking information on the M&A beforehand. In an investigation by the Financial Supervisory Service, Jun testified that she was unaware of such an account existing under her name. Jung issued a denial.

== Filmography ==
=== Film ===
Year	Title	Role	Notes	Ref.
1999	White Valentine	Jung-min		
2000	Il Mare	Eun-joo		
2001	My Sassy Girl	The Girl		
2003	The Uninvited	Yeon		
2004	Windstruck	Yeo Kyung-jin		
2006	Daisy	Hye-young		
2008	A Man Who Was Superman	Song Soo-jung		
2009	Blood: The Last Vampire	Saya Otonashi	Hollywood debut	
2011	Snow Flower and the Secret Fan	Sophia / Snow Flower	Chinese-American co-production	
2012	The Thieves	Yenicall		
2013	The Berlin File	Ryun Jung-hee		
2015	Assassination	Ahn Ok-yun / Mitsuko		
2026	Colony	Kwon Se-jeong		

=== Television series ===
Year	Title	Role	Notes	Ref.
1998	Fascinate My Heart	Ka-yeong		
1999	Happy Together	Seo Yoon-joo		
2013–2014	My Love from the Star	Cheon Song-yi		
2016–2017	The Legend of the Blue Sea	Sim Cheong / Se-hwa		
2020	Kingdom	Ashin	Cameo (season 2)	
2021	Kingdom: Ashin of the North	Ashin	Special episode	
2021	Jirisan	Seo Yi-kang		
2025	Tempest	Seo Mun-ju		
TBA	Human X Gumiho	Goo Ja-hong		

=== Television show ===
Year	Title	Role	Ref.
1998	SBS Popular Song	MC with Kim Seung-hyun	

=== Music video appearances ===
Year	Song title	Artist	Ref.
1997	"Will You Understand" (이해할께)	Cho Kyu Man	
1999	"The Beginning of Love" (사랑의 시작)	Leon Lai	
2000	"Hey Girl"	Jang Hyuk (T.J Project)	
2000	"Love of the Sun and the Moon" (일월지애)	Jang Hyuk (T.J Project)	
2002	"Love Is Always Thirsty" (사랑은 언제나 목마르다)	Yumi	

== Accolades ==
=== Awards and nominations ===
Name of the award ceremony, year presented, category, nominee of the award, and the result of the nomination
Award ceremony	Year	Category	Nominee / Work	Result	Ref.
Asia-Pacific Film Festival	2012	Best Supporting Actress	The Thieves	Nominated	
APAN Star Awards	2014	Hallyu Star Award	My Love from the Star	Won	
APAN Star Awards	2014	Top Excellence Award, Actress in a Miniseries	My Love from the Star	Nominated	
Asian Film Awards	2013	Best Supporting Actress	The Thieves	Nominated	
Asian Film Critics Association Awards	2016	Best Actress	Assassination	Nominated	
Baeksang Arts Awards	1999	Best New Actress (Film)	White Valentine	Won	
Baeksang Arts Awards	2013	Best Supporting Actress (Film)	The Thieves	Nominated	
Baeksang Arts Awards	2014	Grand Prize (Daesang) for TV	My Love from the Star	Won	
Baeksang Arts Awards	2014	InStyle Fashionista Award	Jun Ji-hyun	Won	
Baeksang Arts Awards	2014	Best Actress (TV)	My Love from the Star	Nominated	
Baeksang Arts Awards	2016	Best Actress (Film)	Assassination	Nominated	
Blue Dragon Film Awards	2001	Best Leading Actress	My Sassy Girl	Nominated	
Blue Dragon Film Awards	2015	Best Leading Actress	Assassination	Nominated	
Buil Film Awards	2015	Best Actress	Assassination	Nominated	
Chunsa Film Art Awards	2016	Best Actress	Assassination	Nominated	
Grand Bell Awards	2002	Best Actress	My Sassy Girl	Won	
Grand Bell Awards	2002	Popularity Award	My Sassy Girl	Won	
Grand Bell Awards	2006	Best Actress	Daisy	Nominated	
Grand Bell Awards	2015	Best Actress	Assassination	Won	
Korea Broadcasting Awards	2014	Best Actress	My Love from the Star	Won	
Korea Drama Awards	2014	Grand Prize (Daesang)	My Love from the Star	Nominated	
Korea Tourism Awards	2014	Star of Korean Tourism	Jun Ji-hyun	Won	
Korea World Youth Film Festival	2003	Favorite Actress	My Sassy Girl	Won	
Korea World Youth Film Festival	2016	Favorite Actress	Assassination	Won	
Korean Association of Film Critics Awards	2013	Best Actress	The Berlin File	Nominated	
Korean Entertainment Industry Society	2007	Star (Movie) Award	Jun Ji-hyun	Won	
Korean Popular Culture and Arts Awards	2015	President's Award	Jun Ji-hyun	Won	
Max Movie Awards	2016	Best Actress	Assassination	Won	
New York Asian Film Festival	2026	Extraordinary Star Asia Award	Colony	Won	
Puchon International Fantastic Film Festival	2013	Producer's Choice Award	The Thieves, The Berlin File	Won	
SBS Drama Awards	1999	Netizen Popularity Award	Happy Together	Won	
SBS Drama Awards	1999	New Star Award	Happy Together	Won	
SBS Drama Awards	2014	Best Couple Award	Jun Ji-hyun (with Kim Soo-hyun); My Love from the Star	Won	
SBS Drama Awards	2014	Grand Prize (Daesang)	My Love from the Star	Won	
SBS Drama Awards	2014	PD Award	My Love from the Star	Won	
SBS Drama Awards	2014	Top 10 Star	My Love from the Star	Won	
SBS Drama Awards	2014	Top Excellence Award, Actress in a Drama Special	My Love from the Star	Nominated	
SBS Drama Awards	2016	Best Couple Award	Jun Ji-hyun (with Lee Min-ho); The Legend of the Blue Sea	Won	
SBS Drama Awards	2016	Idol Academy Award – Best Eating (Meokbang)	The Legend of the Blue Sea	Won	
SBS Drama Awards	2016	Top 10 Star Award	The Legend of the Blue Sea	Won	
SBS Drama Awards	2016	Grand Prize (Daesang)	The Legend of the Blue Sea	Nominated	
SBS Drama Awards	2016	Top Excellence Award, Actress in a Fantasy Drama	The Legend of the Blue Sea	Nominated	
Sichuan Television Festival	2015	Best Actress	My Love from the Star	Won	

=== Listicles ===
Name of publisher, year listed, name of listicle, and placement
Publisher	Year	Listicle	Placement	Ref.
Cine 21	2020	Actress to watch out for in 2021	2nd	
Forbes	2014	Korea Power Celebrity 40	34th	
Forbes	2015	Korea Power Celebrity 40	4th	
Forbes	2016	Korea Power Celebrity 40	8th	
Forbes	2017	Korea Power Celebrity 40	23rd	
The Screen	2019	2009–2019 Top Box Office Powerhouse Actors in Korean Movies	22nd	
