= White Valentine =

- Theatrical release poster
- Hangul: 화이트 발렌타인
- RR: Hwaiteu Ballentain
- MR: Hwait'ŭ Pallent'ain
- Directed by: Yang Yun-ho
- Written by: Lee Eun-kyeong; Lee Byeong-ryul
- Produced by: Kim Yong-kuk
- Starring: Park Shin-yang; Jun Ji-hyun
- Cinematography: Lee Seok-gi
- Edited by: Kyung Min-ho
- Music by: Park Ki-young
- Production company: Tae Chang Enterprises
- Release date: February 13, 1999
- Running time: 101 minutes
- Country: South Korea
- Language: Korean

White Valentine (Korean: 화이트 발렌타인) is a 1999 South Korean romantic drama film directed by Yang Yun-ho. It stars Park Shin-yang with Jun Ji-hyun in her film debut. It follows a young woman who re-discovers her childhood pen pal from military service when she happens upon an epistolary exchange he sent to his dead girlfriend by a carrier pigeon. The film was theatrically released on February 13, 1999.

== Plot ==
As a young girl, Kim Jeong-min hated writing letters to soldiers because they never write her back once they learn her age. So instead, she pretends to be a teacher, and becomes pen pals with Park Hyun-jun. They plan to meet in person at a train station, but Jeong-min never shows up, and thus their correspondence ends.

Later when Jeong-min reaches the age of twenty (though when this movie was shot Jun was only 17), Hyun-jun moves into her hometown. Since her parents died when she was little, Jeong-min has been living with her grandfather who owns the bookstore Somang Books. She also works at this bookstore but dreams of becoming a painter. Hyun-jun has become the owner of a pet shop for birds, and grieving over the death of his girlfriend in a car accident, he keeps sending her letters via carrier pigeon. While painting outdoors, Jeong-min sees Hyun-jun feeding some pigeons. As she watches him care for one wounded pigeon then give an apple to a child playing nearby, she falls in love with him at first sight. But the apple reminds her of the same apple painted on the envelopes from her yet unknown pen pal.

== Cast ==
- Park Shin-yang - Park Hyun-jun
- Jun Ji-hyun - Kim Jeong-min
- Jeon Moo-song - Jeong-min's grandfather
- Kim Young-ok - flower shop lady
- Yang Dong-geun - Han-seok
- Kim Se-joon - Ji-seok
- Jin-woo Kang - Postman

== Reception ==
=== Box office ===
As of March 5, 2025, White Valentine has attracted 26,343 viewers nationwide.
