= Ok So-ri =

South Korean actress

- Hangul: 옥보경
- RR: Ok Bogyeong
- MR: Ok Pogyŏng

Stage name
- Hangul: 옥소리
- RR: Ok Sori
- MR: Ok Sori

Ok Bo-gyeong (Korean: 옥보경; born 23 December 1968), better known by the stage name Ok So-ri (옥소리), is a South Korean actress. Ok made her debut in a TV commercial in 1987. She appeared in the TV series Hero's Diary in 1994.

== Adultery case ==
In 2008, she was accused of adultery with an opera singer, and an Italian chef working at a Seoul luxury hotel. Her husband, Park Chul (박철), a radio talk show personality, sought the maximum sentence of two years' imprisonment, while the prosecutors were seeking 18 months. Ok blamed her infidelity on a loveless marriage. She was sentenced, in December 2008, to eight months in prison by a suburban Seoul court, but avoided jail because the sentence was suspended for two years. In September 2008, a lower court had declared both partners jointly responsible for their divorce, and awarded custody of their eight-year-old daughter to Mr. Park.

Ok had been trying to overturn a 1953 law that criminalises extramarital affairs and can send a person to jail for up to two years for adultery. For this purpose she brought a case before the Constitutional Court of Korea, which ruled against the actress and in handling the decision said that society would be harmed if it overturned the law, and that the "two-year jail term is not excessive when comparing it to responsibility." In 2015, South Korea's Constitutional Court overturned the law that made adultery a crime, which had been on the books since 1953.

== Personal life ==
Ok married an Italian in 2011, and gave birth to a son and a daughter. The family lived in Taiwan, but Ok later divorced her second husband. Following their 2014 divorce, her Italian ex-husband received child custody rights and remarried in 2016.

== Filmography ==
- Kuro Arirang (1989)
- Watercolor Painting in a Rainy Day (1989)
- A Sketch of a Rainy Day (1990)
- A Pale Rainy Day (1991)
- Watercolor Painting in a Rainy Day 2 (1993)
- Karuna (1996)
