= Daisy (2006 film) =

2006 South Korean-Hong Kong film by Andrew Lau

- Film poster
- Hangul: 데이지
- RR: Deiji
- MR: Teiji
- Directed by: Andrew Lau
- Written by: Kwak Jae-yong; Gordon Chan; Felix Chong
- Produced by: Teddy Yung
- Starring: Jung Woo-sung; Jun Ji-hyun; Lee Sung-jae
- Cinematography: Andrew Lau
- Edited by: Kim Sang-bum
- Music by: Shigeru Umebayashi; Chan Kwong Wing
- Production companies: iFilm; Basic Pictures
- Distributed by: Showbox (South Korea); Edko Films (Hong Kong)
- Release dates: 9 March 2006 (South Korea); 13 April 2006 (Hong Kong)
- Running time: 110 minutes
- Countries: South Korea; Hong Kong
- Language: Korean
- Budget: US$10 million
- Box office: US$10 million

Daisy (Korean: 데이지) is a 2006 romantic thriller film directed by Andrew Lau. A South Korean-Hong Kong co-production, Daisy is an urban action romance involving young painter Hye-young (Jun Ji-hyun), Interpol detective Jeong Woo (Lee Sung-jae), and professional hitman Park Yi (Jung Woo-sung).

Daisy was produced by iFilm (a SidusHQ subsidiary) and opened in South Korean cinemas on 9 March 2006. There are two versions of Daisy: An Asian cut and an international cut.

== Plot ==
Hye-young (Jun Ji-hyun) is an artist who makes her living by sketching portraits of people for 30 euros per portrait. Park Yi (Jung Woo-sung) is a professional hit man who sees Hye-young painting in the high mountains and instantly falls in love with her.

One day, while Hye-young is trying to cross a small channel connected by a narrow log, she falls down and loses her art bag, which contains all her painting equipment. Park Yi, who had been watching her from a distance, immediately runs to her rescue; but by the time he gets there, Hye-young is gone. He finds the bag she lost and gets the log replaced with a bridge. The next time she comes to paint, Hye-young is taken by surprise at the sight of the new bridge. Though, initially, she thinks the bridge is a coincidence, she is moved when she finds her lost bag hung in the middle of the bridge. She completes her painting of the mountains and leaves it in place of her bag as a gesture of thanks for the person who had built the bridge for her.

From that day on, she starts receiving daisy flowers daily at 4:15 pm sharp. As the days pass, she is touched by the humour of the person who is sending the flowers and develops a soft spot towards the person. On the other hand, Park Yi is afraid she might be hurt if he gets close to her, because of his profession. He subdues his feelings and maintains a distance from her.

Interpol detective Jeong Woo (Lee Sung-jae) is working on a case involving a drug ring. One day, on his way to track the activities of the drug dealers, he encounters Hye-young and her portrait stand. He asks her for his portrait as he surveys the crowd for suspicious activity; this continues for a few more days until one day the drug dealers come to know his hideout.

In the meantime, Hye-young starts to believe that Jeong Woo is the one sending her daisy flowers and instantly falls in love with him. Jeong Woo also hides the fact for fear of blowing his cover.

Park Yi, who has been constantly keeping an eye on Hye-young and Jeong Woo, notices a few gangsters advancing towards them with armed pistols. Park Yi instantly grabs his sniper and starts shooting the crooks. He shoots Jeong Woo in the shoulder, in order to save him from the anticipated bullet of a gangster targeting him. Hye-young gets shot in the neck by the gangster's bullet when trying to protect Jeong Woo, leaving her mute for the rest of her life. Jeong Woo is crushed with guilt, for he considers himself responsible for this entire episode.

Jeong Woo is transferred back to Korea, leaving Hye-young alone and heartbroken. Park Yi cannot help himself with Hye-young's condition and starts showing up and moving close to her. Hye-young is still in love with Jeong Woo and cannot forget him.

After a year, Jeong Woo comes back to the Netherlands and surprisingly shows up on Hye-young's doorsteps. He apologises for the entire episode and leaves her in tears. Meanwhile, Jeong Woo's boss, who wants to solve the case behind this whole episode, tells Jeong Woo to catch the guy who shot the gangsters. Further investigation reveals Park Yi's identity as professional hit man, and they set a trap.

Jeong Woo's boss contracts Park Yi's dealer to kill Jeong Woo in a plot to catch Park Yi. Jeong Woo shows up in a car secretly surrounded by many undercover cops. Jeong Woo came to know Park Yi as Hye-young's friend when he had gone to apologise to her. Park Yi suddenly shows up and asks Jeong Woo for a private talk. Jeong Woo stalls all the cops, saying that he is going to speak with a friend and is later found shot in the head. (Although Park Yi reveals his real identity and refuses to kill him, Jeong Woo is shot by another assassin belonging to Park Yi's group.)

Jeong Woo's boss gives hints of the activities of the man who killed Jeong Woo to Hye-young at Jeong Woo's funeral. Hye-young instantly realises who the killer is. Hye-young holds Park Yi at gunpoint but fails to pull the trigger and falls unconscious due to the spiked tea she drank moments before.

Meanwhile, Jeong Woo's boss devises a much tougher plan to catch Jeong Woo's assassin by targeting himself for a contract killing. A series of events leads Hye-young to realise that Park Yi was the one sending her the daisies. Park Yi, who is all set to assassinate Jeong Woo's boss, is taken by surprise when Hye-young shows up asking him to stop. The assassin responsible for Jeong Woo's death shoots at Park Yi, but the bullet is intercepted by Hye-young, who sees the reflection of the car that the assassin is in on a building opposite, and she dies.

Park Yi takes his revenge by killing his entire gang. He confronts his boss President Cho in a Mexican standoff and they both shoot at each other. He later stumbles out of the building and limps down the street.

The epilogue shows Park Yi, Jeong Woo, and Hye-young standing in a crowd under an overhang, waiting for the rain to stop. When they spot each other, they smile.

== Cast ==
- Jung Woo-sung as Park Yi
- Jun Ji-hyun as Hye-young
- Lee Sung-jae as Jeong Woo
- Chun Ho-jin as Detective Jang
- David Chiang as President Cho
- Dion Lam as Yun Joon-ha

== Production ==
The film was shot entirely in the Netherlands, for the most part in the city of Amsterdam, Haarlem and Epen.
