= Watercolor Painting in a Rainy Day 2 =

- Film poster
- Hangul: 비오는 날 수채화 2
- RR: Bioneun nal suchaehwa 2
- MR: Pionŭn nal such'aehwa 2
- Directed by: Kwak Jae-yong
- Written by: Kwak Jae-yong
- Produced by: Jeong Ji-hoon
- Starring: Lee Geung-young; Ok So-ri
- Cinematography: Yang Yeong-gil
- Edited by: Kim Hyeon
- Music by: Gang In-won
- Distributed by: Screenline
- Release date: September 25, 1993 (South Korea)
- Running time: 119 minutes
- Country: South Korea
- Language: Korean

Watercolor Painting in a Rainy Day 2 (Korean: 비오는 날 수채화 2; RR: Bioneun nal suchaehwa 2) is a 1993 South Korean film, the sequel of Watercolor Painting in a Rainy Day (1989).

== Plot ==
Ji-su is finally released from jail and reunites with his stepsister Ji-hyeon. However his father had dark secret that neither of them knew before; both Ji-su and Ji-hyeon are half-siblings.

== Cast ==
- Ok So-ri
- Lee Geung-young
- Kim Myeong-su
- Kim Seok-hun
- Kim In-moon
- Lee Nak-hoon
- Gwak Chan
- Park Cheol-gu
- Park Sang-ah
- Kim Ji-young
