= Boku to Star no 99 Nichi =

- Poster
- Genre: Drama
- Directed by: Masahiro Kunimoto; Tomomi Okubo
- Starring: Hidetoshi Nishijima; Kim Tae-hee
- Opening theme: Spitz-Time Travel
- Country of origin: Japan
- Original languages: Japanese; Korean
- No. of seasons: 1
- No. of episodes: 10

Production
- Producers: Yukitoshi Chiba; Tomomi Okubo
- Camera setup: Multi-camera
- Running time: 54 minutes
- Production company: Fuji TV

Original release
- Network: Fuji TV
- Release: October 2011 – December 2011

Boku to Star no 99 Nichi (僕とスターの99日, (My) 99 Days with the Superstar) is a Japanese television series which premiered on Fuji TV in October 2011. It starred Japanese actor Hidetoshi Nishijima and Korean actress Kim Tae-hee.

In the romantic comedy, quiet Japanese security guard Namiki Kohei (Hidetoshi Nishijima), whose only real interest seems to be astronomy, is ordered to bodyguard top Korean actress Han Yoo-Na (Kim Tae-hee) at an exceptional production set in Japan.

== Plot ==
Kohei is a single man approaching his 40s who has a part-time job at a security company. He has a sweet and handsome appearance, of which some people take advantage. Easily swayed by those around him, Kohei often takes care of his sister's three kids because of her habit of taking off to exotic locations in pursuit of various short-lived relationships. Still, he is a passionate man and dreams of finding his star. But because of his family and economic situation, he can't follow through on those dreams.

One day, Kohei is assigned as security for Han Yoo-Na for a period of 99 days. Yoo-Na is a pure and kind person. Even though she appears nearly perfect and very stylish, she prefers to act like a normal person. She enjoys eating simple Japanese food and on the film set Yoo-Na tries to take time out of her busy schedule to help others. She seems to be envied by all, but actually feels lonely due to being an idol who is supposed to keep her distance from others. Unknown to others, she has a sad secret and this, as well as her desire to try out different foods while she is in Japan, causes her to escape her hotel at night, leading to various escapades as Kohei has to retrieve her and escort her back to the hotel. These escapades regularly land Kohei in trouble.

At first, Kohei and Yoo-Na don't seem to get along due to his somewhat clumsy behavior and because his responsibility for keeping her out of trouble conflicts with her wish for some freedom. But as the deadline of 99 days approaches, their relationship undergoes some changes.

== Cast ==
- Hidetoshi Nishijima as Kohei Namiki, a clumsy and therefore accident prone security guard whose only real interest seems to be astronomy. His dream is to find and name a previously unknown star.
- Kim Tae-hee as Han Yoo-na, a top Korean actress.
- Nanami Sakuraba as Momo, Kohei's older niece, a high school student who wants to become a dancer.
- Ok Taec-yeon as Tae-sung, a mysterious young Korean (Yoo-na's long lost younger brother, from whom she was separated when their parents divorced very early)
- Jun Kaname as Kazuya, a wily paparazzi reporter
- Hideo Ishiguro as Tamotsu Kondou, Kohei's co-worker
- Mitsuko Baisho as Emiko Saegusa, Kohei's boss and long-time friend of Naoko Serizawa
- Mayumi Asaka as Naoko Serizawa, Yoo-na's manager
- Hanae Kan as Chun Hi-Jin, Yoo-na's assistant
- Tomoko Ikuta as Yukiko Namiki, Kohei's flighty sister and mother of Momo, Sumire and Ren
- Kuranosuke Sasaki as Yamato Takanabe, Yoo-na's co-star and long ago schoolmate of Kohei, when he was overweight and known as Ganmo, something he wants to hide. Self-regarding and infatuated with Yoo-na, who respects him as an actor but has no romantic interest in him
- Yuki Furukawa as Sumiyoshi Natsume, Takanabe's assistant, who falls for his counterpart Hi-jun
- Ai Kato as Kumada Kozue, a friend of Kohei who works at the observatory where Kohei aspires to work (Ep. 6, 8-9)
- Uwa Ishibashi and Shoma Suginomori as the children Sumire and Ren Namiki, Kohei's niece and nephew

== Production ==
Boku to Star no 99 Nichi was first announced by Fuji TV on August 25, 2011. The main cast for this television series was also revealed to be actor Hidetoshi Nishijima and Korean actress Kim Tae-hee. Kim had previously starred in the popular Korean television series IRIS, but this was her first role in a Japanese television series. This role also required her to speak most of her lines in Japanese, which she was able to do fluently with a light Korean accent. Boku to Star no 99 Nichi was also Nishijima's first lead role in a television drama aired on one of the commercial television networks in Japan. He previously starred in the television drama series School!! which was aired in January 2011 in the same drama time slot.

Nanami Sakuraba was announced as one of this television series' additional cast members on September 8, 2011. She played the role of Kohei's niece, a high school student who has to care for her younger siblings in place of her absent mother. She dreams of becoming a dancer but gets no recognition for her dancing.

On September 29, 2011, it was announced that singer Taecyeon and actor Jun Kaname would star in this television series. Taecyeon, who is a member of the K-pop group 2PM, played his first regular role in a Japanese television series. He previously appeared in one episode of the Japanese television series BOSS. His role in the television series was not announced but he played Kim Tae-hee's long lost younger brother. Actor Jun Kaname played the role of a paparazzi reporter in this television series.

== Episodes ==
	Episode title	Broadcast date	Ratings
Ep. 1	まさかの恋はまさかの期限付き... 警備員×女優！キケンな2人のフルスロットルラブ	October 23, 2011	10.2%
Ep. 2	キケンな2人急接近スターが我が家に不法侵入！？ヒミツの一夜	October 30, 2011	9.7%
Ep. 3	キケンな2人急展開星が繋ぐ運命の三角形再会は衝撃の幕開け	November 6, 2011	9.0%
Ep. 4	キケンな2人の罪と罰！解雇！罠にはまる姉弟	November 13, 2011	10.4%
Ep. 5	約束を守れなかったキケンな二人...夢が、星が、遠く引き裂く	November 20, 2011	8.3%
Ep. 6	背を向けたフタリ...もう元には戻れない！星空の下涙のエール	November 27, 2011	9.6%
Ep. 7	今夜、運命のキス！ついに恋が走り出す	December 4, 2011	7.8%
Ep. 8	ガンモ決死の参戦で号泣！最後の笑顔は誰の為	December 11, 2011	9.1%
Ep. 9	幸せになるために！勇気と冒険の最終章	December 18, 2011	8.4%
Ep. 10	愛する者達の贈り物 俺だけの星を見つけた！	December 25, 2011	10.9%
Ratings for Kanto region (average rating: 9.3%)

== International broadcast ==
- Thailand: Channel 7 - aired beginning March 6, 2014, on Wednesdays to Fridays.
- Sri Lanka - WakuWaku Japan - Began airing in October 2016 with English subtitles.
- IndonesiaMyanmarSingapore - WakuWaku Japan - Began airing April 11, 2017, on Tuesdays with English and Indonesian subtitles.
- Taiwan - WakuWaku Japan - Began airing April 3, 2017, on Mondays with Chinese subtitles.
- United States - formerly in Crunchyroll from 2015.

Preceded by Hanazakari no Kimitachi e (10/7/2011 - 18/9/2011)	Fuji TV Dramatic Sunday ドラマチック・サンデー; Sundays 21:00 - 21:54 (JST)	Succeeded by Hayami-san to Yobareru Hi (15/1/2012 - 18/3/2012)
