= Forbidden Love (2004 TV series) =

South Korean television series

- Promotional poster
- Also known as: Tale of the Nine-Tailed Fox; Fox with Nine Tails
- Hangul: 구미호외전
- Hanja: 九尾狐外傳
- RR: Gumihooejeon
- MR: Kumihooejŏn
- Written by: Hwang Sung-yeon; Lee Kyung-mi
- Directed by: Kim Hyung-il
- Starring: Kim Tae-hee; Jo Hyun-jae; Jun Jin; Han Ye-seul; Park Joon-seok; Uhm Tae-woong
- Music by: Kim Seon-min
- Country of origin: South Korea
- Original language: Korean
- No. of episodes: 16

Production
- Executive producer: Hong Sung-deok
- Producer: Jin Hyung-wook
- Running time: Mondays and Tuesdays at 21:50 (KST)
- Production company: Pan Entertainment

Original release
- Network: KBS2
- Release: July 19 – September 7, 2004

Forbidden Love (Korean: 구미호외전; RR: Gumihooejeon; lit. 'Tale of the Nine-Tailed Fox') is a 2004 South Korean television series starring Kim Tae-hee, Jo Hyun-jae, Jun Jin and Han Ye-seul. It aired on KBS2 from July 19 to September 7, 2004 on Mondays and Tuesdays at 21:50 for 16 episodes.

The series follows gumiho (nine-tailed foxes) who live disguised as humans, and the conflicts faced by fox warriors who fall in love with humans.

== Plot ==
Yoon Shi-yeon (Kim Tae-hee) is a gumiho living undercover among humans; her entire family was massacred when she was young. By day she works at a natural history museum, and by night she is a high-ranking warrior of the Nine-Tailed Fox clan, tasked with maintaining the balance between humans and foxes. When a series of murders is discovered in which the victims' internal organs have been removed, detective Kang Min-woo (Jo Hyun-jae) suspects a link to organ trafficking and goes undercover in a smuggling ring. After his cover is blown, he survives only through the intervention of Shi-yeon and fellow fox warrior Moo-young (Jun Jin), and in the process discovers their true identities.

== Production ==
The series was promoted as a fusion science fiction miniseries, with Kim Tae-hee and Han Ye-seul cast as gumiho warriors who fall in love with humans. A dedicated set for the series was built in Nam District, Gwangju. Kim said she was drawn to the role by its dual nature, as her character is an intelligent, innocent museum curator by day and a cold gumiho by night.

== Cast ==
- Kim Tae-hee as Yoon Shi-yeon
- Jo Hyun-jae as Inspector Kang Min-woo
- Jun Jin as Moo-young
- Han Ye-seul as Chae-yi
- Park Joon-seok as Rang
- Uhm Tae-woong as Sa-joon
- Lee Hwi-hyang as Senator Shin Soo-jang
- Dokgo Young-jae as Bureau chief Jang
- Kwon Hae-hyo as Detective Moon
- Jung Kook-jin as K
- Lee Sang-in as Kim Young-mo
- Kim Ji-woo as Kang Min-joo, Min-woo's sister
- Kim Ye-ryeong as Kang Joo-sun
- Seo Yoo-jung as Jung Se-kyung
- Kim Ae-ran as Lee Su-ri
- Kim Hak-chul as Nam Joon-woo
- Kim Ye-jin
- Sunwoo Sun
- Seo Yeon-joo

== Awards ==
- 2004 KBS Drama Awards: Best New Actress - Kim Tae-hee
