= Kuro Arirang =

- Hangul: 구로아리랑
- RR: Guro arirang
- MR: Kuro arirang
- Directed by: Park Jong-won
- Written by: Lee Ha-yeong
- Produced by: Park Chong-chan
- Starring: Ok So-ri; Lee Geung-young; Choi Min-sik
- Cinematography: Chung Kwang-suk
- Edited by: Ree Kyoung-ja
- Music by: Kim Young-dong
- Distributed by: Hwacheon Trading Co.
- Release date: July 1, 1989
- Running time: 119 minutes
- Country: South Korea
- Language: Korean

Kuro Arirang (Korean: 구로아리랑; RR: Guro arirang) is a 1989 South Korean drama film directed by Park Jong-won. It stars Ok So-ri and Lee Geung-young and marks the debut of Choi Min-sik and Shin Eun-kyung. The film caused a stir over labor issues.

== Premise ==
The film depicts the story of four people working in a sewing factory in Guro Industrial Complex in Seoul and the problems they face.

== Cast ==
- Ok So-ri
- Lee Geung-young
- Yoon Ye-ryeong
- Choi Min-sik
- Lee Ki-yeol
- Kim Na-young
- Shin Eun-kyung
- Lee Min-gyeong
- Lee Gwang-hui
- Kim Ui-sang
