= Out to the World =

- Poster
- Hangul: 세상 밖으로
- Hanja: 世上밖으로
- RR: Sesang bakkeuro
- MR: Sesang pakkŭro
- Directed by: Yeo Kyun-dong
- Written by: Yeo Kyun-dong
- Produced by: Park Sang-in; Kim Hyeon-taek
- Starring: Moon Sung-keun; Lee Geung-young
- Cinematography: Yoo Young-gil
- Edited by: Kim Hyeon
- Music by: Kim Jong-seo
- Distributed by: Ik Young Films Co., Ltd
- Release date: May 22, 1994 (South Korea)
- Running time: 100 minutes
- Country: South Korea
- Language: Korean

Out to the World (Korean: 세상 밖으로) is a 1994 South Korean black comedy film.

== Synopsis ==
A satirical allegory of contemporary South Korean politics, the film follows the exploits of two convicts who accidentally escape while being transferred to another prison. Before they can turn themselves back into custody, they meet a female outlaw. She persuades the pair of prisoners to rob a bank in Seoul. When their robbery turns into an embarrassing fiasco, the two decide to flee to the North Korean border.

== Cast ==
- Moon Sung-keun as Sung-keun
- Lee Geung-young as Geung-young
- Shim Hye-jin as Hye-jin
- Lee Dong-jin as Congressman
- Yang Hee-kyung as Gas Station Attendant
- Park Young-pal as Storekeeper
- Myung Gye-nam as Lieutenant
- Kim Ha-rim
- Kwon Hae-hyo
- Lee Du-il

== Awards ==
- Grand Bell Awards (1995) Best New Director (Yeo Kyun-dong)

== Bibliography ==
- Brennan, Sandra. "Out to the World". Allmovie.
- Kim, Kyung-hyun (2004). "2. Nowhere to Run: Disenfranchised Men on the Road in The Man with Three Coffins, Sopyonje, and Out to the World". The Remasculinization of Korean Cinema. Durham and London: Duke University Press. pp. 66–76. ISBN 0-8223-3267-1.
- "Out to the world(Sesangbakk-eulo)(1994)". KMDb Korean Movie Database.
- Sae sang bakuro (1994) at IMDb
