= Autumn Trip =

- Film poster
- Directed by: Kwak Jae-yong
- Written by: Kwak Jae-yong
- Produced by: U Jong-sik; Yun Gang-hyeok
- Starring: Lee Mi-yeon; Lee Geung-young; Kim Min-jong
- Cinematography: Yang Yeong-gil
- Edited by: Kim Hyeon
- Music by: Um In-ho
- Release date: February 9, 1991 (South Korea)
- Running time: 119 minutes
- Country: South Korea
- Language: Korean

Autumn Trip (Korean: 가을여행; RR: Gaeul yeohaeng) is a 1991 South Korean film by Kwak Jae-yong. It revolves around the journeys of five people who venture on different paths to discover their wounds.

== Cast ==
- Lee Mi-yeon
- Lee Geung-young
- Kim Min-jong
- Gang Mun-hui
- Choi Hak-rak
- Lee Ki-yeol
- Chu Seok-yang
- Kim Hyeon-jeong
- Byeon Hye-jin
- Han Jeong-ho
