= Watercolor Painting in a Rainy Day =

- Film poster
- Hangul: 비오는 날 수채화
- RR: Bioneun nal suchaehwa
- MR: Pionŭn nal such'aehwa
- Directed by: Kwak Jae-yong
- Written by: Kwak Jae-yong
- Produced by: Yun Gang-hyeok
- Starring: Kang Suk-hyoun; Ok So-ri; Lee Geung-young
- Cinematography: Yang Yeong-gil
- Edited by: Kim Hyeon
- Music by: Gang In-won
- Release date: February 17, 1989 (South Korea)
- Running time: 119 minutes
- Country: South Korea
- Language: Korean

Watercolor Painting in a Rainy Day (Korean: 비오는 날 수채화; RR: Bioneun nal suchaehwa, English title according to Cine21 is A Sketch of a Rainy Day) is the 1989 South Korean debut film by director Kwak Jae-yong. The sequel Watercolor Painting in a Rainy Day 2 was released in 1993.

== Plot ==
The story of Ji-su who life was torn by two women in his life. One of them is his step-sister and the other is a barroom dancer named Kyung-ja.

== Cast ==
- Kang Suk-hyoun
- Ok So-ri
- Lee Geung-young
- Shin Seong-il
- Kim In-moon
- Lee Ki-yeol
- Bang Eun-hee
- Kim Young-ok
- Chu Seok-yang
- Han Jeong-ho
