= Windstruck =

- Theatrical release poster
- Hangul: 내 여자친구를 소개합니다
- Hanja: 내 女子親舊를 疏開합니다
- RR: Nae yeoja chingureul sogaehamnida
- MR: Nae yŏja ch'in'gurŭl sogaehamnida
- Directed by: Kwak Jae-yong
- Written by: Kwak Jae-yong
- Produced by: Jeong Hun-tak; Bill Kong
- Starring: Jun Ji-hyun; Jang Hyuk
- Cinematography: Jeong Han-cheol
- Edited by: Kim Sang-bum
- Music by: Choi Seung-hyun
- Distributed by: CJ Entertainment
- Release date: June 3, 2004
- Running time: 123 minutes
- Country: South Korea
- Language: Korean
- Box office: US$25.8 million

Windstruck (Korean: 내 여자친구를 소개합니다; lit. 'Let me introduce (you to) my girlfriend') is a 2004 South Korean romantic drama film written and directed by Kwak Jae-yong, starring Jun Ji-hyun and Jang Hyuk. The film held its premiere in Hong Kong, attended by Jang and Jun, on 28 May 2004, being the first Korean film to do so. It was released on June 3, 2004, by CJ Entertainment and ran at 123 minutes.

== Plot ==
The film stars Jun Ji-hyun as Officer Yeo Kyung-jin, an ambitious young female police officer serving on the Seoul police department. One day while chasing a purse snatcher, she accidentally captures Go Myung-woo (played by Jang Hyuk), a physics teacher at an all-girls school, who was actually trying to catch the thief. Later, Myung-woo discovers the stolen purse, but just as he picks it up, Kyung-jin spots him and tries to arrest him again. Kyung-jin is then given the job of escorting Myung-woo through a dangerous district, only to be distracted when she tries to break up a meeting between Russian Mafia and Korean gangsters. With Myung-woo handcuffed to her, Kyung-jin almost single-handedly brings down the two rival gangs (although she is helped when she accidentally causes the groups to start shooting at each other).

The first half of the film, told from Myung-woo's point of view, details the couple's growing attraction and love for each other, which climaxes with a trip to the countryside where Myung-woo tells Kyung-jin that if he were ever to die, he wanted to come back to earth as the wind. Soon after, he is almost killed in a freak automobile accident, but Kyung-jin saves his life.

The film takes a turn into the fantasy genre in its second half after Myung-woo is accidentally shot and killed by another officer (although the situation is such that Kyung-jin thinks that it was her shot that killed him) as Kyung-jin chases after a criminal. Kyung-jin falls into a suicidal depression over his death and attempts to kill herself several times, almost succeeding when she throws herself off a building, only to be saved when a giant balloon floats under her. Soon after, she experiences visitations from Myung-woo, who appears as the wind, sending her messages and, at one point, he even appears in her dreams in order to give her the will to live after she is nearly shot to death by a criminal.

Ultimately the film follows a similar path set out by the American film Ghost with Myung-woo and Kyung-jin communicating and sharing one final gesture of love before he moves on to the afterlife. Myung-woo said that he will whisper, when she hears him whisper in the wind, she will meet someone with a soul like him. Myung-woo told Kyung-jin that he will always be beside her inside a book with a photo left by Myung-woo in the restaurant before he rushed to meet Kyung-jin who was chasing the insane criminal.

In the first half of the film, Myung-woo told that his only memory of high school was his high school trip. The book and the photo is found and returned to Kyung-jin in the police station. The photo showed that on Myung-woo's trip, Kyung-jin was nearby. This proved Myung-woo's "I'm always beside you" was true to Kyung-jin. Kyung-jin rushed out to locate the finder of the book, ultimately ending up in the train station, where she is saved by Cha Tae-hyun's character (credited as The Guy). Myung-woo whispered that The Guy is the one with the soul like him. Kyung-jin whispers that "he is always beside her."

== Cast ==
- Jun Ji-hyun as Officer Yeo Kyung-jin
- Jang Hyuk as Go Myung-woo
- Kim Jung-tae as Kim Young-ho
- Kim Soo-ro as hostage taker
- Lee Ki-woo as Prince
- Im Ye-jin as female cop of police substation
- Kim Chang-wan as chief of police substation
- Jung Ho-bin as criminal Shin Chang-soo
- Jung Dae-hoon as runaway boy 1
- Jeon Jae-hyung as runaway boy 2
- Oh Jung-se as police corporal Jo / prince 1
- Jeon Sung-ae as police deputy
- Kim So-yeon as female student
- Woo Ki-hong as gangster
- Son Young-soon as old woman
- Kim Kwang-kyu as undercover cop / prince 3
- Lee Sang-hoon as Detective Min
- Seo Dong-won as Moon-ho
- Kim Jin-soo as high school student
- Min Young as hostage
- Lee Jung-hoon as doctor
- Kim Jong-min
- Cha Tae-hyun as man on train platform (cameo)

== Connections to My Sassy Girl ==
Windstruck shares the same leading actress and director as an earlier popular South Korean film, My Sassy Girl. As a result, Windstruck contains several subtle references to the previous film. It is also worth noting that throughout both movies Jun Ji-hyun's characters have an overall cheerful and sassy personality but soon revealing sadness and emotion.

Jun Ji-hyun also plays the piano in both movies, where a photo of Jun Ji-hyun from My Sassy Girl is visible on Kyung-jin's piano.

When Kyung-jin is chasing Sin Chang-su she tells a random citizen to act as a steppingstone to climb over the wall, just like when she accidentally steps on a runaway soldier (played by the same actor) when she and Tae-hyun visited the amusement park during her birthday.

In the start of My Sassy Girl she is distraught over a boyfriend that died (though the reason was never disclosed) before meeting Cha Tae-hyun, and in Windstruck her boyfriend (Myung-woo) died due to hunting Sin Chang-su. The explains why the final scene of Windstruck in which Kyung-jin is saved by new soul mate (played by Cha Tae-hyun, the male lead from My Sassy Girl) on a train platform, is very similar to the beginning of My Sassy Girl, essentially setting up Windstruck as a spiritual prequel to My Sassy Girl.

== Soundtrack listing ==
There are several editions of the OST CD made for release in Korea, Japan, and other countries. The original 2005 Korea & Japan versions issued by Trax contains 23 tracks, 17 on disc 1 and the 5 by YouMe on disc 2. Other versions may not have all tracks. The theme song "Tears" composed by Yoshiki and performed by X Japan, was the first Japanese song to be featured in a Korean film after World War II.

1. 재회의 테마 [Reunion Theme]
2. "Knockin' On Heaven's Door" (Orchestra Ver.)
3. II명우의 수난 [The Passion of Myung-woo]
4. 옷 바꿔입기 [Changing Clothes](Stay Pizzicato Ver.)
5. 일하자 [Let's Begin!](Le Piccadilly) - Erik Satie
6. 까페에서 [At the Cafe]
7. "Stay" - Maurice Williams & Zodiacs
8. 오프로드 [The Road Trip](Stay String Version)
9. 다섯 번째 청혼자 [The Fifth Suitor]
10. 새끼손가락의 전설 [Legend of Joining Pinkies]
11. 강물 속으로 [Into The River]
12. 거기 어디야? [Where are you?]
13. "BK Love" - MC Sniper
14. "Tears" - X Japan
15. 애드벌룬 - 그의 손 [An Ad-balloon - His Hand]
16. 종이비행기 [Paperplane]
17. 재회의테마 [Reunion Theme](Fast Ver.)

On CD2:

1. 바람이라도 좋아 - 유미 (YouMe)
2. "Knockin' On Heaven's Door" (ノッキン・オン・ヘブンズ・ドア)/ ユミ (YouMe)
3. 시계를 돌리면 - 유미 (YouMe)
4. "Wind Of Soul [I Will Stay For You]" - 유미 (YouMe)
5. "Going Back To The..." [Piano ver.] - 유미 (YouMe)

== Reception ==
The film was ranked 8th best-selling Korean film of 2004, selling 2,199,359 tickets. In Japan, the film was released on November 12, 2004, and grossed US$17,773,061.
