= Lee Geung-young =

South Korean actor

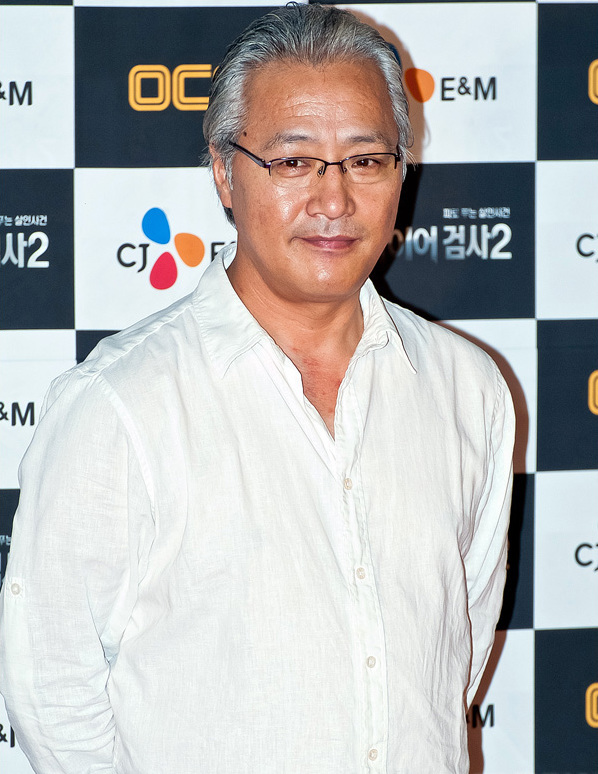
- Lee in 2012
- Born: December 12, 1960 (age 65); Chungju, North Chungcheong Province, South Korea
- Other names: Lee Kyeong-yeong; Lee Kyung-young
- Education: Hanyang University; Theater and Film
- Occupations: Actor; film director
- Years active: 1987–present

Korean name
- Hangul: 이경영
- Hanja: 李璟榮
- RR: I Gyeongyeong
- MR: I Kyŏngyŏng

Lee Geung-young (Korean: 이경영; born December 12, 1960) is a South Korean actor.

== Education and career ==
Lee graduated from the Department of Drama in Seoul. He debuted in 1977 and after completing his mandatory military service, he debuted in 1982 as the 10th public relations actor for the Korea Broadcasting Corporation (KBS), became a voice actor for a year, and re-entered his KBS 18th career in 1983. In 1983, he debuted as an actor in the KBS drama Ordinary People. He also wrote and directed the films The Gate of Destiny (1996) and The Beauty in Dream (2002).

== Filmography ==
*Note; the whole list is referenced.

=== Film ===
Year	English title	Korean title	Role	Notes/Ref.
2022	Birth	탄생		
2022	Come Back Home	컴백홈	Pal-chul	
2021	Sweet & Sour	새콤달콤		Netflix Film
2019	Black Money	블랙머니	Lee Kwang-joo	
2018	The Cyclist King	자전차왕 엄복동		
2018	Monstrum	물괴	Sim Woon	
2018	Snatch Up	머니백	Killer Park	
2018	Gate	게이트	Jang-choon	
2017	Steel Rain	강철비	Kim Kyung-young	
2017	Along With the Gods: The Two Worlds	신과 함께	Great King of the Senses	Special appearance
2017	Man of Will	대장 김창수	Lee Jae-jeong	Cameo
2017	The Battleship Island	군함도	Yoon Hak-cheol	
2017	Real	리얼	Noh Yeom	Special appearance
2017	The Merciless	불한당: 나쁜 놈들의 세상	Byung-chul	
2017	The Mayor	특별시민	Jeong Chi-in	Special appearance
2017	The Prison	프리즌	Head Correctional Officer Bae	
2017	New Trial	재심	Attorney	
2017	I'm Doing Fine in Middle School	중2라도 괜찮아	Taoist Baek-woon	
2016	The Great Actor	대배우	Cannes Park	
2016	Misbehavior	여교사	Board Chairman	Cameo
2016	Pandora	판도라	Prime Minister	
2015	Inside Men	내부자들	Jang Pil-woo	
2015	The Magician	조선마술사		
2015	The Long Way Home	서부전선	Lieutenant Yoo	
2015	Untouchable Lawmen	치외법권	Chief detective Wang	
2015	The Beauty Inside	뷰티 인사이드	Woo-jin's father	
2015	Memories of the Sword	협녀: 칼의 기억	Teacher	
2015	Assassination	암살	Kang In-gook	
2015	Minority Opinion	소수의견	Park Jae-ho	
2015	Perfect Proposal	은밀한 유혹	Kim Seok-gu	
2015	Chronicle of a Blood Merchant	허삼관	Heo Ok-ran's father	
2014	Fashion King	패션왕	Won-ho's father	Cameo
2014	Whistle Blower	제보자	Lee Jang-hwan	
2014	Tazza: The Hidden Card	타짜: 신의 손	Kko-jang	
2014	The Pirates	해적: 바다로 간 산적	So-ma	
2014	Kundo: Age of the Rampant	군도	Ddaeng-choo	
2014	Mr. Perfect	백프로	Principal	
2014	Venus Talk	관능의 법칙	Choi Sung-jae	
2014	Another Promise	또 하나의 약속	Kyo-ik	
2014	Genome Hazard	무명인		
2013	Hwayi: A Monster Boy	화이: 괴물을 삼킨 아이	Im Hyung-taek	
2013	The Terror Live	더 테러 라이브	Cha Dae-eun	
2013	A Journey with Korean Masters	마스터 클래스의 산책 (이헌의 오디세이)	Lee Heon-ik	Short film Lee Heon's Odyssey
2013	New World	신세계	Seok Dong-chool	Cameo
2013	The Berlin File	베를린	Ri Hak-soo	
2012	China Blue	차이나 블루		
2012	26 Years	26년	Kim Gap-se	
2012	National Security	남영동1985	Lee Du-han	
2012	A Company Man	회사원	Ban Ji-hoon	
2012	A Millionaire on the Run	5백만불의 사나이	Congressman Park	
2012	The Concubine	후궁: 제왕의 첩	Chief eunuch	
2012	Spring, Snow	봄, 눈		
2012	Unbowed	부러진 화살	Judge Lee Tae-woo	
2011	Countdown	카운트다운	Jo Myung-suk	
2011	Hindsight	푸른소금	Boss Baek	
2011	War of the Arrows	최종병기 활	Kim Mu-seon	
2011	Moby Dick	모비딕	Professor Jang	
2011	Sunny	써니	Adult Joon-ho	
2011	Be My Guest	죽이러 갑니다	Mr. Kim	
2010	A Better Tomorrow	무적자	Lieutenant Park	
2009	Paju	파주	Gangster boss	
2008	The Divine Weapon	신기전	Geum-oh	
2007	The Mafia, the Salesman	상사부일체	Head monk	
2007	Someone Behind You	두사람이다	Ga-in's father	
2007	Meet Mr. Daddy	눈부신 날에		
2005	The Windmill Palm Grove	종려나무숲	Deep-sea fishing boat captain Choi	
2002	Family	패밀리	Choi Mu-yeong	
2002	Forgive Me Once Again Despite Hatred	미워도 다시한번	Ahn Ji-hwan	
2002	The Beauty in Dream	몽중인	Lee Yoon-ho	
1998	First Kiss	키스할까요	Editor	
1998	The Happenings	기막힌 사내들	Old timer	
1998	Film-making	죽이는 이야기	Harvey	
1997	Maria and the Inn	마리아와 여인숙		
1997	Hallelujah	할렐루야		
1997	Baby Sale	베이비 세일	Sang-joon	
1997	Trio	삼인조		
1997	Holiday In Seoul	홀리데이 인 서울	Telephone operator's boyfriend	
1997	Mister Condom	미스터 콘돔		
1997	Poison	쁘아종		
1997	Change	체인지		
1996	The Gate of Destiny	귀천도	Jwa Eun-keom	
1996	Corset	코르셋	Han Sang-woo	
1995	Runaway	런 어웨이		
1995	A Hot Roof	개같은 날의 오후		
1995	Mom Has a New Boyfriend	엄마에게 애인이 생겼어요		
1995	Terrorist	테러리스트	Oh Sa-hyun	
1995	Bitter and Sweet	남자는 괴로워		
1995	Deep Scratch	손톱	Kim Jung-min	
1994	Young Lover	어린 연인	Eun-woo	
1994	Rules of the Game	게임의 법칙	Man-soo	
1994	Out to the World	세상밖으로	Geung-young	
1994	Life and Death of the Hollywood Kid	헐리우드 키드의 생애		
1994	Rosy Day	장미의 나날	Myung-ho	
1993	To the Starry Island	그 섬에 가고싶다		
1993	Watercolors in Rain 2, The Zelkova Hill	비오는 날 수채화 2		
1993	That Woman, That Man	그 여자, 그 남자	Chang	
1993	In Your Name When the Morning Comes	아침이 오면 그대 이름으로	Jun-yeong	
1993	General Hospital of Love	사랑의 종합병원	Park Min-woo	
1992	Dinosaur Teacher	공룡 선생	Kim Young-woong	
1992	White Badge	하얀전쟁	Pyon Chin-su	
1992	Foolish Lover	백치 애인		
1992	From the Seom River to the Sky	섬강에서 하늘까지		
1991	Death Song	사의 찬미	Hong Nan-pa	
1991	A Pale Rainy Day	하얀 비요일	Mok-ko	
1991	Lost Love	잃어버린 너		
1991	Autumn Journey	가을여행	Cheon-ho	
1991	You Know What? It's a Secret 2	있잖아요 비밀이에요 2		
1990	I'm Gonna Do Something Shocking	난 깜짝 놀랄 짓을 할거야		
1990	Only Because You Are a Woman	단지 그대가 여자라는 이유만으로	Lawyer	
1990	Young Shim	영심이		
1990	You Know What? It's a Secret	있잖아요 비밀이에요		
1990	Song of Resurrection	부활의 노래		
1990	A Sketch of a Rainy Day	비오는 날 수채화		
1989	Kuro Arirang	구로아리랑		
1988	Gam-dong	깜동		
1987	Adada	아다다	Charburner	
1987	Prince Yeon-san's Life	연산일기		

=== Television series ===
Year	English title	Korean title	Role
2023	Dr. Romantic 3	낭만닥터 김사부 3	Cha Ji-man
2022	Adamas	아다마스	Kwon Jae-yoo
2022	Why Her	왜 오수재인가	Han Seong-beom
2022	Doctor Lawyer	닥터로이어	Gu Jin-gi
2022	Again My Life	어게인 마이 라이프	Jo Tae-seop
2021	The Veil	검은 태양	Lee In-hwan
2021	Vincenzo	빈센조	Park Seung-jun
2020	Graceful Friends	우아한 친구들	TBA
2020	The World of the Married	부부의 세계	Yeo Byung-gyu
2020	Hyena	하이에나	Song Pil-Joong
2019	Vagabond	배가본드	Edward Park
2019	Haechi	해치	Min Jin-won
2018	Room No. 9	나인룸	
2018	Misty	미스티	Jang Gyu-seok
2017	Argon	아르곤	Lee Geun-hwa
2017	Stranger	비밀의 숲	Lee Yoon-beom
2017	The Bride of Habaek	하백의 신부	Dae Sa-je
2015	Hidden Identity	신분을 숨겨라	Choi Dae-han/Ghost, NIS Director
2015	D-Day	디 데이	Park Gun
2015	Sense8		Kang-dae Bak
2014	Misaeng: Incomplete Life	미생	Choi Young-hoo
2012	Vampire Prosecutor 2	뱀파이어 검사 2	Jo Jung-hyun
2001	Blue Mist	푸른 안개	Yun Sung-jae
2000	The Thief's Daughter	도둑의 딸	
2000	Fireworks	불꽃	Lee Kang-wook
1999	Love Story "Rose"	러브스토리	
1999	Crystal	크리스탈	
1998	Eun-shil	은실이	Jang Nak-do
1998	Romance	로맨스	
1997	Snail	달팽이	Byung-do
1993	The Distant Songba River	머나먼 쏭바강	Kim Ki-soo

=== Web series ===
Year	Title	Role	Ref.
2022	The King of Pigs	Choi Seok-ki	

=== Music video appearances ===
Year	Song Title	Artist	Ref.
2022	"Notes" (참고사항)	Lee Mu-jin	

== Theater ==
Year	English title	Korean title	Role	Ref.
2022	Post of Love	사랑의 포스트	village chief	

== Awards and nominations ==
Year	Award	Category	Nominated work	Result
1990	28th Grand Bell Awards	Best New Actor	Kuro Arirang	Nominated
1990	10th Korean Association of Film Critics Awards	Best New Actor	A Sketch of a Rainy Day	Won
1990	11th Blue Dragon Film Awards	Best Supporting Actor	A Sketch of a Rainy Day	Nominated
1991	2nd Chunsa Film Art Awards	Best Supporting Actor	Death Song	Won
1991	12th Blue Dragon Film Awards	Best Supporting Actor	Death Song	Won
1992	30th Grand Bell Awards	Best Supporting Actor	Death Song	Won
1992	3rd Chunsa Film Art Awards	Best Supporting Actor	White Badge	Won
1992	13th Blue Dragon Film Awards	Best Actor	White Badge	Nominated
1993	29th Baeksang Arts Awards	Best Actor – Film	White Badge	Won
1993	31st Grand Bell Awards	Best Supporting Actor	White Badge	Won
1993	14th Blue Dragon Film Awards	Best Actor	That Woman, That Man	Nominated
1993	14th Blue Dragon Film Awards	Popular Star Award	That Woman, That Man	Won
1994	30th Baeksang Arts Awards	Most Popular Actor – Film	That Woman, That Man	Won
1994	5th Chunsa Film Art Awards	Best Supporting Actor	Out to the World	Won
1994	15th Blue Dragon Film Awards	Best Actor	Out to the World	Nominated
1994	15th Blue Dragon Film Awards	Best Supporting Actor	Rules of the Game	Nominated
1994	15th Blue Dragon Film Awards	Popular Star Award	Out to the World, Rules of the Game	Won
1995	33rd Grand Bell Awards	Best Actor	Out to the World	Nominated
1996	32nd Baeksang Arts Awards	Best Actor – Film	Runaway	Won
1996	17th Blue Dragon Film Awards	Best New Director	The Gate of Destiny	Nominated
1998	SBS Drama Awards	Excellence Award, Actor	Romance, Eun-shil	Won
1999	SBS Drama Awards	Top Excellence Award, Actor	Love Story "Rose," Crystal	Won
2000	SBS Drama Awards	Top Excellence Award, Actor	Fireworks	Nominated
2001	KBS Drama Awards	Top Excellence Award, Actor	Blue Mist	Nominated
2013	22nd Buil Film Awards	Best Supporting Actor	National Security	Nominated
2014	50th Baeksang Arts Awards	Best Supporting Actor – Film	Venus Talk	Nominated
2014	15th Busan Film Critics Awards	Best Actor	The Pirates	Won
2014	51st Grand Bell Awards	Best Supporting Actor	Whistle Blower	Nominated
2014	35th Blue Dragon Film Awards	Best Supporting Actor	Whistle Blower	Nominated
2015	51st Baeksang Arts Awards	Best Supporting Actor – Film	Whistle Blower	Nominated
2015	35th Golden Cinema Festival	Special Jury Prize	Whistle Blower	Won
2015	24th Buil Film Awards	Best Supporting Actor	Minority Opinion	Won
2015	36th Blue Dragon Film Awards	Best Supporting Actor	Minority Opinion	Nominated
2015	4th APAN Star Awards	Best Supporting Actor	Misaeng: Incomplete Life	Won
2016	21st Chunsa Film Art Awards	Best Supporting Actor	Minority Opinion	Nominated
2016	52nd Baeksang Arts Awards	Best Supporting Actor – Film	Minority Opinion	Won
2016	53rd Grand Bell Awards	Best Supporting Actor	Inside Men	Nominated
2016	Night of Stars - Korea Top Star Awards	Korea's Top Supporting Actor	Inside Men	Won
2017	25th Korea Culture & Entertainment Awards	Top Excellence Award, Actor in Film	The Battleship Island	Won
2019	SBS Drama Awards	Best Supporting Actor	Vagabond	Nominated

== Legal issues ==
Lee was arrested immediately with the charge of prostitution with a minor aged 17 with the promise of starring the girl in a movie in 2002. Out of three intercourses, only two were found to be for the purpose of prostitution. Lee was found guilty and was ordered 160 hours of social service and 10 months of prison time with two years of probation.
