= Kim Tae-hee =

South Korean actress (born 1980)

- Kim in October 2026
- Born: 29 March 1980 (age 46); Ulsan, South Korea
- Education: Seoul National University (BDes in Fashion design)
- Occupation: Actress
- Years active: 2000–present
- Agents: Story J Company (Korea); Sweet Power (Japan)
- Spouse: Rain (m. 2017)
- Children: 2
- Relatives: Lee Wan (brother); Lee Bo-mee (sister-in-law)

Korean name
- Hangul: 김태희
- Hanja: 金泰熙
- RR: Gim Taehui
- MR: Kim T'aehŭi
- Website: storyjcompany.com

Kim Tae-hee (Korean: 김태희; born 29 March 1980) is a South Korean actress. Considered one of South Korea's most beautiful actresses, she is best known for her roles in television series such as Stairway to Heaven (2003–2004), Love Story in Harvard (2004–2005), Iris (2009), My Princess (2011), Yong-pal (2015), and Hi Bye, Mama! (2020).

Kim is referred to as one of "The Troika" along with Song Hye-kyo and Jun Ji-hyun, collectively known by the acronym "Tae-Hye-Ji".

== Early life and education ==
Kim Tae-hee was born on 29 March 1980, in Ulsan, South Korea. Her father is Kim Yoo-moon, who established, and is chairman of, Hankook Union Transportation Company in 1984. She is often involved in various charities to help out underserved youths and broken families in the Ulsan area. She has an older sister, Kim Hee-won, and a younger brother, Kim Hyung-soo (stage name Lee Wan); the latter is also an actor. She attended Samshin Elementary School, Daehyun Middle School, and then enrolled at Ulsan Girls' High School. Through her younger brother, Kim's sister-in-law is professional golfer Lee Bo-mee.

In 1999, Kim moved to Seoul to attend college at the prestigious Seoul National University, where she became the president of the SNU Women's Ski Club. In 2005, she graduated from SNU with a bachelor's degree in fashion design.

== Career ==
=== 2001–2002: Beginnings ===
In 2000, an advertising executive saw Kim riding the subway, and offered her a modeling job. Kim appeared in television commercials and print ads, before making her acting debut with a small role in the 2001 melodrama Last Present. In 2002, she starred in the short film Living in New Town and the sitcom Let's Go, followed by Screen and A Problem at My Younger Brother's House in 2003.

=== 2003–2006: Rising popularity and film debut ===
Kim rose to stardom in 2003 via her portrayal of the evil stepsister in the popular SBS TV series Stairway to Heaven. Starting 2004, Kim was cast in leading roles in her succeeding projects, including the supernatural KBS series Forbidden Love and the SBS campus romance Love Story in Harvard. The latter drew solid viewership ratings nationwide throughout its run with a peak viewer rating of 20 percent and won Kim the Most Popular Actress award in TV category at the Baeksang Arts Awards. Love Story in Harvard was also reportedly well-received by Japanese viewers and contributed to Kim's popularity in the country.

Riding the big success of Stairway to Heaven and Love Story in Harvard, Kim became one of the most sought-after faces in the TV commercial industry. She was picked by Korea Broadcast Advertising Corporation as the top advertising model of the year in 2008, earning her title of "CF Queen". However, Kim expressed her desire to be valued properly as an actor, preferring to succeed based on her acting skills rather than her image.

Kim then turned to film, starring in action fantasy epic The Restless (2006), and the romantic comedy Venus and Mars (2007). However, both were unsuccessful at the box office.

=== 2009–2014: Iris and rising overseas popularity ===
Back on the small screen in 2009, Kim played an NIS profiler in the spy action thriller Iris. It was one of the most expensive Korean dramas ever produced and was a critical and commercial success with an average viewership rating of 30%. Kim shed tears at the KBS Drama Awards when she won an Excellence Award in a Mid-length Drama; which was her first acting award, excluding newcomer and popularity awards.

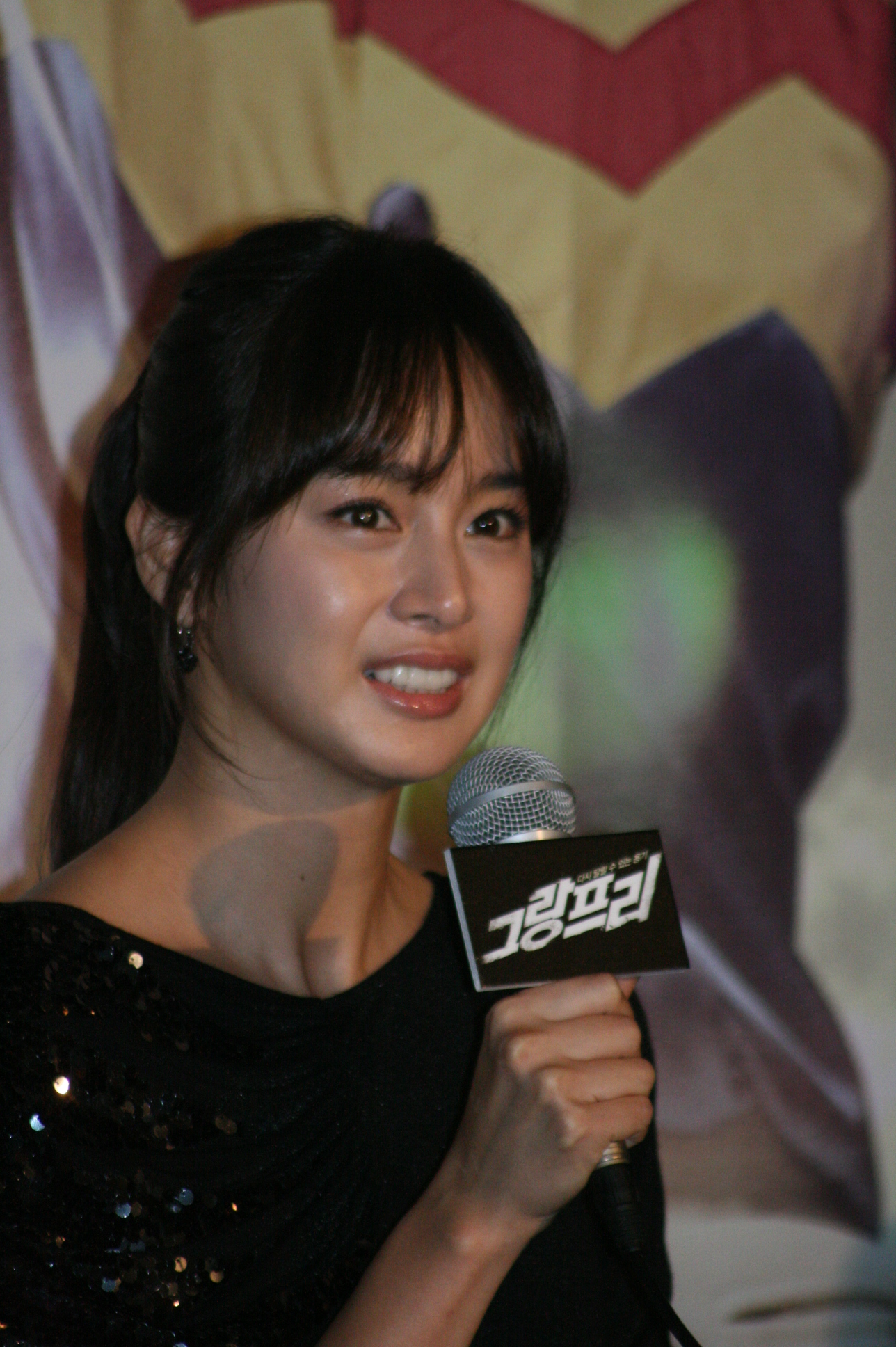
Kim in September 2010

Kim left her then-agency Namoo Actors in January 2010 to join Lua Entertainment, which was founded by her brother-in-law. That year, she also played a horse jockey who dreams of winning the championship in the sports film Grand Prix.

After the success of Iris, she again drew positive reviews in the romantic comedy series My Princess (2011); Kim played an ordinary college student who discovers that she is Korean royalty. Later that year, she starred in her first Japanese television drama Boku to Star no 99 Nichi, where her character is a Korean Wave star who meets an ordinary Japanese bodyguard and he somehow makes her fall head over heels in love with him. The Fuji TV drama, which aired in Japan from October to December 2011, raked in 9 to 10 percent of viewers' ratings on average, launching Kim as a household name in Japan. Kim later encountered backlash from some Japanese netizens for allegedly promoting South Korea's claim in the Liancourt Rocks dispute during her 2005 trip to Switzerland as a goodwill ambassador.

In 2013, Kim starred in her first historical drama Jang Ok-jung, Living by Love as the infamous royal concubine Hui-bin Jang. This was followed by another period role, as the wife of famed Chinese calligrapher Wang Xizhi in the Chinese television drama Saint Wang Xizhi.

=== 2015–present: Career resurgence ===
Kim returned to Korean television in 2015, playing an heiress who recovers from a coma with the help of a doctor-for-hire, the titular Yong-pal. The show garnered strong ratings and Kim won a Top Excellence Acting award from the Korea Drama Awards.

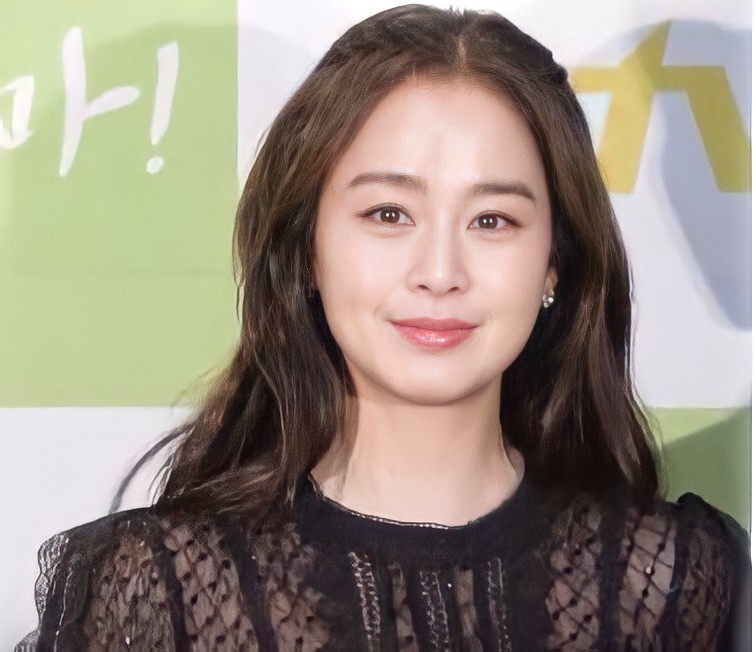
Kim in February 2020

In 2020, Kim returned to television in the family drama series Hi Bye, Mama!.

== Other activities ==
=== Philanthropy ===
In May 2022, Kim donated 200 million won through Hope Bridge National Disaster Mitigation Association to help neighbors affected by the Uljin forest fire 2022, which devastated the area and then spread to Samcheok, South Korea.

On 22 July 2022, Kim donated 1.1 million KF94 masks and face masks to NGO G-Foundation.

== Personal life ==
=== Marriage and family ===
In September 2012, Kim started dating South Korean singer-actor Rain. They married on 19 January 2017.

On 23 May 2017, Kim's agency, Lua Entertainment, announced that Kim was pregnant with their first child. They have two daughters, born October 2017 and September 2019.

=== Religion ===
Kim is a practicing Catholic. She was one of 30 Catholic celebrities who appeared in the 2014 music video for the digital single "Koinonia" to commemorate Pope Francis's visit to South Korea, the first time in 25 years that an incumbent pope visited South Korea. Her baptismal name is Verda.

=== Tax audit ===
Kim and her then-agency Lua Entertainment were audited by the National Tax Service in 2021. Reports in March 2023 said she was assessed additional tax in the millions of won and described the review as a special audit tied to tax-evasion allegations. Story J Company, her agency at the time of the reports, rejected that framing. It said an advertising fee arrived late as her contract with Lua ended, that both Lua and Kim had already reported and paid tax on the income, and that extra tax was paid only because the authorities treated the fee as her personal revenue rather than the former agency's. It said nothing unsavory had occurred and that the additional amount had been paid in full.

== Filmography ==
=== Film ===
Year	Title	Role	Notes
2001	Last Present	Teenage Park Jung-yeon	
2002	Living in New Town	Ji-soo	Short film
2006	The Restless	So-hwa/Yon-hwa	
2007	Venus and Mars	Yoon Jin-ah	
2010	Grand Prix	Seo Ju-hee	
2010	Iris: The Movie	Choi Seung-hee	

=== Television series ===
Year	Title	Role	Notes	Ref.
2002	Let's Go	Tae-hee		
2003	Screen	Kim So-hyun		
2003–2004	A Problem at My Younger Brother's House	Park Su-jin		
2003–2004	Stairway to Heaven	Han Yoo-ri		
2004	Forbidden Love	Yoon Shi-yeon		
2004–2005	Love Story in Harvard	Lee Soo-in		
2009	Iris	Choi Seung-hee		
2011	My Princess	Lee Seol		
2011	Boku to Star no 99 Nichi	Han Yoo-na	Japanese drama	
2013	Jang Ok-jung, Living by Love	Jang Ok-jung		
2015	Yong-pal	Han Yeo-jin		
2020	Hi Bye, Mama!	Cha Yu-ri		
2023	Lies Hidden in My Garden	Moon Joo-ran		
2023	Welcome to Samdal-ri	Herself	Cameo	
2025	Butterfly	Eunju Kim		

=== Music video appearances ===
Year	Title	Artist	Ref.
2002	"Letter"	g.o.d	
2003	"Only"	The Jun	
2004	"Don't Go Away"	Park Yong-ha	
2014	"Koinonia"	Various Korean Catholic celebrities	
2021	"I Like You"	Ciipher	

== Accolades ==
=== Awards and nominations ===
Name of the award ceremony, year presented, category, nominee of the award, and the result of the nomination
Award ceremony	Year	Category	Nominee / Work	Result	Ref.
Andre Kim Best Star Awards	2004	Female Star Award	Stairway to Heaven	Won	
Andre Kim Best Star Awards	2007	Female Star Award	Kim Tae-hee	Won	
APAN Star Awards	2015	Top Excellence Award, Actress in a Miniseries	Yong-pal	Nominated	
Baeksang Arts Awards	2004	Best New Actress – Television	Stairway to Heaven	Nominated	
Baeksang Arts Awards	2005	Most Popular Actress – Television	Love Story in Harvard	Won	
Baeksang Arts Awards	2007	Most Popular Actress – Film	The Restless	Won	
Baeksang Arts Awards	2010	Best Actress – Television	Iris	Nominated	
Blue Dragon Film Awards	2007	Popular Star Award	The Restless	Won	
Blue Dragon Film Awards	2007	Best New Actress	The Restless	Nominated	
Chunsa Film Art Awards	2007	Best New Actress	The Restless	Nominated	
Cosmo Beauty Awards	2013	Asia Dream Star	Kim Tae-hee	Won	
Grand Bell Awards	2007	Overseas Popularity Award	The Restless	Won	
Grand Bell Awards	2007	Best New Actress	The Restless	Nominated	
KBS Drama Awards	2004	Best New Actress	Forbidden Love	Won	
KBS Drama Awards	2009	Best Couple Award	Kim Tae-hee (with Lee Byung-hun); Iris	Won	
KBS Drama Awards	2009	Excellence Award, Actress in a Mid-length Drama	Iris	Won	
KBS Drama Awards	2009	Top Excellence Award, Actress	Iris	Nominated	
Korea Drama Awards	2010	Best Actress	Iris	Nominated	
Korea Drama Awards	2015	Top Excellence Award, Actress	Yong-pal	Won	
Korean Film Awards	2007	Best New Actress	The Restless	Nominated	
MBC Drama Awards	2011	Best Couple Award	Kim Tae-hee (with Song Seung-heon); My Princess	Nominated	
MBC Drama Awards	2011	Popularity Award, Actress	My Princess	Nominated	
MBC Drama Awards	2011	Top Excellence Award, Actress in a Miniseries	My Princess	Nominated	
Pyeongtaek Film Festival	2007	New Currents Movie Star - Best New Actress	The Restless	Won	
SBS Drama Awards	2003	New Star Award	Stairway to Heaven	Won	
SBS Drama Awards	2004	Netizen Popularity Award	Love Story in Harvard	Won	
SBS Drama Awards	2004	Top 10 Stars	Love Story in Harvard	Won	
SBS Drama Awards	2004	Excellence Award, Actress in Drama Special	Love Story in Harvard	Nominated	
SBS Drama Awards	2004	Top Excellence Award, Actress	Love Story in Harvard	Nominated	
SBS Drama Awards	2013	Excellence Award, Actress in a Drama Special	Jang Ok-jung, Living by Love	Nominated	
SBS Drama Awards	2015	Best Couple Award	Kim Tae-hee (with Joo Won); Yong-pal	Won	
SBS Drama Awards	2015	Top 10 Stars	Yong-pal	Won	
SBS Drama Awards	2015	Top Excellence Award, Actress in a Miniseries	Yong-pal	Won	
Seoul International Drama Awards	2011	Outstanding Korean Actress	My Princess	Nominated	

=== Honors ===
Name of organization, year given, and the name of the honor
Country	Organization	Year	Honor	Ref.
South Korea	Newsis K-Expo Cultural Awards (Note: Established in 2019 and co-sponsored by Korea's Ministry of Culture, Sports and Tourism, Ministry of Foreign Affairs, Korea Creative Content Agency, Seoul Metropolitan Council and the Seoul Tourism Organization, it awards cultural icons, businesses, and individuals who have contributed greatly to Hallyu, the Korean wave.)	2023	Seoul Mayor's Award	

=== Listicles ===
Name of publisher, year listed, name of listicle, and placement
Publisher	Year	Listicle	Placement	Ref.
Forbes	2009	Korea Power Celebrity 40	10th	
Forbes	2010	Korea Power Celebrity 40	23rd	
Forbes	2011	Korea Power Celebrity 40	37th	
Forbes	2012	Korea Power Celebrity 40	8th	
Forbes	2013	Korea Power Celebrity 40	24th	
Forbes	2014	Korea Power Celebrity 40	23rd	
