= Venus and Mars (2007 film) =

2007 South Korean romantic comedy film

- Theatrical release poster
- Hangul: 싸움
- RR: Ssaum
- MR: Ssaum
- Directed by: Han Ji-seung
- Written by: Han Ji-seung
- Produced by: Kang Woo-suk; An Sang-hoon
- Starring: Sul Kyung-gu; Kim Tae-hee
- Cinematography: Kim Jae-ho
- Edited by: Gwon Gi-suk
- Music by: Roh Young-sim; Jung Jae-il
- Production company: Cinema Service
- Distributed by: CJ Entertainment
- Release date: 12 December 2007
- Running time: 102 minutes
- Country: South Korea
- Language: Korean

Venus and Mars (Korean: 싸움; RR: Ssaum; lit. 'Fight') is a 2007 South Korean romantic comedy film directed by Han Ji-seung. It stars Sul Kyung-gu and Kim Tae-hee.

== Plot ==
Despite having little in common, Sang-min and Jin-ah fall in love and get married. Before long they come to realise that they actually can't stand each other, but the resulting split is far from amicable. Things come to a head when Jin-ah refuses to return the pendulum from Sang-min's beloved clock, and their petty squabbles degenerate into life-threatening violence.

== Cast ==
- Sul Kyung-gu as Kim Sang-min
- Kim Tae-hee as Yoon Jin-ah
- Seo Tae-hwa as Tae-hwa
- Jeon Soo-kyeong as Hyang-mi
- Kang Hye-ryeon as Jin-sook
- Kim Tae-wan as In-cheol
- Kim Do-yeon as Ha-na
- Im Ha-ryong as Divorce lawyer

== Release ==
Venus and Mars was released in South Korea on 12 December 2007, and on its opening weekend was ranked fourth at the box office with 164,750 admissions. The film went on to receive a total of 382,422 admissions nationwide, and as of 27 January 2008 had grossed a total of $2,316,750.
