= Kwak Jae-yong =

South Korean film director (born 1959)

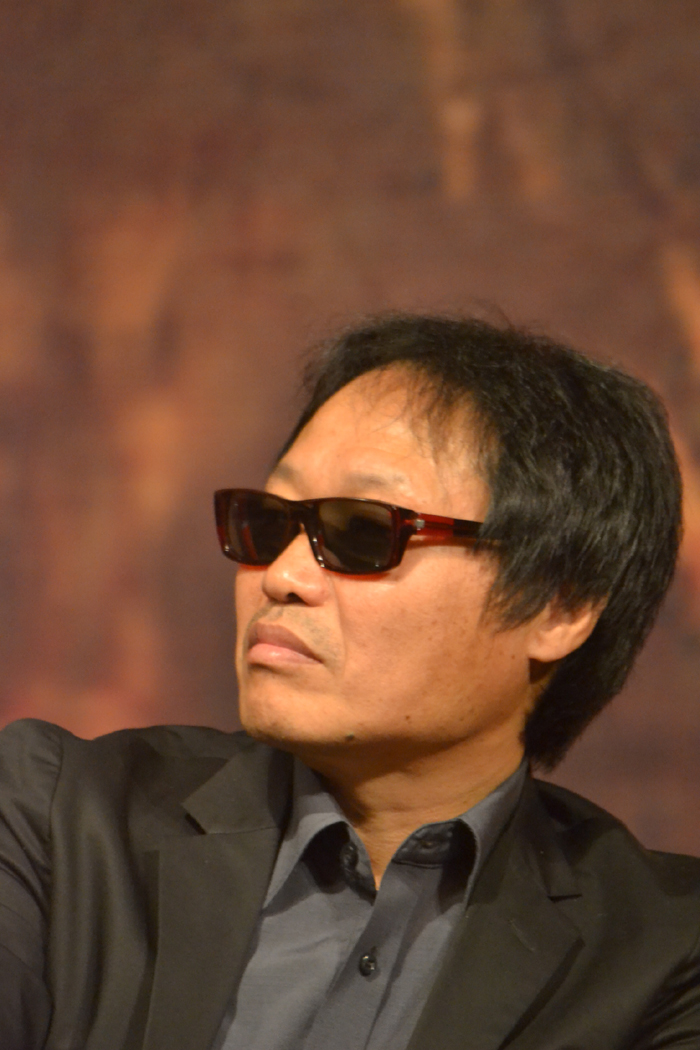
- Born: 22 May 1959 (age 67)
- Education: Kyung Hee University
- Occupations: Film director, screenwriter

Korean name
- Hangul: 곽재용
- Hanja: 郭在容
- RR: Gwak Jaeyong
- MR: Kwak Chaeyong

Kwak Jae-yong (born 22 May 1959) is a South Korean film director and screenwriter. He studied physics at Kyung Hee University. He achieved success with his debut film Watercolor Painting in a Rainy Day in 1989, but the failure of his next two movies led to eight years of unemployment before a comeback with the smash-hit film My Sassy Girl in 2001. He is known for his fondness of love stories set in a mix of different genres.

== Filmography ==
Year	Title	Director	Writer	Notes
1989	Watercolor Painting in a Rainy Day	Yes	Yes	
1992	Autumn Trip	Yes	Yes	
1993	Watercolor Painting in a Rainy Day 2	Yes	Yes	
2001	My Sassy Girl	Yes	Yes	
2002	The Romantic President	No	Yes	
2003	The Classic	Yes	Yes	
2004	Windstruck	Yes	Yes	
2004	Ark	No	Story	
2005	My Girl and I	No	Yes	
2006	Daisy	No	Yes	
2008	My Mighty Princess	Yes	Yes	
2008	Cyborg She	Yes	Yes	Japanese film
2008	All About Women	No	Yes	Cameo appearance
2014	Meet Miss Anxiety	Yes	No	Chinese film
2016	Crying Out in Love	Yes	Yes	Chinese film
2016	Time Renegades	Yes	No	
2017	Colours of Wind	Yes	Yes	Japanese film
2021	A Year-End Medley	Yes	No	

== Awards ==
Year	Event	Award	Work	Result	Ref.
2002	Grand Bell Awards	Best Adapted Screenplay –	My Sassy Girl	Won	
2003	Hong Kong Film Awards	Best Asian Film	My Sassy Girl	Won	
2003	Hochi Film Awards	Best Foreign Language Film	My Sassy Girl	Won	
2003	Fant-Asia Film Festival	Most Popular Film	My Sassy Girl	Won	
2004	Awards of the Japanese Academy	Best Foreign Film	My Sassy Girl	Nominated	
