= My Sassy Girl =

2001 South Korean film directed by Kwak Jae-yong

- Theatrical release poster
- Hangul: 엽기적인 그녀
- Hanja: 獵奇的인 그女
- RR: Yeopgijeogin geunyeo
- MR: Yŏpkijŏgin kŭnyŏ
- Directed by: Kwak Jae-yong
- Written by: Kim Ho-sik; Kwak Jae-yong
- Produced by: Shin Chul
- Starring: Jun Ji-hyun; Cha Tae-hyun
- Cinematography: Kim Sung-bok
- Edited by: Kim Sang-bum
- Music by: Kim Hyeong-seok
- Production companies: ShinCine Communications; IM Pictures
- Distributed by: Cinema Service
- Release date: July 27, 2001
- Running time: 123 minutes (theatrical cut); 137 minutes (director's cut)
- Country: South Korea
- Language: Korean
- Box office: $36.3 million

My Sassy Girl (Korean: 엽기적인 그녀; RR: Yeopgijeogin geunyeo; lit. 'That Bizarre Girl') is a 2001 South Korean romantic comedy film directed by Kwak Jae-yong, starring Jun Ji-hyun and Cha Tae-hyun. The film is based on a true story told in a series of blog posts written by Kim Ho-sik, who later adapted them into a novel.

The film was very successful in South Korea, where it was the highest-grossing comedy of all time, and one of the top five highest-grossing films ever at the time. When My Sassy Girl was released across East Asia, it became a blockbuster in the region, becoming a hit in Japan, Taiwan and Hong Kong. The film's success in Asia drew comparisons to Titanic. Its DVD release also drew a large international cult following, particularly in China, Southeast Asia, and parts of South Asia. My Sassy Girl sparked an international breakthrough for Korean cinema, and it played a key role in the spread of the Korean Wave.

The film has spawned an international media franchise, consisting of film remakes and television adaptations in different countries as well as a sequel. An American remake, starring Jesse Bradford and Elisha Cuthbert, and directed by Yann Samuell, was released in 2008. A Japanese drama adaptation with Tsuyoshi Kusanagi and actress Rena Tanaka as the leads started broadcasting in April 2008. A sequel, My New Sassy Girl, a collaborative work between Korea and China, was released in 2016. My Sassy Girl has received numerous remakes and adaptations, including Japanese and Korean television adaptations as well as a number of remakes from other countries (American, Indian, Chinese, Nepali, Lithuanian, Indonesian and Philippine versions).

== Background ==
The film was based on purportedly true stories written in first-person perspective and posted in an online forum by a South Korean student.

== Plot ==
Engineering student Gyeon-Woo struggles to get a date due to his shy and feminine behavior. His mother arranges for him to meet with his aunt and a potential date. While on the train, he meets a drunk Girl whom he carries to a nearby hotel for her to spend the night. The Girl calls Gyeon-Woo the next day to meet up near the train station where she discloses that she had recently broken up with her boyfriend before passing out drunk again. The two spend more time together to improve the Girl’s mood despite her brash character and her habit of placing Gyeon-Woo in humiliating scenarios. For her birthday, Gyeon-Woo brings the Girl to an amusement park at night but they are taken hostage by a heartbroken AWOL soldier. They take turns convincing the soldier to free the other and to surrender himself. Although the date fails, the Girl becomes friendlier towards Gyeon-Woo.

The Girl later introduces Gyeon-Woo to her parents who disapprove of their relationship. An argument erupts between the Girl and her family, causing Gyeon-Woo to distance himself from her. But on their hundredth day together, the Girl invites him to celebrate at her all-girls college. They spend that evening bar hopping until the Girl passes out drunk for the third time. Upon bringing her home, Gyeon-Woo is confronted once again by the Girl’s parents who investigate his pockets; Gyeon-Woo reveals a condom and the Girl’s father prohibits the two from seeing each other.

The pair meet up two more times. First, at the Girl’s blind date where Gyeon-Woo gives her date some advice based on their shared experiences before leaving while she went to the bathroom. This prompts the Girl to track down Gyeon-Woo at the train station where they reunite a second time. Despite the reunion, the Girl decides that they must part ways. They create a time capsule and bury it under a tree on a mountain with the promise to meet again after two years.

After two years pass, Gyeon-Woo travels to the tree but does not see the Girl. He revisits day after day before eventually opening the time capsule without her. Inside, he finds a letter from the Girl revealing that Gyeon-Woo closely resembles her boyfriend who had actually died before they met. She asks for more time to grieve and Gyeon-Woo reburies the capsule with his own letter. Another year passes and the Girl finally returns to the tree. She unearths the capsule containing Gyeon-Woo’s letter and tries to contact him to no avail. One day, the Girl has lunch with her late boyfriend’s mother with whom she remained close. The mother’s nephew then arrives and is revealed to be Gyeon-Woo: his aunt had arranged for the two to meet at the start of the film.

== Cast ==
- Jun Ji-hyun as The Girl
- Cha Tae-hyun as Gyeon-woo
- Kim In-moon as Gyeon-woo's father
- Song Ok-sook as Gyeon-woo's mother
- Han Jin-hee as The Girl's father
- Im Ho as the Blind Date Guy
- Yang Geum-seok as Gyeon-woo's aunt

== Release ==
My Sassy Girl was released in South Korea on July 27, 2001. In the Philippines, the film was released by Amuse Pictures with a Tagalog dub on October 26, 2005.

To celebrate 25th anniversary of the release of the film, a 4K restored version was showcased in the Korean Horizons section of the 25th New York Asian Film Festival on 18 July 2026 for its North American Premiere.

=== Box office ===
My Sassy Girl was the second highest-selling Korean film in 2001 (behind the film Friend), and at the time, it was the highest-grossing Korean comedy film of all time. 4,852,845 tickets were sold nationwide and 1,765,100 in Seoul over its 10 weeks in the cinemas. It grossed $26 million in the country, making it one of the top five highest-grossing films ever in South Korea, at the time. In Hong Kong, it topped the box office for two weeks and earned more than US$1.7 million. In Japan, it grossed $4.3 million from a limited release in 2003. The film also grossed $310,415 in Taiwan. In total, the film grossed $32,310,415 in East Asia.

=== Home media ===
The film's DVD release was an international success, drawing a large cult following in Asia and beyond. In Japan, for example, it was the best-selling Korean DVD in 2006. There were also a large number of pirated copies in circulation, particularly in Asia. The Blu-Ray release was in 2019.

== Critical reception ==
The film was acclaimed by critics. Koreanfilm.org praised Jun Ji-hyun's portrayal of the character, calling her the "undisputed star" and stating "it could not have succeeded anywhere near as well without her".

== Accolades ==
Event	Award
2001 Blue Dragon Film Awards	Best New Actor – Cha Tae-hyun; Nomination for Best Actress – Jun Ji-hyun
2002 Baeksang Arts Awards	Nomination for Best New Actor – Cha Tae-hyun
2002 Grand Bell Awards	Best Actress – Jun Ji-hyun; Best Adapted Screenplay – Kwak Jae-yong; Popularity Award – Jun Ji-hyun, Cha Tae-hyun; Nomination for Best Actor – Cha Tae-hyun
2002 Golden Cinematography Awards	Best New Actor – Cha Tae-hyun
2003 Hong Kong Film Awards	Best Asian Film
2003 Hochi Film Awards	Best Foreign Language Film
2003 Fant-Asia Film Festival	Most Popular Film
2004 Awards of the Japanese Academy	Nomination for Best Foreign Film

== Soundtrack ==
The soundtrack album for My Sassy Girl features a variation on Pachelbel's Canon in D) and a soundtrack of twenty-one pieces. The Korean song entitled "I Believe" by Shin Seung Hun (신승훈) is the theme song of this film. The song has been translated to different Asian languages such as Japanese, Chinese and Filipino.

My Sassy Girl Original Soundtrack

Soundtrack album
- Released: August 1, 2001
- Genre: Soundtrack
- Label: LS Media

My Sassy Girl OST track listing
No.	Title	Artist	Length
1.	"Intro"		0:27
2.	"I Believe"	Shin Seung Hun	4:41
3.	"Love & Longing"		3:00
4.	"Episode 1"		2:02
5.	"비내리는 밤 (Rainy Night)"		4:04
6.	"Hands Of Time"	Masaki Ueda	3:56
7.	"Episode 2 (Bip Bop)"		1:32
8.	"이별준비 (A Stars Preparation)"	Kim Jo Han	4:14
9.	"Big Money"	엑스틴, 빅 머니	4:14
10.	"겨울 나그네 (Winter Traveller)"		2:36
11.	"Episode 3 (그녀의 생일 Her Birthday)"		0:54
12.	"자장가 (Lullaby)"		3:13
13.	"사랑느낌 (Love Impression)"	Cho Kyu Chan	3:47
14.	"Another Life (Intro)"		0:47
15.	"Another Life"	Deen	4:02
16.	"Behind Of You (Instrumental)"		4:53
17.	"Episode 4 (Reg Time)"		0:56
18.	"Lost Memory"		2:37
19.	"같은 맘으로 (It's the Same)"		4:19
20.	"I Believe (With Piano)"		4:45
21.	"캐논변주곡 – 영화 속 전지현 연주곡 (Korean: Canon Variations – Performance in the film by Jun Ji-hyun)"	Jun Ji-hyun	4:27

=== Alternate versions ===
There are two scenes within the movie that have different soundtracks from each varying version, notably the EDKO and Starmax distributions.

- During the scene where Gyeon-woo (as villain) fights the heroine in the Girl's second movie script, the soundtrack to Ashes of Time by Hong Kong filmmaker Wong Kar Wai can be heard, whereas in the Hong Kong-EDKO release the score has been replaced with a Korean track.
- During the scene where Gyeon-woo exchanges shoes with the Girl, the song "My Girl" by The Temptations can be heard, whereas in the EDKO release the scene has been rescored with a Korean pop-track.

== Remakes and adaptations ==
=== Television dramas ===
Tsuyoshi Kusanagi and actress Rena Tanaka are the lead characters in the Japanese drama of the same name which started broadcasting in April 2008.

A South Korean historical time period drama remake titled My Sassy Girl, starring Joo Won and Oh Yeon-seo, airing this 2017 on SBS.

In Thailand, it was remake as a Thai TV series titled My Sassy Girl started airing on October 11, 2021, on True Asian More starred by Jarinya Sirimongkolsakul and Nutthasit Kotimanuswanich.

=== American film ===
This American remake of the film is set in New York City's Central Park and Upper East Side. Director Yann Samuell states "It's a fable about destiny, in the end." whilst Jesse Bradford who plays the lead protagonist summarized the movie as "a romantic comedy about how they pull each other to a more healthy place by virtue of their relationship."

=== Indian films ===
An uncredited Bollywood version called Ugly Aur Pagli starring Ranvir Shorey and Mallika Sherawat was released on August 1, 2008. The movie is directed by Sachin Khot.

A Telugu remake of the film was made starring Bharat and Videesha. It was titled Maa Iddhari Madhya.

A Malayalam remake titled White was also made starring Mammootty and Huma Qureshi (in double role) with some changes. While another Malayalam movie Vinodayathra was reported to have scenes inspired from this movie.

=== Chinese film ===
A Chinese version named My Sassy Girl 2 (我的野蠻女友2) directed by Joe Ma stars Lynn Hung and Leon Jay Williams was released in 2010.

=== Nepali film ===
A Nepali version titled Sano Sansar was released on 12 September 2008 and became very popular amongst teenagers in the country.

=== Lithuanian film ===
A Lithuanian version titled Moterys meluoja geriau: Robertėlis was released on 3 August 2018. It was based on the characters form a popular local TV drama.

=== Philippine film ===
A Filipino version of My Sassy Girl was announced in 2021, to be starred by Toni Gonzaga and Pepe Herrera. Filming and production completed in the same year. The film will be released on 31 January 2024.

=== Indonesian film ===
An Indonesian version directed by Fajar Bustomi, and starring Tiara Andini and Jefri Nichol. This version was released on June 23, 2022.

== Sequel and references ==
Cha Tae-hyun starred in the direct sequel, My New Sassy Girl, which was released in China on April 22, 2016, and South Korea on May 5 as a South Korean-Chinese co-production. The movie was not as well-received as its original.

Cha Tae-hyun has made cameo appearances in Jun Ji-hyun's film Windstruck (whose ending scene at the train station is very similar to that of My Sassy Girl) and TV series The Legend of the Blue Sea (Episode 4, where he makes reference to Jun's character's history as "sassy"). A poster of My Sassy Girl appears in My Love from the Star (Episode 5) as one of the previous hit films by Jun's character.

== See also ==
- Train Man
