= Song Ji-na =

South Korean screenwriter (born 1959)

- Born: September 12, 1959 (age 67); Seoul, South Korea
- Education: Ewha Womans University - Journalism & Mass Communication
- Occupation: Screenwriter
- Years active: 1982-present
- Organization: Korea Television and Radio Writers Association (KTRWA)
- Agent: Kim Jong-hak Production
- Spouse: Jin Ki-woong
- Children: Jin Han-sae

Korean name
- Hangul: 송지나
- Hanja: 宋智娜
- RR: Song Jina
- MR: Song China
- Website: http://www.dramada.com/

Song Ji-na (born September 12, 1959) is a South Korean screenwriter. She is best known for writing Eyes of Dawn (1991) and Sandglass (1995), two of the most influential and highly rated Korean dramas of all time.

== Career ==
=== 1980s: Early works ===
Song Ji-na began her career as a writer for the radio program Starry Night on MBC Radio. She made her television writing debut in 1982 on the children's show Tiger Teacher, while writing the scripts of a social documentary TV series.

She then met TV director Kim Jong-hak, with whom she would famously collaborate on eight television dramas. Their first work together was The Last Station (1987), one of MBC's early experiments with the miniseries format. Adapted from a manhwa by Huh Young-man, the eight-episode series was set in the 1970s and starred Jung Dong-hwan and Kang Moon-young. Song and Kim's second drama was Teacher, Teacher, Our Teacher (1988).

Their third collaboration, Human Market (1988) was based on Kim Hong-shin's bestselling novel and became one of the classics of 1980s Korean television (SBS would later remake it in 2004).

=== 1990s: Eyes of Dawn and Sandglass ===
To celebrate MBC's 30th anniversary, Song and Kim adapted Kim Seong-jong's 10-volume novel (published in 1981), embarking on a drama that would make Korean television history. Eyes of Dawn began filming in advance in June 1990, with overseas shoots in the Philippines and Harbin (despite the fact that Korea and China hadn't yet established diplomatic relations), a budget of ₩7.2 billion (five- to ten-times the cost of an average drama at the time), over 270 actors and 21,000 extras. Starring Choi Jae-sung, Park Sang-won and Chae Shi-ra, the series spanned Korea's painful modern history from the Japanese colonial period to the Korean War. When it aired from 1991 to 1992, it reached a peak viewership rating of 58.4%.

In 1992, Song and Kim co-founded the production company Jcom (predecessor to Kim Jong-hak Production, which was founded by Kim in 1999). Three years later, they moved to then-newly launched broadcasting station SBS, and their next drama would be equally popular and critically acclaimed. Set during the politically tumultuous period of 1970s through 1980s Korea (including a reenactment of the Gwangju Massacre interspersed with archival video footage), Sandglass (1995) recorded a peak rating of 64.5%, the third highest of all time, and launched Choi Min-soo, Go Hyun-jung, Park Sang-won and Lee Jung-jae into stardom.

Eyes of Dawn and Sandglass were so phenomenally popular that while they were airing, streets were reportedly deserted because people were in their homes watching. Critics and viewers praised the dramas' outstanding production values (editing, cinematography, acting, writing), and for their realistic portrayal of individual lives amidst dark political times. They are currently still considered iconic masterpieces of Korean TV. Though Song and Kim would collaborate again, their subsequent series would not reach the same heights of success.

=== 1997 to 2003 ===
Song was also the screenwriter for two films -- 3pm Paradise (1997) directed by Kwak Kyung-taek, and the melodrama Love (1999) starring Jung Woo-sung and Ko So-young.

Later that year, she returned to television and co-wrote Love Story, a 16-episode anthology drama that aired from December 1999 to January 2000 featuring eight different stories with two episodes per story. Among its star-studded cast were Lee Byung-hun, Lee Seung-yeon, Kim Sun-a, Choi Ji-woo, Song Seung-heon, Cha Seung-won, Lee Na-young, Lee Beom-soo, Song Yun-ah, Yoo Ji-tae, Lee Mi-yeon, Lee Geung-young, Bae Doona, So Ji-sub, Kim Hyun-joo, and Kim Tae-woo.

Her 2002 Joseon period drama Daemang (also known as Great Ambition) was again directed by Kim Jong-hak and starred Jang Hyuk and Lee Yo-won.

This was followed in 2003 by Rosemary, which featured Yoo Ho-jeong, Kim Seung-woo, Bae Doona and Yeon Jung-hoon in a story about a terminally ill wife.

=== 2007: The Legend ===
Song then moved to New Zealand and went on hiatus for four years. She made her comeback in 2007 with another Kim Jong-hak project, the big-budget historical-fantasy-epic The Legend (also known as Taewangsasingi, or "The Four Guardian Gods of the King"). Highly anticipated for being Korean Wave superstar Bae Yong-joon's first TV series in five years, the series also starred Lee Ji-ah, Moon So-ri, Choi Min-soo, Park Sang-won and Lee Phillip. But despite excellent ratings (its peak was 35.7%) and solid overseas sales, The Legend wasn't able to recoup its huge ₩60 billion budget, so it became (in terms of profit) the biggest flop in Korean drama history.

=== 2009: The Slingshot ===
Her 2009 action thriller Story of a Man (also known as The Slingshot) starred Park Yong-ha, Kim Kang-woo and Park Si-yeon, and focused on a man forming a "dream team" to face off against a sociopathic businessman and the money-driven world he represents. Despite low ratings in the single digits (it shared the same timeslot as hit period drama Queen Seondeok), The Slingshot won Best Drama Series at the 2009 Seoul International Drama Awards.

=== 2011: What's Up ===
For her next project, Song returned to the genre of campus drama; she had previously written KAIST in 1999, about students attending the titular premier science university, and the series boosted the careers of young stars such as Chae Rim. In What's Up, an ensemble cast composed of Im Joo-hwan, Daesung, Lim Ju-eun, Oh Man-seok, Jang Hee-jin, Kim Ji-won, Lee Soo-hyuk and Jo Jung-suk portray students and teachers of a university's musical theatre department. Song was highly involved in the production process, including the open auditions for the supporting roles through micro-blogging service me2day. The drama was filmed in its entirety in 2010, but later encountered problems finding a timeslot among the three major broadcast networks. It eventually aired a year later on cable channel MBN.

=== 2012: Faith ===
Faith (also known as The Great Doctor, 2012) was Song's eighth and last collaboration with Kim Jong-hak. A fantasy epic about a 21st-century plastic surgeon who time travels to the Goryeo era and falls for royal bodyguard Choe Yeong, the series initially cast Lee Joon-gi and Kim Hee-sun as the protagonists. But Lee was drafted for mandatory military service, and he was replaced by Kang Ji-hwan, who then became embroiled in a legal dispute with his agency, and the role eventually went to Lee Min-ho. Over three years of stalled pre-production, the story itself underwent major changes, becoming less dark and less fantastical. Given its ₩13 billion budget and low ratings (around the 10% range), Faith was considered a financial failure. Members of the cast and crew later sued Kim Jong-hak for unpaid wages, and while being investigated for fraud and embezzlement, he committed suicide in July 2013. Song wrote in her blog about seeing the various actors who'd previously starred in Kim's past series at the director's wake, saying, "It was like a scene from a dream. Perhaps he wanted us all to come together like this and dine... Was that it?"

=== 2014: Healer ===
In 2014, Song cast Ji Chang-wook as the titular character in Healer, about a not-so-ordinary errand guy who becomes embroiled in a decades-long mystery involving two reporters (played by Park Min-young and Yoo Ji-tae). Despite lackluster ratings, Healer drew a cult following among domestic and international viewers.

=== 2017: The King in Love ===
In 2017, Song took the lead as the main writer for another drama, The King in Love. Set in the Goryeo dynasty, it tells the story of a young and ambitious crown prince, Won (Im Si-wan), and two people who shape his destiny: his childhood friend Rin (Hong Jong-hyun) and a beautiful woman named San (Im Yoon-ah).

=== Later years ===
Song was supposed to be the writer for the then-developed MBC series Gaia, but was replaced later by Kim Ban-di. The project was eventually retitled as Missing 9.

== Personal life ==
Song is married to Jin Ki-woong, a director for KBS1's long-running investigative news program In Depth 60 Minutes. They have a son, Jin Han-sae (Gin Han-sai), who is also a drama screenwriter. Jin Han-sae is the writer of the 2020 Netflix original Extracurricular and the 2017 Naver web series Irish Uppercut.

== Filmography ==
=== Television ===
- Tiger Teacher (MBC, 1982)
- The Last Station (MBC, 1987)
- Human Market (MBC, 1988)
- Teacher, Teacher, Our Teacher (MBC, 1988)
- Senoya (KBS2, 1989)
- Eyes of Dawn (MBC, 1991–1992)
- Sandglass (SBS, 1995)
- Snail (1997)
- KAIST (SBS, 1999–2000)
- Love Story (SBS, 1999–2000)
- Great Ambition (SBS, 2002–2003)
- Rosemary (KBS2, 2003)
- The Legend (MBC, 2007)
- The Slingshot (KBS2, 2009)
- What's Up? (MBN, 2011)
- Faith (SBS, 2012)
- Healer (KBS2, 2014–2015)
- The King in Love (MBC, 2017)

=== Film ===
- 3pm Paradise (1997)
- Love (1999)

== Awards ==
- 2000 1st Korea Science and Culture Award

Year	Award	Category	Recipient	Result
1995	31st Baeksang Arts Awards	Daesang (Grand Prize)	Sandglass	Won
1995	31st Baeksang Arts Awards	Best Drama	Sandglass	Won
1995	31st Baeksang Arts Awards	Best Screenplay (TV)	Sandglass	Won
1995	22nd Korean Broadcasting Awards	Best Drama	Sandglass	Won
1995	22nd Korean Broadcasting Awards	Best Writer	Sandglass	Won
1996	8th Producers Association Award	Daesang (Grand Prize)	Sandglass	Won
1996	8th Producers Association Award	Best Drama	Sandglass	Won
1996	2nd Korean TV and Radio Writers Association:	Best Writer	Sandglass	Won
