= Kim Jong-hak =

South Korean television director and producer (1951–2013)

- Born: November 5, 1951; Jecheon, North Chungcheong Province, South Korea
- Died: July 23, 2013 (aged 61); Bundang-gu, Gyeonggi Province, South Korea
- Cause of death: Suicide by carbon monoxide poisoning
- Education: Kyung Hee University - Journalism
- Occupations: Television director, Television producer, Film producer
- Years active: 1981-2013

Korean name
- Hangul: 김종학
- Hanja: 金鍾學
- RR: Gim Jonghak
- MR: Kim Chonghak

Kim Jong-hak (November 5, 1951 – July 23, 2013) was a South Korean television director and producer, best known for the seminal and highly rated Korean dramas Eyes of Dawn (1991) and Sandglass (1995). After financial losses incurred by the big-budget fantasy series The Legend (2007) and Faith (2012), Kim was under investigation when he committed suicide in 2013.

== Career ==
=== Beginnings ===
Kim Jong-hak was born on November 5, 1951, in Jecheon, North Chungcheong Province, the fourth son of seven siblings. While attending Whimoon High School, he won an Excellence Award at the National High School Theater Competition in 1966.

=== MBC training ===
After he graduated from Kyung Hee University with a Journalism degree, he joined the broadcasting network MBC in 1977. This was a period when the South Korean television industry was undergoing a creative transition with the launch of color broadcasts and ENG cameras, and the new format of short dramas adapted from famous novels, MBC's Bestseller Theater (베스트셀러극장). Like most newbie production directors (called by the title "PD" in Korea), Kim slowly climbed up the ranks by assisting veterans, getting the occasional producer credit on Chief Inspector (수사반장), the 1981 landmark police procedural starring Choi Bool-am.

=== Early works ===
Kim became an assistant director on one of the historical dramas (called sageuk in Korean) of his mentor Lee Byung-hoon, Royal Emissary (암행어사). In the following years, Kim would direct in all sorts of genres and formats, building versatility that would come in handy about a decade later.

In 1983, he told the story of legendary pansori pioneer Shin Chae-hyo in 1983's The Jester (광대가) by Lee Eun-seong, one of the many three-episode experiments that would eventually lead to the birth of miniseries in 1987; he again worked with Lee the same year in the short Gosanja Kim Jeong-ho (고산자 김정호, 1983), a biopic of the notorious late Joseon cartographer, and then moved on to Dasan Jeong Yak-yong (다산 정약용, 1983), written by another sageuk pioneer, Im Choong; he was even entrusted the June 25 special (commemorating the Korean War) which adapted Jo Jung-rae's The Gates of Men (인간의 문) for the small screen, a tale of a left-wing partisan's guilt 20 years after his war crimes.

It would take him until 1986 to debut as a bonafide director for an entire series, by taking over for Lee Byung-hoon in MBC's sageuk franchise 500 Years of Joseon (조선왕조 500년), of which Kim directed The Hoechun Gate (회천문; he shared co-directing credits with Lee) and Namhan Fortress (남한산성). But 1987 and 1988 were the years that cemented him as one of Yeouido's most important young directors, not only because of his style and versatility but also his eclectic choices. He helmed the first of many Kim Seong-jong adaptations with Beautiful Affair (아름다운 밀회), about the power struggle that ensues after the death of a powerful company chairman.

=== Collaboration with Song Ji-na ===
That same year he met Song Ji-na, a former radio drama scripter, and they would famously collaborate on eight dramas. Their first work together was The Last Station (퇴역전선), an eight-episode miniseries (one of the first of the format) set in the 1970s and adapted from a Huh Young-man manhwa, followed by their second series Teacher, Teacher, Our Teacher (선생님 선생님 우리 선생님). But their partnership blossomed with Human Market (인간시장), adapted from Kim Hong-shin's bestseller and which became one of the classics of 1980s Korean TV (SBS would later remake it in 2004). Among the cast of Human Market was actor Park Sang-won, who would continue to work with Kim and Song through the years.

==== Eyes of Dawn ====
But Kim's true breakthrough came with Eyes of Dawn. To celebrate MBC's 30th anniversary, Song and Kim adapted Kim Seong-jong's 10-volume novel (published in 1981), embarking on a drama that would make Korean television history. Eyes of Dawn began filming in advance in June 1990, with overseas shoots in the Philippines and Harbin (despite the fact that Korea and China hadn't yet established diplomatic relations), a budget of ₩7.2 billion (five- to ten-times the cost of an average drama at the time), over 270 actors and 21,000 extras. Starring Choi Jae-sung, Park Sang-won and Chae Shi-ra, the series depicted young Koreans caught in the maelstrom of turbulent history, from World War II, to the Japanese colonial period and the Korean War. When it aired from 1991 to 1992, it reached a peak viewership rating of 58.4%.

==== Sandglass ====
1991 was also the year SBS was launched, forming the three major Korean networks still existing in the present. The new station catalyzed fierce competition towards quantity and quality, and SBS began scouting writers and PDs from its rival stations. Kim had left MBC in 1992 and become a freelance producer, with his production shingle (which he co-founded with Song Ji-na) initially called Jcom. In 1995, he and Song moved to SBS to make Sandglass, which revolved around the tragic relationship between three friends affected by the political and civilian oppression of the 1970s and 80s. Sandglass was controversial because it doubled as a commentary on painful moments of Korea's contemporary history, such as the 1980 Gwangju Massacre (interspersed with its reenactment was archival video footage). It also became one of the most-watched dramas in the country's history, and the streets of Seoul were reportedly deserted whenever it aired. With average ratings of 50.8% and a peak rating at 64.5% (the third highest of all time), Sandglass made Choi Min-soo, Go Hyun-jung, Park Sang-won and Lee Jung-jae A-list stars, and Kim into one of the most influential figures in Korean television.

Eyes of Dawn and Sandglass were the peak of the Kim-Song collaboration, and their succeeding dramas, both with each other and with other collaborators, would not reach the same heights of critical and commercial success.

=== 1996 to 2002 ===
From 1996 to 1997, Kim took a break from the small screen and produced four films, including Push! Push! starring Hwang Shin-hye and Bang Eun-jin.

He returned to television in 1998, directing the action drama White Nights 3.98 which starred Choi Min-soo, Lee Byung-hun and Shim Eun-ha. Adapted by screenwriter Kang Eun-kyung from a novel by Han Tae-hoon, White Nights 3.98 was not as successful in the ratings as Kim's previous series.

In 1999, Kim renamed his company Kim Jong-hak Production. (As of 2018, the company is now a subsidiary of ESA Co., Ltd.)

He collaborated with Song Ji-na for the sixth time in 2002's Great Ambition (대망, Daemang), a period drama starring Jang Hyuk, Lee Yo-won, Han Jae-suk and Son Ye-jin.

=== Fantasy epics ===
==== The Legend ====
His next project with Song took five years of planning. The 2007 historical-fantasy-epic The Legend (also known as Taewangsasingi, or "The Four Guardian Gods of the King") was highly anticipated for being Korean Wave superstar Bae Yong-joon's first TV series in five years, and also starred Lee Ji-ah, Moon So-ri, Choi Min-soo, Park Sang-won and Lee Phillip. Despite excellent ratings (its peak was 35.7%) as well as positive reception from overseas viewers, the high production costs left Kim in debt.

==== Faith ====
Kim's last drama was Faith (also known as The Great Doctor), his eighth and last collaboration with Song Ji-na. A fantasy epic about a 21st-century plastic surgeon who time travels to the Goryeo era and falls for royal bodyguard Choi Young, the series initially cast Lee Joon-gi and Kim Hee-sun as the protagonists. But Lee was drafted for mandatory military service, and he was replaced by Kang Ji-hwan, who then became embroiled in a legal dispute with his agency, and the role eventually went to Lee Min-ho. The casting changes stalled production for three years, and budget constraints forced Kim to modify his original plan to shoot in 3D. Given its ₩13 billion budget and low ratings (around the 10% range), Faith was considered the biggest television flop of 2012.

Kim, who hadn't recovered from the financial setbacks of The Legend, became mired in even greater debt. This resulted in him being ousted from Kim Jong-hak Productions, though the company retained his name under new leadership.

Several months after the drama ended, members of the Faith cast and crew filed a lawsuit in February 2013 against Kim over unpaid wages amounting to ₩640 million (US$572,800), under the charge that he had misappropriated ₩7 billion for personal use. Furthermore, Kim was accused of double-contracting Faith's soundtrack rights to two separate companies.

In May 2013, Kim was placed under investigation for fraud, embezzlement and professional negligence. In China at the time filming a Chinese television drama, Kim was summoned back home on account of the lawsuit, then issued an overseas travel ban. Devastated, he told his friends that his own life appeared to have become a soap opera. He continued to deny any allegations of wrongdoing.

== Death ==
On July 23, 2013, the 61-year-old director was found dead in a small rented room in Bundang-gu, Gyeonggi Province. The cheap goshitel room (costing ₩15,000) had been recommended to him by a longtime confidant, his barber, as a refuge before a questioning session at the prosecutor's office scheduled that day.

In an apparent charcoal-burning suicide by asphyxiation, police officials said Kim had duct taped the doorways and windows, and half-burned charcoal briquettes were found near his body. There were no signs of forced entry, Kim's body didn't have any external injuries, and he left behind a four-page suicide note apologizing to his family and criticizing the prosecutors, one of them he identified with the surname "Kim".

Kim Jong-hak said on his suicide note about his prosecution,

Prosecutor Kim (first name withheld), I am in a rage about your ambitions, about your conspiracies with album industries. I hope you apologize to those citizens who love dramas.... You make what has been built across a long time a mere sand castle, and you say you are the hand of justice? Ghosts lament your words. You should be the one to be prosecuted. You′ve been forcing a conclusion, and then what? I have been framed.

— Translation of some parts of Kim Jong-hak's suicide note, translated by the article writer, Police Reveal That Producer Kim Jong Hak Criticized Prosecution in His Suicide Note, Mwave enewsworld, 25 July 2013, Lee Jin-Ho (original writer), Erika Kim (translator)

=== Reactions ===
The Korea Broadcasting Actors Union called Kim as both "a perpetrator and a victim of a flawed outsourced production system" in a statement, wherein it stated that “such tragedies will continue unless the outsourcing system that benefits only the broadcasters is eradicated.”

Writer Song Ji-na, a long-time collaborator of Kim, revealed that Faith lead actress Kim Hee-sun was approached by staff and rookie actors of the series for help in filing the lawsuits against the drama's production company, and that she and the other cast felt guilty upon Kim Jong-hak's death.

== Legacy ==
Despite his legal troubles late in life, Kim's legacy remains his work. Kim Seung-soo at the Seoul Institute of the Arts praised his eye for detail, saying, "He was a true master of his craft who insisted on perfection, and this passion had run into a brick wall." Kim revolutionized Korean dramas and changed the visual paradigm of the industry, which heralded a Golden Age that would last nearly a decade. Both critically acclaimed and massively popular, Eyes of Dawn and Sandglass are currently considered iconic masterpieces of Korean television.

== Filmography ==
=== As TV Director ===
- Faith (SBS, 2012)†
- The Legend (MBC, 2007)†
- Great Ambition (SBS, 2002)†
- White Nights 3.98 (SBS, 1998)
- Sandglass (SBS, 1995)†
- Eyes of Dawn (MBC, 1991-1992)†
- Fifth Column (MBC, 1989)
- To the Emperor (MBC, 1989)
- Human Market (MBC, 1988)†
- Our Town (MBC, 1988)
- Teacher, Teacher, Our Teacher (MBC, 1988)†
- The Last Station (MBC, 1987)†
- Beautiful Affair (MBC, 1987)
- Namhan Fortress (MBC, 1986)
- The Hoechun Gate (MBC, 1986)
- 북으로 간 여배우 (MBC, 1986)
- The Age of Heroes (MBC, 1985)
- Seven Roses (MBC, 1984)
- Kingdom of Dongto (MBC, 1984)
- Government-General of Joseon (MBC, 1984)
- The Gates of Men (MBC, 1984)
- Gosanja Kim Jeong-ho (MBC, 1983)
- Dasan Jeong Yak-yong (MBC, 1983)
- The Jester (MBC, 1983)
- Chief Inspector (MBC, 1981)

†denotes collaborations with screenwriter Song Ji-na.

=== As TV Producer ===
List of television series produced by Kim Jong-hak Production while Kim was CEO.
- Beethoven Virus (MBC, 2008)
- One Mom and Three Dads (KBS2, 2008)
- Insoon Is Pretty (KBS2, 2007)
- Yi San (MBC, 2007-2008)
- The Legend (MBC, 2007)
- H.I.T (MBC, 2007)
- Behind the White Tower (MBC, 2007)
- Dal-ja's Spring (KBS2, 2007)
- The Person I Love (SBS, 2007)
- The Vineyard Man (KBS2, 2006)
- Look Back With a Smile (KBS2, 2006)
- Which Star Are You From (MBC, 2006)
- Hello God (KBS2, 2006)
- Special of My Life (MBC, 2006)
- Ballad of Seodong (SBS, 2005-2006)
- Princess Lulu (SBS, 2005)
- Love Hymn (MBC, 2005)
- Fashion 70's (SBS, 2005)
- Sad Love Story (MBC, 2005)
- Emperor of the Sea (KBS2, 2004-2005)
- Oh Feel Young (KBS2, 2004)
- When a Man Loves a Woman (SBS, 2004)
- Full House (KBS2, 2004)
- Sunlight Pours Down (SBS, 2004)
- A Problem at My Younger Brother's House (SBS, 2003-2004)
- Rosemary (KBS2, 2003)
- Good Person (MBC, 2003)
- First Love (SBS, 2003)
- Shoot for the Stars (SBS, 2002-2003)
- Great Ambition (SBS, 2002)
- Glass Slippers (SBS, 2002)
- Present (MBC, 2002)
- Legend (MBC)
- Beautiful Days (SBS, 2001)
- Golden Era (MBC, 2000-2001)
- Ghost (SBS, 1999)
- White Nights 3.98 (SBS, 1998)

=== As Film Producer ===
- 3pm Paradise Bath House (1997)
- Push! Push! (1997)
- Barricade (1997)
- Insh'allah (1996)

== Awards ==
- 2003 Korean Producers and Directors' (PD) Association Awards: Best Drama (Great Ambition)
- 2003 CCEJ Viewers' Drama of the Year: Great Ambition
- 2003 Baeksang Arts Awards: Best TV Director (Great Ambition)
- 1995 Baeksang Arts Awards: Best TV Director, Best Drama, Grand Prize for TV (Sandglass)
- 1992 Korea Broadcasting Awards: Best Drama (Eyes of Dawn)
- 1992 Baeksang Arts Awards: Best TV Director, Best Drama, Grand Prize for TV (Eyes of Dawn)
- 1984 Korea Broadcasting Awards: Best Drama (Kingdom of Dongto), Best Director (The Gates of Men)
- 1984 Baeksang Arts Awards: Best TV Director (Kingdom of Dongto)
