= White Nights 3.98 =

1998 South Korean television series

- Hangul: 백야 3.98
- RR: Baegya 3.98
- MR: Paegya 3.98
- Genre: Action; Drama
- Based on: White Nights 3.98 by Han Tae-hoon
- Written by: Kang Eun-kyung
- Directed by: Kim Jong-hak
- Starring: Choi Min-soo; Shim Eun-ha; Lee Byung-hun; Lee Jung-jae; Jin Hee-kyung
- Country of origin: South Korea
- Original language: Korean
- No. of seasons: 1
- No. of episodes: 20

Production
- Production location: Korea
- Running time: Mondays and Tuesdays at 21:55 (KST)
- Production company: Seoul Broadcasting System

Original release
- Network: Seoul Broadcasting System
- Release: 31 August – 3 November 1998

White Nights 3.98 (Korean: 백야 3.98) is a 1998 South Korean television series based on the novel of the same title by Han Tae-hoon and directed by Kim Jong-hak. It aired on SBS from August 31 to November 3, 1998.

The series was criticized for director Kim Jong-hak's reliance on self-replication reminiscent of his earlier work Sandglass (1995), the actors' awkward Russian dialogue, computer graphics, and writing, resulting in low viewership ratings.

== Premise ==
After the collapse of Cold War ideology, in the rapidly shifting situation on the Korean Peninsula, Taek-hyeong and Gyeong-bin clash in pursuit of their nations' interests, while Anastasia finds love even in the most extreme circumstances.

== Cast ==
=== Main ===
- Choi Min-soo as Kwon Taek-hyeong, major in the Korean People's Army
  - Kim Jung-woo as young Taek-hyeong
  - Kim Min-sung as teenage Taek-hyeong
- Shim Eun-ha as Anastasia Jang
  - Kwon Hae-kwang as young Anastasia
  - Lee Eun-ju as teenage Anastasia
- Lee Byung-hun as Min Gyeong-bin, Korean Central Intelligence agent and former Air Force first lieutenant
  - Shin Joo-ho as young Gyeong-bin
  - Lee Jong-soo as teenage Gyeong-bin
- Lee Jung-jae as Lee Young-jun
- Jin Hee-kyung as Oh Seong-shim
- Wang Hee-ji as Hong Jung-yeon
  - Song Hye-kyo as teenage Jung-yeon
- Yoo Jun-sang as Kim Jin-seok, ANSP intelligence agent
  - Kim Jung-ho as teenage Jin-seok

=== Supporting ===
- Jung Hyung-ki as General Kwon Ki-wook, Taek-hyeong's father and member of Unit 124
- Kim Eun-sook as Ki-wook's wife
- Lee Seok as General Kwon Dong-wook, Ki-wook's brother
- Park Woong as Anatoly Jang, father of Anastasia, Soviet nuclear physicist, and deputy director of the Irkutsk Atomic Energy Institute
- Jo Kyung-hwan as Yuri Kim, Chechen mafia boss
- Shin Hyun-joon as Peter Kim, son of Yuri
- Im Hyeok-ju as Min Se-yoon, father of Gyeong-bin and captain of the Jongno Police Station
- Park Soon-cheon as Se-yoon's wife
- Kim Young-ae as Hong Young-sook, Agency for National Security Planning and Consul General to Russia, aunt of Jung-yeon
- Park Sang-won as Air Force major Choi Sang-gyu
- Kim Ye-ryeong as Sang-gyu's wife
- Park Eun-bin as Choi So-young, Sang-gyu's daughter
- Nam Sung-hoon as ANSP personnel
- Jo Hyung-ki as Park Seon-bae, ANSP agent sent to Russia
- Lee Seung-hyung as ANSP agent sent to Russia
- Lee Hee-do as ANSP agent sent to Kazakhstan
- Choi Jong-hwan as Major Lee Young-hu, Young-jun's older brother and commanding officer of Jang Baek-ho troop
- Nam Na-kyung as Yoon Sook-kyung, Young-hu's wife
- Kwak Jung-wook as Lee Min-ki, Young-hu's son
- Son Ho-gyun as Yasuda, Pyongyang gangster boss
- Yoon Yong-hyun as Yasuda's underling
- Kim Ki-beom as "Crocodile," Yasuda's underling
- Jung Ui-gap as "Crayfish," Yasuda's underling
- Kim Byung-ki as Oh Geuk-chul, father of Seong-shim and lieutenant general of the Korean People's Army
- Song Kwi-hyun as Geuk-chul's deputy
- Shim Yang-hong as Chairman of Wildcat crash investigation committee
- Jung Dong-hwan as Colonel Woo
- Lee Ki-young as Choi Deuk-gu, Jang Baek-ho troop
- Kim Se-jun as Oh Dae-gyu, army doctor of Jang Baek-ho troop
- Jung Woong-in as Baek Seung-je, signaller of Jang Baek-ho troop
- Jung Sung-mo as Kim Il-gu, former Air Force first lieutenant
