= Korea Television and Radio Writers Association =

South Korean Labor union

- Korea Television and Radio Writers Association (KTRWA)
- Founded: 1964
- Headquarters: 4th floor, Geumsan Building, 750 Gukhoe-daero, Yeongdeungpo-gu, Seoul
- Location: South Korea
- Chairman: Jeong Jae-hong
- Key people: Lee Seo-gu; Han Un-sa; Joo Tae-ik; Choi Yo-an
- Affiliations: The International Writers' Guild (IWG)
- Website: www.ktrwa.or.kr/web/user/main.do

Korean name
- Hangul: 한국방송작가협회
- Hanja: 韓國放送作家協會
- Lit.: Korea Broadcasting Writers Association
- RR: Hanguk bangsong jakga hyeophoe
- MR: Han'guk pangsong chakka hyŏphoe

The Korea Television and Radio Writers Association (KTRWA; Korean: 한국방송작가협회; lit. 'Korea Broadcasting Writers Association') is a labour union based in Seoul, South Korea. Members are screenwriter, playwrights, and journalists who work in radio, films, TV, and digital media. There are currently around 3,700 active members.

The Association is an autonomous body, for writers and run by writers of South Korea. Members of KTRWA can register their scripts, screenplays and lyrics with the organisation, and seek recourse in case of a dispute. KTRWA has a legal officer on board and the dispute settlement committee handles cases pertaining to writers' rights regarding credit and payments.

Chairman was selected every two years. In 2024, Jeong Jae-hong was elected as the 31st chairman of the Korea Broadcasting Writers Association.

== Purpose and function ==
KTRWA was established for the purpose of protecting the rights and interests of broadcasting writers, including copyrights, and contributing to the development of national culture through the improvement and development of broadcasting literature and exchanges.

== Organization ==
=== Structure ===
KTRWA's structure includes the chairman, vice-chairman, auditor, copyright director, executive director, education center director, secretary general, management support department, copyright department, and rights protection department. Prospective members must pass a review by the Membership Qualification Review Committee and meet specific criteria, such as having written a certain number of original plays or dramas. The association is located at 750 Gukhoe-daero, Yeongdeungpo-gu, Seoul.

=== Business ===
==== Copyright Trust Management and Royalties ====
The organization's main focus is managing the copyright trust of its members. This includes negotiating copyright use agreements with terrestrial broadcasters, cable TV companies, and general programming companies, adjusting manuscript fees, and ensuring the collection and distribution of copyright royalties to members. It safeguards writers' intellectual property rights by signing usage agreements with more than 100 broadcasting companies and overseeing copyright trust and royalty management. The organization annually negotiates salaries and remuneration systems for writers working with broadcasting companies.

==== Research, Publications and Awards ====
The organization publishes a monthly magazine called "Broadcast Writer". They also publish award-winning works from the Korean Broadcasting Writer Award each February, and an association diary and desktop calendar each December. Additionally, they established and award the "Korean Broadcast Writer Award" each December, recognizing excellence across 5 categories - drama, culture, entertainment, radio, and special awards.

==== Member Support and Welfare ====
A variety of welfare projects are provided for the organization's members. This includes supporting 5 research groups such as the Drama Research Association, offering member benefits like condos, health check-ups, and celebration/condolence support, and organizing both internal and external events and fam tours to aid program development.

==== Education and Training ====
The organization undertakes educational initiatives, providing training and education for both members and aspiring broadcast writers. This involves the Gyeongbokgung Newcomer Award held each January, as well as the publication of collections featuring work from new artists and creative writing graduates.

==== Other business ====
On an organizational level, the group holds regular general meetings each February and supports the recruitment and activities of new broadcast writers quarterly. They also maintain various internal committees and provide online business support. Additionally, the organization cooperates with external parties to help improve the status of broadcasters.

== History ==
In December 1956, a social group was formed among broadcast writers: The Korea Broadcast Playwrights Association (Korean: 한국방송극작가협회; Hanja: 韓國放送劇作家協會; lit. 'Korea Broadcast Playwrights Association').

In February 1964, Lee Seo-gu, Han Un-sa, Joo Tae-ik, and Choi Yo-an proposed the formation of The Broadcast Drama Writers Association (Korean: 방송극작가협; Hanja: 放送劇作家協; lit. 'Broadcast Drama Writers Association') to promote friendship among broadcast writers, advocate for their rights and interests, and contribute to national culture through the improvement, development, and exchange of broadcasting literature. Lee Seo-gu was elected as the first chairman. In 1965, Kim Hee-chang became the second chairman, with Joo Tae-ik and Choi Yo-an as vice-chairmen.

In 1966, Han Un-sa became the third chairman, with Cho Nam-sa as vice-chairman. In February 1967, Cho Nam-sa became the fourth chairman, with Joo Tae-ik as vice-chairman. In September 1967, an office was opened on the third floor of the Broadcasting Center. In February 1968, Cho Nam-sa became the fifth chairman, with Lee Yong-chan as vice-chairman. In May 1969, the association applied for membership in the International Writers' Guild (IWG), and membership was approved at the Moscow convention in September of the same year.

In 1970, the association was renamed the Korea Broadcast Writers Association. It was registered as a social organization with the Ministry of Culture and Public Information (Registration No. 270). Membership was expanded to include non-drama writers. In February, Lee Yong-chan was appointed as the 6th Chairman with Choo Sik as the Vice Chairman. In July, the organization experienced a loss of IWG regular membership. In September, the association received a presidential group commendation for its contribution to the savings movement.

In February 1971, the number of directors was increased from 6 to 9, with Lee Yong-chan as the 7th Chairman and Kim Jung-hee as the Deputy Chairman. In April of the same year, an exchange meeting was held with the Japan Broadcast Writers Association. In September, the association received a presidential group commendation for its contribution to the savings movement.

In February 1972, Han Un-sa became the 8th Chairman of the Board, with Lee Ho-won as Deputy Chairman and Attorney Tae Yoon-ki as legal advisor. Efforts were made in April to strengthen the association's secretariat and host a broadcast writers' seminar. In May, the association participated in Saemaul and industrial inspections. June saw the association attending the 1st Buddhist academic seminar at Beomeosa Temple in Busan. In October, the association oversaw the construction of a tombstone for the late Lim Hee-jae and held a ceremony in memory of the late member Kim Min-bu, a former association president.

In 1973, Han Un-sa was appointed as the 9th Chairman of KTRWA, with Lee Ho-won serving as the Vice Chairman. In August, KTRWA, In order to create a sound broadcast criticism climate, started to recruit broadcast critics. and began awarding screenplay awards at the Korea Broadcasting Awards. The first winners were writer Min Byeong-hoon in the radio category and writer Kim Soo-hyun in the television category.

The following year, in 1974, Lee Seo-gu became the 10th Chairman, with Choi Yo-an as the Vice-Chairman. In 1975, a seminar for broadcast writers was held under the theme of 'Social functions of broadcast dramas.'

In 1976, Han Un-sa returned as the 11th Chairman, and Lee Yong-chan was appointed as the Vice Chairman.

In March 1977, a copyright infringement lawsuit divided the association, leading to the formation of the 'Korea Broadcasting Playwrights Association' with Cho Nam-sa as the 12th Chairman, and Shim Young-sik and Choi Poong serving as Vice-Chairmen. In August 1977, Chairman Cho Nam-sa declared the unconditional integration of the two divided writers' organizations at a press conference. An interim general meeting was then held to revamp the executive team, with Joo Tae-ik becoming the 13th Chairman and Kim Kyo-sik as Vice-Chairman. Joo Tae-ik died in February 1978.

This division continued until August 1978, when the Ministry of Culture, Sports and Tourism intervened and agreed on 4 points regarding the divided Writers Association.

During this period of discord, in September 1977, the association managed to sign a collective agreement with the broadcasting association. The following month, a broadcast writers' seminar was hosted on the topic of "What are we going to write now?" In November 1977, a trial decision was reached in a copyright infringement case against MBC filed by member Lee Jae-woo. Then in December 1977, members Min Byeong-hun and Park I-yeop filed a similar copyright infringement lawsuit against MBC. Also that year, the MBC network fee was initially set at 10%, before later being increased to 15%.

Han Un-sa was once again appointed as the 14th Chairman in 1980, with Choi Poong as the Vice-Chairman.

In December 1981, Yoo Ho became the 15th Chairman, with Shim Young-sik as the Vice Chairman. In 1982, KTRWA filed a lawsuit against KBS for copyright royalties and won. The leadership continued in 1983, with Yoo Ho as the 16th Chairman and Shim Young-sik and Lee Eun-seong as the Vice-Chairmen.

The 19th Chairman, appointed in 1986, was Shim Young-sik. He won over Shim Bong-seum. Yang Geun-seung and Lee Kwan-seok serving as Vice-chairmen.

In 1987, Kim Soo-hyun was elected as the 20th Chairman of KTRWA, with Yang Geun-seung and Lee Kwan-seok serving as Vice-chairmen, and Jo In-joong as a legal advisor. Under Kim's leadership, significant developments took place regarding the legal status of the association. In August 1987, KTRWA submitted registration documents for changes to social organizations to the Ministry of Culture and Public Information. In March 1988, KTRWA applied to the Ministry of Culture, Sports and Tourism to establish an incorporated association, which was officially established the following April. To address copyright issues, KTRWA joined the Korea Copyright Association in May 1988 and obtained a copyright trust management business license, allowing them to manage copyright trusts and play a key role in protecting the rights of broadcasting writers.

The association was also active in fostering writer education. In July 1988, KTRWA opened The Korean Broadcasting Writers Education Institute to nurture new writers. Since 1989, the association has been publishing the monthly magazine Broadcast Literature.

The association also worked on protecting the rights of broadcasting writers. In August 1987, they requested the KBS division to stop selling copies of broadcast program videos. In 1988, negotiations on copyright royalties with the KBS business group were reopened, resulting in a successful settlement in 1991. In July 1993, a meeting was convened to negotiate manuscript fees with KBS, MBC, and SBS, followed by a request in September 1994 to review the 'screenplay writing commission contracts' of the three broadcasting companies, resulting in corrections being made in November 1995. On December 13, 1993, KTRWA re-elected Chairman Kim Soo-hyun as the 22nd chairman for another two-year term.

On December 13, 1995, Shin Sang-il was elected as the 23rd chairman of the KTRWA for a 2-year term. Despite a close competition with Lee Hee-woo, Shin won by a large margin of 236 to 64 votes. This the first time a radio scriptwriter became the chairman of the association, rather than a drama writer, with elected leader in his early 50s. During Shin's chairmanship, several events occurred. In 1996, the KTRWA organized a Broadcast Writers Seminar with a focus on the theme of "Modern Society and Family". In 1997, Shin Sang-il established a 30-pyeong (approximately 99 square meters) writing and data room in the Geumsan Building in Yeouido, Seoul, on February 18. This room housed over 500 volumes of broadcasting-related materials. Additionally, in August of the same year, the association launched the magazine "Broadcasting Writer" to showcase the experiences and research of broadcast writers.

In 1998, Lee Hee-woo was appointed as the 24th Chairman of the KTRWA. In February 2000, he was re-elected for his 4th term as the 25th Chairman. In that same year, a usage contract was signed with the Korea Educational Broadcasting Corporation (EBS).

In April 2001, genre-specific research group workshops were conducted, covering drama, culture, entertainment, radio, and translation. In 2002, a contract was signed with Secotech Co., Ltd. to publish SBS drama scripts in China. The monthly Broadcast Literature was established in April 2006, and the association participated in the East Asia Broadcast Writers Conference in June. Additionally, a seminar for Korean and Japanese broadcast writers took place in Tokyo, Japan, in October.

In 2004, Park Jeong-ran was elected as 26th chairman of the KTRWA. During her tenure, the KTRWA organized The East Asian Broadcast Writers' Conference at the Westin Chosun Hotel in Haeundae, Busan on June 15–16, 2006. The event, themed 'The homogeneity of Asian culture seen through TV dramas,' was hosted by the Asian Cultural Industry Exchange Foundation. A total of 62 East Asian drama writers, including 20 Koreans, 20 Japanese, 17 Chinese, and 5 Taiwanese, attended the event. Notable attendees included Han Woon-sa, Noh Hee-kyung, Kim Woon-kyung, Choi Yeon-ji, and Song Jeong-rim, along with Park Jeong-ran. This seminar marked the first large-scale gathering of renowned writers from various East Asian countries to discuss a common topic.

In the following year, in April, the KTRWA initiated a project to collect and preserve broadcast program scripts in order to create a digital library. They aimed to classify and archive scripts by writer, year, broadcasting company, and program for public access. The association formed a project group to secure and organize scripts and introduce a digital library. They collected scripts until June 30 and welcomed contributions from private collectors.

In 2008, documentary writer Kim Ok-young was elected as chairman of the KTRWA, becoming the second non-drama writer to lead the association after chairman Shin Sang-il, a broadcast critic. She won the election over writer Kim Un-kyung, with support from non-drama writers who outnumbered drama writers in the voting. This shift in leadership led to the departure of four drama writers from the association, including Jeong Ha-yeon, Kim Soo-hyun, Yang Geun-seung, and Jeong Jae-woo.

In 2009, Korea Broadcast Writers Association, which had been in conflict with KBS over the PD writing system, announced on the 30th that "both sides have resolved it amicably.

In February 2012, Lee Geum-rim was appointed as the 28th chairman of the Korean Television and Radio Writers' Association (KTRWA). On April 29, Lee issued a statement on behalf of KTRWA members in support of strikes at MBC, KBS, and YTN broadcasters. The statement called on the government and ruling party to intervene and resolve the strikes. It highlighted concerns about fairness and independence in broadcasting over the past four years, citing interference by public broadcasting executives and officials in program production, control over news and current affairs programs, and pressure on writers to change scripts. The association urged immediate action to establish institutional measures to protect broadcasting independence. Chairman Lee Geum-rim emphasized the threat to writers' livelihoods and the public's right to information due to program cancellations.

In February 24, 2016, it had elected writer Kim Un-kyung, as the 29th chairman of the KTRWA. In February 2018, an agreement was reached with five religious channels for the use of copyrighted works.

In May 2020, Lim Ki-hong became the 30th chairman of the KTRWA.

In 2024, Jeong Jae-hong was elected as the 31st chairman of the KTRWA.

== Korea Broadcasting Writers Education Centre ==
In July 1988, the Korean Broadcasting Writers Education Institute was established with the motto of discovering and nurturing new broadcast writers. The Institute teaches techniques for writing movie scripts, TV scripts, and broadcast composition scripts.

By 1996, it had 300 alumni writers, including 70 drama writers who were trained by the institute from the 1st to 13th classes, and they are now working in various broadcasting fields. Among them, the most outstanding performers were from the first class, including Choi Yeon-ji, Heo Suk, Jo Han-sun, Jo Hee, Choi Hyeon-kyung, Ha Cheong-ok, and Choi Soon-sik. Additionally, writers from the second class like Moon Young-nam, Park Ji-hyun, Lee Hye-won, Seo Hyeon-ju, Ahn Geum-rim, and Moon Kyung-sim have also made significant contributions. The institute also has produced star writers such as Noh Hee-kyung, Moon Young-nam, Kim Do-woo, Jeong Hyeong-soo, and Kim Gyu-wan.

== Korean Broadcasting Writers Award ==
Established in 1989, the Korean Broadcast Writers Award recognizes impactful content that resonates with the public, contributes positively to society, and elevates the status of broadcast writers while celebrating their cultural contributions. It honors writers across diverse broadcasting mediums, including drama, current affairs, entertainment, radio, and special segments. Recipients are awarded a plaque and a 10 million won creative writing support fee. The awarded works are published in the 'Korean Broadcast Writer Award Winner Collection' alongside other excellent works selected by the judging committee.

The Korean Broadcast Writers Award was an annual spring event from 1989 to 1996, but since 1997 the ceremony has taken place every December to honor works aired between November of the previous year and October of the current year. Notably, there were several years where no winning entries were selected, including the 9th event in 1997 which had no winners at all, as well as the television category having no winners at the 2nd (1990) and 6th (1994) events, and the radio category also having no winners at the 3rd event in 1991.

Originally focusing on TV and radio writing, since the 7th event in 1995, the award expanded to include drama and variety shows. MBC's The Moon of Seoul became the first drama to win the award at the 7th event. The drama category, previously part of the TV category, was based on culturally valuable or purely creative works by a single author. However, from the 31st edition onward, collaborative writing became eligible for the award.

The Korean Broadcasting Writers Awards' drama category has a rule that prohibits writers from winning the award more than once. This rule affected writer Kim Un-kyung, who won drama category award at the 7th Korean Broadcast Writers Award for MBC's The Moon of Seoul. He was nominated the next year in the same category for SBS's Aunt Ok but his work was excluded. The rules also state that other excluded works include those where the writer served as a judge, those deemed lacking in maturity, and those with foreign language titles.

The 8th Korean Broadcasting Writers Award saw intense competition between SBS and KBS. The winning drama, SBS TV's Sandglass, featured Park Sang-won as Kang Woo-seok. The nominated drama KBS 2TV's Jang Nok-soo featured Park Ji-young in the title role. Additionally, Byun So-jung played Kwon Woo-ryung in the nominated KBS 2TV's Daughters of a Rich Family. Notably, all three actors, Park Sang-won, Park Ji-young, and Byun So-jung, were former MBC in-house talents. Meanwhile, MBC did not receive any nominations at this event.

MBC's The Moon of Seoul made history as the first winner in the drama category at the 7th Korean Broadcast Writers Awards. However, later MBC faced a 3-year drought without any drama award win. Their weekend dramas, except for Cinderella, struggled to compete with KBS 2TV's shows. Despite nominations like The Youth of Sunshine at the 8th Korean Broadcasting Writers Awards in 1996, MBC dramas like Brothers, Open Your Heart, and If You Love faced early elimination. It wasn't until their award win for You and I that MBC drama regained recognition. The screenwriter of You and I, Kim Jung-soo, won Drama Award at the 11th Korean Broadcast Writers Awards.
