= Now in Pyongyang =

1982–1985 South Korean television series

- Hangul: 지금 평양에선
- Hanja: 只今 平壤에선
- RR: Jigeum Pyeongyangeseon
- MR: Chigŭm P'yŏngyangesŏn
- Genre: Politics
- Starring: Kim Byung-ki; Choi Seon-ja; Heo Jin; Kim Seong-gyeom; Sa Mi-ja; Shin Jong-seop; Kim Man-man; Baek Il-seob
- Country of origin: South Korea
- Original language: Korean
- No. of episodes: 199

Original release
- Network: KBS1
- Release: November 30, 1982 – May 14, 1985

Now in Pyongyang (Korean: 지금 평양에선) is a South Korean TV series depicting the top political echelons of North Korea in 1980s, with Kim Jong Il as the protagonist. As part of South Korea's anti-North Korean propaganda at the time, the drama shows Kim's vicious side and his tyranny over women, but it also tries to show that Kim has a human side. It aired on KBS1 from 30 November 1982 to 14 May 1985, with a total of 199 episodes. The drama was a huge success at the time, and the actor Kim Byung-ki, who played Kim Jong Il, shot to fame.

== Cast ==
=== Main ===
- Kim Byung-ki as Kim Jong Il
- Unknown as Kim Il Sung
- Choi Seon-ja as Han Seong-hee
- Heo Jin as Kim Kyung- hee
- Kim Seong-gyeom as Kim Young-joo
- Sa Mi-ja as Kim Seong-ae
- Shin Jong-seop as Kim Seong-gap
- Kim Man-man as Kim Pyong-il
- Baek Il-seob as Yang Hyung-seop

=== Military ===
- Lee Chi-woo as Oh Jin-woo
- Kang Min-ho as Kim Yong-hyeon
- Hwang Min as Oh Geuk-ryeol
- Lee Chun-sik as Oh Baek-ryong
- Jang Hak-su as Lee Eul-seol
- Kim Soon-cheol as Choi Hyun
- Moon Oh-jang as Kim Cheol-man

=== Bureaucracy ===
- Lee Il-woong as Kim Il
- Kim Heung-ki as Kim Young-nam
- Choi Jeong-hoon as Kim Hwan

=== Others ===
- Kang Hyo-shil as Heo Chang-suk
- Lim Seong-min as Kim Kyung-joon
- Yon Sang-mi as Woo Soon-i
- Kim Seong-nyeo as Choi Eun-hee
- Ban Moon-seop as Kim Guk-tae
- Ban Hyo-jung as Kim Jung-sook
- Han Jeong-guk as Li Xiannian

=== Special appearance ===
- Lee Dae-ro
- Kim Hae-kwon
- Kim Jin-tae
- Joo Hyun
- Park In-hwan
- Jang Hang-sun
- Lim Byung-ki
- Kang Tae-ki
- Lee Jeong-woong
- Nam Il-woo
- Song Hee-nam
- Song Jong-won
- Lee Shin-jae
- Jung Young-sook
- Park Joo-ah
- Hong Young-ja
- Lee Soon-jae
- Ahn Kwang-jin
- Choi Jae-sung
- Choi Woo-baek
- Yoon Seong-gook
- Han Hyun-bae
- Son Young-chun
- Jeon Young-mi
