= Kim Byung-ki =

South Korean actor (born 1948)

- Born: November 2, 1948 (age 77); South Korea
- Education: Chung-Ang University
- Occupation: Actor
- Years active: 1969–present
- Spouse: Jang Gyeong-hwa

Korean name
- Hangul: 김병기
- Hanja: 金柄基
- RR: Gim Byeonggi
- MR: Kim Pyŏnggi

Kim Byung-ki (born November 2, 1948) is a South Korean actor.

== Filmography ==
=== Television series ===
Year	Title	Role	Network
1981	People of Bawigol		KBS1
1982	Now in Pyongyang	Kim Jung-il	KBS1
1985	Taepyeongmu (Great Peace Dance)		KBS2
1990	The End of Love	Prosecutor Park Sang-do	MBC
1991	Humble Men	Deok-geun	MBC
1992	Man in Crisis		KBS2
1992	Time and Tears		KBS1
1993	When I Miss You		KBS1
1995	Sandglass	Kang Dong-hwan	SBS
1995	Blowing of the Wind		KBS1
1996	Jo Gwang-jo	Park Won-jong	KBS2
1996	Brothers' River		SBS
1996	Splendid Holiday		MBC
1997	Sea of Ambition	Deputy manager Park	KBS2
1997	Revenge and Passion	Lee Choon-sam	MBC
1998	The King and the Queen	Eom Ja-chi	KBS1
1998	White Nights 3.98	Oh Geuk-chul	SBS
2000	Virtue	Innkeeper at inlet	SBS
2001	Soon-ja	Pi-el Jang	SBS
2001	Empress Myeongseong	Ryunosuke Okamoto	KBS2
2002	Miss Mermaid	Lee Sung-soo	MBC
2002	The Great Ambition	His Excellency Yun	SBS
2003	Age of Warriors	Noh In-woo	KBS1
2003	Scent of a Man	Jung Tae-hwan	MBC
2003	First Love	Yoon Seo-kyung's father	SBS
2003	The King's Woman	Maeng Jicheon	SBS
2004	Jang Gil-san	Kim Ki	SBS
2004	Lotus Flower Fairy	Kim Moo-bin's father	SBS
2004	Save the Last Dance for Me	Boss Joo	SBS
2005	5th Republic	No Sin-yeong	MBC
2005	Lawyers	Go Young-joong	MBC
2005	Golden Apple	CEO Han	KBS2
2005	The Conker Tree	Kim Maeng-oh	EBS
2006	Jumong	Yuntabal	MBC
2006	HDTV Literature "Deungsinbul"	Steward	KBS1
2007	Salt Doll	CEO Kang	SBS
2007	Ahyeon-dong Madam	Baek Je-ra	MBC
2008	Hometown over the Hill	Entrepreneur (cameo)	KBS1
2008	Shanghai Brothers	Kim Joong-man	DramaX
2008	The Kingdom of the Winds	Sang Ga	KBS2
2009	Empress Cheonchu	Kim Won-seung	KBS2
2009	He Who Can't Marry	Jang Bong-soo	KBS2
2009	Wife Returns	Min Sung-tae	SBS
2010	The Great Merchant	Jung Do-woong	KBS1
2010	Freedom Fighter, Lee Hoe-young	Okuma	KBS1
2010	Flames of Desire	Kim Young-dae	MBC
2011	Midas	Goo Sung-chul	SBS
2011	Gyebaek	Sa Taek Jeok Deok	MBC
2011	Lights and Shadows	Kim Jae-wook	MBC
2012	Immortal Classic	Seo Don-man	Channel A
2013	Hur Jun, The Original Story	Sung In-chul	MBC
2014	Inspiring Generation	Fortune-teller	KBS2
2014	Triangle	Yoon Tae-joon	MBC
2016	Jang Yeong-sil	Maeng Sa-seong	KBS1
2017	My Golden Life	Noh Yang-ho	KBS2
2018	Love Alert	Cha Tae-soo	MBN
2019	Item	Jo Kwan	MBC
2021	The Veil		MBC

=== Film ===
Year	Title	Role
2000	The Promenade	(cameo)

== Awards and nominations ==
Year	Award	Category	Nominated work	Result
1977	KBS Drama Awards	Top Excellence Award, Actor		Won
2007	MBC Drama Awards	Golden Acting Award, Veteran Actor	Ahyeon-dong Madam	Won
