= Choi Won-hyeong =

South Korean voice actor

Choi Won-hyeong (Korean: 최원형; born December 5, 1968) is a South Korean voice actor who joined the Munhwa Broadcasting Corporation's Voice Acting Division in 1993.

== Roles ==
=== Theatrical animation ===
- The Rescuers Down Under - Jake
- A Goofy Movie - Max Goof
- The Lion King II: Simba's Pride - Kovu
- Ratatouille - Linguini
- Toy Story 3 - Ken
- Frozen - Hans Westergaard

=== Broadcast TV ===
- Hell Girl - Gilles de L'Enfer
- 24 (replacing Carlos Bernard, Korea TV Edition, MBC)
- Miracle Girls (Korea TV Edition, MBC)
- Vectorman (Korea TV Edition, KBS)
- Maxman (Korea TV Edition, KBS)
- Surprise Mystery TV (narration, MBC)
- Jinsil Game (narration, SBS)
- Cybertron (Korea TV Edition, SBS)
- Dr. Slump (Korea TV Edition, MBC)
- Red Baron (Korea TV Edition, MBC)
- Komi's Cartoon Curiosity Heaven (SBS)
- Elemental Gelade (Korea TV Edition, Tooniverse) - Coud Van Ciruet
- MÄR (Korea TV Edition, Tooniverse) - Nanashi
- To Heart (Korea TV Edition, Tooniverse) - Hiroyuki Fujita
- City Hunter (Korea TV Edition, Tooniverse) - Hideyuki Makimura
- A Certain Magical Index - Tōma Kamijō

=== Live action films ===
- The Fast and The Furious (replacing Paul Walker, Korea TV Edition, MBC)
- All the Pretty Horses (replacing Billy Bob Thornton, Korea TV Edition, MBC)
- Hidalgo (replacing Viggo Mortensen, Korea TV Edition, MBC)
- Around the World in 80 Days (replacing Steve Coogan, Korea TV Edition, MBC)
- The Big Hit (replacing Mark Wahlberg, Korea TV Edition, SBS)

=== Games ===
- The War of Genesis III Part.2. - Demian von Prios
- Grand Chase - Asin
- Elsword - In
- World of Warcraft - Kalecgos (~ World of Warcraft: Warlords of Draenor), Varo'then
- Digimon Masters - Marcus Damon
- Sly Cooper - Bentley Wiseturtle
- MapleStory
  - Demon (in game)
  - MapleStory Surprise Mystery TV official parody YouTube videos (Chapter 1. A Story Has Not Ended, Chapter 3. The City of God, Cernium)
- Diablo III: Reaper of Souls
- Yu-Gi-Oh! Duel Links - Hiroto Honda / Tristan Taylor
- Cookie Run: Kingdom - Dark Choco Cookie (formerly)

== Awards ==
- 2007 MBC Drama Awards, Best TV Voice Actor (CSI: NY)
