= Eom Hyeon-jeong =

South Korean voice actress

Eom Hyeon-jeong, also known as Um Hyun-jung, is a South Korean voice actress. She joined the Munhwa Broadcasting Corporation's voice acting division in 1996. It is popular voice acting to MBC's Ojamajo Doremi and Bikkuriman. Currently, Eom Hyeon-jeong is cast in the Korea TV edition of 24 as Sherry Palmer, replacing Penny Johnson Jerald.

== Roles ==
=== Broadcasting TV ===
- 24 (replacing Penny Johnson Jerald, Korea TV edition, MBC)
- Bikkuriman (Korea TV edition, MBC)
- Ojamajo Doremi (Korea TV edition, MBC)
- TV Special Surprise World (MBC)
- Culture is Life (MBC)
- TV Surprise (MBC)

=== Film dubbing ===
- Tomorrow Never Dies (replacing Michelle Yeoh, Korea TV Edition, MBC)
- Used People (replacing Kathy Bates, Korea TV edition, MBC)
- Circle of Friends (replacing Minnie Driver, Korea TV edition, MBC)
- Immortal Beloved (replacing Isabella Rossellini, Korea TV edition, MBC)
- Ghost (replacing Whoopi Goldberg, Korea TV edition, MBC)
- Once Around (replacing Holly Hunter, Korea TV edition, MBC)
- The Firm (replacing Holly Hunter, Korea TV edition, MBC)
- Underworld (replacing Kate Bekensale, Korea TV edition, MBC)
- Copycat (replacing Holly Hunter, Korea TV edition, MBC)
- Marselle Summer (replacing Natalie Rosselle, Korea TV edition, MBC)
- The Son's Room (replacing Laura Morante, Korea TV edition, MBC)
- The Addams Family (replacing Joan Cousak, Korea TV edition, MBC)
- H2O (replacing Jamie Lee Curtis, Korea TV edition, MBC)
- Bogus (Korea TV edition, MBC)
- Ae Soo (Korea TV edition, MBC)
- Absolute Power (Korea TV edition, SBS)
- Chicago (replacing Christine Baranski, Korea TV edition, MBC)
- Cold Mountain (replacing Renée Zellweger, Korea TV edition, MBC)

=== Video games ===
- Cupid Empire

== Awards ==
- 2007 MBC Drama Awards, Best TV Voice Actor (CSI: Miami)

== See also ==
- Munhwa Broadcasting Corporation
- MBC Voice Acting Division
