= The Slingshot =

2009 South Korean television series

- Promotional poster
- Also known as: Story of a Man; A Man's Story
- Genre: Action; Thriller
- Written by: Song Ji-na
- Directed by: Yoon Sung-sik
- Starring: Park Yong-ha; Park Si-yeon; Kim Kang-woo; Han Yeo-woon; Lee Phillip; Park Ki-woong
- Music by: Kim Hyeong-seok
- Country of origin: South Korea
- Original language: Korean
- No. of seasons: 1
- No. of episodes: 20

Production
- Production location: Korea
- Running time: Mondays and Tuesdays at 21:55 (KST)
- Production companies: G.Entro Pictures; Film Book

Original release
- Network: KBS2
- Release: 6 April – 9 June 2009

The Slingshot (Korean: 남자이야기; RR: Namjaiyagi; lit. Story of a Man) is a 2009 South Korean television series starring Park Yong-ha, Park Si-yeon, Kim Kang-woo, Han Yeo-woon, Lee Phillip, and Park Ki-woong. It aired on KBS2 from April 6 to June 9, 2009, on Mondays and Tuesdays at 21:55 for 20 episodes.

The Slingshot is about a wronged hero who gets himself thrown in jail, then formulates the ultimate plan for vengeance by enlisting the help of a few prison buddies to form a team, and beating the villain at his own game. It won Best Drama Series at the 2009 Seoul International Drama Awards.

This was Park Yong-ha's last acting project before he committed suicide in June 2010.

== Plot ==
In the blink of an eye, Kim Shin (Park Yong-ha) loses everything dear to him. His father's company goes bankrupt, his brother commits suicide, his girlfriend (Park Si-yeon) leaves him, and he himself ends up in jail for a crime he didn't commit. While in prison, Shin learns that all of this was brought about by corporation head Chae Do-woo (Kim Kang-woo), who devised the scam that brought down his father. Determined to beat Do-woo at his own game, Shin sets out to get revenge, no matter the cost. More and more people are pulled into the unforgiving battle of wits as stakes are raised, secrets are revealed, and love turns into a weapon.

== Cast ==
=== Main characters ===
- Park Yong-ha as Kim Shin
- Park Si-yeon as Seo Kyung-ah
- Kim Kang-woo as Chae Do-woo
- Han Yeo-woon as Chae Eun-soo
- Lee Phillip as Do Jae-myung
  - Jung Chan-woo as young Do Jae-myung
- Park Ki-woong as Ahn Kyung-tae
- Lee Moon-sik as Park Moon-ho

=== Supporting characters ===
- Jang Se-jin as Beom-hwan
- Kim Hyung-bum as Joong-ho
- Baek Jae-jin as Yong-shik
- Jeon Jae-hyung as Jae-seop
- Jang Hang-sun as President Chae
- Kim Roi-ha as Director Oh
- Park Sun-woo as Danny
- Lee Seung-bok as Lee Dae-pyo
- Heo Wook as Kei
- Han Song-yi as Yeon-hee
- Kim Mi-kyung as Detective Kim
- Choi Ji-na as Madam Jang
- Lee Byung-joon as Do Man-hee
- Bang Eun-hee as Myung-sun
- Ahn Nae-sang as Kim Wook
- Jeon Sung-hwan as Mayor
- Won Deok-hyun as young Chae Do-woo
- Min Joon-hyun as hospital official
- Lee Tae-im
- Choi Yoon-young

== Ratings ==
| Date | Episode | Nationwide | Seoul |
|---|---|---|---|
| 2009-04-06 | 1 | 6.6% | 8.1% |
| 2008-04-07 | 2 | 6.6% | 7.4% |
| 2009-04-13 | 3 | 8.6% (18th) | 9.2% (16th) |
| 2009-04-14 | 4 | 7.2% | 7.9% |
| 2009-04-20 | 5 | 7.6% | 8.5% |
| 2009-04-21 | 6 | 7.5% | 8.4% |
| 2009-04-27 | 7 | 7.1% | 7.8% |
| 2009-04-28 | 8 | 6.6% | 7.5% |
| 2009-05-04 | 9 | 6.9% | 8.1% |
| 2009-05-05 | 10 | 9.0% | 9.4% |
| 2009-05-11 | 11 | 7.3% | 8.3% |
| 2009-05-12 | 12 | 8.0% | 8.0% |
| 2009-05-18 | 13 | 8.0% | 8.0% |
| 2009-05-19 | 14 | 7.7% (20th) | 7.6% (20th) |
| 2009-05-25 | 15 | 9.8% (12th) | 9.2% (13th) |
| 2009-05-26 | 16 | 9.6% (15th) | 9.2% (16th) |
| 2009-06-01 | 17 | 8.7% (18th) | 8.2% (18th) |
| 2009-06-02 | 18 | 9.3% (15th) | 9.1% (17th) |
| 2009-06-08 | 19 | 9.0% (17th) | 8.9% (16th) |
| 2008-08-19 | 20 | 9.7% (15th) | 9.4% (13th) |
| Average | | 8.0% | - |

Source: TNS Media Korea

== Awards and nominations ==
| Year | Award | Category | Recipient | Result |
|---|---|---|---|---|
| 2009 | 4th Seoul International Drama Awards | Best Series Drama | The Slingshot | Won |
| 2009 | 4th Seoul International Drama Awards | Best Actor | Park Yong-ha | Nominated |
| 2009 | 23rd KBS Drama Awards | Excellence Award, Actor in a Mid-length Drama | Park Yong-ha | Nominated |
| 2009 | 23rd KBS Drama Awards | Excellence Award, Actress in a Mid-length Drama | Park Si-yeon | Nominated |
| 2009 | 23rd KBS Drama Awards | Best Supporting Actor | Lee Moon-sik | Nominated |
| 2009 | 23rd KBS Drama Awards | Best New Actor | Park Ki-woong | Nominated |
| 2009 | 23rd KBS Drama Awards | Best Couple | Park Yong-ha & Park Si-yeon | Nominated |

== International broadcast ==
It aired in Japan on cable channel BS, followed by terrestrial network TBS.
