= Kim Jong-hak Production =

South Korean television production company

KIMJONGHAK Production Co., Ltd.
- Native name: 김종학프로덕션
- Industry: Entertainment and media production
- Predecessor: Jcom Co., Ltd. (founded in 1992)
- Founded: February 1999; 27 years ago in Seoul, South Korea
- Founder: Kim Jong-hak
- Headquarters: Seoul, South Korea
- Key people: Sohn Ki-won (CEO)
- Products: Korean dramas
- Services: Production, distribution, translation
- Parent: Copus Korea (2022)
- Website: www.kjhpro.com

Kim Jong-hak Production (Korean: 김종학프로덕션) is a South Korean drama production company, currently operating as a subsidiary of Copus Korea It was established in February 1999 by South Korean television director and producer Kim Jong-hak.

It is the successor to Jcom, the company founded in 1992 by Kim and writer Song Ji-na.

== Works ==
Year	Title	Network	Associated Production	Ref.
1999	Ghost	SBS TV	—N/a	
2000	Golden Age	MBC TV	—N/a	
2001	Shinhwa	SBS TV	—N/a	
2001	Beautiful Days	SBS TV	—N/a	
2002	Shoot the Stars	SBS TV	—N/a	
2002	The Great Ambition (TV series)	SBS TV	—N/a	
2002	Glass Slippers	SBS TV	—N/a	
2002	Present	MBC TV	—N/a	
2003	A Problem at My Younger Brother's House	SBS TV	—N/a	
2003	Rosemary	KBS2	—N/a	
2003	Good Person	MBC TV	—N/a	
2003	First Love	SBS TV	—N/a	
2004	Emperor of the Sea	KBS2	—N/a	
2004	When a Man Loves a Woman	SBS TV	—N/a	
2004	Full House	KBS2	—N/a	
2004	Sunlight Pours Down	SBS TV	—N/a	
2004	Oh Feel Young	KBS2	—N/a	
2005	Princess Lulu	SBS TV	—N/a	
2005	Love Hymn	MBC TV	—N/a	
2005	Fashion 70s	SBS TV	—N/a	
2005	Sad Love Story	MBC TV	—N/a	
2006	The Vineyard Man	KBS2	—N/a	
2006	Look Back With a Smile	KBS2	—N/a	
2006	Which Star Are You From	MBC TV	—N/a	
2006	Hello, God	KBS2	—N/a	
2006	Special of My Life	MBC TV	—N/a	
2006	Ballad of Seodong	SBS TV	—N/a	
2007	In-soon is Pretty	KBS2	—N/a	
2007	Lee San, Wind of the Palace	MBC TV	—N/a	
2007	H.I.T	MBC TV	—N/a	
2007	Behind the White Tower	MBC TV	—N/a	
2007	Dal-ja's Spring	KBS2	—N/a	
2007	The Person I Love	SBS TV	—N/a	
2008	Beethoven Virus	MBC TV	—N/a	
2008	One Mom and Three Dads	KBS2	RaemongRaein	
2010	Jejungwon	SBS TV	My Name Is Entertainment	
2010	The Woman Who Still Wants to Marry	MBC TV	—N/a	
2011	Glory Jane	KBS2	—N/a	
2011	Bravo, My Love!	MBC TV	—N/a	
2012	The King's Doctor	MBC TV	—N/a	
2012	Full House Take 2	SBS Plus	—N/a	
2012	I Do, I Do	MBC TV	—N/a	
2012	The Chaser	SBS TV	The Chaser SPC	
2012	The King 2 Hearts	MBC TV	—N/a	
2013	I Can Hear Your Voice	SBS TV	DRM Media	
2014	Big Man	KBS2	KBS Media	
2014	Healer	KBS2	—N/a	
2015	Flower of Queen	MBC TV	GnG Production	
2015	Beating Again	JTBC	Doremi Entertainment	
2015	Splendid Politics	MBC TV	—N/a	
2015	The Man in the Mask	KBS2	—N/a	
2015	High-End Crush	Sohu; Naver TV; MBN	Sohu	
2016	Flowers of the Prison	MBC TV	—N/a	
2016	Thumping Spike	Sohu	Sohu	
2016	Thumping Spike 2	Sohu	Sohu	
2016	Gogh, The Starry Night	SBS TV; Sohu	Sohu	
2016	Our Gap-soon	SBS TV	Chorokbaem Media	
2017	Man in the Kitchen	MBC TV	GnG Productions	
2017	Untouchable	JTBC	Drama House	
2018	Witch's Love	MBN	—N/a	
2018	Room No. 9	tvN	Studio Dragon	
2018	Where Stars Land	SBS TV	Samhwa Networks	
2018	My Healing Love	MBC TV	Chorokbaem Media	
2019	Haechi	SBS TV	—N/a	
2019	The Golden Garden	MBC TV	—N/a	
2019	Welcome 2 Life	MBC TV	—N/a	
2020	Awaken	tvN	Story Vine Pictures; Studio Dragon	
2021	Next Door Witch J	Watcha	—N/a	
2022	All of Us Are Dead	Netflix	Film Monster	
2023	Celebrity	Netflix	Studio Dragon; How Pictures	
2023	Daily Dose of Sunshine	Netflix	Film Monster	
2024	Bad Memory Eraser	MBN	Studio Jidam; Chorokbaem Media	

== Managed people ==
=== Producers ===
- Lee Byung-hoon
- Lee Tae-gon
- Lee Sang-hoom
- Park Chan-yool
- Jang Jin
- Gong Soo-chang
- Choi Yoon-seok

=== Writers ===
- Song Ji-na
- Kang Eun-kyung
- Jung Sung-hee
- Choi Yoon-jung
- Kim In-young
- Lee Sun-hee
- Son Eun-hye
- Yeo Ji-na
- Shin Jung-goo
- Jo Myung-joo
- Lee Ki-won
- Jo Jung-hwa

== Former managed people ==
=== Directors ===
- Lee Jae-kyoo (became founder and co-CEO of Film Monster Co.)
- Lee Kang-hoon (became founder and executive chairman of May Queen Pictures)
- Pyo Min-soo (became founder and co-CEO of Company Ching; also managed by C.A.M.P Entertainment)

=== Writers ===
- Jung Yoo-kyung (now managed by Pan Entertainment)
- Kim Yi-young (now managed by Mega Monster)
- Min Hyo-jung (now managed by iWill Media)
- Park Kyung-soo (now managed by Pan Entertainment)
