= Push! Push! (film) =

1997 film by Park Cheol-su

- Film poster
- Hangul: 산부인과
- Hanja: 産婦人科
- RR: Sanbuingwa
- MR: Sanbuinkwa
- Directed by: Park Chul-soo
- Written by: Chi Sang-hak; Byeon Won-mi
- Produced by: Hwang Gyeong-seong; Kim Jong-hak
- Starring: Hwang Shin-hye; Bang Eun-jin
- Cinematography: Sung Kwang-jae
- Edited by: Kim Hyeon
- Music by: Byeon Seong-ryeong
- Production company: Jcom
- Distributed by: CJ Entertainment
- Release date: May 13, 1997
- Running time: 95 minutes
- Country: South Korea
- Language: Korean

Push! Push! (Korean: 산부인과) is a 1997 South Korean black comedy film directed by Park Chul-soo about the experiences of two female doctors in an obstetrics and gynecology clinic.

== Plot ==
There are two female doctors in an obstetrics and gynecology clinic. Jung-yeon is fed up with delivering and aborting babies all day long. Hae-seok treats various gynecological diseases. They are very close friends.

Jung-yeon, who is married, puts more emphasis on being a rational woman than being a mother. On the other hand, the single Hae-seok thinks the opposite. With their own two distinct styles, they handle various cases at the clinic. One day, an unbelievable situation happens when the two doctors, a woman, her husband, and her mother-in-law all become excited about the successful birth of test-tube twins.

== Cast ==
- Hwang Shin-hye
- Bang Eun-jin
- Shin Shin-ae as Park Shin-ae, head nurse
- Seo Kap-sook
- Hong Yun-jeong
- Jo Sang-gun
- Chung Jin-gak
- Yoo Myeong-sun
- Moon Mi-bong
- Lim Yae-sim
