= Healer (TV series) =

2014-15 South Korean TV series

- Promotional poster
- Genre: Action; Thriller; Romance
- Written by: Song Ji-na
- Directed by: Lee Jung-sub; Kim Jin-woo
- Starring: Ji Chang-wook; Park Min-young; Yoo Ji-tae
- Theme music composer: Lee Pil-ho; Park Jong-mi
- Country of origin: South Korea
- Original language: Korean
- No. of episodes: 20

Production
- Executive producer: Bae Kyung-soo
- Producers: Mo Wan-il; Yoon Jae-hyuk
- Production location: Korea
- Running time: 60 minutes
- Production company: Kim Jong-hak Production

Original release
- Network: KBS2
- Release: December 8, 2014 – February 10, 2015

Healer (Korean: 힐러) is a 2014–2015 South Korean television series starring Ji Chang-wook, Park Min-young, and Yoo Ji-tae. It aired on KBS2 from December 8, 2014 to February 10, 2015 on Mondays and Tuesdays at 22:00 (KST) for 20 episodes.

Though the drama received modest ratings in its home country, it gained a fanbase overseas and made Ji Chang-wook known outside Korea.

== Synopsis ==
A decades-old incident involving a group of five friends who ran an illegal pro-democracy broadcasting station during the Fifth Republic in South Korea brings together three different people—an illegal "night courier" with the codename "Healer" (Ji Chang-wook) who possesses top-notch fighting skills, a reporter from a second-rate tabloid news website (Park Min-young), and a famous journalist at a major broadcast station (Yoo Ji-tae). While trying to uncover the truth from that 1992 incident and a series of present day murders, they grow into honest reporters who try to blur the lines of conflict between truth and reality, even if that means fighting media honchos.

== Cast ==
=== Main ===
- Ji Chang-wook as Seo Jung-hoo / Park Bong-soo / Healer
  - Park Si-jin as young Jung-hoo
  - Go Woo-rim as child Jung-hoo
  - Choi Jung-hu as toddler Jung-hoo

An illegal "night courier" who works under the alias "Healer". Renowned for being the best in his field, Jung-hoo is equipped not only with advanced technology and a trusty hacker sidekick, but also his superb fighting skills. He will perform any task except anything involving murder. His ultimate goal is to save money and buy an uninhabited island off the coast of Panama and to live there alone, but that changes after being given an order by his client, Kim Mun-ho, to find and protect a girl named Young-shin from the people who want her dead but he later falls in love with Young-shin.

- Park Min-young as Chae Young-shin / Oh Ji-an
  - Kim So-yeon as older Young-shin
  - Shin Soo-yeon as 10-year-old Ji-an
  - Park Ji-so as 8-year-old Ji-an
  - Ku Geon-min as 5-year-old Ji-an

A strong-willed and quirky internet news reporter who dreams of becoming a legendary reporter. However, her dreams are put to the test when she finds out about her hidden past as the lost child Oh Ji-an. Due to her abusive past, Young-shin is traumatized and suffers from panic attacks whenever she sees violence. She later falls in love with her protector, Jung-hoo.

- Yoo Ji-tae as Kim Moon-ho
  - Kim Seung-chan as young Moon-ho
  - Lee Woo-joo as child Moon-ho

A star reporter, and brother to Kim Moon-sik, the CEO of a large news company. His goal is to last each day and to find Oh Ji-an, a supposedly dead child whom he suspects to still be alive. He pays Jung-hoo (as "Healer") to find and protect Ji-an (now known as Young-shin) from the people that want her dead, out of guilt for not fully investigating the truth about a 1992 incident that ended in the tragic deaths of two out of five best friends, and the crippling of a third.

=== Supporting ===
- Kim Mi-kyung as Jo Min-ja, Hacker Ahjumma, a former detective specializing in cyber crimes.
- Park Sang-won as Kim Moon-sik, one of the initial five friends, now a highly successful CEO of a news agency.
  - Son Seung-won as young Moon-sik, driver of the truck from which the five friends ran their illegal radio station.
- Do Ji-won as Choi Myung-hee, Young-shin's biological mother, living in the present with Kim Moon-sik and using a wheelchair.
  - Jung Hye-in as young Myung-hee, one of the lead reporters in the illegal radio station.
- Oh Kwang-rok as Ki Young-jae, Jung-hoo's teacher (and the first "Healer"), one of five friends from the past.
  - Choi Dong-gu as young Young-jae, Motorcycle rider and distractor during the illegal radio broadcasts.
- Park Sang-myun as Chae Chi-soo, Young-shin's adoptive father, a lawyer specialising in defending clients accused of burglary who also runs a café where he has employed many of his former clients.
- Woo Hyun as Chul-min, a former convict and one of Chae Chi-soo's clients who now works at the café.
- Park Won-sang as Jang Byung-se, head of "Someday News", an internet tabloid news site where Chae Young-shin works.
- Jo Han-chul as Yoon Dong-won, a detective specialising in cyber crimes, formerly Jo Min-ja's hoobae.
- Taemi as Kang Dae-yong, "Healer's" assistant.
- Oh Jong-hyuk as Oh Gil-han, Young-shin's biological father, one of the lead reporters in the illegal radio station and a regular reporter after the fall of the Fifth Republic.
- Ji Il-joo as Seo Joon-seok, Jung-hoo's father, an engineer of the illegal radio station and later a photographer working with Oh Gil-han.
- Lee Kyung-shim as Jung-hoo's mother
  - Song Ji-in as young Jung-hoo's mother
- Choi Seung-kyung as Yeo Gi-ja, "Reporter Yeo" at "Someday News".
- Woo Hee-jin as Kang Min-jae, news director at "ABS News", where Kim Moon-ho works at the start of the story and also his love interest.
- Jang Seong-beom as Lee Jong-soo, Kim Moon-ho's assistant.
- Park Sang-wook as Bae Sang-soo, head of a rival "night courier" agency.
- Hong Seung-jin as Yo-yo, employed by Bae Sang-soo.
- Jung Gyu-soo as Oh Tae-won, Moon-sik's secretary and agent of "The Elder".
- Kim Ri-na as Joo Yeon-hee, an actress who turns to Chae Young-shin and her father for help.
- Choi Jong-won as Park Jung-dae, "The Elder", a shadowy figure operating behind the scenes and the CEO of Omega Holdings formerly known as Omega Venture Capital.
- Lee Moon-sik as Go Sung-chul (cameo, ep. 1)
- Nam Hee-seok (cameo, ep. 9)
- Jeon Hye-bin as Kim Jae-yoon (cameo, ep. 20)
- Jung Hae-kyun as Hwang Jae-gook
- Choi Jung-won as Lee Jun-bin

== Ratings ==
Ep.	Original broadcast date	Episode title	Average audience share			
Ep.	Original broadcast date	Episode title	Nielsen Korea		TNmS	
Ep.	Original broadcast date	Episode title	Nationwide	Seoul	Nationwide	Seoul
1	December 8, 2014	I Have a Dream	7.8% (NR)	8.3% (NR)	6.9% (NR)	7.5% (NR)
2	December 9, 2014	Fate Continues	7.9% (NR)	8.4% (NR)	7.6% (NR)	8.8% (18th)
3	December 15, 2014	The First Kiss That Day	7.2% (NR)	7.6% (NR)	5.7% (NR)	6.3% (NR)
4	December 16, 2014	Because I'm Next to You	7.4% (NR)	8.0% (NR)	5.9% (NR)	6.4% (NR)
5	December 22, 2014	Meaning of You	8.8% (19th)	9.8% (15th)	7.0% (NR)	7.4% (NR)
6	December 23, 2014	Begin	7.7% (20th)	8.0% (NR)	7.1% (NR)	7.6% (NR)
7	December 29, 2014	We, Under the Sunset	7.8% (NR)	8.9% (16th)	6.9% (NR)	7.8% (NR)
8	December 30, 2014	Cannot Be Forgotten	8.6% (19th)	9.2% (17th)	8.4% (NR)	9.4% (17th)
9	January 5, 2015	I Trust You	8.2% (NR)	8.9% (NR)	7.6% (NR)	7.8% (NR)
10	January 6, 2015	Can't It Be Me?	9.2% (17th)	10.0% (14th)	8.2% (NR)	9.5% (18th)
11	January 12, 2015	In the Darkness	9.4% (15th)	10.8% (10th)	7.4% (NR)	8.8% (NR)
12	January 13, 2015	I Don't Know How To Escape	9.1% (18th)	9.8% (14th)	8.7% (NR)	10.1% (17th)
13	January 19, 2015	I'm Waiting'	10.3% (14th)	11.3% (18th)	9.0% (18th)	9.7% (17th)
14	January 20, 2015	It's Alright Even If You Cry	9.7% (16th)	10.4% (13th)	9.4% (20th)	10.6% (12th)
15	January 26, 2015	I Remember	8.7% (20th)	9.2% (16th)	7.7% (NR)	8.2% (NR)
16	January 27, 2015	To You Again	8.9% (20th)	9.2% (19th)	8.5% (NR)	9.6% (18th)
17	February 2, 2015	Won't You Answer Me?	8.5% (NR)	9.3% (19th)	7.1% (NR)	7.7% (NR)
18	February 3, 2015	Just Like the Others	9.1% (19th)	9.6% (15th)	7.3% (NR)	8.4% (20th)
19	February 9, 2015	I'll Protect You	7.9% (NR)	7.7% (NR)	6.9% (NR)	7.8% (NR)
20	February 10, 2015	Goodbye Healer	9.0% (18th)	9.1% (16th)	8.1% (NR)	8.6% (19th)
Average			8.6%	9.2%	7.6%	8.4%
In the table above, the red numbers represents the highest ratings and the blue numbers represents the lowest ratings.; NR denotes that the drama did not rank in the top 20 daily programs on that date.

== Original soundtrack ==
Healer: Original Sound Track

Soundtrack album by Various Artists
- Released: February 9, 2015
- Genres: Pop, K-pop, soundtrack, R&B
- Labels: Sixteen Media; Kim Jong-hak Productions

No.	Title	Music	Artist	Length
1.	"힐러" (Healer)	Lee Pil-ho & Park Jong-mi	Various Artists	2:36
2.	"Eternal Love"	Lee Sang-joon, Denzil "DR" Remedios, and Ryan Jhun Sewon	Michael Learns to Rock	4:16
3.	"When You Hold Me Tight"		Yael Meyer	3:12
4.	"눈이 하는 말" (What the Eyes Say)		Tei	3:36
5.	"You"		Ben	3:46
6.	"그대 때문에" (Because of You)		J ust	4:09
7.	"지켜줄게" (I Will Protect You)		Ji Chang-wook	4:10
8.	"침묵" (Silence)	Lee Pil-ho & Park Jong-mi	Various Artists	2:40
9.	"Love and Pain"	Im Na-rae	Various Artists	3:30
10.	"코드명 힐러" (Code Name: Healer)	Lee Pil-ho	Various Artists	2:16
11.	"멋있다 힐러" (Super Healer)	Kim Min-woo	Various Artists	2:09
12.	"김문호 기자" (Reporter Kim Moon-ho)	Kim Ji-eun	Various Artists	2:32
13.	"지나간다" (Pass On By)	Im Na-rae	Various Artists	3:15
14.	"세상을 품다" (Embrace the World)	Ok Jeong-yong	Various Artists	3:59
15.	"정후사랑" (Jung-hoo's Love Theme)	Park Jong-mi	Various Artists	3:18
16.	"To Battle"	Kim Min-woo	Various Artists	2:37
17.	"영신이의 꿈" (Young-shin's Dream)	Im Na-rae	Various Artists	2:35
18.	"You Love Me"	Kim Min-woo	Various Artists	2:08
19.	"아픔의 흔적" (A Trace of Pain)	Kim Ji-eun	Various Artists	2:58
20.	"해킹루트" (Hacking Route)	Lee Pil-ho	Various Artists	1:43
21.	"Healing Me"	Im Na-rae	Various Artists	3:18
22.	"Trouble"	Kim Min-woo	Various Artists	3:11
23.	"그들의 운명" (Their Fate)	Kim Ji-eun	Various Artists	3:05
24.	"영원한 기억" (Eternal Memory)		Various Artists	2:53

== Awards and nominations ==
Year	Award	Category	Recipient	Result
2014	KBS Drama Awards	Excellence Award, Actor in a Mid-length Drama	Ji Chang-wook	Nominated
2014	KBS Drama Awards	Excellence Award, Actor in a Mid-length Drama	Yoo Ji-tae	Nominated
2014	KBS Drama Awards	Excellence Award, Actress in a Mid-length Drama	Park Min-young	Won
2014	KBS Drama Awards	Popularity Award, Actor	Ji Chang-wook	Won
2014	KBS Drama Awards	Best Couple Award	Ji Chang-wook and Park Min-young	Won
2015	4th APAN Star Awards	Excellence Award, Actor in a Miniseries	Ji Chang-wook	Nominated
2015	4th APAN Star Awards	Best Supporting Actress	Do Ji-won	Nominated
2016	4th Annual DramaFever Awards	Best Couple	Ji Chang-wook and Park Min-young	Won
2016	4th Annual DramaFever Awards	Best Korean Drama – Melodrama	Healer	Won
