= The Legend (TV series) =

2007 South Korean historical fantasy television series

- Promotional poster for The Legend
- Hangul: 태왕사신기
- Hanja: 太王四神記
- RR: Taewangsasingi
- MR: T'aewangsasin'gi
- Genre: Fantasy; Period drama; Romance
- Written by: Park Kyung-soo; Song Ji-na
- Directed by: Kim Jong-hak; Yoon Sang-ho
- Starring: Bae Yong-joon; Lee Ji-ah; Moon So-ri; Choi Min-soo
- Ending theme: "Love Song for a Thousand Years" by TVXQ
- Composer: Joe Hisaishi
- Country of origin: South Korea
- Original language: Korean
- No. of episodes: 24

Production
- Running time: 60 minutes
- Production companies: TSG Company (joint venture of Kim Jong-hak Productions and SSD)
- Budget: ₩43 billion

Original release
- Network: MBC TV
- Release: September 11 – December 5, 2007

The Legend (Korean: 태왕사신기; lit. 'The Chronicles of the First King and the Four Spirits') is a 2007 South Korean historical fantasy television series, starring Bae Yong-joon, Lee Ji-ah, Moon So-ri and Choi Min-soo. Directed by Kim Jong-hak and written by Song Ji-na, it aired on MBC from September 11 to December 5, 2007, on Wednesdays and Thursdays at 21:55 for 24 episodes.

Loosely based on the legend of Dangun and Gwanggaeto the Great of Goguryeo, the story also adds mythical elements of the Four Symbols depicted in fantasy form as the four guardians who serve the king of Jyushin. Bae was paid ₩250 million per episode, the highest salary to date for a Korean drama actor.

== Synopsis ==
A long time ago, a tribe that respected the tiger and controlled fire called the Ho-jok (Tiger Tribe), ruled the world. They eliminated and assimilated all tribes except the tribe that respected the bear, called the Ung-jok (Bear Tribe). The Tiger Tribe and the Bear Tribe fought, and Hwan-woong could not bear to see so many people getting killed. He brought the three gods of nature; Poong-Baek (백호, the White Tiger), Woonsa (청룡, the Azure Dragon), and Woosa (현무, the Turtle Snake).

He removed the power of fire from the leader of the Tiger Tribe, Kajin, sealed the power into an artifact called the Heart of Jujak (주작, the Vermilion Bird/Phoenix), and gave it to the woman he loved; Sae-oh. However, Kajin was mortally wounded while attacking another tribe, and she seemed to die until Hwan-woong healed her. This event makes Kajin develop love for Hwan-woong. When her tribe declared in a war council they would Hwan-woong take back the power of fire, Kajin then slew her tribe's elders with her own blade. She then escapes from her own tribe in search of Hwan-woong, deciding to become Hwan-woong's woman.

However, Hwan-woong likes Sae-oh and declared his love for her, not knowing that Kajin was watching them secretly when this took place. Kajin was infuriated by this and began reforming the Tiger Tribe and attacked the Bear Tribe. Unfortunately, this was the time when Sae-oh was pregnant, and when she had given birth, the baby was kidnapped by Kajin who offered Sae-oh a deal to trade her baby for the power of fire. When Sae-oh refuses Kajin, Kajin responds by dropping Sae-oh's baby from a cliff, leading to Sae-oh going out of control and releasing the Heuk-Jujak (Black Phoenix), even though Hwan-woong had saved the baby. (Note: Jujak is roughly the equivalent of Phoenix.) Hwan-woong's subordinates, the White Tiger, the Azure Dragon and the Turtle Snake fought the Black Phoenix, but they were no match for it.

Left with no choice, Hwan-woong used his Heavenly Bow to kill Sae-oh, the source of the power of the Black Phoenix, and managed to seal it once again in the heart of the Phoenix. Kajin committed suicide by jumping from the cliff because she now "had no reason to live in this world any more." Hwan-woong sealed the powers of the 'Four Gods' (The Phoenix, White Tiger, Azure Dragon, and the Turtle Snake) in certain artifacts and left them in the care of certain people, telling them that they will wake when the King of Jyushin is born.

Many centuries later, Damdeok, the reincarnation of Hwan-woong, was born. Along with him, the artifacts of the guardians of the King were born. Damdeok met difficulties in becoming the king of Goguryeo, mainly because of Yeon Hogae who mistook Damdeok for the murderer of his mother, and his father who turned the king's parliament against him.

== Cast and characters ==
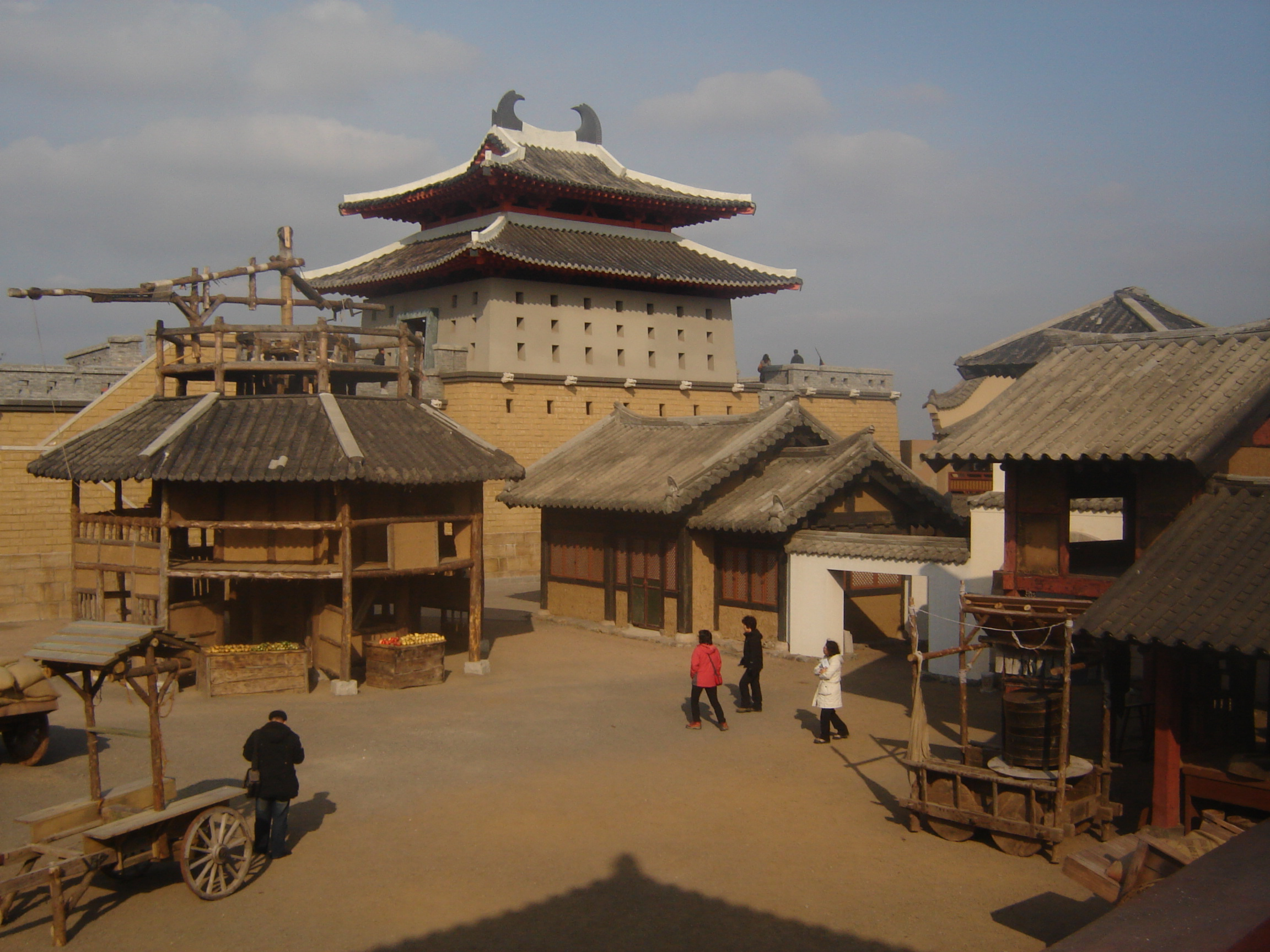
The filming location of the series on Jeju Island

=== Main cast ===
- Bae Yong-joon as Damdeok (later Gwanggaeto the Great of Goguryeo)
  - Yoo Seung-ho as young Damdeok

The prince of Goguryeo and the reincarnation of Hwang-woong. He comes across a girl named Kiha whom he falls in love with. He had grown to a pleasant young man, but in his heart he always suffered because of Hogae's mother who had committed suicide, causing Hogae to believe that Damdeok killed her. He was later found to be the destined King of Jyushin. In order to protect him before he becomes the king, he was asked to not show his true self to anyone, where in he pretended that he has no skills, especially in fighting. The image he showed to everyone was not hidden just by him and his father but he also trusted Kiha about him being a good fighter. It also prevented him from being harmed by people who wanted the throne, who didn't see him as a threat. However, he proves himself to be an excellent fighter and schemer. He wants to unite the world as a brother, avoiding killing and instead providing love for his future people. At the end of the series, he realizes that the task of the King of Jyushin was to answer the gods whether humans needed their help to continue surviving. The answer he told the gods was that he should return the powers and that humans could carry on by themselves. Having said that, he returned to the heavens, leaving behind Sujini whom he finally realizes thas he has feelings for (although he still had unresolved feelings for Kiha) and kiha's and his son.

- Lee Ji-ah as Sujini
  - Shim Eun-kyung as young Sujini

The mistress of the Phoenix and the reincarnation of Sae-Oh. When she was just a little baby, she was hidden in a pot of beans by her sister, Kiha, to protect her from danger. She was then found by some men of the Geomul village, who saw a phoenix sign on her forehead and thought she was the Black Phoenix. The leader was about to kill her, however Hyeon-go denied having seen the Black Phoenix sign, but a Red Phoenix instead. Sujini was raised by Hyeon-go and considers him as her teacher. Growing up in a male tribe, she developed boyish traits, and loves money, which she uses to buy wine. She met Damdeok by chance one day while she was getting in somewhat little trouble and Damdeok helped her. Their relationship was strengthened over time. Sujini also gave a big contribution helping Damdeok to recognize himself as the king of Jyushin (because of the conflict with Hogae); she always tagged along with him, even onto the battlefield. Sujini was very good at archery. When she discovered that she was the one that would release the Black Phoenix she chose to live alone; she thus moved away without Damdeok's knowledge and brought up the son of Damdeok and her sister. After nine years, they met again, but Damdeok had by then realized she was the one he truly loved. She is the mistress of the Red Phoenix, the ruler of the South and the guardian of the fire, whose heavenly artifact is a large red gem orb. It awakens when the King of Jyushin feels burning passion in his heart.

- Moon So-ri as Seo Kiha
  - Park Eun-bin as teenage Kiha
  - Kim Eun-seo as 5-year-old Kiha

The reincarnation of Kajin, the Mistress of the Earth and first love of Damdeok. She was born as a noble in Sabi Castle just like her sister, Sujini. On the day of the arrival of the night of the Jyushin star, the forces of Hwacheon struck the province and killed everyone in sight. Kiha hid Sujini in a pot of beans before fainting in the smoke caused by the fire that the Hwacheon forces started. While unconscious, the heart of the Phoenix exploded in a form of watery energy, extinguishing the fire to save her and her sister. She was discovered shortly afterwards by someone from Hwacheon, the master-of-fights of Hwacheon, and taken to the base of Hwacheon clan. The Daejangro mistaken her as the reincarnation of Kajin and branded her to control her, while using her power of the Phoenix to regain his youth. She was trained in martial arts by Saryang, who developed an elder-brotherly feeling for her and even went against Hwacheon to help her. She met Damdeok one night in the royal library and began to fall for him. Their relationship was going well, until the day that Damdeok's father staged his death that made it seemed that Kiha assassinated him to protect Damdeok. She became a cold person since, especially after seeing Damdeok having a good time with Sujini. She came to think herself to have been 'used'. Later finding that she was pregnant, she decided to reform the whole of Goguryeo for her child. She went as far as deciding Hogae to be suitable for the father for her child even though her love for Damdeok never disappeared. At the end of the series, Sujini realized that Kiha has the power of the Black Phoenix.

- Oh Kwang-rok as Hyeon-go
  - Oh Seung-yoon as young Hyeon-go

The leader of the Geomul village, he is slightly irresponsible and does not act his age enough. Sure enough, he cheated customers by claiming to be an astrologer. He is the leader of the masters of the Four Gods, and is therefore to identify the King of Jyushin and serve him. Damdeok calls him his 'teacher' and asks him to teach him the basics of a king. He carries a stick given to him when he was appointed as the leader of Geomul. This stick is the Heavenly Artifact of the Turtle-Snake, the ruler of the North and the guardian of the rain, that awakens when the King of Jyushin feels dark rage in his heart: when it awakens, the time stops along with everything other than its master and the King of Jyushin, enabling the leader of the Four Guardians to identify the King.

- Choi Min-soo as Daejangro

"Leader" of Hwacheon Clan

- Yoon Tae-young as Yeon Hogae
  - Kim Ho-young as young Hogae

Damdeok's cousin and rival. At first he was very open and pleasant towards Damdeok, but after his mother's death he resolved to take revenge. This was combined with his character changing devastatingly to a cold, cool type from a warm, pleasant person. He had been winning many battles as early as his teens, and grew to a powerful warrior. He joined Hwacheon to kill Damdeok. He was killed by Damdeok in the last battle.

- Park Sang-won as Yeon Garyo

Hogae's father.

- Lee Phillip as Cheoro
  - Lee Hyun-woo as young Cheoro

He became the lord of the Gwanmi fortress of Baekjae at a mere ten years of age when his father infused Cheoro with the symbol of the Blue Dragon. Though this made him much more powerful, Cheoro's skin became covered in a blue bark-like substance. Damdeok was able to remove the artifact, and Cheoro began to serve under him. He is very silent, loves being with trees and forests, and it is implied that he loves Sujini, as his previous incarnation as the Blue Dragon loved Sae-oh. He fights with a spear and is the guardian of the Blue Dragon, the ruler of the East and the guardian of the clouds, whose heavenly artifact is a bluish stone that looks slightly like a shellfish. It is said to activate when the King of Jyushin feels cold purpose in his heart. When activated, it can weaken the power of the wielder of fire and speed the healing of its master when in physical contact with him.

- Park Sung-woong as Jumuchi

The leader of the Talgal Mercenaries, he fights with an axe. He served under Damdeok under the promise that Jumuchi's people will have their land returned to them. His three rules to be hired are not to attack anyone from the rear, not harm women, children, or the elderly, and not accept a task if he dislikes the client's face. Despite this he did not betray Damdeok even risking his life for him. He is the guardian of the White Tiger, the ruler of the West and the guardian of the winds, which awakens when the King of Jyushin feels innocent courage in his heart. Its heavenly artifact is a white twisted piece of metal.

- Park Seong-min as Saryang

The right-hand man of Daejangro of the Hwacheon. He has long gray hair and a mask that obscures 1/3 of his face. He has ninja like attributes such as great speed and proficiency with shurikens and blades. He is a caretaker for Kiha when she was younger, and appears to be one of the few people who truly care for her. He ultimately betrays the Hwacheon clan at Kiha's request to be on her side, and is used as a shield by Daejangro when Kiha attempted to kill him, dying before Kiha's eyes.

=== Supporting cast ===
- Park Jung-hak as General Go Woo-cheung
- Jang Hang-sun as Heukgae
- Kim Hyuk as Dalgu
- Kim Seok as Dalgu's friend
- Shin Eun-jung as Dalbi
- Ha Ji-young as Personal Writer
- Kim Mi-kyung as Bason
- Min Ji-oh as Soidooroo
- Baek Jae-jin as Buldeul
- Hong Kyung-yeon as Dae Shin-kwan
- Jung Yoon-seok as Ahjik
- Lee Da-hee as Gakdan
- Song Kwi-hyun as Jo Joo-do
- Woo Hyun as wheat seller
- Kim Sun-kyung as Hogae's mother
- Dokgo Young-jae as King Gogugyang
- Bae Yong-joon as Hwan-woong

Son of the god in the heavenly world, he brought three Guardians of the world: the Blue Dragon, the White Tiger and the Turtle-Snake. His heavenly artifact is the Cheongung, which normally takes the form of a fancy cylinder and enlarges to form a glowing white bow. It is said to be able to either kill or give life to anyone it shoots, and its destruction means the death of the King of Jyushin and the unsummoning of the heavenly power. Before the coming of the King of Jyushin, it was sealed inside a royal sword named Chumoshin, which should release the seal when the heart of the King of Jyushin was introduced to it: that is, when it were to impale his heart. When this was done, it exploded in bright light and disintegrated to fine ash-like mystic powder, revealing the Cheongung in it.

- Lee Ji-ah as Sae-oh
- Moon So-ri as Kajin

== Ratings ==
Date	Episode	Nationwide	Seoul
2007-09-10	1st Special	14.1% (6th)	14.5% (6th)
2007-09-11	1	20.4% (3rd)	21.6% (3rd)
2007-09-12	2	26.9% (1st)	27.7% (1st)
2007-09-13	3	26.9% (1st)	28.3% (1st)
2007-09-19	4	31.7% (1st)	33.3% (1st)
2007-09-20	5	31.5% (1st)	33.1% (1st)
2007-09-26	6	23.4% (2nd)	25.3% (1st)
2007-09-27	7	30.9% (1st)	33.0% (1st)
2007-10-10	8	25.9% (2nd)	26.4% (2nd)
2007-10-11	9	28.2% (2nd)	29.3% (1st)
2007-10-17	10	27.5% (2nd)	28.6% (1st)
2007-10-18	11	28.3% (2nd)	29.7% (1st)
2007-10-24	12	29.6% (2nd)	30.2% (1st)
2007-10-25	13	29.1% (2nd)	30.4% (1st)
2007-10-31	14	27.9% (2nd)	29.0% (1st)
2007-11-01	15	31.9% (1st)	33.2% (1st)
2007-11-07	16	30.0% (2nd)	31.0% (1st)
2007-11-08	17	30.4% (2nd)	31.9% (1st)
2007-11-14	18	30.4% (2nd)	31.5% (1st)
2007-11-15	19	31.6% (2nd)	32.8% (1st)
2007-11-21	20	30.4% (2nd)	32.1% (1st)
2007-11-22	21	32.3% (2nd)	33.4% (1st)
2007-11-28	22	31.6% (2nd)	32.9% (1st)
2007-11-29	23	33.0% (2nd)	34.6% (1st)
2007-12-05	24	35.7% (1st)	37.0% (1st)
2007-12-06	2nd Special	16.9% (2nd)	16.0% (2nd)
Average		29.4%	30.7%

Source: TNS Media Korea

== Awards and nominations ==
Year	Award	Category	Recipient	Result
2007	MBC Drama Awards	Grand Prize (Daesang)	Bae Yong-joon	Won
2007	MBC Drama Awards	Top Excellence Award, Actor	Choi Min-soo	Nominated
2007	MBC Drama Awards	Top Excellence Award, Actor	Bae Yong-joon	Nominated
2007	MBC Drama Awards	Golden Acting Award, Actor in a Historical Drama	Choi Min-soo	Won
2007	MBC Drama Awards	Best New Actor	Lee Phillip	Nominated
2007	MBC Drama Awards	Best New Actress	Lee Ji-ah	Won
2007	MBC Drama Awards	Viewer's Favorite Drama of the Year	The Legend	Won
2007	MBC Drama Awards	Popularity Award, Actor	Bae Yong-joon	Won
2007	MBC Drama Awards	Popularity Award, Actor	Choi Min-soo	Nominated
2007	MBC Drama Awards	Popularity Award, Actress	Lee Ji-ah	Won
2007	MBC Drama Awards	Best Couple Award	Bae Yong-joon and Lee Ji-ah	Won
2008	44th Baeksang Arts Awards	Best Drama	The Legend	Nominated
2008	44th Baeksang Arts Awards	Best Actor (TV)	Bae Yong-joon	Nominated
2008	44th Baeksang Arts Awards	Best New Actor (TV)	Lee Phillip	Nominated
2008	44th Baeksang Arts Awards	Best New Actress (TV)	Lee Ji-ah	Won
2008	2nd Korea Drama Awards	Best Drama	The Legend	Nominated
2008	2nd Korea Drama Awards	Hallyu Achievement Award	Bae Yong-joon	Won

== Adaptations ==
A novelization written by Kim Chang-gyu became a bestseller, and a graphic novel version by manga artist Riyoko Ikeda was also released.

The series was adapted into a musical by the Japanese Takarazuka Revue. It was staged in early 2009 by the Flower Troupe, and starred Sei Matobu and Ayane Sakurano. Following the success of the first run, Version II of the musical was staged in late June 2009 by the Star Troupe, starring Reon Yuzuki and Nene Yumesaki.
