= 2007 MBC Drama Awards =

26th edition of award ceremony

- Date: December 30, 2007
- Hosted by: Shin Dong-yup; Hyun Young

Highlights
- Grand Prize (Daesang): Bae Yong-joon

Television coverage
- Network: MBC

The 2007 MBC Drama Awards (Korean: MBC 연기대상) is a ceremony honoring the outstanding achievement in television on the Munhwa Broadcasting Corporation (MBC) network for the year of 2007. It was held on December 30, 2007 and hosted by Shin Dong-yup and Hyun Young.

== Nominations and winners ==
(Winners denoted in bold)

Grand Prize (Daesang)
**Bae Yong-joon** – **The Legend**
Top Excellence Award, Actor	Top Excellence Award, Actress
**Kim Myung-min** – **Behind the White Tower**; **Lee Seo-jin** – **Yi San**; Bae Yong-joon – The Legend; Choi Min-soo – The Legend	**Gong Hyo-jin** – **Thank You**; **Yoon Eun-hye** – **Coffee Prince**; Choi Jin-sil – Bad Woman, Good Woman; Go Hyun-jung – H.I.T
Excellence Award, Actor	Excellence Award, Actress
**Gong Yoo** – **Coffee Prince**; **Lee Joon-gi** – **Time Between Dog and Wolf**; Jang Hyuk – Thank You; Lee Sun-kyun – Coffee Prince	**Han Ji-min** – **Yi San**; **Nam Sang-mi** – **Time Between Dog and Wolf**; Chae Jung-an – Coffee Prince; Wang Hee-ji – Ahyeon-dong Madam
Golden Acting Award, Actor in a Historical Drama	Golden Acting Award, Actress in a Historical Drama
**Choi Min-soo** – **The Legend**; **Lee Soon-jae** – **Yi San**	
Golden Acting Award, Actor in a Miniseries	Golden Acting Award, Actress in a Miniseries
**Jang Hyuk** – **Thank You**; **Lee Sun-kyun** – **Behind the White Tower**	
Golden Acting Award, Actor in a Serial Drama	Golden Acting Award, Actress in a Serial Drama
	**Choi Myung-gil** – **By My Side**; **Lee Yoon-ji** – **By My Side**
Golden Acting Award, Veteran Actor	Golden Acting Award, Veteran Actress
**Kim Byung-ki** – **Ahyeon-dong Madam**	**Park Won-sook** – **Winter Bird**
Best New Actor	Best New Actress
**Han Sang-jin** – **Behind the White Tower**, **Yi San**; **Kim Min-sung** – **Ahyeon-dong Madam**; Lee Eon – Coffee Prince; Lee Phillip – The Legend	**Lee Ha-na** – **Merry Mary**; **Lee Ji-ah** – **The Legend**; Go Eun-mi – Even So Love; Park Shin-hye – Kimcheed Radish Cubes
Best Young Actor	Best Young Actress
**Park Ji-bin** – **Yi San**	**Seo Shin-ae** – **Thank You**
PD Award	Writer of the Year
**Kim Chang-wan** – **Coffee Prince**, **Behind the White Tower**	**Han Sook-ja** – **MBC Special**; **Kim Yi-young** – **Yi San**
Popularity Award, Actor	Popularity Award, Actress
**Bae Yong-joon** – **The Legend**; Choi Min-soo – The Legend; Gong Yoo – Coffee Prince; Jang Hyuk – Thank You; Kim Myung-min – Behind the White Tower; Lee Joon-gi – Time Between Dog and Wolf; Lee Seo-jin – Yi San	**Lee Ji-ah** – **The Legend**; Choi Ji-woo – Air City; Choi Jin-sil – Bad Woman, Good Woman; Go Hyun-jung – H.I.T; Gong Hyo-jin – Thank You; Han Ji-min – Yi San; Yoon Eun-hye – Coffee Prince
Best Couple Award	Viewer's Favorite Drama of the Year
**Bae Yong-joon** and **Lee Ji-ah** – **The Legend**; Gong Yoo and Yoon Eun-hye – Coffee Prince; Jang Hyuk and Gong Hyo-jin – Thank You; Ji Hyun-woo and Lee Ha-na – Merry Mary; Lee Seo-jin and Han Ji-min – Yi San; Lee Sun-kyun and Chae Jung-an – Coffee Prince	**The Legend**; Coffee Prince; Behind the White Tower; Yi San
Best TV Host / Special Award for TV MC	Best TV Voice Actor/Actress
**Kim Sung-hwan** – **해피 실버 고향은 지금**; **Im Ye-jin** – **Good Day**	**Choi Won-hyeong** – **CSI: NY**; **Eom Hyeon-jeong** – **CSI: Miami**
Special Award in TV, Producer	Family Award
**Jung In**	**Kimcheed Radish Cubes**
Top Excellence Award in Radio	Excellence Award in Radio
**Choi Yoo-ra** – **Now Is the Era of Radio**	**Park Jung-ah** – **On a Starry Night**; **Sung Si-kyung** – **Blue Nights with Sung Si-kyung**
Best Newcomer in Radio	Best Writer in Radio
**Jo Young-nam** – **Now Is the Era of Radio**	**Kim Sung** – **싱글벙글 쇼**
Special Award in Radio	Achievement Award
**Kim Yoo-jung** – **Reporter, Sohn Suk-hee's Focus**; **Yoon Young-wook** – **Editorial writer, 논설위원, 세계는 그리고 우리는**	**Jung Han-heon** – **MBC Talent Department**; **CG team** – **The Legend**; **Kim Hye-kyung** – **Designer, Standard FM and Golden Mau**
