= Park Yong-ha =

South Korean actor and singer (1977–2010)

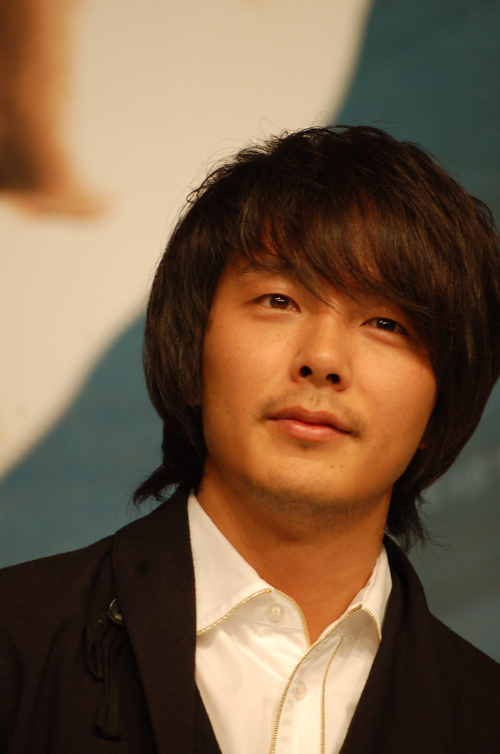
- Park in 2009
- Born: 박용하; August 12, 1977; Seoul, South Korea
- Died: June 30, 2010 (aged 32); Seoul, South Korea
- Occupations: Singer; actor
- Musical career
- Genres: Pop; K-Pop; J-Pop
- Years active: 1994–2010
- Label: Pony Canyon (Japan)

Korean name
- Hangul: 박용하
- Hanja: 朴容夏
- RR: Bak Yongha
- MR: Pak Yongha

Park Yong-ha (Korean: 박용하, August 12, 1977 – June 30, 2010) was a South Korean actor and singer.

== Career ==
At seventeen, Park was noted for his acting and musical skills, as well as his good looks which earned him popularity with fans. After his debut in MBC drama Theme Theater (1994), Park appeared in a range of TV dramas and films. In 2002, Park co-starred in Winter Sonata with Bae Yong-joon and Choi Ji-woo, which brought him fame in Japan.

=== Music ===
As a singer, Park was the "mysterious" voice behind Just For Yesterday, the hit theme song of SBS drama All In, which starred Lee Byung-hun and Song Hye-kyo.

Park released various Japanese albums in Japan and held successful concerts both in Japan and Korea.

Park sang the theme songs of SBS drama On Air in 2008. The Japanese version of the theme songs was his 6th single album Behind Love. Behind Love, released on July 23, 2008, was ranked as the third top single album on Oricon, Japan's premier daily album chart. His next single album, Say Goodbye, and full-length album, Love, were released in November 2008 and both were ranked on Oricon within top 10.

=== Film and television ===
Park starred in SBS drama On Air as a drama PD, Kyoung-min Lee, in 2008 and on Mnet Japan from July 30, 2008. He and co-star Song Yun-ah visited Japan to promote the series in a showcase attend by 800 VIP guests at Toho Cinema in Roppongi Hills, Tokyo. He also starred in the movie The Scam as an individual investor (small-time investor) Hyun-soo Kang. The Scam was released on February 12, 2009. He was cast in the drama, The Slingshot, acting as the character Kim Shin, which started broadcasting on KBS2 on April 6, 2009.

== Death ==
Park was found dead by his mother at 5:30 am June 30, 2010 at his home in Nonhyeon-dong, Seoul, hanging from a camcorder charger cable after an apparent suicide.

It was also revealed in reports that the last person they spoke to on the phone before passing away was Kim Jae-joong.

== Discography ==
=== Studio albums ===
Title	Album details	Peak chart positions	
Title	Album details	JPN	KOR
Kibyol (기별)	Released: January 24, 2003 (KOR); Label: IO Music	—	25 (Note: Kibyol charted at number 25 on the monthly Recording Industry Association of Korea album chart.)
Kibyol (期別)	Released: June 16, 2004 (JPN); Label: Pony Canyon	8	—
Fiction	Released: December 15, 2004 (JPN); Label: Pony Canyon	10	—
Sometime	Released: July 20, 2005 (JPN); Label: Pony Canyon	14	—
Will Be There...	Released: February 8, 2006 (JPN); Label: Pony Canyon	7	—
Love	Released: November 26, 2008 (JPN); Label: Pony Canyon	24	—
Once in a Summer	Released: July 29, 2009 (JPN); Label: Pony Canyon	14	—
Stars	Released: June 9, 2010 (JPN); Label: Pony Canyon	16	—

=== Compilation albums ===
Title	Album details	Peak chart positions	
Title	Album details	JPN	KOR
Present	Released: June 27, 2007 (JPN); Label: Pony Canyon	18	—
The Memory	Released: October 7, 2010 (KOR); Label: Genie Music	—	14
Park Yong Ha in 1095’s	Released: December 15, 2010 (JPN); Label: Pony Canyon	14	—
Park Yong Ha in 1107’s	Released: December 15, 2010 (JPN); Label: Pony Canyon	19	—
Song For You	Released: June 18, 2014 (JPN); Label: Pony Canyon	46	—

=== Singles ===
Title	Year	Peak chart positions	Album
Title	Year	JPN	Album
"Kajimaseyo" (カジマセヨ)	2004	10	Fiction
"Truth / Hohoemi wo Ageyou" (ほゝえみをあげよう)	2005	7	Non-album singles
"Kimi ga Saikou!" (君が最高!)	2006	6	Non-album singles
"Boku no Page wo Mekureba" (僕の頁をめくれば)	2007	12	Non-album singles
"Eien" (永遠)	2007	6	Non-album singles
"Behind Love ~ Kataomoi" (片思い)	2008	7	Love
"Say Goodbye"	2008	14	Love
"Saiai no Hito" (最愛のひと)	2009	11	Stars
"One Love ~Egao de Afureru You ni~" (笑顔であふれるように)	2010	17	Stars

=== Soundtrack appearances ===
Title	Year	Album
"Only For You" (너 하나만을 위해)	2001	Guardian Angel OST
"Narration"	2002	Loving You OST
"Love Montage" (with Eugene)	2002	Loving You OST
"Sarang...geu cheonneukkim" (사랑...그 첫느낌) (with Eugene)	2002	Loving You OST
"Hyeogui tema" (혁의 테마)	2002	Loving You OST
"Like the First Day" (처음 그 날처럼)	2003	All In OST
"Bad Love" (외사랑)	2008	On Air OST
"Thankful Person" (고마운 사람)	2008	On Air OST
"Money" (with Cho PD)	2009	The Scam OST

== Filmography ==
=== Film ===
- The Scam (2009)
- Although It is Hateful Again 2002 (2002)
- If It Snows on Christmas (1998)

=== TV drama ===
- The Slingshot (2009)
- On Air (2008)
- Tokyo Wankei (2004)
- Loving You (2002)
- Winter Sonata (2002)
- Sunflower (2000)
- Famous Woman, Somun (2001)
- Snowflakes (2001)
- More Than Love
- See and See Again (1998)
- What A Tough Woman (1997)

== Awards and nominations ==
Award ceremony	Year	Category	Nominee/work	Result	Ref.
Japan Gold Disc Award	2005	New Artist of the Year – Western Music Category	Park Yong-ha	Won	
Japan Gold Disc Award	2006	Song of the Year – Western Music Category	"Truth / Hohoemi wo Ageyou"	Won	
Japan Gold Disc Award	2006	Japan-Korea Friendship Special Award	Park Yong-ha	Won	
Japan Gold Disc Award	2007	Best Asian Artist	Park Yong-ha	Won	
Japan Gold Disc Award	2008	Best Asian Artist	Park Yong-ha	Won	
KBS Drama Awards	2002	Excellence Award, Actor	Winter Sonata	Won	
KBS Drama Awards	2009	Excellence Award – Actor in a Mid-length Drama	The Slingshot	Nominated	
MBC Drama Awards	1998	Best New Actor	See and See Again	Won	
Baeksang Arts Awards	2009	Best Actor – Television	On Air	Nominated	
Mnet 20's Choice Awards	2008	Hot Global Star	Park Yong-ha	Won	
Mnet Music Video Festival	2003	Best New Male Artist	"Kibyol"	Nominated	
SBS Drama Awards	2008	Excellence Award – Actor in a Drama Special	On Air	Won	
SBS Drama Awards	2008	Top 10 Stars	On Air	Won	
SBS Drama Awards	2008	Netizen Popularity Award	On Air	Nominated	
SBS Drama Awards	2008	Best Couple	On Air (with Song Yoon-ah)	Nominated	
Seoul International Drama Awards	2009	Best Actor	The Slingshot	Nominated	
Seoul Music Awards	2004	Hallyu Award	Park Yong-ha	Won	
