= Sandglass (TV series) =

South Korean television series

- DVD cover
- Also known as: The Hourglass
- Hangul: 모래시계
- Hanja: 모래時計
- Lit.: Hourglass
- RR: Moraesigye
- MR: Moraesigye
- Genre: Drama
- Written by: Song Ji-na
- Directed by: Kim Jong-hak
- Starring: Choi Min-soo; Go Hyun-jung; Park Sang-won; Lee Jung-jae
- Music by: Choi Kyung-sik
- Country of origin: South Korea
- Original language: Korean
- No. of episodes: 24

Production
- Production companies: Jcom; SBS Production

Original release
- Network: SBS TV
- Release: January 9 – February 16, 1995

Sandglass (Korean: 모래시계) is a 1995 South Korean television series. It is one of the highest-rated Korean dramas in history, and is also considered one of the most significant. Written by Song Ji-na, directed by Kim Jong-hak and produced by their own company Jcom, it aired on SBS in 1995 in 24 episodes.

A depiction of the tragic relationship among three friends affected by the political and civilian oppression of 1970s and 1980s Korea, the series mixed politics, melodrama, and action. It recorded a peak rating of 64.5%, the fourth highest of all time, and launched its leading trio of Choi Min-soo, Go Hyun-jung, and Park Sang-won into stardom. Its reenactment of the Gwangju Uprising (interspersed with archival video footage) has been called one of the most realistic and memorable moments in Korean TV history. It also depicts the YH incident and October Restoration.

== Synopsis ==
Sandglass is the story of two men whose friendship is tested through the 1970s and 80s, one of Korea's most volatile periods. Park Tae-soo (Choi Min-soo), tough and loyal, grows up to become a gangster and his pal Kang Woo-suk (Park Sang-won), smart with firm moral values, becomes a prosecutor. Yoon Hye-rin (Go Hyun-jung), a beautiful and spirited daughter of a wealthy casino owner, is a classmate of Woo-suk in college. She is introduced to Tae-soo via Woo-suk and they fall in love.

A notable aspect of this series is its depiction of the 1980 Gwangju Democratization Movement, an event during which Gen. Chun Doo-hwan, head of the military junta that took over the country after the assassination of President Park Chung Hee, sent paratroopers into Gwangju to violently crack down the uprising, resulting in a massacre of hundreds of civilians. A taboo subject during the airing of the series, the violent scenes (based on individual accounts) resulted in shock and grief for the public at that time. In the mid-90s, South Korea had not come to terms with what happened after the government muzzled free speech. "Sandglass" inspired a visible output of films dealing with the subject such as A Petal (1996) and Peppermint Candy (2000). It even influenced the prosecution of ex-President Chun Doo-hwan responsible for the massacre, resulting in his conviction decades after the incident.

== Cast ==
- Choi Min-soo as Park Tae-soo
- Go Hyun-jung as Yoon Hye-rin
- Park Sang-won as Kang Woo-suk
- Lee Jung-jae as Baek Jae-hee
- Park Geun-hyung as President Yoon, Hye-rin's father
- Jung Sung-mo as Lee Jong-do
- Jo Min-su as Woo-suk's wife
- Lee Seung-yeon as Reporter Shin
- Kim Jong-gyul as Lawyer Min
- Jo Kyung-hwan
- Kim Byung-ki as Kang Dong-hwan
- Jo Hyung-ki
- Kim In-moon as Tae-soo's father
- Jang Hang-sun
- Kim Young-ae as Tae-soo's mother
- Im Hyun-sik as assistant prosecutor
- Hwang Jang-lee
- Kim Jung-hyun
- Hong Kyung-in
- Lee Hee-do
- Maeng Sang-hoon
- Lee Doo-il
- Park Young-ji
- Son Hyun-joo
- Jung Myung-hwan
- Kim Jung-hak
- Han Kyung-sun
- Choi Jae-ho
- Kim Myung-gook
- Do Yong-gook
- Park Sang-jo

== Ratings ==
- In the table below, the blue numbers represent the lowest ratings and the red numbers represent the highest ratings.

Episode	Seoul	Nationwide
1	30.7%	29.8%
2	32.5%	34.1%
3	36.6%	35.9%
4	37.8%	36.9%
5	40.3%	40.1%
6	41.5%	41.7%
7	43.2%	43.3%
8	43.8%	43.9%
9	44.1%	44.0%
10	45.9%	46.5%
11	47.0%	47.9%
12	48.3%	48.7%
13	48.5%	48.9%
14	56.6%	55.7%
15	59.1%	59.6%
16	60.0%	60.3%
17	60.1%	60.2%
18	60.2%	60.1%
19	60.3%	61.6%
20	60.6%	64.1%
21	63.4%	64.7%
22	63.3%	64.4%
23	63.9%	62.1%
24	64.5%	64.3%
Average	50.5%	50.8%

== Reception ==
Traffic was visibly lighter and pubs reported slow business as government officials, students and office workers alike headed home early to watch Sandglass every Monday through Thursday evenings.

Sandglass remains one of the highest-rated TV series in Korean broadcasting history (by single episode viewership rating):

1. 그대 그리고 나 – You and I (66.9% / 1998-04-26 / MBC)
2. 첫사랑 – First Love (65.8% / 1997-04-20 / KBS2)
3. 사랑이 뭐길래 – What is Love? (64.9% / 1992-05-24 / MBC)
4. 모래시계 – Sandglass (64.5% / 1995-02-06 / SBS)
5. 허준 – Hur Jun (63.5% / 2000-06-27 / MBC)
6. 젊은이의 양지 – Youth's Sunny Place (62.7% / 1995-11-12 / KBS2)
7. 아들과 딸 – Son and Daughter (61.1% / 1993-03-21 / MBC)
8. 태조왕건 – Taejo Wang Geon (60.2% / 2001-05-20 / KBS1)
9. 여명의 눈동자 – Eyes of Dawn (58.4% / 1992-02-06 / MBC)
10. 대장금 – Dae Jang Geum (57.8% / 2004-03-23 / MBC)

A song, titled "Zhuravli" ("Crane"), by a Russian singer Joseph Kobzon was featured in the series. Although many Koreans did not understand the lyrics, it is still one of the most widely recognized song in Korea thanks to the show's popularity. The song actually mourns the Soviet soldiers killed while defending their homeland and who later became cranes. The lyrics blend well with the theme of the show since one of the major plot devices of the show, the Gwangju Massacre, commemorates the dead who were caught in the middle of the tragedy.

== Accolades ==
Year	Award	Category	Recipient	Result
1995	31st Baeksang Arts Awards	Daesang (Grand Prize)	Sandglass	Won
1995	31st Baeksang Arts Awards	Best Drama	Sandglass	Won
1995	31st Baeksang Arts Awards	Best Director (TV)	Kim Jong-hak	Won
1995	31st Baeksang Arts Awards	Best Screenplay (TV)	Song Ji-na	Won
1995	31st Baeksang Arts Awards	Best Actor (TV)	Choi Min-soo	Won
1995	31st Baeksang Arts Awards	Best New Actor (TV)	Lee Jung-jae	Won
1995	22nd Korean Broadcasting Awards	Best Drama	Sandglass	Won
1995	22nd Korean Broadcasting Awards	Best Writer	Song Ji-na	Won
1995	22nd Korean Broadcasting Awards	Best Actor	Choi Min-soo	Won
1995	3rd SBS Drama Awards	Daesang (Grand Prize)	Choi Min-soo	Won
1995	3rd SBS Drama Awards	Top Excellence Award, Actor	Park Sang-won	Won
1995	3rd SBS Drama Awards	Best New Actor	Lee Jung-jae	Won
1996	8th Producers Association Award	Daesang (Grand Prize)	Sandglass	Won
1996	8th Producers Association Award	Best Drama	Sandglass	Won

== Reruns ==
As a tribute to the late director Kim Jong-hak (who died on July 23, 2013), cable subsidiary SBS Plus aired reruns of Sandglass from July 29 to August 15, 2013, at 20:40 every Monday, Tuesday, Wednesday and Thursday, with two consecutive episodes per night. This was exactly how the show was originally broadcast in 1995.
