= Eyes of Dawn =

South Korean television series

- Also known as: Years of Upheaval
- Hangul: 여명의 눈동자
- Hanja: 黎明의 눈瞳子
- RR: Yeomyeongui nundongja
- MR: Yŏmyŏngŭi nuntongja
- Genre: Epic; Period drama; Drama; Romance
- Based on: Eyes of Dawn by Kim Seong-jong
- Written by: Song Ji-na
- Directed by: Kim Jong-hak
- Starring: Chae Shi-ra; Park Sang-won; Choi Jae-sung
- Opening theme: 여는 곡 Main title Love Theme
- Ending theme: 닫는 곡 End Title Love Theme
- Composer: Choi Gyeong-sik
- Country of origin: South Korea
- Original language: Korean
- No. of episodes: 36

Production
- Executive producer: Lee Kang-hoon
- Producer: Choi Jong-soo
- Production locations: South Korea; Harbin; Philippines
- Cinematography: Im Yi-rang; Han Suk-dong; Seo Deuk-won; Jo Su-hyeon
- Editor: Jo In-hyeong
- Running time: 50 minutes

Original release
- Network: MBC TV
- Release: October 7, 1991 – February 6, 1992

Eyes of Dawn (Korean: 여명의 눈동자) is a South Korean television series starring Chae Shi-ra, Park Sang-won and Choi Jae-sung. Directed by Kim Jong-hak and written by Song Ji-na based on the 10-volume novel of the same name by Kim Seong-jong (published in 1981), the story spans the years from the Japanese colonial period to World War II, Korea's liberation and the Korean War.

With a budget of ₩7.2 billion, overseas shoots in China and the Philippines, over 270 actors and 21,000 extras, Eyes of Dawn was one of the first Korean dramas to be shot in its entirety before broadcast and the largest scale Korean television production of its time. It aired on MBC from October 7, 1991, to February 6, 1992, for 36 episodes, and reached a peak viewership rating of 58.4%, making it the 9th highest-rated Korean drama of all time. In 1992, MBC sold Eyes of Dawn to the Turkish Radio and Television Corporation, becoming the first Korean drama exported to a European country.

== Cast ==
- Chae Shi-ra as Yoon Yeo-ok
- Park Sang-won as Jang Ha-rim
- Choi Jae-sung as Choi Dae-chi
- Choi Bool-am as Yoon Hong-chul, Yeo-ok's father
- Park Geun-hyung as Choi Du-il (Suzuki)
- Lee Jung-gil as Kim Ki-mun
- Jang Hang-sun as OOE Oh Jang
- Park In-hwan as Private Gu Bo-da
- Im Hyun-sik as Hwang Sung-chul
- Kim Heung-ki as Daewi Mida Yoshinori
- Han Cha-dol as Choi Dae-woon, Dae-chi and Yeo-ok's son
- Oh Yeon-soo as Bong-soon
- Go Hyun-jung as Ahn Myeong-ji
- Choi Hyun-mi as Lee Kyeong-ae
- Shim Yang-hong as Lawyer Park Chang-seok
- Nam Sung-hoon as Baek In-soo
- Lee Chang-hwan as President Syngman Rhee
- Min Ji-hwan as Unit 731 director Shirō Ishii
- Kim Ki-joo as 15th Army commander Renya Mutaguchi
- Kim Du-sam as "Maruta" military police
- Kim Dong-hyun as Jang Kyung-rim, Ha-rim's older brother
- Kim So-won as Ha-rim and Kyung-rim's mother
- Ahn Hye-sook as Kyung-rim's wife
- Cheon Woon as General Hwang
- Kim In-moon as Lee Min-seob
- Gook Jeong-hwan as Kim Deok-jae
- Shin Dong-hoon as Leader
- Park Yong-soo as Lee Joo-hwan
- Byun Hee-bong as Park Chun-geum
- Hong Sung-min as Kwak Chun-bu
- Lee Won-jae as Jo Gwi-mun
- Kim Young-ok as Elder Kim
- Kim Ji-young as Miss Ahn
- Choi Sang-hoon as General Kim
- Chung Jin as Go Chang-dae
- Nam Po-dong as Bu Tae-jong
- Yoo Seung-bong as Kim Jeong-sik
- Lee Dae-ro as Ahn Jae-hong
- Choi Myung-soo as Jo Byung-ok
- Park Woong as Noh Il-young
- Lee Hyo-jung as Kim Ik-ryul
- Choi Byung-hak as Chief of police Moon
- Park Young-ji as Detective Oh
- Kim Young-seok as Constable Song
- Park Se-joon as Lieutenant Moon
- Jung Dong-hwan as Prosecutor Kim Seung-won
- Jung Han-heon as Nishihara
- Kim Hong-seok as Oowaku
- Im Dae-ho as Kenji
- Yoon Cheol-hyeong as Unit 731 lieutenant Tamura
- Lee Hee-do as Unit 731 private Ohara
- Hong Soon-chang as Unit 731 동물반 Isaki
- Yoon Moon-sik as Go-ga
- Jung Sung-mo as Lee Sung-do
- Jung Ho-keun as Kwon Dong-jin
- Jung Myung-hwan as Kang Gyun
- Song Kyung-chul as OSS agent Park Il-guk
- Kim Joo-young as Seo Kang-cheon
- Kim Hyun-joo as Ga Jeuk-ko, Ha-rim's lover and boarding house owner
- Jeon Mi-seon as Oh Soon-ae
- Lee Young-dal as Soon-ae's grandfather
- Kim Na-woon as Mae-ran
- Kwak Jin-young as Im Gap-saeng
- Jung Ok-seon as Mr. Go's wife
- Lee Sung-woong as Japanese 고등계 detective Yamada
- Maeng Sang-hoon as Konno
- Lee Mi-kyung as Hanako
- Kwon Eun-ah as Min-hee
- Kim Gil-ho as Ga Jeuk-ko's father
- Nam Young-jin as Kwon Joong-gu
- Hwang Beom-sik as Choi Sung-geun
- Im Moon-soo as Communist Party official
- Kim Ki-hyun as Kim Ki-mun
- Noh Young-guk as Kim Ho
- Han Suk-kyu as Young man from Seobuk
- Im Chang-jung as Gil-soo
- Na Young-jin as People's Commissar
- Hong Seong-seon as Young man with armband
- Seo Young-ae as Sang-beom's woman
- Moon Mi-bong as Old woman Kim
- Dennis Christen as 아얄티 lieutenant colonel
- Han Eun-jin as Old woman Geum
- Kim Yoon-hyeong as General Kim
- Park Young-tae as Han Kyu-hee
- Kim Dong-wan as Unit 731 surgeon
- Han Tae-il as Unit 731 daewi
- Yoo Toong as Unit 58 headquarters staff member
- Lee Chi-woo as Sergeant
- Cha Jae-hong as Detective Kang
- Ahn Jin-soo as Choi Cheon
- Kim Myung-soo as Jong-hoon
- Park Kyung-hyun as Interrogator Uhm
- Lee Kwang-hoon as OSS officer
- Hong Seung-ok as Sung-chul's wife
- Yoo Myung-soon as Il-gook's mother
- Park Jong-seol as Japanese military police 빨치산
- Oh Seung-myung as Commissary director
- Hwang Yoon-geol as Communist Party member
- Lee Byung-sik as Communist Party interrogator 1
- Kim Dong-hyun as Communist Party interrogator 2
- Shim Woo-chang as Communist Party member
- Lee Seong-ho as Communist Party member
- Cha Yoon-hee as Man on Jeju Island
- Park Hyeong-joon as Young man at anti-privatization protest
- Gu Bo-seok as Partisan worker

== Awards ==
1991 MBC Drama Awards

- Top Excellence Award, Actor: Choi Jae-sung
- Top Excellence Award, Actress: Chae Shi-ra

1992 Baeksang Arts Awards

- Technical Award: Jo Su-hyeon
- Most Popular Actor (TV): Park Sang-won
- Best Actor (TV): Choi Jae-sung
- Best Actress (TV): Chae Shi-ra
- Best Director (TV): Kim Jong-hak
- Best Drama
- Grand Prize (Daesang) for TV

1992 Korean Broadcasting Awards

- Best Drama
