= Lee Phillip =

Korean-American actor

- Born: Lee Kwang-hoon; 26 May 1981 (age 45); Washington, D.C., United States
- Education: Boston University; George Washington University
- Occupation: Actor
- Years active: 2007–2012

Korean name
- Hangul: 이필립
- RR: I Pilrip
- MR: I P'illip

Birth name
- Hangul: 이광훈
- RR: I Gwanghun
- MR: I Kwanghun

Lee Phillip (born 26 May 1981), is a Korean-American actor. He is best known for his roles in South Korean television series such as The Legend (2007) and Secret Garden (2010).

== Career ==
Using the stage name Lee Phillip, he began his entertainment career in South Korea as a model, then made his acting debut in the 2007 fantasy series The Legend. For his performance as the masked warrior Cheoro, Lee was nominated as Best New Actor at the 2007 MBC Drama Awards and the 2008 Baeksang Arts Awards.

More supporting roles followed; he played a lawyer in the crime drama The Slingshot (2009), and a martial arts choreographer in the romantic dramedy Secret Garden (2010). In 2012, Lee was cast as a Goryeo-era doctor in the period drama Faith, his third time to work with screenwriter Song Ji-na after The Legend and The Slingshot. But he had to leave the series before its finale due to an eye injury.

== Filmography ==
Year	Title	Role	Network
2007	The Legend	Cheoro	MBC
2009	The Slingshot	Do Jae-myung	KBS2
2010	Secret Garden	Im Jong-soo	SBS
2012	Faith	Jang Bin	SBS

== Awards and nominations ==
Year	Award	Category	Nominated work	Result
2007	MBC Drama Awards	Best New Actor	The Legend	Nominated
2008	44th Baeksang Arts Awards	Best New Actor (TV)	The Legend	Nominated
