= Choi Jae-sung =

South Korean actor (born 1964)

- Born: November 18, 1964 (age 61); Gangbuk District, Seoul, South Korea
- Occupation: Actor
- Years active: 1986–present

Korean name
- Hangul: 최재성
- Hanja: 崔宰誠
- RR: Choe Jaeseong
- MR: Ch'oe Chaesŏng

Choi Jae-Sung (born November 18, 1964) is a South Korean actor. Choi debuted with KBS TV drama series, Diary of a High School Student in 1984. Choi entered stardom through The Tree Blooming with Love and Lee Jang-ho's Baseball Team.

== Filmography ==
*Note; the whole list is referenced.

Year	English title	Korean title	Romanization	Role	Director
1986	Lee Jang-ho's Baseball Team		Lee Jang-ho-ui oeingudan		
1986	Little Big Man		Jakeun gochu		
1987	Highway (The Expressway)		Gosokdoro		
1987	Forget-me-nots		Mulmangcho Nareul iss-ji maseyo		
1988	Lee Jang-ho and Alien Baseball Team 2		Lee Jang-ho-ui oeingudan		
1988	Dol-ai 4-Dunebuggy		Dol-a-i 4 dunbeogi		
1988	Sweet Brides		Dalcomhan sinbudeul		
1988	Puppy Love		Peul-ip sarang		
1988	Don Quixote on Asphalt		Aseupalteu wi-e Dongkihote		
1989	My Love, Don Quixote		Naesarang Dongkihote		
1989	Damdadi		Damdadi		
1990	This Is the Beginning of Love		Salang-eun jigeumbuteo sijag-i-ya		
1990	A Small Autocratic Republic		Dogjae sogonghwagug		
1993	When Adam Opens His Eyes		Adam-i nuntteul ttae		
1994	Rosy Life		Jangmibich insaeng		
1995	Thief and a Poet		Doduggwa si-in		
1996	Two Men		Tumaen		Kwungwo Park
1997	Partner		Pateuneo		
1999	Gangster Lessons 2		Kkangpaesu-eob 2		
2000	Black Rain		Heuk-u		
2000	The Rules of a Gangster 3		Kkangpaesu-eob 3		
2001	Running 7 Dogs		Chil-in-ui Saebyeok		
2001	Saulabi	싸울아비	Ssaul abi		
2004	Cotton	무명			
2006	Boys of Tomorrow		Woo-ri-e-ge Nae-il-eun Up-da		
2006		꿈은 이루어진다			
2008	My Mighty Princess	무림여대생			Kwak Jae-yong

=== TV ===
- 1987, The Tree Blooming with Love (Sarang-i kkotpineun namu 사랑이 꽃피는 나무)
- 1991, Eyes of Dawn (Yeomyeong-ui nundongja 여명의 눈동자)
- 1997, Desire (Yeokmang 욕망)
- 1998, Gamer (Seungbusa 승부사)
- 1998, War And Love (Jeonjaeng-gwa sarang 전쟁과 사랑)
- 2000, Sound of Thunder (Cheondung sori 천둥소리)
- 2000, Love and Farewell (Sarang-gwa ibyeol 사랑과 이별)
- 2002, The Dawn of the Empire (Jeguk-ui achim 제국의 아침)
- 2002, Rustic Period (Yain sidae 야인시대)
- 2004, Jang Gil-san (Jang Gil-san 장길산)
- 2004, Immortal Admiral Yi Sun-sin (Bulmyeol-ui I Sun-sin 불멸의 이순신)
- 2006, Yeon Gaesomun (Yeon Gaesomun 연개소문)
- 2007, Time Between Dog and Wolf (Gae-wa neukdae-ui sigan 개와 늑대의 시간)
- 2009, Empress Cheonchu (Cheonchu Taehu 천추태후)
- 2010, The Great Merchant (Geosang Kim Man-deok 거상 김만덕)
- 2012, Dream of the Emperor (General Gyebaek)일반계백장군
- 2017, Revolutionary Love (Byun Kang-soo)
- 2018, Sunny Again Tomorrow (Park Jin-guk)
- 2019, Designated Survivor: 60 Days (Lee Gwan-mook)
- 2023, Woman in a Veil (Jung Hyeon-tae)

== Awards ==
- 1986 25th Grand Bell Awards : New Actor (이장호의 외인구단)
- 1986 22nd Baeksang Arts Awards : New TV Actor (별을 좇는 야생마, KBS)
- 1992 28th Baeksang Arts Awards : Best TV Actor (여명의 눈동자, MBC)
- 2014 KBS Drama Awards : Excellence Award, Actor in a Daily Drama (Single-minded Dandelion)
