= Park Sang-won =

South Korean actor (born 1959)

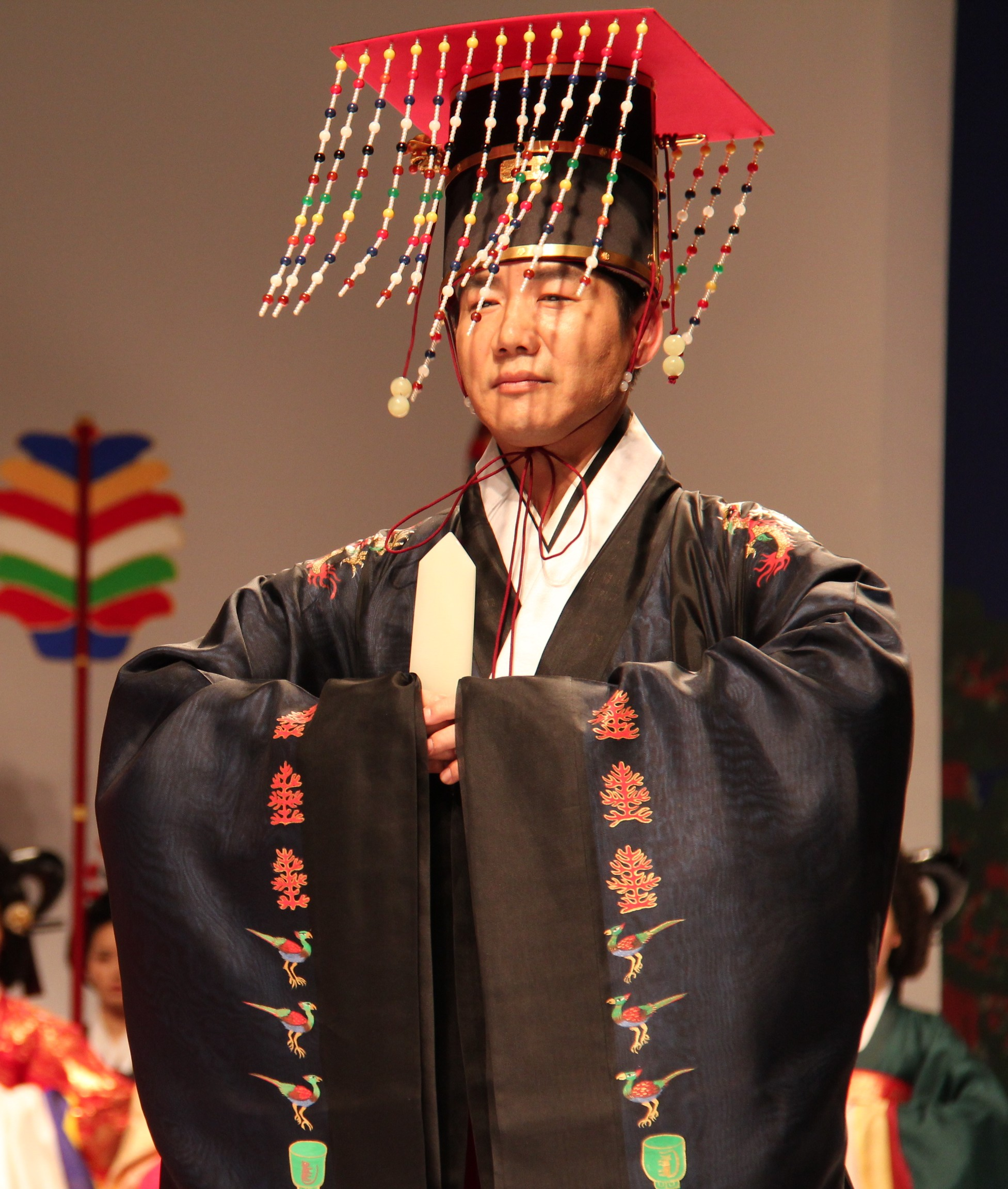
- Park at a royal wedding reenactment for the 2012 event Joseon Reawakens
- Born: April 5, 1959 (age 67); Daegu, South Korea
- Education: Seoul Institute of the Arts - Theater
- Occupation: Actor
- Years active: 1986–present

Korean name
- Hangul: 박상원
- Hanja: 朴相元
- RR: Bak Sangwon
- MR: Pak Sangwŏn

Park Sang-won (Korean: 박상원; born April 5, 1959) is a South Korean actor. He is best known for starring in four of the highest-rating Korean dramas of all time, Eyes of Dawn (1991), Sandglass (1995), First Love (1996), and You and I (1997).

== Filmography ==
=== Television series ===
- Beauty and Mr. Romantic (2024)
- It's Beautiful Now (2022)
- My Only One (2018)
- My Daughter, Geum Sa-wol (2015)
- Healer (2014)
- Rosy Lovers (2014)
- Faith (2012)
- My Daughter the Flower (2011)
- Golden Fish (2010)
- Dream (2009)
- Again, My Love (2009)
- The Legend (2007)
- Toji, the Land (2004)
- Like a Flowing River (2002)
- The Great Ambition (2002)
- Man of Autumn (2001)
- I Still Love You (2001)
- Golden Era (2000)
- You (1999)
- Love and Success (1998)
- White Nights 3.98 (1998)
- You and I (1997)
- First Love (1996)
- Sandglass (1995)
- Asphalt Man (1995)
- Thaw (1995)
- Goblin Is Coming (1994)
- Ambitions on Sand (1992)
- Time and Tears (1992)
- Rainbow in Mapo (1992)
- Women's Room (1992)
- Eyes of Dawn (1991)
- Seoul Sinawi (1989)
- Sleepless Tree (1989)
- Our Town (1988)
- Human Market (1988)
- MBC Bestseller Theater "River" (1987)

=== Film ===
- The Last Defense (1997)
- Ivan the Mercenary (1997)
- Seoul Evita (1991)

=== Variety show ===
- Untangodo Village Hotel 2 (2023)
- Dancing with the Stars: Season 3 (2013)
- Unanswered Questions (2006–2008)
- Missing: An Open Investigation (2004–2005)
- Beautiful TV Faces with Park Sang-won (1997–2002)
- Home and Mother with Park Sang-won (1997)

== Theater ==
- 42nd Street (2013)
- Evita (2011–2012)
- Rain Man (2010)
- 42nd Street (2009–2010)
- Once Upon a Time (2009)
- Le Paisse-Muraille (2006)

== Awards ==
- 2010 MBC Drama Awards: Golden Acting Award, Actor in a Serial Drama (Golden Fish)
- 2009 Museum of Contemporary Art Tokyo: Sak-Il-Hoi Award
- 2006 Ministry of Government Administration and Home Affairs: Minister's Commendation
- 1995 SBS Drama Awards: Top Excellence Award, Actor (Sandglass)
- 1992 28th Baeksang Arts Awards: Most Popular Actor (TV) (Eyes of Dawn)
- 1989 25th Baeksang Arts Awards: Best New Actor (TV) (Human Market)
- 1988 MBC Drama Awards: Best New Actor (Human Market)
