= Shin Dong-hyuk (disambiguation) =

Shin Dong-hyuk (Korean: 신동혁), a Korean name consisting of the family name Shin and the given name Dong-hyuk, may refer to:

- Shin Dong-hyuk, a North Korean defector and human rights activist living in South Korea
- Shin Dong-hyuk (footballer) (born 1987), South Korean footballer
- Shin Dong-hyuk (Hotelier), a fictional character in the TV series Hotelier
