= PpilKu =

Ppilku
- Hangul: 삘구
- Hanja: 삘九
- RR: Ppilgu
- MR: Ppilgu
- Directed by: You Jin-sun
- Written by: Youn Bo-hyun; Choi Seon-wu; Yu Ha-sun
- Produced by: Kwak Jeong-hwan
- Starring: Lee Min-woo; Kim Geum-yong
- Cinematography: Kim Nam-jin
- Edited by: Park Soon-duk
- Music by: Kang In-goo
- Release date: July 28, 1997
- Running time: 97 minutes
- Country: South Korea
- Language: Korean

Ppilku (Korean: 삘구) is a 1997 South Korean teen drama film.

== Plot ==
Pil-gu is a high school athlete and the leader of an underground club called Shock. Along with the Shocks, the judo club and a girls' club called Sexy Wave led by Hee-jeong cause plenty of trouble and mayhem in the school. The arrival of a pretty young teacher named Yoo Yuna gets the students in gear for another big scheme. Each club sets up a strategy to lure the new teacher. After beating numerous contenders, Pil-gu approaches Yuna.

== Cast ==
- Lee Min-woo as Pil-gu
- Kim Geum-yong as Yoo Yuna
- Kim Ki-yeon as Hee-jeong
- Hong Il-kwon as Hong-ik
- Kim Seong-su as Do-sik
- Won Ki-joon as Ki-chul
- Lee Dae-ro as Principal
- Oh He-chan as Student-in-charge
- Cho Hak-ja as Guidance counselor
- Kim Gyeong-jin as Female teacher
- Ra Kap-sung as Seon-joo
- Hong Chung-gil as Sailor
- Kim Jeong-yeon as Dong-ja
- Lee Dong-yeop as young Pil-gu
- Kim Seong-cheol as Yong-gu
- Kil Do-tae-rang as Detective squad chief
- Hong Sung-young as Detective Hong
- Yoo Seong as Detective Yoo
- Park Jae-seok as Shock member
- Bae Yong-joon as Shock member
- Kim Yu-heung as Shock member
- Lee Sung as Shock member
- Lee Se-chang as Shock member
- Kim Mun-beom as Shock member
- Yu Su-mi as Sexy Wave member
- Oh Yeong-mi as Sexy Wave member
- Park Yu-mi as Sexy Wave member
- Im Hae-won as Sexy Wave member
- Park Hye-yeong as Sexy Wave member

== Production ==
Ppilku began production in 1993 and completed filming in 1995. However, it only received a theatrical release in 1997. The movie's plot is similar to Salut D'Amour, a 1994 KBS drama series.
