= Dong-hyuk =

- Hangul: 동혁
- RR: Donghyeok
- MR: Tonghyŏk

Dong-hyuk, also spelled Dong-hyeok or Tong-hyok, is a Korean given name.

People with this name include:

== Entertainers and musicians ==
- Hwang Dong-hyuk (born 1971), South Korean film director
- Jo Dong-hyuk (born 1977), South Korean actor
- Dong-Hyek Lim (born 1984), South Korean pianist
- Haechan (born Lee Dong-hyuck, 2000), South Korean singer, member of boy band NCT

== Sportspeople ==
- Park Dong-hyuk (born 1979), South Korean football player
- Jang Dong-hyuk (born 1983), South Korean football player
- Kwak Dong-hyuk (born 1983), South Korean volleyball player
- Kwon Tong-hyok (born 1985), North Korean sport shooter
- Shin Dong-hyuk (footballer) (born 1987), South Korean football player
- An Dong-hyeok (born 1988), South Korean football player

== Other ==
- Shin Dong-hyuk (born 1982), North Korean-born human rights activist

== Fictional characters ==
- Shin Dong-hyuk (Hotelier), in 2001 South Korean television series Hotelier

== See also ==
- List of Korean given names
