= The Image: Volume 1 =

The Image: Volume 1 is a book commemorating the 10th year of Bae Yong-joon's career as an actor. On his tour of Japan between November 25 and November 29, 2004, Bae officially launched his book.

The book is a collection of photographs, divided into two booklets. Secret Hysteria consists of images of his body, built by months of weight-training and strict diet. The Traveller consists of his travel photos: swimming and cooking at the resort, walking in the streets of Phuket and Ipoh. The collection also includes an exclusive 62-minute DVD about the making of the photo-book and an interview of the actor about the project and his tour to the Southeast Asian countries.
