= Fighting Girl =

- Genre: Drama
- Directed by: Takao Kinoshita; Hidetomo Matsuda
- Starring: Kyoko Fukada; Yoon Son-ha; Shigeru Izumiya; Yūki Amami
- Ending theme: "Seed" by Time FellowShip
- Country of origin: Japan
- Original language: Japanese
- No. of series: 1
- No. of episodes: 12

Production
- Producer: Kazuki Nakayama
- Running time: 54 minutes

Original release
- Network: Fuji TV
- Release: 4 July – 19 September 2001

Fighting Girl is a Japanese television drama starring Kyoko Fukada.

== Synopsis ==
Sayoko is a tough 19-year-old with ambition, energy and nowhere to direct it. Her father clearly favors her blind 16-year-old sister. Junior college is unstimulating. She is fired from her part-time job in a dress shop because she is too diligent at catching shoplifters and slaps them around a bit when she does. Even her boyfriend opts out for a more docile girl, but Sayoko doesn't think she is tough enough.

Coming home on the train, she nonchalantly puts on her makeup and changes her shirt, oblivious to the other passengers' silent glares, until Ami (South Korean actress Yoon Son-ha) confronts her. They stare each other down and Sayoko gets off. The passengers commend the Korean student but she scoffs at them too, asking, "Instead of praising me, why don't you say something yourself?"

A few days later Ami is also the one who comes to the aid of Sayoko's sister, who has sprained her ankle when pushed on the platform. Ami can't understand whether the Japanese are kind or cold. They all look worried about you but no one steps forward to help, she tells the girl.

In gratitude, Sayoko's poor father invites Ami for expensive sushi. She shows up with five friends to make things more cheery and in doing so shows a lack of cross-cultural understanding herself.

Life gets more complicated when Sayoko goes to the beach to sulk and comes across a frustrated rich kid who she fends off with her considerable kickboxing skills. She loses her new belly-button jewel in the process, a guarantee they will meet again.

== Cast ==
- Kyoko Fukada as Sayoko Yoshida
- Yoon Son-ha as Ami Sō
- Aya Hirayama as Fuyumi Yoshida
- Shigeru Izumiya as Mitsuo Kurimura
- Yūki Amami as Shōko Mitsui
- Kenichi Hagiwara as Yūzō Yoshida

Preceded by Watashi o Ryokan ni Tsuretette; 11 April 2001 - 27 June 2001	Fuji TV Wednesday Dramas; Wednesdays 21:00 - 21:54 (JST)	Succeeded by Suiyōbi no Jōji (10 October 2001 - 19 December 2001)
