= First Love (1996 TV series) =

South Korean television series (1996–1997)

- Promotional image
- Hangul: 첫사랑
- RR: Cheotsarang
- MR: Ch'ŏssarang
- Genre: Romance
- Written by: Jo So-hye
- Directed by: Lee Eung-jin
- Starring: Choi Soo-jong; Lee Seung-yeon; Bae Yong-joon
- Country of origin: South Korea
- Original language: Korean
- No. of episodes: 66

Production
- Producer: KBS

Original release
- Network: KBS2
- Release: September 7, 1996 – April 20, 1997

First Love (Korean: 첫사랑) is a South Korean television series starring Choi Soo-jong, Lee Seung-yeon, and Bae Yong-joon. It aired on KBS2 from September 7, 1996 to April 20, 1997 on Saturday and Sunday at 19:55 for 66 episodes.

It is currently the second highest-rated Korean drama of all time, based on single episode viewership ratings, reaching 65.8% on its final broadcast on April 20, 1997. Its average rating for its entire run was 52.6%. In 1997, the series aired on China Central Television to commercial success and is widely considered the beginning of the Korean Wave.

== Plot ==
Brothers Sung Chan-woo and Sung Chan-hyuk and their sister Sung Chan-ok live in the poor countryside with their father Sung Duk-bae, trying to get by as a farming family.

The stern and hard-working Chan Woo and his older brother Chan Hyuk, an aspiring artist, are both in love with Hyo-kyung. She returns Chan-hyuk's affection. After learning the two are dating, Chan-woo finds it hard to be around her, though she tries to continue to be friendly with him. Lee Jae-ha (Jo Kyung Hwan), Hyo-Kyung's gangster father, is against her dating a poor artist.

A mysterious accident leaves Chan-hyuk paralyzed. Chan-woo, now a law student, gives up his career and joins the underground world of the mafia to seek revenge on Hyo-Kyung's family for his own family's suffering.

As the series progresses, Chan-woo is still in love with Hyo-kyung and is torn between his love, the loyalty to his brother and desire for revenge. As the paralyzed Chan-hyuk grows distant to Hyo-kyung, she became drawn to Chan-woo. There was also the childhood friend Kang Suk-hee with a crush on Chan-woo.

== Cast ==
- Choi Soo-jong as Sung Chan-hyuk
- Lee Seung-yeon as Lee Hyo-kyung
- Bae Yong-joon as Sung Chan-woo
- Song Chae-hwan as Sung Chan-ok (Chan-hyuk and Chan-woo's sister)
- Choi Ji-woo as Kang Suk-hee
- Park Sang-won as Kang Suk-jin (Suk-hee's brother)
- Lee Hye-young as Park Shin-ja
- Son Hyun-joo as Ju Jung-nam (guitarist)
- Bae Do-hwan as Oh Dong-pal
- Jo Kyung-hwan as Lee Jae-ha (Hyo-kyung's father)
- Yoon Mi-ra as Hyo-kyung's mother
- Kim In-moon as Sung Duk-bae (Chan-woo's father)
- Jeon Yang-ja as Chairman Jun (Suk-jin's mother)
- Park Jung-soo as Shin-ja's mother
- Kim Tae-woo as Park Hyung-ki (Chan-woo's classmate)
- Song Hye-kyo as one of the students being tutored by Hyo-kyung
- Cha Tae-hyun as Chan-woo's friend
- Michael Bratvold as French exchange student

== International broadcast ==
Due to Bae Yong-joon's popularity post-Winter Sonata, First Love was aired in Japan on NHK in 2005. In Vietnam, the series was broadcast on VTV3 in 1999, and on VTV2 in 2014.

== See also ==
- List of Korean television shows
- Contemporary culture of South Korea
