= Papa (TV series) =

1996 South Korean television series

- Hangul: 파파
- RR: Papa
- MR: P'ap'a
- Genre: Romance; Drama; Family
- Written by: Oh Soo-yeon
- Directed by: Jeon Ki-sang
- Starring: Bae Yong-joon; Lee Young-ae
- Opening theme: "Papa" by Park Jung-chul
- Ending theme: "Papa, Come Vorrei"
- Country of origin: South Korea
- Original language: Korean
- No. of seasons: 1
- No. of episodes: 18

Production
- Producer: Jun Ki-sang
- Production location: South Korea
- Running time: 50 minutes

Original release
- Network: Korean Broadcasting System
- Release: January 3 – February 29, 1996

Related
- Salut D'Amour (TV series)

Papa (Korean: 파파) is a 1996 South Korean television series that aired on KBS2 from January 3 to February 29, 1996 with a total of 18 episodes.

== Synopsis ==
=== Prologue ===
The prologue of the story is not shown in the first episode, but is revealed through flashbacks in various parts of the drama series, notably when a character is thinking about his past experiences.

Choi Hyun-joon was a university student who met Han Se-yung and fell in love, during his years in a university. Se-yung became pregnant with Se-Byeol prior to their marriage. Their friend, Hye-min, was secretly in love with Choi and frequently met with Choi to assist his writing. Se-yung often saw the couple in intimate conversations sharing laughter etc., right until Hye-min decided to go to America to further her studies, due in part to relation problems which developed between Choi and Han. Han later decided to file a divorce with Choi shortly after.

=== Episodes 1-8 ===
Hyun-joon, a university professor and a best-selling novelist, who is the father of a six-year-old daughter, lived with his two roommates who are his friend and ex-brother-in-law, Han In-pyo. Han In-pyo is a loafer who frequently hangs out with his girlfriends and squanders away his time at home on music, movies, and calling girlfriends. He came to live in Choi's house immediately after his water supply was cut off while washing his face. In-pyo's water supply and electricity were cut off for he had owed the electrical supply board a large sum of unpaid fees.

A conflict happened when In-pyo met Yong Gong, who also appeared after renting a room from Choi. He tried to punch Gong, as he (mistakenly) was angry at Gong for flirting with Se-yung at the bar, and letting her off altogether by boarding a taxi by herself. Se-yung was surprised to find Gong in Choi's house as well as a son.

His friend, Yong Gong, was a widower who worked as a Chinese physician. His wife died the previous year (1995) after a car accident. Yong Gong also had a naughty and greedy son, Jae-hong. Yong Gong eventually fell in love with Yoon Hye-won, a pharmacist who doted on his son. They first met after Hye-won brought Jae-hung into her pharmacy as he ran, fell, and injured himself when he was following Hye-won doing exercises.

On the other hand, In-pyo, fells in love with a kindergarten teacher, who happened to be the teacher of the children of Hyun-joon and Yong Gong. They first met outside a fashion shop. In-pyo first attracted her attention by splashing a puddle of dirty water with his car onto her pants. They later met again while meeting Jee-yeong, and again at the kindergarten where his niece Se-Byeol and Jae-hung are students. At the kindergarten, In-pyo tried to attract her attention by criticizing her attitude and dress as a teacher from what he saw the previous day, in front of her colleagues. Han In-pyo felt jubilant after that, but the children protested by highlighting their risk of being transferred out to another school. The kids told their fathers of Han In-pyo's conduct at the kindergarten, both of whom demanded him to apologize to the teacher.

In-pyo apologized to the teacher the following day. Hee-ju disguised herself as another individual when In-pyo came in, who presented an apple. Shortly after In-pyo left the kindergarten, Hee-ju followed suit and proceeded to her car, where her chauffeur, Mr Wang, was waiting for her. Hee-ju requested to drive towards In-pyo short of crashing into him. Hee-ju lowered her spectacles and apologized after doing so. As Wang drove off, a jubilant Hee-ju gave a bite on the apple In-pyo gave. In-pyo himself was smiling as well. He subsequently frequently visited the kindergarten, even during lesson time, and spent time eating and shopping with Hee-ju.

=== Episode 9-18 ===
As time progressed, the three men's affairs with women also progressed, but complications arose as Yong-min tried to balance his relations between Hye-min and Se-young. This happened when Hee-min had just returned from America to Korea, and frequented the university Choi was teaching in and his house. In-pyo also had a hard time getting approval from Hee-ju's father and elder brother for their relationship.

However, after deliberations and persuasion by his son, he approved at episode 17, on condition that In-pyo would agree to change his course of study to a new course that could assist his company. Hee-ju's father also warned In-pyo that he would only allow the couple to marry after three years, and they would have to break up if his behavior changed for the worse.

After sending Hee-min to America with the termination of their relations and Se-young shaking off her relationship with her boss, Kang Dong-Seok, Hyun-joon eventually reconciled with his ex-wife Se-young after a separation of many years. Se-young is working in a film production company, under Kang, to create the film Salut D'Amour.

Yong Gong got to marry the pharmacist who lived with his entire family and Hyun-joon's brother-in-law eventually went abroad to America to study, as a promise to marry Hee-ju if both of them excel academically.

Se-young and Hyun-joon confessed their feelings towards each other after Hyun-joon broke up with Hye-min, who had already returned to America to further her studies for another three years. At this time, Yong Gong married the pharmacist, Hye-won after dating indirectly for sometime as well as pressure applied by his son. Yong Gong had confessed his love to Hye-won in episode 17 at her pharmacy shortly after she wound up for the day. That was the same time Hye-won was introduced to a blind date through her father.

The duo later met again at the KBS radio station where Choi worked. The duo then hugged each other after confessing their needs to each other.

== Cast ==
- Bae Yong-joon - Choi Hyun-joon

Father of Heun-heun, formerly married to Se-young for a few years. Worked as an author and school teacher, but later resigned from his job and became a narrator on one of the KBS stations. Later reconciled with Se-young.

- Lee Young-ae - Han Se-young

Mother of Heun-heun, formerly married to Hyun-joon for a few years. They married when they had Heun-heun, and first met during their University days. A staff of a film production company, and dated with Yong Gong and her boss Gang Dong-suk. She has a younger brother, In-pyo.

- Jung Chan - Han In-pyo

The ex-brother-in-law of Hyun-joon and younger brother of Se-young. However, In-pyo still continued to address Hyun-joon as "brother-in-law". Formerly a dissolute hippie, his behaviour improved when he lived with Hyun-joon. He had numerous girlfriends. Han studied in the laboratory as a science student. Later dated Hee-ju, but met resistance from her father. Studied with Hyun-joon during their youth.

- Choi Yoon-young - Lee Hee-ju

The daughter of a wealthy businessman. Worked as a kindergarten teacher, and happened to be the teacher of Se-Byeol and Jae-hung. Her mother died a few years ago, and her father had gone through at least one operation in America. Hee-ju has an elder brother and a younger sister, Suk-ji. Later dated In-pyo.

- Lee Hye-young - Yoon Hye-won

Worked as a pharmacist. Made her first appearance in episode 2. Frequently played with Jae-hung and later married Gong.

- Park Chung-hyun - Yong Gong

A widower whose wife had died in a car accident in 1995. Worked as a Chinese physician, assistant to the clinic's boss. Had a son, Jae-hung. Attempted to date Se-young, but later gave up. Se-young was his childhood friend.

- Lee Jae-ni - Suk-ji

The younger sister of Hee-ju. A student of Hyun-joon who liked him very much. Fell in love with Jeong-mun. In spite of her tender age, she owned a mobile phone and a car, which were luxuries during the mid-1990s.

- Choi Jong-won - Shin Shin-ho

A middle-aged Chinese physician who is a mild cheeky toad, and boastful by nature. Initially attempted to tie Miss Bae with Gong, but later changed his views to Hye-won. He is married with several children, and his parents, both of whom had died from stroke, inspired him to become a physician. Shin has been practicing medicine for the past twenty years. He later acted as a witness during Gong's and Hye-won's wedding.

- Lee Jung-yoon - Choi Se-Byeol

Daughter of Se-young and Hyun-joon. Lived intermittently with either of her parents, and very sensitive to relationships. Five years of age.

- Choi Kang-won - Yong Jae-hung

Son of Yong Gong. A clumsy boy, Jae-hung loved to eat and would cry at the slightest thing. Often thought of his mother, and would call "mother" upon meeting a long-haired lady.

- Kim Yong-ju - Son Hye-min
- Kim Yeong-ju - Son Hye-min
- Kim Kyu-chul - Kang Dong-seok

The chairman of the film production company Se-young was working in. He had proposed to Se-young, who eventually returned to Hyun-joon

- Cha Tae-hyun - Jang Jeong-mun

A young boy who fell in love with Suk-ji, and their relations developed successfully.

- Yoon Son-ha - Miss Bae

A hospital nurse, who befriends Yong Gong. Worked as the clinic nurse under Doctor Shin and Gong.

- Kim Min-hee - Jang Jee-yeong

A friend of In-pyo and Suk-ji.

- Im Chan-ho - Mr Lee

Father of Hee-ju and Suk-ji. The chairman of the company he was working in. His wife died a few years ago and he himself had undergone at least one operation.

- Kim Kyung-eung - (no name)

A staff member, secretary of the film production company Se-young was working in. His name was never revealed.

- Park Sol-mi - (no name)

Bit part in Episode 15, friend of Hee-ju's fiancée's younger sister. Her name was never revealed.

== Soundtrack ==
- Papa - Park Jung-chul
- Again - Jung Seok-won
- Bank - 뱅크
- Come Vorrei
- California Dreamin' by The Mamas & the Papas

== Trivia ==
- Bae, as Choi Hyun-joon in Papa was the author of the Korean version of Salut D'Amour. The content described in Papa strongly corresponds to the story in this drama. This is evidenced in one scenario in episode three, Choi (Bae) was having a grand meeting on his third fiction book. The Korean words "사랑의 인사" were written on the display signboard for the meeting. Bae starred as Kim Yong-min in Salut D'Amour.
- The lyrics of the theme song contain a humorous "Por Por Por..." rhythm, a form of a human mimic of the car horn. It can be heard after the words "차윤 데 나지만! (jayun de nachiman!)"
