= Hotelier (South Korean TV series) =

2001 South Korean television drama series

- Hangul: 호텔리어
- RR: Hotellieo
- MR: Hot'elliŏ
- Genre: Drama; Romance
- Created by: Kang Eun-kyung
- Directed by: Jang Yong-woo
- Starring: Bae Yong-joon; Song Yoon-ah; Kim Seung-woo; Song Hye-kyo
- Opening theme: "Hotelier"
- Ending theme: "Sarang-eul Wihayeo" (사랑을 위하여)
- Country of origin: South Korea
- Original languages: Korean; English
- No. of episodes: 20

Production
- Producer: Shin Ho-kyun
- Production locations: South Korea; Las Vegas
- Running time: 50 minutes

Original release
- Network: Munhwa Broadcasting Corporation
- Release: April 4 – June 7, 2001

Hotelier is a 2001 South Korean television drama series set in Seoul Hotel, a fictional five-star hotel undergoing an expensive expansion and renovation. The word "hotelier" means "a person who owns or runs a hotel."

Starring Bae Yong-joon, Song Yoon-ah, Kim Seung-woo and Song Hye-kyo, it aired on MBC from April 4 to June 7, 2001, on Wednesdays and Thursdays at 21:55 for 20 episodes. Bae's character is based on Korean-American businessman Hong Seung-pyo.

== Synopsis ==
President Choi, hotelier of Seoul Hotel, dies from a heart attack hours after his old friend Kim Bok-man informed him that his company Hankang Distribution was buying Seoul Hotel shares in preparation for a takeover. Choi is succeeded by his wife, Yoon Bong-sook, who had never assumed any managerial position in the hotel before. Her son, Choi Young-jae is a dissolute young man who refuses to work and spends all his time partying.

To fend off the competitor, Madam Yoon sends one of the hotel employees, Seo Jin-young, to America to try to rehire Seoul Hotel's former hotel manager, Han Tae-jun, who was forced to resign after a scandal despite his innocence. Tae-jun is currently taking care of Jenny, a drug-addicted Korean-American girl.

To assist him in buying Seoul Hotel's shares through whatever means possible, Bok-man hires Frank Shin (aka Shin Dong-hyuk), a wealthy Korean-American lawyer, businessman, and mergers and acquisitions specialist.

Frank only agrees to take the job after meeting Jin-young in America and being fascinated by her. Traveling to Seoul for the first time since he left the country as a child, Frank and his loyal business assistant Leo move into a chalet at the Seoul Hotel to better conduct their secret business deal.

Through Frank's double dealings, Bok-man learns of Seoul Hotel's mismanagement problems. But Frank finds himself falling in love with Jin-young, and Jin-young feels torn between him and her old friend and colleague Tae-jun.

Meanwhile, Young-jae falls for Kim Yoon-hee, a melancholic heiress and Bok-man's daughter, after meeting her at a nightclub. But Yoon-hee is attracted to the kind and mature Tae-jun, whom she'd encountered at a birthday party held at Seoul Hotel.

Tae-jun is weighed down by his numerous responsibilities: defending the hotel from its competitors, protecting Yoon-hee from her abusive father, preventing Jin-young from falling in love with the suspicious Frank, and helping Young-jae mend his ways.

Frank soon discovers that Jenny, whom Tae-jun had rescued, is his biological sister. Together, they go to see their father, who calls them by their Korean names, Dong-hyuk and Dong-hee. His reconciliation with his family and love for Jin-young results in a change of heart for Frank, and he decides to switch sides and help Seoul Hotel.

Tae-jun and Frank work together and succeed in re-establishing Seoul Hotel's reputation as a top hotel. Bong-sook is diagnosed with cancer and dies. Frank and Jin-young get engaged. Yoon-hee goes to Las Vegas to study business, and Tae-jun follows her abroad; in a scene after the ending credits, Tae-jun and Yoon-hee are shown reuniting on a highway road.

== Cast ==
- Bae Yong-joon - Frank Shin / Shin Dong-hyuk
- Song Yoon-ah - Seo Jin-young
- Kim Seung-woo - Han Tae-jun, hotel manager
- Song Hye-kyo - Kim Yoon-hee
- Youn Yuh-jung - Yoon Bong-sook, hotel owner
- Park Jung-chul - Choi Young-jae, son of Yoon Bong-sook
- Joo Hyun - President Choi
- Han Jin-hee - Kim Bok-man, chairman of Hankang distribution, Yoon-hee's father
- Choi Hwa-jung - Lee Soon-jung, housekeeping manager
- Huh Joon-ho - Oh Hyung-man
- Choi Yong-min - Leo Park, Frank's business partner
- Kim In-moon - Shin Jang-hae, Dong-hyuk's father
- Kim Na-rae - Jenny / Shin Dong-hee
- Myung Gye-nam - head chef
- Lee Gae-in - Manager Yoo
- Yoon Yong-hyun - Guard Jung
- Kang Ji-woo^{1} - bellboy Hyun-chul
- Lee Jung-yong - Assistant chef Lee Gap-seu
- Kim Yong-hee
- Yeo Hyun-soo
- Ahn Hye-ran - Eun-joo, Yoon-hee's best friend
- Shin Shin-ae as Shin Geum-soon
- Kim Hee-jung - Soo-jin, (guest, episode 6)

== Awards and nominations ==
Year	Award	Category	Recipient	Result
2001	MBC Drama Awards	Top Excellence in Acting Awards, Best Actress	Song Yoon-ah	Won

== Notes ==
- ^{1}Credited as Kang Young-seok.
