= Bae Yong-joon =

South Korean businessman (born 1972)

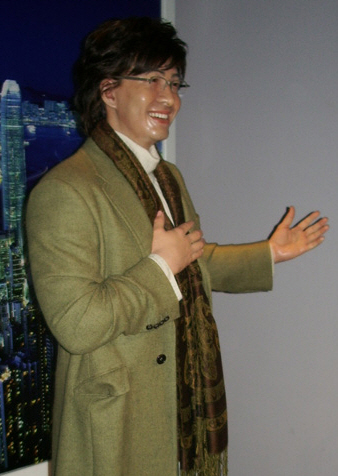
- Waxwork of Bae
- Born: August 29, 1972 (age 54); Seoul, South Korea
- Occupations: Businessman; actor
- Years active: 1994–2017
- Spouse: Park Soo-jin (m. 2015)
- Children: 2
- Awards: Hwagwan Order of Cultural Merit (2008)

Korean name
- Hangul: 배용준
- Hanja: 裵勇浚
- RR: Bae Yongjun
- MR: Pae Yongjun
- Website: byj.co.kr

Signature
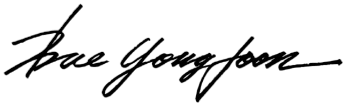

Bae Yong-joon (Korean: 배용준; Hanja: 裵勇浚; born August 29, 1972) is a South Korean businessman and former actor. He has starred in numerous television dramas, including, notably, Winter Sonata (2002), which became a major part of the Korean Wave. Bae retired from acting after 2007, but remains active as the chairman of management agency KeyEast.

== Early life ==
Bae Yong-joon was born in Mapo District, Seoul. He entered Sungkyunkwan University in 2000 as a Film Studies major.

== Career ==
Bae made his acting debut in 1994 in the Korean drama Salut D'Amour (lit. "Love Greeting"). The rookie actor quickly gained popularity, and a year later he won Best New Actor at the 1995 KBS Drama Awards for Our Sunny Days of Youth. Throughout the 1990s, Bae continued playing leading roles on television, in Papa (1996), First Love (1996) which reached a peak viewership rating of 65.8%, The Barefooted Youth (1998), and the Noh Hee-kyung-penned Did We Really Love? (1999). In Hotelier (2001), he played a mergers and acquisitions specialist about to takeover a hotel, but has a change of heart after falling in love with one of its employees (Bae would later reprise his role in a cameo in the 2007 Japanese remake of Hotelier).

But it was Yoon Seok-ho's Winter Sonata in 2002 that would transform Bae's career, and consequently the face of Korean dramas abroad. A melodrama about first love, lost memory and unknown family ties, Winter Sonata became an unprecedented success in Asia and more than 20 countries, particularly in Japan. Bae gained a tremendous fan base among Japanese middle-aged women, who dubbed him with the honorific nickname Yon-sama (ヨン様; cf. "Emperor Yon") and brought in US$2.3 billion in tourism and Winter Sonata merchandise sales.

In 2003, Bae was cast in his first major big-screen role in Untold Scandal (he had previously appeared in bit parts in two films in the 1990s). In contrast to his gentle, intellectual image, Bae played a conniving, sexually predatory nobleman in E J-yong's adaptation of Les Liaisons dangereuses set in 18th century Joseon. His performance received Best New Actor accolades from the Blue Dragon Film Awards and the Baeksang Arts Awards. He next published a photo book The Image: Volume 1 in 2004, which sold 10,000 copies.

Afterwards he worked with director Hur Jin-ho in April Snow (2005), about a stage lighting director who discovers his wife's infidelity when she becomes comatose after a near-fatal car accident with her lover. The film had a weak domestic run but due to Bae's star power, it set a new box office record for a Korean film in Japan with ¥2.72 billion.

Bae then entered the restaurant business, by establishing restaurants and cafes that capitalize on the well-being trend. He owns health food restaurant Gorilla in the Kitchen and high-end traditional Korean restaurant Gosire. As the most famous Korean actor in Japan, he became a proponent for Korean cuisine, and his Gosire lunchboxes (or bento) are sold in Japanese convenience stores and supermarkets. In 2006, Bae became one of Korea's wealthiest celebrities as the majority shareholder (34.6%) of management agency KeyEast (his stocks are valued at US$128 million as of May 2015). Most of the KeyEast executives, including president Bae Sung-woong, are Bae's former managers and have worked with him for more than ten years.

Bae made his much-anticipated return to television in 2007 in The Legend (also known as Taewangsasingi, lit. "The Four Guardian Gods of the King"). The big-budget period-fantasy epic was written by Song Ji-na and directed by Kim Jong-hak, and Bae played dual roles: Gwanggaeto, 19th ruler of the Goguryeo kingdom; and Hwanung, believed to be the son of God and founder of Gojoseon. He was paid ₩250 million (US$217,000) per episode, making him the highest paid Korean television actor of all time.

In 2009, Bae and Winter Sonata co-star Choi Ji-woo reunited as voice actors for the animated series Winter Sonata Anime, which aired in Japan. He also wrote a book of photo-essays A Journey in Search of Korea's Beauty, which promoted Korean traditional culture such as ceramics, liquor, hanbok, pansori, hanok, Hangul, kimchi-making, temple stays, museums and historical sites. It became a bestseller, and has been translated to Japanese, Taiwanese, Chinese and English. A Journey in Search of Korea's Beauty was later turned into an eight-episode TV documentary that aired on MBC Life in 2011.

In 2009 and 2010, he was the star of D3 Publisher's Nintendo DS edutainment series Bae Yong-joon to Manabu Kankokugo DS ("Learn Korean with Bae Yong-joon"), consisting of three games: Bae Yong-joon to Manabu Kankokugo DS (beginner level), Bae Yong-joon to Manabu Kankokugo DS Date Hen (intermediate level), and Bae Yong-joon to Manabu Kankokugo DS Test Hen (advanced level).

Bae and KeyEast entered into a joint partnership with Park Jin-young and JYP Entertainment in 2009, which eventually produced Dream High (2011), a teen musical series that revolved around the lives of students attending a high school for the performing arts. As creative producer, Bae supervised the screenplay and production; he also appeared in a four-episode guest arc. The collaboration between KeyEast and JYPE, named Holym, lasted until 2013.

== Personal life ==
He and actress Park Soo-jin announced their engagement in May 2015 and married on July 27, 2015 at the Sheraton Grande Walkerhill Hotel. The couple only invited friends and relatives to the wedding and forbade attendance of the press media.

== Filmography ==
=== Film ===
| Year | Title | Role | Notes | Ref. |
|---|---|---|---|---|
| 1994 | The Young Man | | Bit part | |
| 1997 | PpilKu | Shock member | Bit part | |
| 2003 | Untold Scandal | Jo-won | | |
| 2005 | April Snow | In-su | | |

=== Television series ===
| Year | Title | Role | Notes | Ref. |
|---|---|---|---|---|
| 1994 | Salut D'Amour | Kim Young-min | | |
| 1995 | Our Sunny Days of Youth | Ha Seok-joo | | |
| 1995 | Drama Game: "Six Steps to Separation" | Kyung-min | | |
| 1995 | Sea Breeze | Jang Moon-young | | |
| 1996 | Papa | Choi Hyun-joon | | |
| 1996 | Colors: "Blue" | | | |
| 1996 | First Love | Sung Chan-woo | | |
| 1997 | The Angel Within | Man in café | Cameo | |
| 1998 | The Barefooted Youth | Han Yo-seok/Jang Yo-seok | | |
| 1999 | Did We Really Love? | Kang Jae-ho | | |
| 2001 | Hotelier | Shin Dong-hyuk/Frank Shin | | |
| 2002 | Winter Sonata | Kang Joon-sang/Lee Min-hyeong | | |
| 2007 | Hotelier | Shin Dong-hyuk | Cameo; Episode 1 | |
| 2007 | The Legend | Damdeok/Hwan-woong | | |
| 2009 | Winter Sonata Anime | Kang Joon-sang/Lee Min-hyeong | Voice role | |
| 2011 | Dream High | Jung Ha-myung | Guest role; Episodes 1–4 | |

=== Music video appearances ===
| Year | Title | Artist | Ref. |
|---|---|---|---|
| 2001 | "Goodbye, My Love" | Jo Sung-mo | |
| 2002 | "Ditto and Sympathy 2" | | |

== Video games ==
| Year | Title | Platform |
|---|---|---|
| January 25, 2007 | Pachinko Fuyu no Sonata Pachitte Chonmage Tatsujin 10 | PlayStation 2 |
| December 25, 2008 | Pachinko Fuyu no Sonata 2 Pachitte Chonmage Tatsujin 15 | PlayStation 2 |
| September 19, 2009 | Bae Yong-joon to Manabu Kankokugo DS (Learn Korean with Bae Yong-joon DS) | Nintendo DS |
| December 23, 2009 | Fuyu no Sonata DS | Nintendo DS |
| August 26, 2010 | Bae Yong-joon to Manabu Kankokugo DS Date Hen (Learn Korean with Bae Yong-joon DS Date Version) | Nintendo DS |
| August 26, 2010 | Bae Yong-joon to Manabu Kankokugo DS Test Hen (Learn Korean with Bae Yong-joon DS Test Version) | Nintendo DS |

== Bibliography ==
| Year | Title | Ref. |
|---|---|---|
| 2004 | The Image: Volume 1 | |
| 2005 | 100 Days of Bae Yong-joon | |
| 2007 | BYJ Family Book | |
| 2009 | Journey in Search of Korea's Beauty | |
| 2012 | Visit to Kyoto | |

== Accolades ==
=== Awards and nominations ===
Name of the award ceremony, year presented, category, nominee of the award, and the result of the nomination
| Award ceremony | Year | Category | Nominee / Work | Result | Ref. |
|---|---|---|---|---|---|
| Baeksang Arts Awards | 1996 | Best New Actor – Television | Our Sunny Days of Youth | Nominated | |
| Baeksang Arts Awards | 1997 | Most Popular Actor – Television | First Love | Won | |
| Baeksang Arts Awards | 2002 | Most Popular Actor – Television | Winter Sonata | Won | |
| Baeksang Arts Awards | 2004 | Best New Actor – Film | Untold Scandal | Won | |
| Baeksang Arts Awards | 2008 | Best Actor – Television | The Legend | Nominated | |
| Blue Dragon Film Awards | 2003 | Best New Actor | Untold Scandal | Won | |
| Blue Dragon Film Awards | 2003 | Popular Star Award | Untold Scandal | Won | |
| Grand Bell Awards | 2004 | Best New Actor | Untold Scandal | Nominated | |
| Japan Men's Fashion Association | 2004 | Best Dressed of the Year, International category | Bae Yong-joon | Won | |
| KBS Drama Awards | 1994 | Best New Actor | Salut D'Amour | Nominated | |
| KBS Drama Awards | 1995 | Best New Actor | Our Sunny Days of Youth | Won | |
| KBS Drama Awards | 1995 | Photogenic Award | Our Sunny Days of Youth | Won | |
| KBS Drama Awards | 1996 | Excellence Award, Actor | First Love | Won | |
| KBS Drama Awards | 1996 | Popularity Award | First Love | Won | |
| KBS Drama Awards | 2002 | Top Excellence Award, Actor | Winter Sonata | Won | |
| KBS Drama Awards | 2002 | Popularity Award | Winter Sonata | Won | |
| Korea Brand Image Awards | 2009 | Broadcasting Category | Bae Yong-joon | Won | |
| Korea Drama Awards | 2008 | Hallyu Achievement Award | The Legend | Won | |
| Korean Entertainment 10th Anniversary Awards in Japan | 2013 | Best Actor | Winter Sonata | Won | |
| Korean Entertainment 10th Anniversary Awards in Japan | 2013 | Grand Prize (Daesang) | Winter Sonata | Won | |
| Korean Model Center Best Dressed Awards | 1996 | Recipient | Bae Yong-joon | Won | |
| Korean Most Popular Entertainment Awards | 2002 | Best Actor (Television) | Winter Sonata | Won | |
| Kyunghyang Shinmun Readers' Choice: Special Advertisement Awards | 1997 | Readers' Favorite Advertisement Model | Bae Yong-joon | Won | |
| MBC Drama Awards | 1999 | Excellence Award, Actor | Did We Really Love? | Nominated | |
| MBC Drama Awards | 2007 | Best Couple Award | Bae Yong-joon (with Lee Ji-ah); The Legend | Won | |
| MBC Drama Awards | 2007 | Grand Prize (Daesang) | The Legend | Won | |
| MBC Drama Awards | 2007 | Popularity Award | The Legend | Won | |
| MBC Drama Awards | 2007 | Top Excellence Award, Actor | The Legend | Nominated | |

=== Honors ===
Name of country or organization, year given, and name of honor or award
| Country or organization | Year | Honor / Award | Ref. |
|---|---|---|---|
| Journalists Association of Korea | 2004 | Proud Korean Award – Public Art Category | |
| Ministry of Culture, Sports and Tourism | 2008 | Hwagam Medal | |
| Stars of Korean Tourism Awards (Note: Hosted by the Ministry of Culture, Sports and Tourism) | 2010 | Achievement Award | |

=== Listicles ===
Name of publisher, year listed, name of listicle, and placement
| Publisher | Year | Listicle | Placement | Ref. |
|---|---|---|---|---|
| Forbes | 2010 | Korea Power Celebrity 40 | 21st | |
| Forbes | 2011 | Korea Power Celebrity 40 | 33rd | |

== See also ==
- Contemporary culture of South Korea
- Korean Wave
