= Lee Min-woo (actor) =

South Korean actor (born 1976)

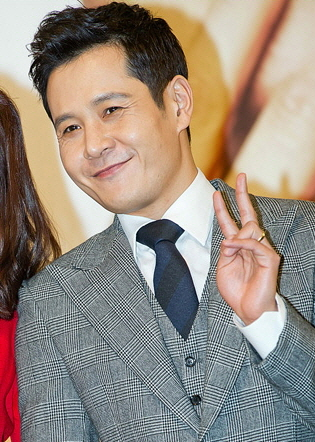
- Lee at The Wedding Scheme premiere, on March 30, 2012
- Born: Lee Dong-min; March 15, 1976 (age 50); Seoul, South Korea
- Education: Chung-Ang University; Theater and Film
- Occupation: Actor
- Years active: 1981–present
- Agent: Alomalo Humane Entertainment

Korean name
- Hangul: 이동민
- RR: I Dongmin
- MR: I Tongmin

Stage name
- Hangul: 이민우
- Hanja: 李珉宇
- RR: I Minu
- MR: I Minu

Lee Min-woo (born Lee Dong-min on March 15, 1976) is a South Korean actor. He began his career as a child actor in 1981, then starred as the titular lead character in the 1997 teen movie PpilKu. Lee has since appeared in numerous television series, notably the 2011 historical drama The Princess' Man.

== Filmography ==
=== Television series ===
- The Story of Park's Marriage Contract (2023–2024) - the king (special appearance)
- Little Women (2022) - Won Sang-woo Cameo
- Gunman in Joseon (KBS2 / 2014) - Emperor Gojong
- Dating Agency: Cyrano (tvN / 2013) - Go Do-il
- Wonderful Mama (SBS / 2013) - Lee Jang-ho
- The Sons (MBC / 2013)
- The Wedding Scheme (tvN / 2012) - Seo Jang-won
- KBS Drama Special: "Girl Detective Park Hae-sol" (KBS2 / 2012) - Yoo Seok-won
- Daddy's Sorry (TV Chosun / 2012) - Dong-sik
- The Princess' Man (KBS2 / 2011) - Jung Jong
- Detectives in Trouble (KBS2 / 2011) - Lee Dong-suk (guest appearance, ep 1-3)
- Life Is Beautiful (SBS / 2010) - Lee Soo-il
- Life Is Good (MBC / 2009-2010) - Kim Ki-wook / Kim Hyung-joo (guest appearance)
- Hometown of Legends: "Gisaeng House Ghost Story" (KBS2 / 2008) - Hyo-rang
- Before and After: Plastic Surgery Clinic (MBC / 2008) - (guest appearance, ep 12)
- M-Box (MBC Dramanet / 2008)
- Merry Mary (MBC / 2007) - Seon Do-jin
- MBC Best Theater: "The First Man of the Witch of the East" (MBC / 2007) - Young-woo
- Hearts of Nineteen (KBS1 / 2006-2007) - Hong Woo-kyung
- Age of Warriors (KBS1 / 2003) - Jung Gyun, son of Jung Jung-bu
- Children in Heaven (KBS2 / 2002) - Seo Yang-kil
- Five Brothers and Sisters (SBS / 2002) - Kim Chang-min
- Why Women? (SBS / 2001-2002) - Min-woo
- Ladies of the Palace (SBS / 2001-2002) - Im Baek-ryung
- MBC Best Theater: "Fever" (MBC / 2001) - Joon-ki
- I Want To Keep Seeing You (SBS / 2000-2001) - Kim Eun-yeol
- RNA (KBS2 / 2000) - Nam Woo-suk
- New Nonstop (MBC / 2000) - Min-woo
- Look Back in Anger (KBS2 / 2000) - Lee Dong-jin
- Love Story: "Open Ended" (SBS / 1999-2000) - Sang-ho
- Invitation (KBS2 / 1999) - Kim Hyun-tae
- Y2K (MBC / 1999) - Gong Jin-hyuk
- KAIST (SBS / 1999-2000) - Lee Min-jae
- My Love By My Side (KBS1 / 1998-1999) - Heo Se-chan
- Shy Lovers (MBC / 1998)
- 70-Minute Drama: "1997 Life" (SBS / 1997) - Sang-jin
- Hometown of Legends: "Dead Man's Wish" (KBS2 / 1997)
- Tears of the Dragon (KBS1 / 1996-1998) - Prince Yangnyeong
- Start (KBS / 1996)
- Hometown of Legends: "Sahujeolbu Yamul" (KBS2 / 1996)
- Dazzling Dawn (KBS1 / 1996) - Park Yeong-hyo
- Star (MBC / 1996) - Jung-hoon
- Kaesong Era (KBS / 1995)
- Love Blooming in the Classroom (KBS2 / 1994)
- Tale of Chunhyang (KBS / 1994) - Lee Mong-ryong
- Han Myung-hoe (KBS2 / 1994) - Yeonsangun
- When I Miss You (KBS / 1993) - Tae-hyun
- The Sun and the Moon (KBS / 1993)
- Dinosaur Teacher (SBS / 1993) - Min-woo
- Freezing Point (KBS / 1990)
- Our Paradise (MBC / 1990) - Chun-soo
- O, Heaven (KBS / 1988-1989) - Jeongjo
- Ggurugi (MBS / 1986) - Lee Han-sae
- Silver Rapids (KBS1 / 1985) - Chadol
- TV Literature: "Bird of the Underworld" (KBS / 1984) - a boy monk
- 500 Years of Joseon (MBC / 1981) - Danjong

=== Film ===
- Hill of Freedom (2014) - Ji Kwang-hyun
- Our Sunhi (2013) - Sang-woo
- Rush (1999) - Sang-jin
- A+ Life (1999) - Yong-joon
- A Mystery of the Cube (1998) - Duk-hee
- PpilKu (1997) - Ppil-gu

=== Variety show ===
- 사기꾼들 (JTBC / 2012)

== Theater ==
- Romeo and Juliet (1998)

== Awards ==
- 2011 KBS Drama Awards: Best Couple Award with Hong Soo-hyun (The Princess' Man)
- 1999 SBS Drama Awards: Special Award (KAIST)
- 1998 KBS Drama Awards: Excellence Award, Actor (Tears of the Dragon)
- 1995 Baeksang Arts Awards: Best New Actor, TV category (Tale of Chunhyang)
- 1994 KBS Drama Awards: Best Young Actor (When I Miss You, Han Myung-hoe, Tale of Chunhyang)
- 1985 Baeksang Arts Awards: Best Child Actor, TV category (TV Literature 저승새)
- 1984 KBS Drama Awards: Best Child Actor (TV Literature 저승새)
