= Jung Yoo-kyung =

South Korean television screenwriter (born 1968)

- Born: December 8, 1968 (age 56); South Korea
- Occupation: Screenwriter
- Years active: 1994-present
- Agent: Pan Entertainment

Korean name
- Hangul: 정유경
- RR: Jeong Yugyeong
- MR: Chŏng Yugyŏng

Jung Yoo-kyung (born December 8, 1968) is a South Korean television screenwriter.

== Filmography ==
=== Television ===
- Salut D'Amour (KBS2, 1994)
- The Scent of Apple Blossoms (MBC, 1996)
- Yesterday (MBC, 1997)
- Forever Yours (MBC, 1998)
- Should My Tears Show (MBC, 1999)
- Secret (MBC, 2000)
- I Love You, Hyun-jung (MBC, 2002)
- Which Star Are You From (MBC, 2006)
- In-soon Is Pretty (KBS2, 2007)
- Please Marry Me (KBS2, 2010)
- You Are the Best! (KBS2, 2013)
- Marriage Contract (MBC, 2016)

=== Film ===
- Over the Border (2006)
