= Yoon Son-ha =

South Korean singer and actress (born 1975)

- Born: November 17, 1975 (age 50); Jeonju, South Korea
- Other name: Yun Sona (ユンソナ)
- Occupations: Actress; singer
- Years active: 1994–present

Korean name
- Hangul: 윤손하
- Hanja: 尹孫河
- RR: Yun Sonha
- MR: Yun Sonha
- Website: sonamusic.net

Yoon Son-ha (Korean: 윤손하; born November 17, 1975, Jeonju, South Korea) is a South Korean actress, singer and television personality (gaijin tarento). She is signed onto Sony Music Japan's SME Records division. Since making her debut in the MBC dramas, she has acted in Korea and Japan, probably due to her fluency in Japanese as well as in her native Korean, where she has gained popularity from starring in the Fuji TV drama, Fighting Girl with co-star Kyoko Fukada. In Japan, however, she is known as Yun Sona (ユンソナ).

== Marriage and controversy ==
On July 4, 2006, Yoon announced that she got engaged to a Korean entrepreneur who lives in Seoul. and she moved her base of operation to South Korea.

== Filmography ==
=== TV series ===
- 1994: KBS Salut D'Amour (Love Greeting)
- MBC Ready Go!
- MBC New Nonstop
- 1996: KBS Papa
- 1998: King of the Wind (Path of the Great Dynasty)
- 1999: MBC Did We Really Love?
- 2000: NHK Mouichido Kisu
- 2001: Snowflakes (KBS)
- 2001: Fuji TV Fighting Girl
- 2002: NTV Byoki Wa Nemuranai (Night Hospital / Illness Doesn't Sleep)
- 2003: TBS Good Luck!!
- 2003: NTV Ashita Tenki Ni Naare
- 2007: SBS Dear Lover
- 2010: KBS The Fugitive: Plan B
- 2013: SBS The Heirs
- 2015: SBS Enchanting Neighbor
- 2016: SBS Six Flying Dragons
- 2017: KBS Hit the Top

=== Films ===
- 2006 Kisarazu Cats Eye: World series (TBS)
- Last Love (2007)

== Discography ==
=== Studio album ===
- 2005 비인 (悲忍)

=== Singles ===
- "會いたい"
- "Song Bird"
- "Reach for the Sky"
