= Salut D'Amour (TV series) =

South Korean television series (1994–1995)

- Also known as: Love Greeting
- Hangul: 사랑의 인사
- Hanja: 사랑의 人事
- RR: Sarangui insa
- MR: Sarangŭi insa
- Genre: Comedy; Drama; Romance
- Written by: Jung Yoo-kyung
- Directed by: Yoon Seok-ho
- Starring: Bae Yong-joon; Sung Hyun-ah; Kwon Oh-joong
- Ending theme: West Coast Child of Sunshine
- Country of origin: South Korea
- Original language: Korean
- No. of episodes: 25

Production
- Production location: South Korea
- Running time: 50 minutes

Original release
- Network: Korean Broadcasting System
- Release: November 1, 1994 – April 25, 1995

Related
- Papa

Salut D'Amour (Korean: 사랑의 인사; RR: Sarangui insa; lit. 'Love Greeting') is a South Korean television series that aired on KBS2 from November 1, 1994 to April 25, 1995 with a total of 25 episodes.

== Synopsis ==
The theme of Salut D'Amour, unlike later versions, are not interconnected to one another by episode. Each episode contains a separate but closely related theme.

Episode 1-25 summaries

=== Episode 1 ===
The episode starts with a documentary show on Korea during the war, Korea during the year he was born in (1975)-riots and crowded streets in South Korea. The narrator talked about the population census taken on September 18, 1995. The population stood at 37,680,000 male and female sex ratio (1740:1124, males to females), as well as family events in 1982. The episode proceeds on showing a television telecasting a baseball match. (The documentary is actually shown on a television shown on a drama.)

Young-min continues to talk about his childhood days with Hae-yung studying together in the living room. Hae-yung switched off the television, and Young-min switched on the television as Hae-yung was doing her homework and Young-min was watching a football match. The duo fought for the television briefly before Young-min got up and kicked and stepped on Hae-yung's books.

The next scene showed Young-min getting ninety marks for a test, looking towards Hae-yung's paper who was sitting beside her. As Young-min was cheekily smiling on her bad results, she pinched his elbow. A siren suddenly wailed and the entire class hid under their tables. Young-min was smiling away as he saw Hae-yung, who looked rather unhappy. He then posed a humorous expression to cheer her up. Young-min smiled in response.

Following that, the episodes shows the view of the high school campus Young-min and his friends were studying in (along with the introduction title), and then onto Young-min sitting in the AVA room listening to Hae-yung lectures. The duo later went to have a coffee break.

Later scenes introduces Young-min friends and his friends at the university campus; Fengguan is being first introduced while making a phone call as Young-min rushed up to him.

On the same day, Young-min, Hee-dong and Hongguan were doing acrobatic lessons in the school hall under the guidance of the instructor. Young-min, who was wearing a cap, heard Fengguan grumbling on being tired. The camera turn at the three boys simultaneously–Young-min, Hee-dong to Hongguan.

Young-min and Hee-dong gave moral support to Hongguan as he grumbled. Immediately after the instructor stopped the radio, he called out Young-min, Hee-dong and Hongguan. They were being scolded for talking during his lessons, especially Hongguan, and were told to do the acrobatic exercises after school.

The boys later went out and talked about the exercises, with Hee-dong jumping about (and still wearing the red cap as he did for the exercises) and later attended lessons. The class laughed when the lecturer shared a joke. Inyo asked a question to the lecturer further than the lecturer had taught for the day (the entire class sighed upon hearing the news). The lecturer pleasantly replied that the question Renyu asked would be taught in the succeeding lesson.

Just after the lessons had ended, Jong-nam announced that there would be a volleyball match. All except Inyo stayed behind to hear the news. He gave a glance just as he was about to leave by the back door.

After lessons, the group went for a cup of coffee prior to the volleyball match, and they suggested that Maena was absent from school to escape from the upcoming volleyball match. Hee-dong was seen staring at two girls who were walking by.

The match later commenced, and the lecturer was nominated to be the umpire. The class cheered when each of the two teams scored a goal. Hee-dong was seen jumping about when he scored a goal for his team.

Just then, Maena was seen helping Hae-yung in packing their things at their room. Meina presented a musical box among her goods to Hae-yung.

Back at the school field, the class were playing their football match when Inyo came over to interrupt the umpire (lecturer). He offered him a drink, and consulted him on the upcoming scholarship. Jong-nam, who acted as the goalie, picked up the ball and happened to see Inyo talking to the umpire. Instead of kicking towards the players, Jong-nam bounced the ball, aimed it and kicked it towards Renyu who was still talking to the umpire. Renyu was shocked as the ball came flying towards him, and landed right on his forehead.

After the games, the boys talked about the games the class played as the proceeded towards Hae-yung's home. Meina grumbled once the boys entered their flat, for not assisting them in their packing. Hee-dong received further criticisms as he sat on their sofa and hugged on a soft toy.

As Hae-yung went to serve coffee, Hee-dong enthusiastically received the coffee tray and distributed to his friends. In the process, Hae-yung revealed that she had drunk coffee. Young-min made another offer, and she made the same remark as she arranged her things. Meanwhile, Hee-dong hopped onto a cushion next to a cupboard. A curious Hee-dong opened the cupboard and found a photo album.

Hee-dong flipped the album and found a picture of Young-min and Hae-yung during their childhood days. He called out to Hae-yung and Meina, who looked rather excited upon seeing the photos. Young-min, who was sitting on a nearby couch, initially ignored them as he wiped a mug but joined the group when Hae-yung showed him the photo. Young-min smiled, and revealed that the photo was taken on Hae-yung's birthday, by her own camera, and one of their friends said that the photo was intended for Young-min, but Hae-yung pushed her way in to get a snapshot.

At length, Young-min decided to keep it as he believed that they would be mistaken for being love birds. A disappointed Hae-yung looked on.

That night, Young-min showed the photo to his sister while she was ironing her clothes. As she looked at the photo, she gave the following details; the back portion of the photo was dated in 1984, during Hae-yung's birthday.

The next day, a classmate was seen pinching the face of his fat, chubby classmate. Fengguan, meanwhile asked Mae-na's place of origin. Mae-na confessed that she came from Quanzhou, and Fengguan said that his aunt was a native of Quanzhou. Hee-dong, overhearing this, said that people can come from any provinces in China; Jiangsu, Fujian, etc.

Soon afterwards, Hae-yung entered the class and was dressed up in her best suit. The entire class wooed at her as Young-min looked on. Young-min later chased up with Hae-yung as she was walking with Meina. Young-min looked a disappointed when he learnt that Hae-yung was to be introduced to a new boyfriend. Meina suggested that she would let Hae-yung call back that night. Young-min quickly refuted.

At a bistro, Hae-yung was seen talking to her new boyfriend. (He was seen laughing once humorously) before the phone rang. Hae-yung looked rather uneasy as he told his friend to recommend new girlfriends.

That night, Young-min was seen attending to Jianyu as he visited the CD-shop, and asked for wrapping papers. Young-min also wrapped a CD with wrapping paper and tied it into a present as he sat down and thought to himself.

Yeon-ae had come back as he went off to return home. Near the bus stop, Young-min happened to encounter Hae-yung getting down a bus after giving an unsuccessful phone call to Hae-yung. As Hae-yung ran towards the direction was walking (unknowingly), Young-min covered his face from Hae-yung's range and tried to walk towards her among the crowd of passersby. Afterwards, Hae-yung saw her best friend, the flaming Nick Pena. Hae-yung ran into Young-min. As Young-min raised up the umbrella to show his face, Hae-yung appeared shocked and relieved. Young-min flashed a smile at her.

The duo walked together, and talked as they walked. He gave her the present, and Hae-yung looked rather pleased as she opened the present.

Later that night, Young-min gazed out of the window at the rainy weather as he smiled to himself...

The episode ends with the television screen showing an athlete running for the Olympic games. He was subsequently being awarded the gold medal, with the South Korean flag being hoisted up the mast. Young-min narrated that Fengguan believed that the Olympic medal was made of genuine medal, but he thought so otherwise.

=== Episode 2 ===
The episode starts with Young-min sitting under a tree and reading a book. A narrative was also accompanied alongside, stating that Young-min and his buddies were studying biology in the university two years later. Young-min looked at the book with the Chinese idiom "管鮑之交" written on it.

In class, the lecturer, Professor Lee, questioned his students on their views on the topic taught on previous lesson. (The topic that was to be discussed with the words "萬歲前" were written on the chalkboard.) The lecturer questioned every student – Young-min, Jong-nam and two other students, all of whom claimed that they had not revised their work.

An angry lecturer then went forward to lecture on the students decadency on their progress. As he concluded, he looked at Young-min, whose head was bowed down.

The lecturer then proceeded to ask Fengguan, who recited the content the lecturer had asked for. After Fengguan recited the paragraph, the professor then remarked: "Besides Fengguan, none of you deserve to attend my class".

The lecturer then continued to give assignments for students that would be due the following week, and they are to be typed out using the computer. The students then gave a faint sigh upon hearing the words.

As the students got up to leave the classroom, the professor signalled to Fengguan at the door. Young-min and Hee-dong saw Fengguan bowing to the professor. Hee-dong shook his head as he went off.

Jong-nam joined Hee-dong and Young-min who were having lunch at the cafeteria. Fengguan came over to join the group and called out to Jong-nam. Hee-dong and Young-min called Fengguan to buy his own food as Fengguan expressed his desire to eat. As Fengguan dug into his pockets, he found out that he was out of money and borrowed some money from Hee-dong. Hee-dong reminded Fengguan to return the loan another day as he reached into his pockets.

As Fengguan went to buy his food, Jong-nam revealed that Fengguan had received his scholarship, and the boys were taken by surprise. Jong-nam continued that the entire class had known about this fact, and such scholarships are only given to people who excel academically or those who had pleased and/or helped the lecturer in some other ways.

A scene showed Fengguan wondering on Jong-nam's reasons being absent from class. Later, Young-min met Jong-nam riding a scooter while he was returning home. She stopped short in front of the shop, and went in. Young-min called out to her as she came out.

Another scene showed Jong-nam winding up her shop. Young-min asked for reasons on Jong-nam's truancy, and she replied that she had to help out on her family's business. As Young-min was about to leave, Jong-nam insisted that he had some coffee.

That same night, Jong-nam also revealed her past experiences to Young-min in a bar; her brother having died in a car accident, and her father had to enforce Jong-nam to work. Jong-nam drank to much beer and Young-min had to help her home. She sat on the ground, and Young-min carried her up. Jong-nam collapsed onto a nearby tree as she cried in Young-min's arms. He was carrying her.

The next day, Young-min and Hae-yung met Jong-nam as they were walking together. Young-min stopped to have a word with Jong-nam as Hae-yung excused herself. As Hae-yung walked away, Young-min excused himself and ran up to Hae-yung. Jong-nam looked on with a mild expression.

Meina was feeling unwell one night after a dinner with the group. She was brought to Yeon-ae's shop. Fengguan, who happened to be there, used a form of therapy by heating a paper clip and then pressing on her thumb. She felt some pain, and looked pinker after that.

Young-min sat under a tree, deep in his thoughts. Then he walked off, smiling...

=== Episode 3 ===
The episode starts with Hae-yung as a photo model, with Hee-dong helping to throw the leaves. Young-min, seeing this, blocked the camera and informed her of the meeting that was to be held at 11am.

The group assembled in a room, and discussed some school work. Meanwhile, the student leader came in, and wanted to elect Jong-nam as leader of the group. However, Hee-dong suggested that Young-min be the leader, and all his friends followed suit. The defeated Jong-nam then congratulated Young-min on his part.

Hee-dong was standing on his hands while talking to Young-min and Fengguan. Fengguan suddenly stepped on his hands and cried in pain and jumped back onto his feet. Later, Jong-nam was seen making criticisms in another group meet.

Another scene showed Young-min and his friends in a hall where they were doing Physical exercises. The studious Fengguan was noted for being dreaming half the time while doing the exercises; being one step slower than the rest. He was reprimanded by the instructor at the end of the lessons, together with his friends (to a lesser extent). The classmates laughed afterwards as the instructor told the class to perfect the dance steps by the next lesson.

After lessons, Hee-dong did a handstand as Fengguan talked about the role of sexes in class. Fengguan stepped on Hee-dong's hand. Hee-dong gave a groan in pain as he hopped onto his feet.

Jong-nam met Young-min and they decided to discuss their project, However, Young-min could not withstand Jong-nam's ignorant character, and made criticisms on her behaviour. The couple soon began quarrelling briefly before Young-min left her.

One scene showed Young-min calling Hae-yung as he was running up the slope. Young-min tripped as he ran up, and Hae-yung laughed. He got up to his feet and ran up to join Hae-yung. The duo were walking as the talked, and Young-min stopped for a few words with Jong-nam as they met her. Young-min then ran up to rejoin Hae-yung.

=== Episode 4 ===
Renyu came into the library, and met Jong-nam. He sat down beside her, and apologised for his behaviour he exhibited on the previous day. Renyu offered him his notes (saying that he had another copy), but Jong-nam left without taking along the notes.

Young-min came to greet Hae-yung, and they proceeded to the conference hall. At this moment, the student leader came over to introduce his sister. Young-min then decided to watch a movie at the theatre.

After conducting lessons, she decided to visit the student leader who was playing the piano. She entered the room, but he was grossly absorbed playing the piano. As Hae-yung left the room, she dropped her books which attracted the student's leader's attention.

Young-min went to visit Hae-yung, but only found Meina at home. A disappointed Young-min walked home, but found Hae-yung carrying a bouquet of flowers. He tried to hide his disappointment (that she has a boyfriend) by commenting on the subject itself.

Young-min walked downtown, and past a shop selling winter accessories...

=== Episode 5 ===
The next scene leaps onto a 360 degree turn which ends with a book on a tree. Hee-dong was practicing his dance steps, while Fengguan and Young-min looked on.

Hee-dong pointed at Hae-yung, who was walking with the student leader. The friends commented on his looks, and an upset Young-min told the friends to leave the place.

Hae-yung sat down on the bench with the student leader, and invited her to watch a movie. Meanwhile, Meina came over to talk about her feelings with the student leader, and borrowing the water heater from another friend (as theirs were spoilt).

Young-min visited the professor in his office, and the student leader (Jingguan) was seen talking with him. He told Young-min to buy some coffee. The professor suggested Jingguan and Young-min to find a job. (In this scene, Jingguan patted Young-min on his shoulder).

Hae-yung talked to Young-min near the library and invited Young-min for dinner. Young-min claimed that he was not free, and talked about the report that they have to hand in.

Young-min visited Hae-yung while conducting lessons. He made a joke that there was an insect on her nose while they talked.

Meanwhile, Renyu met Jong-nam carrying stacks of newsletters along the stairs. He offered to help her, and commented that he did not like girls with muscular arms. Young-min came over at this moment and dumped all the newsletter on his arms. Renyu carried it to the office while Young-min chatted with Jong-nam.

Hae-yung was dancing as she swept the room in her class, but was overseen by Jingguan. He treated her to dinner, but she said that she had a date with Young-min and would call him on the phone.

Young-min decided to meet Hae-yung at the campus pond. At length, Young-min decided to pass up his book project to the professor, but was held back for a long time. Hae-yung waited, but Young-min did not turn up. As he handed up the project, he found something wrong and told that he had to call the publisher later. Meanwhile, he said that he would go out and "buy something".

Hae-yung waited for Young-min while she met Renyu coming out. Renyu claimed that he might have seen Young-min with Jong-nam in the library, but he was not sure. Renyu suggested Hae-yung to wait a little while longer.

Young-min waited, and found out that the professor would leave for an hour or so. He excused himself through the professor's clerk, and rushed off to catch the bus. Young-min could not wait any longer and was forced to run to his destination. Meanwhile, Hae-yung left on seeing the darkening sky.

Young-min arrived at the pond, but Hae-yung had just left. An upset Young-min decided to call Hae-yung, but there was nobody to pick up the phone. Meanwhile, Hae-yung had just returned home and heard the phone ringing, but stopped as she was about to pick it up. She went to wash her hands in the basin.

Young-min decided to visit his sister's shop, and asked for directions of Hee-dong and Hae-yung. Meanwhile, Young-min's sister prompted him to look out of the window to see the falling snow.

Meanwhile, Jingguan called Hae-yung while she was boiling some hot water. Hae-yung realised that the water was getting overcooked and went to fetch the basin, and took a cloth to carry it away from the stove. She slipped, fell and scalded herself in the process. An anxious Jingguan repeatedly called Hae-yung on the phone, but there was no reply.

Meanwhile, Young-min had just returned home and he greeted his friends. Hee-dong then went to teach Fengguan the flamenco dance in the house. As he looked out of the window, he thought of the day's events...

Jingguan helped Hae-yung into the car and rushed her to the hospital. Her leg was bandaged, but she was permitted to leave the hospital the next day. Jingguan sat on her bedside and talked about the importance of life. He confessed about his feelings towards Hae-yung. At this time, Meina came rushing in to visit Hae-yung.

Young-min was washing the dishes as he talked to Fengguan, who was meditating. Meina called Fengguan, and informed that Hae-yung was injured.

In no time, Fengguan and Young-min rushed to the hospital. A remorse Young-min looked at Hae-yung, who was limping away. The group walked out of the hospital as Young-min apologised for missing the date on that day.

As Young-min took off his coat to cover Hae-yung, Jingguan came driving to fetch Hae-yung back home. Jingguan offered Fengguan and Young-min a lift home, but refused as their homes were not far off the hospital. They bowed as Jingguan walked towards his driver's seat.

Young-min, looking upset, told Fengguan to return home first as he walked onto the streets. Jingguan drove Hae-yung home as they chatted happily... (The theme song plays here).

Young-min, having learnt that his childhood friend is clearly in love with another man, was seen playing in a basketball court under the snow to vent his anger. Young-min aimed again and his basketball hit on the ring, so hard that it vibrated and rang loudly. The basketball bounced off, far away from Young-min...

=== Episode 6 ===
This episode features Hae-yung last appearance in the TV series. Hae-yung has already fallen in love with another man, and Young-min began to treat her coldly for being jealous as well as upset on her change of behaviour.

The episodes opens with the class sitting for an exam. Hee-dong looked rather lost as he worked on the paper, and Renyu asked for another foolscap as he worked on the problems. Hee-dong was the first to hand up, followed by the rest of his friends.

After exams, Fengguan looked into his book and felt disappointed upon learning that he had not studied for that particular chapter. Meanwhile, Hae-yung went for a coffee break with Jingguan. A subsequent scene shows a reluctant Hae-yung getting into Jingguan's car.

Mae-na and Hae-yung were walking together when they met Jingguan. Jingguan went forward to welcome Hae-yung, and asked about her condition of her leg. Hae-yung replied that she had completely recovered, but there were some scars. They went for a coffee break. Jingguan then brought Hae-yung to watch an ice-hockey match with him as promised. Hae-yung looked slightly reluctant on Jingguan's request.

Meanwhile, the group were talking about their exams after a group discussion in a multi-purpose room. As Renyu was giving his views on returning to the Literature society, Jong-nam made a nasty remark on Renyu' that he should just prepare his exams, and that he came and went as he wished, which made Renyu rather upset. Fengguan stepped in to put his support for Renyu.

That night, the friends, including Hae-yung and her boyfriend, were invited to a dinner at a tea-house. Hee-dong sang and danced while they waited for Hae-yung, who went to watch an ice hockey match. As she tried to step onto a lower step, she missed her footing but was helped by Jingguan.

Young-min looked very upset when Hae-yung turned up with her boyfriend, and sat at the far end of the table. Young-min looked very upset as he saw his lost love as the group went to a Karaoke lounge. He went out to buy some canned drinks, but Hae-yung and her boyfriend joined him. He later dropped the cans while chatting to Hae-yung, and her boyfriend helped Young-min. An upset Young-min left the scene without returning to the Karaoke lounge.

Hae-yung met Young-min another day at the campus' garden as he was drinking coffee. Hae-yung tried to greet Young-min, who gave a cold look at her. They argued about Hae-yung's relationship with Jingguan. Young-min then took out a 10,000 won note, and continued that he was returning the debt he owed Hae-yung the previous time. Hae-yung then went off as Young-min thought to himself.

Young-min paid a final visit to Hae-yung's home and chatted for a while. Just before he left, Hae-yung's boyfriend gave a call as Young-min smiled to himself.

Young-min went for a date with Hae-yung in a bistro and they talked about their old days. Young-min then confessed that he was telling some lies, and said that Jingguan really loved her. Hae-yung then thanked Young-min for spending their past times with her. He then gave Hae-yung a pair of gloves using his own earned-money, in return for the gratitude of the box that she gave.

Young-min took the gloves from her hands, and wore one on and made the other into a "cap". Young-min greeted Hae-yung under the identity of the puppet, and said that they used to play the similar way during their childhood days.

Young-min walked home as he thought to himself. It snowed when he reached home. Upon reaching home, he found Hee-dong and Hong-guan waiting for him, waiting for him to join the feast. Hee-dong poured the wine. As they knocked their first glass to drink their first toast, Hongguan drank for the friendship bond between the themselves.

Hee-dong and Hongguan encouraged Young-min to sing a song. As he sang, he thought about the notable past times he had with Hae-yung...

=== Episode 7 ===
The episode starts with a narration showing a rooster, a peacock, and other grassland animals...

The drama then proceed to the two friends talking between themselves at the window, before Young-min called them out. As they took a stroll in the campus garden, Hee-dong breathed out through his mouth to his friends, who evaded away in disgust.

Hee-dong ran off to a bistro, and sprayed some perfume into his mouth as he waited for his new girlfriend to come.

Jeong-ah's first appearance in this show as she entered the bistro, where Hee-dong was expecting her. Hee-dong was dumbfounded on seeing Jeong-an's beauty and the couple had a chat. Jeong-she mocked Hee-dong for being boyish, something that Hee-dong felt shameful. Hee-dong felt rather remorseful.

Hee-dong frequently visited the bistro Jeong-she was working in as a waitress, and frequently helped her out in her duties. Hee-dong occasionally peeped behind a holed wall in a bistro to see Jeong-ah. Once, he unanimously called upon a waiter to serve cappuccino to Jeong-she.

Hee-dong collected his monthly pay from Yeon-ae. Hee-dong looked jubilant when Jeong-she told him to invite his friends to the bistro. Later, Hee-dong was seen helping to serve drinks to the customers. His friends were amazed at his attitude towards Jeong-she. Hee-dong amused his customers with simple stunts, but soon was tired out.

Jeong-she introduced herself after Jong-nam and Young-min came over. Mae-na and Jong-nam looked at each other in amusement. Hee-dong came over to join his friends. Jeong-ah then proceeded to tell the poor financial state of her family. The friends looked on remorsefully as Jeong-she continued, before she whimpered.

Young-min and Hee-dong looked at each other, and Mae-na and Jong-nam looked at the boys as Jeong-she took out a donation box. The friends took out some money and threw into the box, one after the other. Renyu then made a short commentary that he was donating a few cents, all that he had left. Mae-na calculated her notes before throwing it into the box.

Jeong-ah then thanked everybody, and then looked at Hee-dong, who looked rather bitter. Hee-dong then reached into his pocket, and threw the salary that Yeon-ae had given him earlier into the box. Jeong-she then thanked Hee-dong as they smiled at each other. The others followed suit.

Just then, Jeong-ah's boyfriend came over. Hee-dong was dumbfounded as the duo talked. The friends all looked at Hee-dong in a mixture of pity and amusement as he flashed a false smile at them.

That evening, Hee-dong returned to the CD shop and happened to overhear two girls talking about Jeong-she. That night, he sprayed some perfume into his mouth, and appeared in front of Jeong-she who was waiting at the main road. She was surprised to meet Hee-dong, and called him to return home for fear of catching a cold. A white car drove up in front of them and gave a horn.

A young man with a crew cut got out of the car and came up to them. Hee-dong eyed at the man briefly before Jeong-she went off with the man. Hee-dong then smelt at the rose he was about to give Jeong-she. He looked up at the night sky.

Hee-dong walked about the living room that night. Young-min got up and saw Hee-dong and clapped at him. Young-min chatted with him to cheer him up.

The next day, at the swimming pool, Hee-dong prepared himself as Jeong-she was swimming. He took out a perfume from his swimming trunks, sprayed some of it into his mouth, and hid it again. Hee-dong proceeded to the jumping pool, and shouted to her. As she took off her goggles, he shouted, "Here I come!", and put on his goggles, and jumped into the pool, and reappeared in front of Jeong-she. They laughed.

The episode also features Jeong-an at the swimming pool with his brother Young-min and Fengguan. As Jeong-ah passed by, the duo talked about Hee-dong "excellent" swimming skills. Hee-dong swam up to her, appeared right in front of Jeong-an who felt utterly surprised.

The group dressed up and left the swimming pool. At the lift, Hee-dong departs from Young-min and Fengguan while he decided to stay behind.

=== Episode 8 ===
Yeon-ae introduced a friend of hers to Young-min in her shop. The man offered to shake his hand with Young-min, but Young-min gave him a cold look. At home, Young-min advised against his sister to continue their relations with the man.

Hee-dong showed off his skiing skills to Jeong-an as friends decided to go skiing at a shopping centre. Jeong-an, who had difficulty in skiing, showed off his skills in front of her, skiing around her as she laughed. Meanwhile, Jeong-an's old boyfriend came over, and showed off his skiing skills which appealed to Jeong-an as she clapped her hands. The boyfriend stopped short of kicking her down, and even scratched away some ice in the process.

The boys introduced themselves to each other, looking very glum in expression. Jeong-she decided to go skiing with the other boy, while Hee-dong looked on sadly. Yeon-ae was paying a visit to her former boyfriend in a bistro, who was already married.

Young-min and Jong-nam were looking on while their friends played. As the other friends hoppe back, Young-min decided to go onto the ice to ski, but bumped onto another person and fell just as he was running down the small flight of steps leading to the ice.

Young-min paid a final visit to Hae-yung's home and chatted for a while. Just before he left, Hae-yung's boyfriend gave a call as Young-min smiled to himself as he bade goodbye. Hae-yung called out to him.

Young-min walked home, and found his sister in her shop. He dropped by for a few words before returning home.

Young-min and his family and his friends decided to take a retreat at the snow-capped mountains. Young-min's uncle drove the entire group up the mountains by his van. The episode ends as the van cruises up the mountain road...

=== Episode 9 ===
Young-min and his friends decided to go hiking in the hills. Young-min realised that he had forgotten to buy some beverages shortly after he left the cafeteria. Hee-dong suggested that he would join Young-min, and the duo went away to purchase beverages. The girls decided to continue their way up and wait for the rest to return.

Meanwhile, Fengguan and Renyu were hiking as a splinter pair from the group. Renyu was soon overwhelmed with exhaustion, and held onto his wooden climbing stick more tightly. Renyu told Fengguan to stop as the pair sat down on a rock to catch their breath.

The girls walked on, but never uttered a word (as they were enemies after a quarrel on Young-min's poem). Jeong-an ran up to Jong-nam, and tried to be friendly. Jong-nam, remained harsh as ever as she continued her harsh remarks whenever Jeong-an would say something wrong.

The girls sat down, overwhelmed with exhaustion. Young-min and Hee-dong made their way up after buying the beverages. Hee-dong fell and hurt his right leg as he was ascending the hill with Young-min, and cried out aloud.

Two ruffians approached Jong-nam and Jeong-an while they rested on the rock. The ruffians talked harshly, and Jong-nam ordered them to be more polite. The ruffians tried to Jeong-an, and Jong-nam put up a struggle with the ruffians as Jeong-an ran and hid at the back of the tree.

Young-min and Hee-dong heard the commotion and ran up the hill. The ruffians stared at them. The boys asked them for their purpose of harassment, but the ruffians gave a dismissing reply. Young-min and Hee-dong threw down their backs respectively, ready to fight the ruffians.

Fengguan and Renyu, who were struggling to get up the hill, ran towards the group. Renyu pointed his stick and Fengguan took off his woolen cap and looked ready to fight the two ruffians. Seeing that they were being outnumbered, the ruffians retreated.

The group continued their way until evening. The girls looked at the surrounding panorama on a projected platform. The boys called out to them for dinner.

The group had some food, and Hee-dong fed Ahn-chae with his tangerine which Ahn-chae took it from his hands instead. Young-min, who decided that they would spend the night in the hills, was being pulled down and "beaten" up by his friends.

The friends went on their way as they sang. They walked in pairs; Young-min and Jong-nam, Hee-dong and Jeong-an and Renyu and Fengguan.

=== Episode 10 ===
Fengguan's childhood female classmate came to visit the friends. An over-friendly girl, she was especially close to Fengguan, who treated her very coldly.

The girl explored Fengguan's books and stationery, which he coldly snatched it from her. The girl even gave him a sweater, which Fengguan was reluctant to wear despite Young-min and Hee-dong persuasion. The girl told that she spent two months making sweaters of these designs, and the one she gave Fengguan was the best.

When the friends announced that the group has a meeting, Fengguan coldly told the girl that she was not permitted to go, but the friends immediately corrected that she was invited.

The girl went to the meeting, and put on her sweater. The friends made comments that the couple looked like inseparable lovebirds as the girl held Fengguan's shoulder. Fengguan felt so embarrassed that he excused himself to the toilet, and Young-min followed suit.

In the toilet, Young-min criticised Fengguan's cold attitude towards the girl. Young-min felt helpless as Fengguan remained indignant in his views towards the girl.

The girl invited the entire group to a treat at a food centre. The group ate greedily, including Fengguan, who continued to make nasty comments on the girl as she tried to spoon-feed Fengguan. The friends were surprised on how she could afford a treat, and the girl replied that she had a lot of savings after working for one year.

The friends discovered the girl's disappearance shortly after they left the food centre. A worried Young-min instructed the group to split up and search; Fengguan, Hee-dong and Jeong-an in one, Renyu, Young-min and Jong-nam in the other. The friends searched for a whole day, but failed to find the girl in the amusement park. They finally decided to approach the lost and found centre to broadcast the girl to approach the centre.

The friends waited on until Young-min instructed the rest to return home while he and Fengguan would wait for the girl to turn up.

The girl turned up in the evening while strolling past the shelter (near the broadcast centre) where the friends were standing. Young-min and Fengguan called out to her, and she ran towards them. Fengguan angrily scolded her for giving the trouble that the entire group had to face to look for her.

The trio sat around a table in a cafeteria and had coffee. The girl explained her reason for her disappearance being helping a girl who was trapped in a revolving door. When she had helped the girl, she could not find the friends, so she went roaming around.

Fengguan then criticised her for her deeds while Young-min asked whether she had heard the broadcast. The girl, being unable to withstand the criticisms, shouted at Fengguan for being arrogant just because he was a university student (in which case she isn't), and ran away in tears.

Young-min chased after her, and tried to console her. The duo then talked about her experiences with Fengguan; he was noted for his stubborn behaviour, and would snatch away his things from others who touched it. She even told Young-min about her academic performance in comparison with Young-min.

Young-min brought her home, and the girl packed her things. The girl waited for Fengguan at home, but believed that he would not return home. Hee-dong and Young-min sent off the girl at the bus station, who were frantically waving at one another.

Fengguan turned up just as Hee-dong and Young-min returned to the bus-station's premises. Fengguan looked rather sorry upon hearing the news.

The trio returned home, but did not see Fengguan when they were about to sleep. Young-min looked out the window, seeing Fengguan sitting on the swing with his heads bowed down.

The next day, Young-min was shocked to see Fengguan not turn up for breakfast. Young-min's elder sister suggested that he must have gone to the girl's village to look for her.

The next scene lapses Fengguan gazing out of the bus window. He grabbed the sweater the girl sewed, and reflected on his actions as he travelled to the girl's hometown to look for her.

=== Episode 11 ===
Yujin, a new student from another university campus who was to take literature, had a nasty encounter with the librarian for using her cousin's library card as well as returning a damaged book. Yujin had initially wanted to pay for the damages, but the librarian rejected the fine and gave her a stern warning. Young-min, on seeing the commotion, felt rather suspicious about her affiliations and fell into deep thought.

Yujin had another nasty encounter when she produced her cousin's library card upon loaning books. Young-min stepped in to help, and made up a story that Yujin needed to submit a recent photo for the card as the "old photo" showed her face, which has "undergone changes over the years". The librarian looked rather suspicious towards Young-min's explanation but passed Yujin.

Young-min and Yujin walked out of the library as they sipped some coffee. Yujin talked about her past experiences.

The following scene showed Yujin and Young-min dining in the school's cafe, talking about events that happened on the previous day. At this time, Yujin's father and Jingen happened to come into the cafe, both of whom looked a little surprised at the scene.

Yujin's father introduced himself, and confessed that he was graduated in 1968 in the university the friends were studying in; his personal character and his old friend was Young-min's lecturer, Professor Lee.

Jeong-eun lied to the professor that Young-min and Yujin were inseparable lovebirds, a news that the old man was unable to take. Young-min and Yujin tried to stop Jingen at the same time. Young-min, seeing the situation he was in, had no choice but to confess the "truth" by saying that he first met Yujin when he picked up her hat which the wind blew off. The angry man scolded Young-min for his youth and lack of experience, something that Young-min could not take it easily. Yujin, who grew tired of the sport, left the scene. Jingen finally confessed that the story were actually fantasy tales.

At this time, Zhongnan and Hee-dong entered the cafe. Hee-dong mistook Young-min for dating with Jingen, and threw his book as he shouted angrily. The friends exchanged glances with Hee-dong.

Jeong-eun walked as quickly as possible, and Hee-dong caught up and apologised for his misconception. They proceeded to a bistro, where Jingen continued scolding Hee-dong until he was upset, and gave a grin on her success of her clever tricks.

Young-min and Yujin were walking home as a wind blew off her hat. Young-min went down to the valley to pick her hat up, and waved in triumph after he picked it up. The lie which Young-min told Yujin's father has become a truth.

=== Episode 12 ===
This episode featured Hee-dong being addicted to dancing, notably Harry Connick, Jr. He danced in his sister's shop, knocking down goods in the process. In the dead of the night, Hee-dong was dancing while Fengguan called Young-min and his sister, who had just returned, to see Hee-dong.

Renyu was talking about not attending classes and taking the examinations at twenty for love greetings with Young-min. The band leader of W.O.W, who was the classmate of Renyu during their high school days, called out to Renyu. The band leader asked Renyu to introduce friends to their band group as they strongly needed a dancer. Young-min, having heard the news, reported to Fengguan and Hee-dong. Hee-dong immediately expressed his desire to be a band member, but referred to it anecdotally in front of his friends.

Hee-dong rushed to the group's underground venue and saw W.O.W. having a rehearsal. Hee-dong then proceeded to ask for permission to join the group as a break-dancer. The next scene showed the group sitting at the table and analysing Hee-dong's decision to become a break dancer. During the meeting, Renyu criticised Fengguan as an "old fashioned chap". The duo calmed down when Young-min stepped in to break the argument. At this time, Hee-dong burst in and enthusiastically talked about his entrance as a member of W.O.W.

Hee-dong faced some opposition among his friends on his decision to join the group, in view of their unruly behaviour as well as his university education. Xiuzhen, on the other hand, remained neutral and added that Hee-dong has the right to choose any career he liked. Renyu tried to argue, but was being ridiculed by Hee-dong on his (poor) knowledge of dancing skills. Young-min then raised his voice to call the group to proceed with the meeting and stop quarrelling.

That evening, Yujin went to the CD-shop where Young-min's sister was working. She asked for permission to work in the shop and her affiliation with Young-min (and found out that the shop owner was Young-min's elder sister).

Hee-dong was walking home with his sister after they wound up their shop. As they walked, Hee-dong sadly confessed that he would no longer be able to assist his sister's business and informed her that he would not accept the forecoming salary. His sister looked rather shocked when he continued that he was about to pursue a dancing career.

That night, while Hee-dong was dancing, Young-min came out of his room. Hee-dong sat down to talk about his forecoming dancing career. Hee-dong also told of objections from their parents and sought Young-min to convince them.

Hee-dong practiced his break-dancing skills daily in the dancing room of the university campus, and helped his sister less frequently on her business, who only accepted the decision of Hee-dong becoming a solo singer. Even on certain nights, he was seen dancing. Young-min stepped out one day to talk to Hee-dong, and he pleaded Young-min to persuade their parents to permit him to pursue his career. Young-min, seeing Hee-dong's willingness to pursue his career as incorrigible, only begged him to remember Young-min himself and his friends.

Fengguan called for Jeong-an for help to counsel Hee-dong, but got a reply saying that Hee-dong should be given the freedom of going his own route, never mind dropping out of university. The disappointed Fengguan and Young-min said that they could only pray for a miracle.

One day after work at the library, Young-min met Jong-nam on his way out and they talked about Hee-dong's dancing career. Young-min then mocked Jong-nam for being unable to dance, but Jong-nam repelled by claiming on her dancing skills.

On that same day, Hee-dong met Xiuzhen at the bistro. She asked for a cup of cappuccino and she went on to recommend careers for Hee-dong, with the intention of discouraging Hee-dong to pursue his dancing career. Hee-dong bowed his head down as Xiuzhen went on to appraise his skills in several fields and encouraged him to take up jobs in these fields. Hee-dong then continued that he wanted to pursue on his dancing career. Xiuzhen's smile faded away from her face.

Hee-dong bought a pair of dancing shoes after making a tour around town, and showed it off to Young-min and Fengguan the day he bought it. Fengguan made some critical remarks, but Hee-dong continued to give descriptions about the (light) weight of his shoe. Young-min, after being told by his elder sister to persuade Young-min to end his dancing career, cut short Hee-dong's conversation, and asked for reconsideration.

The next scene lapses Hee-dong describing about his dance steps to Fengguan, who later got out and informed Hee-dong that he would be sleeping with Young-min.

The next day, Young-min and Hee-dong met in the university campus, and Hee-dong danced about to show the weight of his shoes. Before the pair separated, they made a hilarious "W.O.W" sign by opening their palms. Hee-dong, who only walked a few steps from Young-min, slipped, skidded and fell when he stepped on a puddle of slush, spraining his leg in the process. Young-min was shocked at first, but laughed out then and there as he regained his composure. Hee-dong grimaced under intense pain as he lied on the ground, head up.

A narration talked about Hee-dong's passion on dancing. "We did not pray for Hee-dong to fail, but neither did anybody pray for Hee-dong to succeed in the dancing industry", the narration concludes here.

A few days later, the group were waiting for Young-min to arrive and officiate the meeting. As Jong-nam revealed her pleasure on Hee-dong for not entering the dancing industry, Hee-dong returned in crutches with his leg bandaged, limping about with a crutch and was being helped by Young-min into the cafe where their friends were waiting. Hee-dong revealed to his friends that he had thought of new dance techniques while resting in hospital for a few days. Hee-dong even suggested showing off to his friends, but was being "beaten up". Fengguan used Hee-dong's crutch and pointed at his face, to highlight Hee-dong's stupidity.

Hee-dong found Yujin alone at the CD-shop as he entered. Yeon-ae entered the shop, and was surprised to see his plight. She was pleased that Hee-dong's injury was a blessing offered to treat his sister, and hopped up and down with his crutches before hitting on his toe and leaning forward in pain. "My brother is so naughty!" his sister remarked.

Hee-dong listened to classical music instead of the usual rock as he starred pointlessly....

=== Episode 13 ===
The group decided to take a holiday in the Taebaek Mountains of Gangwon Province. They sat in the train, and sang and played as they went along, notably Young-min, Hee-dong, Jeong-she and Yujin who were sitting on one side of the train. Jong-nam, Renyu and Fengguan who were sitting on the direct opposite side, were relatively quieter. Jong-nam looked out of the window as her two friends looked at her. The friends played, before the next scene showed the minibus cruising up the mountain.

The group arrived at their motel via a minibus. They walked for some distance as they threw snowballs at each other. The friends ran up the hill, into their motel; two stories, and made of teak. The group were very happy as they sat around.

Suddeenly, Hee-dong announced that he had forgotten to bring rice along. Jong-nam immediately ridiculed him for his forgetfulness and told him to buy some. Hee-dong suggested buying rice or asking for some rice from the tour guide, but said that he had "thick skin". Young-min looked on, with his eyes opened big as Jong-nam criticised him, as a group leader, he should have the responsibility to have everything in order. With that, she felt pain in her abdomen, and left the group.

Hee-dong walked with Fengguan as they reflected on their actions. Fengguan felt the urge to proceed to the toilet just as Jeong-an came running. He ran away as Jeong-an and Hee-dong proceeded. The group soon dispersed off. Fengguan and Renyu went exploring the snow-capped jungles; Hee-dong and Jeong-an went for a romance trip in the tour guide's minivan.

Young-min and Yujin remained in the motel to prepare dinner. Young-min peeled the potatoes while Yujin encountered difficulty. Jong-nam came in at this moment, and asked about their friends whereabouts. She continued and questioned Young-min on the tour's result. Jong-nam called Young-min out to havefor word as he excused himself for a moment.

Renyu and Fengguan went exploring the jungles. Fengguan told Renyu on superstitions of tree's spirits but he dismissed it off as a joke.

Young-min and Jong-nam quarrelled just outside the house, while Yujin came out of the house. An infuriated Jong-nam left Young-min and walked off for a short distance before she bent down. Young-min went forward to help, but Jong-nam refused. The duo insisted that they would bring Jong-nam to the tour guide for help.

Young-min rushed to the tour guide's lodge, but found his doors locked. The clock showed (approximately) four o'clock in the lodge. A stranger came into the scene at this time, and greeted Young-min, a person who he had met before. Young-min asked for the whereabouts of the tour guide and Jong-nam's condition. In reply, the tour guide said that he had no idea where the tour guide and their friends had gone. The tour guide continued that there is a traditional medicinal practitioner whose house is just located two kilometres "straight on" from the lodge.

Young-min carried Jong-nam on his back, and ran towards the house. When they arrived, they found nobody, but the door was not locked. The friends looked around the house, and saw medicinal herbs hanging around the house. Young-min laid Jong-nam to rest on the mattress on the floor, and waited with Yujin.

Renyu and Fengguan returned to their motel and were surprised to see that the dinner was only partly prepared. Renyu was somewhat surprised that they went out without preparing dinner fully. Fengguan sat down on a chair and suggested that the group must have gone out for a stroll. Renyu then continued to prepare dinner, and cooked chicken. They were questioning each other just as Jeong-an and Hee-dong returned from their romance trip in the tour guide's minivan.

The rest returned and drank some coffee. They soon began to worry and Hee-dong suggested that they would go and look for the rest.

Young-min met the tour guide, who was washing his minibus. Young-min asked for permission to lend the minibus, and explained the problem.

Night was falling. Young-min and Yujin believed that the doctor would not turn up, and Young-min gave instructions to Yujin to take care of Jong-nam while he will return to the lodge and find the tour guide, and take his van to bring Jong-nam back home for safety reasons.

The girls were getting impatient and decided to make their way home. Jong-nam, who was feeling better, told Yujin that they would leave the place for safety reasons. As they walked further into the jungle, Jong-nam began to feel discomfort in her stomach and Yujin was getting increasingly afraid as the trees eventually blocked out the moonlight. Yujin advised Jong-nam to turn back, but Jong-nam convinced that they would reach their destination if they walked straight. Jong-nam bent down as she began to feel immense pain in her stomach again.

The search group went into the jungles with their torchlights to look for the rest grumbling about their hunger. They came to the doctor's home, but found nobody there and waited. Young-min came driving at this moment, and asked his friends for the girl's whereabouts.

The girls proceeded, and felt rather frightened. Jong-nam was puzzled about Young-min's attitude, but Yujin confided her. The next scene lapse into the group calling for them as the group walked on. Yujin suggested waiting but Jong-nam rebutted that she would continue on her way. Just as the Yujin confided her, she felt an immense pain in the stomach.

The group had found their tour guide and they decided to return to their lodge. They were rather surprised to find the duo drinking coffee.

They group played a game to cheer themselves up. Young-min was returning to the motel and saw Yujin standing outside the motel. The couple stood at the doorway as Yujin confided her past matters about her mother to Young-min. Meanwhile, the group sang some prayers in the motel.

Young-min and Yujin returned to the lodge. They drank beverages to call for the day. The next scene lapses into the Yujin sleeping with Jeong-an as they talked. Hee-dong was sleeping soundly nearby.

The next day, the group washed themselves along a river outside a house. The group threw snow at one another after a minor quarrel between Hee-dong and Fengguan.

=== Episode 14 ===
Episode 14, also known as Let It Be, talks about the friends who intended to go travelling. Hee-dong had initially decided not to go travelling with his friends for the sake of Jeong-she, who claimed that she was unable to go. Jeong-she later turned up at the train station in front of everybody (including Hee-dong) just before the group left.

The episode opens with Inyo walking along a street. Young-min woke up after hearing the door bell. He looked at the alarm clock. It was 3.10pm. His sister went to open the door, and saw Renyu. Young-min was rather surprised to meet him. Young-min's sister offered some coffee.

Fengguan asked why Renyu came over to their house in the dead of the night as they drank some coffee. Renyu confessed that he was afraid of sleeping alone at night after watching a horror film the previous day. He requested if the group would allow him to stay for the night, and offered to pay for his share household fees.

Hee-dong and Fengguan talked about Renyu as Young-min slept on the sofa in the living room to give his bed for Renyu.

A subsequent scene showed Hee-dong talking to his sister in the CD-shop about Renyu's bad points. At home, Fengguan was cleaning the living room with his vacuum cleaner as Renyu was At home, Fengguan was cleaning the living room with his vacuum cleaner as Renyu was sitting on a couch. Fengguan teased Renyu by facing the vacuum sucker as his leg.

Fengguan went into Young-min's room to complain about Renyu just as he was dressing up. Renyu came into the room to ask for the phone directory to call his friend. Renyi said that he wanted to return home as Fengguan gave him a nasty look.

The next scene showed Young-min working as a librarian in the campus' library. At the bistro, Yujin was serving to customers as Hee-dong and Jeong-an came in. Jong-nam was practicing fencing (with a wooden stick). Renyu came to greet her as Jong-nam was in the changing room.

At the shop, Young-min was at his sister's shop and informed her that their father had told his sister to meet a boyfriend. His sister asked about Yujin's work place. The next scene lapses Yujin serving beverages to Hee-dong and Jeong-she. Young-min came in shortly afterwards.

Inyo was practicing fencing with Jong-nam in the fencing room. Jong-nam suggest further practice on his fencing skills as she left as Renyu sat on the floor to rest.

Jeong-an, Young-min, Jeong-she and Yujin were discussing their affairs in the bistro. Back home, Fengguan grumbled about their telephone bills and Renyu's behaviour. Young-min sank into deep thought as Fengguan asked for his suggestions to expel Inyo from their home.

Yujin and Jeong-she were discussing their celebrities idols in their rooms and facial beauty in their room. The girls laughed out loud after sharing a joke.

Inyo returned home and asked for dinner. Inyo criticised about their house and the water heater as he got up to proceed to the toilet to bathe.

Jong-nam was looking at some books in a storage room for old books. Her parents, who were sitting around a table, asked about Renyu. Jong-nam introduced herself as Inyo's mother asked about him. She brought her to Young-min's house to look for him.

At the CD shop, Hee-dong was listening to rock as Young-min and Fengguan rushed in to tell Hee-dong about Inyo's news.

Young-min and Fengguan greeted Renyu by offering a feast for him. The friends talked about becoming an independent adult, such as preparing meals in his vicinity. A subsequent scene showed Hee-dong helping Inyo to wear a scarf (to protect his hair from getting dirty) as he was preparing meals. Young-min and Fengguan rushed out of their room, and Fengguan praised his culinary skills as he tasted the soup. Just as he was cooking, Inyo's mother and Jong-nam turned up at his house. He took off the hat he was wearing as his mother asked what he was doing in Young-min's house. Jong-nam talked with the boys about Inyo.

The next scene showed Inyo's mum reprimanding on him leaving home in Young-min room. Inyo defended his position and argued on his mother's ignorance just as Young-min came in to serve coffee. She remarked that Renyu's character has totally changed for the worse. Inyo stood up, and shouted twice that he is willing not to return home. In response, his mother slapped him, and Inyo left in a fury. Young-min put down the coffee tray, grabbed his coat and ran up to catch him, but an angry Inyo pushed off Young-min as he walked on. The trio who were sitting at the table and saw the commotion, lowered their heads in remorse.

Inyo and Young-min sat along the coast. Young-min helped Renyu to analyse his actions as he revealed his past; and his high expectations that his parents had on him. Inyo continued by asking if he is a fool.

The duo walked along the coastal passageway as Inyo talked about his actions. At the bistro, Jeong-she visited Yujin who was serving customers. They sat at the table to discuss their project work. They later prepared a dinner for the friends. Fengguan, Hee-dong and Jong-nam were wondering if Inyo and Young-min would turn up. Just then, Young-min turned up and they asked for Inyo's whereabouts. The next scene showed Renyu walking along the coast against the evening sky.

Back home, the boys and their sister were rather pleased to receive some preserved food left behind by Inyo. Hee-dong commented on the price and praised Inyo.

The next day at the campus, Young-min called for Renyu but found out he was not there. The group had a party at a restaurant. Just as Yujin was being pestered to sinh, Inyo turned up and asked for some wine. The entire group, with the exception of Young-min, gave him a cold and disappointed look at Inyo.

Inyo sang at the Karaoke as the group looked on, feeling rather uneasy. Inyo sang on, never opening his eyes...

=== Episode 15 ===
The episode starts with a narration talking about relations between siblings, and showed Young-min's photo with his siblings and Fengguan. A photo showing Fengguan, Yeon-ae, Young-min and Hee-dong was displayed on Young-min's desk.

Young-min's sister woke him up. A reluctant Young-min woke up as he commented on his late night the previous day. In bed, Young-min notified his sister of Hee-ju's arrival. He also suggested to call upon Renyu's older brother.

Fengguan was walking home and met Young-min's sister, who called him to enter after a very brief conversation. Just as Fengguan was about to leave, she asked about his father's vegetable plantation and asked Fengguan to bring over some vegetables when he returned home. Fengguan gave agreed to her request.

Young-min came out of the room and asked for his sister just as Fengguan entered the house. Hee-dong wondered if Shin cheng-shu, the man who wrote a letter to their family, was the singer himself. Young-min dismissed it as a joke.

Fengguan returned home as Young-min was preparing for dinner with Hee-dong. The next scene lapses into Young-min's sister sitting at the table in the shop. Young-min came into the shop to greet his sister.

A bearded passerby entered Young-min's shop when something caught his attention. Young-min was attending to a customer as he entered, and asked for Yeon-ae. The man, Shin Jun-yong, introduced himself to Young-min, (who later dated with his sister), and left.

Hee-ju first appeared in the scene when Hee-dong brought her Young-min's shop immediately after the man left. They proceeded to the bistro where Yujin worked.

The next scene lapses Young-min's elder sister returning to the shop. She looked rather disappointed when she learnt that the man had left.

Young-min walked into the campus, and met Jong-nam. They walked as they conversed, and the next scene lapses Hee-ju walking with Hee-dong. They sat down on the stairs for coffee. Just then, Hee-dong introduced Hee-ju to Jeong-an, who had come out of the main hall. Hee-ju felt rather tensed as Jeong-an stroked her hair. The trio then proceeded for a stroll around the campus.

Hee-ju was to be enrolled into the high school in the region by parental decision. In one scene, Hee-ju cooked breakfast before her sister woke up. She was by her culinary skills and later took over as the family cook.

Young-min was watching a basketball match with Jun-yong in their flat when Yeon-ae returned and bought groceries. Jun-yong joined Yeon-ae and Young-min for dinner.

After dinner, Young-min went to the CD-shop and found Hee-dong and Hee-ju eating dinner. Later, when he left the shop, Young-min took out a piece of bread from his pocket and took a bite before throwing it into the air.

=== Episode 16 ===
The episode starts with Young-min working in the university's library, as a librarian arranging books. Jong-nam called out to him and they later went for a coffee break.

Hee-ju and Hee-dong are watching a music video as Yeon-ae was running the CD-shop. Jun-yong came into the shop to look for Yeon-ae at this moment.

Young-min decided to work as a tutor. He visited his new tutee, whose mother was rather pleased with Young-min. The tutee looked rather unhappy and picked up his MP3 to listen to music. Young-min interrupted him but the tutee responded to him briefly before he continued to do his own things. Young-min snatched the playboy magazine from the tutee and told him to study.

Young-min and Jong-nam were discussing their project at a hawker stall while eating noodles, and Young-min handed him a yellow parcel. Before they left, Jong-nam told Young-min to do a fifty-page report.

At the CD-shop, Jun-yong was browsing through the CDs as he talked to Yeon-ae. Yeon-ae went off, and Jun-yong was surprised as he found that Yeon-ae had gone off.

Jun-yong ran forward as Yeon-ae was standing on a stool to wipe a display shelf. Jun-yong persuaded her to step down, but Yeon-ae insisted and said that the display was too dusty. As Jun-yong pulled her right elbow, Yeon-ae fell and landed on Jun-yong's chest. Young-min, who had just entered the shop appeared shocked and ran off. The couple looked at each other in embarrassment, unaware of Young-min's presence.

Meanwhile, Jun-yong was waiting for her outside her flat. He presented a bouquet of flowers, before they hugged each other. At this time, Young-min returned and saw the couple hugging each other. All the same, the couple hugged on each other tightly as Young-min turned his head around...

=== Episode 17 ===
The next day, Young-min left Jong-nam after discussing their project. Meanwhile, a young girl (Ahn-chae) was being bullied by another woman for "harassing her", while Hee-dong and Jeong-she watched on. Young-min was looking on far away.

Yujin had decided to leave her cousin's house to move into a new hostel. She met Ahn-chae, who came in to wash her face after moving her things into the new hostel room, number 102.

Young-min's sister looked at her CDs that were to be sold, for she was about to be wed off to her boyfriend and formally end her business...and her business was to be handed over to her friend.

Young-min ran back to the bench where he had left his things when he nearly reached home after spending a day with Jeong-an and Hee-dong and buying cloth for the arty that was to be held that night. He was happy to see his things which he had left there.

As Young-min was walking back home, he encountered the same girl (Ahn-chae) whom Yujin had introduced to him earlier, being harassed by a man near Yujin's hostel. The slap the man gave attracted Young-min attention.

As Ahn-chae walked away, the man shouted at Ahn-chae and snatched Ahn-chae to threaten violence. Young-min stepped in to pacify and asked for reasons to use violence, but was shaken off by the man as he gave chase. He grabbed the man, and the angry man asked him for what business has he got to do that. The man gave a swat at Young-min.

Young-min to fight the man, but ended up being kicked and punched and breaking his spectacles. He sustained minor bruises. The man left when he saw oncoming passersby. Before leaving, the man drove away and used his car tyres to roll over the bag which contained Young-min's things.

Meanwhile, Young-min's family and buddies were joined by his family with his elder sister's boyfriend, who were chatting away while waiting for Young-min.

Ahn-chae stood at one side, and Young-min sat down on the bench, trying to fix his spectacles and checking the condition of the things, but smiled despite his spectacles being broken. Ahn-chae went over to sit at the bench, and gave Young-min her handkerchief to wipe the blood away oozing from his injuries. Young-min looked at Ahn-chae before he left.

Hee-dong's elder sister left with her boyfriend in his car, as the entire family waved goodbye to the bosom couple. The sister asked the family to visit her whenever there is time. (This is the couple's last scene in the drama).

Young-min left Ahn-chae, and managed to get home after encountering difficulty on hailing a cab. His friends were a little surprised to see Young-min's in a state where he was carrying his torn bag, his curtain in his hands and his injuries, but only flashed a brief smile. He received a phonecall from Yujin that night.

Young-min met Renyu the next day, who asked about his lip injury, and Young-min gave a reply that he fell down. At this time, Young-min met Ahn-chae, who was walking past him, not looking at him, but Young-min looked on as she walked.

Hee-dong visited the CD-shop next day, and they had a brief conversation. Hee-dong met Jeong-she just as he was coming out, who had gone to an earlier meeting with Jong-nam and Yujin.

Young-min was reading the newspaper in the library as Jong-nam talked about her article that was published in the newspaper. Young-min kept reading other articles, before Jong-nam turned over the newspaper for Young-min to read it.

Young-min met Ahn-chae in the university compounds. Ahn-chae commented on his good looks without his spectacles on, and Young-min laughed as he walked holding onto his spectacles.

=== Episode 18 ===
Young-min waited for Ahn-chae outside the hostel. Just then, Yujin came back, and he called for her to look for Ahn-chae. A disappointed Young-min left the scene.

The group were discussing his relations with Ahn-chae the next day. Yujin looked solemnly at Young-min as she feared that she might miss her love... (Jong-nam was last seen here, thinking away and sitting on Yujin's right side).

Jeong-an received a parcel from a friend. She opened it to find a large toy chick, with Hee-dong's name written on it. Jeong-an grinned to herself.

Young-min met Ahn-chae that night. Ahn-chae criticised on his good life; not knowing of suffering when Young-min suggested not to take vengeance on her enemy.

Young-min realised that Ahn-chae had haemophilia after she dropped Young-min's book and cut her ring finger when she tried pick to it up. Young-min handed her a handkerchief to wipe the blood away from her wound. Ahn-chae confessed that her father was deceased as tears welled out of her eyes...

=== Episode 19 ===
The episode starts Young-min in his room. Young-min later went out with Fengguan and Hee-dong.

Hee-ju was seen dancing during a traditional Korean dance rehearsal. Hee-ju shocked to see Young-min as she removed her mask. The siblings later went for a coffee break, and revealed that she had only joined the dance troupe for a week, and that Fengguan and Hee-dong had quarrelled.

Hee-dong waved at Fengguan when they met in the library, but he just ignored him and walked past as a disappointed Hee-dong looked on.

Young-min met Ahn-chae with a boyfriend as they walked along. The show hopped into the next scene showing Fengguan sitting in the classroom, and Young-min came into strike up a conversation with him.

The class later attended a computer class. Everybody, except for Fengguan, appeared dumbfounded as he tried to approach his neighbouring partner for help. The neighbouring partner ignored him and Fengguan dabbed onto the keyboard solemnly.

Young-min saw Ahn-chae playing volleyball in the stadium. The subsequent scenes show Hee-ju having a conversation with Yujin at the bistro, and then Ahn-chae's close-up shots of playing volleyball. Young-min then left the scene.

Back home, Young-min put down his books and lied on the couch to rest. He was awaken upon seeing a mask in front of him, shocked. It was Hee-ju. She handed him the phone, a phonecall from Ahn-chae for a date. Hee-dong returned and had dinner with Hee-ju.

Young-min rushed to the scheduled destination. The pair talked about their first loves and their likes. Ahn-chae suggested to arrange a girlfriend for Young-min, but Young-min pushed off the offer.

Hee-ju and Yujin were walking along the street when they met Young-min walking with Ahn-chae walking past the other side. Yujin dismissed it as a matter of fact as the pair continued their way. A subsequent scene later showed Ahn-chae working in pizza hut.

Ahn-chae had returned home, and were talking about their careers and Young-min. A friend who was to meet Ahn-chae came into the room.

Fengguan checked at his body appearance on a mirror (the other side was a mirror) to prepare for his first date. The female guests looked on as Fengguan entered the bistro, where Hanna, Yujin's friend, was waiting for him. (This is Hanna's first appearance). He appeared rather tense and anxious as he talked to Han-na.

Fengguan was talking to Hanna about his anxious attitude (towards meeting her) when he spilt his water onto the table and his pants. Han-na immediately handed him a packet of tissue paper.

The next scene lapses into Young-min walking along with Yujin, as they talked about their assignments. Hee-dong met Jeong-an and ran after her. He handed her a bag, and told her to open it only when she reaches home.

Fengguan talked about religion and their friends with Han-na as they walked home. Fengguan reached home to see Hee-dong and Hee-ju watching television.

Jeong-an went home to open the package Hee-dong gave and felt angry upon seeing a man's brief. The next scene lapses Young-min and Yujin watching a piano concert.

The next day, Hee-dong peeped behind a wall to give Jeong-an a surprise. He apologised for giving the wrong package the previous day, and suggested an exchange.

Young-min was studying in the library with Renyu when they met Ahn-chae. She turned away when Young-min turned his head around. Young-min went to the lakeside, and found Ahn-chae sitting on a bench. Ahn-chae criticised Young-min of his relationship with Yujin, and revealed that she heard from Yujin that he had gone to a piano concert with her. With that, Ahn-chae got up to leave.

As she left, Young-min called out and asked for reasons for apology. Ahn-chae turned around, and said that he was a liar whom she could no longer trust.

That night, Young-min went to see Ahn-chae at Pizza Hut, but went off after that. The next scene showed Ahn-chae humming as she walked home. Ahn-chae sat down on a bench at the bottom of the staircase, and closed her eyes...

=== Episode 20 ===
The episode opens with Ahn-chae preparing a pizza. In a narration, Ahn-chae describes her pleasure of doing her job as a waitress at Pizza Hut. Back home, she spotted some photos featuring Young-min with Yujin.

Yujin visited Young-min's home to work on a school project on linguistics. Fengguan asked for reasons Ahn-chae absentee.

In the hostel, Yujin shared her experiences about Young-min with Ahn-chae. Ahn-chae thought to herself for a while, before she suggested to dust the room. Yujin offered her help and Ahn-chae declined it. Yujin reported that she had lost her report, and asked Ahn-chae whether she had accidentally threw it away. Ahn-chae vehemently denied the incident as she rummaged through Yujin's table.

Yujin looked for Young-min at the library, and informed him of the loss of the report. Young-min suggested that they would rewrite the report. Fengguan defended by saying that they had reached the dateline.

The lecturer entered the classroom, and told the pupils to hand in their reports. The topic that was to be discussed, "우리生活속의 言語現象" was written on the chalkboard.

The students are then told to make a speech on their report; Renyu confessed that he did his report by himself. The speeches went on, and the students laughed while the teacher marked their reports. Finally, Young-min, Fengguan and Yujin were singled out. The lecturer asked for the report, and just as Yujin was thinking for an answer, Young-min bravely spoke out to formally request for the lecturers' permission to give them another week to complete the project. Fengguan later owned up under the lecturer's discretion.

The trio walked out of the classroom, looking rather disappointed. Fengguan brought up the fact that the lecturer's merciless behaviour was the reason for being single, and the friends laughed at the joke. Ahn-chae walked up to Yujin, and apologised. Young-min, looking confused, looked on as Ahn-chae walked away.

Yujin proceeded to Jeong-an's room, and revealed that she had nearly forgotten on the outlook of her room.

Meanwhile, Renyu ran up to Ahn-chae as she was walking. Renyu talked about the content of his report, and suggested Ahn-chae to play tennis with him in the tennis court.

The duo played together. At a point, Renyu was seen teaching Ahn-chae the correct techniques for hitting a ball. On the walkway at the top, Hee-ju saw Ahn-chae's attitude towards Renyu and left her friends for home.

Ahn-chae invited some of her friends to her hostel room, and Yujin came back. The next scene hops into Yujin doing her own work as Ahn-chae came in...

Yujin took ill, and her cousin Jeong-an visited her. One scene showed Jeong-an dabbing Yujin's head in the room.

Ahn-chae was serving pizza to a customer, but was being scolded for not giving sufficient mushrooms. She stated that there will be a surcharge, which made the customer very angry. While serving pizza to the customer, Ahn-chae dropped the pizza and landed on the customer's dress. Ahn-chae suggested on compensating with a new pizza.

Ahn-chae returned home, feeling depressed. Yujin woke up, and saw Ahn-chae arranging her things. Yujin switched on the light and talked on until they went to bed...

=== Episode 21 ===
Young-min and his classmates faced a new old lecturer, who instructed his students to write a brief biography. Many of his classmates took no interest in him, and some even laughed. Meanwhile, Young-min burst into the classroom.

After lecture, Young-min approached the lecturer to retrieve his lost lessons, but found the lecturer sleeping. When Young-min was about to leave, he was called back by the lecturer. At this point, the lecturer took interest on Young-min, after he went to consult the professor.

The professor seized the opportunity to do some work by packing books. The professor, though strict and harsh in attitude, treated him with interest as he offered some chewing gum. Young-min rejected (politely) and the professor went on to play some classical music. Young-min looked on and smiled before he proceed onto his work. Before he left, Young-min accidentally dropped the Professor's saxophone, and was being reprimanded.

Young-min left home and realised that he had left his wallet at the professor's office. Young-min decided that he would return to the office to retrieve his wallet. Young-min was surprised to find the professor's office's door unlocked and found the professor playing his saxophone on his own in the midst of the night.

Young-min stood at the door, and walked forward. He waited until the professor finished his tune, before asking for permission to search for his wallet. The professor, seeing the situation, showed him the wallet. Young-min heaved a sigh of relief and thanked the professor.

The professor then suggested Young-min to dine with him in the campus' canteen. The professor had a friendly conversation at first; commenting that the canteen's food is always the best and his marital status (he was still a bachelor).

The professor made a criticising remark on Young-min being stupid and not having the potential to listen to his lectures. Young-min was offended by his remarks and made his defence, saying that the professor's remarks were too unreasonable, and made his defence on the spot. The professor, offended by Young-min's defence, scolded him and told him not to attend his lectures again for being chiding on his words. With that, the professor left Young-min.

Young-min walked home while it was raining. He met Ahn-chae, who was being drenched by the rain. Young-min rushed forward, and walked together with their umbrella. Ahn-chae thanked and left Young-min as she ran into a nearby shelter.

Young-min went home, and reflected on his deeds. The next day, Young-min happened to meet the professor who bypassed him, and called him. The professor ignored him, but Young-min chased after him. In his statement, Young-min apologised for the incident, but remained indignant that the remarks the professor gave were unreasonable. The professor told him not to attend his class in a fit of anger. Young-min felt looked on, feeling remorseful and humiliated.

The class were glad to hear that a young, new lecturer, who had just graduated would be taking over the lessons of the old professor from that day onwards, except for Young-min, who felt rather sorry for his plight. The old professor walked out of the classroom, with his head bowed down, and Young-min looked on as the new lecturer started his lessons.

After the lecture, Young-min went to the professor's office to look for him, but found that the entire room was vacant and all his things were gone. A lecturer came to inform that the old professor had already left the campus. Young-min felt heartbroken upon hearing the news. He found the professor's saxophone on top of the cupboard, and took it with him.

Young-min sat on a seat around the tennis court, and opened the saxophone. Young-min tried to blow the saxophone, but produced no sound. He tried for a few times repeatedly, still not able to produce any music. Young-min put the saxophone back into the box...

=== Episode 22 ===
This episode shows Jeong-eun, who was dating with another boy, stricken with brain fever.

Jeong-she's condition began to waiver while she was having a meal with her boyfriend and again while at the discothèque. Her boyfriend, who was about to eat food at the bistro, rejected it upon hearing that she was about to be hospitalised. Finally, she went to Ahn-chae's house to collapse, on the bed. Ahn-chae and Yujin later returned to discover that Jeong-eun was very sick, unconscious.

Jeong-she was sent to hospital by her friends. Young-min and Hee-dong came rushing to see Jeong-eun who was already in bed.

While in bed, Hee-dong watched his girlfriend who was very sick, and gave her toys to play. Xiuzhen then expressed her desire for cappuccino to Hee-dong. Without hesitation, Hee-dong showed her a packet of sugar as well as a box of cappuccino coffee powder, in spite of knowing that she was unable to take cappuccino.

As Hee-dong was preparing cappuccino at the hospital lobby and was singing, Young-min came into the scene. The next scene lapses into Jeong-she Hee-dong decided to spend the night with Young-min, who was sitting in the waiting area at the hospital. Young-min consoled Hee-dong that Jeong-she will be alright as he drank the cappuccino Hee-dong brewed, and was surprised that it what he drank was only sugar water.

The episodes closes as Young-min comments on his poor dancing skills and asks for Hee-dong's instructions to learn dancing.

=== Episode 23 ===
The episode opens with Fengxi, Hong-guan's perverse elder brother, was quarrelling with a taxi driver over the price of his taxi fare. Hong-shee greeted Young-min as he got out of the taxi. Hong-shee was taken to Young-min's home, and his younger sister was introduced to Fengxi.

In a later scene, Hong-shee as seen sleeping on the floor with his limbs open. Hee-dong, who had just returned home, was surprised to see Fengxi and used his hand to see if he's really asleep.

A night scene showed Hong-shee and Hong-guan sleeping together, and Hee-dong went to sleep with Young-min. In another scene, Hong-shee was shown smoking in the midst of the night, and the cigarette smoke woke Hong-guan up. Fengxi teased his brother by blowing cigarette smoke at him. An angry Hong-guan demanded his elder brother to sleep, as Hong-shee was blowing cigarette smoke to form smoke rings.

Hong-guan switched off the lights for bed and ignored his brother who was still sleeping. Hong-shee, who saw stars in the sky as he wandered his eyes around the room, jumped into bed hugged his brother.

The next morning, Hong-shee woke up while his brother was still sleeping. Fengguan searched his brother's bag and found a toothbrush and toothpaste before a document showing his profile appeared. In the document, Hong-shee was to take some examinations in an unspecified campus.

Hong-shee was introduced to the university campus in which the three friends were studying in. As he walked, several scenes showed him starring at girls wherever he went. Hong-shee soon settled down for lunch and was joined by Hee-dong and Hong-guan. Hong-shee commented on the size of the campus as well as the taste of the food.

Hong-shee hung out at a cafe at night and caught sight of Ahn-chae as he was smoking. He waited hung out in the streets until the next day and treated Young-min and friends to celebrate Hong-guan's twenty-second birthday at the same cafe.

Young-min and his friends are the first ones to arrive. Hong-guan was walking along the streets with his girlfriend when he received a phonecall from his brother to the cake shop. The couple decided to buy a birthday cake.

Hong-guan realised that he has to hand up the project after they bought the cake. He instructed Hena to go over to their scheduled destination first as he hands up his project.

The next scene shows Hena entering the cafe. Hong-shee was rather surprised when he saw that it was Hongguan's girlfriend. As they waited for Hong-guan, Hong-shee played a game of "predicting luck" by looking at the friend's hand. On one occasion, Hong-shee said that Hee-dong has the potential to live a hundred years, and went on to read Hong-shee's girlfriend's hands. She was noted for being disappointed upon hearing that her relationship with every boyfriend may not last, but felt relieved when it was a joke.

In the meantime, Hong-guan was rushing towards his destination when he decided to call on his family. In the telephone conversation, Hongguan's parents and grandpa were introduced into the drama.

Hong-guan arrived at the cafe where his friends were waiting. A birthday celebration was held.

Later that night, Hong-shee brought his friends to a pub, and sang all night in a KTV box with an unruly behaviour. All of Young-min's friends took his behaviour as a humour, but Hong-guan and his girlfriend were unable to take his behaviour well. This was made worse when Hong-shee attempted to pull Hongguan's girlfriend onto stage, and she left the pub while Hong-shee pulled out Ahn-chae to sing with him.

Hong-guan female buddies later told them to return to the pub. Hong-hee later quarrelled with the pub manager for being unable to pay, and Young-min stepped out to pay the manager instead, but was with difficulty when he realised that he was short of money, and suggested to pay the manager the next day. The manager reluctantly agreed and said some sour words.

Hong-guan took the opportunity to criticise his brother's unruly behaviour while he was with their friends. An angry Hong-shee grabbed his younger brother by the collar, in front of all his friends. Hong-shee ordered Hong-guan to get out of the house and discuss his change in behaviour.

Hong-shee sat down on an elevated platform, and Hongguan suggested Hong-shee to find a job. Hong-shee threw his cigarette and got up, and told Hong-guan that university students have a better chance of getting a job. Hong-guan then told his brother to soften his tone, and got a slap in return. Hong-shee then continued that Fengguan was being more emphasised by their parents than to Hong-shee, and that he should not be looked down upon by Hong-guan for that.

In response, Hong-guan criticised his brother for not finding a job. Hongshee looked a bit remorse, and scolded Hong-guan for being a "softie", who would only feed on the spoon, and that educated people like him are being pampered by his parents. Hong-guan responded that he got to university by his own merit, and that he should not be treated like this by Hongshee as a whipping boy. The brothers turned their heads away before Hongshee left. Hong-guan sobbed.

Hong-guan returned home. At night, Fengguan talked about his childhood days to his bosom friends. On one occasion, his brother would calm him down when he cried at night while catching seafood. The next scene lapses into Fengxi sitting on a swing smoking a cigarette, with his head bowed down.

The next day, Hongshee returned home. As he saw Hee-ju cooking, he took a mouthful of meat to eat, and Hee-ju was told to brush his teeth. Fengxi flashed a smile in response, and left before the rest woke up, and Hee-ju handed an envelope to Hong-guan.

Hong-guan looked for his brother, and went as far to the bus station. He opened the envelope, and found a farewell letter and 50,000 won (In 10,000 denominations). He is joined by Hena, who spent the remaining time with him....

=== Episode 24 ===
The episode starts as Ahn-chae runs forward to Young-min for a few words, and tripped into the hedge as she walked towards it. She was facing Young-min when it happened. Young-min, seeing the accident, broke into laughter as he went forward to help Ahn-chae.

Inyo, who saw the commotion from the library's window, was feeling jealous to see a person he liked was being contested by another lover.

Back home, Hee-ju, who had been preparing her exams all night, woke up the following day to find that she was late for exams. "Elder brother, why didn't you wake me up? I'm going to be late for school!" She exclaimed and went on to pack her bag before she left.

Inyo took his opportunity for revenge by stealing Hee-dong, Fengguan and Hae-ahn past examination scripts from them after Young-min left their scripts (including Minyu's) at the library counter. He returned to the library, glanced around occasionally, hid their papers in his bag and started studying his script.

The three friends went to collect their papers, but found out that it was lost. The three friends, who were disappointed, went out for a stroll and analysed whether Young-min used tricks to hide the papers. Hee-dong and Fengguan accused Young-min of stealing the papers, but Hae-eun stated that there might be some other external sources. They proceeded to the classroom for exams.

In school, Hee-ju and her classmates were doing last minute preparations for examinations. Hee-ju realised that she was unable to absorb all the facts within a short period of time and copied notes. During the examinations, she hid the notes under the examination scripts to use for reference, but was caught by the invigilator while referring to the notes.

As the analysed the reasons who the examination scripts were lost, Young-min came into the classroom to greet his friends. He was surprised to see the three friends looking at him in a hostile manner. Hee-dong even went as far as to snatch Young-min's examination scripts and made disdainful remarks about his good results. Young-min was surprised that their scripts were missing, but Hee-dong took Young-min's genuinity of his feelings as a mere disguise to hide his guilt.

In a scene that shows the examination, Yujin, Hee-dong and Hong-guan looked rather lost as gave occasional glances at Young-min, who was working at the examination script. Young-min looked rather sorry for their plight.

After the examinations, the trio continued to make disdainful remarks which Yujin defended Young-min. Hee-dong suddenly brought up the point that Inyo did not went of the examinations, an awkward occasion as Inyo would always attend for examinations. Fengguan rushed into the classroom to see if Inyo is still in the classroom, but found nobody there, and Hee-dong joined in the show.

The trio then brought up another point that one of them had met Inyo at the school library on the same day. Hee-dong suggested that the matter is to be forgotten as there is nothing that could be done to repair the damages, as the examinations were already over.

Young-min decides to go to the library on his own after the examinations. Meanwhile, Inyo woke up and realised that the examinations were over after he looked at the clock: 3.05pm. Renyu quickly gathered his stationery without even packing his things or bringing his bag along.

Meanwhile, Young-min's friends suggested to go for the upcoming 4.19 km marathon for a change. Young-min, feeling suspicious that Renyu might be the culprit, went to the library to check out on Renyu. A curious Young-min walked towards his seat and looked through his things, and found his friends' papers.

Inyo was very shocked and upset when he realised that all his classmates were gone when he reached the classroom. Inyo walked back to the library, and saw Young-min looking at the stolen papers. As Young-min turned around to give an angry glance at Inyo, he looked onto the floor with guilt.

The next scene showed the marathon, and Han-na running together with Hongguan. Hongguan shared his experience on running during his childhood days. Han-na told him to slow down, but Hong-guan insisted. Han-na asked for whereabouts about Hee-dong, who were running behind them, with Hee-ju. Hee-dong was criticising Hee-ju for cheating in exams, and that she would get a zero in her paper. Hee-ju stopped, and Hee-dong tagged her along and told her that it was a bitter experience for her. As Hee-dong started off, Hee-ju gave chase.

Young-min looked rather relaxed as he walked out of the building with a perplexed Renyu and asked for reasons about his act. Jo Renyu told Young-min that he was just referring at the friends papers, and did not acknowledge his mistake. As Inyo tried to walk away from Young-min, he was being pulled backwards.

Young-min held him by the shoulder, smiling away as he led Renyu to the signup post for the 4.19 km marathon that the trio were already engaged in. "The race has already long started, but you may catch up with the rest if you run a bit faster", the manager told Young-min. A reluctant Inyo and Young-min had their hands stamped to get permission to join the marathon. Young-min pulled Renyu's right hand to tag him along, and told him to hurry to meet Hongguan.

Towards the ending point, the participants ran on. Hongguan was faltering, and Han-na asked whether he was exhausted. Han-na suggested that they should rest a while, but Hongguan refused and vehemently denied that he was tired. Han-na handed Hongguan a handkerchief to wipe away his sweat. Three participants caught up and overtook them just as Han-na said that they were to be the first in position. Hee-dong and Hee-ju were running at the back, and Hee-ju complained that she was tired. Hee-dong confided Hee-ju to build her confidence. Hee-dong then offered to treat her for dinner if they could finish the marathon. The duo boosted up their speed.

Not far off from the starting point, the duo ran as Young-min watched closely at Inyo, who continuously denied his mistake and complained that many passersby were looking at them. Young-min told Renyu to increase their speed to catch up with the rest. Young-min then mocked at Inyo, asking him whether he felt good on running. Inyo eyed at him, and Young-min said that he deserved such a retribution for doing a bad deed. Inyo angrily asked him, and pulled Young-min back as he increased his speed. They stopped for a split second before running again. Young-min then remarked that Inyo had thick skin, which led to a quarrel to justify Inyo's deed.

Renyu stopped as Young-min ran on, as he felt rather tired out and was unable to run, and Young-min stopped and looked back. Leaning against a tree, Inyo acknowledged his mistake and apologised as Young-min stood beside him and asked if he had acknowledged his wrongdoing. Young-min dragged him along, and held Renyu by the shoulder as they started off. As they ran, Young-min tried to hold Inyo by the shoulder, but he pushed off.

The trio had finally reached the end point as Fengguan collapsed onto the floor out of sheer exhaustion. They were followed by Hee-dong and Hee-ju, who also followed suit. The sound from the drums used by the traditional Korean dance troupe rang into the sky as the friends cheered a cry of triumph.

Young-min ran as he smiled at Inyo, who returned angry glances back at Young-min.

=== Episode 25 ===
The last episode features on Ahn-chae's events leading to her escape back to her homeland. Ahn-chae was shopping along the streets. After shopping, she decided to return home, and the bus had just reached the bus stop not very far off from where she was walking.

Ahn-chae ran after the bus, but broke the right heel of her high-heel shoes. The bus left, and Ahn-chae gave a disappointed look. Looking at the condition of her shoe, Ahn-chae decided that she would buy a new pair of shoes for herself, a pair of black shoes which appealed to her.

Ahn-chae went to work the next day as usual at Pizza Hut the next day, but was reprimanded by her manager for miscalculation of the prices of pizzas to ten customers while showing off her new shoes to her colleagues. While serving the customers, Ahn-chae met three ruffians who tried to tease her. Ahn-chae gave a nasty reply when the ruffians suggested to date with her.

The angry ruffians complained to the shop's manager, who immediately demanded an apology on behalf of the ruffians. Ahn-chae refused, and said that the ruffians teased her. The ruffians, on seeing the quarrel that was about to break out, left the shop.

The manager gave a good scolding, complained that her unruly behaviour would turn customers away, and business would deteriorate. Ahn-chae decided to resign, and walked off as the manager threw criticisms.

Dusk had fallen as Ahn-chae walked home. Ahn-chae felt something was bothering her movements in her right shoe, and took out her shoe to find that her right ankle was bleeding, an injury caused by the shoe. Ahn-chae put down her handbag to attend to her wounds.

The next scene shows Ahn-chae in her room, having just returned. Ahn-chae lied down on her bed, looking pale. Yujin was surprised to see that Ahn-chae did not bring her handbag with her. Ahn-chae, who suddenly remembered that she had left her handbag behind after attending to her wounds. "Oh dear! My salary! How could I have forgotten?" She exclaimed as she left. When Ahn-chae returned to that spot, it was gone.

The next day, Young-min, Fengguan, Minyu, Ahn-chae, Hee-ju, Hee-dong and Han-na held a feast at Ahn-chae's work place as a group. After waiting for a long time, Young-min, who concluded that Ahn-chae did not turn up for the meeting, looked worried. Young-min called back to Ahn-chae's lodge, but found out that she was not at home.

Young-min held a strong suspicion that Ahn-chae must have returned to her hometown and decided that the group would look for her there. The group was indignant, but relented after Young-min stressed on team-spirit. With that, they took a train to Ahn-chae's homeland from Chongnyang station.

The group went around to look for Ahn-chae once they got off the train. Except for Young-min, the group decided to camp at a place near the river, while Young-min went over to Ahn-chae's home. He called for Ahn-chae, but there was no reply. As he walked down the streets, Young-min found Ahn-chae waiting for a bus. He called out to Ahn-chae, who looked rather surprised. Young-min told her that the entire group had come to her hometown to look for her.

Meanwhile, Renyu and Hee-dong were assigned to buy groceries for dinner. Renyu was later reassigned to buy rice grains for dinner. After buying the rice, Renyu decided to give a call to Ahn-chae's house, only to find that she was not at home. Renyu nearly left without bringing the rice along. Renyu returned to take the rice, but the entire packet dropped onto the ground as he took the handle. He collected whatever lost rice he could into the plastic bag.

Young-min asked on Ahn-chae's inconsiderate and insensitive behaviour throughout the entire journey on the train. He offered a can of coffee to her. When they embarked, Young-min tried to hold her hand, but Ahn-chae shook off and said that she could walk on her own.

Renyu went back to the base and looked rather embarrassed when Hanna asked for reasons on the reduction of the amount of rice.

Ahn-chae walked along the river with Young-min, and ignored Young-min whenever he called her. As they walked, Ahn-chae gave a cold look at Young-min as he called and grabbed her hand. When asked for reasons on her inconsiderate behaviour, she argued that she was analysing why she was so cold.

Suddenly, Ahn-chae cried out in pain, due in part to the injury caused by her shoe. Young-min bent down to attend to her wounds, and in doing so, Ahn-chae got up and threw one of her shoes into her river and nearly with the other. Young-min immediately scolded Ahn-chae's actions, and argued that it would be unsafe to walk without shoes. Following that, Young-min jumped into the river to retrieve her shoe.

Ahn-chae looked on, feeling worried that Young-min would drown in the process. Young-min returned her shoe as he swam back.

Ahn-chae thanked Young-min, but criticised him for his deeds as he picked up her shoe at his own accord. Young-min angrily rebutted that her indignance and stubbornness had made her a lonely girl. Young-min even went further that he had tolerated her behaviour all along and even fallen in love with her, but was unable to tolerate her behaviour any longer. Ahn-chae gave a look of remorse at Young-min.

"I had wanted to bring you back to our group, but I give in. You may come to my place as you wish, but I'm not forcing you." With that, Young-min left as Ahn-chae sat down on a rock to reflect on her attitude. She put her shoes beside her.

Young-min arrived at the base where the group were waiting, and they were having dinner. He ate greedily, as the group asked Young-min for his report on the lost time. Hee-dong called him a hungry ghost as he wrapped some rice up in a lettuce.

The group sat around a campfire after dinner and sang a song. They talked about their past experiences under Fengguan's request. Fengguan played the guitar, as the rest of the group pestered what happened during the lost time. Young-min made out some stories to evade talking about Ahn-chae's nasty encounter. The group went on to talk their experiences, as Young-min looked at Yujin. A train passed through the railway tracks above them, and Renyu talked about his experiences on getting the final position in class. Young-min looked at the extinguishing fire.

The group decided to return to their motel after the campfire, and sang "When we were together". They met Ahn-chae at the doorstep, who looked rather pleasant, who asked for some food.

The next scene lapses into Young-min conversing and standing along the river with Ahn-chae. Ahn-chae looked apologetic as she revealed her experiences on her previous day and the reasons for running back to her hometown; her childhood days with her late mother.

I lost my handbag the day before as I looked at the wound I sustained from the shoe. The handbag contained my salary, and I was feeling very upset at that time as I had also lost my job.

Ahn-chae also went on to describe her feelings as she thought about herself not wearing any shoes and ran off, and apologise for her bad attitude as they felt the gentle waves of the river water. Both Young-min and Ahn-chae looked into each other eyes before Young-min hugged Ahn-chae. As they hugged, they had found out their true love.

== Cast ==
- Bae Yong-joon - Kim Young-min
  - The lead role in the drama. He was born in 1975. Young-min was elected as the group leader among his group of friends (all the major characters in the drama), and his powers apply in the fields of project work by the university that his friends are studying in, and to an extent, holidays. Young-min is the childhood friend of Hae-yung, but she later broke up with him during their university days. He went on to develop relationships with Jong-nam, Yujin and Ahn-chae. Young-min had an elder sister, Yeon-ae.
- Kwon Oh-joong - Won Hee-dong
  - The relative of Kim, possibly the brother of his. The most enthusiastic and hyperactive person among their friends. Hee-dong joined the W.O.W band group at one time, but a minor accident terminated his career. The boyfriend of Jeong-she.
- Park Jun-hee - Gang Ahn-chae
  - Ahn-chae first made her appearance in episode 17. A temperamental and conservative girl. Initially harassed by many people around her, but Young-min helped her up. She later worked as a waitress in Pizza Hut, but resigned due to social problems. Ahn-chae became the love bird of Young-min by the final episode. A roommate with Yujin.
- Kim Ji-ho - Jegal Jong-nam
  - Jong-nam, whose brother had died in a car accident, leaving her to be the breadwinner of the family. A quick-tempered girl. Later left the group around Episode 18, which somewhat pleased many of the group members.
- Sung Hyun-ah - Hae-yung
  - Hae-yung is the childhood friend of Young-min, and they came from the same village somewhere in Korea. She was born in 1975, the same year as with Young-min. She later developed relations with Jingguan, a student leader, from episode 3 onwards. This was partially caused by Young-min lack of confession on his love to her. She made her last appearance in episode 8, after developing a stable relation with Jingguan.
- Lee Eun-soo - Jeong-ah
  - The girlfriend of Hee-dong. She made her first appearance in episode 7 and the last in episode 23. Jeong-ah previously had a relationship with another boyfriend, a punkster. Later fell gravely ill and had to be hospitalised for some time.
- Park Jeong-mi - Yeon-ae
  - Elder sister of Young-min and Hee-dong. Ran a shop selling music CDs and LDs. She dated with a man, but found out that he was married. Yeon-ae later dated Shin Jun-yong, a long time friend, and later handed her shop business to a friend and went to live with Shin.
- Kim Min-hee - Hee-ju
  - The younger sister of Hee-dong, Young-min and Yeon-ae. Made her first appearance in episode 15, when their father sent her to the university Young-min and his friends were studying in. Took over as the family cook when Yeon-ae left to leave with Jun-yong.
- Lee Ui-jeong - Mae-na
  - Roommate of Hae-yung. Made her final appearance in episode 7, at the bistro. A small, short girl with poor health. She is a native of Quanzhou.
- Kim Kyung-eung - Lee Hong-guan
  - A best friend and relative of Young-min. A studious boy who excels academically. Has a relatively poorer performance in physical exercises and dance. Developed a relationship with Han-na. Has an aunt in Quanzhou and a dissolute and ill-educated older brother, Hong-shee. He is born in 1974, a year older than many of the friends.
- Kim Kyung-eun - Lee Yujin
  - The cousin of Jeong-ah. She came from America. Developed a relationship with Young-min coincidentally partially under the direction of Jeong-ah, and lived with her until episode 17, in which she moved out to a new hostel to live with Ahn-chae.
- Kim Kwang-young - Jo Inyo
  - A studious boy, inquisitive and highly competitive, academically by nature. Renyu is also a selfish and rebellious boy, especially against his mother. He is well liked by many teachers and rarely failed to attend lectures. He has attempted to date several girls in the group, but gave up after minor setbacks.
- Yoon Son-ha - Han-na
  - The girlfriend of Hong-guan. Similar in character with Hong-guan, caring and docile by nature. Made her first appearance in episode 19.
- Kim Byung-doo - Jianyu
  - A photographer and a student of the university. Had several girlfriends in the past. Made several brief appearances from episode 1–4.
- Son Hyun-joo - Friend of Jeon-woo
  - Made two brief appearances in episode 2 as he approached Fengguan, under Jianyu's introduction for help to make a documentary on a farmer's life to modernism under Fengguan's introduction. Hong-guan refused his proposal.
- Bae Doh-hwan - Taxi driver
  - He made a brief appearance in episode 23 as a taxi driver who bargained with Hongshee for the taxi fare.

== Trivia ==
- Bae Yong-joon (who played Young-min) nearly drowned in the river during filming. According to Bae, the director thought he was initially playing in the water, not knowing that he was about to drown. This incident happened in the scene where Young-min jumped into the river to fish out the shoe Ahn-chae threw in.
- Salut D'Amour was Bae's, Kwon Oh-joong's, Kim Ji-ho's and Park Jun-hee's debut drama.
- Bae later played Choi Hyun-joon in the 1996 Korean drama Papa as the author of the Korean version of Salut D'Amour. The strong correlation between both dramas is evidenced in one scene in episode three of Papa, during which Choi (Bae) is having a meeting about his new book. The Korean words "사랑의 인사" are written on the display signboard for the meeting.

== Soundtrack ==
- "Salut d'Amour" by Edward Elgar
- "It Must Have Been Love" (played at the ending of the final episode)

== See also ==
- List of Korean television shows
- Korean drama
- Contemporary culture of South Korea
