= Shin Dong-hyuk (footballer) =

South Korean footballer (born 1987)

Personal information
- Date of birth: 17 July 1987 (age 39)
- Place of birth: South Korea
- Height: 1.76 m (5 ft 9 1/2 in)
- Position: Midfielder

Team information
- Current team: Daejeon Citizen
- Number: 17

Senior career*
| Years | Team | Apps | (Gls) |
| 2010 | Ulsan Hyundai | 0 | (0) |
| 2011–2012 | Incheon United | 1 | (0) |
| 2014– | Daejeon Citizen | 3 | (0) |
- * Club domestic league appearances and goals as of 17 November 2014

- Shin Dong-hyuk
- Hangul: 신동혁
- Hanja: 申東奕
- RR: Sin Donghyeok
- MR: Sin Tonghyŏk

Shin Dong-hyuk (Korean: 신동혁; born 17 July 1987) is a South Korean football midfielder, who formerly played for Incheon United.

== Club career ==
Shin joined Incheon United for the 2011 season, and his first league appearance for his new club was as a substitute against Gyeongnam FC, playing most of the second half of the match.

== Club career statistics ==
As of 14 September 2013

| Club performance | | | League | | Cup | | League Cup | | Total | |
| Season | Club | League | Apps | Goals | Apps | Goals | Apps | Goals | Apps | Goals |
| South Korea | | | League | | KFA Cup | | League Cup | | Total | |
|---|---|---|---|---|---|---|---|---|---|---|
| 2011 | Incheon United | K-League | 1 | 0 | 0 | 0 | 3 | 0 | 4 | 0 |
| 2012 | Incheon United | K-League | 0 | 0 | 0 | 0 | - | | 0 | 0 |
| Career total | | | 1 | 0 | 0 | 0 | 3 | 0 | 4 | 0 |
