= Shin Dong-hyuk (Hotelier) =

Shin Dong-hyuk (also known as Frank Shin) is a fictional character portrayed by Bae Yong-joon in the 2001 South Korean television drama series Hotelier. The character also appeared in a cameo appearance in the Japanese version television series of the same name, which was produced by Asahi TV.

== Role of character ==
Shin was an attorney and takeover businessman of M&A, and is a Korean American. As a child, he had emigrated from South Korea to the United States.

He was first ordered by Kim Bok-man as an agent to infiltrate as a double agent and buy over the shares of Seoul Hotel. A shareholder of Hankang distribution, Kim had warned his old friend Choi that he wanted to swallow up Seoul Hotel, which resulted in a heart attack that killed Choi. Shin was subsequently ordered by Kim from Las Vegas to do the necessary to buy over Seoul Hotel, and at the same time he rented a motel room in the very hotel that he wanted to infiltrate. While in America, Shin first met and picked up Jin Hyung who flagged down his Limousine, after being marooned in the desert when she had a tiff with Tae Jun.

After much deliberation, Shin decided to take up Kim's offer and returned to Korea along with his personal assistant Leo, also a Korean American. During his stay in Korea, Shin developed romantic feelings towards Jin-hyung, and eventually forgotten his original motive of swallowing up the hotel's shares. Shortly after Tae Jun's return to Korea, he discovered that Tae Jun (who was also his rival) took care of a girl named Jenny (also known by her Korean name Dong Hee), who turned out to be his long lost sister. Both siblings later met their father, who by then was a despot.

Shin, upon learning Tae Jun's efforts to discipline and taking care of Jenny, decided to put down his rivalry towards him. At this juncture, he decided to confront Kim to give up his plans of buying over Seoul Hotel and this infuriated Kim, only to get a punch and (nearly) walloped by Kim's golf stick, only to be saved by Kim's daughter, Yoon Hee, when she grabbed her father's hand as he prepared to swing the golf stick onto Shin's face. Both Tae Jun and Young Jae were in the background, and witnessed the entire scene.

== Role of character in Japanese version ==
Shin reappeared as a minor role in the Japanese version of Hotelier, produced by TV Asahi, and was seen mainly in the first episode as well as a few cameo appearances in some of the subsequent episodes. In the Japanese version, he was a hotelier expert working in the M&A company, and Odagiri Kyoko (played by Ueto Aya) approached Shin for advice after the manager of Tokyo Ocean Hotel fell ill at the time when it went into a period of financial crisis.
