= Korean drama =

Television programs from South Korea

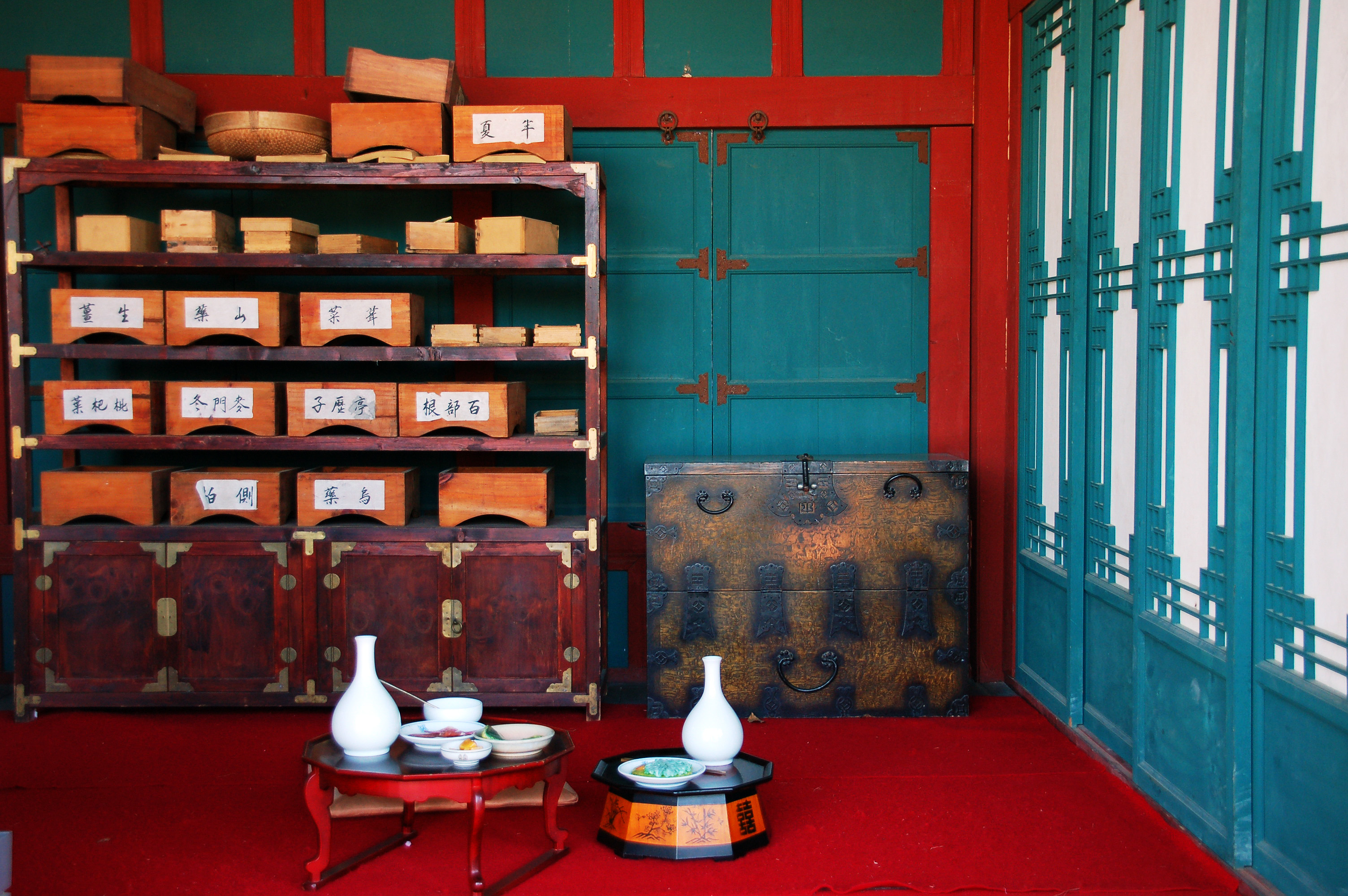
A set of the Korean drama Jewel in the Palace (2003–2004) at Dae Jang Geum Theme Park

A Korean drama (Korean: 한국 드라마; RR: Hanguk deurama), also known as a K-drama and Koreanovela, is a Korean-language television show made in South Korea. These shows began to be produced around the early 1960s, but were mostly consumed domestically until the rise of the Korean Wave in the 1990s. They have since achieved significant international popularity, with millions of viewers across the world.

Beginning around the 1970s, more and more households in South Korea owned televisions. Programs were often produced on low budgets and were mostly consumed domestically. The industry significantly developed in the 1980s, after the spread of color television. Beginning in the early 1990s, several Korean dramas began achieving significant international popularity, primarily in China and Japan. In addition, South Korean popular music ("K-pop") and films began seeing similar successes, which gave rise to rapid international adoption of South Korean media in a phenomenon commonly called the Korean Wave. In the following decades, viewership spread throughout the globe. Rapid growth continued into the 2010s, with the rise in online streaming. Around this period, the American video streaming company Netflix took an interest in the phenomenon, and began releasing Korean dramas on its platform, as well as creating and funding newer such works. This culminated in the release of the 2021 Squid Game, which was watched by more than 142 million households in its first four weeks. In 2022, Netflix reported that 60 percent of its 221 million subscribers had watched a Korean program in the last year.

The success of Korean dramas has had a significant economic impact on South Korea. In 2022, US$561 million of Korean television content was sold abroad, which was a 30% increase from the previous year, surpassing those of South Korea's major export items such as secondary batteries and electric vehicles. The industry also employs tens of thousands of people. Korean dramas have also been cited as a motivation for tourists to visit the country.

== History ==
=== Beginnings and early years ===
Radio broadcasting, including the broadcasting of radio dramas in Korea, began in 1927 under Japanese rule, with most programming in Japanese and around 30% in Korean. After the Korean War, radio dramas such as Cheongsilhongsil (1954) reflected the country's mood.

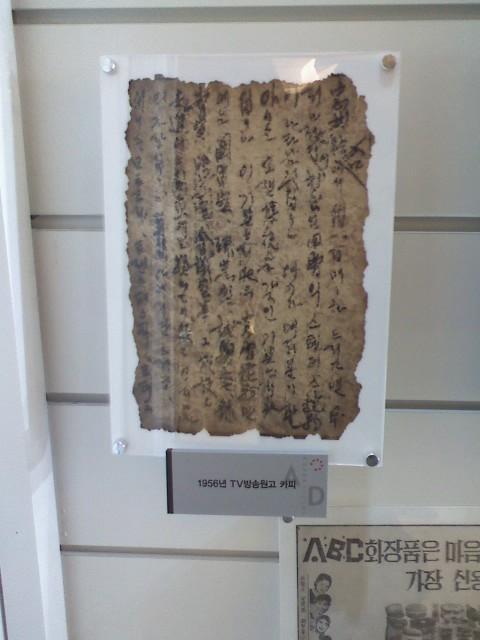
A drama script for the network HLKZ-TV, South Korea's first television station

Television broadcasting began in 1956 with the launch of an experimental station, HLKZ-TV, which was shut down a few years later due to a fire. The first Korean television film was a 15-minute piece titled The Gate of Heaven (천국의 문, Cheongugui mun), on HLKZ-TV. Korea's first drama was Death Row, directed by Choi Chang-bong, Korea's first producer, based on the original play by American playwright Harold Everett Porter.

With the opening of the first national television channel the Korean Broadcasting System (KBS), at the end of December 1961, television dramas began to gain momentum. In the early 60s, single-act dramas such as "Friday Theater" and "Continuous Historical Drama" were aired, and daily soap operas were the main ones entering the late 60s.

The first television series was aired by KBS in 1962. Their commercial competitor, Tongyang Broadcasting (TBC), had a more aggressive program policy and aired controversial dramas as well. The first historical TV series aired was Gukto manri (국토만리), directed by Kim Jae-hyeong (김재형), depicting the Goryeo era. In the 1960s, television sets were of limited availability, thus dramas could not reach a larger audience.

The most popular drama in the 1960s was Sajikgol Old West Room, which aired in 1967, and the first daily soap opera was Snowfall by Dongyang TV in 1968. Meanwhile, The Frog Husband, which aired on MBC in 1969, caused a social stir for the first time in the nation's drama history, based on an affair.

In the 1970s, television sets started to spread among the general population, and dramas switched from portraying dramatic historical figures to introducing national heroes like Yi Sun-sin or Sejong the Great. Contemporary series dealt with personal sufferings, such as Kim Soo-hyun's influential Stepmother (새엄마, Saeeomma), aired by MBC in 1972 and 1973. As technology and funding were limited, Korean channels could not make series in resource-heavy genres like action and science fiction; American and other foreign series were imported instead.

=== 1980s–2000s ===
The 1980s saw a change in Korean television, as color TV became available. Modern dramas tried to evoke nostalgia from urban dwellers by depicting rural life. Kim Soo-hyun's first real commercial success, Love and Ambition (사랑과 야망, Saranggwa yamang), aired on MBC in 1987 and is regarded as a milestone of Korean television, having recorded a 78% viewership. "Streets became quiet at around the airing time of the drama as 'practically everyone in the country' was at home in front of the TV", according to The Korea Times. The most outstanding classical historical series of the era is considered to be 500 Years of Joseon (조선왕조500년, Joseonwangjo 500 nyeon), a serial that ran for eight years, consisting of 11 separate series. The serial was produced by Lee Byung-hoon, who later directed one of the biggest international successes of Korean drama, Dae Jang Geum (2003–04), which was sold in 150 countries.

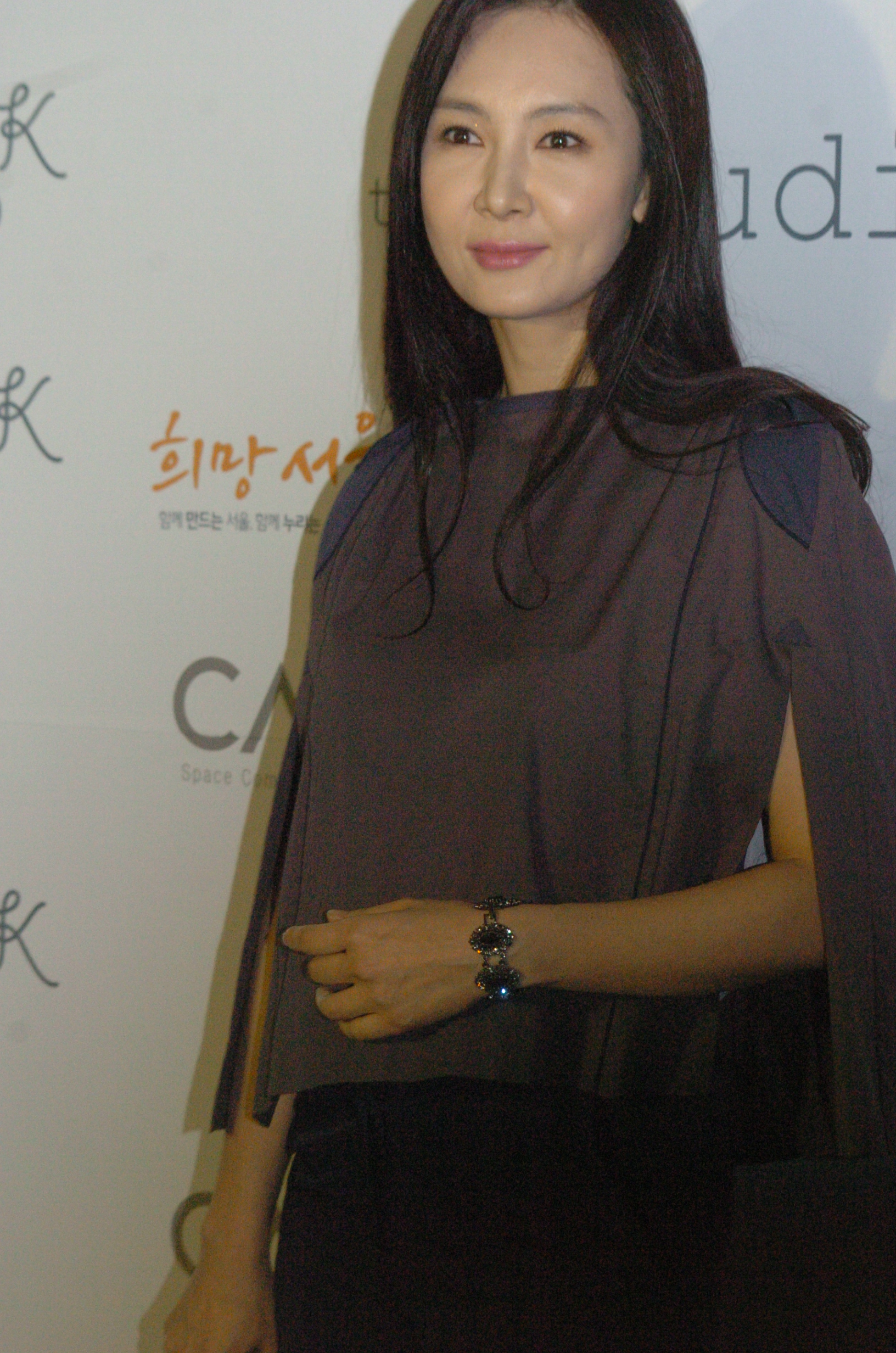
Actress Chae Shi-ra, the lead of Eyes of Dawn (1991)

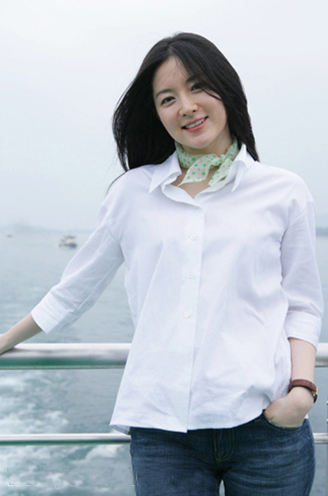
Actress Lee Young-ae, the lead of Jewel in the Palace (2003)

The 1990s brought another important milestone for Korean television. As technology developed, new opportunities arose, and the beginning of the decade marked the launch of a new commercial channel: Seoul Broadcasting System (SBS), which facilitated and re-initiated a race for catching viewers' attention. The first real commercial success among Korean television series was Eyes of Dawn (여명의 눈동자, Yeomyeongui nundongja), aired in 1991 by MBC, starring Chae Shi-ra and Choi Jae-sung. The series led the viewers through turbulent times from the Japanese rule to the Korean War. The 1992 MBC miniseries Jealousy starring Choi Jin-sil and Choi Soo-jong is considered the first "trendy drama", marking a breakthrough in filming techniques and the beginning of the romantic comedy genre in Korean dramas. The series depicted the lifestyles of young people of the era and is one of the first dramas to air in China, along with Eyes of Dawn. New channel SBS also produced successful series, one of them being Sandglass in 1995. Sandglass was another trendy drama, which the Korean Culture and Information Service considers an important milestone, having changed the way Korean dramas are made by introducing a new format. In this decade, the new miniseries format became widespread, with 12 to 24 episodes. The term Hallyu (Korean: 한류) which comes from Mandarin 韓流, (Pinyin: hán liú) was coined in the late 1990s after the success of Star in My Heart in China, and its popularity elevated the main cast to Hallyu stardom. This era marked the start of export for Korean dramas, setting off the Korean Wave.

The beginning years of the 2000s gave birth to famous Korean dramas and also marked the period of overseas distribution. Some popular ones are Full House, Autumn in My Heart and Winter Sonata. It marks the birth of a new genre, called "fusion sageuk", essentially changing the ways to produce historical series, with successful pieces such as Hur Jun, Damo and Dae Jang Geum. It started to take over the popularity of conventional dramas among audiences in their 10s and 20s because of the shorter runtime, and often features trendy content which teenagers find it easy to relate to.

When KBS2's Iris premiered in 2009, it featured action scenes unusual for dramas and settings in Japan and Europe. Directed by Yang Yoon-ho, known for Fighter in the Wind and Holiday, it generated early excitement and displayed a cinematic quality. The show left a notable impact on Korean action drama and achieved viewership ratings over 35%.

=== 2010s–present ===
My Love from the Star, which aired in 2014, redefined the trajectory of the Korean Wave. Unlike the earlier movement that was primarily centered in Japan, this series achieved massive popularity and profitability in China, ushering in the "Korean Wave 3.0" era. Following this success, Pinocchio set a new record for exports to China, selling for approximately $280,000 (roughly 311.27 million won) per episode.

The mid-2010s marked a structural shift in South Korean television as dominance migrated from terrestrial networks to cable and pay-TV channels. the tvN series such as Reply 1997 and Reply 1994 evoked deep nostalgia for the 1990s, securing the highest viewership ratings ever seen for cable dramas at that time. Furthermore, Misaeng resonated with audiences by portraying the realistic joys and sorrows of office life. In 2015, the tvN series Reply 1988, became a cultural touchstone, setting a new record for cable television rating. This cultural phenomenon was credited by the BBC for ushering in South Korea’s "cable era," while The Korea Times hailed it as a "National Drama." This record was subsequently surpassed by the 2018 satire Sky Castle, later by the 2020 drama The World of the Married. As of 2026, the latter remains the highest-rated cable drama in history, boasting a peak nationwide rating of 28.371%. Despite major commercial hits like Reborn Rich (2022), and Queen of Tears (2024), that 2020 benchmark remains the industry standard for domestic cable broadcasts.

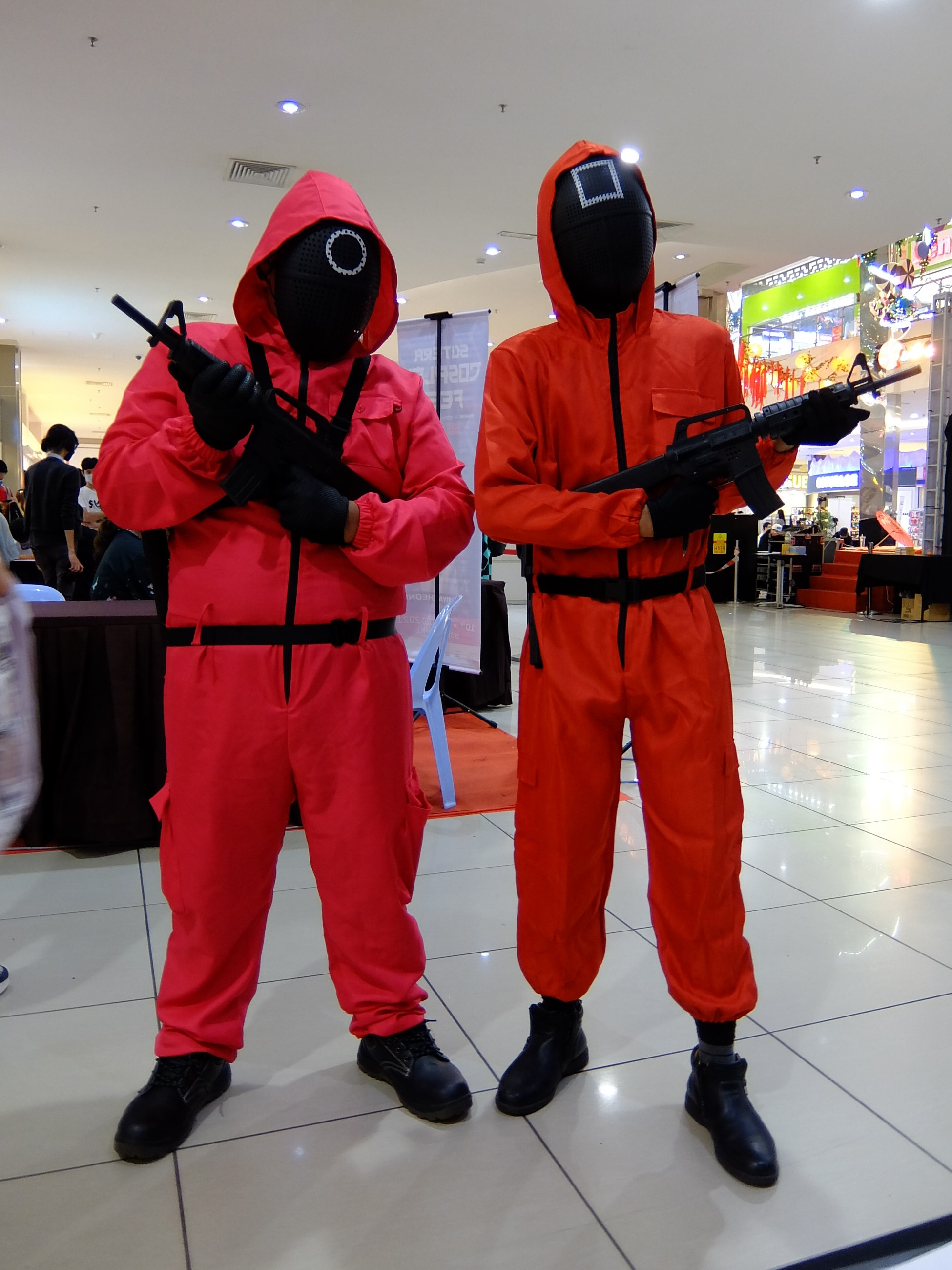
Cosplayers of the Netflix K-drama Squid Game in Malaysia

The late 2010s and 2020s saw newfound attention of K-dramas from international markets. Netflix had begun seeking productions from South Korea and other countries since around 2018 to expand offerings for their service with a growing international audience. These efforts came to fruition when Hwang Dong-hyuk's Squid Game starring Lee Jung-jae, drew in more than 111 million viewers within 17 days of its release in September 2021, becoming the service's most-watched program. For his performance, Lee won he Primetime Emmy Award for Outstanding Lead Actor in a Drama Series in 2022, making him the first person to win that award for a non-English-speaking role, and the first Asian man to win that award.

South Korea's International Emmy presence evolved from early milestones to consistent global recognition. Early milestones included Jang Hyuk's 2011 Best Actor nomination for The Slave Hunters and Splash Splash Love's 2016 nomination for Best TV Movie or Mini-Series. After few years gap, in 2021 It’s Okay to Not Be Okay earned a nomination for Best TV Movie or Mini-Series. In 2022, The King’s Affection made history as the first Korean series to win for Best Telenovela. That same year, Lee Sun-kyun secured a Best Actor nomination for the sci-fi thriller Dr. Brain. Subsequent nominations included Extraordinary Attorney Woo (2023), Reborn Rich (2023), Daily Dose of Sunshine (2024) and Chicken Nugget.

Several production companies began to produce dramas even before the first season like The Penthouse: War in Life (2020–2021) which aired over three seasons. The introduction of the "season system" is interpreted as changes in the industry due to the 52-hour workweek, viewers' rejection of feature-length dramas, and oversupply of dramas.

In the mid-2020s, dramas aired on terrestrial and cable networks have experienced a significant decrease in viewership. This trend was attributed to changes in viewing habits and the rise in popularity of over-the-top media service (OTT) domestically. In 2025, when the Netflix original series When Life Gives You Tangerines starring IU and Park Bo-gum aired, it garnered cross-generational popularity signaling that OTT consumers have now appealed to all age groups including middle-aged and older viewers. Media outlets have dubbed When Live Give You Tangerines a "National Drama", a sobriquet reserved for productions via over-the-air, cable, and satellite television.

== Format ==
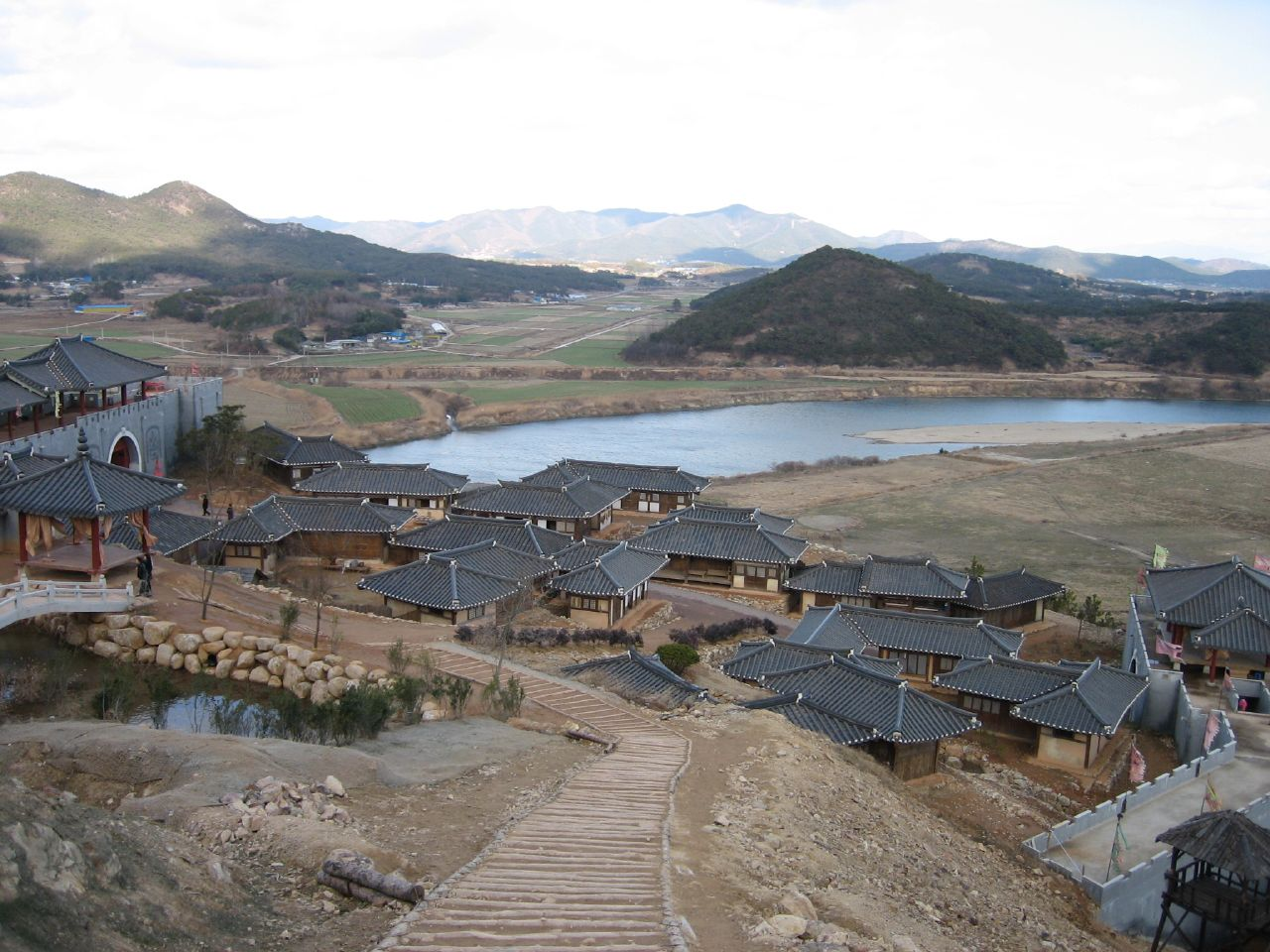
Yongin Daejanggeum Park, a filming site where historical dramas for Munhwa Broadcasting Corporation (MBC) are produced

A single director usually leads Korean dramas, which are often written by a single screenwriter. This often leads to each drama having distinct directing and dialogue styles. This differs from American television series, which can rely on multiple directors and writers working together.

The 19:00 to 21:00 evening time slots have usually been reserved for daily dramas, which run every night from Monday through Friday. Dramas in these slots are in the telenovela format, rarely running over 150 episodes. Unlike American soap operas, these daily dramas are not broadcast during the daytime. Instead, the daytime schedule often includes reruns of the flagship dramas. The nighttime dailies can achieve very high ratings. During the late 2000s, for example, the weekend series First Wives' Club recorded 41.3%, according to TNS Korea, and the evening series Temptation of Wife peaked at 40.6%, according to TNS Korea.

=== Plots and storylines ===
K-dramas have a multitude of different genres such as action dramas, historical dramas, school dramas, medical dramas, legal dramas, and even horror comedies. While most dramas contain romantic elements and deep emotional themes, some may also contain a tragedy or slice of life theme. There are various styles and tones.

The main themes of Korean television dramas are friendship, family values, and love, blending traditional Confucian values with Western materialism and individualism.

However, it is an emerging trend amongst Korean dramas to showcase ongoing societal issues of Korean society, such as stigma of mental illness, gender inequality, suicide, classism, bullying, spy cameras, corruption, homophobia, or racism.

=== Historical ===
The term sageuk refers to any Korean television or film drama that is either based on historical figures, incorporates historical events, or uses a historical backdrop. While sageuk directly translates to "historical drama", the term is typically reserved for dramas taking place throughout the course of Korean history.

Since the mid-2000s, some sageuk dramas have achieved major success outside of Korea, in places such as the Asia-Pacific, Central Asia, Greater Middle East, Central and Eastern Europe and Latin America. Sageuks including Dae Jang Geum (Jewel in the Palace), Yi San (Lee San, Wind of the palace) and Jumong enjoyed strong ratings in countries such as Vietnam, Uzbekistan, Kazakhstan, Fiji and Iran. Jumong, which aired on IRIB (Islamic Republic of Iran Broadcasting) in 2008, had 85% viewership.

=== Romance ===
Often centered on a love story, series set in contemporary times often focus on family ties and romantic relationships. Characters are mostly idealized with Korean male protagonists described as handsome, intelligent, rich, and in search of "one true love". Happy endings are a recurring feature of romantic Korean dramas. This has also been a contributing factor to the popularity of Korean dramas among women.

== Production ==
Korean series were originally produced in-house by the television channels themselves, but have been outsourced to independent companies since the 2000s. In 2012, as much as 75% of all K-dramas were produced this way. Competition is fierce among these companies; out of 156 registered firms, only 34 produced dramas that were actually aired in 2012.

In the late 2010s, a typical Korean drama might cost as much as ₩700 million per episode. Historical dramas have a bigger budget; one episode of the historical romance The Red Sleeve cost as much as ₩950 million. Recently, factors such as improving the work environment, along with whether to sign contracts with domestic and foreign OTT companies such as Netflix, have served as variables. For example, Kingdom had a budget of ₩2 billion per episode.

Often, production companies overrun their budgets and cannot pay salaries. In 2012, actors held a demonstration in front of the headquarters of KBS, expressing their concerns. Actors are usually paid after the last episode is aired. In series made by smaller production companies, there have been cases where the companies went bankrupt and could not pay their actors and crew, while the channel denied all responsibility, claiming all liability was with the bankrupt production firm. Producer Kim Jong-hak spent ₩10 billion on Faith, which was considered a commercial failure, resulting in the inability of Kim to pay crew salaries and other overheads. Kim, who had produced iconic dramas such as Eyes of Dawn and Sandglass, committed suicide after he was accused of embezzlement.

The biggest stars may earn more than ₩200 million per episode, with Kim Soo-hyun, the lead of hit dramas Moon Embracing the Sun (2012), My Love from the Star (2013) and It's Okay to Not Be Okay (2020) reportedly receiving ₩500 million per episode for One Ordinary Day in 2021.

=== Filmmaking process ===
As producing a series involves high expenses, production companies seek to shoot the episodes in the shortest time possible. In contrast to practices elsewhere, the first four episodes of Korean series are usually shot in advance, but the rest are shot continuously as the series is being aired. Scripts are not finished in advance, and may change according to viewer feedback and viewership ratings, with popular characters receiving increased screen time and plotlines changing to match audience expectations. These changes may occur a few hours before daily shooting, and the crew might receive only a few ready pages. The production usually works with three camera crews, who work in a rotating manner to speed up filming. Because of unregulated script changes and tight shooting schedules, actors are almost continuously on standby, and have no time to leave the set or sleep properly. The Korean media have a separate word to describe the irregular naps that actors resort to, in often uncomfortable positions or within the set: jjok-jam (쪽잠), or "side-sleeping". Dramas usually air on two days every week, with following episodes having to be shot during the intervening five days. Some Korean actors have admitted to receiving IV therapy during filming, due to extreme schedules and exhaustion. Nonetheless, the live-shoot model remains widely used since the production team can react to audience feedback in real time.

Production teams originally sent two tapes to the channels, a primary copy and a backup copy. However, due to the tight filming schedules, a 70-minute episode might arrive at the broadcasting station on seven separate tapes in ten-minute installments. Thus, while the episode is being broadcast, the crew would be still shooting the last minutes or cutting the rest of the episode. During the airing of the nineteenth episode of Man from the Equator, screens countrywide went black for 10 minutes. Actor Kwon Sang-woo openly complained that he was still shooting King of Ambition 30 minutes before the last episode began airing. In South Korea, some production teams still do planning and scheduling manually instead of using dedicated software.

In 2016, dramas such as Descendants of the Sun, Uncontrollably Fond, Moon Lovers: Scarlet Heart Ryeo and Hwarang: The Poet Warrior Youth were all pre-produced before airing. Nonetheless, some pre-produced episodes are often re-edited or even reshot the day of airing, due to audience feedback. The larger broadcasting companies have their own dedicated shooting locations for historical dramas, with extensive and elaborate sets. MBC's series are shot at the Yongin Daejanggeum Park in Gyeonggi Province, while KBS dramas utilize the Mungyeongsaejae Studio (문경새재 KBS촬영장) in North Gyeongsang Province and their studio in Suwon.

== Personnel ==
=== Actors and actresses ===
During the early decades of South Korean television, from the 1960s through the early 1990s, the acting profession functioned as a stable corporate career rather than a pursuit of independent stardom. Major broadcasting stations, such as KBS, MBC, and TBC, operated under an exclusive recruitment system known as Gong-chae. Many veteran actors currently working in the industry began their careers through this system, including Lee Byung-hun, who joined the KBS 14th recruitment class in 1991.

Aspiring actors applied directly to a television network and underwent a rigorous, multi-stage audition process. Once hired, they became salaried employees, earning steady compensation comparable to that of network clerks or producers. Salaries were determined by a strict rank system based on an actor's grade or years of service. Legally bound by exclusivity, actors could only appear in programs produced by their employer; for example, an MBC actor was barred from participating in a KBS drama without a rare formal agreement. Furthermore, actors were required to clock in at the studio, attend mandatory training, and perform additional company duties.

In 1981, KBS and MBC announced the abolition of the exclusive contract system for actors and screenwriters to lower costs and reduce competition. This shift aimed to transition the industry toward a merit-based compensation model that considers both experience and popularity rather than mere seniority. While producers and top-tier stars welcomed the increased flexibility to work across networks, newer actors expressed concerns about stability. The industry anticipated a complete reorganization of talent and a redirection of funds toward enhancing production quality.

The Korean drama industry has a long history of employing child actors to portray younger versions of lead characters or the children of adult protagonists. A significant number of these performers have successfully transitioned into adult careers, with notable examples including Yoo Seung-ho and Yeo Jin-goo; and actresses like Park Shin-hye, Moon Geun-young, Park Eun-bin, Lee Se-young, Moon Ga-young, Kim So-hyun, Kim Sae-ron and Kim You-jung.

The Hallyu movement gained momentum in the late 1990s and early 2000s, led by a foundational group of "first-generation" actors who achieved pan-Asian stardom. In the early 2000s, Japanese media dubbed Bae Yong-joon, Jang Dong-gun, Lee Byung-hun, and Won Bin the "Original Four Kings" of Hallyu. Bae became a central figure when his role in Winter Sonata (2002) garnered a massive following in Japan. Several actresses were also instrumental in expanding the hallyu's reach. Choi Ji-woo an early initiator of the Korean Wave, earned the nickname "Ji-woo Hime" (Princess Ji-woo) in Japan following the success of Winter Sonata and Stairway to Heaven. Song Hye-kyo achieved household recognition across Asia with Autumn in My Heart and Full House. Lee Young-ae sparked global interest in Korean traditional culture through the historical epic Jewel in the Palace. Additionally, Jun Ji-hyun became a top Hallyu star in Chinese-language markets after redefining romantic lead archetypes in the film My Sassy Girl.

By the 2000s, it became customary for production companies to cast popular K-pop idols in dramas. Initially, this generated mixed reactions. as the public often perceived idol acting as less professional than that of trained actors. While some idols faced criticism for poor performances, the concept of the "idol actor" has since become a standard feature of the industry. Many performers have successfully bridged the gap between music and acting, with individuals such as Bae Suzy, IU, Yim Si-wan, Park Jin-young, Doh Kyung-soo and Im Yoon-ah, achieving significant critical and commercial success.

=== Scriptwriters ===
Women dominate the drama writing industry; according to the Beijing Metro Reader, they comprise 90% of the profession and penning everything from action to romance. In South Korea, these writers are supported by the Korea Television and Radio Writers Association (KTRWA). This autonomous labor union, located in Seoul, serves roughly 3,700 members working in broadcast and digital media. Beyond community, the KTRWA offers practical protections: writers can register their intellectual property and seek mediation for payment or credit disputes through the organization’s dedicated legal resources.

In South Korea, television scriptwriters often achieve a level of fame comparable to the actors themselves. Prominent scriptwriters typically exert significant influence within the industry. A notable pioneer is Kim Soo-hyun. Kim began her career at MBC after winning a 1968 radio drama competition with her play The Fable of That Year's Winter. Writing under her pen name, she debuted on television in 1972 with the drama Rainbow. Over the following four decades, she became one of Korea's most renowned screenwriters. Her body of work includes some of the most-watched shows in Korean history, such as What is Love (1992), Men of the Bath House (1996), and Trap of Youth (1999). In the book Korea Through TV Drama, author Kim Hwan-pyo notes that the streets would often fall silent during the broadcast of Kim Soo-hyun's Love and Ambition (1987) because "practically everyone in the country" was at home watching.

The next generation of well-known scriptwriters includes the Hong sisters, Kim Soon-ok, Kim Eun-sook, Lee Kyung-hee, Choi Wan-kyu, Noh Hee-kyung, Park Hye-ryun, and Park Ji-eun. Writer Kim Soon-ok is particularly noted for her ability to captivate male viewers, a demographic that traditionally engaged less with television dramas. In 2021, the term "Kim Soon-ok, Kim Eun-sook, and Kim Eun-hee" was used in media reports to highlight the industry's most influential "star writers."

=== Directors ===
Directors of Korean dramas often achieve a level of public recognition comparable to that of the actors. Prominent television directors include Lee Byung-hoon, Kim Jong-hak, Pyo Min-soo, and Jang Tae-yoo. In recent years, director Jo Hyun-tak was also propelled to fame through his works Sky Castle, which became one of the highest rated dramas in Korean cable television history, and Snowdrop, which, despite its alleged historical distortions, was ranked first among the most-watched series on Disney+ in Asian countries like Singapore and South Korea.

While scriptwriters are predominantly women, directors are typically men. In the early 2000s, female directors were notably scarce within drama divisions, particularly when compared to other sectors of broadcasting. In February 2005, Lee Yoon-jung became the first female director at MBC, debuting with the MBC Best Theatre Magic Power Alcohol. At the time of her appointment, women were significantly underrepresented in the field. By the end of 2005, MBC employed only two female directors, while KBS had four and SBS had none. Lee's most famous work is the 2007 series Coffee Prince. Since then, several other female directors have risen to prominence, including Lee Na-jeong, Kim Hee-won, and Jung Ji-in.

== Music ==
Music plays an important role in Korean dramas. Original soundtracks, abbreviated OSTs, are explicitly made for each series, and in contrast to American series, fans have a need to buy the soundtrack album of dramas. This trend started in the 1990s, when producers swapped purely instrumental soundtracks for songs performed by popular K-pop singers. Tom Larsen, director of YA Entertainment, a distributor of Korean TV series, thinks that Korean soundtracks are polished enough musically to be considered standalone hits.

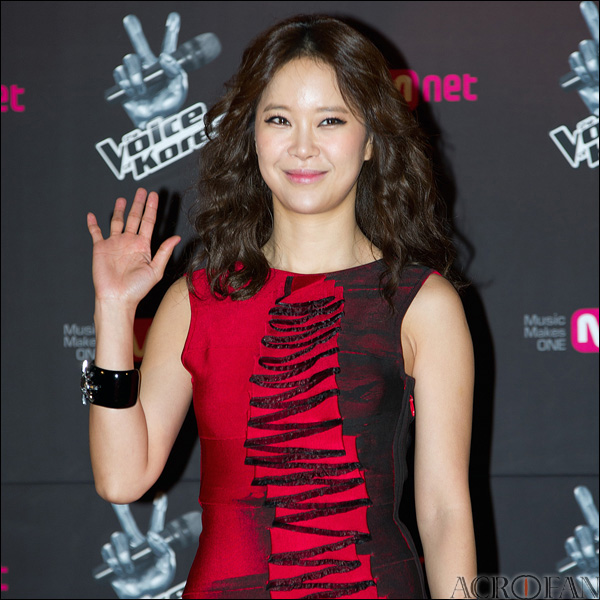
Singer Baek Ji-young has been named "OST Queen" after providing the songs for several hit dramas such as Secret Garden (2010) and Love in the Moonlight (2016).

During the 2000s, it became customary for lead actors to participate in original soundtracks, also partially due to the employment of K-pop stars as actors. Actor Lee Min-ho, and leader of boy band SS501, Kim Hyun-joong both recorded songs for Boys Over Flowers, while the actors of You're Beautiful formed a fictional band and held concerts, where they perform the soundtracks live.

OST songs of popular K-dramas can also become hits on regular music charts, with good sales of both physical and digital albums. The chart performance of the OST songs usually co-relate to the popularity of the drama. Songs from the OST of Secret Garden for example, had high digital sales and high rankings on music charts. My Destiny, performed by Lyn for My Love from the Star, led music charts in Hong Kong, Taiwan, South Korea, and other Asian countries. It also won the Best OST award at the 2014 Baeksang Arts Awards. The soundtrack album of You're Beautiful sold 57,000 physical copies. Performers of OST songs for action series Iris held two concerts in Japan in front of an audience of 60,000 people.

Although the songs in Korean dramas may be a few or repetitive, their choosing process is not considered easy since they are made to convey emotions or scenes. Rocoberry, who composed the soundtrack for Guardian: The Lonely and Great God, created 12 different compositions before I Will Go to You Like the First Snow was chosen, and rewrote it seven times before it got the approval of the production team.

OST composers usually look for singers who have previously had success in the genre. Songs are written to reflect the mood of the series and their structure. Sometimes performers give their own songs for a series. For example, Baek Ji-young thought her song That Man, originally written for her own album, would fit Secret Garden. There are popular OST singers who are often employed, like Baek Ji-young, Lyn, and Lee Seung-cheol. Sometimes, foreign singers are invited to perform songs for Korean OST. For instance, Swedish artist Lasse Lindh sang several songs for series like Angel Eyes, Soul Mate, I Need Romance, and Guardian: The Lonely and Great God.

== Rating system ==
The television rating system is regulated by the Korea Communications Commission, and was implemented in 2000. According to the system, programs, including Korean dramas, are rated according to the following principles (ratings irrelevant to dramas are omitted):

- : programs that may be inappropriate for children under 12, such as mild violence, suggestive themes or language.
- : programs that may be inappropriate for children under 15. Most dramas and talk shows are rated this way. These programs may include moderate or strong adult themes, language, sexual inference, and violence.
- : programs intended for adults only. These programs might include adult themes, sexual situations, frequent use of strong language and disturbing scenes of violence.

== Reception ==
There is a tacit knowledge regarding the production of television series in South Korea that uniquely appeals to consumers. K-dramas have a substantial female presence that makes up their following and representation. The female fandom is specifically targeted, and tacit knowledge is applied most effectively in this area. The Korean actors show a wide range of emotions, and many ad-lib without prompting, even producing genuine tears without assistance.

The acting of women in K-dramas appeals to women universally, showing the struggles that pertain only to women. Women in these television series often assume typically male-dominated professions, and they appeal to all women who want to bring down the image of traditional values and male-dominated communities. K-dramas are successful when women can break free of traditional roles and embrace freedom. The men in K-dramas have begun to present a more fluid nature of representation, which challenges the gender roles typically expected of men. Rather than focusing on being "macho" or "manly," men adopt more feminine and androgynous looks in order to cater to female fans. There is a great focus on the beauty techniques used, ranging from makeup all the way to cosmetic surgeries. The androgyny in K-drama, as well as K-pop, is a common phenomenon and draws the attention of women through global targeting.

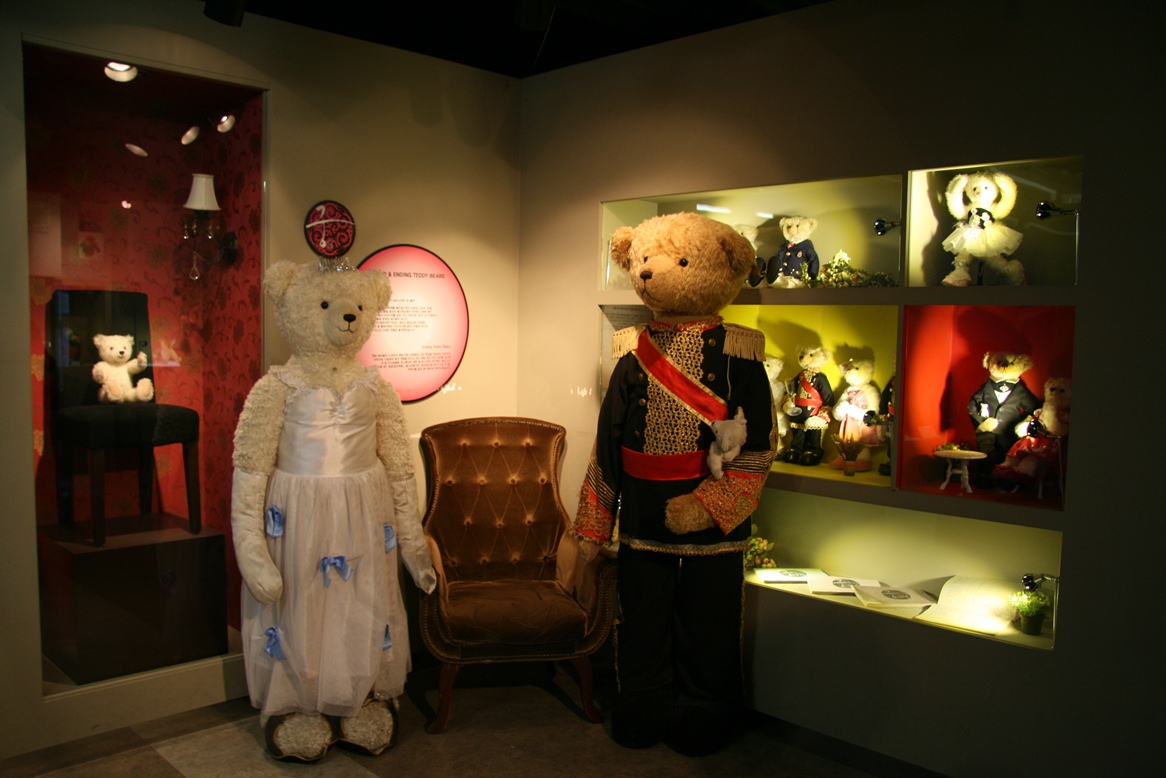
Princess Hours teddy bear exhibition at N Seoul Tower, 2012

According to a researcher at the University of Vienna, the popularity of Korean dramas has its foundation in Confucian values they transmit, which Asian viewers can easily identify with. Respect for elders, filial piety, family-orientedness, and the display of perceived "Asian moral values" play an important role in the Korean series. YA Entertainment, the American distributor of Korean dramas, believes that part of the attractiveness of these series come from the quality of camera work, scenic locations, and spectacular costumes, which make the "final product very stylish and attractive, with arguably some of the highest TV production values in the world." Korean series follow their own formula, are innovative and don't conform to Western television productions. Stephan Lee from Entertainment Weekly called Korean dramas "fascinating and weirdly comforting".

Exports of Korean series yielded US$37.5 million in 2003, which was three times higher than the amount reached in 1999. According to data from Korea Creative Content Agency, in 2013, K-dramas constituted 82% of the culture content export of South Korea, with an income of $167 million, which is four times more than a decade before.

A driving force behind the rising popularity is the intense involvement of fans. Because of the live-shooting production of K-dramas, Korean-speaking fans have the opportunity to participate in their creation—a unique phenomenon in the mass media world. They can influence the content of later shows in the series through complaints and suggestions, which are frequently adopted by the production teams.

The global community of non-Korean-speaking fans, on the other hand, is more involved in the consumption aspects: Fans share their opinions through tweets and comments on newsgroups (for example, the Soompi discussion forum) as well as reviews and recaps on websites and blogs. However, the impact of their social media activity goes beyond the fan community. It spreads the word about the K-drama genre to social connections like acquaintances, friends and family (e.g. Facebook friends or followers on Twitter) and thereby generally raises its popularity. But it also affects the creation of new dramas. It influences the popularity of certain dramas, leading to higher demand for those videos from streaming sites and additional income for broadcasters. When a substantial profit results, it raises not only the prestige of people involved in the production but also provides feedback for production teams and indirectly influences future productions.

=== Asia ===
==== China ====
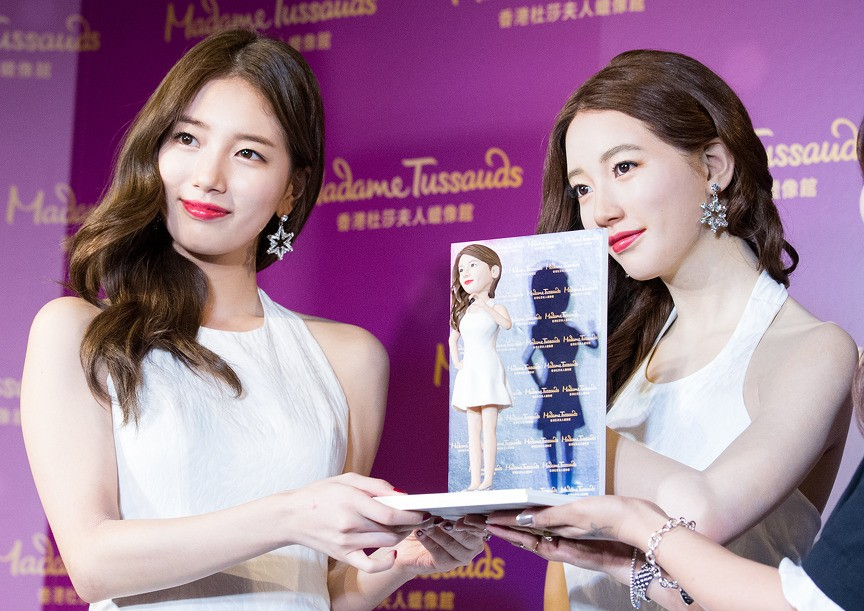
Singer and actress Suzy with her wax figure at Madame Tussauds Hong Kong, September 2016

In China, South Korean programs on Chinese government TV networks accounted for more than all other foreign programs combined in 2006. Hong Kong has its own channel for airing Korean dramas, TVB J2, but ATV also airs Korean series in prime-time slots. My Love from the Star received enthusiastic feedback from China. It was viewed 40 billion times on numerous Chinese video sites. The drama also spurred interest about Korea, shown by China's increased consumption of Korean products such as chi maek (chicken and beer) and Korean cosmetics.

In Taiwan, interest in Korean dramas began when Star in My Heart aired in 1999. Since then, Korean dramas have become very popular, and according to the South Korean mission, 120 K-dramas had been broadcast in Taiwan in the first half of 2011.

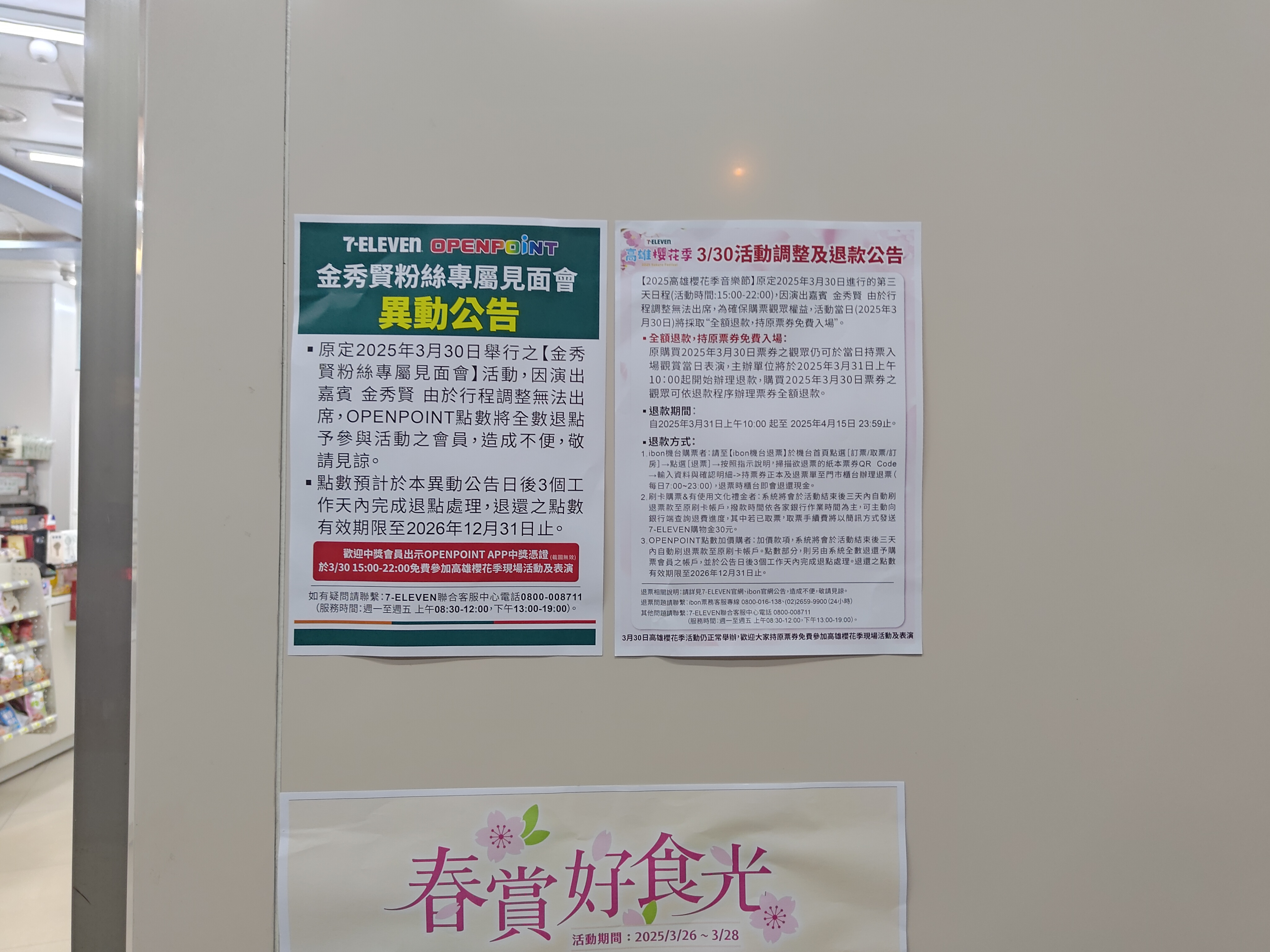
A sign in Mandarin about the fan-meeting cancellation of Kim Soo-hyun from drama My Love from the Star after issues about his private life surfaced

Due to the success of Korean dramas in China, some dramas have been compiled to create feature-length films by combining all episodes into one film. The prodigious popularity of Korean dramas in the country has, on some occasions, been caught in the crossfire over diplomatic issues between China and South Korea. Most notable was the THAAD deployment in South Korea, which resulted in the blocking of Korean dramas on streaming services across the country in late February 2017. Following the block, Chinese TV shows showcasing Chinese culture and other similar content replaced Korean content on TV networks' prime time schedules in the country. In November 2017, the ban was lifted unannounced following the appearance of K-pop groups on national TV and the move to resume importation of Korean dramas by Chinese streaming services. In China, apps like IQiyi, which is currently also available in Malaysia, Singapore, Taiwan and some other countries in multiple different subtitles, are available to stream and download Korean dramas for viewing.

In 2025, star of My Love from the Star and popular K-drama actor Kim Soo-hyun's fan meeting event in Taiwan was cancelled five days before it was originally scheduled to begin due to issues with his private life.

The Chinese Communist Party-owned daily tabloid Global Times has praised the K-drama When Life Gives You Tangerines after its exclusive release on Netflix, which raised the issue of illegal streaming since Netflix is not available in China. Despite this, a supermarket in Hebei, China, used images of the main characters from the drama in advertisements without permission, including scenes of Park Bo-gum as Gwan-sik selling cabbages and IU as Ae-sun holding a cup of pea rice.

==== Japan ====
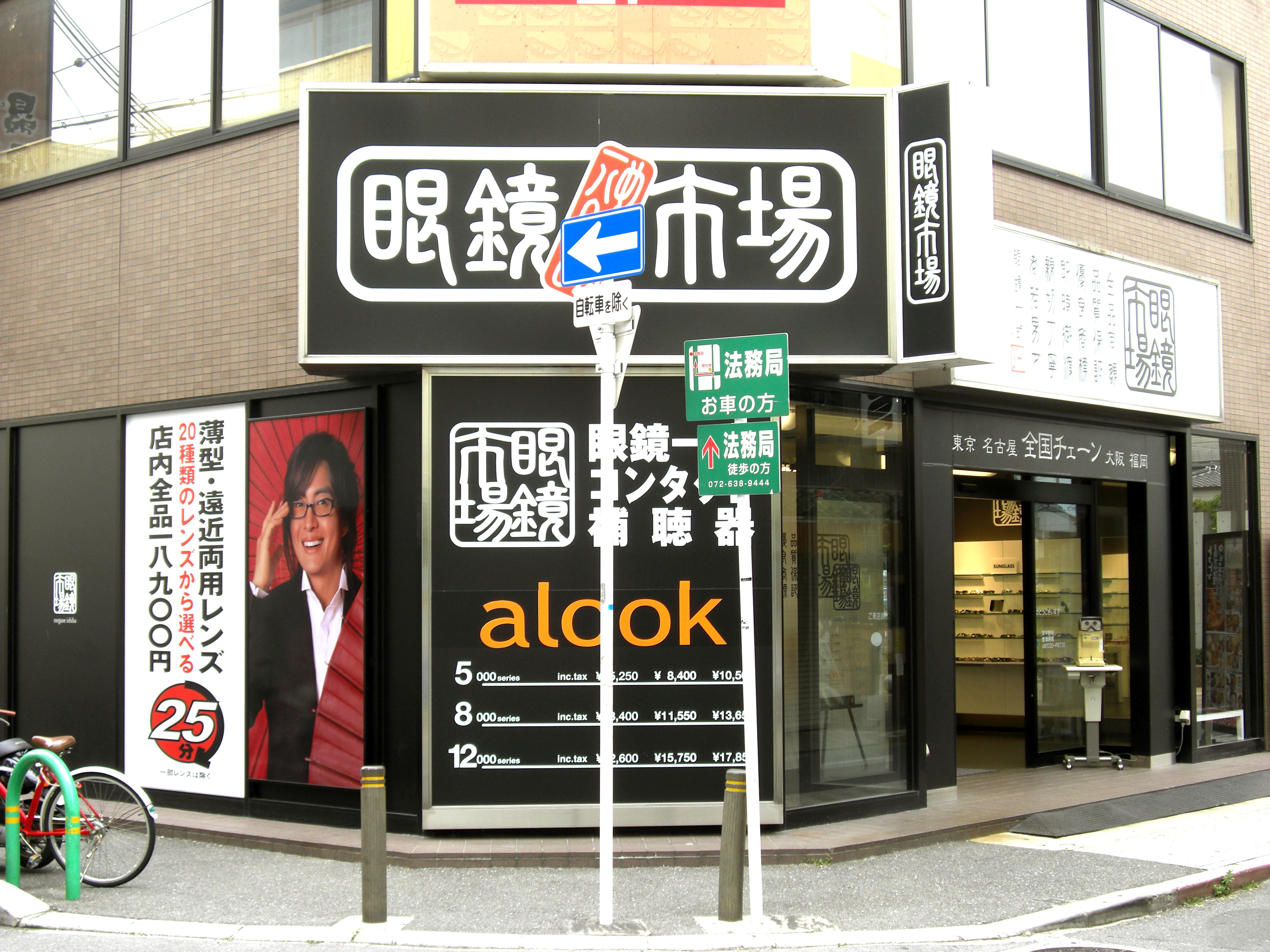
A photo of Winter Sonata star Bae Yong-joon (L) in a storefront in Japan, 2007

The first Korean drama to gain widespread popularity in Japan was Winter Sonata, which was broadcast on the NHK satellite channel NHK BS2 in 2003. The program was aired twice in the same year due to high demand from viewers. Its star, Bae Yong-joon, was immensely popular leading to a "Yonsama Craze" ("sama" is a Japanese suffix used to show respect for royalty, among others, and "Yon" comes from "Yong" in the actor's name). The fan demographic consisted largely of women in their 40s, 50s and 60s but NHK Broadcasting Culture Research Institute stated the drama "was enjoyed by not just a certain group, but by a great portion of the Japanese people, and its popularity expanded to a widespread interest in Korean culture in general". NHK also hosted a classical concert featuring Winter Sonata's tunes performed by Korean musicians.

Korean dramas boost tourism between Korea and Japan, and are considered a possible way of improving strained relationships between the two countries, as series have become increasingly popular with Japanese viewers. Conversely, the series Iris had several pivotal scenes shot in Akita, Japan, which led to an increase of Korean tourists in that part of country. The popularity of Korean dramas in Japan continued with series You're Beautiful (2009) which earned high ratings in the country, with its star Jang Keun-suk featuring on a Japanese stamp.

In 2018, Ilgan Sports reported that the historical drama Love in the Moonlight, which was first aired in South Korea in 2016, was broadcast in Japan on three channels (TVTokyo, KNTV, and Eisei Gekijou) due to its popularity leading to its star Park Bo-gum being the center of the Korean Wave in Japan akin to Bae Yong-joon. Park Bo-gum has since released a Japanese studio album titled "Blue Bird" in 2020 under Pony Canyon, and has held fan meetings and concerts in Japan's major arenas.

==== Mongolia ====
In Mongolia, Korean dramas have become popular and are broadcast during primetime. Dae Jang Geum achieved success in the country and was broadcast five times due to this. Autumn in My Heart, Winter Sonata and Stairway to Heaven were other popular dramas. The popularity of Korean dramas has resulted in interest in learning the Korean language as well as Mongolians travelling to South Korea. It has also led to increased mutually cooperative relations between Mongolia and South Korea.

==== North Korea ====
Watching films or TV dramas from South Korea is a serious offence in North Korea, punishable by execution, but people still manage to acquire them on CDs, VHS Tapes, streaming services and DVDs.

In 2021, there was an article that young people who were watching the popular drama The Penthouse: War in Life were caught in Pyeongseong, Pyeongnam Province, and will have to serve more than 10 years. Later, the residents of Yanggang Province began to imitate the famous lines from Penthouse series, and the residents were also unable to avoid punishment.

==== Brunei ====
In recent times, Korean dramas have experienced growing popularity in Brunei. The growing impact of Korean culture in Brunei led to the hosting of the ninth Korea Forum in the country at Universiti Brunei Darussalam in 2010. Korean television dramas, movies, music, and clothing have had a great impact on the people of Brunei.

==== Cambodia ====
The first Korean drama to be broadcast in Cambodia was Winter Sonata; it was, however, Full House that launched the interest in Korean dramas and entertainment in the country. Following the success of Full House, more Korean dramas have been dubbed into the Khmer language. Korean dramas have become popular, particularly amongst youth in Cambodia.

==== Indonesia ====
In Indonesia, Korean dramas have gained popularity and the popular Korean dramas Winter Sonata and Endless Love were aired on Surya Citra Media in 2002. Some Korean dramas have also been remade into Indonesian versions such as Demi Cinta in 2005 which was a remake of the popular drama Autumn in My Heart and Cinta Sejati, a remake of Stairway to Heaven. RCTI and Indosiar are examples of Indonesian television networks that air Korean dramas in the early times, but later Trans TV airing some of popular Korean dramas until today.

==== Laos ====
The popularity of Korean dramas and pop culture in Laos has led to many Laotian tourists travelling to South Korea. Korean pop culture has gained popularity in Laos through the Thai TV channels broadcasting Korean dramas and K-pop bands in the country.

==== Malaysia ====
In Malaysia, Winter Sonata began airing on TV3 in 2003, which started an interest in Korean pop culture in the country. Dae Jang Geum and Autumn In My Heart were also aired in Malaysia. The popularity of Korean dramas have resulted in a positive reception of Korean expatriates in Malaysia.

==== Myanmar ====
In Myanmar, the K-drama Autumn in My Heart was broadcast in the country in 2001, which led to interest in Korean entertainment. When Dae Jang Geum was aired, the drama sparked an interest in Korean cuisine in the country. The rising popularity of Korean dramas and music in Myanmar has led to the Korea Foundation for International Culture Exchange (KOFICE) distributing Korean dramas in the country for free.

==== Philippines ====
Since the 2000s, Korean television dramas are a regular source of entertainment in the Philippines. Huge demands from Filipino viewers prompted Philippine television stations to import South Korean programs. For more than two decades, GMA Network has the highest number of Korean dramas broadcast in the Philippines. Filipino politician and SAGIP Partylist representative Rodante Marcoleta complimented that Korean dramas have better stories and has a lot of choices: "they may not be so good at acting, but the flow of the story, especially their society is different so it will attract your interest, you get something to learn. They can show their culture, we see it ourselves and we say, we should adopt that too." President Bongbong Marcos acknowledged the importance of Korean dramas and culture to the Filipinos: "with Korean restaurants sprouting out around the Philippines, Filipinos have shared stories and have laughed over some kimchi, some samgyeopsal with friends and family, and of course, the countless hours we have spent binge-watching our favorite Korean dramas and listening to K-pop. This highlights how the Filipinos love Koreans."

==== Singapore ====
In Singapore, Prime 12 (now known as Suria) originally aired the Korean drama Sandglass every week in 1996 and aired Asphalt Man in 1997. Since 2001, Korean dramas have aired on Channel U daily, dubbed into Mandarin Chinese. The launch of KBS World, ONE TV ASIA, Oh!K, Channel M and streaming app, Viu in Singapore allows viewers to watch Korean dramas with a variety of subtitles in a matter of hours after the original South Korean telecast. Currently, Singaporeans also get access to Korean dramas through China-originated online platform IQIYI, which first soft-launched its app in 2019 and planned to expand its international bases in Singapore.

==== Thailand ====
When Dae Jang Geum was aired in Thailand, Korean food started gaining wide popularity. Due to the lop-sided nature of entertainment exports favoring South Korea, the Thai government requested increased introduction of popular Thai films to South Korean media outlets. This led to the signing of an Agreement of Cultural Cooperation between the two countries in August 2004.

==== Vietnam ====
Korean dramas have also gained popularity in Vietnam, particularly among women and young people. The fashion and hairstyles presented in Korean dramas have become very popular among the youth of the country.

==== Bangladesh ====
Korean dramas have gained popularity in Bangladesh in recent years. Their rising popularity in the country has led to the Korea Foundation for International Culture Exchange (KOFICE), an organisation which aims to distribute Korean dramas for free to countries, cooperating with broadcasters to distribute Korean dramas for free in the country. With the growing number of K-drama fans in Bangladesh, more and more Facebook groups are popping up, giving them a platform to share their love of the shows with fellow K-drama enthusiasts and take part in events and activities hosted by the groups. One of the largest Bangladeshi K-Drama groups, BD K-Family, arranges a yearly get-together for its members. Other popular Facebook K-Drama groups include K-Drama Archive BD, Korean Lovers Bangladesh, and BD Korean Drama Fam- all of which create opportunities for both local and international fans to participate in discussions about their favourite shows.

==== Pakistan ====
In Pakistan, Korean dramas have gained popularity after the broadcast of My Love from the Star, Empress Ki and The Heirs have been broadcast in dubbed on H Now entertainment. Whereas Pakistan Television Corporation aired Dae Jang Geum and Descendants of the Sun being aired in Filmazia. However, during the pandemic, Hallyu sparked and took Pakistan by storm when the hit shows Crash Landing on You, All of Us Are Dead, and Squid Game took off. With the help of Korean Dramas and "K-pop" Pakistani youngsters are getting more familiar with them. Korean dramas are mostly watched by women and young Pakistanis. Korean dramas are unique enough to be endearing and familiar enough to be reassuring for Pakistani viewers because of the similar storylines regarding family, romance, and comedic elements. Pak-Korea Culture Collaboration (PKCC) is a group of young Pakistanis living in Karachi who want to improve ties between both cultures. The youth have worked with the Korean embassy in Karachi on multiple occasions to host festivals and activities, and they have been incredibly successful in their aim.

==== Bhutan ====
In the Himalayan kingdom of Bhutan, Korean dramas and entertainment have gained popularity, particularly amongst youth. Before interest in Korean entertainment, Bollywood had largely been the most popular form of entertainment in the country. When the Bhutanese film industry launched in the mid-1990s, Bollywood was the only form of influence on the industry. However, in recent years, Korean entertainment has made significant inroads in the country and influenced the entertainment industry alongside Bollywood. Korean entertainment has managed to influence fashion, and many video shops now sell Korean dramas and movies alongside Bollywood films. The interest in Korean entertainment has also led to controversy with older generations voicing their concern that Korean entertainment will deteriorate Bhutanese culture and traditions.

==== India ====
In India, after the late 1990s and around 2000, Korean dramas gained popularity through piracy, particularly in north-eastern states such as Manipur, Assam, Meghalaya, Sikkim, Arunachal Pradesh, Tripura, Mizoram and Nagaland as well as parts of eastern state like West Bengal and more recently in southern states like Kerala, Telangana, Tamil Nadu. Hindi films and TV serials were banned in Manipur in 2000, as a result local television stations began broadcasting subtitled Korean dramas instead from Arirang TV and KBS World. Many young people in north-eastern, eastern, northern and southern parts of India mimic the hairstyles, clothes of Korean actors while Korean fashion became very popular in the region. As part of cultural exchange, public broadcaster Doordarshan telecast Emperor of the Sea and Dae Jang Geum. Korean dramas are dubbed in Tamil on Puthuyugam TV such as Boys Over Flowers, My Love from Another Star, Playful Kiss and many more. Full House and Hwang Jini started airing on Firangi channel in 2008. Reliance Big TV offered KBS World to its subscribers from 2009 on satellite television. Local fan clubs got help from Consul-General of South Korea while Korean Cultural Centre in India (KCCI) under South Korean embassy started mapping popularity of K-dramas. As per KCCI, the motivation to understand Korean drama properly without subtitles is driving the uptake of Korean language classes among the youth with females outnumbering males. DD Bharati broadcast period drama Hur Jun in 2014 that received highest viewer ratings of 34 million from January to October 2014. Online streaming platform ZEE5 launched Descendants of the Sun to test the Indian market from February 8 to March 1, 2017, and found overwhelming positive response for Korean content with viewership ran close to 56 million. The telecast of Korean drama on Cable TV in 2017 stopped as Korean Broadcasting System Network wanted to raise syndication charges due to accumulation of large viewer-ship base in India that included pockets of Bihar, Kerala and Uttar Pradesh due to short 16 to 20 episodes format that are easier for binge-watching. With increasing interest in Korean content among younger generation from tier-1 cities, Samsung through its My Galaxy mobile application is partnering with Korean Broadcasting System (KBS) in 2019 to bring exclusive content for 20 million Indian users. With COVID-19 pandemic, Dish TV started premium K-dramas dubbed in Hindi and Tamil.

Korean dramas also garner high viewership on Netflix, with the second season of the TV series Kingdom being featured in the Top 10 series row as of March 2020. It's Okay to Not Be Okay was similarly on Netflix's Top 10 list in India for several weeks in August 2020. Netflix is actively increasing its investment in Korean content to capture the Indian market. Over-the-top media service (OTT) MX Player confirmed the rising popularity and demand of Korean dramas, particularly among its audience of millenial women, and is now making deals with the South Korean television and radio network company Seoul Broadcasting System (SBS) to bring more content to India. Korean dramas and films became the most visited category for ShortsTV in India. Media experts have analyzed that the themes typical to Korean media, particularly as highlighted in the 92nd Academy Awards winning film Parasite, are relatable to Indian audiences due to their shared Asian cultural heritage and societal values. As per a report from Parrot Analytics, the K-drama series Crash Landing on You, is 1.2 times more in demand than an average TV series that is 89.8% more than all drama titles shown in India forcing broadcasters to make extra slots as women are at the forefront of consumer demand in Korean content category. The COVID-19 lockdown in India proved to be an inflection point in 2020–2021 when Korean drama moved from a niche sub-culture segment to mainstream due to services like Netflix, Rakuten Viki and YouTube. It penetrated to every age group and social background. The popularity of Korean drama forced many over-the-top media service in India such as MX Player, Viu and ZEE5 to bring the dubbed versions in local language that will help cater to large non English speaking audience.

==== Nepal ====
Interest for Korean dramas in the Nepal began when Winter Sonata aired on Kantipur Television Network in the mid-2000s. This led to the popularity of other K-dramas such as Boys Over Flowers, Autumn In My Heart, You Are Beautiful and Full House to name a few. Popularity of Korean media products has also led to interest of learning the Korean language and has resulted in the emergence of Korean language tutorials that air on ABC Television in the country. Korean dramas have become popular among Nepali youth and markets are often frequented by teenagers looking to buy the latest dramas. The hairstyles and fashion of Korean actors have influenced the fashion sense of Nepali youth. Fascinated by the lifestyle and food of Korea, restaurants serving Korean cuisine have also been established in the country.

==== Sri Lanka ====
In Sri Lanka, the Independent Television Network aired Full House in 2009 and it proved popular. Dae Jang Geum aired on Rupavahini in 2012 and was dubbed in Sinhala under the title Sujatha Diyani (සුජාත දියණී), meaning "The Pure, Valuable Daughter" and received a viewer rate of over 90%. The Independent Television Network, Rupavahini, TV Derana, Sirasa TV, Swarnavahini and TV 1 air Korean dramas dubbed in the Sinhalese language. Streaming service, Iflix also streams many Korean dramas with English and Sinhalese subtitles in the country, some as early as 24 hours after their original Korean broadcast. Additionally, the popularity of Korean pop culture in the country has led to an increasingly warm reception towards Korean people.

=== Middle East and North Africa ===
Since the mid-2000s, Israel, Iran, Morocco and Egypt have become major consumers of Korean culture. Following the success of Korean dramas in the Middle East & North Africa, the Korean Overseas Information Service made Winter Sonata available with Arabic subtitles on several state-run Egyptian television networks. According to Youna Kim (2007), "The broadcast was part of the government's efforts to improve the image of South Korea in the Middle East, where there is little understanding and exposure towards Korean culture" (p. 31). The New York Times reported that the intent behind this was to contribute towards positive relations between Arab & Berber audiences and South Korean soldiers stationed in northern Iraq.

MBC4 (Middle East Broadcasting Channel) played a major role in increasing the Korean wave's popularity in the MENA region (Middle East and North Africa). This broadcasting channel hosted a series of Korean drama, paying for the Arabic subtitles or dubbed. starting 2012 such as Boys Over Flowers (أيام الزهور), You're Beautiful (أنت جميلة), Dream High (حلم الشباب), Coffee Prince (مقهى الأمير). Some Arab countries opposed Korean content (dramas, reality show) out of fear that their youth would abandon Islamic traditions in order to adopt Western modernity. However, this did not stop the Korean industries from exporting more Korean Dramas to the Arab world in the following years such as The Heirs (الورثة). The popularity of Korean dramas in the MENA region-and its continuous growth- originates from the content of these dramas. As the majority of the plots of Korean dramas focus on social issues (love between different social classes or family problems for instance), the Arab audiences fit themselves and could relate to the Korean socio-cultural values as they seem appealing to them. So Korean dramas play the role of an equilibrium point where two, somehow, different cultures could create a new cultural space where these two different cultures could meet.

LBC SAT and Rotana Drama (Rotana Group) played a major role in increasing the Korean wave's popularity in the MENA region (Middle East and North Africa). This broadcasting channel hosted a series of Korean dramas, paying for the Arabic subtitles starting in 2022, such as When I Was the Most Beautiful, Extraordinary You, Find Me in Your Memory, Love in Sadness, The Red Sleeve, and My Secret Terrius. The Arab audiences fit themselves and could relate to the Korean socio-cultural values as they seem appealing to them. So Korean dramas play the role of an equilibrium point where two, somehow, different cultures could create a new cultural space where these two cultures could meet. Fear that the learning rituals embedded in the show would lead Kuwaiti youth to abandon their traditions wholesale in order to adopt Western morality wholesale. However, this did not stop the Korean industries from exporting more Korean dramas to the Arab world in the following years.

==== Iran ====
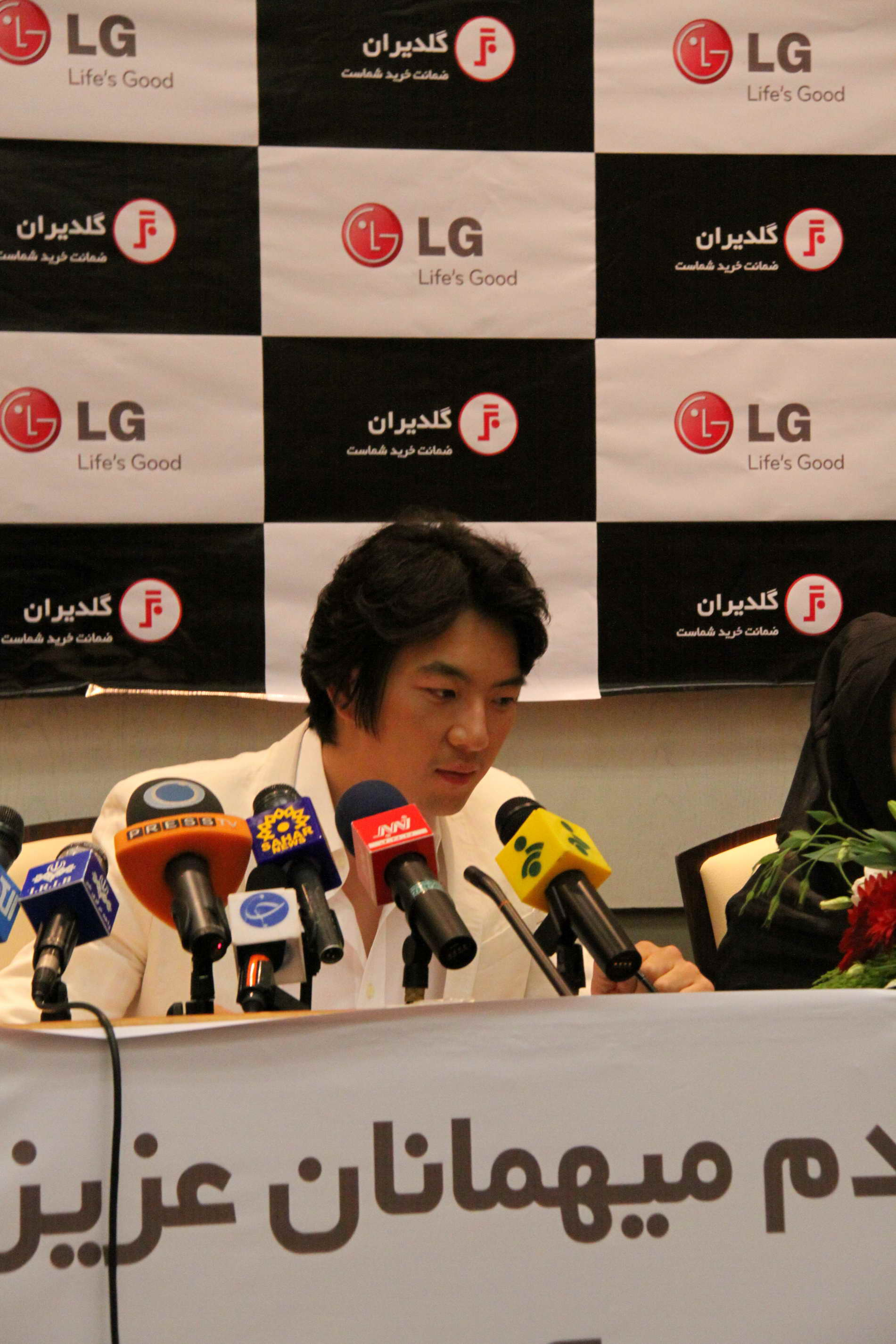
Jumong actor Song Il-gook at a press conference in Iran in 2009

Iran's state broadcaster, Islamic Republic of Iran Broadcasting (IRIB), aired several Korean dramas during prime time slots in recent years, with this decision attributed by some to their Confucian values of respect for others, which are "closely aligned to Islamic culture", while in contrast, Western productions often fail to satisfy the criteria set by Iran's Ministry of Culture and Islamic Guidance. In October 2012, the Tehran Times reported that IRIB representatives visited South Korea to visit filming locations in an effort to strengthen "cultural affinities" between the two countries and to seek avenues for further cooperation between KBS and IRIB. In 2008, the Korean drama Jumong achieved 85% viewership in Iran, According to Reuters, until recently audiences in Iran have had little choice in broadcast material and thus programs that are aired by IRIB often attain higher viewership ratings in Iran than in South Korea; for example, the most popular episodes of Jumong attracted over 90% of Iranian audience (compared to 40% in South Korea).

In the early 2000s, Korean dramas were aired for South Korean troops stationed in northern Iraq as part of coalition forces led by the United States during the Iraq War. With the end of the war and the subsequent withdrawal of South Korean military personnel from the country, efforts were made to expand availability of K-dramas to the ordinary citizens of Iraq. In 2012, the Korean drama Hur Jun reportedly attained a viewership of over 90% in the Kurdistan region of Iraq. Its lead actor Jun Kwang-ryul was invited by the federal government of Iraq to visit the city of Sulaymaniyah in Kurdistan, at the special request of the country's First Lady, Hero Ibrahim Ahmed.

Autumn in My Heart, one of the earliest Korean dramas brought over to the Middle East, was made available for viewing after five months of "persistent negotiations" between the South Korean embassy and an Egyptian state-run broadcasting company. Shortly after the series ended, the embassy reported that it had received over 400 phone calls and love letters from fans from all over the country. According to the secretary of the South Korean embassy in Cairo Lee Ki-seok, Korea's involvement in the Iraq War had significantly undermined its reputation among Egyptians, but the screening of Autumn in My Heart proved "extremely effective" in reversing negative attitudes.

=== Europe ===
==== France ====
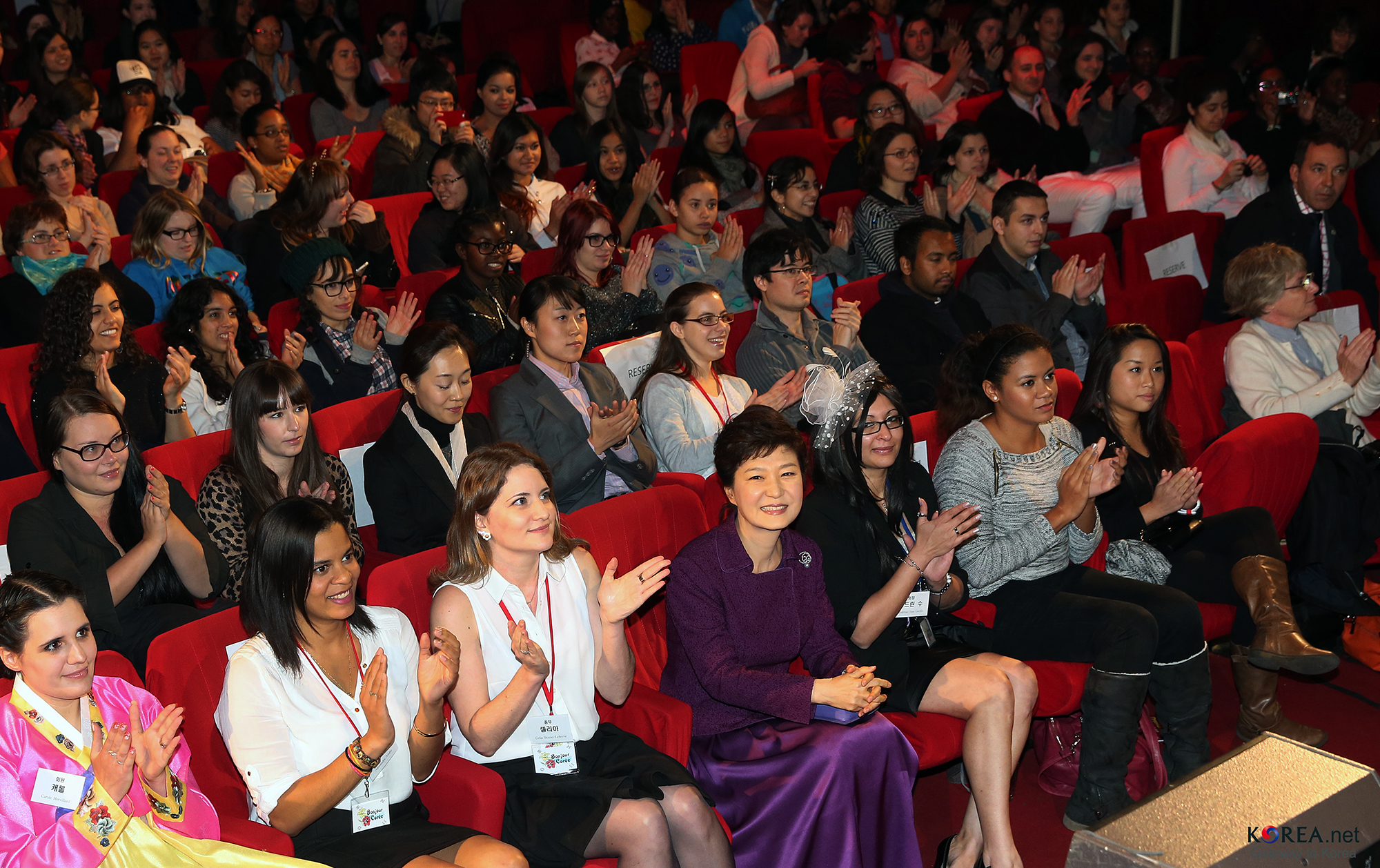
South Korean president Park Geun-hye (center, in purple) at a Korean drama screening organized by French fans

In 2013, Bonjour Coree, a French fan club of Korean dramas arranged an event at the Espace Pierre Cardin performance hall near the famous Champs-Élysées street called the "Drama Party". Organized fully voluntarily, the even was attended by then president Park Geun-hye. "Culture can be the first step to understanding each other, and it has an amazing power to help the people of two countries come together, I hope South Korea and France will become even closer through culture" stated Park in the screening.

==== Romania ====
The first Korean drama in Romania was aired on TVR in August 2009 with Dae Jang Geum, and in the following month it became the third most popular television program in the country. Since then, Korean dramas have seen high ratings and further success.

==== Turkey ====
The first Korean drama broadcast on television in Turkey began airing on TRT 1 in late 2005. The first series was The Merchant (Tacir). It came to Meltem TV in mid-2009 and the first series was Dae Jang Geum (Saraydaki Mücevher). It began airing on Mesaj TV at the same time. However, as a result of the closure of Mesaj TV on 1 December 2021, they switched to Meltem TV to watch Korean dramas. Until 2013, Korean series had achieved ratings.

In April 2020, the Korean series The King's Daughter, Soo Baek-hyang (Kralın Kızı), which was broadcast on TRT 1 during the daytime, was removed from the air. In 2021, Korean dramas were broadcast on TRT 1 at midnight. In January 2022, the last known TRT foreign series, Queen Seondeok (Muhteşem Kraliçe) Korean series, was removed from the air on TRT 1. It was bid farewell 50 years after the broadcast of TRT's first foreign series in 1972. The last Turkish TV channel to broadcast Korean dramas, Meltem TV, was finally removed from the air in 2024.

=== North America ===
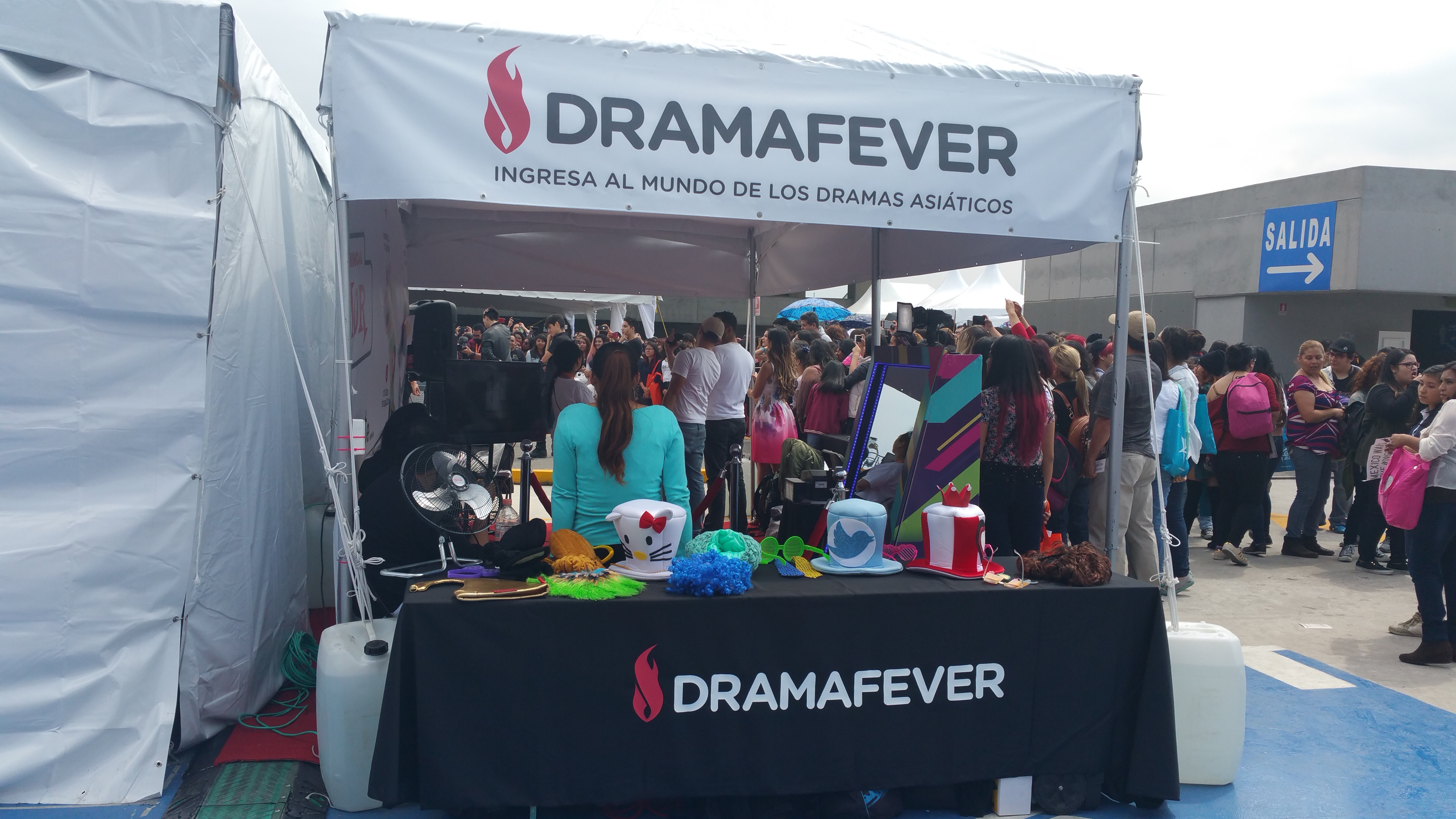
A booth of American video streaming website DramaFever at a Korean fan convention in Mexico. The website offered on-demand streaming video of K-dramas, among others, from 2009 to 2018.

The Asian American-targeted cable TV channels AZN Television and ImaginAsian aired Korean dramas alongside content from China, Japan, India, Thailand and other parts of Asia. The dramas were aimed at the Asian American community before the channels dissolved in 2008 and 2011 respectively. In November 2008, Netflix began offering several Korean dramas as part of its video selection. In August 2009, DramaFever began offering free subtitled video streaming service, with video advertisements, in the United States.

Singapore-based Viki streams popular Korean dramas across the world including North America, with subtitles in 70 languages. Companies in Asia have also designed streaming services available online and as mobile apps targeted towards overseas Asian communities. MobiTV created by the Sri Lankan company, Bhasha is a streaming service and mobile app aimed at the Sri Lankan community and streams Korean dramas dubbed in the Sinhalese language alongside other content aired in Sri Lanka. Roopa, created by the same company, is another service available as a mobile app also aimed at the Sri Lankan community, it too streams Korean dramas dubbed in the Sinhalese language. Chinese company PPTV is another example, a mobile app, PPTV网络电视HD streams Korean dramas aimed at the Chinese community alongside content that is primarily available in Mandarin, Cantonese and Korean but also increasingly in English. Additionally, Korean dramas are available at online DVD retailers. Some Korean dramas, however, are not available for region 1 (North America) encoding and NTSC video format. Amazon offers streaming of Winter Sonata for a fee.

KBFD-DT in Honolulu, Hawaii broadcasts a majority of Korean dramas on its daily schedule, as well as offering the programs on sale at its website and on demand through its K-Life channel on Oceanic Time Warner Cable. Another Honolulu outlet, KHII-TV devotes three hours of its Sunday afternoon schedule to Korean dramas. KTSF, a channel aimed at the Asian American community in San Francisco, California airs Korean dramas as part of its schedule alongside content in Mandarin, Tagalog, Hindi, Korean, Vietnamese, Japanese, Taiwanese and Cantonese.

=== South America ===
Between 2001 and 2002, South America began to absorb Korean programming. The 1997 series Star in My Heart began its successful broadcast in Chile, Peru and other countries in the area, but these last two were where More had repercussions, including an Ahn Jae-wook fan club founded. In 2002, Winter Sonata, produced by KBS 2TV, became the first series in the region to match the success of Meteor Garden, attracting a cult following in Asia. Marketing sales, including DVD sets and novels, exceeded $3.5 million in Japan. In 2004, then-Japanese Prime Minister Junichiro Koizumi noted that the series' male lead was "more popular than I am in Japan." Other Korean dramas released in later years such as Jewel in the Palace (2003) and Full House (2004) had comparable levels of success.

In Chile, which was one of the first countries on a global level, the phenomenon of Korean wave, which is also known as hallyu, began with the first drama aired that was the original 1997 MBC series Star in My Heart in 2001 by Chilevisión past midnight and later years later in 2003 it was retransmitted by Canal 21 (Chillán) in Chillán, but it was not until 2006, when Stairway to Heaven was broadcast at 1:00 pm on the public television channel Televisión Nacional de Chile, which achieved notoriety of this genre being compared to La madrastra—an old very successful Chilean soap opera—due to the high audience figures in its schedule competing directly with other channels, it was also broadcast by TV Chile to other continents dubbed into Spanish.

== Ratings and viewership ==
As of January 1, 2024, Viewership ratings are solely provided by Nielsen Korea. Originally, Nielsen Korea's predecessor, Media Service Korea (MSK), was the sole company providing TV viewership ratings using people meter since 1992, but was only limited to Seoul Capital Area. In 1998, TNS Media Korea began as a rival company in partnership with Taylor Nelson Sofres (TNS) which extended the service to five major cities; it was officially launched in June 1999 with a more sophisticated viewership rating survey technique. While, in August 1999, AC Nielsen acquired MSK and rebranded it as AC Nielsen Korea and expanded the audience rating survey to the whole country with the aim to increase the credibility of the ratings. In 2005, AC Nielsen Korea signed a merger with AGB Group and AGB Nielsen Media Research was established. AGB Nielsen Media Research merged with KADD Nielsen Media Research in January 2013, and the official name was changed to Nielsen Korea.

In 2010, TNS Media Korea was renamed to TNmS (Total National Multimedia Statistics). Since late 2018, TNmS stopped providing data to the public through their websites, and instead occasionally releases the ratings through news agencies such as BreakNews. TNmS eventually stopped its operations on January 1, 2024.

=== List of highest-rated series on terrestrial television ===
The list was compiled from data by Nielsen Korea, based on the episode of the highest viewership since 1992.

==== By household rating ====
- Top 50 series per nationwide household rating
  #	Series	Network	Nationwide household rating (Nielsen)	Final episode date	Ref
  1	You and I	MBC TV	66.9%	April 26, 1998	
  2	First Love	KBS2	65.8%	April 20, 1997	
  3	What Is Love	MBC TV	64.9%	May 31, 1992	
  4	Sandglass	SBS TV	64.5%	February 16, 1995	
  5	Hur Jun	MBC TV	63.5%	June 27, 2000	
  6	A Sunny Place of the Young	KBS2	62.7%	November 12, 1995	
  7	Sons and Daughters	MBC TV	61.1%	May 9, 1993	
  8	Taejo Wang Geon	KBS1	60.2%	February 24, 2002	
  9	Eyes of Dawn	MBC TV	58.4%	February 6, 1992	
  10	Dae Jang Geum	MBC TV	57.8%	March 23, 2004	
  11	See and See Again	MBC TV	57.3%	April 2, 1999	
  12	Truth	MBC TV	56.5%	February 24, 2000	
  13	Lovers in Paris	SBS TV	56.3%	August 15, 2004	
  14	Jealousy	MBC TV	56.1%	July 21, 1992	
  15	Blowing of the Wind	KBS2	55.8%	March 29, 1996	
  16	Men of the Bath House	KBS2	53.4%	September 1, 1996	
  17	Gook Hee	MBC TV	53.1%	November 16, 1999	
  17	Trap of Youth	SBS TV	53.1%	April 15, 1999	
  19	Tomato	SBS TV	52.7%	June 10, 1999	
  20	M	MBC TV	52.2%	August 30, 1994	
  21	Season of the Storm	MBC TV	52.1%	December 30, 1993	
  22	Rustic Period	SBS TV	51.8%	September 30, 2003	
  23	My Mother's Sea	MBC TV	51.6%	December 26, 1993	
  24	Legend of Ambition	KBS2	50.2%	October 25, 1998	
  25	Ladies of the Palace	SBS TV	49.9%	July 22, 2002	
  26	My Son's Woman	MBC TV	49.7%	April 13, 1995	
  26	Jumong	MBC TV	49.7%	March 6, 2007	
  28	Tears of the Dragon	KBS1	49.6%	May 31, 1998	
  29	My Only One	KBS2	49.4%	March 17, 2019	
  30	Star in My Heart	MBC TV	49.3%	April 29, 1997	
  30	Bread, Love and Dreams	KBS2	49.3%	September 16, 2010	
  32	My Lovely Sam Soon	MBC TV	49.1%	July 21, 2005	
  33	Ambition	MBC TV	49.0%	October 13, 1994	
  34	The Moon of Seoul	MBC TV	48.7%	October 16, 1994	
  35	The Last Match	MBC TV	48.6%	February 22, 1994	
  36	All About Eve	MBC TV	48.3%	July 6, 2000	
  36	Wang's Family	KBS2	48.3%	February 9, 2014	
  38	How is Your Husband?	SBS TV	48.2%	October 19, 1993	(Note: As of 2010 it remained 38th in ranking, as of January 2013, it remained 41st in ranking, as of May 2015, it remained around 40th in ranking, as of June 2018, it remained 39th in ranking.)
  39	Cinderella	MBC TV	48.0%	July 13, 1997	
  40	All In	SBS TV	47.7%	April 3, 2003	
  41	Seoyoung, My Daughter	KBS2	47.6%	March 3, 2013	
  42	Until We Can Love	KBS2	47.1%	February 28, 1997	
  43	My Rosy Life	KBS2	47.0%	November 10, 2005	
  44	Pilot	MBC TV	46.2%	November 2, 1993	
  45	Autumn in My Heart	KBS2	46.1%	November 7, 2000	
  46	Daughters of a Rich Family	KBS2	45.9%	April 30, 1995	
  47	My Husband Got a Family	KBS2	45.3%	September 9, 2012	
  48	Brilliant Legacy	SBS TV	45.2%	July 26, 2009	
  49	My Golden Life	KBS2	45.1%	March 11, 2018	
  50	Dear Heaven	SBS TV	44.9%	July 2, 2006	
- ==== By viewers ====
  Top 50 series per nationwide viewers (million) since 2018 (Note: The number of viewers was released by Nielsen Korea starting January 2018.)
  #	Series	Network	Nationwide viewers number in million (Nielsen)	Final episode date	Ref
  1	My Only One	KBS2	9.246	March 17, 2019	
  2	My Golden Life	KBS2	8.366	March 11, 2018	
  3	Young Lady and Gentleman	KBS2	6.956	March 27, 2022	
  4	Once Again	KBS2	6.893	September 13, 2020	
  5	Marry Me Now	KBS2	6.669	September 9, 2018	
  6	Mother of Mine	KBS2	6.247	September 22, 2019	
  7	Homemade Love Story	KBS2	6.145	March 7, 2021	
  8	Revolutionary Sisters	KBS2	5.823	September 18, 2021	
  9	Beautiful Love, Wonderful Life	KBS2	5.693	March 22, 2020	
  10	The Penthouse: War in Life 2	SBS TV	5.601	April 2, 2021	
  11	The Penthouse: War in Life	SBS TV	5.354	January 5, 2021	
  12	It's Beautiful Now	KBS2	5.300	September 18, 2022	
  13	Dr. Romantic 2	SBS TV	5.210	February 25, 2020	
  14	Three Bold Siblings	KBS2	5.144	March 19, 2023	
  15	Agent Kim Reactivated	SBS TV	4.686	July 25, 2026	
  16	When the Camellia Blooms	KBS2	4.491	November 21, 2019	
  17	The Real Has Come!	KBS2	4.330	September 10, 2023	
  18	The Fiery Priest	SBS TV	4.325	April 20, 2019	
  19	Money Flower	MBC TV	4.085	February 3, 2018	
  20	For Eagle Brothers	KBS2	4.011	August 3, 2025	
  21	Taxi Driver 2	SBS TV	4.005	April 15, 2023	
  22	Doctor X: Mafia in White	SBS TV	3.964	November 14, 2026	
  23	Unasked Family	KBS1	3.950	April 17, 2020	
  24	Hot Stove League	SBS TV	3.921	February 14, 2020	
  25	Home for Summer	KBS1	3.897	October 25, 2019	
  26	Live Your Own Life	KBS2	3.884	March 17, 2024	
  27	Brilliant Heritage	KBS1	3.852	October 9, 2020	
  28	The Penthouse: War in Life 3	SBS TV	3.778	September 10, 2021	
  29	Beauty and Mr. Romantic	KBS2	3.771	September 22, 2024	
  30	Iron Family	KBS2	3.709	January 26, 2025	
  31	Liver or Die	KBS2	3.692	March 14, 2019	
  32	Our Golden Days	KBS2	3.677	January 25, 2026	
  33	The Red Sleeve	MBC TV	3.668	January 1, 2022	
  34	No Matter What	KBS1	3.599	March 26, 2021	
  35	Man in a Veil	KBS2	3.502	February 10, 2021	
  36	The Secret of My Love	KBS2	3.480	February 9, 2018	
  37	Sunny Again Tomorrow	KBS1	3.478	November 2, 2018	
  38	Good Partner	SBS TV	3.473	September 20, 2024	
  38	Recipe for Love	KBS2	3.473	July 19, 2026	
  40	It's My Life	KBS1	3.459	April 26, 2019	
  41	Dr. Romantic 3	SBS TV	3.423	June 17, 2023	
  42	Knight Flower	MBC TV	3.395	February 17, 2024	
  43	Bravo, My Life	KBS1	3.382	September 30, 2022	
  44	The Love in Your Eyes	KBS1	3.377	March 24, 2023	
  45	Love Returns	KBS1	3.330	May 4, 2018	
  46	The Last Empress	SBS TV	3.282	February 21, 2019	
  47	The All-Round Wife	KBS1	3.245	April 8, 2022	
  48	One the Woman	SBS TV	3.235	November 6, 2021	
  49	Taxi Driver	SBS TV	3.117	May 29, 2021	
  50	A Pledge to God	MBC TV	3.112	February 16, 2019	

=== List of highest-rated series on cable television ===
- The following dramas air on a cable channel/pay TV which normally has a relatively smaller audience compared to free-to-air TV/public broadcasters (KBS, SBS, MBC and EBS).

==== By household rating ====
- Top 50 series per nationwide household rating
  #	Series	Network	Nationwide household rating (Nielsen)	Final episode date	Ref
  1	The World of the Married	JTBC	28.371%	May 16, 2020	
  2	Reborn Rich	JTBC	26.948%	December 25, 2022	
  3	Queen of Tears	tvN	24.850%	April 28, 2024	
  4	Sky Castle	JTBC	23.779%	February 1, 2019	
  5	Crash Landing on You	tvN	21.683%	February 16, 2020	
  6	Reply 1988	tvN	18.803%	January 16, 2016	
  7	Guardian: The Lonely and Great God	tvN	18.680%	January 21, 2017	
  8	Doctor Cha	JTBC	18.546%	June 4, 2023	
  9	Mr. Sunshine	tvN	18.129%	September 30, 2018	
  10	Extraordinary Attorney Woo	ENA	17.534%	August 18, 2022	
  11	Mr. Queen	tvN	17.371%	February 14, 2021	
  12	Bon Appétit, Your Majesty	tvN	17.107%	September 28, 2025	
  13	Crash Course in Romance	tvN	17.038%	March 5, 2023	
  14	Under the Queen's Umbrella	tvN	16.852%	December 4, 2022	
  15	Love (ft. Marriage and Divorce) 2	TV Chosun	16.582%	August 8, 2021	
  16	Itaewon Class	JTBC	16.548%	March 21, 2020	
  17	Jeongnyeon: The Star Is Born	tvN	16.458%	November 17, 2024	
  18	Agency	JTBC	16.044%	February 26, 2023	
  19	Vincenzo	tvN	14.636%	May 2, 2021	
  20	Our Blues	tvN	14.597%	June 12, 2022	
  21	100 Days My Prince	tvN	14.412%	October 30, 2018	
  22	Hospital Playlist	tvN	14.142%	May 28, 2020	
  23	Hospital Playlist 2	tvN	14.080%	September 16, 2021	
  24	King the Land	JTBC	13.789%	August 6, 2023	
  25	The Tale of Lady Ok	JTBC	13.575%	January 26, 2025	
  26	Reborn Rookie	JTBC	13.568%	July 5, 2026	
  27	Undercover Miss Hong	tvN	13.121%	March 8, 2026	
  28	Hometown Cha-Cha-Cha	tvN	12.665%	October 17, 2021	
  29	Signal	tvN	12.544%	March 12, 2016	
  30	Welcome to Samdal-ri	JTBC	12.399%	January 21, 2024	
  31	The Lady in Dignity	JTBC	12.065%	August 19, 2017	
  32	The Good Bad Mother	JTBC	12.032%	June 8, 2023	
  33	Hotel del Luna	tvN	12.001%	September 1, 2019	
  34	Marry My Husband	tvN	11.951%	February 20, 2024	
  35	Miss Night and Day	JTBC	11.744%	August 4, 2024	
  36	Red Balloon	TV Chosun	11.566%	February 26, 2023	
  37	Twenty-Five Twenty-One	tvN	11.513%	April 3, 2022	
  38	Reply 1994	tvN	11.509%	December 28, 2013	
  39	Prison Playbook	tvN	11.195%	January 18, 2018	
  40	Little Women	tvN	11.105%	October 9, 2022	
  41	The Uncanny Counter	OCN	10.999%	January 24, 2021	
  42	The Crowned Clown	tvN	10.851%	March 4, 2019	
  43	My Kids Give Me a Headache	JTBC	10.715%	March 17, 2013	
  44	Jirisan	tvN	10.663%	December 12, 2021	
  45	Mine	tvN	10.512%	June 27, 2021	
  46	Strong Girl Nam-soon	JTBC	10.420%	November 26, 2023	
  47	Love (ft. Marriage and Divorce) 3	TV Chosun	10.395%	May 1, 2022	
  48	Typhoon Family	tvN	10.342%	November 30, 2025	
  49	Show Window: The Queen's House	Channel A	10.335%	January 18, 2022	
  50	Encounter	tvN	10.329%	January 24, 2019	

==== By viewers ====
Top 50 series per nationwide viewers (million) since 2018
#	Series	Network	Nationwide viewers number in million (Nielsen)	Final episode date	Ref
1	Sky Castle	JTBC	6.508	February 1, 2019	
2	Queen of Tears	tvN	6.399	April 28, 2024	
3	Crash Landing on You	tvN	6.337	February 16, 2020	
4	Reborn Rich	JTBC	6.277	December 25, 2022	
5	The World of the Married	JTBC	6.248	May 16, 2020	
6	Mr. Queen	tvN	4.749	February 14, 2021	
7	Mr. Sunshine	tvN	4.631	September 30, 2018	
8	Extraordinary Attorney Woo	ENA	4.449	August 18, 2022	
9	Itaewon Class	JTBC	4.425	March 21, 2020	
10	Crash Course in Romance	tvN	4.329	March 5, 2023	
11	Bon Appétit, Your Majesty	tvN	4.213	September 28, 2025	
12	Doctor Cha	JTBC	4.088	June 4, 2023	
13	Under the Queen's Umbrella	tvN	4.049	December 4, 2022	
14	Hospital Playlist 2	tvN	3.853	September 16, 2021	
15	Vincenzo	tvN	3.841	May 2, 2021	
16	Jeongnyeon: The Star Is Born	tvN	3.840	November 17, 2024	
17	Agency	JTBC	3.685	February 26, 2023	
18	Hotel del Luna	tvN	3.674	September 1, 2019	
19	Hospital Playlist	tvN	3.579	May 28, 2020	
20	Our Blues	tvN	3.419	June 12, 2022	
21	King the Land	JTBC	3.404	August 6, 2023	
22	Reborn Rookie	JTBC	3.344	July 5, 2026	
23	Love (ft. Marriage and Divorce) 2	TV Chosun	3.344	August 8, 2021	
24	The Tale of Lady Ok	JTBC	3.292	January 26, 2025	
25	100 Days My Prince	tvN	3.264	October 30, 2018	
26	The Uncanny Counter	OCN	3.257	January 24, 2021	
27	Hometown Cha-Cha-Cha	tvN	3.237	October 17, 2021	
28	Undercover Miss Hong	tvN	3.131	March 8, 2026	
29	Prison Playbook	tvN	3.063	January 18, 2018	
30	Twenty-Five Twenty-One	tvN	3.047	April 3, 2022	
31	Welcome to Samdal-ri	JTBC	2.965	January 21, 2024	
32	Marry My Husband	tvN	2.938	February 20, 2024	
33	Memories of the Alhambra	tvN	2.853	January 20, 2019	
34	Miss Night and Day	JTBC	2.815	August 4, 2024	
35	The Good Bad Mother	JTBC	2.669	June 8, 2023	
36	Strong Girl Nam-soon	JTBC	2.652	November 26, 2023	
37	Little Women	tvN	2.618	October 9, 2022	
38	Jirisan	tvN	2.586	December 12, 2021	
39	Typhoon Family	tvN	2.512	November 30, 2025	
40	The Art of Negotiation	JTBC	2.487	April 13, 2025	
41	Encounter	tvN	2.473	January 24, 2019	
42	Red Balloon	TV Chosun	2.457	February 26, 2023	
43	The Crowned Clown	tvN	2.447	March 4, 2019	
44	Mine	tvN	2.429	June 27, 2021	
45	Pro Bono	tvN	2.416	January 11, 2026	
46	Alchemy of Souls	tvN	2.410	August 28, 2022	
47	What's Wrong with Secretary Kim	tvN	2.383	July 26, 2018	
48	Behind Your Touch	JTBC	2.328	October 1, 2023	
49	Military Prosecutor Doberman	tvN	2.279	April 26, 2022	
50	Alchemy of Souls: Light and Shadow	tvN	2.267	January 8, 2023	

== See also ==
- List of South Korean television series
- History of Korean animation
- Korean Wave
- Manhwa
- Mass media in South Korea
- International mass media of South Korea
- South Korean culture
- South Korean television dramas in the Philippines
- Television in South Korea
- Webtoon
- Taiwanese television drama
- Philippine television drama
- Japanese television drama
- Chinese television drama

== Bibliography ==
- Chosun Ilbo (January 8, 2007). "Korean Vs. U.S. Soaps". The Chosun Ilbo. Archived from the original on January 10, 2007.
- "Inconvenient truth of the Korean drama industry". The Dong-A Ilbo. August 1, 2013.
- "Interview with senior actors about Korean dramas". The Dong-A Ilbo. September 30, 2013.
- Iwabuchi, Koichi (2008). East Asian pop culture: analysing the Korean wave. Hong Kong University Press. ISBN 978-962-209-892-3.
- Jeon, Won Kyung (2013). The 'Korean Wave' and television drama exports, 1995–2005 (PDF). University of Glasgow.
- Kim, Ju Young (2007). Rethinking Media Flow under Globalisation: Rising Korean Wave and Korean TV and Film Policy Since 1980s (Dissertation) (phd). Centre for Cultural Policy Studies, University of Warwick.
- Kim, Yang-hee (July 27, 2013). "TV producer's suicide causes troubled industry to reflect". The Hankyoreh.
- Kim, Yang-hee (April 4, 2013). "The unglamorous lives of Korean drama actors". The Hankyoreh.
- K-Drama: A New TV Genre with Global Appeal (pdf). Korean Culture and Information Service. 2011. ISBN 978-89-7375-167-9.
- Korea.net (March 12, 2012). "Korea's fusion sageuk". Korea.net.
- Larsen, Tom (April 24, 2008). "Whetting U.S. appetite for Korean TV dramas". The Korea Herald via Hancinema.
- Lee, Yong-cheol (January 24, 2014). "The Secret of PERIOD DRAMA". Korean Film Council.
- Lee, Diana (2005). "Winter Sonata Drama fever". UNIORB. Archived from the original on December 7, 2013.
- Oh, Youjeong (2015). "The Interactive Nature of Korean TV Dramas: Flexible Texts, Discursive Consumption, and Social Media". In Lee, Sangjoon; Nornes, Abe Mark (eds.). Hallyu 2.0: The Korean Wave in the Age of Social Media. University of Michigan Press. ISBN 978-0-472-07252-1.
- Robinson, Michael E. (1998). "16: Broadcasting in Korea, 1924–1937: Colonial Modernity and Cultural Hegemony". In Sharon A. Minichiello (ed.). Japan's Competing Modernities: Issues in Culture and Democracy, 1900–1930. University of Hawaiʻi Press. ISBN 978-0-8248-2080-0.
- Russell, Mark James (2012). Pop Goes Korea: Behind the Revolution in Movies, Music, and Internet Culture. Stone Bridge Press. ISBN 978-1-61172-542-1.
- Shim, Doobo (2011). Waxing The Korean Wave (PDF). Asia Research Institute, National University of Singapore. Archived from the original (PDF) on November 29, 2015.
- Sung, Sang-Yeon (February 4, 2008). "The High Tide of the Korean Wave III: Why do Asian fans prefer Korean pop culture?". The Korea Herald. Archived from the original on March 24, 2012.
- Turnbull, James (March 17, 2009). "What Defines a Korean Drama?". The Grand Narrative. Archived from the original on December 9, 2011.
- X (November 2009). 영원한 제국 (Eternal Empire) and Chungmuro's Love-Hate for History. Twitch Film. Archived from the original on June 2, 2014.
- X (May 14, 2007). "Sageuk, Korea's 80 Year Long Love for History". Yumcha!.
