= HLKZ-TV =

South Korean television station

- Country: South Korea
- Broadcast area: Seoul

Programming
- Language: Korean

Ownership
- Owner: Daehan Broadcasting

History
- Launched: 12 May 1956; 70 years ago
- Closed: 15 October 1961; 65 years ago
- Replaced by: KBS TV
- Former names: KORCAD-TV (1956–1957)

Availability

Terrestrial
- Seoul: Channel 9

HLKZ-TV, better known as the Daehan Broadcasting Company (DBC), was the first television station in South Korea. It was established by the Korean RCA Distribution Company (KORCAD) and was later handed over to local interests. A fire in 1959 damaged the station's finances and was subsequently closed. The Korean Broadcasting System later acquired its frequency to create its own channel in 1961.

== History ==
On May 2, 1954, the Hankook Ilbo reported on the first television exhibit in Seoul, held in Jong-Ro, at an RCA retail outlet, displaying a CT-100, showing a test image of Seoul's skyline. Hwang Tae-young, who was working for the company, went to New York to sign a contract with RCA worth $1.8 million. Hwang's station was almost rejected, because radio was limited to government and religious stations founded by American missionaries.

On May 12, 1956, HLKZ-TV started broadcasting, under an $40,000 grant shared between Hwang Tae-young and RCA. The station was believed to be a ploy for RCA to sell television sets to what was, in practice, a third-world country in economic terms. HLKZ-TV enabled South Korea to become the seventeenth country to introduce television in the world, and the fourth in Asia, behind Thailand's Thai Television (1955), the Philippines with the Alto Broadcasting System (1953) and Japan with NHK Television and Nippon Television (both 1953).

The first day started with a newsreel at 8pm, followed by Foreign Pilgrimage at 8:15pm, in New York, presumably regarding his trip there. At 8:30, a ten-minute performance of Tchaikovsky's Swan Lake performed by Lee In-Beom's troupe followed, after which came a 20-minute filmed feature from the US, a singing performance at 9pm and a gayageum program (Our Culture) at 9:30pm. The first commercial seen that evening was a slide advertisement for Universal Records.

It operated on VHF channel 9 with an output of 100 watts. In its founding year, there were no less than 300 television sets available in the country. An audience of hundreds of viewers watched the inaugural broadcast on 32 television sets installed in street corners, 25 in newspaper buildings and on school playgrounds throughout Seoul. Regular broadcasts started in June for two hours a day, while in November, it started broadcasting six days a week, taking Fridays off (ironically, a few years later, Fridays would become the main night for dramas). Despite heavy advertising on newspapers, few people could afford a television set, which cost five times a sack of rice.

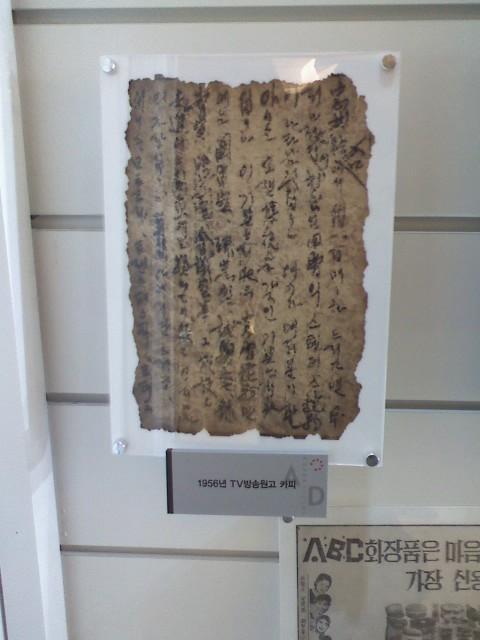
HLKZ-TV drama script from 1956

The first film broadcast by the station was Death Row Prisoner, directed by Choi Chang Bong, while the first TV drama broadcast was an adaptation of Heaven's Gate, an Irish play, in August. Still in 1956, it broadcast an animated commercial for Lucky Toothpaste (Lucky now being a part of the LG conglomerate, the unit being a part of LG Chem since 2009), the first animation produced for television.

The station only had a single 120 square meter studio and aimed at westernizing its audience compared to radio, which had a strong nation-building message to heal the wounds of the Japanese occupation, with America seen as the example to follow. Most of the programs were adapted from US formats, such as The 100,000 Hwan Quiz, adapted from The $64,000 Question, while films donated by the United States Information Service were frequently used to fill airtime.

Facing financial problems (losing four million hwan a month), KORCAD sold the station to the Daehan Broadcasting Company, a subsidiary of the Hankook Ilbo, on May 6, 1957. The two-hour schedule as KORCAD TV was replaced by a one-hour limited schedule, with the bulk of its offer consisting of educational programs aimed at children, to counter its initial purpose as a street attraction. Over time, its programming increased, and the airing of dramas moved from monthly to weekly (Tuesday Night Theater), which mostly consisted of half-hour adaptations of foreign plays. It was the only television station in Korea before the start of AFKN TV (channel 2) on September 15, 1957.

On February 2, 1959, a fire broke at the DBC facilities, causing the station to go off the air. The exact cause of the fire is unknown, with three possible theories: arson from radio executives, problems with a sponsor or human error. Facing these issues, the station restarted on March 1 with support from AFKN, with a half-hour program produced by USIS, until a compromise was reached. The half-hour program, American Holiday, was broadcast on AFKN's channel 2 until 1961. Finally, the station was closed on October 15, 1961, with the government taking over the frequency, initially aiming for a 1962 launch, but was pushed ahead for December 31, 1961. Since then, KBS Television has been broadcasting in the frequency.
