= Korean War in popular culture =

Korean War depicted in popular culture

Korean War poster

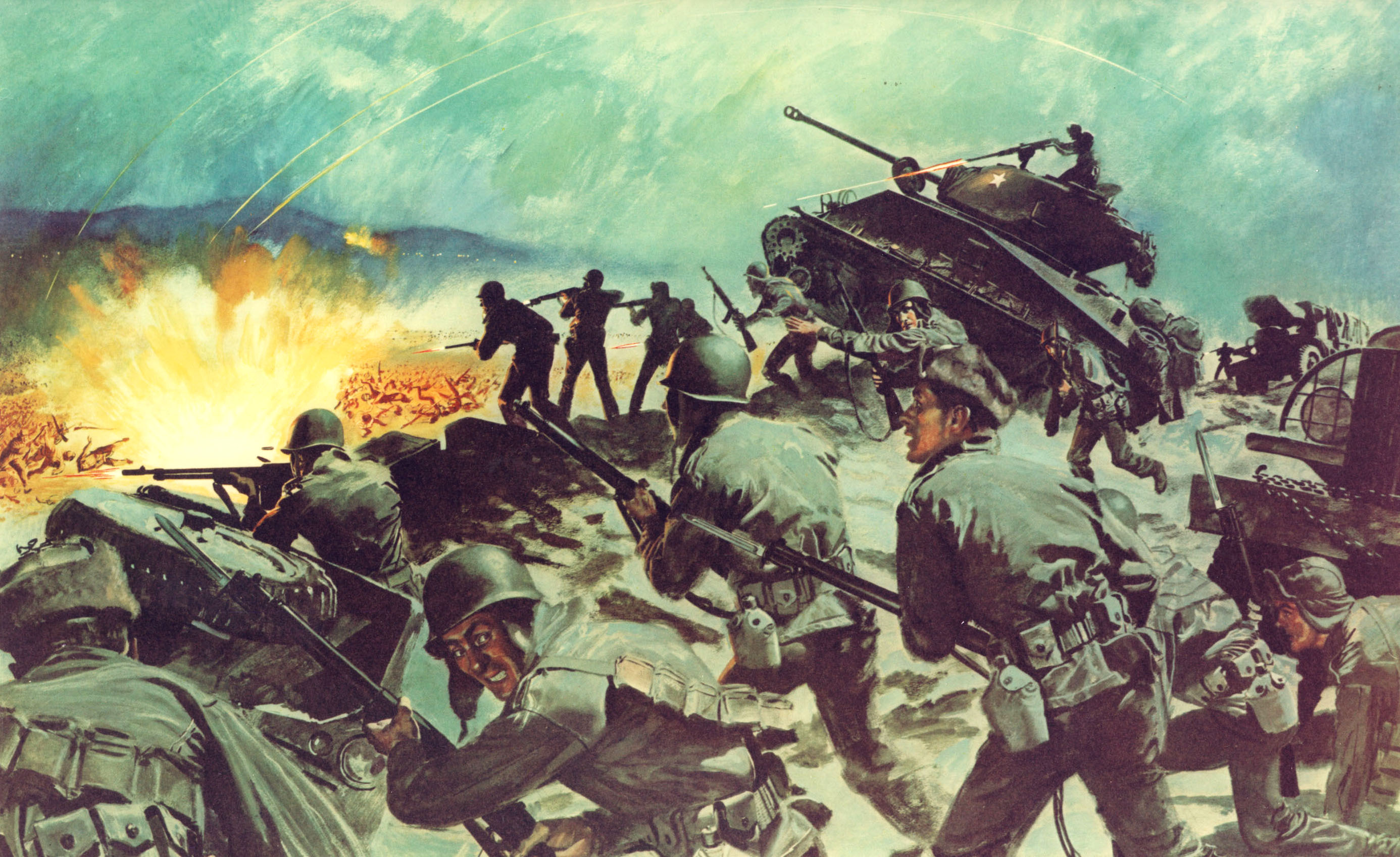
U.S. Army poster depicting the breakthrough at the Battle of Chipyong-ni

Many films, books, and other media have depicted the 1950—53 Korean War. The TV series M*A*S*H is one well known example. The 1959 novel The Manchurian Candidate has twice been made into films. The 1982 film Inchon about the historic battle that occurred there in September 1950 was a financial and critical failure. By 2000 Hollywood alone had produced 91 feature films on the Korean War. Many films have also been produced in South Korea and other countries as well.

== Film ==
Compared to World War II, there are relatively few Western feature films depicting the Korean War.

=== American films ===
- The Steel Helmet (1951) is a war film directed by Samuel Fuller and produced by Lippert Studios during the Korean War. It was the first studio film about the war, and the first of several war films by producer-director-writer Fuller.
- Fixed Bayonets! (1951), U.S. soldiers in Korea surviving the harsh winter of 1951. Directed by Samuel Fuller.
- Battle Circus (1953). A love story of a hard-bitten surgeon and a new nurse at a M.A.S.H. unit. It starred Humphrey Bogart and June Allyson and was directed by Richard Brooks.
- P.O.W. (1953), an American teleplay about soldiers recovering from brainwashing and abuse in a Communist prisoner of war camp.
- Prisoner of War (1954), starring Ronald Reagan.
- Men of the Fighting Lady (1954), Fictional account of U.S. Navy pilots flying F9F Panther fighter jets on hazardous missions against ground targets. Directed by Andrew Marton and starring Van Johnson.
- The Bamboo Prison (1954) stars Robert Francis, E.G. Marshall and Brian Keith in a story set in a North Korean POW camp.
- The McConnell Story (1955) Air Force pilot Joseph C. McConnell who served as a navigator in World War II before becoming the top American ace during the Korean War.
- Target Zero (1955), U.S., British, and South Korean troops are trapped behind enemy lines.
- The Bridges at Toko-Ri (1955) stars William Holden as a Naval Aviator assigned to destroy the bridges at Toko Ri, while battling doubts; it is based on a James Michener novel.
- Men in War (1957), an American film directed by Anthony Mann and starring Robert Ryan and Aldo Ray.
- Battle Hymn (1957) stars Rock Hudson as Colonel Dean Hess, a preacher who became a pilot. He accidentally destroyed a German orphanage during World War II, and rejoins the USAF in Korea; he rescued orphans during that war.
- The Hunters (1958), adapted from the novel The Hunters by James Salter, stars Robert Mitchum and Robert Wagner as two very different United States Air Force fighter pilots in the midst of the Korean War.
- Pork Chop Hill (1959) is a Lewis Milestone-directed film with Gregory Peck as an infantry lieutenant fighting the bitterly fierce first Battle of Pork Chop Hill, between the US Army's 7th Infantry Division, and Chicom (Chinese Communist) forces at war's end in April 1953. The movie is lampooned by the Firesign Theatre album Don't Crush That Dwarf, Hand Me the Pliers in the story of Lieutenant Tirebiter.
- The Manchurian Candidate (1962), adapted from a thriller novel The Manchurian Candidate (1959), directed by John Frankenheimer, and featuring Frank Sinatra and Angela Lansbury. It is about brainwashed POWs of the US Army and an officer's investigation to learn what happened to him and his platoon in the war. The 2004 remake starred Denzel Washington and Meryl Streep.
- The Hook (1963), starring Kirk Douglas, portrays the dilemma of three American soldiers on board a ship who are ordered to kill a North Korean prisoner of war.
- M*A*S*H (film) (1970) and a M*A*S*H (TV series) (1972), adapted from MASH: A Novel About Three Army Doctors (1968), by Richard Hooker (pseudonym for H. Richard Hornberger)
- Inchon (1982), portrays the Battle of Inchon, a turning point in the war. Controversially, the film was partially financed by Sun Myung Moon's Unification Movement. It became a notorious financial and critical failure, losing an estimated $40 million of its $46 million budget, and remains the last mainstream Hollywood film to use the war as its backdrop. The film was directed by Terence Young and starred an elderly Laurence Olivier as General Douglas MacArthur.
- The Forgotten (2004) features a decimated tank unit, lost behind enemy lines, battling the vicissitudes of the war as well as their own demons.
- Devotion (2022), starring Jonathan Majors, Glen Powell.

=== Australian films ===
- Birthday Boy (2004) is a short animated film directed by Sejong Park and produced by Andrew Gregory. It depicts a young boy Manuk playing on the streets of a village in war-stricken Korea. When Manuk returns home he receives a package containing soldier's personal effects. Unable to read and too young to understand its meaning he mistakes the package for a birthday present. The film won 30 film festival awards and was also nominated for Academy Award for Best Animated Short Film.

=== British films ===
- A Hill in Korea (1956) is a British war film. The original name was Hell in Korea, but was changed for distribution reasons, except in the U.S. It was directed by Julian Amyes and the producer was Anthony Squire.

=== Canadian films ===
- Korea: The Unfinished War (2003) is a documentary written and directed by Canadian Brian McKenna, which provides new information and adopts an objective editorial line. It interviews researches that allege that the US committed war crimes by using biological warfare on North Korean territory. The documentary provides information that certain munitions found on the battlefield point to the use of anthrax, bubonic plague and encephalitis by US forces. It also provides information that the US Army deliberately killed civilians on a large scale for fear that the communists were infiltrating them.

=== South Korean films ===
- The Marines Who Never Returned (1963), directed by Lee Man-hee. A film about South Korean marines fighting to the last man against North Korean and Chinese soldiers during the Korean War.
- Spring in My Hometown (1998), directed by Lee Kwang-mo. Though not focused especially on the fighting, takes place in a South Korean village during the war as it deals with the war's upheavals.
- Joint Security Area (2000), directed by Park Chan-wook. In the DMZ (Korean Demilitarized Zone) separating North and South Korea, two North Korean soldiers have been killed, supposedly by one South Korean soldier. The investigating team suspects a cover-up is taking place, but the truth is much simpler and much more tragic. Starring Lee Young-ae, Lee Byung-hun, Song Kang-ho, Kim Tae-woo, and Shin Ha-kyun.
- Taegukgi: The Brotherhood of War (2004), directed by Kang Je-gyu. It became extremely popular in South Korea. At the 50th Asia Pacific Film Festival Taegukgi won Best Film, while Kang Je-gyu was awarded Best Director. Taegukgi saw a limited release in the United States. Starring Jang Dong-gun, Won Bin, and Lee Eun-ju.
- Welcome to Dongmakgol (2005), directed by Park Kwang-hyun. It shows the effect of the warring sides on a remote village. The village becomes home to surviving North Korean and South Korean soldiers, who in time lose their suspicion and hatred for each other and work together to help save the village after the Americans mistakenly identify it as an enemy camp.
- 71: Into the Fire (2010), directed by John H. Lee. Starring Cha Seung-won, Kwon Sang-woo, T.O.P, Kim Seung-woo, and Park Jin-hee.
- Legend of the Patriots (2010), TV Series, Starring Choi Soo-jong
- Road No. 1 (2010), TV series, directed by Lee Jang-soo and Kim Jin-min. Starring So Ji-sub, Kim Ha-neul, and Yoon Kye-sang.
- The Front Line (2011), directed by Jang Hoon. Also known as Battle of Highlands, it is set during the 1953 ceasefire. Starring Shin Ha-kyun, Go Soo, Lee Je-hoon, and Ko Chang-seok.
- Operation Chromite (2016), directed by John H. Lee (Lee Jae-han). Starring Lee Jung-jae, Lee Beom-soo, and Liam Neeson.
- Swing Kids, (2018), directed by Kang Hyeong-cheol
- The Battle of Jangsari (2019), directed by Kwak Kyung-taek. Starring Kim Myung-min, Choi Min-ho, and Megan Fox.

=== North Korean films ===
In North Korea the Korean War has always been a favorite subject of film, both for its dramatic appeal and its potential as propaganda. The North Korean government film industry has produced many scores of films about the war. These have portrayed war crimes by American or South Korean soldiers while glorifying members of the North Korean military as well as North Korean ideals. Some of the most prominent of these films include:

- Unsung Heroes, a multi-part film produced between 1978 and 1981 which included in the cast several American soldiers who had defected to North Korea. It tells the story of a spy in Seoul during the Korean War.
- Wolmi Island, a film based on real life about coastal artillerymen of the Korean People's Navy led by lieutenant Ri Tae Hun who defended Wolmi Island to the last man during the US landing at Inchon.
- Order No. 027, a martial arts film about a unit of Korean People's Army special forces sent behind South Korean lines on a mission to destroy the headquarters of an R.O.K. Special Forces unit and capture priceless documents.
- 72 Hours, a war film dramatized the First Battle of Seoul.

=== Chinese films ===
- Battle on Shangganling Mountain (1956) (Chinese: 上甘岭; pinyin: Shànggān Lǐng) is a famous Chinese war movie about the Battle of Triangle Hill. The story is centered around a group of Chinese soldiers that were trapped in a tunnel several days. Short of both food and water, they hold their grounds till the relief troops arrive. The movie's popularity is largely due to the fact it was one of the few movies that were not banned during the Cultural Revolution.
- Assembly (2007): Parts of this movie depicts Chinese forces in the Korean War, specifically around a special squad of artillery spotters.
- The Sacrifice (2020): The July 12–13, 1953 events of the film at Geumgang River are presented in three main segments from three different perspectives: "Soldiers", "Adversaries", and "Gunners". These are followed by a final segment, "Bridge".
- The Battle at Lake Changjin (2021)
- The Battle at Lake Changjin II (2022)
- Sniper (2022)
- The Volunteers: To the War (2023)
- The Volunteers: The Battle of Life and Death (2024)

=== Philippine films ===
- 10th Battalion sa 38th Parallel, Korea was directed by Gerardo de León.
- Korea (1952) was directed by Lamberto V. Avellana with screenplay by Benigno Aquino Jr.
- Batalyon Pilipino sa Korea (1954) was directed by Carlos Vander Tolosa.
- Lagablab sa Silangan (1956) was directed by Constancio T. Villamar.
- The Forgotten War (2009) tells about Filipinos who fought the battle of Yultong.

=== Thai films ===
- อารีดัง (Aridang): Thai pronunciation of Arirang, directed by Jazz Siam and started Jatupol Puuapirom (1980)

=== Turkish films ===
- Ayla: The Daughter of War (2017) was directed by Can Ulkay.

== Literature ==
In South Korea novelists Pak Wansŏ and Ch’oe Yun and film director Kang Chegyu use the war experience to explore geography, time, memory, and history. Their narratives are set decades after the war ended, but emphasize long-term memories and results.

- Choi In-hun's The Square is one of the most important novels about the Korean War from the 1960s.
- Jo Jung-rae's ten-volume Taebaek Mountain Range was one of the most popular novels in the 1980s. It also covers the Korean War.
- The essay Who are the Most Beloved People? (1951) by Chinese writer Wei Wei is considered to be the most famous literary and propaganda piece produced by China during the Korean War.
- The war-memoir novel Yesterday's War (2001), by Meng Weizai, is a drafted PVA soldier's experience of the war, combat, and espionage between the PVA, Korean People's Army (KPA), UN Command and South Korean Army.
- The war-memoir novel War Trash (2004), by Ha Jin, is a drafted PVA soldier's experience of the war, combat, and captivity under the UN Command, and of the retribution Chinese POWs feared from other PVA prisoners when suspected of being unsympathetic to Communism or to the war.

== Music ==
Singer-songwriter David Rovics sings about the Korean War in his song "Korea" on the album Song for Mahmud.

== Opera ==
- The Peking opera Raid on the White Tiger Regiment is set in July 1953; it depicts a victory of the Chinese and Korean communists over South Korean and American forces.

== Painting ==
Massacre in Korea (1951), by Pablo Picasso, depicts war violence against civilians.

== Sculpture ==
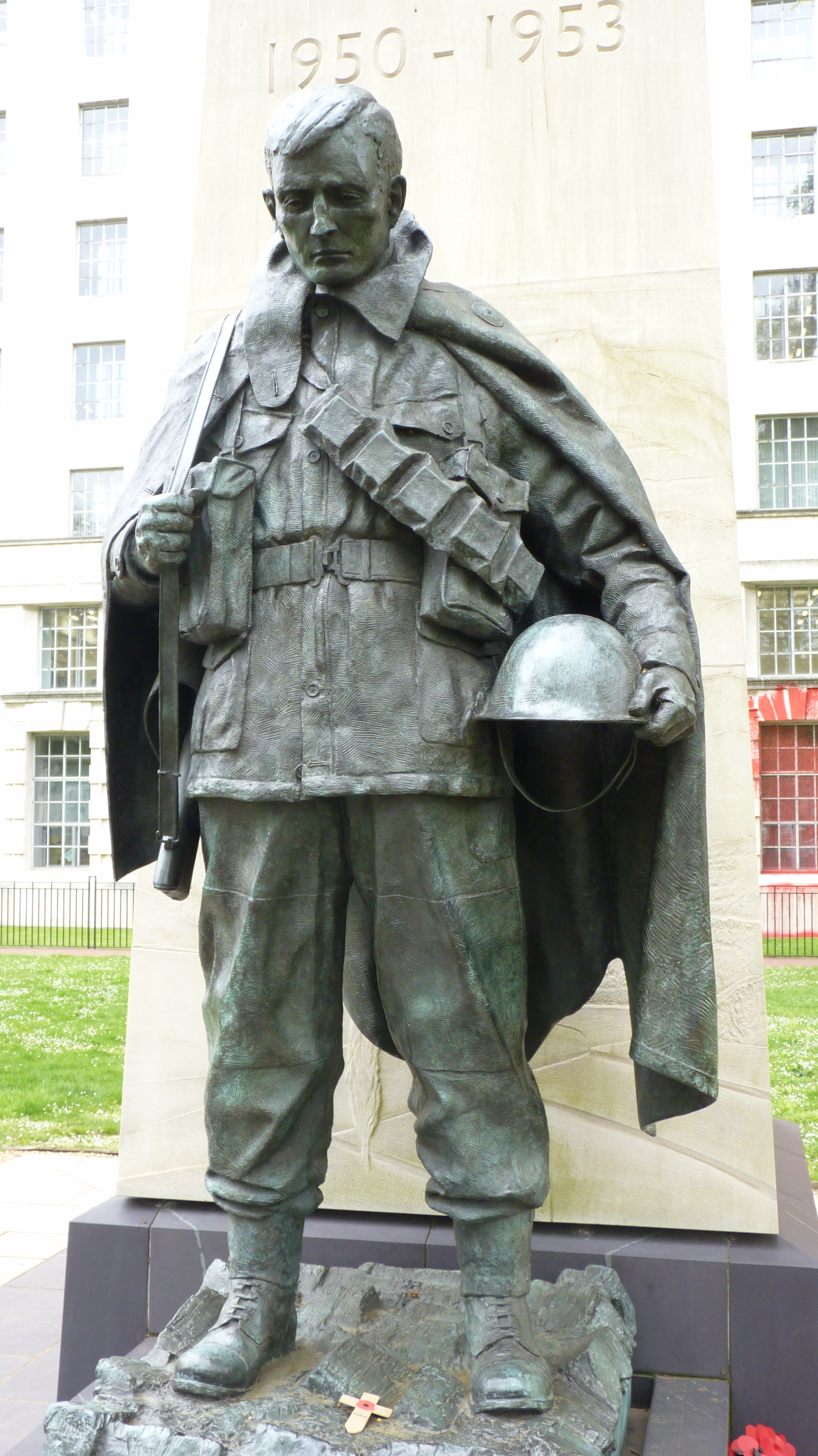
Statue erected in Westminster, London, in 2014 remembering the Korean War

- Australia: Korean War Memorial, Canberra
- United States: Korean War Veterans Memorial

== Television ==
Korean War television series
Television series	Country	Dates	Notes
1st Republic	South Korea	1981–1982	
Birthday Letter	South Korea	2019	
Junwoo	South Korea	1975–1978	
Legend of the Patriots	South Korea	2010	The story of 11 Korean soldiers; the second remake of Junwoo.
M*A*S*H	United States	1972–1983	Based on the novel and film (see above). The TV series had a total of 251 episodes, lasted 11 years, and won awards. Its final episode was the most-watched program in television history. Yet the sensibilities they presented were more of the 1970s than of the 1950s; the Korean War setting was an oblique and uncontroversial treatment of the then-current American war in Vietnam.
Beavis and Butt-Head	United States	1997	In the television series the character Tom Anderson is a veteran of the Korean War and received a Purple Heart. The series’ tenth season features segments where Anderson tells stories of his experiences during various Korean War battles including the Battle of Inchon and the Battle of Heartbreak Ridge.
Road No. 1	South Korea	2010	
Lovecraft Country	United States	2022	In "Meet Me in Daegu", an episode of the HBO show Lovecraft Country, the story takes place in Korea during the war. The main character Atticus is a veteran of the war.

== Theater ==
The Colombian theatrical work El monte calvo (The Barren Mount), created by Jairo Aníbal Niño, used two Colombian veterans of the Korean war, and an ex-clown named Canute to criticize militarist and warmongering views, and to show what war is and what happens to those who live through it.

== Games ==
- SGS Korean War: Released in 2022 by Strategy Game Studio and published by Avalon Digital, this turn-based strategy game covers the operational history of the Korean War.
- Korea. IL-2 Series: Developed by 1C Game Studios as part of the IL-2 Sturmovik combat flight simulator franchise, the game allows players to engage in aerial combat during the Korean War.
- Korean War 1950: Final Defense: A turn-based strategy simulation game for Android released in 2026, it allows players to direct division-level force deployments on tactical map grids. Players command Republic of Korea (ROK) and US-led United Nations forces across key historical operations, including the Battle of Chuncheon, the Battle of Dabudong, the Battle of Inchon, the Recapture of Seoul, the Capture of Pyongyang, and the Battle of Chosin Reservoir.
