= People's Volunteer Army =

Communist Chinese forces during the Korean War

- People's Volunteer Army badge
- Active: 1950–1958 (combat troops); 1954–1994 (delegation)
- Country: China; North Korea
- Allegiance: Chinese Communist Party
- Branch: Army; Air Force
- Type: Combined military formation Expeditionary armed forces
- Role: Combined arms Expeditionary warfare Defend North Korea; Defend Northeast China; Short Attack
- Size: +3 million troops
- Garrison/HQ: North Korea
- Nicknames: 最可爱的人 (Most Beloved People)
- Mottos: 抗美援朝，保家卫国 (English: "Resist U.S. and aid Korea, to defend our homeland")
- Colors: Red
- March: Battle Hymn of the Chinese People's Volunteer Army
- Engagements: Korean War

Commanders
- Notable commanders: Peng Dehuai; Chen Geng; Deng Hua; Hong Xuezhi; Han Xianchu; Song Shilun

People's Volunteer Army
- Simplified Chinese: 中国人民志愿军
- Traditional Chinese: 中國人民志願軍
- Literal meaning: "Chinese People's Volunteer Army"
Transcriptions
Standard Mandarin
- Hanyu Pinyin: Zhōngguó Rénmín Zhìyuànjūn
- Bopomofo: ㄓㄨㄥ ㄍㄨㄛˊㄖㄣˊ ㄇㄧㄣˊㄓˋ ㄩㄢˋㄐㄩㄣ
- Wade–Giles: Chung-kuo Jen-min Chih-yüan-chün
Yue: Cantonese
- Jyutping: Zung^{1}gwok^{3} Jan^{4}man^{4} Zi^{3}jyun^{6}gwan^{1}

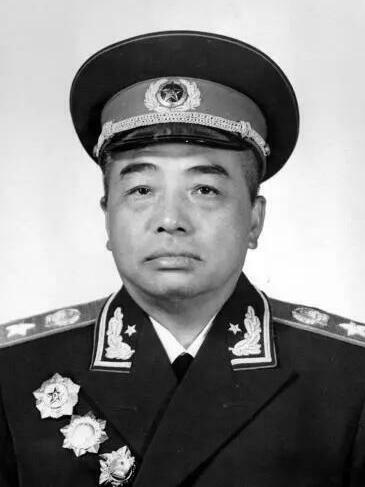
First commander and commissar of the PVA Peng Dehuai (1950–1952)

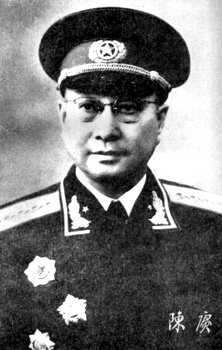
Second commander and commissar of the PVA Chen Geng (1952)

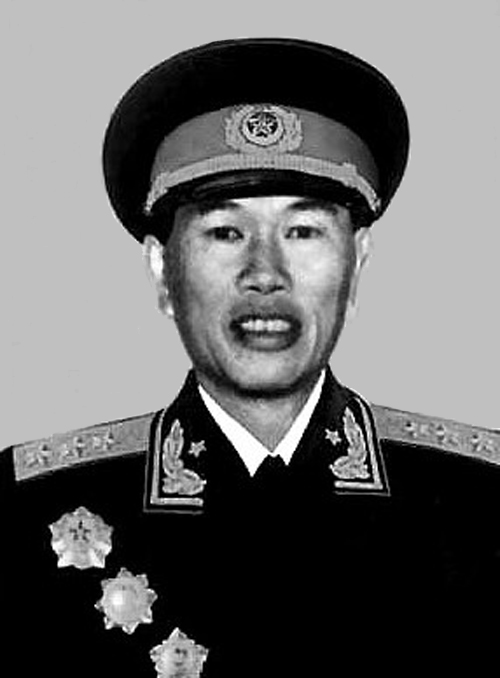
Third commander and commissar of the PVA Deng Hua (1952–1953)

The People's Volunteer Army (PVA), officially the Chinese People's Volunteers (CPV), was the designation for the Chinese communist contingent of armed expeditionary forces deployed by the People's Republic of China during the Korean War. (Note: Western sources often refer to the Chinese People's Volunteer Army by using the term Chinese Communist Forces (CCF), a title which was synonymous with the Chinese People's Liberation Army during the Cold War.) Although all units in the PVA were actually transferred from the People's Liberation Army (PLA) under the orders of Chairman Mao Zedong, the PVA was separately constituted in order to prevent an official war with the United States. The PVA entered Korea on 19 October 1950 and completely withdrew by October 1958. The nominal commander and political commissar of the PVA was Peng Dehuai before the ceasefire agreement in 1953, although both Chen Geng and Deng Hua served as the acting commander and commissar after April 1952 following Peng's illness. The initial (25 October – 5 November 1950) units in the PVA included 38th, 39th, 40th, 42nd, 50th, 66th Corps; totalling 250,000 men. About 3 million Chinese civilian and military personnel had served in Korea throughout the war.

== Background ==
=== Formation ===
Although the United Nations Command (UNC) forces were under United States command, this army was officially a UN "police" force. In order to avoid an open war with the U.S. and other UN members, the People's Republic of China deployed the People's Liberation Army (PLA) under the name "volunteer army".

About the name, there were various opinions. According to some scholars during the mid-1990s, after the PRC made the strategic decision to send soldiers to Korea, the first name of this army was "support army". However, Huang Yanpei, the vice premier of the Government Administration Council of the Central People's Government at that time, suggested that the name "support army" might cause the international community to assume that China was sending soldiers as an act of direct aggression against the United States. Therefore, the army's name was modified to "volunteer army" while different unit designations and footings were used instead, to give the impression that China did not intend to declare war against the U.S. but rather that Chinese soldiers were only present on Korean battlefields as individual volunteers. On the other hand, some recent studies show that the change was not only Huang's advice. On 7 July 1950, the name had already been changed to "volunteer army" by Chinese Premier Zhou Enlai on his manuscript about the decision of the army's clothing and flags.

Despite arguments on the changing from "People's Support Army" to "People's Volunteer Army", the name was also a homage to the Korean Volunteer Army that had helped the Chinese communists during the Second Sino-Japanese War and the Chinese Civil War. It also managed to deceive the U.S. intelligence and the UN about the size and nature of the Chinese forces that entered Korea. They later realized that the PVA was the PLA's North East Frontier Force (NEFF), with other PLA formations transferred under NEFF's command as the Korean War dragged on. But the result was that they still admitted the name, "People's Volunteer Army", in order to minimize the war within the Korean Peninsula and prevent escalation of the war.

=== Decisions to enter war ===
On 30 June, five days after the outbreak of the war, Zhou decided to send a group of Chinese military intelligence personnel to North Korea to establish better communications with Kim as well as to collect firsthand materials on the fighting. One week later, on 7 July, Zhou and Mao chaired a conference discussing military preparations for the Korean Conflict. Another conference took place on 10 July. Here, it was decided that the Thirteenth Army Group under the Fourth Field Army of the PLA, one of the best-trained and best-equipped units in China, would be immediately transformed into the Northeastern Border Defense Army (NEBDA) to prepare for "an intervention in the Korean War if necessary". On 13 July, the CMCC formally issued the order to establish the NEBDA, appointing Deng Hua, the commander of the Fifteenth Army Corps and one of the most talented commanders of the Chinese Civil War, to coordinate all preparation efforts.

On 20 August Zhou informed the UN that "Korea is China's neighbor... The Chinese people cannot but be concerned about a solution of the Korean question". Thus, through neutral-country diplomats, China warned that in safeguarding Chinese national security, they would intervene against the UN Command in Korea. U.S. President Harry S. Truman interpreted the communication as "a bald attempt to blackmail the UN", and dismissed it. Mao ordered that his troops should be ready for action by the end of August. Soviet leader Joseph Stalin, by contrast, was reluctant to escalate the war with a Chinese intervention.

On 1 October the Soviet ambassador forwarded a telegram from Stalin to Mao and Zhou requesting that China send five to six divisions into Korea, and Kim sent frantic appeals to Mao for Chinese military intervention. At the same time, Stalin made it clear that Soviet forces would not directly intervene. In a series of emergency meetings that lasted from 2 to 5 October, Chinese leaders debated whether to send Chinese troops into Korea. There was considerable resistance among many leaders, including senior military leaders, to confronting the U.S. in Korea. Mao strongly supported intervention, and Zhou was one of the few Chinese leaders who firmly supported him. Mao appointed Peng Dehuai commander of the Chinese forces in Korea. Peng made the case that if U.S. troops conquered Korea and reached the Yalu River, they might cross it and invade China; the Politburo agreed to intervene in Korea. On 4 August, with a planned invasion of Taiwan aborted because of heavy U.S. naval presence, Mao had reported to the Politburo that he would intervene in Korea when the PLA's Taiwan invasion force was reorganized into the PLA North East Frontier Force.

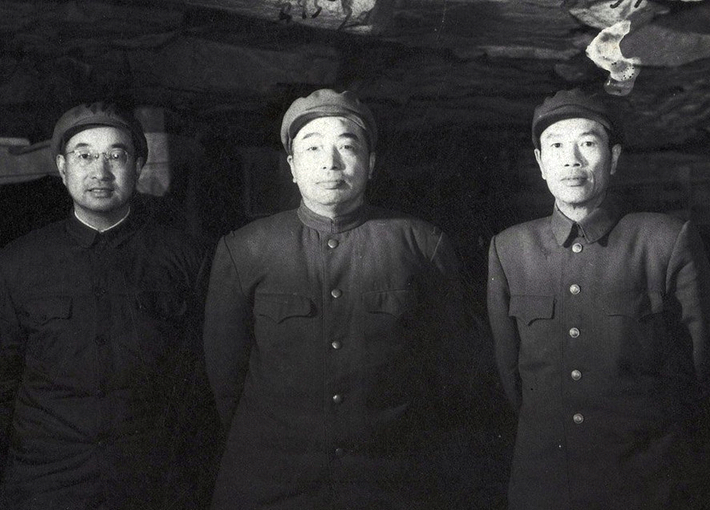
Three commanders of the PVA during the Korean War. From left to right: Chen Geng (1952); Peng Dehuai (1950–1952); and Deng Hua (1952–1953).

On 8 October, the day after UN troops crossed the 38th parallel and began their offensive into North Korea, Chairman Mao issued the order for the NEFF to be moved to the Yalu River, ready to cross. Mao redesignated the NEFF as the People's Volunteer Army. To enlist Stalin's support, Zhou and a Chinese delegation arrived in Russia on 10 October. They conferred with the top Soviet leadership, which included Stalin, Vyacheslav Molotov, Lavrentiy Beria and Georgy Malenkov. Mao saw intervention as essentially defensive: "If we allow the U.S. to occupy all of Korea... we must be prepared for the U.S. to declare... war with China", he told Stalin.

Mao delayed his forces while waiting for Soviet help, and the planned attack was thus postponed from 13 October to 19 October. Soviet assistance was limited to providing air support no closer than 60 miles (97 km) from the battlefront. The MiG-15s in PRC colours would be an unpleasant surprise to the UN pilots; they would hold local air superiority against the F-80 Shooting Stars until newer F-86 Sabres were deployed. The Soviet role was known to the U.S., but they kept quiet to avoid any international and potential nuclear incidents. It has been alleged by the Chinese that the Soviets had agreed to full scale air support, which never occurred south of Pyongyang, and helped accelerate the Sino-Soviet split.

Stalin initially agreed to send military equipment and ammunition but warned Zhou that the Soviet Air Force would need two or three months to prepare any operations. In a subsequent meeting, Stalin told Zhou that he would only provide China with equipment on a credit basis and that the Soviet Air Force would only operate over Chinese airspace, and only after an undisclosed period of time. Stalin did not agree to send either military equipment or air support until March 1951. Mao did not find Soviet air support especially useful, as the fighting was going to take place on the south side of the Yalu. Soviet shipments of matériel, when they did arrive, were limited to small quantities of trucks, grenades, machine guns, and the like.

In a meeting on 13 October, the Politburo decided that China would intervene even in the absence of Soviet air support, basing its decision on a belief that superior morale could defeat an enemy that had superior equipment. Immediately on his return to Beijing on 18 October, Zhou met with Mao, Peng and Gao, and the group ordered 200,000 PVA troops to enter North Korea, which they did on 19 October. UN aerial reconnaissance had difficulty sighting PVA units in daytime, because their march and bivouac discipline minimized aerial detection. The PVA marched "dark-to-dark" (19:00–03:00), and aerial camouflage (concealing soldiers, pack animals, and equipment) was deployed by 05:30. Meanwhile, daylight advance parties scouted for the next bivouac site. During daylight activity or marching, soldiers were to remain motionless if an aircraft appeared, until it flew away; PVA officers were under order to shoot security violators. Such battlefield discipline allowed a three-division army to march the 460 km (286 mi) from An-tung, Manchuria, to the combat zone in some 19 days. Another division night-marched a circuitous mountain route, averaging 29 km (18 mi) daily for 18 days.

China justified its entry into the war as a response to what it described as "American aggression in the guise of the UN". Chinese decision-makers feared that the American-led invasion of North Korea was part of a U.S. strategy to invade China ultimately. They were also worried about rising counterrevolutionary activity at home. MacArthur's public statements that he wanted to extend the Korean War into China, and return the Kuomintang regime to power reinforced this fear. Later, the Chinese claimed that U.S. bombers had violated PRC national airspace on three separate occasions and attacked Chinese targets before China intervened.

The collapse of the North Korean Korean People's Army (KPA) in September/October 1950 following the Battle of Inchon, the Pusan Perimeter offensive and the UN September 1950 counteroffensive alarmed the PRC government. The PRC had issued warnings that they would intervene if any non-South Korean forces crossed the 38th parallel, citing national security interests.

On 15 October Truman traveled to Wake Island to discuss with UN Commander General Douglas MacArthur the possibility of Chinese intervention and his desire to limit the scope of the Korean War. MacArthur reassured Truman that "if the Chinese tried to get down to Pyongyang there would be the greatest slaughter."

== Equipment ==
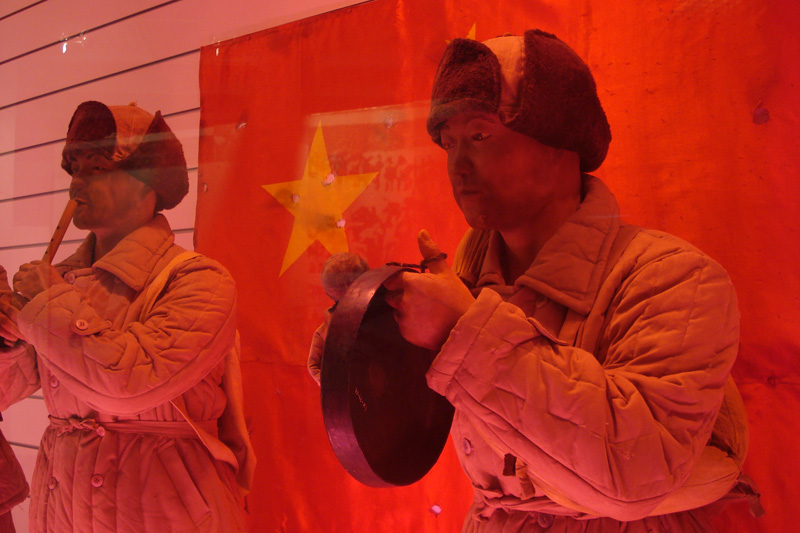
Uniform of the PVA. Note the flute and the gong, which was what the PVA soldiers typically used for communications in battle.

The PVA soldier was reasonably well clothed. In keeping with the PLA's guerrilla origin and egalitarian attitudes, all ranks wore a cotton or woolen shirt-and-trousers combination green or khaki in color, with leaders' uniforms being different in cut.

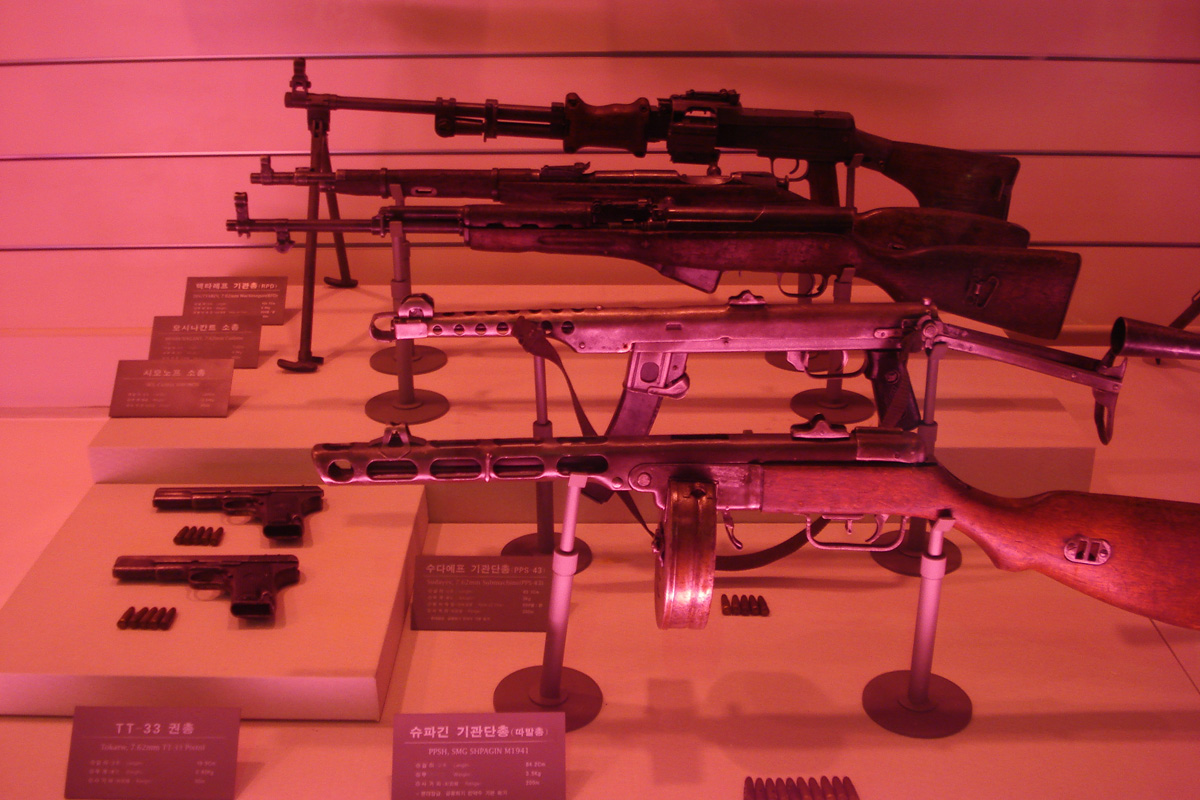
Typical firearms used by the PVA

The nominal strength of a PLA division was 9,500 men, with a regiment comprising 3,000 and a battalion consisting of 850. However, many divisions sent to Korea were below-strength while the divisions stationed opposite Taiwan were above-strength. There was also variation in organization and equipment as well as in the quantity and quality of the military equipment. Some of the PLA's equipment was from the Imperial Japanese Army or were captured from the Kuomintang military forces. Some Czechoslovak-made weapons were also purchased on the open market by the PRC.

During the PVA's First Phase Offensive in the Korean War between October and November 1950, large quantities of captured U.S. weapons were widely used because of the availability of the required ammunition and the increasing difficulty of re-supplying across the Yalu River because of numerous UN-conducted air interdiction operations. In addition, there was also a local copy of the U.S. Thompson submachine gun being produced by the PRC, based on the type of which had already been exported to and used in China since the 1930s and by UN troops during the Korean War.

Later on, after the first year of the Korean War, the Soviet Union began to send more weapons and ammunition to the PRC, which started to produce licensed copies of some types of Soviet weapons, such as the PPSh-41 submachine gun, which was designated as the Type 50. In addition to surplus WWII Soviet arms, the Soviet Union also provided some WWII German small arms to the Chinese like the Karabiner 98k rifle. Surplus Mauser ammunition were also supplied by the Soviet Union or were available from stocks left behind by the KMT forces who also used German ammunition.

== Actions ==
=== First Phase campaign (25 October–5 November 1950) ===
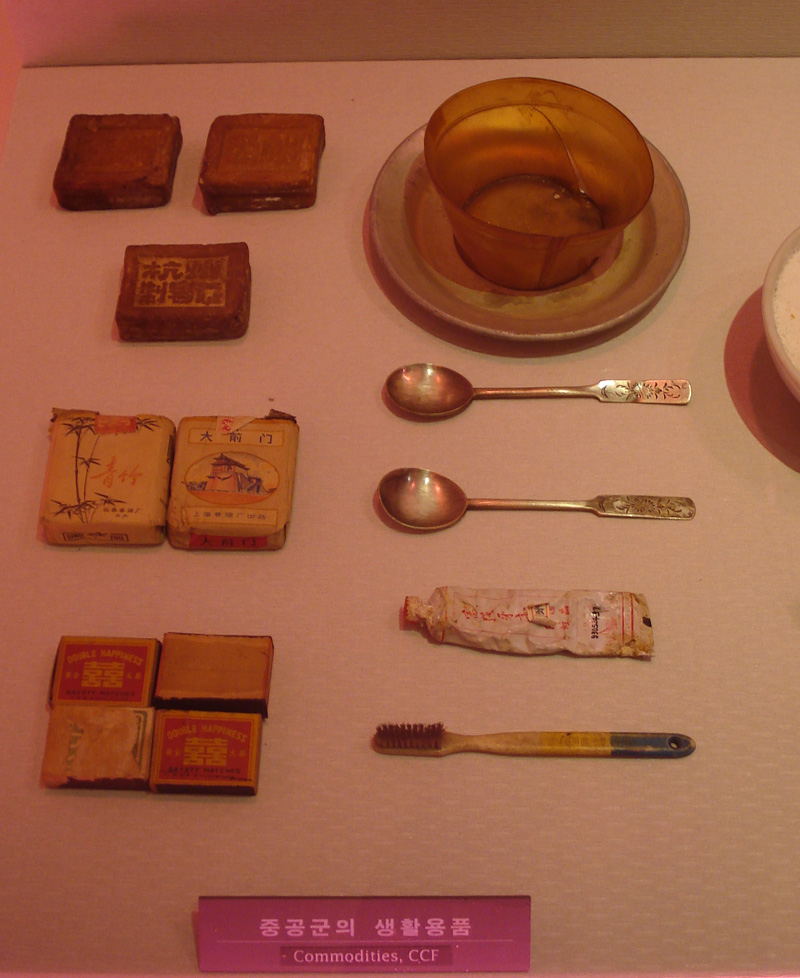
PVA rations and mess kits

On 19 October Pyongyang was captured by UN forces. On the same day, the PVA began crossing the Yalu River under strict secrecy. The initial PVA assault began on 25 October under the command of Peng Dehuai with 270,000 PVA troops (it was assumed at the time that Lin Biao was in charge, but this notion had been disproved).

The PVA assault caught the UN troops by surprise, and employing great skill and remarkable camouflage ability, the PVA concealed their numerical and divisional strength after the first engagement with the UN. After these initial engagements, the Chinese withdrew into the mountains. UN forces interpreted this withdrawal as a show of weakness; they thought that this initial attack was all that the Chinese forces were capable of undertaking.

=== Second Phase campaign (25 November–24 December 1950) ===
On 25 November the PVA struck again along the entire Korean front. In the west, at the Battle of the Ch'ongch'on River, the PVA overran several UN divisions and landed an extremely heavy blow into the flank of the remaining UN forces, decimating the U.S. 2nd Infantry Division in the process. In December 1950, Chinese forces captured Pyongyang. The city saw a massive evacuation of refugees alongside UN forces heading south in order to avoid the advancing PVA. The resulting UN retreat from North Korea was the longest retreat of an American unit in history. In the east, at the Battle of Chosin Reservoir, Task Force Faith—a 3,000 man unit from the 7th Infantry Division—was surrounded by the PVA 80th and the 81st Divisions. Task Force Faith managed to inflict heavy casualties onto the PVA divisions, but in the end it was destroyed with 2,000 men killed or captured, and losing all vehicles and most other equipment. The destruction of Task Force Faith was considered by the PVA to be their biggest success of the entire Korean War.

The 1st Marine Division fared better; though surrounded and forced to retreat, they inflicted heavy casualties on the PVA, who committed six divisions trying to destroy the Marines. Although the PVA were able to recapture much of North Korea during the Second Phase campaign, 40% of the PVA was rendered combat ineffective—a loss which they could not recover from until the start of the Chinese spring offensive.

UN forces in northeast Korea withdrew to form a defensive perimeter around the port city of Hŭngnam, where an evacuation was carried out in late December. Approximately 100,000 military personnel and material and another 100,000 North Korean civilians were loaded onto a variety of merchant and military transport ships.

=== Third Phase Campaign (31 December 1950–8 January 1951) ===
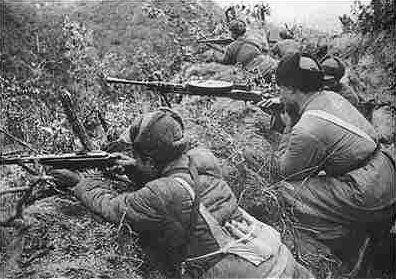
Chinese infantrymen in the Battle of Triangle Hill

Hoping to pressure the UN into abandoning South Korea, Mao ordered the PVA to attack the UN forces along the 38th parallel. On the last day of 1950, PVA/KPA forces attacked several ROK divisions along the parallel, breaching the UN defenses in the process. To avoid another encirclement, UN forces evacuated Seoul on 3 January, and PVA/KPA forces recaptured the city on 4 January. Both the Eighth Army and the US X Corps retreated another 50 miles (80 km), but the overextended PVA were completely exhausted after months of nonstop fighting.

=== Fourth Phase Campaign (30 January–21 April 1951) ===
The overextended PVA were forced to disengage and to recuperate for an extensive period of time, but the UN forces soon returned to the offensive. On 23 January 1951 the Eighth Army launched Operation Thunderbolt, attacking the unprepared PVA/KPA forces south of the Han River. This was followed up with Operation Roundup by X Corps in central Korea.

Hoping to regain the initiative, the PVA counterattacked at the Battle of Hoengsong on 11 February, stopping X Corps' advance in the process. But without proper rest and recuperation, the new offensive soon fizzled out at the Battle of Chipyong-ni on 15 February. With the entire PVA incapable of any further offensive operations, the Eighth Army launched Operation Killer on 21 February, followed by Operation Ripper on 6 March. The Eighth Army expelled the PVA/KPA troops from Seoul on 16 March, destroying much of the city with aerial and artillery bombardments in the process.

=== Fifth Phase Campaign (22 April–22 May 1951) ===
The PVA counterattacked on 22 April 1951 in a major offensive with three field armies (approximately 700,000 men). The offensive's first thrust fell upon U.S. I Corps and IX Corps which fiercely resisted, blunting the impetus of the offensive, which was halted at the No-Name Line north of Seoul. On 15 May the PVA commenced the second impulse of the offensive and attacked the ROK and the X Corps in the east, and initially were successful, yet they were halted by 22 May.

On 20 May the Eighth Army counterattacked the exhausted PVA/KPA forces in the UN May-June 1951 counteroffensive, inflicting heavy losses. The destruction of the PVA 180th Division of the 60th Army during the counterattack has been considered to be the worst Chinese defeat during the entire Korean War. Roughly 3,000 men managed to escape (including the division commander and other high-ranking officers), but the majority of the division were killed or captured. During the final days of the Fifth Phase Campaign, the main body of the 180th Division was encircled during a UN counterattack, and after days of hard fighting, the division was fragmented, and the regiments fled in all directions. Soldiers either deserted or were abandoned by their officers during failed attempts to wage guerrilla warfare without support from the local people. Finally, out of ammunition and food, some 5,000 soldiers were captured. The division commander and other officers who escaped were subsequently investigated and demoted on return to China.

=== Stalemate (10 June 1951–27 July 1953) ===
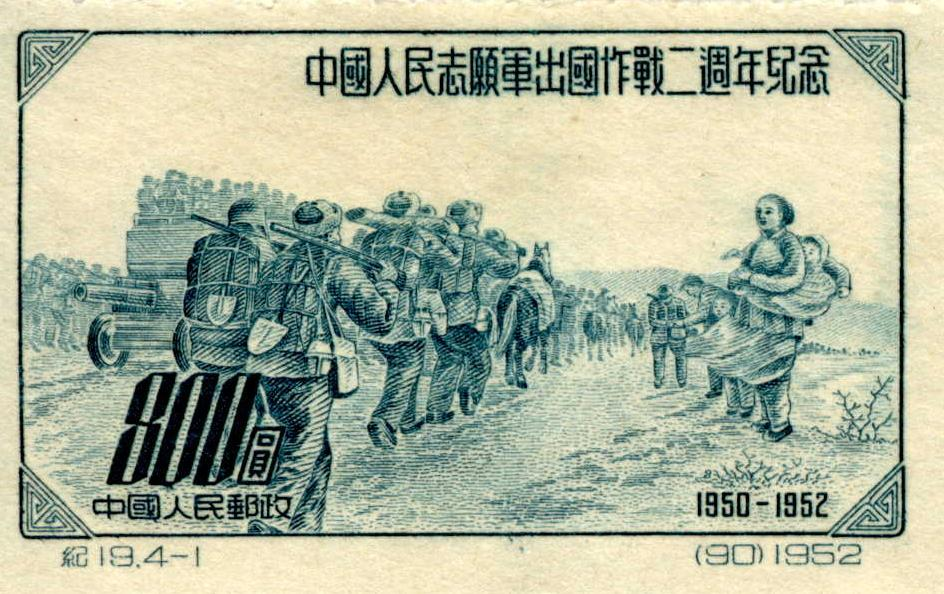
Chinese troops in Korea depicted on a 1952 Chinese postage stamp

The UN counterattack in the aftermath of the spring offensive stabilized the front roughly along the 38th parallel. The rest of the war involved little territory change, large-scale bombing of the population in the north, and lengthy peace negotiations, which started in Kaesong on 10 July 1951. Even during the peace negotiations, combat continued. For the UN forces, the goal was to recapture all of what had been South Korea before an agreement was reached in order to avoid loss of any territory and the PVA attempted similar operations. A major issue of the negotiations was repatriation of POWs. The Chinese and North Koreans insisted on forcible repatriation, while the UN insisted on voluntary repatriation. The war continued until the Chinese and North Koreans eventually dropped this issue.

On 29 November 1952 U.S. President-elect Dwight D. Eisenhower fulfilled a campaign promise by going to Korea to find out what could be done to end the war. With the UN's and PVA's acceptance of India's proposal for an armistice, fighting ended 27 July 1953, by which time the front line was back around the proximity of the 38th parallel. A demilitarized zone was established along the Military Demarcation Line, which is patrolled to this day by North Korean troops on one side and South Korean and American troops on the other.

== Tactics ==
PVA forces used rapid attacks on the flanks and rear and infiltration behind UN lines to give the appearance of superior numbers. This, of course, was augmented by the PVA tactic of maximizing their forces for the attack, ensuring a large local numerical superiority over their opponent. The initial PVA victories were a great morale booster for the PVA. However, by late 1951, overextended supply lines and superior UN firepower had forced a stalemate. The KPA that invaded in 1950 had been much better supplied and armed by the Soviets than the PVA had been. The main arms of the PVA were captured Japanese and Nationalist arms.

Historian and Korean War veteran Bevin Alexander had this to say about Chinese tactics in his book How Wars Are Won:

The Chinese had no air power and were armed only with rifles, machineguns, hand grenades, and mortars. Against the much more heavily armed Americans, they adapted a technique they had used against the Nationalists in the Chinese civil war of 1946–49. The Chinese generally attacked at night and tried to close in on a small troop position—generally a platoon—and then attacked it with local superiority in numbers. The usual method was to infiltrate small units, from a platoon of fifty men to a company of 200, split into separate detachments. While one team cut off the escape route of the Americans, the others struck both the front and the flanks in concerted assaults. The attacks continued on all sides until the defenders were destroyed or forced to withdraw. The Chinese then crept forward to the open flank of the next platoon position, and repeated the tactics.

Roy Appleman further clarified the initial Chinese tactics as:

In the First Phase Offensive, highly skilled enemy light infantry troops had carried out the Chinese attacks, generally unaided by any weapons larger than mortars. Their attacks had demonstrated that the Chinese were well-trained disciplined fire fighters, and particularly adept at night fighting. They were masters of the art of camouflage. Their patrols were remarkably successful in locating the positions of the U.N. forces. They planned their attacks to get in the rear of these forces, cut them off from their escape and supply roads, and then send in frontal and flanking attacks to precipitate the battle. They also employed a tactic which they termed Hachi Shiki, which was a V-formation into which they allowed enemy forces to move; the sides of the V then closed around their enemy while another force moved below the mouth of the V to engage any forces attempting to relieve the trapped unit. Such were the tactics the Chinese used with great success at Onjong, Unsan, and Ch'osan, but with only partial success at Pakch'on and the Ch'ongch'on bridgehead.

== Discipline and political control ==
The discipline of the PVA was strict by Western standards, a notable improvement when compared to the Nationalist and warlord armies that ruled the country from 1912 until 1949. Discipline was applied universally within the army, with the Chinese Communist Party (CCP) members expected to be punished more than non-Party soldiers for the same infraction. Beatings and abuses were forbidden by regulations. Although capital punishment was enforced for disobeying certain orders, it was rarely used in accordance with the Chinese traditions. Normally, public shamings and political indoctrination camps were the preferred methods for dealing with serious infractions such as desertion, and the punished were expected to return to frontline duty with their original units.

Like the Soviet Army, political and military officers formed a dual chain of command within the PVA, and this dual-command structure existed as low as the company level. Political officers were in charge of the control and the morale of the troops, and they were often expected to act like role models in combat. Unlike other communist armies of the same period, although the political officers had authority over military officers on combat decisions, the military officers could issue orders without political officers' approval. Similarly, the line between military and political officers were often blurred in the PVA, since the political officers often had extensive military experiences while most military officers were senior Party members within a unit.

Besides the political officers, Party members and Party candidates also enforced political controls within the ranks. Squads were often divided into three-man fireteams, with each fireteam led by a Party member or a Party candidate. Group meetings were frequently used to maintain unit cohesion, and within the meetings public shamings and criticisms were conducted to raise morale and to indoctrinate soldiers.

The by-product of the tight political control within the PVA is that it relied on the presence of the Party members within its ranks to be combat effective. A PVA unit could disintegrate once the Party members were either killed or wounded in action. Also, the tight political control created a general dissatisfaction amongst the Chinese ranks. Constant political indoctrination and high peer pressure were required to maintain high morale for each soldier.

According to The Korean War, written by Matthew Bunker Ridgway, the commander-in-chief of the UN forces, the positive evaluation of the Chinese Army's good treatment of prisoners is completely different from the KPA's policy of abusing prisoners. He positively praised the Chinese army as a disciplined army and a respectable enemy. During the Korean War, the US front-line combat forces also spoke highly of the fighting will of the PVA.

== Prisoners-of-war (POWs) ==
Prisoners-of-war (POWs) played a major role in the continuation of the war past 1951. The US accused China of implementing mind control, coined "brainwashing", on US prisoners, while China refused to allow the US to repatriate POWs to Taiwan.

=== United Nations POWs ===
In contrast with their KPA counterparts, executions committed by the PVA were rather few in number. According to author Kevin Mahoney in his study of the PVA, executions of POWs did occur during the heat of the battle. Most of the executions appeared to have been committed by the lower commands without the upper echelons' knowledge, and it is often carried out to prevent the future escapes or rescues of the POWs.

As the PVA rarely executed prisoners, the Chinese considered themselves to be more lenient and humane than the KPA. However, the Chinese were unprepared for the large influx of POWs after their entry into the war and a large number of prisoners were crowded into temporary camps for processing. Mass starvation and diseases soon swept through those camps during the winter of 1950–51, while numerous death marches were conducted by the PVA to move the prisoners into permanent locations. Although the situation started to improve after permanent camps were established by January 1951, death by starvation still continued until April 1951. About 43 percent of all US POWs died from November 1950 to April 1951. In comparison, only 34 percent of all US prisoners died under Japanese captivity during World War II. The Chinese have defended their actions by stating that all PVA soldiers during this period were also suffering mass starvation and diseases due to the lack of a competent logistics system. The UN POWs, however, pointed out that a lot of the Chinese camps were located near the Sino-Korean border, and claimed that the starvation was used to force the prisoners to accept the communist indoctrination programs. The starvation and the POW deaths finally stopped by the summer of 1951 after the armistice talks started.

==== Allegations of mind control ====
During the Korean War, Edward Hunter, who worked at the time both as a journalist and as a U.S. intelligence agent, wrote a series of books and articles on the allegations of Chinese mind control, which he coined as "brainwashing".

The Chinese term 洗腦 (xǐnǎo, literally "wash brain") was originally used to describe methodologies of coercive persuasion used under the Maoist regime in China, which aimed to transform individuals with a reactionary imperialist mindset into "right-thinking" members of the new Chinese social system. To that end the regime developed techniques that would break down the psyche integrity of the individual with regard to information processing, information retained in the mind and individual values. Chosen techniques included dehumanizing of individuals by keeping them in filth, sleep deprivation, partial sensory deprivation, psychological harassment, inculcation of guilt and group social pressure. The term punned on the Taoist custom of "cleansing/washing the heart" (洗心, xǐ xīn) prior to conducting certain ceremonies or entering certain holy places.

Hunter and those who picked up the Chinese term used it to explain why, unlike in earlier wars, a relatively high percentage of American GIs defected to the enemy side after becoming prisoners-of-war. It was believed that the Chinese in North Korea used such techniques to disrupt the ability of captured troops to effectively organize and resist their imprisonment. British radio operator Robert W. Ford and British army Colonel James Carne also claimed that the Chinese subjected them to brainwashing techniques during their war-era imprisonment.

After the war, two studies of the repatriation of American prisoners of war by Robert Lifton and by Edgar Schein concluded that brainwashing (called "thought reform" by Lifton and "coercive persuasion" by Schein) had a transient effect. Both researchers found that the Chinese mainly used coercive persuasion to disrupt the ability of the prisoners to organize and maintain morale and hence to escape. By placing the prisoners under conditions of physical and social deprivation and disruption, and then by offering them more comfortable situations such as better sleeping quarters, better food, warmer clothes or blankets, the Chinese did succeed in getting some of the prisoners to make anti-American statements. Nevertheless, the majority of prisoners did not actually adopt Communist beliefs, instead behaving as though they did in order to avoid the plausible threat of extreme physical abuse. Both researchers also concluded that such coercive persuasion succeeded only on a minority of POWs, and that the end-result of such coercion remained very unstable, as most of the individuals reverted to their previous condition soon after they left the coercive environment. In 1961, they both published books expanding on these findings. Schein published Coercive Persuasion, and Lifton published Thought Reform and the Psychology of Totalism. More recent writers including Mikhail Heller have suggested that Lifton's model of brainwashing may throw light on the use of mass propaganda in other communist states such as the former Soviet Union.

In a summary published in 1963, Edgar Schein gave a background history of the precursor origins of the brainwashing phenomenon:

Thought reform contains elements which are evident in Chinese culture (emphasis on interpersonal sensitivity, learning by rote and self-cultivation); in methods of extracting confessions well known in the Papal Inquisition (13th century) and elaborated through the centuries, especially by the Russian secret police; in methods of organizing corrective prisons, mental hospitals and other institutions for producing value change; in methods used by religious sects, fraternal orders, political elites or primitive societies for converting or initiating new members. Thought reform techniques are consistent with psychological principles but were not explicitly derived from such principles.

Mind-control theories from the Korean War era came under criticism in subsequent years. According to forensic psychologist Dick Anthony, the CIA invented the concept of "brainwashing" as a propaganda strategy to undercut communist claims that American POWs in Korean communist camps had voluntarily expressed sympathy for communism. Anthony stated that definitive research demonstrated that fear and duress, not brainwashing, caused western POWs to collaborate. He argued that the books of Hunter (whom he identified as a secret CIA "psychological warfare specialist" passing as a journalist) pushed the CIA brainwashing theory onto the general public.

In addition, Herbert Brownell Jr., the Attorney General of the United States, once said publicly that "if American prisoners of war cooperate with the Communist Party during their imprisonment in North Korea, they will face charges of treason that may carry the death penalty. Moreover, the United States official wrote a statement saying: "Those who cooperate with Communists and sign false confessions should be quickly removed from the army, not honored." In addition to threats and pressure by the U.S. government and military, prisoners of war also face great psychological pressure from the impact on their families. This may explain why many American prisoners of war accused "China of abusing prisoners of war" or why they recanted statements in favor of the People's Republic of China after returning home.

=== Chinese POWs ===
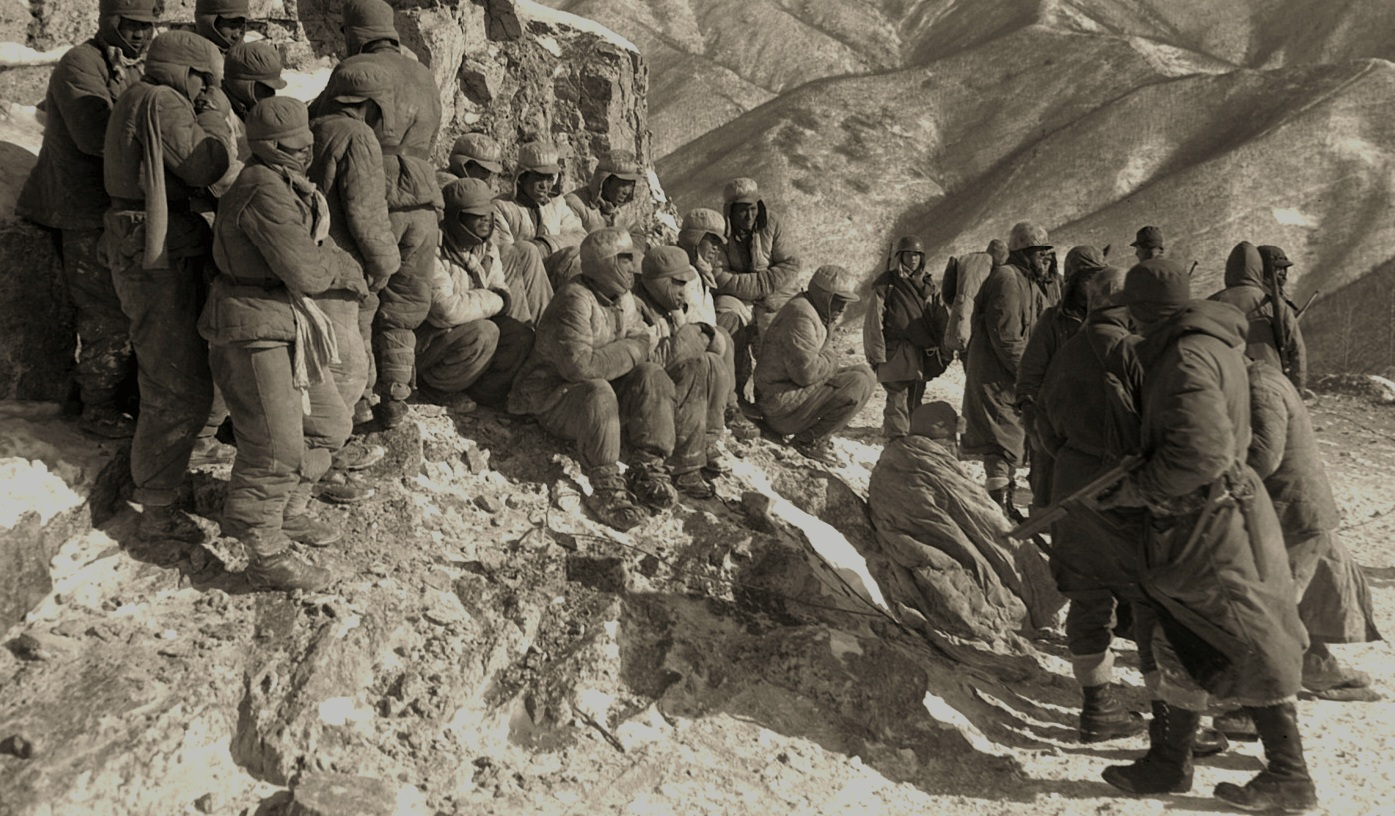
Chinese POWs captured by US Marines, December 1950

==== Anti-communist POWs in communist service ====
During the Panmunjom Truce negotiations, the chief stumbling block to the arrangement of a final armistice during the winter of 1951–1952 revolved around the exchange of prisoners. At first glance, there appeared to be nothing to argue about, since the Geneva Conventions of 1949, by which both sides had pledged to abide, called for the immediate and complete exchange of all prisoners upon the conclusion of hostilities. This seemingly straightforward principle, however, disturbed many Americans. To begin with, UN prisoner-of-war camps held over 40,000 Koreans, many of whom had been impressed into communist service and who had no desire to be sent north upon the conclusion of the war. Moreover, a considerable number of North Korean and Chinese prisoners had also expressed a desire not to return to their homelands. This was particularly true of the Chinese POWs, some of whom were anti-communists whom the communists had forcibly inducted during the Chinese Civil War into the PLA unit that was later transferred into Korea.

== Aftermath of the Korean War ==
In 2011, some former members of the PVA revisited North Korea. After the visit, they commented that they were "very sad" and dissatisfied with the post-war development of North Korea. "[We] liberated them, but they're still struggling for freedom" said Qu Yingkui.

To mark the 70th year of entry into the Korean War by the volunteers' army, North Korean leader Kim Jong-un visited the cemetery in 2020. The Pyongyang Times described the soldiers as having 'unparalleled bravery, mass spirit and international heroism,' and describing the other help that the volunteer army provided. China held a conference in October 2020 to commemorate the 70th anniversary of the entry of the volunteers' army.

== Legacy ==
=== Democratic People's Republic of Korea ===
The legacy of the PVA is commemorated in the DPRK with the Cemetery of the Fallen Soldiers of the Chinese People's Volunteers Army, located in Hoechang County. Wreaths and floral baskets are sent to commemorate their contributions to the war.

=== People's Republic of China ===
For many Chinese, the Korean War is generally regarded as an honorable struggle in Chinese history. The PVA was the first Chinese army in a century that was able to withstand a Western army in a major conflict. They had earned a name "the most beloved people (最可爱的人)", which is from the essay written by Wei Wei in 1951, "Who are the Most Beloved People?". More and more stories of heroism by members of the PVA continue to be promoted by the PRC government even to this day, and appear in school textbooks. The willingness of China to assist North Korea against the United States, and the show of force they engaged in, heralded that China was once again becoming a major world power.

From official Chinese sources, PVA casualties during the Korean War were 390,000. This breaks down as follows: 110,400 KIA; 21,600 died of wounds; 13,000 died of sickness; 25,600 MIA/POW; and 260,000 more wounded. However, western and other sources estimate that about 400,000 Chinese soldiers were either killed in action or died of disease, starvation, exposure, and accidents with around 486,000 wounded, out of around 3 million military personnel deployed in the war by China. Mao Zedong's oldest and only healthy son, Mao Anying (毛岸英), was a PVA officer during the war, and was killed by a UN air strike.

The war also contributed to the decline of Sino-Soviet relations. Although Chinese had their own reasons to enter the war (i.e., a strategic buffer state in the Korean peninsula), the view that the Soviets had used them as proxies was shared in the Western bloc. China had to use Soviet loans originally intended to rebuild their shattered economy to pay for Soviet arms.

=== Republic of China ===
After the war was over, 14,235 of the PVA POWs held by UNC forces were transported to Taiwan. They began arriving in Taiwan on January 23, 1954, and were referred to as "Anti-Communist Heroes" (反共義士). In Taiwan January 23 became World Freedom Day (自由日) in their honor.

The Korean War also led to other long-lasting effects. Until the war, the US had largely abandoned the government of Chiang Kai-shek, which had retreated to Taiwan, and had no plans to intervene in the Chinese Civil War. The start of the Korean War rendered untenable any policy that would have caused Taiwan to fall under PRC control. Truman's decision to send American forces to the Taiwan Strait further deterred the PRC from making any cross-strait invasion of Taiwan. The anti-communist atmosphere in the West in response to the Korean War and Cold War contributed to the unwillingness to diplomatically recognize the People's Republic of China by the United States until 1979. Today, diplomacy between the Republic of China and mainland China remains strained, and mainland China continues to claim the sovereignty of Taiwan.

== Media ==
Who are the Most Beloved People? (Chinese: 《谁是最可爱的人？》) is the title of an essay by Chinese writer Wei Wei about the Chinese soldiers serving in the Korean War. It is considered to be the most famous literary piece produced by China during the Korean War.

Battle on Shangganling Mountain (Chinese: 上甘岭; pinyin: Shanggan Ling) is a famous Chinese war movie about the Battle of Triangle Hill. The story is centered around a group of Chinese soldiers that were trapped in a tunnel for several days. Short of both food and water, they hold their grounds till the relief troops arrive. The movie's popularity is largely due to the fact it was one of the few movies that were not banned during the Cultural Revolution.

War Trash is a novel by the Chinese author Ha Jin, who has long lived in the United States and who writes in English. It takes the form of a memoir written by the fictional character Yu Yuan, a man who eventually becomes a soldier in the Chinese People's Volunteer Army and who is sent to Korea to fight on the Communist side in the Korean War. The majority of the "memoir" is devoted to describing this experience, especially after Yu Yuan is captured and imprisoned as a POW. The novel captured the PEN/Faulkner Award and was a finalist for the Pulitzer Prize.

The Battle at Lake Changjin (2021) and The Battle at Lake Changjin II were big-budget Chinese films depicting PVA heroism during the 1950 Battle of Chosin Reservoir.

== See also ==
- Cold War
- People's Liberation Army
- Korean War
- Soviet Union in the Korean War
