= Lee Seung-hyo =

South Korean actor (born 1980)

Lee Seung Hyo
- Born: May 5, 1980 (age 45); Chungju, South Korea
- Education: Chungju National University - B.A. Chung-Ang University Graduate School of Arts – M.A. in Performance & Visual Media
- Occupation: Actor
- Years active: 2006–present
- Spouse: Jung Tae-ri (m. 2022)

Korean name
- Hangul: 이승효
- Hanja: 李承洨
- RR: I Seunghyo
- MR: I Sŭnghyo

Lee Seung Hyo (Korean: 이승효; born 5 May 1980) is a South Korean actor. He debuted in 2006. He rose to fame as Kim Alcheon in Queen Seondeok.

== Biography ==
He was a sniper in his military service in the Joint Security Area (JSA) from December 2000 to February 2003. He graduated from Chungju National University and is attending Chung-Ang University Graduate School of Arts, majoring in Performance & Visual Media.

== Personal life ==
On February 12, 2022, Lee confirmed that he will get married in Seoul on March 1, 2022. His fiancé is Jung Hye-ri, the younger sister of actor Jung Tae-woo, who is 4 years younger than him.

== Filmography ==
=== Television dramas ===
- Rookie Historian Goo Hae-ryung (MBC, 2019)
- Six Flying Dragons (SBS, 2015)
- Full House Take 2 (TBS/SBS Plus, 2012)
- God of War (MBC, 2012)
- Indomitable Daughters-in-Law (MBC, 2011)
- The Peak (MBC, 2011)
- KBS Drama Special "Hair Show" (KBS2, 2011)
- Legend of the Patriots (KBS, 2010)
- Queen Seondeok (MBC, 2009)
- Two Wives (SBS, 2009)
- Strongest Chil Woo (KBS, 2008)
- Dae Jo-yeong (KBS1, 2007)
- Drama City (KBS2, 2006)

=== Music videos ===
- M To M – "I'm Sorry" [from the single The Soul of Men] (2010)
- "Friends" [from the Legend of the Patriots OST] (2010)

== Awards ==
- 2011 Asia Jewelry Awards - Ruby Award
- 2009 MBC Drama Awards - Best New Actor (Queen Seondeok)
