= Full House Take 2 =

2012 South Korean-Japanese TV series

- Promotional poster
- Written by: Park Young-sook
- Directed by: Kim Jin-young; Nam Ki-hoon
- Starring: Hwang Jung-eum; No Min-woo; Park Ki-woong
- Composer: Oh Joon-sung (DRM Media)
- Country of origin: South Korea
- Original language: Korean
- No. of episodes: 20 (Japan); 32 (South Korea)

Production
- Executive producer: Kim Yong-jin
- Producers: TBS Channel 2; SBS Plus
- Production location: Korea
- Running time: 30 minutes per part; Friday at 20:00 (JST); Monday to Thursday at 24:30 (KST)
- Production companies: Kim Jong-hak Production; Digital Khan

Original release
- Network: TBS Channel 2; SBS Plus
- Release: 22 October – 13 December 2012

Related
- Full House

Full House Take 2 is a 2012 South Korean television series that was jointly produced by Korean and Japanese companies. It aired on Japan's TBS-cable affiliate TBS Channel 2, and South Korean cable channel SBS Plus.

== Plot ==
A hapkido teacher named Jang Man-ok (Hwang Jung-eum; Man-ok means "full house" in Hanja) poses as a stylist for top idol group Take One and moves into the band's luxurious house, which superstar musician Lee Tae-ik (No Min-woo) inherited from his father. A love triangle emerges as Lee vies against fellow band member Won Kang-hwi (Park Ki-woong) for Jang's affection.

== Cast ==
=== Main characters ===
- Hwang Jung-eum as Jang Man-ok/Michelle Jang
  - Roh Jeong-eui as young Man-ok
- No Min-woo as Lee Tae-ik
  - Oh Jae-moo as teenage Tae-ik
  - Ahn Do-gyu as young Tae-ik
- Park Ki-woong as Won Kang-hwi
  - Jung Yoon-seok as young Kang-hwi
- Yoo Seol-ah as Jin Se-ryung

=== Supporting characters ===
- Kim Byung-se as Hwang Bum-soo
- Lee Seung-hyo as Bae Go-dong
- Lee Hoon as Lee Joon
- Jang Hang-sun as Man-ok's grandfather
- Yang Han-yeol as Mon-ok's student
- Han Yeo-wool as secretary
- Kim Do-yeon as Han Ga-ryun
- Yoo Tae-woong
- Song Min-hyung
- Oh Na-mi as stylist Choi
- Jung Ji-ah
- Lee Shin-ae
- Heo Jae-ho
- Zi Liu
- Kang Doo as Sangsudong Wolf / Sang Dae

=== Guests ===
- Jo Jae-yoon as Korean-Chinese taxi driver.
