= Jang Hang-sun =

South Korean actor

- Born: Kim Bong-soo; February 22, 1947 (age 79); Yesan-gun, Chungcheongnam-do, South Korea
- Occupation: Actor

Korean name
- Hangul: 김봉수
- RR: Gim Bongsu
- MR: Kim Pongsu

Stage name
- Hangul: 장항선
- Hanja: 張項線; 長項線
- RR: Jang Hangseon
- MR: Chang Hangsŏn

Jang Hang-sun (born Kim Bong-soo, February 22, 1947) is a South Korean actor.

== Filmography ==
=== Film ===
Year	Title	Role
1993	I Will Survive	
1998	Birdcage Inn	Father
1999	Tell Me Something	Detective Oh
2000	The Foul King	Jang Gwan-jang
2000	The Isle	Middle-aged man (cameo)
2001	This is Law	
2002	My Beautiful Girl, Mari	Jun-ho's father
2003	Oh! Happy Day	Kong Jang-geun
2003	Happy Ero Christmas	Ero chairman
2004	The Wolf Returns	Manager Lee
2004	Superstar Mr. Gam	
2004	Ghost House	Jang Kil-bok
2005	Never to Lose	Yuk Chul-gu
2005	King and the Clown	Cheo-sun
2006	Lost in Love	Uncle
2007	Big Bang	Shim Pyung-seob
2007	For Eternal Hearts	(cameo)
2007	Seven Days	Sa Moo-jang
2008	The Devil's Game	Park Chang-ha
2009	Chaw	Chun Il-man
2011	Hanji	Monk Doam
2011	Mama	Deok-soo
2018	Sunset in My Hometown	Hak-soo's father

=== Television series ===
Year	Title	Role
1975	Junwoo	
1991	Eyes of Dawn	OOE Oh Jang
1994	The Last Match	Yoon Chul-jun's father
1994	Han Myung-hoi	Hong Dal-son
1995	Sandglass	
1995	A Sunny Place of the Young	
1996	Tears of the Dragon	Jo Young-moo
2000	Wang Rung's Land	Yi-soo
2000	Emperor Wang Gun	Wang Pyul-dal
2000	The Golden Era	
2001	Pretty Woman	Han Man-shik
2001	Guardian Angel	Ha Deok-ho
2002	Winter Sonata	Supervisor Min
2002	Sunshine Hunting	Shim Dal-keun
2002	Daemang (The Great Ambition)	Byun Heang-su
2003	KBS TV Novel: Buni	Bae Il-joon
2003	Scent of a Man	Kwon Hyuk-soo's father
2003	Rosemary	Shin In-sik
2005	Pharmacist Kim's Daughters	Jung Kuk-joo
2005	Three-Leaf Clover	Lee Jung-man
2006	Seoul 1945	Kim Pan-chul
2006	Yeon Gaesomun	
2006	Lovers	
2007	The Legend	Heukgae
2008	Fight	Kang Kwan-jang
2009	The Slingshot	President Chae
2010	Jejungwon	"Yard Dog"
2010	Bread, Love and Dreams	Pal-bong
2010	Grudge: The Revolt of Gumiho	Monk
2010	I Am Legend	Go Jin-bae
2011	Detectives in Trouble	Kwon Young-sool
2011	Padam Padam	Detective Jung
2011	Bachelor's Vegetable Store	Jung Goo-gwang
2012	Full House Take 2	Jang Man-ok's grandfather
2014	Big Man	Jo Hwa-soo
2014	Pride and Prejudice	Yoo Dae-gi

== Awards and nominations ==
Year	Award	Category	Nominated work	Result
2006	14th Chunsa Film Art Awards	Best Supporting Actor	The King and the Clown	Won
2006	43rd Grand Bell Awards	Best Supporting Actor	Never to Lose	Nominated
2010	KBS Drama Awards	Best Supporting Actor	Bread, Love and Dreams	Nominated
