= Legend of the Patriots =

South Korean television series

- Promotional poster
- Also known as: Comrades
- Hangul: 전우
- Hanja: 戰友
- RR: Jeonu
- MR: Chŏnu
- Written by: Lee Eun-sang; Kim Pil-jin
- Directed by: Kim Sang-hwi; Song Hyun-wook
- Music by: Kim Jong-cheon
- Country of origin: South Korea
- Original language: Korean
- No. of episodes: 20

Production
- Running time: Saturdays & Sundays at 20:55 (KST)

Original release
- Network: KBS2
- Release: 19 June – 22 August 2010

Legend of the Patriots (Korean: 전우; RR: Jeonu) is a remake of the 1975 South Korean drama Comrades. Its production was spawned to commemorate the 60th anniversary of the Korean War. The story centers around the lives of eleven South Korean soldiers fighting in the Korean War. Director Kim Sang-hwi remarked that the series is not about the ideologies of South and North Korea, but rather focuses on the struggles of ordinary people who lived through the war.

== Cast ==
- Choi Soo-jong (최수종) as Lee Hyeon-joong (이현중)
- Lee Tae-ran (이태란) as Lee Soo-kyung (이수경)
- Lee Deok-hwa (이덕화) as Park Woong (박웅)
- Kim Roi-ha (김뢰하) as Park Il-kwon (박일권)
- Hong Kyeong-in (홍경인) as Yang Sang-gil (양상길)
- Park Sang-wook (박상욱) as Baek Seung-jin (백승진)
- Nam Sung-jin (남성진) as Yeom Ha-jin (염하진)
- Im Won-hee (임원희) as Kim Joon-beom (김준범)
- Lee Seung-hyo (이승효) as Jung Taek-soo(정택수)
- Ryoo Sang-wook (류상욱) as Park Joo-yong (박주용)
- Ahn Yong-joon (안용준) as Kim Beom-woo (김범우)
- Jung Tae-woo (정태우) as Cheon Seong-il (천성일)
- Lee In-hye (이인혜) as Jeong-hwa (정화)
- Jo Seong-gyoo (조성규) as Battalion commander (대대장)
- Lee Joo-seok (이주석) as Kim Joong-san (김중산)
- Lee Chae-young (이채영) as Dan-yeong (단영)
- Kim Seong-hoon (김성훈) as Poongsan guerrilla member (풍산유격대)
- Hong Seung-min (홍승민)

== Synopsis ==
The series begins with the ROK Army crossing of the 38th parallel while UN planes begin bombing Pyongyang, the capital of North Korea. The Korean People's Army (KPA) begins a fighting withdrawal from the city. Sergeant First Class Lee Hyun-joong (Choi Soo-jong) leads his squad forward into the city and not long afterwards the Republic of Korea Army (ROKA) captures the capital. Major General Yong Park (Lee Deok-hwa) is elated by his Division's involvement in capturing the Communist stronghold.

Meanwhile, KPA Lieutenant Lee Soo-kyung (Lee Tae-ran) and Sergeant Cheon Yong-taek (Kim Myeong Su) escape with retreating elements of the shattered People's Army and regroup with a growing deployment of Chinese People's Liberation Army (PLA) troops. Lieutenant Lee is shown to once have a relationship with Sergeant Lee Hyun-joong, but the two went their separate ways due to differences in ideology.

Sgt. Lee's 1st squad, Eagle Company, is resting in a home billeted for their use when they receive word of a massive PLA invasion force headed their way. Despite building trench fortifications and bravely fighting the waves of PLA and KPA troops they are forced to retreat due to lack of supplies and ammunition. Soon, the whole ROK Army is in retreat (and off-screen, their UN allies with them) as the Chinese PLA juggernaut overwhelms them.

The series progresses with sub-plots that involve a rescue of General Park who is captured by deserting ROK soldier, Cheon Song-il (Jung Tae-woo). Sgt. Lee and (newly promoted) Cpt. Lee see each other and it is obvious feelings still exist despite their being on opposite sides of the conflict. Song-il is incorporated into KPA ranks. He is quickly pitied upon by Sgt. Yong-taek who takes the young frightened soldier under his wing. Sgt. Lee's squad eventually meet some anti-communist guerrillas who rescue them from PLA patrols and they recuperate at the guerrilla hideout, meeting the feisty daughter-in-law of the guerrilla commander, Jung-hwa (Lee In-hye). Sgt. Lee's 1st squad enlist the support of the guerrillas in liberating General Park, and the tired, worn soldiers of the 1st squad finally are able to return to base.

Cpt. Lee is chastised for allowing General Park to escape and is demoted back to Lieutenant. Sgt. Yong-taek's humanity begins to show as he continues to look after Song-il and maintaining a chivalrousness attitude even towards his enemies. This is in direct contrast to his subordinate, Comrade Sgt. Woncheol, who beats Song-il for cowardliness and is openly suspicious of Lt. Lee's alleged collusion with the enemy. Woncheol's hatred is apparently driven by the fact his two brothers were killed by ROK soldiers. Their Special-Ops unit is soon assigned to shoot PLA and KPA deserters which takes a toll on Song-il who becomes even more disgusted with war.

General Park is forced to send the boys who rescued him back behind enemy lines. It is revealed that the encampment in which he was imprisoned for a short while was a series of caves which contained a vital base of supplies for the communist armies. Since they had traversed that terrain only recently, Sgt. Lee's squad knew the territory. They are ordered to escort a ROK Marine unit in charge of sabotaging the supply base, however Pvt. Yang Sanggil (Hong Kyoung In) goes AWOL to find his mother who lives in a village on the way to their destination. The squad is delayed by a fire-fight with roaming KPA patrols and they miss the rendezvous with the Marine squad. Because of this, the Marines land by themselves and are cut down by KPA coastal defenders except for Pvt. Choi Dan-Young (Lee Chae-young), an uncompromising yet beautiful female Marine who goes into hiding but only after watching her sister and fellow-Marine die.

As a consequence, Sgt. Lee's squad is arrested for insubordination and rounded up to be shot. Only the timely intervention of General Park commutes their sentences to carrying out the sabotage mission themselves. They were to consider themselves dead until they were able to destroy the supply depot. Again infiltrating into enemy territory they again enlist the help of Jung-hwa and her gang but most of the guerrillas are killed and their base destroyed after Comrade Woncheol employs ruthless tactics. Cheon Song-il is separated from his KPA comrades as he hides from his former squad mates that find him anyway and are disgusted to find him in a KPA uniform. But his life is spared because he helped the guerrilla's children hide from the KPA. Eventually Sgt. Lee and Pvt. Choi are captured, but escape and complete their destruction of the Supply depot. In the melee Pvt. Choi Dan-young is shot and killed by Lt. Lee, but Choi is able to ignite the explosion that destroys the depot. Lt. Lee is caught in the explosion, while Sgt. Lee can only watch in horror. Lt. Lee survives, however, thanks to the concern of Comrade Yong-taek and Song-il (who is back with the KPA after being exchanged for Pvt. Yang Sanggil who was captured while trying to unsuccessfully ignite the explosion the first time).

The squad and Sgt. Lee are separated and the squad is captured by the North Koreans who send them to a concentration camp. The camp is run by a female state agent, Yoon Jeongin, who manipulates the prisoners to turn on themselves for her entertainment. Sgt. Lee has already given himself up, eager to join his men in confinement to help them devise a way to escape. Sgt. Lee's second-in-command, Sgt. Park Il-Kwon (Kim Roi-ha), is set up to lead the prisoners, and is forced to betray some of the prisoners attempting escape. This earns the contempt of the 1st squad's men, while Lee is less convinced that Park was working in self-interest. The camp director and the state agent in-charge have set up brutal boxing matches to entertain themselves and the men. Meanwhile, Pvt. Park Joo-yong (Ryu Sang Wook), 1st squad's medic is found to be useful by the KPA and is forced to serve in the KPA 2nd Division, 17th Reg. as their medic. He meets Sgts Park and Lee and bids them farewell. The only non-captured 1st squad members Pvts. Kim Beom-woo (Ahn Yong Joon) and Jung Taeksu (Lee Seung-hyo) look for a way to break out their squadmates. Agent Yoon tries to manipulate Sgt. Lee to defect to the North and the good Sergeant feigns defection, but is secretly only concerned about breaking his men out and returning safely to friendly lines. Sgt. Lee reminds Agent Yoon, "War is not just a game where you slaughter all your enemies, it is the struggle to remain human even while holding a gun in your hand". Along with a mottle of UN POWs, the ROK soldiers devise a plan to escape. The imprisoned KPA deserters are promised freedom if they kill Sgt. Lee's 1st squad, but they end up helping the POWs and the prisoners break out, killing the KPA guards in the process.

The POWs go their separate ways and the 1st squad members board a truck and find their way back to HQ, but not before Lt. Lee Soo-kyung, now leading a sniper squad, shoots Pvt. Jung Taeksu and severs his spine, paralyzing him from waist down. Adding insult to injury, the entire 1st squad (with the exception of Pvt. Jung, now incapacitated, and Pvt. Park, who joined the KPA as a medic) is taken and interrogated by ROK intelligence for possible collusion with the communists. Like most interrogation tactics our heroes are not given any breathing room and under threat that his squad would be executed if he did not confess, Sgt. Lee decides to falsely admit to turning communist. Again, General Park intervenes and vouches for the men, placing his career and reputation on the line. The men are released and promoted.

1st squad is again fighting for Eagle company and their platoon (2nd pltn) is assigned to hold a bridge at all costs. As chance would have it, Lt. Lee's KPA battalion is assigned to capture it. Comrade Sgt. Yong-taek and Pvt. Song-il are among the North Korean troops sent to the bridge. Sgt. Woncheol is also among them. Another showdown between the two opposing units begins as Lt. Lee kills Sgt. Park and the rest of the 2nd Platoon's recon squad. Sgt. Yong-taek's men attempt to take the bridge and are cut down. Both sides exchange fire until they are out of ammunition. Pvt. Beom-woo is captured and the unfortunate teenage soldier is placed in the hands of Sgt. Woncheol who is notified that his last remaining brother was KIA. A vengeful and now psychotic Woncheol takes Beom-woo to the bridge and despite Comrade Yong-taek's repeated pleas and orders to desist, kills Beom-woo in front of a disbelieving 1st squad. Without ammo they could not intervene. The Platoon's Lieutenant, Kim Jong-San, engages Woncheol in hand-to-hand combat and kills him. The two sides then clash in hand-to-hand combat until Cheon Song-il, tired of all the bloodshed threatens to shoot anyone on either side who continues fighting. At that moment, ROKA reinforcements from Eagle company arrive and the North Koreans disperse. Meanwhile, Pvt. Park, now working as a medic for the KPA, refuses to leave ROKA wounded untreated. He is shot by a wounded ROKA soldier whom he treats before he succumbs to his own wounds, dying in a Korean People's Army uniform.

1st squad is sent back to resupply. Comrade Yong-taek allows Song-il to run away. A North Korean General surrenders and Eagle Company soldiers are assigned to escort him to the rear of the ROKA lines. Lt. Lee takes a member of her squad and together they kill the surrendering KPA General and in the process kill Sgt. Baek (Park Sang Uk), another member of 1st squad. As Sgt. Baek dies in Sgt. Lee's arms, he tells him that "that woman" shot him, a reference to Lt. Lee Soo-kyung. Cheon Song-il is later captured by the ROKA and is detained in the charge of deserting his post. Declining General Park's offer for him to return to fight, he attempts to walk away. Military Police arrest him and send him with other deserters to be executed. 1st squad is assigned to do the execution and they immediately recognize Song-il. Sgt. Lee regretfully fulfills his duty and shoots to make the quickest death possible. Sergeant Lee Hyung-joon then embraces the lifeless Song-il and weeps bitterly.

2nd Platoon is assigned to root out snipers and now the remaining members of the original 1st squad are now dispersed to lead the different squads of the platoon. Lt. Lee's squad of snipers would not go down easily, however, and one-by-one the remaining men of the original 1st squad fall prey to the lethal Mosin-Nagant sniper rifles. The snipers are cornered, however, and are killed. Sgt. Lee catches up to his lover one last time. Wounded, she begs him to kill her as she would not tolerate being captured by the South Koreans. He hesitates, but she helps him by lifting her rifle in an attempt to shoot more of his men. Sgt. Lee ends her life, and weeping, he brings her body with him to ROKA lines. At first he is denied permission to cremate her among the ROK fallen, but eventually is allowed.

1st Sgt. Lee is promoted to Master Sergeant and awarded the ROK's highest medal. The rest of the squad (along with the slain Marines) receive the same posthumously. Sgt. Lee returns amid the new recruits of Eagle company, marching to the front, undoubtedly to fight in the stalemate along the 38th parallel until the armistice that halted combat operations. The series end here with no word on the fate of Sgt. Lee.

== Production ==
- Screenwriters: Lee Eun-sang and Kim Pil-jin
- Directors: Kim Sang-hwi and Song Hyeon-wook

== See also ==
- Contemporary culture of South Korea
- History of Korea
- Korean War in popular culture
