= Junwoo =

South Korean television series

- Also known as: Comrades
- Genre: War, Drama
- Written by: Lee Sang-hyeon; Kim Dong-hyeon
- Directed by: Jang Hyeong-il; Ju Dae-seong
- Starring: Ra Si-chan; Jang Hang-sun; Heo Young
- Country of origin: South Korea
- Original language: Korean

Production
- Production location: South Korea
- Running time: 50 minutes Saturdays and Sundays (KST)

Original release
- Network: Korean Broadcasting System
- Release: 28 June 1975 – 8 April 1978

Junwoo (Korean: 전우; Hanja: 戰友; RR: Jeonu; lit. 'Comrades') is a South Korean television series about the Korean War that was broadcast on KBS from 1975 to 1978. Its first remake aired from 1983 to 1984. Its second remake, Legend of the Patriots, aired in 2010.

== Cast ==
- Ra Si-chan
- Jang Hang-sun
- Heo Young
- Kim Sang-hoon
- Park Hae-sang
- Yoon Deok-yong
- Cheon Jung-woo
- Seo Sang-ik
- Lee Hyun-doo
- Ahn Kwang-jin
- Song Jae-ho
- Maeng Ho-rim

== 1983 remake ==
=== Cast ===
- Kang Min-ho
- Kim Si-won
- Jang Chil-gun
- Lee Mun-hwan
- Kim Yoon-hyeong
- Park Hae-sang
- Kim Cheon-man

=== Director ===
- Jung Young-cheol

== Ratings ==
In this table, the blue numbers represent the lowest ratings and the red numbers represent the highest ratings.

회차	Original broadcast date	TNmS Ratings		AGB Ratings	
회차	Original broadcast date	Nationwide	Seoul	Nationwide	Seoul
1	June 19, 2010	16.7%	16.4%	16.1%	16.1%
2	June 20, 2010	16.9%	16.1%	15.6%	15.0%
3	June 26, 2010	17.0%	15.8%	17.4%	16.9%
4	June 27, 2010	15.1%	14.0%	14.8%	14.2%
5	July 3, 2010	12.7%	12.1%	12.9%	12.1%
6	July 4, 2010	14.4%	14.0%	13.4%	12.9%
7	July 10, 2010	13.2%	13.1%	12.0%	10.5%
8	July 11, 2010	15.0%	14.3%	14.2%	12.8%
9	July 17, 2010	13.9%	13.6%	13.1%	11.5%
10	July 18, 2010	15.4%	15.6%	13.6%	12.7%
11	July 24, 2010	14.3%	13.2%	13.8%	12.7%
12	July 25, 2010	15.1%	13.8%	14.2%	13.3%
13	July 31, 2010	13.2%	12.6%	12.1%	12.0%
14	August 1, 2010	14.3%	13.9%	14.0%	13.7%
15	August 7, 2010	14.5%	14.2%	13.9%	13.4%
16	August 8, 2010	16.1%	15.1%	16.2%	15.6%
17	August 14, 2010	15.6%	14.7%	14.0%	13.2%
18	August 15, 2010	17.9%	17.2%	16.8%	15.5%
19	August 21, 2010	14.3%	14.0%	12.4%	11.0%
20	August 22, 2010	16.2%	16.0%	14.4%	13.4%
Average		15.1%	14.5%	14.3%	13.4%
