= Jung Tae-woo =

South Korean actor

- Born: Jung Tae-woo; March 23, 1982 (age 44); South Korea
- Occupation: Actor
- Spouse: Jang In-hee (m. 2009)
- Children: 2
- Awards: Best Supporting Actor; 2002 Taejo Wang Geon at 2001 KBS Drama Awards

Korean name
- Hangul: 정태우
- Hanja: 鄭泰祐
- RR: Jeong Taeu
- MR: Chŏng T'aeu

Jung Tae-woo (Korean: 정태우; born March 23, 1982) is a South Korean actor. Much of his work has been in the genre of Korean historical dramas such as Taejo Wang Geon, Dae Jo-yeong, and The King and I.

== Career ==
Like many South Korean actors Jung, Tae-woo began his career as a child model/actor. He made his first mark in Korean TV drama at age 19 when he was awarded the 2001 KBS Best Supporting Actor award for his role as a precocious court advisor in the 200-episode historical series Taejo Wang Geon. He has been cast in a variety of supporting roles, from sensitive and tragic in historical drama to comic in such Korean television series as Nonstop, Into the Sun, and Mom's Dead Upset (aka Angry Mom).

In 2007 he appeared in the long-running and popular KBS historical series Dae Jo-yeong playing the hero's illegitimate son Geom. Immediately after, he made a brief but notable appearance in the SBS sageuk drama The King and I" playing the notorious Joseon king Yeonsangun.

His most notable movie role is as the pachinko game promoter Chun-bae in the 2004 martial arts film Fighter in the Wind.

In 2010, Jung portrayed a soldier in a series about the Korean War, Legend of the Patriots.

In January 2013, Jung co-starred in military musical The Promise. It was co-produced by the Ministry of National Defense and Korea Musical Theatre Association, to commemorate the 60th anniversary of the signing of an armistice. It ran from January 9 to 20 at the National Theater of Korea, co-starring actors Ji Hyun-woo, Kim Mu-yeol; as well as singers Leeteuk of Super Junior, Yoon Hak of Supernova, and Lee Hyun of 8Eight. The musical is centered around a group of soldiers who keeps a promise made to each other during the 6.25 war.

== Personal life ==
On May 8, 2009, Jung Tae-woo wed stewardess Jang In-hee in a private Christian ceremony at Seoul's Shilla Hotel. They have two sons, born in 2010 and 2015.

== Filmography ==
=== TV series ===
- The King of Tears, Lee Bang-won (KBS1, 2021–2022)
- My Sibling's Lovers: Family Is Watching (E Channel, 2019)
- King of Mask Singer (MBC, 2018)
- Criminal Minds (tvN, 2017) - Kim Min Soo
- The Merchant: Gaekju 2015 (KBS, 2015)
- The Jingbirok: A Memoir of Imjin War (KBS, 2015)
- Gwanggaeto, The Great Conqueror (KBS, 2011)
- Legend of the Patriots (KBS, 2010)
- Mom's Dead Upset (KBS, 2008)
- The King and I (SBS, 2008) - Prince Yeonsan
- Dae Jo-yeong (KBS, 2007) - Dae Geom
- Police Line (On Media cable, 2007)
- Great Inheritance (KBS, 2006)
- Age of Warriors (KBS, 2003) - Emperor Huijong
- Into the Sun (SBS, 2003) - Kim Jae-hyun
- Nonstop 3 (MBC, 2003)
- King's Woman (SBS, 2003) - Prince Gwanghae's Prince Successor
- Woman of the World (SBS, 2002) - King Injong
- Taejo Wang Geon (KBS, 2000) - Choi Ung
- Nonstop (TV Sitcom, 2000)
- The King and the Queen (KBS, 1998) - King Danjong
- Tears of the Dragon (1996) - Great Prince Muan
- Han Myeong-hoi (KBS, 1994) - King Danjong
- 500 Years of the Joseon Dynasty: The Ume Tree in the Midst of the Snow (MBC, 1984–1985) - King Danjong

=== Films ===
- I'm Here (2023)
- Oh! My Ghost (2022)
- Wedding Campaign (2005)
- Fighter in the Wind (2004)
- Chihwaseon (aka Painted Fire or Strokes of Fire) (2002)
- Kid Cop (1993)

=== Web series ===
- Now, Parliament is 36.5 (2022) as Nam Goong-hoon

=== Television shows ===
- Mr. House Husband 2 (2022–present) - Cast member

=== Theater ===
- 2009/2010 Equus
- 2009 Jazz Lunatic

== Awards ==
- KBS Best Supporting Actor (2001)
- 2022: 2022 KBS Entertainment Awards - Rookie Award in Reality Category (Mr. House Husband 2)
