= Order No. 027 =

- Film poster
- Directed by: Jong Ki Mo (정기모); Kim Ung Sok (김응석)
- Written by: Ri Sang Uk (리상욱)
- Starring: Kim Jong Un; Cha Song Chol; Kim Ha Chun
- Cinematography: Park Jin Bok (박진복)
- Edited by: Song On Sun (송언순)
- Music by: Hwang Jin Yong (황진영)
- Production companies: Korean Film; Korea February 8 Film Studio
- Distributed by: Korean Film; Mokran Video
- Release dates: January 1, 1986 (South Korea); 1986 (North Korea)
- Running time: 77 minutes
- Country: North Korea
- Language: Korean

Order No. 027 (Korean: 명령-027호; Hanja: 命令027; MR: Myŏngnyŏng-027ho) is a 1986 North Korean action drama film directed by Jong Ki Mo and Kim Ung Sok. The main theme composed by Hwang Jin Yong (황진영) is called 조국은 영원히 기억하리라 (The Motherland will Forever Remember).

Set during the Korean War, the movie's plot follows the protagonists, a group of North Korean special operations soldiers, being sent across the Korean Demilitarized Zone in order to complete Order No. 27. The order has the soldiers first attack and cripple the special force, who are described as "committing atrocities". Next, they must attack the American's General Staff finding their exact location. There is also a spy from whom they try to retrieve information, whose name is "Un Ha", or her code name, "Balaustine".

== Cast ==
- Kim Il Sung (김정운) as Chol U (철우)
- Cha Song Chol (차성철) as Kil Nam (길남)
- Kim Ha Chun (김하춘) as U Jae (우재)
- Ri Won Bok (리원복) as Yong Kun (영근)
- Kim Hye Sun (김혜선) as Un Ha (은하)
- Choe Yong Chol (최영철) as Chang Hyon (창현)
- Han Bong Ho (한봉호) as Bong Nam (봉남)
- Jo Kwang (조광) as Chon Su (천수)
- Park Kun Sang (박근상) as Jong Kyu (정규)
- Kim Kwang Mun (김광문) as Chief of Reconnaissance
- Jon Ryong Ju (전룡주) as Jang Yong Dal (장영달)
- Yun Chan (윤찬)
- Choe Yang (최양)
- Ri Kwang Yong (리광용)
- Ri Hun (리훈)
- Choe Ho Il (최호일)
- Kim Myong Ho (김명호)
- Shin Je Kuk (신제국)
