= Who are the Most Beloved People? =

1951 essay by Chinese journalist Wei Wei

Who are the Most Beloved People? (Chinese: 谁是最可爱的人; pinyin: Shéi Shì Zuì Kě'ài De Rén) is the title of a famous essay about the People's Volunteer Army (PVA) in Korea written by Chinese journalist Wei Wei.

== Content ==
The essay revolves around the theme that the Chinese soldiers are the "most beloved people". To illustrate this point, Wei Wei lists three examples of the soldiers' sacrifices. The first example describes the battle between the Chinese 38th Corps and the US 2nd Infantry Division at the Battle of the Ch'ongch'on River and how a company of soldiers sacrificed themselves during combat. The second example shows an artilleryman rescued a child in the aftermath of an air strike and volunteers for rifleman duty in order to avenge the aggressions against the Korean people. The third example records a conversation from a soldier and his selfless commitment towards the liberation of Korea. The essay ends with a reminder that the peace at home is not possible without the sacrifices from the "most beloved people".

== Impacts ==
Described as smooth reading and moving, the essay became instantly popular in China after it was published on April 11, 1951, in the People's Daily newspaper. The essay had also earned praises from the top Chinese leaders. Considered the most famous literary and propaganda piece produced by China during the Korean War, the essay succeed in elevating the soldiers' traditionally low social status within the Confucian culture, and helped to boost the recruitment of soldiers for the Korean War. In the decades following the essay's publication, the phrase "most beloved people" has become synonymous with the PVA and PLA in mainland China, while the essay has become required reading in Chinese school curriculum.
