= Wei Wei (male writer) =

Chinese writer (1920–2008)

- 魏巍
- Born: Wei Hongjie (魏鸿杰); March 6, 1920; Zhengzhou, Henan, China
- Died: August 24, 2008 (aged 88); Beijing, China
- Occupation: Novelist
- Spouse: Liu Qiuhua (刘秋华)
- Writing career
- Pen name: Hongyangshu (红杨树)
- Language: Chinese
- Period: 1951 - 1980s
- Genre: Novel
- Notable work: East
- Notable awards: Mao Dun Literary Prize; 1982 Orient

Wei Wei (Chinese: 魏巍; pinyin: Wèi Wéi; March 6, 1920 – August 24, 2008), originally known as Hong Jie (simplified Chinese: 鸿杰; traditional Chinese: 鴻傑; pinyin: Hóng Jié), was a Chinese poet, a prose writer, a literary report writer, a journalist, a vice-editor-in-chief and the editor of various newspapers in China. His works are noted for their themes of patriotism, communism, and nationalism. Apart from using the name Wei Wei, he once used the pen name Hong Yangshu (紅陽樹) in some of his publications. He changed his name from Hong Jie to Wei Wei in 1937 when he had started a new page of his life, a political one.

== Biography ==
Wei Wei was born into a poor family in Zhengzhou, Henan, and received a rudimentary primary education. He showed early interest in calligraphy and literature, but was unable to receive much education after elementary school, when both of his parents died. He was largely self-taught and was greatly influenced by the radical Chinese literature of the 1920s and 30s, including works by authors like Lu Xun and Mao Dun.

Wei Wei joined the Eighth Route Army at the outbreak of the Second Sino-Japanese War in 1937 and was educated to be a propagandist and journalist. After joining the Chinese Communist Party in 1938, he rose quickly through party ranks. He became known for reporting from the front lines, which continued throughout the Korean War and the Vietnam War. He also became known for composing a series of Communist-themed novels, short stories, and operas.

Wei died on August 24, 2008, in Beijing.

== Works ==
=== Poetry ===
- (蛔蛔，你喊起他們吧) Huihui, You Wake Them Up!
- (好夫妻歌) The Good Couple Song
- (黎明的寄張家口) Evening of Zhangjiakou
- (開上前線) Go to Frontier
- (塞北晚歌)(1945) The Northern Boundary Evening Song
- (三合川)(1945) Sanhechuan
- (好兄弟歌) The Good Brothers Song
- (秋千歌辭) The Autumn Song
- (英雄的防綫) A Hero's Bottom Line
- (兩年)(1951) Two Years
- (黎明的風景) Dawn View
- (不斷集)(1963) Never Ending Collection

=== Prose ===
==== Fiction ====
===== Novels =====
- 《東方》Orient (1978)
- 《 地球的紅飄帶》The Earth's Red Flying Ribbon (1987)
- 《火鳳凰》Fire Phoenix (1997)
- 《我們唾棄那種中國人》We Despise those Kinds of Chinese (1999)
- 《我的朋友:短篇小說集》My Friends (1956)

===== Novellas =====
- 《老煙筒》The Old Chimney (1954)
- 《魏巍散文集》Wei Wei Novella Collection (1982)
- 《魏巍散文選》Wei Wei Novella Collection (Selected) (1991)

===== Short stories =====
- 《長空怒風》Angry Winds of the Sky (published with Bai Ai 白艾/ in 1952).
- 《志願軍叔叔和朝鮮姑娘》Volunteer Soldiers and Korean Girls (1952)

===== Screenplay =====
- 《紅色的風暴》The Red Storm (published with Qian Xiaohui 錢小惠in 1956)

===== Opera =====
- 《打擊侵略者》Conquer the Invaders (with Song Zhidi 宋之的 and Ding Yi 丁毅 in 1952)

===== Anthologies =====
- 《幸福花為勇士而開》The Flowers Are Opened for the Warriors (1956)
- 《壯士行集》Journal of the Strong People (1980)
- 《魏巍雜文集》Collection Book (1985)

==== Non-fiction ====
===== Essays =====
- 《誰是最可愛的人》 Who are the Most Beloved People? (1951)
- 《雁宿涯戰鬥小景》Fighting in the Yansu Cliff (1939)
- 《黃土岭戰鬥日記》Wangtuling Fighting Journal (1939)
- 《依依惜別的心情》We Really Missed It (1949)
- 《故士和祖國》The Earth and My Country
- 《自豪吧祖國》Be Proud, My Country
- 《年輕人, 讓你的青春更美麗》Young People Let Your Youth be more Beautiful (1951)
- 《在漢江南岸的日日夜夜》The Days and Nights of the Southern Shores of Han River (1951)
- 《春天漫笔》Spring Time (1954)
- 《夏日三題》The Summer Three Titles (1954)
- 《祝福走向生活的人們》Blessings Goes to the People (1954)
- 《路標》The Road Sign (1954)
- 《在歡樂的鼓聲中前進》Moving forward in the Happy Sounds of the Drum
- 《在洪流中》In Quick Water
- 《懷念小川》Missing Xiaochuan
- 《新的長征》The New Long March

===== Biographies =====
- 《鄧中夏傳》 Deng Zhongxia Biography (with Qian Xiaohui in 1980)
- 《青年彭德懷》 The Youth of Peng Dehuai (editor Yeng Ruiguang 楊瑞廣, in 1995)

===== Literary reports =====
- 《燕嘎子》 (1944)
- 《平原雷火》 Firings on the Plain (1945)
- 《攻克獨流鎮》 (1945)
- 《前進吧祖國》Move forward, My Country (1952)
- 《擠垮它》 (1952)
- 《女將軍》The Female General (1958)
- 《晉察冀詩抄》Chen Zhen Yi Poetry (1959)
- 《魏巍文論集》 (1984)
