= Seo Do-young =

South Korean actor

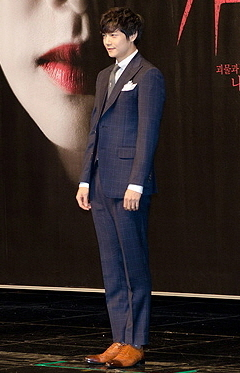
- Seo in February 2013
- Born: April 14, 1981 (age 45); Itami
- Education: Wonkwang University - Biology
- Occupation: Actor
- Years active: 1981–present
- Agent: GnG Productions
- Height: 187 cm (6 ft 2 in)

Korean name
- Hangul: 서도영
- Hanja: 徐道永
- RR: Seo Doyeong
- MR: Sŏ Toyŏng

Seo Do-young is a South Korean actor.

== Career ==
Seo Do-young was a promising model before he began his acting career, appearing in numerous runways for the Korea's leading fashion designers as well as several foreign designer shows such as Gucci, Dolce & Gabbana and Tommy Hilfiger. During his years as a model, he enrolled in acting classes in pursuit of his ultimate goal, to be an actor. After taking some supporting roles and appearing on TV commercials, he was cast—to everyone's surprise—as the leading actor for the Spring Waltz, the fourth and final feature of the season-themed drama series by TV director Yoon Seok-ho.

== Filmography ==
=== Television series ===
- Want a Taste? (SBS, 2019–20)
- Gangnam Scandal (SBS, 2018-2019)
- Reverse (MBC, 2017)
- Beautiful You (MBC, 2015)
- Miss Mamma Mia (KBS, 2015)
- Enchanting Neighbor (SBS, 2015)
- Flower of Revenge (jTBC, 2013)
- My One and Only (KBS1, 2011)
- The Thorn Birds (KBSH 2, 2011)
- Yaksha (OCN, 2010)
- Invincible Lee Pyung Kang (KBS2, 2009)
- Friend, Our Legend (MBC, 2009)
- KBS TV Novel: "Spring Spring Spring" (KBS1, 2008)
- Unstoppable Marriage (KBS2, 2007)
- MBC Best Theater: "Amnesia" (MBC, 2007)
- Spring Waltz (KBS2, 2006)
- Emperor of the Sea (KBS2, 2005)
- Drama City: "Oh! Sarah" (KBS2, 2003)

=== Film ===
- The Poem of Jeolla (2010)

=== Variety show ===
- Real Documentary - Singles in Seoul 2: Metrosexual (OnStyle, 2004)

== Awards and nominations ==
Year	Award	Category	Nominated work	Result	Ref.
2019	2019 SBS Drama Awards	Top Excellence Award, Best Actor in a Serial Drama	Gangnam Scandal, Want a Taste?	Won	
2020	7th APAN Star Awards	Excellence Award, Actor in Serial Drama	Want a Taste?	Nominated	
