= Choi Woo-hyuk =

- Hangul: 최우혁
- RR: Choe Uhyeok
- MR: Ch'oe Uhyŏk

Choi Woo-hyuk (Korean: 최우혁) is a Korean name consisting of the family name Choi and the given name Woo-hyuk, and may also refer to:

- Choi Woo-hyuk (actor, born 1985), South Korean actor
- Choi Woo-hyuk (actor, born 1997), South Korean actor
