= Yiruma =

South Korean pianist and composer (born 1978)

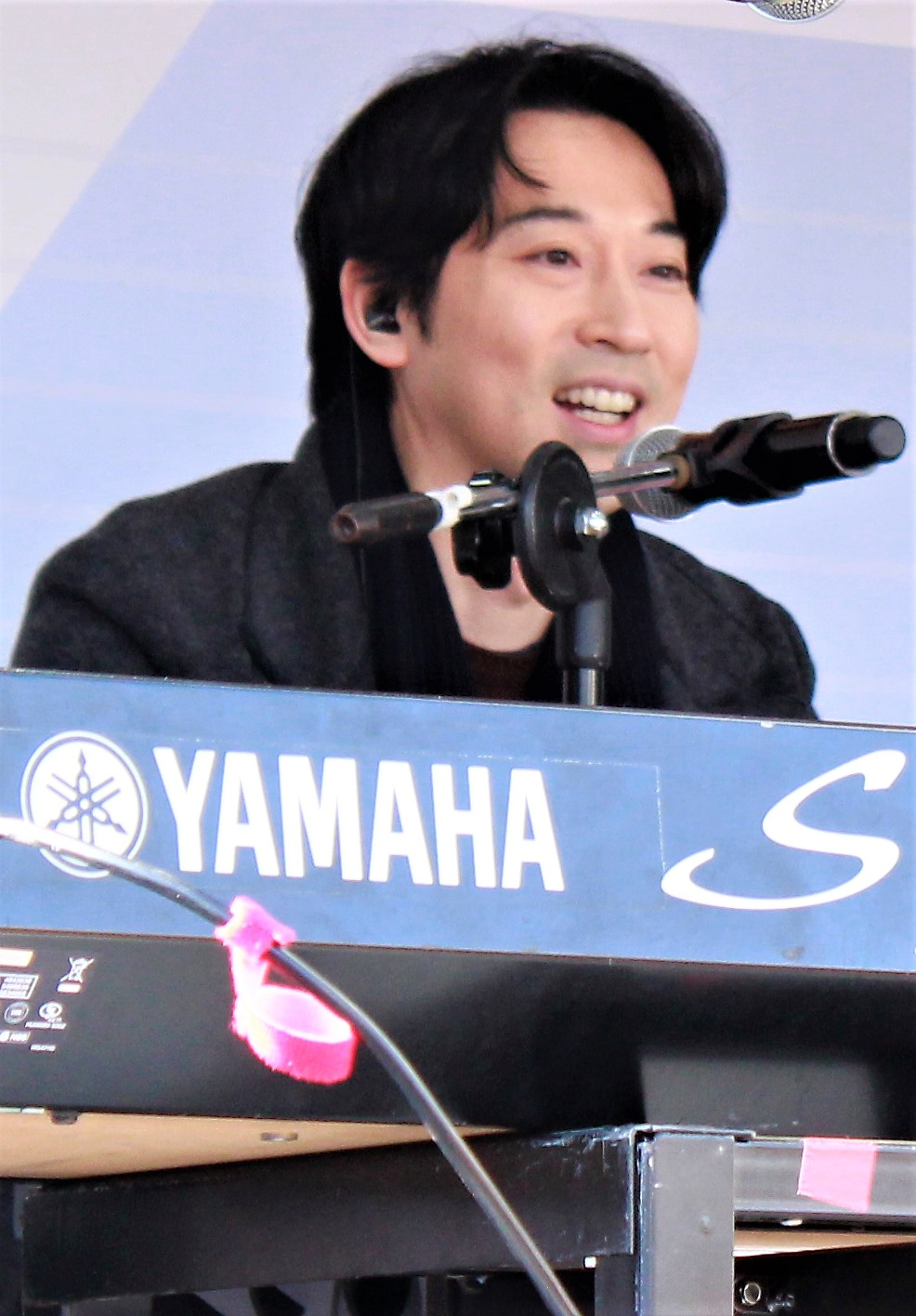
- Yiruma in 2017
- Born: Lee Ru-ma; 15 February 1978 (age 48); Seoul, South Korea
- Education: King's College London
- Occupations: Composer; pianist
- Years active: 2001–present
- Spouse: Son Hye-Im (m. 2007)
- Children: 1
- Musical career
- Genre: Instrumental
- Instrument: Piano
- Label: Mind Tailor Music

Korean name
- Hangul: 이루마
- RR: I Ruma
- MR: I Ruma
- Website: yiruma.com

Lee Ru-ma (Korean: 이루마; born 15 February 1978), better known by the stage name Yiruma (stylized from Lee Ru-ma), is a South Korean pianist and composer.

== Early life ==
Yiruma was born in Seoul. At five years old, he began learning the piano and moved to the United Kingdom, where he attended the Purcell School for Young Musicians and graduated from King's College London.

== Career ==
After graduation, Yiruma returned to South Korea and released his debut album, Love Scene, in 2001. His breakthrough came when the track "When Love Falls" was used as the theme for Choi Ji-woo's character in the hugely popular drama Winter Sonata. The surge of interest in his music led to him holding his first solo concert in April 2002. He gained wider public recognition for composing the soundtrack of the animation Doggy Poo and performing the piano versions of the soundtracks from the popular 2006 drama Spring Waltz. After completing his military service, he made his comeback with a nationwide tour spanning twenty different cities and featured Kim Bum-soo and Lee Hyun-woo as guest singers. On 1 January 2009, he became a DJ for KBS 1FM Yiruma's Music from All Around the World.

Yiruma's 2011 compilation album The Best: Reminiscent, 10th Anniversary debuted at number three in the Billboard classical charts in July 2020 and reached number one just two weeks later; Billboard's classical charts had done away with its rules of only counting albums sold in the United States and recognizing albums released in the last eighteen months. His music has seen a resurgence in popularity due to the COVID-19 lockdowns in 2020. Several videos of his compositions posted on YouTube and other social media platforms have garnered millions of views, including "River Flows in You".

From 2010 to 2011, Yiruma began presenting the MBC music program Wednesday Art Stage (수요예술무대) alongside singer Bobby Kim. The duo initially raised eyebrows due to their vastly different musical backgrounds and genres and the fact that they had no hosting or presenting experience but their candidness won audiences over. He and Kim returned when the program was revived in 2013 and rebranded as TV Art Stage (TV 예술무대). They were joined by actress and former newsreader Kim Sung-kyung.

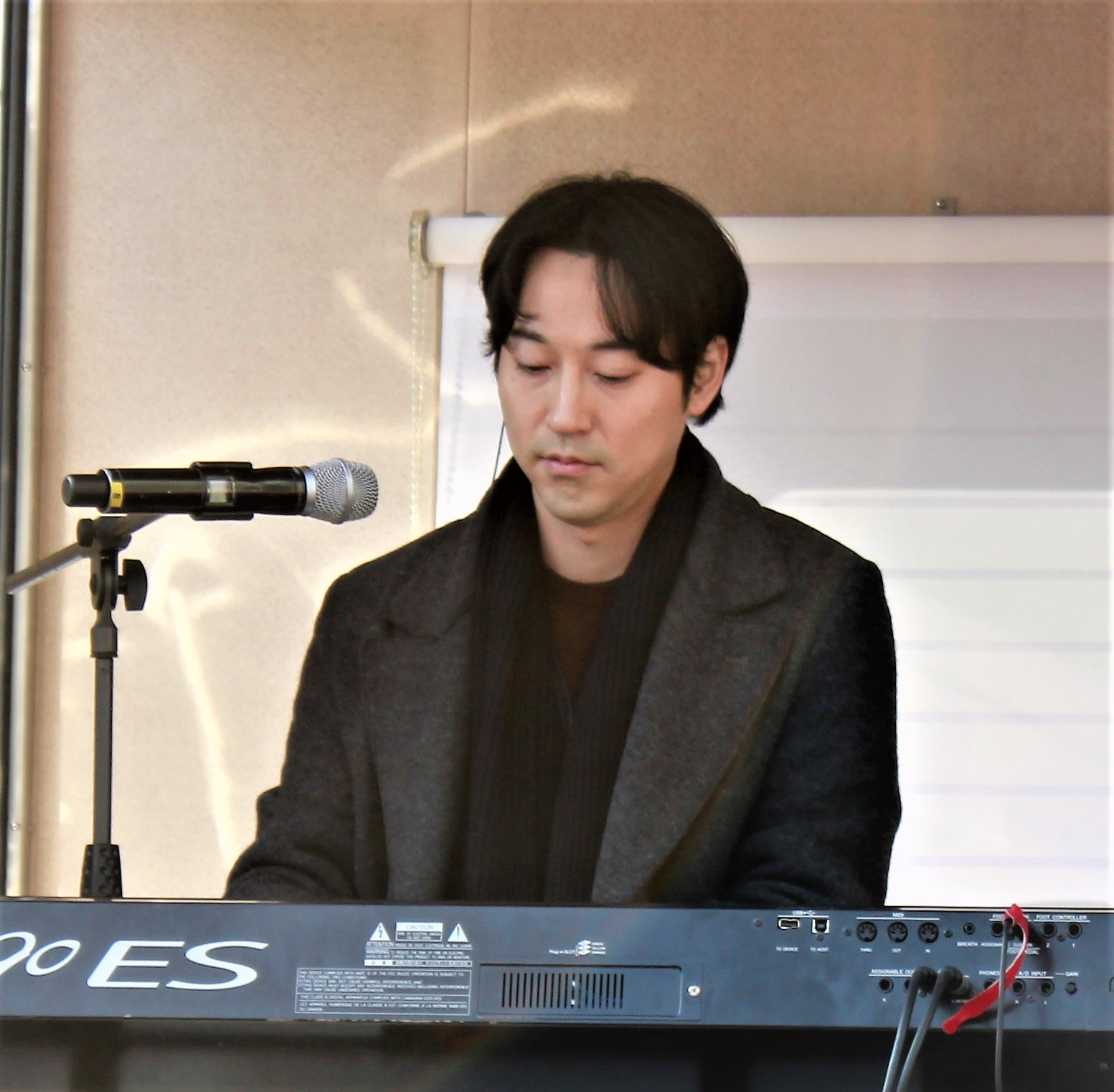
Yiruma performing in 2017

In 2010, Yiruma filed a civil suit against his then-label Stomp Music to terminate his exclusive contract due to unfair payment percentages, with the judge mediating an agreement that the company should pay 30% of the profits to him. He filed a second lawsuit in 2018 as the company had failed to fulfill the condition. However, Stomp Music appealed the initial trial and the case was brought to the Supreme Court. In April 2024, the Supreme Court dismissed the appeal and ordered the company to pay Yiruma his overdue share of the profits, which had amounted to 2.6 billion won (US$2,200,000) by then.

== Personal life ==
Yiruma previously held British citizenship, which he voluntarily renounced in order to enlist for mandatory military service. He enlisted in the Republic of Korea Navy in July 2006 and was assigned to public relations duties. He was discharged in August 2008.

In April 2007, while on leave, Yiruma married his girlfriend Son Hye-im, the older sister of actress and former Miss Korea contestant Son Tae-young. In 2008, they had a daughter.

== Discography ==
=== Studio albums ===
Title	Album details	Peak chart positions			Sales
Title	Album details	KOR	US Class- ical	US New Age	Sales
Love Scene	Released: 1 May 2001 (KOR); Label: Stomp Music; Format: CD, digital download	—	—	—	
First Love	Released: 4 December 2001 (KOR); Repackaged: 19 May 2005 (KOR); Label: Stomp Music; Format: CD, digital download	67	3	4	KOR: 27,251
From the Yellow Room	Released: 22 October 2003 (KOR); Label: Stomp Music; Format: CD, digital download	11	—	—	KOR: 21,438
Poemusic	Released: 29 November 2005 (KOR); Label: Stomp Music; Format: CD, digital download	97	—	—	KOR: 17,645
H.I.S. Monologue	Released: 2 November 2006 (KOR); Label: Stomp Music; Format: CD, digital download	—	—	—	
P.N.O.N.I.	Released: 21 October 2008 (KOR); Label: Stomp Music; Format: CD, digital download	—	—	—	
Stay in Memory	Released: 24 May 2012 (KOR); Label: Sony Music; Format: CD, digital download	11	—	—	KOR: 3,813
Blind Film	Released: 8 October 2013 (KOR); Label: Sony Music; Format: CD, digital download	15	—	—	KOR: 4,287
Piano	Released: 23 September 2015 (KOR); Label: Sony Music; Format: CD, digital download	23	—	—	KOR: 745
Frame	Released: 1 November 2017 (KOR); Repackaged: 19 December 2019; Label: Mind Tailor Music; Format: CD, digital download	36	—	—	KOR: 1,181
"—" denotes release did not chart Note: The South Korean Gaon Music Chart was established in 2010.

=== Compilation and special albums ===
Title	Album details	Peak chart positions						Sales
Title	Album details	AUT	GER	KOR	SWI	US Class- ical	US New Age	Sales
Piano Museum	Released: 16 December 2004 (JPN); Label: Universal Sigma; Format: CD, digital download	—	—	—	—	—	—	
Destiny of Love	Released: 19 April 2005 (KOR); Label: Stomp Music; Format: CD, digital download	—	—	—	—	—	—	KOR: 23,353
Ribbonized	Released: 28 April 2010 (KOR); Label: Stomp Music; Format: 6-CD box set	—	—	14	—	—	—	
The Best: Reminiscent 10th Anniversary	Released: 24 November 2011 (KOR); Label: Sony Music; Format: CD, LP, digital download	—	—	8	—	1	1	KOR: 22,783
The Very Best of Yiruma: Yiruma & Piano	Released: 30 November 2011 (KOR); Label: Stomp Music; Format: CD, digital download	—	—	8	—	—	—	KOR: 29,426
The Very Best of Yiruma: River Flows in You	Released: 2 December 2011 (EU); Label: Stomp Music, B1; Format: CD, digital download	72	29	—	84	—	—	
Healing Piano	Released: 6 November 2013 (KOR); Label: Stomp Music; Format: CD, digital download	—	—	28	—	—	—	KOR: 831
Atmosfera	Released: 25 June 2014 (KOR); Label: Sony Music; Format: CD, digital download	—	—	19	—	—	—	KOR: 827
Piano Serenade (너에게 보내는 피아노)	Released: 27 November 2014 (KOR); Label: Stomp Music; Format: CD, digital download	—	—	—	—	—	—	
The First Special Moment with Your Baby (아기와 나누는 첫 교감)	Released: 12 March 2015 (KOR); Label: Stomp Music; Format: CD, digital download	—	—	34	—	—	—	
Yiruma: The Best Winter	Released: 10 November 2016 (KOR); Label: Stomp Music; Format: CD, digital download	—	—	—	—	—	—	
The Rewritten Memories	Released: 25 Mar 2021 (KOR); Label: Mind Tailor Music; Format: CD, digital download							
"—" denotes release did not chart Note: The South Korean Gaon Music Chart was established in 2010.

=== Film soundtracks ===
- Oasis and Yiruma (2002)
- Doggy Poo OST (2002)

=== Live albums ===
- Yiruma: Live at HOAM Art Hall (2005)

=== Extended plays ===
Title	EP details	Peak chart positions	Sales
Title	EP details	KOR	Sales
Nocturnal Lights... They Scatter	Released: 5 August 2004 (KOR); Label: Stomp Music; Format: CD, digital download	—	KOR: 18,198
Movement on a Theme by Yiruma	Released: 13 October 2009 (KOR); Label: Stomp Music; Format: CD, digital download	—	
Movement on a Theme by Yiruma: 2nd Movement	Released: 2 December 2009 (KOR); Label: Stomp Music; Format: CD, digital download	—	
Room with a View	Released: 22 May 2020 (KOR); Label: Mind Tailor Music; Format: CD, digital download	90	
"—" denotes release did not chart Note: The South Korean Gaon Music Chart was established in 2010.

=== Singles ===
Title	Year	Peak chart positions					Sales	Certifications	Album
Title	Year	KOR	AUT	FRA	GER	SWI	Sales	Certifications	Album
"Un homme et une femme" (남(男) & 여(女))	2001	—	—	—	—	—			Love Scene
"River Flows in You" (with Samuel Vallee)	2001	24	11	62	20	41		BPI: Gold; BVMI: Platinum	First Love / River Flows in You single album (2011)
"Kiss the Rain"	2003	—	—	—	—	—			From the Yellow Room
"Nocturnal Lights... They Scatter"	2004	—	—	—	—	—			Nocturnal Lights... They Scatter
"Wonder Boy" (가을과 겨울이 만났다)	2005	—	—	—	—	—			Poemusic
"Lord... Hold My Hand"	2006	—	—	—	—	—			H.I.S. Monologue
"Loanna"	2008	—	—	—	—	—			P.N.O.N.I.
"River Flows in You" (with Ruvin)	2009	91	—	—	—	—			Movement on a Theme by Yiruma
"To My Heart" (나에게로) (with Swin)	2009	—	—	—	—	—			Movement on a Theme by Yiruma: 2nd Movement
"Kiss the Rain" (with Shin Yong-jae of 4Men, MIIII, Bigtone)	2012	9	—	—	—	—	KOR: 550,203		Non-album single
"Stay in Memory" (기억에 머무르다)	2012	—	—	—	—	—			Stay in Memory
"Blind Film"	2013	—	—	—	—	—			Blind Film
"Dance"	2015	—	—	—	—	—			Piano
"Sick of You" (해로운 너) (with Li Gyu-hwan)	2017	—	—	—	—	—			Non-album single
"Flower"	2017	—	—	—	—	—			Frame
"Framed" (String Version)	2017	—	—	—	—	—			Frame
"Couldn't Put in Words" (못다한 내 마음을) (with Danny Jung)	2018	—	—	—	—	—			The Way You Keep Friendship – SSaW Tribute Vol.5
"Room with a View"	2020	—	—	—	—	—			Room with a View
"Sunset Bird"	2020	—	—	—	—	—			Room with a View
"Darling" (달링) (with 2Face, featuring Shallyn)	2020	—	—	—	—	—			Non-album single
"—" denotes release did not chart Note: The South Korean Gaon Music Chart was established in 2010.
