= Luruhnya Bunga Cinta =

2023 Malaysian television series

- Promotional poster
- Genre: Melodrama; Romance; Family
- Based on: Autumn in My Heart by Oh Soo-yeon
- Written by: Hafiz Halim; Intan Zarina Mohd Yasin
- Directed by: Riza Baharudin
- Starring: Tracie Sinidol; Redza Rosli; Aniq Durar; Bella Luna; Nabila Razali; Auni Yusri
- Opening theme: Belakang Tabir - Syamel
- Ending theme: Belakang Tabir - Syamel
- Country of origin: Malaysia
- Original language: Malay
- No. of seasons: 2
- No. of episodes: 40

Production
- Executive producer: Zaitun Mohd Jiwa
- Producers: Zetty Alia Dato Ramly; Zetty Adila Dato Ramly
- Running time: 42 minutes
- Production company: Global Station

Original release
- Network: TV3 iQIYI
- Release: September 19, 2023 – November 21, 2024

Related
- Autumn in My Heart

Luruhnya Bunga Cinta (English: Falling of Love Flowers) is a 2023 Malaysian television series based on South Korean television series Autumn in My Heart, starring Tracie Sinidol, Redza Rosli, Aniq Durar, Bella Luna, Nabila Razali and Auni Yusri. It was aired on TV3 from September 19 to October 16, 2023, at 19:00 (MST). It is also available for streaming on Tonton in Malaysia, and on IQiyi in selected regions.

== Synopsis ==
The love story between Nuh and Nuha that was hindered due to their previous relationship status that was once called siblings.

== Cast ==
=== Main ===
- Tracie Sinidol as Nuha Hamisya
- Redza Rosli as Nuh Adrian
- Aniq Durar as Awal
- Bella Luna as Aleen
- Nabila Razali as Mysara
- Auni Yusri as Aara

=== Supporting ===
- Hafiz Halim as Anwar
- Laila Nasir as Noriah
- Eizlan Yusof as Jamaludin
- Zila Bakarin as Adita
- Watie Sadali as Datin Maziah
- Shah Rezza as Tan Sri Izzam
- Raja Azmi as Puan Seri Zaleha
- Mamu Kokoot as Mamu
- Iman Suhana as Kalsom
- Zana as Puan Zainab
- Zulkifli Sudin as Encik Rizal
