= Summer Scent =

2003 South Korean television series

- Promotional Poster
- Also known as: Scent of Summer; Endless Love: Summer Scent
- Hangul: 여름향기
- Hanja: 여름香氣
- RR: Yeoreumhyanggi
- MR: Yŏrŭmhyanggi
- Genre: Romance, Melodrama
- Created by: KBS Drama Production
- Written by: Choi Ho-yeon; Kim Eun-hee; Yoon Eun-kyung
- Directed by: Yoon Seok-ho
- Starring: Song Seung-heon; Son Ye-jin; Ryu Jin; Han Ji-hye
- Country of origin: South Korea
- Original language: Korean
- No. of episodes: 20

Production
- Executive producer: Kim Jong-shik
- Producer: Kim Chul-kyu
- Cinematography: Kim Yong-su
- Camera setup: Multi-camera
- Running time: 60 minutes Mondays and Tuesdays at 21:55 (KST)
- Production company: Pan Entertainment

Original release
- Network: KBS2
- Release: July 7 – September 9, 2003

Related
- Autumn in My Heart (2000); Winter Sonata (2002); Spring Waltz (2006)

Summer Scent (Korean: 여름향기; RR: Yeoreumhyanggi) is a 2003 South Korean television series starring Song Seung-heon, Son Ye-jin, Ryu Jin, and Han Ji-hye. It is the third installment of season-themed tetralogy Endless Love drama series directed by Yoon Seok-ho. It aired on KBS2 from July 7 to September 9, 2003, on Mondays and Tuesdays at 21:55 (KST) for 20 episodes.

The series had an average viewership rating of 15.9% and reached a peak viewership of 19.2%

== Plot ==
Yoo Min-woo's (Song Seung-heon) first love was Seo Eun-hye (Shin Ae). However, Eun-hye gets into a car accident and dies. Without Min-woo's knowledge, her parents decide to donate her organs. Shim Hye-won (Son Ye-jin) has suffered from a possibly fatal heart disease ever since childhood. Miraculously, she finds that she will be obtaining a heart from a donor, the deceased Eun-hye.

Suffering from the pain of losing his girlfriend, Min-woo goes to Italy to study, with the memories of Eun-hye still lingering in his heart. When he returns to Korea, fate takes a turn and brings Hye-won and Min-woo together. When the two first meet at the airport, Hye-won's heart (Eun-hye's heart) oddly beats faster when she is around Min-woo.

Park Jung-jae (Ryu Jin) is Hye-won's fiancé. Jung-jae's younger sister, Park Jung-ah (Han Ji-hye) meets Min-woo in Italy and falls for him. Meanwhile, Min-woo feels guilt towards Eun-hye, because his feelings of love are stirred once again as he keeps being around Hye-won.

Coincidentally, Min-woo ends up being hired as the art director for Jung-jae's project "Summer Scent," with Hye-won as their florist. Hiding their prior encounter in the forest, they awkwardly greet each other as if they'd never met. During the project, their fondness deepens, and Min-woo begins to "recognize" similarities between Eun-hye and Hye-won. Hye-won, on the other hand, believes it to be fate that her heart beats faster whenever Min-woo is near. Their fondness for each other soon triggers Jung-ah's and shortly thereafter, Jung-jae's suspicions. Jung-jae, however, chooses to turn a blind eye as he deeply loves Hye-won. It is then Hye-won's turn to be confused as to whether her feelings for Min-woo are true, or a physiological result of Eun-hye's past feelings for him. As a result, she decides to leave Min-woo, trying to cover up her feelings of guilt towards Jung-jae and Jung-ah. She returns to Jung-jae's side and agrees to marry him.

To forget Hye-won, Min-woo decides to leave for Italy indefinitely, but only after seeing her one last time. At Hye-won's wedding, Min-woo casts one last glance at her and then leaves. With Min-woo near, Hye-won's heart once more signals his presence, and thus alerted, she sees Min-woo leaving. Desperately trying to catch Min-woo, Hye-won collapses. Min-woo rushes Hye-won to the hospital with Jung-jae arriving a little later. Jung-jae, angry at Min-woo for having caused Hye-won's collapse, tells him to leave for Italy but Min-woo agrees to leave only after Hye-won has regained consciousness. Soon, Hye-won wakes up and a deeply angered Jung-jae forbids Min-woo to see her, ordering him to leave on the spot. However, Min-woo agrees to leave only after Hye-won promises him to undergo heart surgery, for not having the operation would mean her certain demise.

Soon after his arrival in Italy, Min-woo receives a letter notifying him that Hye-won died during the operation. In fact, she has survived the initial surgery and gone to the United States for another heart transplant.

Three years later, with memories of Hye-won in his heart, Min-woo returns to Korea as the manager of an Art Centre. During his absence, Hye-won has undergone a heart transplant after the initial surgery, and then traveled to the United States for another transplant. On his way up the steps to the Art Centre and on her way down after her delivery, they meet again. The abnormal beating of Hye-won's new heart signals Min-woo's presence to her, and thus once and for all, confirms their love for each other to be authentic.

== Cast ==
- Song Seung-heon as Yoo Min-woo
- Son Ye-jin as Shim Hye-won
- Ryu Jin as Park Jung-jae
- Han Ji-hye as Park Jung-Ah
- Shin Ae as Seo Eun-hye
- Jo Eun-sook as Oh Jang-mi
- Ahn Jung-hoon as Ji Dae-poong
- Kim Hae-sook as Min-woo's mother
- Kim Yong-gun as Jung-jae's father
- Ha Jae-young
- Kang Ji-hwan as Jung-ah's husband (bit part, ep 20)

== Filming locations ==
The following filming locations were featured in the series:

- Boseong Tea Gardens
- Korea Botanical Garden
- Deogyusan National Park
- Muju Resort

== Soundtrack ==
- Released: August 5, 2003
- Label: Yedang Entertainment
1. Main Title
2. 비밀 (Secret) - Jung In-ho
3. Missing U - Seo Jin-young
4. 어쩌면 (Perhaps) - Seo Jin-young
5. 여름향기 (Summer Scent) - Jung In-ho
6. Serenade Instrumental (Guitar)
7. Second Romance - Seo Jin-young
8. 여름향기 2 (Summer Scent 2) Instrumental
9. 두 번째 사랑 (Second Time in Love) - Seo Jin-young
10. 어쩌면 (Perhaps) Instrumental (Piano)
11. Serenade - Yoo Mi-sook (Soprano)
12. 비밀 (Secret) Inst. (Piano)
13. 두 번째 사랑 (Second Time in Love) Inst. (Piano & Guitar)
14. Love - Seo Jin-young
15. 비밀 (Secret) Instrumental (Guitar)
16. 사랑한다면 (If I Said I Loved You) - Jung In-ho & Seo Jin-young
17. 여우비 (Fox Rain) Instrumental
18. Love Instrumental (Piano & Guitar)

== Remake ==
- Dejavu di Kinabalu a 2012 Malay drama remake starring Tiz Zaqyah and Aqasha directed by Eirma Fatima and Mohd Fazli Yahya aired by TV3 Malaysia.

== See also ==
- Heart
- Organ transplant
- Cellular memory
- List of Korean television shows
- Contemporary culture of South Korea
