= Autumn in My Heart =

2000 South Korean romantic television series

- Promotional poster
- Also known as: Autumn Tale; Endless Love: Autumn in My Heart
- Hangul: 가을동화
- Hanja: 가을童話
- Lit.: Autumn Fairy Tale
- RR: Gaeul donghwa
- MR: Kaŭl tonghwa
- Genre: Melodrama; Romance
- Created by: KBS Drama Production
- Written by: Oh Soo-yeon
- Directed by: Yoon Seok-ho
- Starring: Song Seung-heon; Song Hye-kyo; Won Bin
- Country of origin: South Korea
- Original language: Korean
- No. of episodes: 16

Production
- Executive producer: Yoon Heung-shik
- Producer: Lee Hyung-min
- Running time: 60 minutes
- Production company: KBS

Original release
- Network: KBS2
- Release: September 18 – November 7, 2000

Related
- Winter Sonata (2002); Summer Scent (2003); Spring Waltz (2006); Endless Love (Philippines); Demi Cinta (Indonesia); Luruhnya Bunga Cinta (Malaysia)

Autumn in My Heart (Korean: 가을동화) is a 2000 South Korean romantic television drama starring Song Seung-heon, Song Hye-kyo, and Won Bin. The series is the first installment of season-themed tetralogy Endless Love drama series directed by Yoon Seok-ho. It aired on KBS2 from September 18 to November 7, 2000, on Mondays and Tuesdays at 21:55 (KST) for 16 episodes.

The series was very successful in South Korea, averaging viewership ratings of 38.6% and reaching a peak viewership of 46.1%. It is considered a pioneer in Korean melodramatic series, launching a worldwide fever that is commonly referred to as the "Korean Wave". Tours of sites in Korea related to the show have been developed following its success.

== Synopsis ==
The story begins with toddler Yoon Joon-suh, accidentally causing the switch of his sister and another baby when he drops the name cards on the two babies' cribs in the hospital's baby room. A nurse who comes in puts the name cards back incorrectly. The story then jumps forward to the teenage years of the two main characters: Yoon Eun-suh (Moon Geun-young) and Yoon Joon-suh (Choi Woo-hyuk). Eun-suh is the most popular girl in class, which incites the jealousy of her rival, Choi Shin-ae (Lee Ae-jung). Shin-ae is smart but does not get the attention she craves from the teacher and her classmates.

When Eun-suh gets hit by a truck and needs a blood transfusion, it is found out that she is not the Yoons' biological daughter. She instead belongs to the Chois. Choi Shin-ae is also discovered to not be the Choi's biological daughter, but the Yoons'. In the end, the two daughters return to their original birth parents. Shin-ae moves in with the Yoon family, and Eun-suh moves in with Mrs. Choi, (her biological father is dead) who operates a small restaurant living in abject poverty. Their situations are now reversed. Shin-ae is the more popular girl in class and Eun-suh is the one ignored. Shortly after the switch, the Yoon family moves to the United States and Eun-suh loses touch with them.

Ten years later, Joon-suh (Song Seung-heon) returns to South Korea as a successful artist. He goes back to his hometown. He encounters his old friend, Han Tae-seok (Won Bin), who stays at the hotel where Eun-suh (Song Hye-kyo) works as a telephone receptionist. Tae-seok, (who doesn't know about the brother and sister mix-up) falls in love with Eun-suh and manipulates her until she is fired from her job. One day Eun-suh sees Joon-suh and follows him to the beach where he is with his fiancée Yumi (Han Na-na) and Tae-seok. The two "siblings" finally meet again after ten years.

Eun-suh and Joon-suh appears to have a sibling relationship in front of the others, but they meet each other secretly and fall in love. Shin-ae (Han Chae-young) finds out about their relationship and exposes the two after she finds a love letter Eun-suh wrote to Joon-suh. The two decide to stay together, but are soon forced apart again because their parents are against the union. Yumi hurts herself and blackmails Joon-suh with suicide to hold on to him.

As a fight between Joon-suh and Tae-seok erupts over their love for Eun-suh, she discovers she has leukemia (the same fatal condition that killed her biological father). She doesn't tell anyone except Tae-seok, who offers to pay for her treatment. When her health deteriorates, the others begin finding out the extent of her condition. Eun-suh soon falls into a coma. Joon-suh finds out about Eun-suh's health and reacts with shock and fear, while Tae-seok forces Joon-suh to try to wake up Eun-suh. Eventually, Eun-suh wakes up, but is too weak to follow the treatment. When it is clear that there is no hope, Joon-suh takes her home so she can spend her last days with him. At this point, Yumi finally lets go of Joon-suh. Joon-suh proposes to Eun-suh and they get married. Eun-suh dies as Joon-suh carries her around the beach where they spent her birthday as teenagers.

Before Eun-suh dies, she tells Joon-suh to move on and continue living. However, Joon-suh, dazed and grief-stricken by the death of his love, is struck by a truck in the same place as Eun-suh's accident during her teenage years.

== Cast ==
=== Main ===
- Song Seung-heon as Yoon Joon-suh
  - Choi Woo-hyuk as young Joon-suh
- Song Hye-kyo as Yoon/Choi Eun-suh
  - Moon Geun-young as young Eun-suh
- Won Bin as Han Tae-seok

=== Supporting ===
- Han Chae-young as Choi/Yoon Shin-ae
  - Lee Ae-jung as young Shin-ae
- Han Na-na as Shin Yoo-mi
- Jung Dong-hwan as Professor Yoon (Joon-suh's father)
- Sunwoo Eun-sook as Lee Kyung-ha (Joon-suh's mother)
- Kim Hae-sook as Kim Soon-im (Eun-suh's mother)

=== Others ===
- Kim Na-woon as Housekeeping supervisor Kim
- Kim Hyung-jong as Ji-han
- Seo Yoon-jae as Kang-hee

== Soundtrack ==
The 13-track soundtrack for Autumn in My Heart includes Jung Il-young's heartfelt ballads "Reason", "Prayer" and "In My Dream" as well as the main flute theme and the guitar and piano versions of some of the songs. "Romance", also known as "Forbidden Love", is a classic piece used for this soundtrack. It comes from a famous work of unknown authorship "Spanish Romance".

1. Main Title (Flute ver.)
2. Reason – Jung Il-young (Yoo Seung-bum/Lyrics by Kim Won-hee)
3. Romance – Choi Tae-won
4. Gido (Prayer) – Jung Il-young (Jung Jin Soo/Lyrics by Choi Hee Jin)
5. Remember – Park Jung-Won
6. Eolmana Naega (Sincerely) – Yoon Chang-gun
7. Reason (Instrumental ver.)
8. Romance (Piano ver.) – Lee Hong-rae
9. Nunmul (Tears) – Lee Hong-rae
10. Eolmana Naega (Sincerely) (Guitar ver.) – Guitar by Ham Choon-ho
11. Kkum Sogeseo (In My Dream) – Jung Il-young
12. Eolmana Naega (Sincerely) (Piano ver.) – Piano by Yoo Jung-young
13. Gido (Prayer) (Piano ver.)

A song played during emotional scenes, but excluded from the soundtrack, was "Return to Love" by Kevin Kern.

== Reception ==
In June 2024, Rolling Stone India called it “…a true tearjerker” and classic K-drama whose intense focus on pain, unrequited love, and emotional suffering defined its narrative impact.

== Awards ==
37th Baeksang Arts Awards - 2001

- Best New Actor for TV – Won Bin
- Popularity Award, Actress – Song Hye-kyo

KBS Drama Awards – 2000

- Excellence Award, Actor – Won Bin
- Best Supporting Actress – Kim Hae-sook
- Best Young Actress – Moon Geun-young
- Popularity Award, Actor – Song Seung-heon
- Popularity Award, Actress – Song Hye-kyo
- Photogenic Award, Actor – Song Seung-heon
- Photogenic Award, Actress – Song Hye-kyo
- Viewer's Choice Drama

== Remake ==
- Demi Cinta, a 2005 Indonesian remake starring Rionaldo Stockhorst and Leony Vitria Hartanti
- Endless Love, a 2010 Philippine remake starring Dingdong Dantes, Marian Rivera, and Dennis Trillo
- Autumn in My Heart, a 2013 Thai remake starring Jesdaporn Pholdee and Sucharat Manaying, and produced by Ananda Everingham
- Paramparça, a 2014 Turkish drama remake starring Erkan Petekkaya and Nurgül Yeşilçay
- Autumn Fairy Tale, a 2019 Chinese web drama remake starring Zhao Lusi and Xu Kai
- Luruhnya Bunga Cinta, a 2023 Malay drama remake starring Redza Rosli and Tracie Sindol, directed by Riza Baharudin
- Oskolki, a 2018 Russian remake
- Autumn of the Heart, a 2024 Saudi Arabian adaptation
