= Gangnam Scandal =

2018–2019 South Korean television series

- Promotional Poster
- Hangul: 강남 스캔들
- RR: Gangnam seukaendeul
- MR: Kangnam sŭk'aendŭl
- Genre: Romantic comedy Melodrama; Family
- Written by: Park Hye-ryun
- Directed by: Yoon Ryu-hae
- Starring: Lim Yoon-ho; Shin Go-eun; Seo Do-young; Bang Eun-hee; Hwang Bo-mi
- Country of origin: South Korea
- Original language: Korean
- No. of episodes: 123 (Note: Originally scheduled to air for 120 episodes, the series was extended by three episodes in lieu of two preempts.)

Production
- Executive producer: Kwon Hyo-jin
- Camera setup: Single-camera
- Running time: 30 minutes
- Production company: SBS Plus

Original release
- Network: SBS TV
- Release: November 26, 2018 – May 17, 2019

Gangnam Scandal (Korean: 강남 스캔들; stylized as Kangnam Scandal) is a South Korean television series starring Lim Yoon-ho, Shin Go-eun, Seo Do-young, Bang Eun-hee and Hwang Bo-mi. It aired daily on SBS from November 26, 2018 to May 17, 2019.

== Synopsis ==
Eun So Yoo works as a stylist. She struggles to make enough money to pay for her mother's operation fee. Due to a case, So Yoo gets involved with Choi Seo Joon. He is rich and from a chaebol family. So Yoo pretends to love him for his money, but she falls truly in love with him. Seo Joon has an incurable disease. He is more interested in playing around than working and he doesn't believe in true love.

== Cast ==
=== Main ===
- Lim Yoon-ho as Choi Seo-joon
- Shin Go-eun as Eun So-yoo
- Seo Do-young as Hong Se-hyun
- Bang Eun-hee as Hong Baek-hee
- Hwang Bo-mi as Myung Ji-yoon

=== Supporting ===
==== People around Choi Seo-joon ====
- Im Chae-moo as Choi Jin-bok (Seo-joon's father)
- Kim Kwang-min as Mo Tae-woong (Seo-joon's brother)
- Lee Yoo-jin as Choi Seo-hyung (Seo-joon's big sister)
- Hwang Geum-byul as Choi Seo-kyung (Seo-joon's other sister)
- Won Ki-joon as Bang Yoon-tae (Seo-joon's brother-in-law)

==== People around Eun So-yoo ====
- Chu Gwi-jung as Oh Geum-hee (So-yoo's mother)
- Ahn Ji-hwan as Eun Jae-man (So-yoo's father)
- Hae In as Eun So-dam (So-yoo's little sister)

==== Others ====
- Kyeon Mi-ri as Jang Mi-ri
- Choi Su-rin as Baek Choon-mi
- Choi Baek-sun as Wang Tae-bok
- Min Ji-young as Bang Soo-kyung
- Jang Jung-hee as President Ko
- Lee Chang as Team Leader Lee
- Lee Hoon-sung as Team Leader Hwang
- Lee Hae-woon as Choi Jin-wook
- Kim Joon-hwan as Kim Woong-ki
- Seo Woo-jin as (Supporting)
- Baek Hyun-joo as Park Mak-rye

== Ratings ==
- In this table, the blue numbers represent the lowest ratings and the red numbers represent the highest ratings.
- NR denotes that the drama did not rank in the top 20 daily programs on that date.
- N/A denotes that the rating is not known.

Ep.	Original broadcast date	Average audience share		
Ep.	Original broadcast date	AGB Nielsen		TNmS
Ep.	Original broadcast date	Nationwide	Seoul	Nationwide
1	November 26, 2018	6.9% (15th)	6.1% (17th)	8.6%
2	November 27, 2018	6.3% (15th)	5.3% (18th)	8.2%
3	November 28, 2018	6.3% (16th)	—N/a	8.2%
4	November 29, 2018	6.5% (15th)	6.3% (14th)	8.4%
5	November 30, 2018	2.5% (NR)	—N/a	
6	December 3, 2018	7.4% (13th)	6.8% (17th)	8.6%
7	December 4, 2018	7.2% (13th)	6.5% (16th)	8.0%
8	December 5, 2018	7.0% (14th)	6.2% (18th)	7.7%
9	December 6, 2018	7.2% (14th)	6.8% (14th)	8.7%
10	December 7, 2018	7.1% (17th)	6.6% (16th)	—N/a
11	December 10, 2018	6.7% (15th)	6.2% (16th)	7.1%
12	December 11, 2018	7.3% (13th)	7.0% (18th)	8.0%
13	December 12, 2018	6.9% (14th)	6.7% (15th)	8.3%
14	December 13, 2018	7.4% (14th)	7.1% (14th)	8.6%
15	December 14, 2018	7.1% (16th)	6.5% (15th)	8.2%
16	December 17, 2018	6.8% (17th)	6.1% (19th)	7.9%
17	December 18, 2018	7.1% (12th)	6.3% (17th)	7.9%
18	December 19, 2018	7.1% (15th)	7.0% (15th)	7.5%
19	December 20, 2018	7.6% (12th)	7.2% (13th)	8.2%
20	December 21, 2018	7.3% (14th)	6.8% (14th)	8.0%
21	December 24, 2018	7.1% (14th)	7.5% (13th)	7.7%
22	December 25, 2018	6.0% (NR)	—N/a	6.7%
23	December 26, 2018	7.3% (15th)	6.7% (14th)	8.2%
24	December 27, 2018	7.5% (14th)	7.1% (13th)	8.6%
25	December 28, 2018	7.4% (13th)	6.7% (14th)	9.1%
26	December 31, 2018	6.5% (16th)	6.3% (19th)	7.0%
27	January 1, 2019	5.1% (NR)	—N/a	
28	January 2, 2019	6.0% (20th)	—N/a	7.0%
29	January 3, 2019	7.6% (13th)	7.3% (13th)	8.0%
30	January 4, 2019	7.7% (16th)	7.4% (16th)	7.9%
31	January 7, 2019	7.1% (14th)	6.9% (14th)	7.7%
32	January 8, 2019	6.8% (15th)	—N/a	
33	January 9, 2019	6.6% (18th)	6.1% (19th)	7.4%
34	January 10, 2019	7.3% (14th)	6.5% (15th)	8.2%
35	January 11, 2019	5.2% (18th)	—N/a	6.0%
36	January 14, 2019	7.2% (13th)	6.8% (14th)	7.7%
37	January 15, 2019	6.7% (13th)	—N/a	7.4%
38	January 16, 2019	7.2% (13th)	6.6% (15th)	7.7%
39	January 17, 2019	7.2% (15th)	6.8% (16th)	8.5%
40	January 18, 2019	7.2% (16th)	7.0% (16th)	7.9%
41	January 21, 2019	6.9% (14th)	6.7% (16th)	7.2%
42	January 22, 2019	7.2% (10th)	6.7% (10th)	7.9%
43	January 23, 2019	6.3% (19th)	—N/a	6.6%
44	January 24, 2019	6.8% (15th)	6.3% (16th)	7.3%
45	January 25, 2019	6.8% (14th)	5.9% (16th)	7.5%
46	January 28, 2019	6.7% (15th)	—N/a	8.0%
47	January 29, 2019	6.5% (12th)	5.6% (18th)	8.3%
48	January 30, 2019	6.5% (19th)	6.7% (16th)	7.3%
49	January 31, 2019	6.9% (17th)	6.6% (18th)	7.6%
50	February 1, 2019	6.9% (15th)	6.0% (15th)	8.4%
51	February 4, 2019	4.7% (NR)	—N/a	
52	February 5, 2019	2.7% (NR)	—N/a	
53	February 6, 2019	4.5% (NR)	—N/a	
54	February 7, 2019	6.6% (16th)	6.5% (15th)	7.6%
55	February 8, 2019	6.8% (15th)	6.1% (16th)	9.3%
56	February 11, 2019	6.4% (16th)	5.6% (19th)	8.0%
57	February 12, 2019	6.8% (12th)	6.2% (17th)	8.1%
58	February 13, 2019	6.5% (19th)	6.0% (19th)	7.6%
59	February 14, 2019	6.5% (16th)	5.8% (16th)	8.4%
60	February 15, 2019	7.6% (15th)	6.7% (15th)	7.6%
61	February 18, 2019	6.0% (17th)	—N/a	8.0%
62	February 19, 2019	6.3% (16th)	5.8% (19th)	7.8%
63	February 20, 2019	6.1% (18th)	5.6% (19th)	7.3%
64	February 21, 2019	7.1% (15th)	6.6% (15th)	8.4%
65	February 22, 2019	6.7% (15th)	6.2% (16th)	8.2%
66	February 25, 2019	7.1% (12th)	6.0% (16th)	7.8%
67	February 26, 2019	6.7% (11th)	6.4% (13th)	7.8%
68	February 27, 2019	6.5% (10th)	5.9% (13th)	7.6%
69	March 1, 2019 (Note: No episode was aired on February 28 due to news coverage of the 2019 North Korea–United States Hanoi Summit.)	5.6% (18th)	—N/a	6.7%
70	March 4, 2019	7.0% (12th)	6.6% (12th)	8.3%
71	March 5, 2019	6.8% (16th)	6.5% (18th)	8.0%
72	March 6, 2019	7.2% (15th)	6.8% (15th)	7.8%
73	March 7, 2019	7.5% (14th)	7.2% (14th)	8.0%
74	March 8, 2019	7.5% (13th)	7.2% (14th)	8.7%
75	March 11, 2019	6.6% (17th)	5.8% (19th)	7.0%
76	March 12, 2019	7.1% (14th)	6.9% (16th)	8.5%
77	March 13, 2019	6.7% (16th)	6.3% (19th)	7.6%
78	March 14, 2019	7.8% (12th)	7.5% (12th)	8.6%
79	March 15, 2019	6.8% (15th)	6.5% (16th)	8.6%
80	March 18, 2019	6.7% (14th)	6.6% (14th)	8.2%
81	March 19, 2019	7.0% (9th)	6.3% (15th)	7.9%
82	March 20, 2019	6.6% (16th)	6.0% (18th)	7.6%
83	March 21, 2019	7.5% (11th)	7.2% (12th)	8.7%
84	March 22, 2019	7.0% (14th)	6.4% (15th)	8.7%
85	March 25, 2019	6.7% (13th)	—N/a	8.8%
86	March 26, 2019	7.1% (10th)	7.0% (14th)	8.3%
87	March 27, 2019	6.8% (12th)	6.4% (12th)	7.8%
88	March 28, 2019	7.6% (9th)	7.0% (11th)	7.5%
89	March 29, 2019	7.2% (12th)	6.8% (11th)	8.1%
90	April 1, 2019	7.2% (13th)	6.3% (16th)	8.2%
91	April 2, 2019	7.3% (10th)	7.2% (13th)	8.2%
92	April 3, 2019	7.1% (12th)	6.4% (11th)	8.2%
93	April 4, 2019	7.7% (10th)	6.7% (10th)	8.5%
94	April 8, 2019 (Note: No episode was aired on April 5 due to news coverage of the Gangwon Province wildfire.)	7.2% (13th)	6.7% (13th)	7.5%
95	April 9, 2019	7.2% (16th)	7.0% (18th)	7.5%
96	April 10, 2019	6.8% (13th)	6.2% (15th)	—N/a
97	April 11, 2019	7.5% (10th)	7.4% (9th)	—N/a
98	April 12, 2019	7.0% (12th)	6.6% (13th)	—N/a
99	April 15, 2019	7.1% (9th)	6.8% (12th)	8.7%
100	April 16, 2019	7.1% (9th)	6.8% (10th)	7.8%
101	April 17, 2019	7.2% (10th)	6.7% (11th)	7.6%
102	April 18, 2019	6.9% (11th)	6.2% (13th)	7.3%
103	April 19, 2019	7.7% (11th)	6.9% (12th)	7.9%
104	April 22, 2019	7.5% (9th)	6.9% (11th)	8.2%
105	April 23, 2019	7.0% (11th)	6.5% (17th)	8.2%
106	April 24, 2019	7.7% (8th)	7.3% (10th)	7.8%
107	April 25, 2019	7.9% (9th)	7.6% (9th)	8.1%
108	April 26, 2019	7.5% (12th)	7.3% (13th)	9.2%
109	April 29, 2019	6.8% (14th)	6.2% (17th)	8.9%
110	April 30, 2019	7.5% (7th)	6.8% (11th)	8.3%
111	May 1, 2019	6.9% (10th)	6.5% (10th)	7.7%
112	May 2, 2019	7.7% (6th)	7.1% (8th)	—N/a
113	May 3, 2019	7.7% (8th)	7.4% (11th)	8.5%
114	May 6, 2019	6.4% (13th)	6.2% (15th)	7.1%
115	May 7, 2019	7.7% (5th)	7.4% (8th)	7.7%
116	May 8, 2019	7.2% (9th)	6.9% (10th)	7.9%
117	May 9, 2019	7.0% (9th)	6.4% (10th)	7.5%
118	May 10, 2019	7.4% (9th)	6.7% (11th)	8.3%
119	May 13, 2019	7.2% (9th)	6.8% (12th)	7.7%
120	May 14, 2019	7.7% (6th)	7.0% (9th)	8.4%
121	May 15, 2019	7.2% (8th)	6.3% (11th)	7.7%
122	May 16, 2019	7.2% (7th)	6.5% (9th)	8.7%
123	May 17, 2019	7.6% (11th)	6.9% (13th)	8.6%
Average		6.9%	— (Note: Due to some ratings not recorded, the exact average rating is unknown.)	—
