= Choi Soo-jin =

South Korean voice actress

- Occupation: Voice actress
- Relatives: Choi Soo-young (sister)

Korean name
- Hangul: 최수진
- RR: Choe Sujin
- MR: Ch'oe Sujin

Choi Soo-jin (Korean: 최수진) is a South Korean writer and voice actress who joined the Munhwa Broadcasting Corporation's Voice Acting Division in 1997.

== Roles ==
=== Broadcast TV ===
- Hwaje Jipjoong (Narration, MBC)
- History 50 (Radio drama, MBC)
- The Third Hospital (Television drama, tvN, cameo appearance episode 6)

=== Film dubbing ===
- GoldenEye (replacing Izabella Scorupco, Korea TV Edition, MBC)
- I Still Know What You Did Last Summer (replacing Jennifer Love Hewitt, Korea TV Edition, MBC)
- Sahara (replacing Brooke Shields, Korea TV Edition, MBC)
- Seven (replacing Gwyneth Paltrow, Korea TV Edition, MBC)
- Heartbreakers (replacing Jennifer Love Hewitt, Korea TV Edition, MBC)

=== Theater ===
- 2009: Jack the Ripper
- 2010: Goong
- 2010: Jack the Ripper
- 2011: The Wizard of Oz
- 2011: Winter Sonata
- 2012: Propose
- 2012: The Celestial Watch
- 2012: Finding Mr. Destiny
- 2013: Zanna, Don't!
- 2013–2014: Le Passe-Muraille
- 2014: Singin' in the Rain
- 2015: All Shook Up
- 2015: Through the Door
- 2015: Gloomy Day
- 2016: Newsies
