= Oh Soo-yeon =

South Korean screenwriter (born 1968)

- Born: October 4, 1968 (age 57); South Korea
- Other name: Oh Soo-yun
- Education: Ewha Womans University - Philosophy
- Occupation: Screenwriter
- Years active: 1993-present

Korean name
- Hangul: 오수연
- RR: O Suyeon
- MR: O Suyŏn

Oh Soo-yeon (Korean: 오수연; born October 4, 1968) is a South Korean television screenwriter. She is best known for writing the hit dramas Autumn in My Heart and Winter Sonata, her collaborations with director Yoon Seok-ho which are credited for helping launch the Korean Wave.

== Filmography ==
- Love Rain (KBS2, 2012)
- Star's Lover (SBS, 2008)
- Wedding (KBS2, 2005)
- MBC Best Theater "바다 아저씨께" (MBC, 2003)
- Love Letter (MBC, 2003)
- Winter Sonata (KBS2, 2002)
- Four Sisters (MBC, 2001)
- Autumn in My Heart (KBS2, 2000)
- All About Eve (MBC, 2000)
- Ad Madness (KBS2, 1999)
- LA Arirang (SBS, 1995-1999)
- New York Story (SBS, 1998)
- The Angel Within (KBS2, 1997)
- Papa (KBS2, 1996)
- 이별하는 여섯 단계 (KBS, 1995)
- Feelings (KBS2, 1994)
- 오박사네 사람들 (SBS, 1993-1994)
- Good morning, Yeongdong! (KBS, 1993-1994)
- 특집극 시인을 위하여 (KBS, 1993)
