= Enchanting Neighbor =

2015 South Korean television series

- Promotional poster
- Also known as: Fabulous Neighbor; Wonderful Neighbors
- Hangul: 황홀한 이웃
- RR: Hwangholhan iut
- MR: Hwanghorhan iut
- Genre: Melodrama; Romance; Revenge; Family
- Written by: Park Hye-ryeon
- Directed by: Park Kyeong-ryeol
- Starring: Yoon Son-ha; Seo Do-young; Park Tam-hee; Yoon Hee-seok
- Country of origin: South Korea
- Original language: Korean
- No. of episodes: 119

Production
- Executive producer: Park Young-soo
- Producer: Min Yeon-hong
- Production location: Korea
- Running time: 40 minutes Mondays to Fridays at 08:30 (KST)
- Production company: JS Pictures

Original release
- Network: Seoul Broadcasting System
- Release: January 5 – June 19, 2015

Enchanting Neighbor (Korean: 황홀한 이웃; RR: Hwangholhan iut) is a 2015 South Korean morning daily drama series starring Yoon Son-ha, Seo Do-young, Park Tam-hee and Yoon Hee-seok. The morning soap opera aired on SBS from January 5 to June 19, 2015, airing every Monday to Friday at 8:30 a.m. for 119 episodes.

== Cast ==
=== Main ===
- Yoon Son-ha as Gong Soo-rae

Seo Yu-na's registered mother

- Seo Do-young as Park Chan-woo
  - Jung Soo-hwan as young Park Chan-woo
- Park Tam-hee as Choi Yi-kyung
- Yoon Hee-seok as Seo Bong-gook

Seo Yu-na's registered father

=== Supporting ===
==== Gong Soo-rae's family ====
- Noh Young-kook as Kong Ma-joong
- Lee Mi-young as Na Jung-boon
- Baek Min-hyun as Gong Soo-geo
- Kim Su-jung as Seo Yu-na

Seo Bong-hee's daughter

==== Seo Bong-gook's family ====
- Lee Deok-hee as Im Yeon-ok
- Jeon Yeo-seo as Seo Bong-hee

Seo Yu-na's birth mother

==== Yi-kyung's family ====
- Choi Il-hwa as Choi In-seob
- Jo Yeon-woo as Choi Dae-kyung
- Lee Ja-young as Lee Jung-ah
- Shin Rin-ah as Park Se-bom

=== Extended cast ===
- Ahn Yeon-hong as Jo Eun-shil
- Seo Beom-seok as Oh Han-do
- Kim Na-young as Hwang Mi-ja
- Kim Gyu-sun as Jung Se-jin
- Park Cheon-guk
