= Lee Ae-jung =

South Korean actress (1987–2007)

- 이애정
- Born: Lee Ae-jung; March 17, 1987; Seoul, South Korea
- Died: September 6, 2007 (aged 20); Seoul, South Korea
- Other names: Yi Ae-jeong, Lee Ae-jeong
- Education: Hanyang University
- Occupation: Actress
- Years active: 2000–2007
- Known for: Autumn in My Heart

Korean name
- Hangul: 이애정
- RR: I Aejeong
- MR: I Aejŏng

Lee Ae-jung (Korean: 이애정; March 17, 1987 – September 6, 2007) was a South Korean actress.

== Biography ==
=== Career ===
Lee started her career as a child actress while in elementary school, and in 1999 while in 6th grade appeared in Little Prince. She rose to prominence for her role in Autumn Fairy Tale in 2000.

=== Death ===
Lee was diagnosed with brain cancer in January 2006, and underwent two surgeries at Seoul National University Hospital. She died on September 6, 2007, at 20 years old.

== Filmography ==
=== Television dramas ===
- Seoul Tango (SBS, 1998)
- Little Prince (KBS, 1999)
- Autumn Fairy Tale (KBS2, 2000) as the younger Shin-ae
- Four Sisters (MBC, 2001)
- Beautiful Days (SBS, 2001) as Shin Jae-eun
- Jump (EBS, 2005)
