= Lim Yoon-ho =

South Korean actor (born 1989)

- Born: October 20, 1989 (age 36); South Korea
- Other name: Im Yoon-ho
- Education: State University of New York
- Occupation: Actor
- Years active: 2013–present
- Agents: Huayi Brothers; DOH Culture Club

Korean name
- Hangul: 임윤호
- RR: Im Yunho
- MR: Im Yunho

Lim Yoon-ho (Korean: 임윤호; born October 20, 1989), also known as Im Yoon-ho, is a South Korean actor. He debuted in the MBC's television series 7th Grade Civil Servant (2013) and left a strong impression on the viewers with his acting performance.

== Filmography ==
=== Film ===
Year	Title	Role
2018	Heung-boo: The Revolutionist	Jung Yong-pil

=== Television ===
Year	Title	Role	Network
2013	7th Grade Civil Servant	JJ / Choi Woo-jin	MBC
2013	A Tale of Two Sisters	Jang Dong-wook	KBS1
2014	Wife Scandal	Young man	TV Chosun
2014	Quiz of God 4	Ko Kyung-han (ep.2)	OCN
2015	Iron Lady Cha	Kim Sun-woo	MBC
2015	KBS Drama Special – "The Wind Blows to the Hope"	Jo Sung-ki (young)	KBS2
2015	Prince of Prince	Lee Mong-ryong	Naver TV Cast
2018	Gangnam Scandal	Choi Seo-joon	SBS
