= Winter Sonata =

2002 South Korean television series

- Promotional poster
- Also known as: Winter Love Story; Winter Ballad; Endless Love: Winter Sonata
- Hangul: 겨울연가
- Hanja: 겨울戀歌
- Lit.: Winter Love Song
- RR: Gyeouryeonga
- MR: Kyŏuryŏn'ga
- Genre: Romance; Melodrama
- Developed by: Yoon Heung-shik (KBS Drama Division)
- Written by: Kim Eun-hee; Yoon Eun-kyung; Oh Soo-yeon
- Directed by: Yoon Seok-ho (KBS)
- Starring: Bae Yong-joon; Choi Ji-woo
- Music by: Park Jung-won
- Opening theme: "From the Beginning Until Now" by Ryu
- Ending theme: "From the Beginning Until Now" by Ryu
- Country of origin: South Korea
- Original language: Korean
- No. of episodes: 20

Production
- Executive producers: Kim Jong-sik (KBS); Kim Hee-yeol (Pan Entertainment)
- Producer: Lee Hyung-min
- Production locations: Seoul; Namiseom
- Camera setup: Multi-camera
- Running time: 60 minutes Mondays and Tuesdays at 21:55 (KST)
- Production company: Pan Entertainment

Original release
- Network: KBS2
- Release: January 14 – March 19, 2002

Related
- Autumn in My Heart (2000); Summer Scent (2003); Spring Waltz (2006)

Winter Sonata (Korean: 겨울연가; RR: Gyeouryeonga) is a 2002 South Korean television drama series, starring Bae Yong-joon and Choi Ji-woo. It is the second part of the season-themed tetralogy Endless Love drama series directed by Yoon Seok-ho. Filming primarily took place on the resort island of Namiseom and Seoul. It aired on KBS2 from January 14 to March 19, 2002, on Mondays and Tuesdays at 21:55 (KST) for 20 episodes. It has also been adapted into an anime series and a stage musical.

== Synopsis ==
The story begins when Joon-sang (Bae Yong-joon), the son of an eminent musician, moves to Chuncheon, a rural city in South Korea. As an extraordinarily talented student, Joon-sang is welcomed by his fellow students as well as his teachers, but remains a quiet, introverted teenager. As a result of the belief that his biological father is dead, and serious disagreements with his mother, Joon-sang believes that no one truly loves him.

On his way to school one day, Joon-sang's classmate Yoo-jin (Choi Ji-woo), while sitting next to him on the bus, falls asleep on his shoulder. After a few weeks, the two forge a close friendship. One day, Joon-sang convinces Yoo-jin to escape school together. On the way, Joon-sang soon falls in love with Yoo-jin, who opens her innocent heart to him. One fateful day, when Joon-sang pays a visit to Yoo-jin's house, he comes across a photo in their photo album. Their love, however, is cut short after Joon-sang is badly injured in a car accident and, due to brain damage, sustains amnesia, unable to remember anything prior to his accident.

Joon-sang's mother, yearning for Joon-sang's love and respect, has Joon-sang brainwashed by a hypnotist hoping to erase Joon-sang's memories of his painful childhood as an illegitimate child. As a result, Joon-sang's memories prior to the accident are erased. Joon-sang's mother decides to move to the United States with Joon-sang, where he can start a new life under the identity of Lee Min-hyung. His friends and teachers are told that Joon-sang is dead.

Ten years later, Min-hyung is an award-winning architect in the United States. He does not remember anything about his life in Korea. He is completely different, now an open-minded person who cares about other people. He returns to Korea and Yoo-jin sees him on the street, prompting her to put off her engagement to her childhood friend Sang-hyuk (Park Yong-ha). Little does she know that Min-hyung is dating her friend and past rival Chae-rin (Park Sol-mi). The story's plot thickens when Yoo-jin's interior design firm is awarded a project by Min-hyung's architectural firm, and has to work with Min-hyung. Yoo-jin sometimes wonders if he is her supposedly dead first love Joon-sang.

After a few months, Min-hyung also falls in love with Yoo-jin, fueling the anger of Chae-rin. Chae-rin sees Yoo-jin as a third wheel and attempts to draw Min-hyung's attention back to herself by lying about Yoo-jin. However, her plan is exposed when Min-hyung accidentally overhears a conversation between Chae-rin and Jin-sook.

== Cast ==
- Bae Yong-joon as Kang Joon-sang / Lee Min-hyung
- Choi Ji-woo as Jeong Yoo-jin
- Park Yong-ha as Kim Sang-hyuk
- Park Sol-mi as Oh Chae-rin
- Lee Hye-eun as Kong Jin-sook
- Ryu Seung-soo as Kwon Yong-gook
- Kwon Hae-hyo as Kim seonbae
- Song Ok-sook as Kang Mi-hee, Joon-sang's mother
- Jung Dong-hwan as Kim Jin-woo, Sang-hyuk's father
- Kim Hae-sook as Lee Yeong-hee, Yoo-jin's mother
- Ha Ji-hye as Jeong Hee-jin, Yoo-jin's younger sister
- Jung Won-joong as Park Jong-ho, "Gargamel"
- Jang Hang-sun as Supervisor Min
- Lee Hyo-chun as Park Ji-young, Sang-hyuk's mother
- Park Hyun-sook as Lee Jeong-ah, Yoo-jin's colleague at Polaris
- Son Jong-bum as Yoo-jin's colleague at Polaris
- Yoo Yul as Radio broadcaster
- Maeng Ho-rim as Dr. Ahn
- Ha Jae-young as Jeong Hyeon-soo, Yoo-jin's father

== Reception ==
Winter Sonata is credited with causing the second wave of the Korean Wave and extending it to Japan and the Philippines. It improved the image of South Korea among the Japanese and set fashion trends throughout East Asia. The series was a commercial success; 330,000 DVDs and 1,200,000 copies of Winter Sonata novelizations were sold. The series yielded more than US$27 billion when taking into account the profit it contributed to tourism. The number of visitors to the island of Namiseom (where the series was shot) grew from 250,000 to over 650,000 after the series was aired. A statue of the main characters can also be found on the island at the spot where they first kissed.

The series shot actor Bae Yong-joon into stardom in Asia, and he became especially popular among middle-aged Japanese women. When he first visited Japan in 2004, more than 3,000 women guarded by 350 policemen gathered at the airport to welcome him. Junichiro Koizumi, the Japanese prime minister at the time, was quoted saying that Bae was more popular in Japan than himself.

The series was also aired in the Philippines in 2003, via GMA Network's primetime block under the title Endless Love II: Winter Sonata and one of the highest rated shows at that time. As a result, it also brought the Korean Wave to the Philippines. Just like in Japan, Bae Yong-joon became popular among middle-aged women.

The series was a success in Asia and the America as well.

In March 2026, It was made public that the drama will be re-released in Japan by compiling the 1400‑minute Television series into a 2 hour 4K remastered film.

== Ratings ==
In this table, the blue numbers represent the lowest ratings and the red numbers represent the highest ratings.

Ep.	Original broadcast date	Average audience share
Ep.	Original broadcast date	AGB Nielsen
Ep.	Original broadcast date	Nationwide
1	January 14, 2002	16.3%
2	January 15, 2002	16.6%
3	January 21, 2002	19.2%
4	January 22, 2002	21.5%
5	January 28, 2002	21.2%
6	January 29, 2002	24.1%
7	February 4, 2002	27.2%
8	February 5, 2002	26.3%
9	February 11, 2002	17.8%
10	February 12, 2002	16.7%
11	February 18, 2002	26.4%
12	February 19, 2002	27.0%
13	February 25, 2002	27.6%
14	February 26, 2002	28.8%
15	March 4, 2002	26.4%
16	March 5, 2002	26.4%
17	March 11, 2002	23.3%
18	March 12, 2002	22.4%
19	March 18, 2002	23.7%
20	March 19, 2002	24.5%
Average		23.1%

== Original soundtrack ==
#	Title	Artist	Notes
1	처음부터 지금까지 (From the Beginning Until Now)	Ryu	
2	"My Memory"	Ryu	
3	처음 (First Time)		
4	그대만이 (Only You)	Ryu	
5	처음부터 지금까지 (From the Beginning Until Now)		Instrumental version
6	"My Memory"		Piano and violin version
7	보낼 수 없는 사랑 (The Love I Cannot Send)	Kim Wan-sun	
8	시작 (The Beginning)		
9	그대만이 (Only You)		Piano and violin version
10	"My Memory"		Piano version
11	잊지마 (Don't Forget)	Ryu	
12	기억속으로 (Inside the Memories)		
13	연인 (Lover)	Ryu	
14	제비꽃 (Violet)	Ryu	
15	그대만이 (Only You)		Piano version
16	처음 (First Time)		Piano version
17	제비꽃 (Violet)		Instrumental version
18	"Love Hurts"	Yiruma	Ep. 1
19	"When The Love Falls"	Yiruma	Ep. 2

In addition, "Moment" performed by Ryu and available on his album Ryu 2 is included on some bootleg versions of the Winter Sonata soundtrack.

== International broadcast ==
The drama first aired in Japan on NHK in 2004; it was dubbed in Japanese and edited into 60-minute episodes. The final episode (which aired on August 23, 2004) recorded ratings of 20.6% in Kanto, 22.5% in Nagoya, and 23.8% in the Kansai regions. The series as a whole had an average viewership in the 14% to 15% range. Due to overwhelming demand from viewers to watch the series in its original format, it was re-aired on NHK's satellite channel BS2 unedited (in its original Korean audio, with Japanese subtitles), beginning December 20, 2004.

It was the first Korean drama that ushered in the Korean Wave in Malaysia, when it aired in 2002 on TV3 dubbed in Mandarin with Malay subtitles. PMP Entertainment later released the drama in VCD and DVD format under the Bahasa title, Kisah Cinta Musim Salju (meaning "Winter Love Story"). A Malay cover version of the theme song was released with the title "Sonata Musim Salju" (meaning "Winter's Sonata").

The drama aired in Nepal on Kantipur Television Network in the mid-2000s dubbed in Nepali. The drama triggered the Korean Wave in the country and its lead star Bae Yong-joon became very popular amongst women in the country.

In Indonesia, Winter Sonata was broadcast on SCTV in August 2002.

In Vietnam, Winter Sonata was broadcast on HTV7 and HanoiTV in 2003. It was also broadcast on VTV2 in November 2013.

In 2006, pan-Asian American network AZN Television bought the rights to air Winter Sonata in a 24-hour marathon with other Korean dramas.

In Asia, the drama is available to stream via Iflix with English, Indonesian, Malay, Simplified Mandarin, Sinhalese, Vietnamese and Burmese subtitles.

== Anime ==
An anime adaptation of Winter Sonata premiered on Japan's SKY PerfecTV! on October 17, 2009, consisting of 26 episodes subtitled in Japanese and English. Directed by Ahn Jae-hoon and written by Kim Hyeong-wan, the program featured 23 members of the original Korean cast voicing the characters, including Bae and Choi who reprised their roles. The role of "Sang-hyuk", originally played by Park Yong-ha, was voiced by singer Kang Yo-hwan and "Chae-rin" was dubbed by newcomer Lee Se-na in place of Park Sol-mi. During October 2011, Animax Asia aired the anime in Korean audio and English subtitles across South and Southeast Asia.

=== Voice cast ===
==== Korean version ====
- Bae Yong-joon as Kang Joon-sang / Lee Min-hyung
- Choi Ji-woo as Jeong Yoo-jin
- Park Yong Ha as Kim Sang-hyuk
- Park Sol Mi as Oh Chae-rin
- Ryu Seung-soo as Kwon Yong-gook
- Seon Jeon-hui as Kong Jin-sook, Catalina and Marianne
- Bae Han-seon as Kim Jin-woo (Sang-hyuk's father)
- So Hye-jyeon as Kang Mi-hee (Joon-sang's mother) and Anne
- Yoon So-ra as Kim Yeong-hee (Yoo-jin's mother) and Mother superior
- Lee Young-yoo as Jeong Hee-jin (Yoo-jin's younger sister)
- Lee Jang-won as Park Jong-ho (teacher)
- Choi Seon-woo as Park Ji-young (Sang-hyuk's mother)
- Min-ji as Lee Jeong-ah
- Park Yeong-jae as Hang Seung-ryong and DJ (Sang-hyuk's colleague)
- Kim Chang as Kim Hyo-sook (Min-hyung's seonbae) and Jeong Hyeon-soo (Yoo-jin's father)
- Kim Gyu-sik as Dr. Ahn
- Seo-yeong as Jane
- Cho Gyun-joon as Manager Kim (Mi-hee's manager)
- Im Chae-hong as Claude
- Nam Do-hyeong as Louis
- Hong Seong-min as Chang
- Kim In-jeong as Manufacturing manager

==== Japanese version ====
- Masato Hagiwara as Kang Joon-sang / Lee Min-hyung
- Misato Tanaka as Jeong Yoo-jin
- Kazuma Horie as Kim Sang-hyuk
- Sayaka Kinoshita as Oh Chae-rin
- Fuminori Komatsu as Kwon Yong-gook
- Makoto Tsumura as Kong Jin-sook
- Mitsuru Takakuwa as Kim Jin-woo, Sang-hyuk's father
- Chika Mizuno as Kang Mi-hee, Joon-sang's mother
- Kaoru Katakai as Kim Yeong-hee, Yoo-jin's mother
- Michiko Komatsu as Jeong Hee-jin, Yoo-jin's younger sister
- Binbin Takaoka as Park Jong-ho, teacher
- Kikue Umimoto as Park Ji-young, Sang-hyuk's mother
- Tatsuya Kamijo as Radio DJ
- Aki Yasunaga as Lee Jeong-ah
- Seiro Ogino as Kim Hyo-sook, Min-hyung's seonbae
- Yasuhiro Mamiya as Dr. Ahn
- Kumi Tanaka as Jane
- Katsunori Kobayashi as Manager Kim, Mi-hee's manager
- Kenji Sugimura as Claude
- Ryo Agawa as Anne
- Yūto Suzuki as Louis
- Masanori Machida as Chang
- Koki Yamada as Manufacturing manager
- Kanako Hirano as Catalina
- Sayuri Sadaoka as Mother superior
- Rinko Hayashi as Marianne
- Keiichi Nakagawa as Jeong Hyeon-soo, Yoo-jin's father

=== Episode list ===
Episode	Broadcast date	Title
0		"Prologue"
1	October 17, 2009	"Black and White Photo"
2	October 24, 2009	"Kingdom of Shadows"
3	October 31, 2009	"First Time"
4	November 7, 2009	"The Promise That Couldn't Be Kept"
5	November 14, 2009	"Was Seeing You Just A Dream?"
6	November 21, 2009	"The Woman Who Can't Forget Her First Love"
7	November 28, 2009	"The Man Who Can't Remember Her"
8	December 5, 2009	"Lie"
9	December 12, 2009	"Me, Inside the Forgotten Time"
10	December 19, 2009	"Me, Inside the Forgotten Time Part 2"
11	December 26, 2009	"When First Love Call On Me Again"
12	January 9, 2010	"A Love That's Waited Ten Years"
13	January 16, 2010	"An Empty Name"
14	January 23, 2010	"Polaris"
15	January 30, 2010	"The Last Fragment of Memory"
16	February 13, 2010	"The Last Fragment of Memory Part 2"
17	February 20, 2010	"Our First and Our Last Ocean"
18	February 27, 2010	"Everything Disappears as Winter Fades Away"
19	March 6, 2010	"As Tears Go By"
20	March 13, 2010	"The Impossible House"
21	March 21, 2010	"The Traveler's Heart, Renewed"
22	March 28, 2010	"First Love"
23	April 10, 2010	"First Love Part 2"
24	April 17, 2010	"A Winter Shade of Pale"
25	April 24, 2010	"From the Beginning Until Now"
26	May 1, 2010	"Hidden Track-Eternal Love"

=== Soundtrack ===
==== Version 1 ====
1. 最初から今まで (From the Beginning Until Now) - instrumental 2009
2. サラハムニダ:初めて2 (Sarahamnida:First Time 2)
3. たった一歩だけでも (Only One Step Alone)
4. いつでもただ君だけを (Forever for Her) - Lee Se-jun (Ending)
5. 聞きなれない声 (Not Used To Hearing Voice)
6. 凍りついた視線 (Frozen Eye)
7. To My Dearest
8. サラハムニダ:初めて2 (New Age ver.) (Sarahamnida:First Time 2 New Age ver.)
9. 逢いたい (I Miss You) - Yoo Hae-joon
10. Mystery Episodes
11. 氷の湖 (Ice Lake)
12. RUN
13. ソナタ(恋歌) - Kang Yo-hwan
14. 最初から今まで (From the Beginning Until Now) - Ryu (Opening)

==== Version 2 ====
1. 雪の森 (Snow Wood)
2. サラハムニダ:初めて2 (Humming ver.) (Sarahamnida:First Time 2 Humming ver.)
3. 届かない想い (Feelings Do Not Receive) - Kang Yo-hwan
4. 真冬の散歩道 (Winter Walking Road)
5. 記憶と願い (Memory and Wish)
6. 踊らないオルゴール (Music Box Do Not Dance)
7. サラハムニダ:初めて2 (Clarinet ver.) (Sarahamnida:First Time 2 Clarinet ver.)
8. Polaris
9. 思い出づくり (Making Memory)
10. Invisible Love
11. サラハムニダ:初めて2 (Classic ver.) (Sarahamnida:First Time 2 Classic ver.)
12. ソナタ(恋歌)(Strings Inst ver.) (Sonata Strings Inst ver.)
13. 君と永遠に (With You Forever) - Shin Min-chul (T-Max)
14. Believe You - Yoonji

=== Documentary cast (episode 26) ===
- Bae Yong-joon as Kang Joon-sang
- Choi Ji-woo as Jeong Yoo-jin
- Kang Yo-hwan as Kim Sang-hyuk
- Lee Se-na as Oh Chae-rin
- Ryu Seung-soo as Kwon Yong-gook
- Seon Jeon-hui as Kong Jin-sook

== Musical theater ==
Winter Sonata marked its 10th year milestone with a staging of a new musical adaptation that ran from September 27, 2011 to March 18, 2012. Yoon Seok-ho was the producer and art director, with stage direction by Yoo Hee-sung (Mozart!, Pimagol Love Song) and musical score by Oh Eun-hee (Dae Jang Geum, Singin' in the Rain). The leading role of Yoo-jin was portrayed by musical actress Choi Soo-jin.

The Winter Sonata musical first premiered in 2006 in several cities in Japan, including Sapporo, Tokyo and Osaka, and popular crossover tenor Im Tae-kyung drew crowds. It also completed a run in Busan and Seoul, from late 2010 to early 2011, with stage direction by Im Do-wan (Woyzeck) and musical score by Lee Ji-soo.

=== Cast ===
==== 2006 ====
- Im Tae-kyung and Lee Sang-hyeon as Kang Joon-sang / Lee Min-hyung
- Park Hong-joo and Im Kang-hee as Jeong Yoo-jin
- Lee Pil-sung as Kim Sang-hyuk
- Jiny as Oh Chae-rin
- Lee Jin-kyu as Kwon Yong-gook
- Kim Gyung-hwa as Kong Jin-sook
- Shin Bok-ja as Kang Mi-hee, Joon-sang's mother
- Yang Joon-mo as Spirit
- Nam Moon-chul as Dr. Oh, Chae-rin's father

==== 2011 ====
- Kim Tae-han as Kang Joon-sang / Lee Min-hyung
- Park Woo-ne and Choi Soo-jin as Jeong Yoo-jin
- Jeong Jae-hong and Kim Gyeong-soo as Kim Sang-hyuk

=== Soundtrack ===
==== 2006 ====
#	Title	Artist
1	"Overture"	
2	"Endless Song"	Park Hong-joo
3	"My Great Proposal"	Lee Pil-sung
4	"I Will Be Always Waiting For You"	Lee Pil-sung
5	"I'm Your Girl"	Jiny
6	"Confusion"	Lee Sang-hyeon
7	"Light Of The Life"	Shin Bok-ja
8	"Is This Love"	Im Tae-kyung
9	"Can't Love Another Day + I Won't Alone"	Lee Sang-hyeon
10	"For Your Memory"	Im Tae-kyung
11	"Now I Remember"	Im Tae-kyung
12	"Eternal Love"	Lee Sang-hyeong
13	"Missing You"	Lee Pil-sung
14	"Remember"	Lee Sang-hyeon
15	"My Memory"	Im Tae-kyung

== Manga ==
A Japanese comic has also been published of this story, using photos of the series as covers.

Issue	ISBN	Publish date
1	4-7767-1329-2	July 8, 2004
2	4-7767-1330-6	July 8, 2004
3	4-7767-1331-4	August 20, 2004
4	4-7767-1416-7	October 20, 2004
5	4-7767-1449-3	December 20, 2004
6	4-7767-1555-4	March 1, 2005
7	4-7767-1584-8	April 28, 2005
8	4-7767-1655-0	June 30, 2005

== Video games ==
Two pachinko simulation games called Pachitte Chonmage Tatsujin 10: Pachinko Fuyu no Sonata and Pachitte Chonmage Tatsujin 15: Pachinko Fuyu no Sonata 2 were made by Hack Berry and released on January 25, 2007 and December 25, 2008, respectively and for the PlayStation 2.

A Nintendo DSi enhanced title, called Fuyu no Sonata DS was released in Japan by D3Publisher on December 17, 2009.

== In popular culture ==
In episode 5 of Da Capo II's first season (aired October 29, 2007), two main characters go to a movie called Fuyu no Anata (冬のアナタ), which is clearly Fuyu no Sonata (both share the same font and characters). One of the Fuyu no Anata posters visible in the Da Capo anime episode looks exactly like the first Fuyu no Sonata manga cover. The Japanese anime Kaguya-sama: Love Is War has a soundtrack adapted from one of the soundtracks by the Korean drama.

In the Family Guy episode Candy, Quahog Marshmallow, Peter, Cleveland and Joe become obsessed with a Korean drama called Winter Summer, a parody of Winter Sonata.

== Awards and nominations ==
Year	Award	Category	Nominated work	Result
2002	38th Baeksang Arts Awards	Best TV Director	Yoon Seok-ho	Won
2002	38th Baeksang Arts Awards	Most Popular Actor (TV)	Bae Yong-joon	Won
2002	38th Baeksang Arts Awards	Most Popular Actress (TV)	Choi Ji-woo	Won
2002	KBS Drama Awards	Top Excellence Award, actor	Bae Yong-joon	Won
2002	KBS Drama Awards	Top Excellence Award, Actress	Choi Ji-woo	Won
2002	10th Korean Most Popular Entertainment Awards	Best Actor (TV)	Bae Yong-joon	Won
2013	10th Anniversary of Korean Entertainment in Japan Awards	Grand Prize (Daesang)	Bae Yong-joon	Won
2013	10th Anniversary of Korean Entertainment in Japan Awards	Best Actor	Bae Yong-joon	Won
