= First Love (Yiruma album) =

Studio album by Yiruma
- Released: December 1, 2001
- Recorded: 2001
- Length: 55:49
- Label: Stomp Music; Sony Music Korea

Yiruma chronology
Love Scene (2001)	First Love (2001)	Oasis & Yiruma (2002)

First Love is the second studio album by South Korean pianist Yiruma, released in 2001.

The best known track in the album is "River Flows in You", which became popular after it was associated with a different song, "Bella's Lullaby", from the film Twilight (2008). The song reached No. 20 in Germany and No. 11 in Austria, and its video received over 200 million views on YouTube.

The album reached No. 3 on Billboard's Top Classical Albums in 2020 after a change in chart rules allowing catalog albums to be included in current charts.

== Track listing ==
First Love track listing
No.	Title	Writer(s)	Length
1.	"I"		4:10
2.	"May Be"		4:00
3.	"Love Me"		4:06
4.	"River Flows in You"		3:10
5.	"Passing By"		4:37
6.	"It's Your Day"		3:41
7.	"When the Love Falls"	Michel Polnareff	3:18
8.	"Left My Hearts"		3:12
9.	"Time Forgets..."		4:58
10.	"On the Way"		4:39
11.	"Till I Find You"		3:44
12.	"If I Could See You Again"		3:25
13.	"Dream a Little Dream of Me"	Fabian Andre and Wilbur Schwandt	2:12
14.	"I..."		3:11
15.	"Farewell"		2:29

== Charts ==
Chart performance for First Love
Chart	Peak position
South Korean Albums (Gaon)	67
US New Age Albums (Billboard)	4
US Top Classical Albums (Billboard)	3
US Top Classical Crossover Albums (Billboard)	9
