= Hansel and Gretel (2007 film) =

- Theatrical release poster
- Hangul: 헨젤과 그레텔
- RR: Henjelgwa Geuretel
- MR: Henjelgwa Kŭret'el
- Directed by: Yim Pil-sung
- Written by: Kim Min-sook; Yim Pil-sung
- Produced by: Choi Jae-won; Seo Woo-sik
- Starring: Chun Jung-myung; Eun Won-jae; Shim Eun-kyung; Jin Ji-hee
- Cinematography: Kim Ji-yong
- Edited by: Kim Sun-min
- Music by: Lee Byung-woo
- Distributed by: CJ Entertainment
- Release date: December 27, 2007
- Running time: 117 minutes
- Country: South Korea
- Language: Korean
- Box office: $2.2 million

Hansel and Gretel is a 2007 South Korean dark fantasy horror film directed by Yim Pil-sung, starring Chun Jung-myung, Eun Won-jae, Shim Eun-kyung and Jin Ji-hee.

== Plot ==
Eun-soo, a salesman, is driving his car along Highway 69 while arguing with his pregnant girlfriend, Hae-young, on the phone. The argument leads to a car crash. He wakes up in a dark forest and meets a young girl, Young-hee, who takes him to her house, called the 'House of Happy Children.' He meets her parents, her older brother Man-bok, and younger sister Jung-soon there. He tries to leave, but the children follow his every move. The parents go out, leaving him to take care of the kids.

To his surprise, he finds the real mother hiding in the attic. She tells him that the couple are not the children's real parents. Their car broke down on Highway 69, and they met Jung-soon in a similar way. She warns him not to believe the children. Man-bok brings a couple to the house: the man, Byun, is a friendly deacon. Eun-soo discovers that the meat they've eaten is actually from the flesh of the missing father, whose wife has been turned into a china doll. He also notices that Byun's wife has disappeared after accusing Jung-soon of stealing her ring. He secretly follows Man-bok into the woods, while keeping a trail of breadcrumbs to avoid getting lost. He discovers Byun's wife has been turned into an oak tree.

Man-bok stops before a mysterious door, and his face changes to an old man's. When he leaves, Eun-soo enters the room and looks over the notebook the siblings have worked on for a long time. He realizes that the children are over thirty years old. He learns that Man-bok has the power of telekinesis and can make people do things by imagining the actions: he is the one who turned the women into a china doll and oak tree earlier. When Eun-soo sees his drawing in the notebook, he becomes determined to stop the children before they murder him. Back at the house, he discovers that Byun is a religious cult leader trying to kill the children. He knocks Byun out and listens to the children's side of the story from Young-hee.

The kids used to live in an orphanage called the 'House of Happy Children,' where the abusive caretaker raped the girls and beat the boys. Man-bok discovered his powers during Christmas when he made Santa Claus appear. Santa told the siblings of their powers and gave them a Hansel and Gretel storybook. After they witnessed their friend Seung-ho being beaten to death, they wished to stop the caretaker, only to find everyone dead and the caretaker about to burn them in the fireplace. Man-bok used his power to kill the caretaker. Now, the children use their powers to make Byun kill himself when he rises to kill Eun-soo.

The children ask Eun-soo to stay with them. However, Eun-soo wishes to reunite with his loved ones and offers to take them with him instead. They refuse, convinced that adults will always be bad. Eun-soo argues that they will be the same if they continue their behaviours. Young-hee tells him to burn the notebook so he can leave, and he does so before Man-bok can stop him. Eun-soo then wakes up where he first met Young-hee. He walks to the road and meets the police. They tell him the tragic stories of Highway 69 as they are amazed at how he has survived.

A year later, on Christmas, Eun-soo has married Hae-young, and they have a baby boy. As he goes out to buy milk, he wonders if that encounter was only a dream. His collection of news clippings of the missing Byun (revealed to be a serial killer) suggests it is real. He comes across the children's notebook. The pages are all blank except the last one, which shows the three children holding hands and smiling. They have given up and realized they don't need parents to be a family. Eun-soo looks out the window to the snow outside. Man-bok, Young-hee, and Jung-soon go back into the woods.

== Cast and characters ==
- Chun Jung-myung as Lee Eun-soo

The protagonist of the story. Gets into a car accident and was found by one of the children in the nearby woods and taken to their home. He told the children how much he loved them and he wanted to stay, but his pregnant girlfriend and sick mother needed him. The movie centers around him trying to leave, and the events that keep him from going back home.

- Eun Won-jae as Kim Man-bok

He is the oldest of the children, an antagonist of the film. He'd lived with his sisters in the house since he was 5, and because his father used to beat him up, he's still a bit gloomy. He has the power to control things with his mind, or telekinesis. Each time he kills someone, he draws the death of the person in detail in his notebook. He always has a mysterious aura and a very bad temper. Throughout the movie, Man-bok appears to be a 13-year-old. But apparently, as Eun-soo found out in an old book, he was born in 1959.

- Shim Eun-kyung as Kim Young-hee

She was the one who found Eun-soo. She has a tendency to keep Man-bok from getting too angry. She and her sister tried to run away from the orphanage but came back because they couldn't get out. She often sleepwalks and one time in her sleep, she told Eun-soo, "He always tells me that I'm pretty..." referring to the "Father" of the orphanage who would to rape young girls, like her. Young-hee was born in 1960, a year younger than Man-bok.

- Jin Ji-hee as Kim Jung-soon

She's 7 years old when they killed the caretaker, and was told by every adult that she was a bit weak. She hates grown-ups. Although she liked to laugh and play with her dolls, she always tortured them. She can bring imaginary things to life, much like her brother can. When Eun-soo told them a story about fairies, she put down a doll and suddenly it came to alive and flew to the sky. She and Young-hee could see it, but Eun-soo didn't notice it at all, suggesting that adults are unable to see things like this. According to her file, Jung-soon was born in 1965.

- Park Hee-soon as Deacon Byun

Another antagonist of the story. He and his wife get lost in the woods, eventually meeting Man-bok. He appears to be friendly, but is revealed to be a leader of a religious cult and a serial killer. He thought the children were Satan's children and he attempts to kill them. It turned out when he was younger, he killed his own father, stating "I sent my father to heaven" as he put it. He slit his throat when the three children use their telekinesis to get him to kill himself.

- Lydia Park as Kyung-sook

Byun's wife, who intended to take away the children's jewelry. After she blamed Jung-soon for her lost jewelry, Man-bok turned her into an oak tree.

- Jang Young-nam as Soo-jung ("Mother")
- Kim Kyung-ik as Young-shik ("Father")
- Go Joon-hee as Hae-young

== Festivals ==
- Puchon International Fantastic Film Festival 2008 - Special Mention from the European Federation of Fantastic Film Festivals Jury
- Vancouver International Film Festival - Closing film, Dragons and Tigers section
- Sitges Film Festival 2008 - Nominated, Best Film
- London Film Festival 2008
- Gérardmer Film Festival 2009 - Nominated, Grand Prize Competition
- Fantasporto 2009
- Calgary Underground Film Festival 2009
- Dublin International Film Festival 2010

== International release ==
- United Kingdom: January 16, 2009
- Canada: March 6, 2009 (Quebec & Montréal); March 27, 2009 (Toronto); April 24, 2009 (Vancouver)
- France: April 1, 2009
