= Han Na-na =

South Korean actress (born 1979)

- Born: Han Na-na; 30 January 1979 (age 47); Seoul, South Korea
- Other names: Hannah, Hannah Na, Hanna, Nana, Hannana
- Education: Michigan State University (Bachelor of Arts)
- Occupations: Actress; model
- Years active: 1999–present
- Agent: Media Dream Entertainment
- Known for: Autumn in My Heart; Love Wind Love Song

Han Na-na (born January 30, 1979) is a South Korean actress, model and beauty pageant titleholder. She is known for her role in Autumn in My Heart as Shin Yoo-mi. She also appeared in the movie, Love Wind Love Song.

== Early life and education ==
She was born on January 30, 1979, in South Korea. Since childhood, she loved dancing and learned ballet in elementary school and won many competitions at a very young age. She went abroad to study Ballet in Boston Ballet School, but due to knee injury she had to leave dance. She completed her studies from Michigan State University and joined Media Dream Entertainment.

== Career ==
In 1999, she made her acting debut in the movie, Love Wind Love Song and that year won the Miss Korea pageant as 1st runner-up. In 2000, she appeared in the music video, "You Know" by Jo Sung-mo. The same year she landed her first main role in a television series in the KBS2 drama Autumn in My Heart, appearing alongside Song Hye-kyo, Won Bin, and Song Seung-heon.

== Filmography ==
=== Television series ===
Year	Title	Role	Network	Ref.
2000	Autumn in My Heart	Shin Yoo-mi	KBS2	

=== Film ===
Year	Title	Role	Ref.
1999	Love Wind Love Song	Employee Han	

=== Music video appearances ===
Year	Title	Artist
2000	"You Know"	Jo Sung-mo

== Awards and nominations ==
- 1999 Miss Korea Seoul: 1st runner-up
- 1999 The 43rd Miss Korea: 1st runner-up
