= Eun Won-jae =

South Korean actor

- Born: July 21, 1994 (age 32); South Korea
- Occupation: Actor
- Years active: 2000–present

Korean name
- Hangul: 은원재
- RR: Eun Wonjae
- MR: Ŭn Wŏnjae

Eun Won-jae (born July 21, 1994) is a South Korean actor.

== Filmography ==
=== Film ===
Year	Title	Role
2002	2009 Lost Memories	
2002	Marrying the Mafia	Jang Young-min
2003	Natural City	Yang
2006	Maundy Thursday	teenage Jung Yun-soo
2007	Hansel and Gretel	Kim Man-bok

=== Television series ===
Year	Title	Role	Network
2001	Outing		SBS
2004	Oolla Boolla Blue-jjang	Woo Joo-seon (Prince Black Stone)	KBS2
2005	Fashion 70s	young Jang Bin	SBS
2006	Spring Waltz	young Lee Soo-ho	KBS2
2006	Yeon Gaesomun	teenage Yeon Gaesomun	SBS
2012	I Need a Fairy	Shin Joo-seok	KBS2

== Awards and nominations ==
Year	Award	Category	Nominated work	Result
2006	KBS Drama Awards	Best Young Actor	Spring Waltz	Nominated
2008	7th Korean Film Awards	Best New Actor	Hansel and Gretel	Nominated
