= Doggy Poo =

- Directed by: Kwon Oh-sung
- Starring: Anna Desmarais; Tony Ruse; Josh Smith; Fiona Stuart; Kate Yoon
- Music by: Yiruma
- Release date: 2003
- Running time: 34 minutes
- Country: South Korea
- Languages: Korean; English

Doggy Poo (Korean: 강아지 똥; RR: Gangaji ttong) is a 34-minute stop-motion-animated film from South Korea, directed by Kwon Oh-sung, based on Kwon Jung-saeng's 1968 children's book Doggy Poo, illustrated by Annie Rose Godsman. Doggy Poo is a short story written in 1968. In the same year, it received the 1st Children's Literature Award from the Monthly Christian Education.

There are both English and Korean language versions of the film.

== Plot ==
In the summer, a dog defecates on the side of a dirt road. The sentient pile of feces, Doggy Poo, is initially amazed by his new surroundings, but is soon rejected by a sparrow as disgusting. A nearby lump of soil ridicules Doggy Poo, who responds that the soil is ugly and mean. The soil apologizes and tells Doggy Poo of his past at a nearby farm where he grew tail flowers and potatoes each summer. The preceding day, the farmer scooped the soil onto his cart to build a house, but the lump of soil accidentally dropped onto the side of the road, leaving him to await another cart to run him over and end his life. The soil then sorrowfully vents his guilt over the death of some peppers in a drought, during which he had wished for the peppers' death for taking his scant amount of water. However, Doggy Poo reassures him that the peppers' death could not be helped.

As a cart approaches, the soil tells Doggy Poo that he must have been created for a reason. The cart turns out to be the one from which the soil was originally dropped, and the farmer returns him to the cart. Autumn comes, and although Doggy Poo is grateful for the soil's fortune, he is left lonely, uncertain of his purpose and fearful of the ambiance of nighttime. A leaf blows into Doggy Poo's vicinity and tells him that a leaf's fated detachment from its tree is a reflection of the inevitable and blameless nature of death, and that Doggy Poo is lucky to be able to stay in one spot whereas the leaf must go wherever the wind blows. The wind sends the leaf flying, leaving Doggy Poo to spend the winter alone and covered in snow.

In the spring, Doggy Poo is approached by a mother hen, who proposes that Doggy Poo could be lunch for her chicks. Although Doggy Poo is willing to give himself up for this use, the hen ultimately decides that Doggy Poo is unsatisfactory as a meal and leaves. During a rainfall, a dandelion sprout grows in front of Doggy Poo and tells him that she can become a beautiful flower if Doggy Poo gives his entire self to her as fertilizer. Overjoyed, Doggy Poo gives himself to the dandelion, whose achenes scatter in the wind.

== English-language cast ==
- Fiona Stuart as Doggy Poo
- Josh Smith as Soil
- Kate Yoon as Leaf
- Tony Ruse as Farmer
- Anna Desmarais as Dandelion, Hen and Sparrow

== Critical reception ==
PopMatters described the film as "surprisingly watchable". The A.V. Club stated "For anyone above 4 years of age, Doggy Poo is a pretty crappy film." Total Film named one of the 50 Worst Kids Movies of all time, writing that it "Brings a whole new meaning to the phrase 'what a piece of shit'."

== Awards ==
- Best Pilot at the 2003 Tokyo International Anime Fair
- Viewer's Choice award at the 2003 Big Apple Anime Fest
