= Love Wind Love Song =

- Hangul: 연풍연가
- Hanja: 戀風戀歌
- RR: Yeonpungyeonga
- MR: Yŏnp'ungyŏn'ga
- Directed by: Park Dae-young
- Written by: Jo Myeong-joo
- Produced by: Koo Bon-han; Chang Yoon-hyun
- Starring: Jang Dong-gun; Ko So-young
- Cinematography: Kim Yung-chul
- Edited by: Kim Youn-hee
- Music by: Kim Youn-hee
- Distributed by: Q&C Film
- Release date: February 13, 1999 (South Korea)
- Running time: 98 minutes
- Country: South Korea
- Language: Korean

Love Wind Love Song (Korean: 연풍연가; RR: Yeonpungyeonga) is a 1999 South Korean romance film about a Seoul businessman (Jang Dong-gun) who comes to Jeju Island and meets a lonely tour guide (Ko So-young).

== Cast ==
- Jang Dong-gun as Tae-hee
- Ko So-young as Young-seo
- Park Jin-hee as Young-seo's friend
- Han Na-na as Employee Han
- Son Young-soon as a lost grandmother
- Lee Hyun as an English teacher
- Han Jae-suk as a movie star (cameo)

== OST ==
Love Wind Love Song [ost] OST

Soundtrack album by Various artists
- Released: 1998
- Genre: Soundtrack
- Length: 58:41
- Language: Korean

Released on 1998
No.	Title	Lyrics	Music	Artist	Length
1.	"Tropocal Island"
2.	"Love Wind Love Song (Our Love Like This)" (연풍연가 (우리 사랑 이대로))	Joo Young-hoon	Joo Young-hoon	Joo Young-hoon, Lee Hye-jin
3.	"The Blue Night of Jeju Island (Southern Mix)" (제주도의 푸른밤 (Southern Mix))		Choi Sung-won
4.	"Fantasy"
5.	"Ending"	Joo Young-hoon	Joo Young-hoon
6.	"The Blue Night of Jeju Island" (제주도의 푸른밤)	Choi Sung-won	Choi Sung-won	Lee Hye-jin
7.	"Love Wind"
8.	"Lover's Rhapsody"		Jeong Jin-su
9.	"Ending (Sax Mix)"		Joo Young-hoon
10.	"The Blue Night of Jeju Island (Smooth Mix)" (제주도의 푸른밤 (Smooth Mix))		Choi Sung-won
11.	"A Voice From Tropical Island"		Joo Young-hoon
12.	"Love Song"
13.	"영원히 함께"	Jeong Jin-su	Jeong Jin-su
14.	"The Blue Night of Jeju Island (Latin Mix)" (제주도의 푸른밤 (Latin Mix))		Choi Sung-won
15.	"Love Wind Love Song Theme" (연풍연가 Theme)		Joo Young-hoon

== Trivia ==
Lead actors Jang Dong-gun and Ko So-young married in 2010.
