= Endless Love (2000 TV series) =

- Directed by: Yoon Seok-ho
- Country of origin: South Korea
- Original language: Korean
- No. of seasons: 4
- No. of episodes: 76

Production
- Producer: Lee Jae-sang

Original release
- Network: Korean Broadcasting System
- Release: September 18, 2000 – May 16, 2006

Endless Love is the unofficial title for a set of four Korean drama series directed by Yoon Seok-ho, and produced by KBS from 2000 to 2006.

== Structure ==
It featured four parts, with each named after the seasons of the year. Each part of the series had its own plotlines, characters, and actors. The series was widely viewed in Asia and continued the Korean Wave that had gripped the region since the late 1990s and early 2000s. Later on, as the series progressed and was marketed outside of Korea, the moniker 'Endless Love' stuck and was used to identify all the series as one.

== Endless Love series ==
The series was widely known in South Korea as director Yoon Seok-ho's pet project, dealing with four different seasons of love. In Korea, however, it is not totally put together as a series but is arranged as four separate shows. All the seasons run 20 episodes except for the first which ran only 16 as they were shown on KBS2, in more than 76 episodes. The show's endings not only have evolved with the times (tragedy used to be the trend, but now lighter, happier endings are preferred), but have kept with the theme, getting progressively more positive as 'spring' approaches. A few of the actors who portray the show's supporting characters return in different roles as the series progressed, such as Kim Hae-sook, but only Song Seung-heon played two different characters, both as leads for Autumn and Summer.

Here are the four parts of the 'series':

- Autumn in My Heart
- Winter Sonata
- Summer Scent
- Spring Waltz

== Running similarities ==
Many elements of the 'formula' of Korean drama are evident in the shows but are retained even more clearly in all four shows.

The shows mainly begin with a love that begins at some point in the early childhood or teen years and continues on until adulthood, usually after a long separation. This is slightly bent in the 3rd series as the main character's first loves are not the main characters, but still goes by 'first love' involving the heart of the main male character's first girlfriend having been transplanted onto the main female lead.

The shows also seem to emphasize the scenery, making it into one of the main characters (the rice fields in Autumn, the lake in Winter, the tea garden in Summer and the island in Spring).

The show also follows a pattern of having a 'third-wheel', the second male lead; and the jealous girl, the second female lead. There was also a 3rd 'couple' in each show, mostly to provide comic relief from the otherwise dreary situations presented in each show (leading to 3 couples- the leads, the second leads and the 'funny' couple).

Also, all the characters in all the series have had the leads endure the disagreement of the parents of both leads. As for the soundtrack, main instrumental themes for all the series are known classics such as 'Romance' in Autumn, 'Moonlight Sonata' in Winter, 'Serenade' in Summer and 'Clementine' in Spring.

== Broadcasting outside Korea ==
- In the Philippines, Endless Love: Autumn in My Heart became a tearful and heart-touching drama. This drama received much positive feedback. Also the main actor and actress' of the first series garnered positive comments from people. Endless Love II: Winter Sonata and Endless Love III: Summer Scent also aired on GMA Network, while Endless Love IV: Spring Waltz aired on ABS-CBN as Spring Waltz (without the Endless Love title) and also came out with a DVD Boxset containing all episodes Tagalog Dubbed. Endless Love, which was the first adaptation of the first series installment of the same title, spanned a remake in 2010 after the original series aired 10 years back it marked the 60 years of GMA Network then it became a rerun after 11 years in 2021 during the COVID-19 pandemic in the Philippines. The series featured Dingdong Dantes as Johnny and Marian Rivera as Jenny which also became a hit through its initial run.
- In Indonesia, the serial was officially broadcast as Endless Love: Autumn in My Heart such:
  - Indosiar (2002)
    - Start aired: Monday, 1 July 2002
    - End aired: Wednesday, 7 August 2002
    - Monday and Tuesday at 18:00-19:00 WIB/19:00-20:00 WITA.
  - RCTI (2003–2004)
    - Live:
      - Start aired: Chinese New Year 2003
      - End aired: Sunday, 11 May 2003
      - Weekends at 15:00-16:00 WIB/16:00-17:00 WITA/17:00-18:00 WIT.
    - Rerun:
      - Start aired: Tuesday, 16 November 2004
      - End aired: Thursday, 23 December 2004
      - Weekdays at 18:00-19:00 WIB/19:00-20:00 WITA/20:00-21:00 WIT.
  - Deli TV Medan (2006)
    - Start aired: Monday, 1 May 2006
    - End aired: Wednesday, 9 June 2006
    - Weekdays at 20:00-21:00 WIB.
    - Dubbed (Audio): Korean.
    - Subtitle (Captions): Indonesian.
  - ANTV (2012)
    - Start aired: Monday, 29 October 2012
    - End aired: Friday, 7 December 2012
    - Weekdays at 20:30-21:30 WIB/21:30-22:30 WITA/22:30-23:30 WIT.
- In Puerto Rico, Endless Love II: Winter Sonata and Endless Love IV: Spring Waltz run with Spanish dubbing, and the two are currently being broadcast at the same time. They have gained much popularity with their viewers.

== Production and telecasting ==
Telecasting: KBS

- Executive Producer: Kim, Jong Sik
- Chief Producer: Moon, Bo Hyun
- Producer: Lee, Jae Sang

Production: YOON'S COLOR

- Director: Yoon Seok-ho

Distributor: YOON'S COLOR

== Soundtracks ==
=== Korean soundtracks ===
Autumn Tale soundtrack

Also includes a compact disc for another Korean KBS show - Fireworks. The main title and "Reason" have the same melody and are the dominant themes of the show. "Romance", also known as "Forbidden Love", is the classic piece used for this soundtrack.

1. Main Title (Flute ver.)
2. Reason - Jung Il-young
3. Romance - Choi Tae-won
4. Gi do (Prayer) - Jung Il-young
5. Remember - Park Jung-won
6. Uhl Ma Na Nae Ga (Sincerely) - Yoon Chang-gun
7. Reason (Instrumental ver.)
8. Romance (Piano ver.) - Lee Hong-rae
9. Noon Mool (Tears) - Lee Hong-rae
10. Uhl Ma Na Nae Ga (Sincerely) (Guitar ver.) - Guitar by Ham Choon-ho
11. Ggoom suhk ae suh (In my dream) - Jung Il-young
12. Uhl Ma Na Nae Ga (Sincerely) (Piano ver.) - Piano by Yoo Jung-young
13. Gi Do (Prayer) (Piano ver.)

Autumn Tale: Episode 1

1. Romance (Instrumental) - Choi Tae Wan
2. Sadness - Jung Chul In
3. Crying - Jung Chul In
4. Ja Jun Guh (Instrumental) - Jung Chul In
5. Chun Nyun Dong Ahn - Jung Chul In
6. I Love You, I Miss You, I Need You - Jung Chul In
7. Epilogue (Instrumental) - Jung Chul In
8. Nuh Eh Ge Mood Go Ship Eun Doo Ga Ji - Kim Soo Jin
9. Bi Ae (Instrumental) - Jung Chul In
10. Seul Peun Ye Gam - Lim Ok Moon
11. Ja Yoo Rob Ge - Jung Chul In
12. Sad Song - Kim Sang Hee, Kang Sung Gon
13. Cafe Christman - Kim Yo Seb
14. Gyuh Ool Ae Sang - Song Ji Hyun
15. Sadness (Instrumental) - Jung Chul In

Winter Sonata soundtrack

Predominantly features Ryu (류) as the official performer for Winter Sonata.

1. 처음부터 지금까지 Cheoeumbuteo Jigeumkkaji (From the Beginning Until Now) - performed by Ryu
2. "My Memory" - performed by Ryu
3. 처음 Cheoeum (First Time)
4. 그대만이 Geudaeman'i (Only You) - performed by Ryu
5. 처음부터 지금까지 Cheoeumbuteo Jigeumkkaji (From the Beginning Until Now) - instrumental version
6. "My Memory" - piano and violin version
7. 보낼 수 없는 사랑 Ponael Su Eobsneun Sarang (The Love I Can Not Send) - performed by Seon (선)
8. 시작 Shijak (The Beginning)
9. 그대만이 Geudaeman'i (Only You) - piano and violin version
10. "My Memory" - piano version
11. 잊지마 Itjima (Don't Forget) - performed by Ryu
12. 기억속으로 Gieoksog'euro (Inside the Memories)
13. 연인 Yeon'in (Lover) - performed by Ryu
14. 제비꽃 Jebikkoch (Violet) - performed by Ryu
15. 그대만이 Geudaeman'i (Only You) - piano version
16. 처음 Cheoeum (First Time) - piano version
17. 제비꽃 Jebikkoch (Violet) - instrumental

In addition, "Moment" performed by Ryu and available on his album Ryu 2 (류 2집) is included on some bootleg versions of the Winter Sonata soundtrack.

Winter Sonata Classics

1. Chuh eum boo tuh ji geum gga ji - Oh Suk Joon, Yoo Hae Joon
2. Tears In Your Eyes - Park Jung Won
3. My Memory (Violin Version) - Park Jung Won
4. Ye gam - Ho, Lee
5. Ha yan yun in deul - Francis Lai
6. Ah jik do - Lee Ji Soo
7. Missing You (Violin Version) - Ho, Lee
8. Sparks - Moszkowski
9. Goodbye My Love - Ho, Lee
10. My Memory (Piano Version) - Park Jung Won
11. Bit ba raen gi uk - Lee Ji Soo
12. Love Is Blue - Ho, Lee
13. Missing You (Piano Version) - Ho, Lee
14. Byul - Ha Kwang Suk
15. Let's Dream, Once Again - Ho, Lee

Winter Sonata Orgel Sound Collection

1. My Memory
2. Shi jak
3. Ah jik do
4. Chuh eum boo tuh ji geum gga ji
5. Goodbye My Love
6. Bit ba raen gi uk
7. Love Is Blue
8. Byul
9. Chuh eum
10. Je bi ggot
11. Moment
12. Geu dae man ee
13. Gi uk sok eu ro
14. Bo nael soo uhb neun sarang
15. It ji ma

Summer Scent soundtrack

The main title and Bi Mil are interchangeably used in different airings of the show as the main theme.

1. Main Title (Serenade)
2. Bi mil - Jung In Ho
3. Missing U - Seo Jin Young
4. Uh jjuh myun - Seo Jin Young
5. Yuh reum hyang gi - Jung In Ho
6. Serenade (Inst.) (Guitar)
7. Second Romance - Seo Jin Young
8. Yuh reum hyang gi 2 (Inst.)
9. Doo bun jjae sarang - Seo Jin Young
10. Uh jjuh myun (Inst.) (Piano)
11. Serenade - Yoo Mi Sook
12. Bi mil (Inst.) (Piano)
13. Doo bun jjae sarang (Inst.) (Piano & Guitar)
14. Love - Seo Jin Young
15. Bi mil (Inst.) (Guitar)
16. Sarang han da myun - Jung In Ho & Seo Jin Young
17. Yuh woo bi (Inst.)
18. Love (Inst.) (Piano & Guitar)

Spring Waltz soundtrack

1. Teardrop Waltz
2. One Love - Loveholic
3. Childhood
4. Cannonball - Damien Rice
5. Clementine - Lee Ji Soo
6. Flower - U-na
7. Bom eh waltz
8. Nae in saeng eh bom nal - S Jin
9. A Sad Memory - Jang Se Yong
10. Ee jen sarang hal soo it suh yo - Yurisangja
11. Shadow Waltz - Jang Se Yong
12. Moo ji gae - Bada
13. Song Of Island - Lee Ji Soo
14. Soo ho chun sa - S Jin
15. Flashback
16. Ma eum eu ro boo reu neun no rae - Myung In Hee
17. Tears For Remembrance

Spring Waltz Classics

Spring Waltz - Yoon Jae Ha

A double-disc piano collection packaged exactly like the male lead character's first Korean special release album, also bearing that character's name.

CD 1

1. Bom eh waltz (Spring Waltz) (Piano Version) - Yiruma
2. Day Dream - Park Jong Hoon
3. Sunday Afternoon Waltz - Park Jong Hoon
4. Sum eh ee ya gi (Dreaming Island's Story) (Piano Version) - Yiruma
5. Il uh buh rin sum (Lost In Island) (Piano Version) - Yiruma
6. A Sad Motive - Park Jong Hoon
7. Broken Blossoms (Vivace) - Yiruma
8. To My Little Girl I (Clementine) - Yiruma
9. I Think You Love Me - Park Jong Hoon
10. Byul ee ji gi jun eh (Before The Star) - Yiruma
11. Sum eh ee ya gi" (Dreaming Island's Story) (Clarinet Solo by Hee Jeong Lucia Kye) - Yiruma
12. Ga eul eul dalm eun bom I (Autumn-Colored Spring I) (Guitar Solo By Minseok Kim) - Yiruma
13. Men's Tears (Cello By Huh Yun Jung) - Park Jong Hoon
14. Ga eul eul dalm eun bom II (Autumn-Colored Spring II) (Piano & Guitar Version) - Yiruma
15. Il uh buh rin sum (Lost In Island) (String Version) (Cello By Huh Yun Jung) - Yiruma
16. Silence - Park Jong Hoon
17. Nuh eh dwit mo seub - Park Jong Hoon
18. To My Little Girl II (Clementine) - Yiruma
19. Guten Morgen - Park Jong Hoon
20. Bom eh waltz (Spring Waltz) (String Version) (Clarinet By Hee Jeong Lucia Kye) - Yiruma
21. To My Little Girl III (Clementine) (Bonus Track) - Yiruma
22. Il uh buh rin sum (Lost In Island) (Free Version) (Bonus Track) - Yiruma

CD 2

1. Chopin, Nocturne in C # minor - Kim Jong Won
2. Schumann, Humoreske - Kim Jong Won
3. Chopin, Waltz in B minor - Kim Jong Won
4. Chopin, Prelude in E minor, Op. 28-4 - Kim Jong Won
5. Chopin, Etude in E major, op. 10-3 'Chanson de l'adieu' - Kim Jong Won
6. Tchaikovsky, 'Autumn Song' - Kim Jong Won
7. Chopin, Nocturne in E♭major, op. 9-2 - Kim Jong Won
8. Chopin, Etude in E♭minor, op. 10-6 - Kim Jong Won
9. Chopin, Prelude in D♭Major, op. 28-15 'Raindrop' - Kim Jong Won
10. Tchaikovsky, Nocturne in C♯ minor - Kim Jong Won

Love Poem

A maxi-single released with songs inspired by Spring Waltz.

1. Love Poem
2. Flying Petals
3. Nocturne For Clementine
4. Ggoom sok eh suh
5. Love Poem (Piano Solo)
6. Ggoom sok eh suh (Piano Solo)
7. Flying Petals (Piano Duet)

=== International releases ===
Winter Sonata Piano Classic Version (Japan)

1. Saisho kara ima made
2. My Memory
3. Yokan
4. Shiroi koibitotachi
5. Ima demo
6. Missing You
7. Sparks
8. Goodbye My Love
9. Love Is Blue
10. Hajimete
11. Anata dake ga
12. Moment
13. Koibito
14. Hajimari
15. Kioku no naka e
16. Wasurenai go
17. Sumire
18. Hanasenai koi
19. Let's Dream, Once Again

Winter Sonata overseas edition soundtrack

Includes the single 'Moment' by Ryu which while being a major theme in the show was not included in the original album but was only released with Ryu's album by the same name.

1. Chuh eum boo tuh ji geum gga ji (From the Beginning Til Now) - Ryu
2. My Memory - Ryu
3. It ji ma (Don't Forget Me) - Ryu
4. Moment - Ryu
5. Geu dae man ee (For You) - Ryu
6. My Memory (Chinese Version)
7. Chuh eum boo tuh ji geum gga ji (From the Beginning Til Now) - (instrumental)
8. My Memory (Piano Ver.)
9. Chuh eum (First time)
10. My Memory (piano)
11. Let's Dream Once Again
12. When Love Fails
13. Geu dae man ee (For You) – (piano)
14. Stepping On a Rainy Street
15. Geu dae man ee (For You) – (violin and piano)

Summer Scent overseas edition soundtrack

Contains all of the tracks of the original plus 'Neowi Hyangii' (Your Scent), an instrumental piece of 'YuhReum Hyanggi (Say Yes). 'YuhReum Hyanggi' was also retitled as 'Neowi Hyanggi'.

1. bi mil - Jung In Ho
2. uh jjuh myun - Seo Jin Young
3. doo bun jjae sarang - Seo Jin Young
4. nowi hyanggi (yuh reum hyang gi) - Jung In Ho
5. Love - Seo Jin Young
6. Second Romance - Seo Jin Young
7. sarang han da myun - Jung In Ho & Seo Jin Young
8. Serenade - Yoo Mi Sook
9. doo bun jjae sarang (Inst.) (Piano & Guitar)
10. bi mil (Inst.) (Guitar)
11. uh jjuh myun (Inst.) (Piano)
12. Main Title (Serenade)
13. Love (Inst.) (Piano & Guitar)
14. neowi hyanggi - (inst.)*
15. saranghanda myeon (inst.) (piano)*
16. yuh woo bi (Inst.)
17. yuh reum hyang gi 2 (Inst.)
18. bi mil (Inst.) (Piano)
19. Serenade (Inst.) (Guitar)

=== Filipino soundtracks ===
Endless Love: The Original Soundtrack

The first album to bear the name 'Endless Love' and be labeled 'original soundtrack' at once. While it contains a lot of musical cues for Autumn Tale, they were not used in the show but seemed to be similar in theme to those used in the Korean album. 'Paglisan', a soprano piece and the 'Endless Love Theme' were songs included here and used in the show. Both songs, along with all the music in the album were composed and arranged by the local Filipino composer Paulo Almaden. The Philippine version of the main title theme is not present in this album.

1. Endless Love Theme – Lara Morena
2. Reminiscing
3. Destiny
4. My Romance
5. Endless Love Orchestra
6. Lonely Waters
7. The Road Home
8. Autumn In My Heart
9. Autumn Scent
10. Cry
11. Keep this Love Alive – Joanne Gracella
12. Hiram – Anton Diva
13. In My Arms
14. Paglisan – Elaine Lee

Endless Love: The Album

Features remakes of all three songs from the Korean soundtrack (including the main theme) and songs inspired by Autumn Tale. The outer packaging (box) is white while the inner packaging (a booklet w/ photos which holds the CD) is blue, which is a reversal of the second album's colors. Both were released simultaneously.

1. Ikaw – Carmela Cuneta (remade from 'Reason' which was the main theme)
2. Alay Sa Yo - Carmela Cuneta
3. Pangako Sa Yo – Carmela Cuneta
4. Umibig Na – Anne Jomeo (remade from 'Ul Mana Nae Ga')
5. Habang Buhay – Anne Jomeo
6. The One – Anne Jomeo
7. Kahit Na – Raine (remade from 'gi do')
8. Pagbigyan Muli – Raine
9. Tala – Raine
10. Forever – Rayne

Endless Love II Winter Sonata: The Album

Features remakes of the main theme from the Korean soundtrack of Winter Sonata and male and female remakes of 'My Memory'. The outer packaging (box) is blue while the inner packaging (a booklet w/ photos which holds the CD) is white, which is a reversal of the first album's colors. Both were released simultaneously.

1. Di Ko Na Kaya (Strings)
2. Di Ko Na Kaya – Carmela Cuneta (remade from chuh eum boo tuh ji geum gga ji and is the main theme)
3. Maghihintay Sa Yo - Carmela Cuneta
4. My Memory (of Him) – Denise Laurel (remade from 'My Memory')
5. My Memory (of Her) – Infuse (remade from 'My Memory')
6. Hardin – Infuse
7. Lumipad – Sari
8. Bakit – Sari
9. You Are – Sari
10. Di Ko Na Kaya (reprise)
11. Kung Kailan Wala Ka Na - Jolina Magdangal

Endless Love III Summer Scent: The Album

Features remakes of all the songs from the Korean soundtrack (including the main theme). The largest remake so far. The outer packaging (box) is dark green, while the inner packaging (a booklet with photos which holds the CD) is mint green, a unique combination of colors unlike the first two albums.

1. Suko na ang Puso - Carmel Cuneta (remade from 'Second Romance', now the new theme)
2. Alay Ko - Carmel Cuneta (remade from 'Uh Juh Myun')
3. Tuwing Naaalala - Carmel Cuneta
4. Pagbabalik - Anne Jomeo (remade from 'Missing You')
5. Tanging Pangako - Anne Jomeo (remade from 'Doo Byun Jae Sarang')
6. I Know It Better Now - Anne Jomeo
7. Hindi Lalayo - Marlon Mercado (remade from 'Bi Mil', which was the original theme)
8. Summer Love - Marlon Mercado (remade from 'Yuh Reum Hyanggi')
9. Pinagtagpo - Marlon Mercado and Anne Jomeo (remade from 'Saranghanda Myun')
10. Suko Na Ang Puso (Instrumental)

Endless Love: The Official Karaoke Collection

A collection of all the songs from Autumn Tale and Winter Sonata including both main themes. The box is a black ridged case with gold embossed logo. This did not include songs from the third series Summer Scent.

Endless Love: The Remix

A collection of all the remade songs from Autumn Tale and Winter Sonata including both main themes. The box can house 4 discs but contains 2. Both sides of the box have different covers for both of the CDs contained.

Acoustic Remix Side, contains all the remade songs, as well as two original Philippine songs from Autumn In My Heart.

1. Ikaw - Carmela Cuneta (remade from 'Reason')
2. Di Ko Na Kaya - Carmela Cuneta (remade from chuh eum boo tuh ji geum gga ji)
3. My Memory (Of Her) - Infuse (remade from 'My Memory')
4. Kahit Na - Rayne (remade from 'gi do')
5. Tala - Rayne
6. Umibig Na - Carmela Cuneta (remade from 'ul ma na naega')
7. My Memory (Of Him) - Denise Laurel (remade from 'My Memory')
8. Paglisan - Elaine Lee

Club Remix Side

1. Ikaw (Blue Skies Mix)
2. Di Ko Na Kaya (Tribal Edit)
3. My Memory Of Her (Trumpet Breaks Mix)
4. Kahit Na (Manila House)
5. Tala (Dreamscape Mix)
6. Umibig Na (Slow Breaks Mix)
7. My Memory Of Him (Wakataw Mix)
8. Paglisan (Stealth Mix)
9. Bonus Track - Di Ko Na Kaya (Panocha Mix)

There is a theme song of Endless Love: Winter Sonata that is not part of the album with the same name. It is "Kung Kailan Wala Ka Na" which was sung by Jolina Magdangal and heard sometimes in ending credits.

== See also ==
- List of Korean television shows
- Korean drama
- Contemporary culture of South Korea
- Yoon Seok-ho
