= Spring Waltz =

2006 South Korean television series

- Promotional poster
- Also known as: Endless Love: Spring Waltz
- Hangul: 봄의 왈츠
- RR: Bomui walcheu
- MR: Pomŭi walch'ŭ
- Genre: Romance; Melodrama
- Created by: KBS Drama Production
- Written by: Kim Ji-yeon; Hwang Da-eun; Gu Ji-won; Ha Mi-seon
- Directed by: Yoon Seok-ho
- Starring: Seo Do-young; Han Hyo-joo; Daniel Henney; Lee So-yeon
- Music by: Choi Wan-hee; Kim Hyeong-seok; Lee Ji-soo; Jang Se-yong
- Country of origin: South Korea
- Original languages: Korean; German and English (in addition to Korean itself)
- No. of episodes: 20

Production
- Executive producers: Jung Sung-ho; Kim Jong-shik; Park In-taek; Moon Bo-hyun
- Producer: Lee Jae-sang
- Production locations: Austria; Seoul
- Camera setup: Multi-camera
- Running time: 70 minutes Mondays and Tuesdays at 21:55 (KST)
- Production company: Yoon's Color

Original release
- Network: KBS2
- Release: March 6 – May 16, 2006

Related
- Autumn in My Heart (2000); Winter Sonata (2002); Summer Scent (2003)

Spring Waltz (Korean: 봄의 왈츠; RR: Bomui walcheu) is a 2006 South Korean television series starring Seo Do-young, Han Hyo-joo, Daniel Henney and Lee So-yeon. It is the fourth and final installment of season-themed tetralogy Endless Love series directed by Yoon Seok-ho, following Autumn in My Heart, Winter Sonata and Summer Scent. It aired on KBS2 from March 6 to May 16, 2006, on Mondays and Tuesdays at 21:55 (KST) for 20 eepisodes.

== Synopsis ==
Yoon Jae-ha (Seo Do-young) is a wealthy young man who lives an honorable life as a gifted pianist. As a child, however, Jae-ha lived with his father who was a conman and endured a miserable childhood.

Seo Eun-young (Han Hyo-joo) lived on the island of Chungsan with her mom happily. Darkness came when Lee Jong-tae (Lee Han-wi) and his son Soo-ho (Jae-ha's real name) appeared. The man stole money from Eun-young's mother, which was set aside for Eun-young's surgery. When Eun-young's mother travels to Seoul to look for Jong-tae, she dies in an accident.

At the hospital where Eun-young is hospitalized, Jae-ha's foster mother Hyun Ji-sook (Geum Bo-ra) was also there due to her son's death. Her diplomat husband Yoon Myung-hoon (Jung Dong-hwan) asks Soo-ho to become their son, and they would in return pay for Eun-young's surgery. Soo-ho now adopts the identity of Yoon Jae-ha (the name of their deceased son) and leaves for Austria. Meanwhile, Eun-young successfully receives her surgery. She grows up with a new family, and now makes accessories and sells them on the streets.

One day, Eun-young wins an exhibition contest and, as a prize, travels to Austria. There she meets Jae-ha and his friends Phillip (Daniel Henney) and Song Yi-na (Lee So-yeon). When Jae-ha and Eun-young first met, they were at odds, but slowly they began to feel attracted to each other. Jae-ha then makes the shocking discovery that Eun-young is the girl he met in the past. Jae-ha tries to hide this from Eun-Young, but she eventually finds out, and leaves.

As Eun-young tries to forget Jae-ha, she returns to Korea and there, Jae-ha appears again.

== Cast ==
=== Main ===
- Seo Do-young as Lee Soo-ho/Yoon Jae-ha
  - Eun Won-jae as young Lee Soo-ho

A talented classical pianist. Even though he was brought up in a rich and enviable family, Jae-ha is a lonely person due to his eccentric and particular personality. He shows his true feelings only to his best friend and manager, Phillip. At first, Jae-ha is interested in Eun-young when he meets her in Austria because she is similar to his childhood sweetheart. As he sees her with the playboy Phillip, he begins to form a wrong impression of her.

- Han Hyo-joo as Seo Eun-young/Park Eun-young
  - Han So-yi as young Seo Eun-young

A hardworking and optimistic woman who works at her adoptive mother's kimbap (Korean rolled rice) restaurant in the daytime and sells homemade accessories and clothes at her street stand at night. She gets the opportunity to visit Austria, and there meets Phillip and Jae-ha by fate. Eun-young, who does not know of this, deeply misses Soo-ho from her childhood.

- Daniel Henney as Phillip Rosenthal

The only friend as well as the manager of Yoon Jae-ha. He was born to an Austrian father and a Korean mother and was expected to become a promising musician during his childhood. Instead, he decides to pursue his dream by becoming the manager of Jae-ha, whom Phillip acknowledges as being a true musical genius. He has playboy tendencies.

- Lee So-yeon as Song Yi-na
  - Shim Eun-kyung as young Song Yi-na

A capable career woman who started her career from the bottom and became the director of the planning department in a leading classical record and concert company. Having liked Jae-ha since childhood, she recklessly gave up playing the piano and left for Canada to find Jae-ha after he left Korea.

=== Supporting ===
- Geum Bo-ra as Hyun Ji-sook, Jae-ha's mother
- Jung Dong-hwan as Yoon Myung-hoon, Jae-ha's father
- Lee Han-wi as Lee Jong-tae, Soo-ho's father
- Yoon Yoo-sun as Jo Hye-sun, Eun-young's birth mother
- Kim Hae-sook as Jo Yang-soon, Eun-young's aunt and adoptive mother
- Park Chil-yong as Park Doo-shik, Eun-young's adoptive father
- Choi Si-won as Park Sang-woo, Eun-young's cousin and adoptive brother
- Choi Ja-hye as Hong Mi-jung, Eun-young's best friend
  - Han Bo-bae as young Hong Mi-jung
- Park Hee-jin as Kim Hee-jin, Yi-na's friend
- Kim Mi-kyung as Kim Bong-hee, Mi-jung's mother

== Production ==
Spring Waltz was the final feature of the season-themed drama series directed by Yoon Seok-ho. Although the story shares the similar format of genuine love and childhood memories, Yoon adds several fresh twists and turns. In this miniseries, the drama's message is conveyed more actively through the season "spring". Love is compared to the way spring blossoms into lives, bringing a sense of hope. Love is also depicted as gently embracing the protagonists' lonely hearts, which are chillingly numb in the midst of a long and harsh "winter". Another noticeable change is that this series is the only feature out of four season series to include overseas locations, namely Austria, where filming took place around well-known tourist spots such as Hallstatt and Salzburg. Moreover, most of its production money came from external sources and investments made by domestic and foreign interests. With news that the drama was sold to nine countries including Japan, Taiwan, Thailand, Hong Kong, Singapore, Malaysia, Macau, Brunei and the Philippines, the series garnered widespread attention from the media industry even before the series aired in March 2006.

One of the most striking differences from previous installments, is the casting. All four main characters are relative newcomers, who were cast in the leading role for the first time. The casting of the two lead actors – Seo Do-young (a model-turned actor who previously appeared in small supporting roles in a few TV shows) and Han Hyo-joo (a newbie actress best known for the teenage sitcom Nonstop 5) - brought a controversial yet refreshing spin into the drama's production. Sung Yu-ri was originally cast as Eun-young but when she backed out of the drama, Yoon unexpectedly chose Han, who had auditioned for a smaller role. Model-turned-actor Daniel Henney was perhaps the most high-profile actor of the four, after his role in 2005 hit My Lovely Sam Soon. Initially the character Philip character did not exist. However, after seeing Henney audition, Yoon was attracted to the actor's unique facial expressions and gestures, so the director decided to create a new role just for him. Lee So-yeon, on the other hand, had more experience in TV and film, notably Untold Scandal in 2003. In interviews, Yoon told the press that he deliberately chose to work with new actors rather than already-established actors, who tend to have chiseled images that do not have enough flexibility. Working with new faces, Yoon said, is "like working on a new painting on a new white canvas."

Renowned for his captivating ability to bring picturesque scenery and memorable music onto the screen, Yoon takes maximum advantage of the spectacular view of Hallstatt lake to convey Jae-ha's sorrow and his yearning for his lost identity and lost love.

One of Yoon's main motifs for this series is the "island" - Cheongsando - a place that is seemingly isolated from the rest of the world. He and his production crew reportedly hunted for the perfect island setting for months. They eventually decided on a few islands located in South Jeolla Province. Cheongsando was the site where the young Soo-ho and Eun-young meet and reunite again as adults, while heart-shaped Hanuneom Beach in Bigeumdo is the place where the children share their innocent feelings of affection and love towards each other.

An island as a place, Yoon says, tends to be a fantasy in everyone's mind. It brings out a sense of nostalgia which is quite distant from the reality of everyday life. Childhood love also is a fantasy in many a memory. Spring Waltz explores such fantasy of our first love – how the pure and genuine love for someone can face the reality of living with mental bruises and an identity crisis, and eventually heal the painful process of forgiveness and reconciliation, just like the way spring brings us a hope.

== Ratings ==
Date	Episode	Nationwide	Seoul
2006-03-06	1	10.9 (12th)	10.9 (13th)
2006-03-07	2	11.5 (13th)	10.8 (15th)
2006-03-13	3	12.1 (14th)	13.6 (14th)
2006-03-14	4	14.7 (7th)	14.9 (5th)
2006-03-20	5	15.3 (4th)	16.8 (3rd)
2006-03-21	6	13.4 (3rd)	13.6 (2nd)
2006-03-27	7	15.8 (4th)	16.4 (3rd)
2006-03-28	8	14.6 (6th)	15.3 (5th)
2006-04-03	9	16.2 (5th)	16.8 (2nd)
2006-04-04	10	17.5 (3rd)	17.9 (3rd)
2006-04-10	11	18.9 (2nd)	19.6 (2nd)
2006-04-11	12	18.5 (2nd)	19.1 (2nd)
2006-04-24	13	19.7 (2nd)	20.4 (1st)
2006-04-25	14	20.8 (1st)	23.4 (1st)
2006-05-01	15	22.4 (1st)	25.6 (1st)
2006-05-02	16	20.6 (1st)	22.4 (1st)
2006-05-08	17	21.6 (1st)	22.3 (1st)
2006-05-09	18	22.2 (1st)	23.6 (1st)
2006-05-15	19	23.5 (1st)	24.6 (1st)
2006-05-16	20	25.8 (1st)	27.2 (1st)
Average		17.8%	18.7%

== Awards and nominations ==
Year	Award	Category	Recipient	Result
2006	KBS Drama Awards	Top Excellence Award, Actress	Kim Hae-sook	Nominated
2006	KBS Drama Awards	Best Supporting Actor	Lee Han-wi	Won
2006	KBS Drama Awards	Best New Actress	Han Hyo-joo	Nominated
2006	KBS Drama Awards	Best Young Actor	Eun Won-jae	Nominated
2006	KBS Drama Awards	Popularity Award, Actor	Daniel Henney	Nominated

== DVD release ==
The director's cut DVD is shorter than the original broadcast version, with the scenes removed totaling close to 3 hours long. As of June 2010, there is no information as to whether the "uncut" original broadcast version will ever be authorized for release.

=== Noticeable edits (North American version) ===
- Numbering of individual episodes are omitted
- Due to the editing, some episodes ended at different times/scenes than the original broadcast.
- Dramatic endings, which included episode credits and previews, were also removed.
- The story arc involving Hong Mi-jung and Park Sang-woo was completely removed.
- Episode 11 — During their first outing as a couple, Jae-ha leaves Eun-young in front of her mother's restaurant. Before leaving, he kisses her cheek. Her mother observes them through the restaurant window. (SCENE REMOVED)
- Episode 18 — Phillip & Eun-young are at the museum. Jae-ha's mother and Yi-na appear. All four go out to lunch; Jae-ha joins them. Eun-young later leaves after Yi-na presents her and Jae-ha's wedding invitation. (SCENE REMOVED)
- Episode 18 — Eun-young returns Jae-ha's jacket along with the rainbow shell. Jae-ha runs after her asking her not to leave. Eun-young answers, "...Why won't you allow me to hate you". (SCENE REMOVED)

=== Dubbed ===
A Tagalog-dubbed DVD was released in the Philippines through Star Records (now Star Music).

== International airings ==
Spring Waltz (with no Endless Love IV) aired in the Philippines on ABS-CBN's Primetime Bida line up from December 25, 2007 to February 8, 2008 replacing Princess Sarah and was replaced by Marrying a Millionaire on February 18 the following week.

It's also aired in Vietnam on Hanoi TV on March 4, 2007.
