= Choi Woo-hyuk (actor, born 1985) =

South Korean actor

- Born: October 28, 1985 (age 40); Seoul, South Korea
- Occupation: Actor
- Years active: 1993–2009

Korean name
- Hangul: 최우혁
- RR: Choe Uhyeok
- MR: Ch'oe Uhyŏk
- Website: Choi Woo-hyuk Bel Actor profile

Choi Woo-hyuk (Korean: 최우혁; born October 28, 1985) is a former South Korean actor. He is best known for his role in the 2000 hit drama series Autumn in My Heart.

== Biography ==
Choi Woo Hyuk began acting at the age of eight, debuting in the movie I Want to Go to the Island. Choi has also appeared in several dramas, but made his big breakthrough in the popular drama Endless Love 1 Autumn in My Heart, with many other Korean stars, such as: Song Seung-heon, Won Bin, Song Hye-kyo and Moon Geun-young. Woo Hyuk was only 15 years old when he played the role of young Yoon Joon-suh.

After his first success, Choi went on to appear in the drama Glass Slippers (2002) playing the character of young Jang Jae-hyuk). He also appeared in the movie No Manners (Conduct Zero)(2002) in the same year.

Choi took a hiatus from acting for seven years in 2002. Choi stated in an interview that he wanted to continue his studies and fulfill his mandatory two-year military service. Despite his absence from the entertainment scene, Choi continued to have many loyal fans, called “Woo Hyukolics”.

Six years later (September 2008), Bel Actors Entertainment revealed current pictures of Choi, creating a buzz across Korean websites. It was said that Bel Actors Entertainment revealed the pictures because Choi was slated to play the role of young Seongjong in the historical drama Empress Chun Chu (2009). Notably, Choi performed his first ever love scene with actress Kim Min-ji in that drama.

In August 2009, a "Woo Hyukolic" made a fan video on YouTube with his co-star from Autumn in My Heart, Moon Geun-young in an attempt get them cast in a drama together once again. On August 5, 2009 the fan video became the "#3 – Most Responded (Today) – in South Korea". Choi and Moon fan's are still waiting with high hopes.

== Education ==
Choi graduated from Seoul Yongdong Elementary School (용동초등학교), Hagye Middle School (하계중학교), Eonnam High School (언남고등학교). He received a film and theater degree from Chung-Ang University in 2012.

== Filmography ==
- 2009 - KBS2 Empress Cheonchu
- 2002 - KBS1 Age of Warriors
- 2002 - SBS Glass Slippers
- 2000 - KBS The King and the Queen
- 2000 - KBS Autumn in My Heart
- 1999 - MBC Did We Really Love?
- 1998 - MBC Drop 2
- 1997 - SBS Happiness in Our Heart
- 1997 - MBC Mimang
- 1996 - MBC Temptation
- 1996 - SBS A Full Heart

=== Film ===
- 2002 - No Manners
- 1998 - An Affair
- 1996 - Seven Rascals
- 1993 - To the Starry Island

=== CF ===
- 2000 - CheilJedang Cupcake
- 2000 - Dongwon F&B Oh-gok-eum-ryo
- 1998 - Nongshim Capri Sone
- 1998 - Haitai Yeon Yang Gaeng
