= Yoon Seok-ho =

South Korean television drama director (born 1957)

- Hangul: 윤석호
- Hanja: 尹錫瑚
- RR: Yun Seokho
- MR: Yun Sŏkho

Yoon Seok-ho (Korean: 윤석호; born 4 June 1957) is a South Korean television drama director.

He was the director of four TV series produced by KBS that are sometimes collectively referred to as Endless Love, each containing the name of one of the four seasons in its title. The series were immensely popular throughout Asia, especially Winter Sonata, and intensified a surge in popularity of Korean popular culture known as Hallyu.

== Profile ==
- Joined KBS in 1985
- Worked as senior producer/production director for KBS
- Current president of Yoon's Color Ltd.

== Work ==
- Love Rain (KBS2, 2012)
- Wedding Dress (KBS, 2009)
- Endless Love
  - Spring Waltz (KBS, 2006)
  - Summer Scent (KBS, 2003)
  - Winter Sonata (KBS, 2002)
  - Autumn in My Heart (KBS, 2000)
- Invitation (KBS, 1999)

== Awards ==
- Best TV Director, 38th Baeksang Arts Awards (2002)
- Drama Work Award, Korea Broadcasting Grand Awards
- Merit Award from Kinema Junbo, Japan
- Selected as the Person of the Year in 2004 by UNESCO Seoul Association
