= Love Rain =

2012 South Korean television series

- Promotional poster
- Also known as: Love Rides the Rain
- Hangul: 사랑비
- RR: Sarangbi
- MR: Sarangbi
- Genre: Romance, Melodrama
- Created by: Oh Soo-yeon
- Directed by: Yoon Seok-ho
- Starring: Im Yoon-ah; Jang Keun-suk
- Country of origin: South Korea
- Original language: Korean
- No. of episodes: 20

Production
- Production locations: South Korea; Hokkaido, Japan
- Running time: 60 minutes
- Production company: Yoon's Color

Original release
- Network: Korean Broadcasting System
- Release: March 26 – May 29, 2012

Love Rain (Korean: 사랑비; RR: Sarangbi) is a 2012 South Korean television series directed by Yoon Seok-ho. Set in the seventies and the present day, it tells a love story over two generations, with Jang Keun-suk and Im Yoon-ah playing dual roles. It aired on KBS2 from March 26 to May 29, 2012, on Mondays and Tuesdays at 21:55 for 20 episodes.

Despite low viewership ratings in Korea, it was popular overseas and was the most expensive Korean drama presold to Japan in 2012.

== Synopsis ==
It's love at first sight when Seo In-ha (Jang Keun-suk) and Kim Yoon-hee (Im Yoon-ah) meet as shy university students in the seventies. It takes time for the hesitant pair to finally voice their feelings, but circumstances beyond their control send them down different paths. In 2012, In-ha (Jung Jin-young) is now unhappily married to Baek Hye-jung, one of Yoon-hee's former best friends. He has never gotten over his first love, and when he runs into Yoon-hee (Lee Mi-sook) after so many years, the two reconcile and look forward to making up for lost time.

In-ha's son Seo Joon (Jang Keun-suk) is a photographer, and he bumps into Yoon-hee's daughter Jung Ha-na (Im Yoon-ah) by chance. Unlike her mother, Ha-na is a cheerful and vivacious girl, and though they initially find each other troublesome, even as they argue, they can't help but be drawn to each other. In search of a house, she rents a place near Seo Joon, and they start sharing their day-to-day activities together. Gradually their feelings develop, and Joon and Ha-na fall in love.

Unaware that their children are dating each other, Seo In-ha (Jung Jin-young) and Kim Yoon-hee (Lee Mi-sook) announce that they are getting married, which will make Joon and Ha-na step-siblings. As both couples deal with the shock, Joon and Ha-na struggle with sacrificing their love for their parents' long-aborted happiness. But when their parents get to know about their love, they risk their relationship for their children and break up. After some time Yoon-hee goes overseas for an eye operation, with her daughter taking care of her while she pursues her gardening career there. After some days of caring for her mother, she leaves her mother in In-ha's care, so they can again purse their relationship there without any hurdles. Seo Joon and Jung Ha-na get married with the blessing of Seo Joon's mother.

== Cast ==
1970s

- Im Yoon-ah as Kim Yoon-hee
- Jang Keun-suk as Seo In-ha
- Kim Si-hoo as Lee Dong-wook
- Son Eun-seo as Baek Hye-jung
- Seo In-guk as Kim Chang-mo
- Hwang Bo-ra as Hwang In-sook

2012

- Im Yoon-ah as Jung Ha-na (Yoon-hee's daughter)
- Jang Keun-suk as Seo Joon (In-ha's son)
- Kim Si-hoo as Lee Sun-ho (Dong-wook's son)
- Jung Jin-young as Seo In-ha
- Lee Mi-sook as Kim Yoon-hee
- Kim Young-kwang as Han Tae-sung
- Oh Seung-yoon as Jo-soo
- Park Se-young as Lee Mi-ho (Dong-wook's daughter)
- Lee Chan-ho as Jang-soo
- Shin Ji-ho as In-sung
- Kwon In-ha as Lee Dong-wook
- Yoo Hye-ri as Baek Hye-jung
- Park Ji-il as Kim Chang-mo
- Seo In-guk as Kim Jeon-seol (Chang-mo's nephew)

== Production ==
Love Rain reunited director Yoon Seok-ho and screenwriter Oh Soo-yeon; they previously worked together on Autumn in My Heart and Winter Sonata a decade before.

Jung Jin-young and Jang Keun-suk were costars in the films The Happy Life (2007) and The Case of Itaewon Homicide (2009). Im Yoon-ah and Yoo Hye-ri were costars in the television series You are My Destiny (2008) and Cinderella Man (2009).

Love Rain began filming on September 24, 2011. The first day's shooting for the '70s' era took place at Keimyung University in Daegu, South Korea.

The drama was featured at the MIPTV, an international event for marketing and purchasing entertainment content held in Cannes, France in April 2012.

== Soundtrack ==
Love Rain OST
No.	Title	Artist	Length
1.	"Shiny Love"
2.	"Love Rain (사랑비)"	Jang Keun-suk	3:35
3.	"Because It's You (그대니까요)"	Tiffany	3:23
4.	"Love Is Like Rain (사랑은 비처럼)"	Na Yoon-kwon	3:52
5.	"Again and Again (자꾸 자꾸)"	Yozoh	3:58
6.	"The Girl and I (그 애와 나랑은)"	S.Jin	4:02
7.	"First Love (첫사랑)"	Kilgu	3:55
8.	"Fate (Like a Fool) (운명 (바보처럼))"	Seo In-guk	3:57
9.	"Love Rain (사랑비) - Piano Ver."
10.	"Again and Again (자꾸 자꾸) - Guitar Ver."
11.	"Song of Rain"
12.	"The Girl and I (그 애와 나랑은) - String Ver."
13.	"Shy Confession Song (수줍은 고백송)"	Milktea	2:50
14.	"You That Resemble Rain (비를 닮은 그대)"

Love Rain also featured non-Korean background music, such as "Verden Vil Bedras" by Sigvart Dagsland in episode 6, and "(Where Do I Begin?) Love Story" instrumentals in episodes 1 and 3. Also the song "Vem vet" by Swedish singer and songwriter Lisa Ekdahl is used several times during the series.

== Reception ==
Love Rain received low ratings domestically, with an average of 5.1% nationwide.

But due to the Korean Wave appeal of its lead stars Jang and Im, of all the Korean dramas sold abroad in 2012, Love Rain went for the highest price to Japan before it was even broadcast in Korea. It cost ₩450 million per episode, adding up to some ₩9 billion (or US$10 million) in total. It has since been exported to 12 countries in Asia and Europe, including China, Hong Kong, Taiwan, Thailand, Malaysia, Vietnam, Philippines, Cambodia, and Singapore, recording around ₩115 billion in overseas sales.

== Ratings ==
Episode	Broadcast Date	TNmS Ratings	AGB Ratings
Episode	Broadcast Date	Nationwide	Nationwide
1	March 26, 2012	6.1%	5.8%
2	March 27, 2012	6.0%	5.2%
3	April 2, 2012	4.8%	4.4%
4	April 3, 2012	5.3%	5.3%
5	April 9, 2012	5.2%	5.4%
6	April 10, 2012	6.5%	5.9%
7	April 16, 2012	5.5%	5.0%
8	April 17, 2012	6.0%	6.4%
9	April 23, 2012	4.7%	5.2%
10	April 24, 2012	5.0%	5.6%
11	April 30, 2012	4.7%	5.6%
12	May 1, 2012	4.3%	5.2%
13	May 7, 2012	4.0%	5.1%
14	May 8, 2012	4.6%	5.8%
15	May 14, 2012	4.6%	6.0%
16	May 15, 2012	4.2%	5.2%
17	May 21, 2012	4.7%	5.6%
18	May 22, 2012	4.7%	5.0%
19	May 28, 2012	5.5%	5.3%
20	May 29, 2012	5.6%	5.9%
Average		5.1%	5.4%

== Awards and nominations ==
Year	Award	Category	Recipient	Result
2012	7th Seoul International Drama Awards	Outstanding Korean Actor	Jang Keun-suk	Nominated
2012	5th Korea Drama Awards	Best New Actor	Seo In-guk	Won
2012	KBS Drama Awards	Excellence Award, Actor in a Mid-length Drama	Jang Keun-suk	Nominated
2012	KBS Drama Awards	Excellence Award, Actress in a Mid-length Drama	Im Yoon-ah	Nominated
2012	KBS Drama Awards	Best New Actor	Seo In-guk	Nominated
2012	KBS Drama Awards	Netizen Award	Im Yoon-ah	Won
2012	6th Mnet 20's Choice Awards	20's Female Drama Star	Love Rain	Nominated

== Plagiarism lawsuit ==
Egg Film, the production company behind the 2003 film The Classic filed an injunction at Seoul District Court against Yoon's Color for copyright infringement on June 6, 2012. In it, the motion sought to ban any future broadcast of Love Rain and any subsequent production and sales of the drama and its related products. Egg Film claimed that the TV series' plot and characters were too similar to the film, specifically the themes of a couple breaking up because one chose friendship over love, and years later their children falling in love with one another.

Yoon's Color disputed the claims, stating that the themes were common to the melodrama genre, since several scenes of The Classic were also similar to Yoon Seok-ho's earlier TV dramas. They accused Egg Film of "trying to jump on the bandwagon" given the overseas success of Love Rain.

== Film ==
Love Rain was re-edited into a two-part film which screened in Japanese theaters. The first part, composed mainly of scenes set in the 1970s, was released on September 20, 2013, while the second part, which focuses on the present day, was released on October 11, 2013. The film later aired on cable channel WOWOW in August 2014.
