= Baby and I =

- Theatrical poster
- Hangul: 아기와 나
- RR: Agiwa na
- MR: Agiwa na
- Directed by: Kim Jin-young
- Written by: Choi Won; Lee Seong-min
- Based on: Baby & Me by Marimo Ragawa
- Produced by: Lee Seo-yeol
- Starring: Jang Keun-suk; Moon Mason; Song Ha-yoon
- Edited by: Moon In-dae
- Music by: Jang Dae-seong
- Release date: August 13, 2008
- Running time: 96 minutes
- Country: South Korea
- Language: Korean
- Box office: $2,401,128

Baby and I (Korean: 아기와 나; RR: Agiwa na) is a 2008 South Korean film. It tells about a rebellious 18-year-old high school student who ends up caring for a baby with a note, claiming he is the baby's father.

== Plot ==
Han Joon-soo (Jang Keun-suk), a clumsy 18-year-old high school student, gets into fights with his parents and does not obey them. Joon-soo's parents are sick of his bad behavior and run away from home, leaving only a videotape and $100, stating they would come back when he got his act together. Wanting to escape them, he decides to just throw a small party with his friends – Ki-seok (Ko Gyoo-pil) and Choon-seung (Choi Jae-hwan) – in his empty house.

While buying alcohol at a grocery store, a baby with a note is left in his cart. The note claims the high school senior, Han Joon-soo, is the father of the baby and the mother could not take care of him anymore. The baby's name is revealed to be Han Woo-ram (Moon Mason). Joon-soo finds himself stuck with the child, he tries abandoning Woo-ram multiple times, but always fails. Without anyone to help him, other than Kim Byul (Song Ha-yoon), a smart girl who has a crush on him, Joon-soo resorts to bringing the baby to school and his part-time jobs. Finally, he is suspended from school due to the baby being a disturbance. After days of becoming financially broke and sinking to the bottom, his parents come back home when Joon-soo has an emotional breakdown and expresses his sympathy and love for the baby; a love that changed him from troublemaker to a caring father.

Joon-soo's parents acknowledge their love for their son and tell him that they will help take care of Woo-ram. When Woo-ram is admitted to the hospital, Joon-soo becomes depressed and meets up Ki-seok. Ki-seok tells Joon-soo that he himself is the father of Woo-ram. Furious, Joon-soo beats up Ki-seok and tells him to take Woo-ram back. Joon-soo later lies to Byul and Choon-seung that he does not care about Woo-ram anymore. Woo-ram, now out of the hospital, is being adopted by a couple from overseas. After contemplating, Joon-soo races to the airport and fights his way through security. At the gate, he yells for the couple to give Woo-ram back to him. Later, Joon-soon agrees with Ki-Seok that they will raise Woo-ram together. Byul sends Ki-seok and Choon-seung to go buy some soda, wanting to be alone with Joon-soo. After she coyly compliments his "cool" behavior at the airport, Byul gives Joon-soo a quick kiss before running off.

== Release ==
Baby and I was released on August 10, 2008. The film was directed by Kim Jin-young. The film had an attendance of 435,551 nationwide and received negative reviews overall.

== Cast ==
- Jang Keun-suk as Han Joon-soo
- Park Myung-soo as Baby Woo-ram (voice)
- Song Ha-yoon as Kim Byul
- Ko Kyu-pil as Ki-seok
- Choi Jae-hwan as Choon-seong
- Kim Byeong-ok as Joon-soo's father
- Park Hyun-sook as Joon-soo's mother
- Jung Gyu-soo as Kim Byul's father
- Jang Jung-hee as Kim Byul's mother
- Song Min-hyung as Vice principal
- Kim Jung-nan as Ms. Cho
- Kim Do-yeon as Do Pong woman
- Gil Hae-yeon as Ki-seok's mother
