= Lisa Ekdahl (album) =

Studio album by Lisa Ekdahl
- Released: February 1994
- Genre: Jazz, pop
- Length: 38:23
- Label: EMI
- Producer: Gunnar Nordén

Lisa Ekdahl chronology
Lisa Ekdahl (1994)	Med kroppen mot jorden (1996)

Lisa Ekdahl is the debut studio album by Lisa Ekdahl, released in 1994. For the album, she was awarded a Grammis Award in the "album of the year" category.

== Track listing ==
All songs written by Lisa Ekdahl.

1. Öppna upp ditt fönster – 3:47
2. Benen i kors – 3:26
3. I tveksamhetens tid – 2:27
4. Jag skrek – 2:42
5. Åh Gud – 3:01
6. Sanningen i vitögat – 2:26
7. Det är en nåd – 1:53
8. Vem vet – 3:06
9. Jag bara vet – 2:41
10. Flyg vilda fågel – 2:00
11. På jakt efter solen – 3:37
12. Kunde jag vrida tiden tillbaka – 2:47
13. Du sålde våra hjärtan – 4:04
14. Ro och Lisa – 0:26 (Unlisted track)

== Personnel ==
- Lisa Ekdahl – song, guitar
- Gunnar Nordén – guitar, bass, piano, accordion, arrangement
- Christer Jansson – percussion, drums
- Bill Öhrström – harmonica, congas
- Rafael Sida – percussion
- Hector Bingert – flute, soprano saxophone
- Christina Wirdegren – cello
- Ulf Adåker – trumpet
- Marianne Flynner – choir

== Charts ==
Chart (1994–1996)	Peak position
Norwegian Albums (VG-lista)	1
Swedish Albums (Sverigetopplistan)	1

== Certifications ==
Region	Certification	Certified units/sales
Norway (IFPI Norway)	Platinum	50,000^{*}
^{*} Sales figures based on certification alone.
