= Jang Keun-suk =

South Korean singer and actor (born 1987)

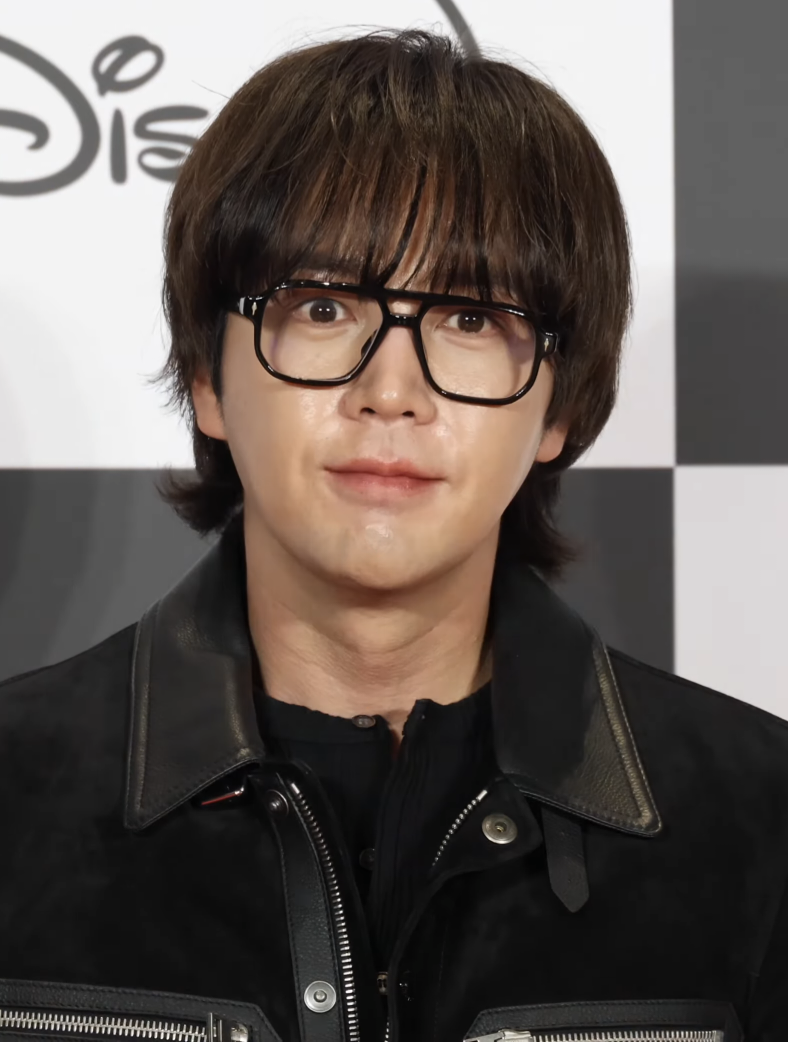
- Jang in December 2025
- Born: August 4, 1987 (age 39); Seoul, South Korea
- Education: Hanyang University
- Occupations: Singer; actor; director
- Years active: 1992–present
- Agent: CRAFT_42 Entertainment (formerly Tree J Company)

Korean name
- Hangul: 장근석
- Hanja: 張根碩
- RR: Jang Geunseok
- MR: Chang Kŭnsŏk
- Website: princejks.com

Jang Keun-suk (Korean: 장근석; born August 4, 1987) is a South Korean singer and actor. He is best known for starring in the Korean television dramas Beethoven Virus (2008), You're Beautiful (2009), Marry Me, Mary! (2010), Love Rain (2012), Bel Ami (2013), The Royal Gambler (2016), and Switch (2018).

== Early life ==
Jang started working as a child model at the age of five after he was discovered by a talent agent. At that time, Jang's parents were selling their house and the agent, who was a prospective buyer, saw Jang. Seeing his potential, the agent advised Jang's parents to allow him to try a career in modeling.

In junior high school, Jang went to school in New Zealand, where he attended Nelson College in 2003, to learn English and Japanese.

== Film career ==
=== Pre-debut ===
Jang made his acting debut in the 1997 HBS (now Channel CGV) sitcom Selling Happiness. He then continued to work in television as a child actor. Studying in New Zealand at the time, a role in the popular MBC sitcom Nonstop 4 brought him back to South Korea.

=== 2005–2008: Beginnings ===
In 2005, Jang played the president's son in the SBS drama Lovers in Prague. In 2006, Jang debuted on the big screen in the Japanese horror film One Missed Call: Final where he played the role of a deaf boy. He next played the first love of famous gisaeng Hwang Jini (played by Ha Ji-won) in the period drama Hwang Jini. In 2007, Jang was cast in the rock music-themed film The Happy Life, directed by Lee Joon-ik. Jang then co-hosted SBS's weekly live music show Inkigayo from February 25 to October 7, 2007.

In 2008, Jang would go on to act in two more music-inspired projects with the film Do Re Mi Fa So La Ti Do, and the MBC drama Beethoven Virus opposite Kim Myung-min, in which he played a trumpet player in an orchestra. He also starred in the KBS drama, Hong Gil-dong as the fictional brother of King Gwanghae who vies for Joseon's throne. Afterwards, he starred opposite Moon Mason in the movie Baby and I.

=== 2009–2013: Overseas popularity ===
Jang gained more recognition after starring in You're Beautiful (2009), playing the leader of fictional K-pop band A.N.J.E.L, who falls in love with a fellow band member who is a girl pretending to be her twin brother (played by Park Shin-hye). The series gained a cult following, and earned high ratings in Japan.

The same year, he took on his first villain role in the thriller The Case of Itaewon Homicide, based on the real-life Itaewon murder case in which a young Korean-American was accused of stabbing a Korean student to death. Jang spoke his lines in English throughout the entire film, and Beyond Hollywood praised him as having "performed very well" in the role.

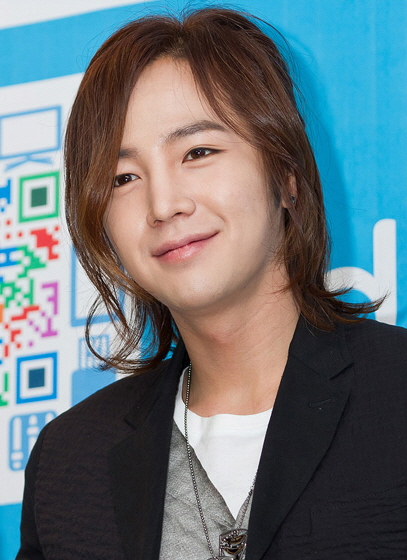
Jang in April 2011

In 2010, he starred opposite Moon Geun-young in the romantic comedy series Mary Stayed Out All Night. This was followed by another rom-com You're My Pet, adapted from the Japanese manga Kimi wa Petto in which a younger man willingly becomes the "pet" of a career woman (played by Kim Ha-neul). In 2011, Jang starred in the short film Budapest Diary, reportedly participated in the writing and location scouting for the film.

Jang then worked with TV director Yoon Seok-ho on the melodrama series Love Rain, in which he and costar Im Yoon-ah played dual roles in the 1970s and 2012. The drama garnered much positive overseas interest and was sold to Japan for $10 million, the second highest price for a KBS drama at the time, partly due to Jang's popularity. In 2013, Jang starred in another series adapted from a manhwa, Bel Ami opposite IU.

=== 2015: Scandal and hiatus, directorial debut ===
Jang filmed the reality show Three Meals a Day: Fishing Village with Cha Seung-won and Yoo Hae-jin, which was supposed to air in January 2015. However, due to a refuted tax evasion controversy in which a fine was paid of ₩10 billion (US$9.27 million) for his agency under-reporting taxes led to him dropping out of the program. He had previously been involved in similar rumors in October 2014 (though the rumor was denied). Jang was eventually found not guilty of tax evasion as his agency had made an unintentional accounting mistake, but made a decision to leave the program and his scenes were edited out. He went on a hiatus in Korea after that, and focused largely on overseas activities.

That same year, Jang launched his directorial debut with the short film Camp, participating in the planning and directing stages in collaboration with director Yoon Hong-seung. Filmed in Jeju Island, Camp captures events that occur during Jang's attempts to film wild animals in the mountains as a documentary director. It topped the weekly film section of the Oricon Chart.

He expressed his desire to be recognized as an actor in Korea again, saying that "You may be a Hallyu star, but without a domestic base, it can feel empty." He announced that he will be selecting an "aggressive" range of movies and TV series to work on in 2016.

=== 2016–present: Comeback ===
Jang made a successful comeback in 2016 with Mnet's music survival show Produce 101, where 101 trainee girls competed against each other for their debut. He acted as the host and mentor of the show, making significant contributions toward introducing the program to viewers and making the program more suspenseful.

Jang then starred in the historical drama The Royal Gambler where he played a gambler who takes on the King. Though it had lower viewership ratings, the series marked a turning point in Jang's career and allowed him to overcome his fixed image as a "pretty boy" and expand his acting roles. The same year, Jang directed the short film The Great Legacy, which centers on a man who is obsessed with finding a bankbook left by his unconscious father. The film was invited for screening at the Bucheon International Fantastic Film Festival.

In 2017, Jang was cast in Kim Ki-duk's film Human, Space, Time and Human, about a journey to get to the root of being human while testing the limits of human emotions, morality, and ethics. In 2018, Jang returned to the small screen with the drama Switch - Change the World, playing double roles as a prosecutor and a con artist.

== Music career ==
Jang's first single as a singer, "Let Me Cry," was released by Pony Canyon in Japan on April 27, 2011. "Let Me Cry" debuted at number 1 on Japan's Oricon single charts, selling 119,149 copies on its first week of release, making him the first non-Japanese act to have the debut single to debut at number 1 on the charts. This won him Best New Artist in the 26th Japan Gold Disc Awards.

In September 2011, Jang teamed up with Big Brother (known as Team H) and released their first Chinese album, an EP titled The Lounge H Vol.1 in mainland China, Taiwan, Hong Kong and throughout Southeast Asia. The album eventually reached platinum sales. Team H later won Best Selling Album and Best Korean Album at the 2012 IFPI Hong Kong Record Sales Awards.

In March 2012, Team H released their second extended play Lounge H (The First Impression) exclusively in Japan. The album contained ten tracks of rock and electronic genre. In May 2012, Jang released his first full-length Japanese album, titled Just Crazy. It debuted at No. 1 on the Oricon daily singles chart with 53,000 copies sold, and again topped the weekly singles chart with 88,009 copies sold. Jang became the first male artist to top the Oricon Weekly Chart with a debut album, and the first time in Oricon history for a foreign male artist to claim such a feat in Japan. An eight-page advertisement promoting the album was awarded a prize by the Japanese Press Association. Jang then embarked on his second Asia tour to promote the album.

In February 2013, Team H released their third album titled I Just Wanna Have Fun in both Japan and China, which consists of 12 electronic tracks. The duo held their first concert, 2013 Team H Party - I Just Wanna Have Fun in Japan; and embarked on a series of concert throughout China, Thailand, Taiwan and America. In May 2013, Jang released his second Japanese album, Nature Boy, which consists of 11 tracks, including the promotional singles "Nature Boy" and "Indian Summer" as well as a self-written track titled "Love Letter". The album debuted at the top of the Oricon Daily Chart, selling 43,000 copies. From 2013 to 2014, Jang embarked on his first Zepp tour which traveled to different cities in Japan for a total of 14 concerts. In 2014, Jang project band, Team H, released its third full-length album titled Driving to the Highway consisting of fourteen tracks. The duo then embarked on a concert tour in Japan titled "Raining on the dance floor", which traveled to four different cities for a total of eight concerts.

In February 2015, Jang released his third solo album 'Monochrome' to celebrate his fifth anniversary in Japan. Monochrome placed third on both the 'Oricon' album daily and weekly chart. He also launched the 2015 "Jang Keun Suk The Cri Show 3" around Japan. The tour, which began with the Osaka concert on March 14, has completely sold out tickets for the 12 hall concerts in six cities (Osaka, Niigata, Fukuoka, Okayama, Shizuika, Hokkaido) and four arena concerts in two cities (Kobe, Tokyo), for a total of 16 concerts. In September 2015, Jang held the "Jang Keun Suk Live in Seoul 2015" concert at the Changchun Stadium in Seoul. It was Jang's first solo concert in Korea in three years. On October 24 Jang held a concert in Shanghai which was a comeback concert in China since 2013, followed by 4 concerts in Japan in the end of November.

In August 2016, Jang released a new Japanese single titled "Darling, Darling". Jang then kicked off his Asia tour "It's Show Time", performing in Seoul, Japan and China. He went on to unveil two more singles, "Endless Summer" and "Dakishimetai" the same year. In August 2017, Jang dropped his 4th full-length album Voyage with a total of 14 songs, including three singles released in 2016. The album took second place on the Oricon daily and weekly charts, selling over 21,000 copies the first day.

In March/April 2021, Jang released two new singles entitled "Star" and "Emotion" under EMI Records. On March 23, 2022, Jang released a teaser video for the title track "Running Through Time" of his new Japanese album Blooming. On August 11, 2022, Jang released the second teaser video for his new title track "Beautiful", which will be released on August 31.

== In the media ==
Jang is a self-styled "Prince of Asia", stating in February 2023: "I gave that title myself. I began spreading it. I told everyone, "I'm Prince of Asia"." He has enjoyed overwhelming popularity in the region, particularly China and Japan. In 2012, he became the first Hallyu star to be featured on a Japanese stamp. In 2013, his followers on Chinese networking social site Weibo surpassed 10 million, the greatest number of followers on Weibo for a Korean celebrity at the time.

== Personal life ==
=== Military service ===
Jang started his mandatory military service on July 16, 2018. He served as a social office worker following his diagnosis of bipolar disorder in 2011, which classified him as ineligible for active duty in the military. He served at Seoul Metropolitan Fire and Disaster Headquarters and completed his military service on May 29, 2020.

== Social activities ==
=== Ambassadorship ===
In 2010, Jang became the youngest person to be named PR Ambassador for Seoul. He was named promotional ambassador of the Nuclear Safety Summit in 2011. On 20 October 2015, Jang was appointed as one of the first domestic university "Sharing Professors" by Hanyang university. He held his first special lectures in December 2015.

In 2016, Jang was appointed as a public ambassador for the media art exhibition "Van Gogh Inside: Festival of Music and Light". In 2017, Jang was named honorary ambassador for the PyeongChang Olympics. For his service for the Olympics and Paralympics, he was awarded with a special medal.

=== Philanthropy ===
Jang often donates to charitable causes; in 2011 he donated 10.1 million yen from his charity event for its earthquake and tsunami victims to the Japanese Red Cross. In 2012 he donated an unprecedented sum of 1.2 billion won to his school, and in 2013 he donated 100 million won through UNICEF to help the victims of Typhoon Haiyan that devastated the Philippines. In 2017, it was revealed that he helped a Mongolian teenager get treatment for ovarian cancer in South Korea by helping to pay for the patient's trip and medical expenses.

His fanclub also makes donations frequently, such as to The Snail of Love, an organization that supports people with hearing impairments. and to the Namsanwon orphanage. In 2015, Jang volunteered at the said orphanage together with his fans.

In 2016, Jang stated that he wished to create a charity foundation to take his philanthropic activities a step further. In 2022, Jang donated 30 million to help deaf children by donating with fans through the Association for the Support of the Hearing Impaired. On February 9, 2023, Jang donated 100 million won to help 2023 Turkey–Syria earthquake, by donating money through Korea UNICEF Committee. In March 2025, Jang donated 100 million won through the Hope Bridge National Disaster Relief Association to help with recovery efforts from wildfires that have occurred in the Ulsan, Gyeongbuk, and Gyeongnam regions.

== Filmography ==
=== Film ===
Year	Title	Role	Notes/Ref.
2006	One Missed Call: Final	Ahn Jin-woo	Japanese film
2007	The Happy Life	Park Hyeon-jun	
2008	Do Re Mi Fa So La Ti Do	Shin Eun-gyu	
2008	Baby and I	Han Joon-soo	
2008	Crazy Waiting	Park Won-jae	
2009	The Case of Itaewon Homicide	Robert J. Pearson	
2011	Budapest Diary	Keun-Suk	Short film
2011	You're My Pet	Kang In-ho ("Momo")	
2015	Camp	Film director & lead role	Short film
2018	Human, Space, Time and Human	Adam	

=== Television series ===
Year	Title	Role	Notes/Ref.
1998	Hug	Won-joo	
2000	School 3	Kang Won-seok's younger brother	
2001	Ladies of the Palace	young Jeong Ryeom	
2001	Four Sisters	young Lee Young-hoon	
2002	Orange	Jang Keun-suk	
2002	The Great Ambition	young Park Si-young	
2003	Nonstop 4	Keun-suk	
2003	The Owl Museum	Lee Jung-woo	Drama Special
2005	Lovers in Prague	Yoon Gun-hee	
2006	Alien Teacher	Bong-sam/Alexander	
2006	Hwang Jini	Kim Eun-ho	
2008	Hong Gil-dong	Lee Chang-hwi	
2008	Beethoven Virus	Kang Gun-woo	
2009	You're Beautiful	Hwang Tae-kyung	
2010	Marry Me, Mary!	Kang Mu-gyul	
2011	Ikemen desu ne	Himself	Cameo, Episode 8
2012	Love Rain	Seo In-ha/Seo Joon	
2013	Bel Ami	Dokgo Ma-te	
2016	The Royal Gambler	Baek Dae-gil	
2017	A Korean Odyssey	Gong Jak	Cameo, Episode 3
2018	Switch	Sa Do-chan / Baek Joon-soo	
2024	The Influencer	Himself	
TBA	Hyupban	Ma Han-sang	

=== Web series ===
Year	Title	Role	Ref.
2023	Decoy	Goo Do-han	

=== Variety shows ===
Year	Title	Notes
2007	Inkigayo	Co-host with Kim Heechul
2012	The Center of the New Hallyu, I Am Jang Keun-suk	Reality show
2016	Produce 101	Mentor and MC
2016	Candy In My Ear	Cast
2024	Re:Born	MC
2026	Six Singles Under One Roof	Cast
2026	Director's Arena	Judge

=== Radio shows ===
Year	Title	Network	Role	Note	Ref.
2021	Kim Young-chul's Power FM	SBS Power FM	Special DJ	June 28	

== Bibliography ==
- 2012: Jang Keun Suk Love Recipe

== Accolades ==
=== Awards and nominations ===
Year	Award	Category	Nominated work	Result	Ref.
2006	Mnet Top 100	Charming Guys Who are Single	—N/a	Won	
2006	Mnet Top 100	Adorable Males	—N/a	Rank #29	
2006	KBS Drama Awards	Best Couple Award (with Ha Ji-won)	Hwang Jini	Won	
2006	KBS Drama Awards	Best New Actor	Hwang Jini	Nominated	
2007	Mnet Top 100	Must Have Males	—N/a	Rank #3	
2007	10th Director's Cut Awards	Best New Actor	The Happy Life	Won	
2007	28th Blue Dragon Film Awards	Best New Actor	The Happy Life	Nominated	
2007	6th Korean Film Awards	Best New Actor	The Happy Life	Nominated	
2008	44th Baeksang Arts Awards	Best New Actor (Film)	The Happy Life	Won	
2008	17th Buil Film Awards	Best New Actor	The Happy Life	Nominated	
2008	45th Grand Bell Awards	Best New Actor	The Happy Life	Nominated	
2008	2nd Korea Drama Awards	Excellence Award, Actor	Beethoven Virus	Nominated	
2008	MBC Drama Awards	Best New Actor	Beethoven Virus	Won	
2008	KBS Drama Awards	Excellence Award, Actor in a Miniseries	Hong Gil-dong	Nominated	
2008	KBS Drama Awards	Popularity Award, Actor	Hong Gil-dong	Won	
2009	46th Grand Bell Awards	Best Supporting Actor	The Case of Itaewon Homicide	Nominated	
2009	SBS Drama Awards	Excellence Award, Actor in a Drama Special	You're Beautiful	Nominated	
2009	SBS Drama Awards	Netizen Popularity Award	You're Beautiful	Won	
2009	SBS Drama Awards	Top 10 Stars	You're Beautiful	Won	
2010	46th Baeksang Arts Awards	Most Popular Actor (Film)	The Case of Itaewon Homicide	Won	
2010	Yahoo! Asia Buzz Awards	Top Buzz Male Korea Star	—N/a	Won	
2010	Yahoo! Asia Buzz Awards	Top Buzz Male Asia Star	—N/a	Won	
2010	KBS Drama Awards	Excellence Award, Actor in a Miniseries	Mary Stayed Out All Night	Nominated	
2010	KBS Drama Awards	Netizen Award, Actor	Mary Stayed Out All Night	Won	
2010	KBS Drama Awards	Best Couple Award (with Moon Geun-young)	Mary Stayed Out All Night	Won	
2011	15th Global Chinese Music Awards	Most Popular Korean Artist	—N/a	Won	
2011	3rd Asian Jewelry Awards	World Star Award	—N/a	Won	
2011	19th Korean Culture and Entertainment Awards	Hallyu Grand Prize	—N/a	Won	
2011	Yahoo! Asia Buzz Awards	Taiwan Top Searched Single Korean Artist	—N/a	Won	
2012	26th Japan Gold Disc Awards	Best 3 New Artists (with 2PM and B2ST)	—N/a	Won	
2012	10th IFPI Hong Kong Record Sales Awards	Best Selling Korean Album (with Big Brother)	The Lounge H Vol. 1	Won	
2012	48th Baeksang Arts Awards	Most Popular Actor (Film)	You're My Pet	Won	
2012	Huading Awards	Top 100 Asian Celebrities	—N/a	Rank #3	
2012	KBS Drama Awards	Excellence Award, Actor in a Mid-length Drama	Love Rain	Nominated	
2013	27th Japan Gold Disc Awards	Best 3 Albums	Just Crazy	Won	
2013	KBS Drama Awards	Excellence Award, Actor in a Miniseries	Bel Ami	Nominated	
2013	KBS Drama Awards	Best Couple Award (with IU)	Bel Ami	Nominated	
2016	5th APAN Star Awards	Best Actor in a Serial Drama (excellence award)	The Royal Gambler	Nominated	
2016	SBS Drama Awards	Grand Prize (Daesang)	The Royal Gambler	Nominated	
2016	SBS Drama Awards	Top Excellence Award, Actor in a Serial Drama	The Royal Gambler	Won	
2016	SBS Drama Awards	Top 10 Stars Award	The Royal Gambler	Won	
2022	2022 Seoul Social Welfare Contest	Seoul Mayor's Award	—N/a	Won	

=== State honors ===
Name of country, year given, and name of honor
Country	Year	Honor	Ref.
South Korea (Note: Honors are given at the Korean Popular Culture and Arts Awards, arranged by the Korea Creative Content Agency and hosted by the Ministry of Culture, Sports and Tourism. They are awarded to those who have contributed to the arts and South Korea's pop culture.)	2011	Minister of Culture, Sports and Tourism Commendation	
