= Med kroppen mot jorden =

Studio album by Lisa Ekdahl
- Released: March 1996
- Genre: Jazz, pop
- Length: 36:18
- Label: Alicia

Lisa Ekdahl chronology
| Lisa Ekdahl (1994) | Med kroppen mot jorden (1996) | Bortom det blå (1997) |

Med kroppen mot jorden is a 1996 Lisa Ekdahl studio album.

== Track listing ==
All song swritten by Lisa Ekdahl.

1. Inte kan ödet vara så hårt – 4:07
2. Himlen och jag – 4:02
3. Små onda djävlar – 3:33
4. Jag tror han är en ängel – 1:43
5. En sten i mitt hjärta – 3:36
6. Skäl att vara motvalls – 1:53
7. Ur askan i elden – 3:41
8. Jag har sett en fjäril – 2:39
9. Hösten – 4:43
10. Med kroppen mot jorden – 3:08
11. Att älska är större – 3:13

== Contributors ==
- Lisa Ekdahl – song, guitar
- Kenny Håkansson – guitar
- Bill Öhrström –congas, percussion, harmonica
- Patrik Boman – bass
- Jörgen Ringqvist – drums
- Peter Asplund –trumpet (track 3)
- Gunnar Nordén – guitar (track 4, 10), bass (track 8, 10)
- Nils Landgren –trombone (track 5)
- Christina Wirdegren–cello (track 11)

== Charts ==
| Chart (1996) | Peak position |
|---|---|
| Norwegian Albums (VG-lista) | 6 |
| Swedish Albums (Sverigetopplistan) | 1 |
