= En samling sånger =

Compilation album by Lisa Ekdahl
- Released: 2003
- Genre: Pop

En samling sånger is a compilation album by Swedish singer Lisa Ekdahl. It is entirely in the Swedish language.

== Track listing ==
1. "Nästa dag"
2. "Öppna upp ditt fönster"
3. "Med kroppen mot jorden"
4. "Vem vet"
5. "Bortom det blå"
6. "Sanningen i vitögat"
7. "Du var inte där för mig"
8. "Svag för din skönhet"
9. "Benen i kors"
10. "Skäl att vara motvalls"
11. "Du sålde våra hjärtan"
12. "Två lyckliga dårar"
13. "Jag tror han är en ängel"
14. "Sakta, sakta"
15. "Att älska är större"
16. "Papillas samba"
17. "Slumra in"

== Charts ==
Chart performance for En samling sånger
Chart (2003–2004)	Peak position
Danish Albums (Hitlisten)	4
Norwegian Albums (VG-lista)	13
Swedish Albums (Sverigetopplistan)	15
