= Baby & Me =

Japanese manga series

- First tankōbon volume cover, featuring Minoru Enoki (right) and Takuya Enoki (left)

赤ちゃんと僕 (Aka-chan to Boku)
- Genre: Comedy; Drama; Slice-of-life
- Manga
- Written by: Marimo Ragawa
- Published by: Hakusensha
- English publisher: NA: Viz Media
- Magazine: Hana to Yume
- English magazine: NA: Shojo Beat
- Original run: May 2, 1991 – June 20, 1997
- Volumes: 18
- Anime television series
- Directed by: Takahiro Omori
- Produced by: Noriko Kobayashi (TV Tokyo); Kyotaro Kimura (Yomiko); Reiko Fukakusa (Studio Pierrot)
- Written by: Sukehiro Tomita
- Music by: Kenji Kawai
- Studio: Studio Pierrot
- Licensed by: NA: AnimEigo
- Original network: TXN (TV Tokyo)
- Original run: July 11, 1996 – March 26, 1997
- Episodes: 35

Baby & Me (Japanese: 赤ちゃんと僕, Hepburn: Aka-chan to Boku) is a Japanese manga series written and illustrated by Marimo Ragawa. It was published in Hakusensha's magazine Hana to Yume from 1991 to 1997. In North America, it was published by Viz Media. In 1995, Baby & Me received the 40th Shogakukan Manga Award in the shōjo category. An anime adaptation by Studio Pierrot aired on TV Tokyo and its affiliates from July 1996 to March 1997.

A South Korean film adaptation of the anime, Baby and I, was released in 2008. As of November 2021, the manga had over 17.7 million copies in circulation.

In 2026, it was announced that AnimEigo will release the series on Blu-ray in 2027.

== Plot ==
Takuya Enoki lost his mother, Yukako, in a car accident. He now lives with his father, Harumi, and two-year-old little brother, Minoru. Although Takuya is only an elementary school student, he not only does all the housework, but takes care of his little brother. When the Kimura family blames him for Minoru's constant crying one day, his stress gradually builds up. A frustrated Takuya cannot help feeling upset over Minoru, who is stressing him and taking up all his time.

Later, Takuya picks Minoru up from preschool and saves him from a brutal dog that blocked Minoru's way. After coming home and seeing Minoru crying, Takuya realizes that Minoru is just lonely and becomes ashamed of himself. From now on, Takuya learns to care for his little brother.

== Characters ==
=== Enoki family ===
Takuya Enoki (榎木 拓也, Enoki Takuya)
Voiced by: Kappei Yamaguchi
Takuya is a caring and hard-working 12-year-old elementary schoolboy who has taken the responsibility of caring younger brother, Minoru, since their mother's death.
Minoru Enoki (榎木 実, Enoki Minoru)
Voiced by: Chika Sakamoto
Minoru is Takuya's two-year-old younger brother.
Harumi Enoki (榎木 春美, Enoki Harumi)
Voiced by: Mitsuru Miyamoto
Harumi is Takuya and Minoru's father, who works hard to feed his family. He is a system engineer who is popular in his company. Harumi cares for his two sons very much.
Yukako Enoki (榎木 由加子, Enoki Yukako)
Voiced by: Misa Watanabe
Yukako is the deceased mother of Takuya and Minoru. Harumi, against her family's wishes, escaped her family in doing so.

=== Friends ===
Tadashi "Gon" Gotō (後藤 正, Gotō Tadashi)
Voiced by: Yoshiko Kamei
Tadashi is Takuya's greedy and lazy classmate. Like Takuya, he acts as the older brother in his family, taking care of his younger sister Hiroko. His family works at a grocery store, where Tadashi often works.
Hiroko "Hiro" Gotō (後藤 浩子, Gotō Hiroko; ヒロ Hiro)
Voiced by: Yumi Kuroda
Hiroko is Tadashi's younger sister of Tadashi, who goes to the same preschool as Minoru. She has a crush on him after he saves her from a dog.
Tokio Tamadate (玉館 時男, Tamadate Tokio)
Voiced by: Chika Sakamoto
Tokio is Takuya's stuck-up rich classmate who wears expensive designer clothes. He regularly teases Takuya and considers Gon as his rival.

=== Fujii family ===
Akemi Fujii (藤井 明美, Fujii Akemi)
Voiced by: Misa Watanabe
The oldest daughter in the family, Akemi, is in charge of her other siblings as their parents constantly work.
Tomoya Fujii (藤井 友也, Fujii Tomoya)
Voiced by: Mitsuo Iwata
Tomoya is the oldest son and second-oldest child in the Fujii family. He is a dirty-minded and loud, yet positive-thinking 17-year-old boy who is popular at school.
Asako Fujii (藤井 浅子, Fujii Asako)
Voiced by: Akemi Okamura
Asako is the second oldest daughter and third child in the Fujii family. She is a cold 15-year-old girl who feels jealous of Tomoya's cheerful personality.
Akihiro Fujii (藤井 昭広, Fujii Akihiro)
Voiced by: Hiro Yuuki
Akihiro is the fourth child in the Fujii family. He is Takuya's intelligent and thoughtful classmate who is deemed cool in class.
Ichika Fujii (藤井 一加, Fujii Ichika)
Voiced by: Mika Kanai
Ichika is the fifth child in the Fujii family who has a crush on Minoru and often fights with Hiro. She is intelligent yet sharp-tongued.
Masaki "Ma-Bo" Fujii (藤井 正樹, Fujii Masaki; マー坊 Mā-bō)
Voiced by: Kazumi Okushima
Masaki is the gentle and intelligent youngest child in the Fujii family.

=== Other characters ===
Shinako Fukaya (深谷 しな子, Fukaya Shinako)
Voiced by: Michiko Neya
Shinako is one of Takuya's classmates with a quick temper. Her reputation as a liar makes it hard for her to have friends. Shinako frequently speaks too honestly, and words come out of her mouth before she thinks it through, leading her to hurt others' feelings without meaning to.
Megumi Yarimizo (槍溝 愛, Yarimizo Megumi)
Voiced by: Hinako Kanamaru
Ai is the class representative of Class 6-3 with a crush on Gon.

== Media ==
1. ISBN 4-592-12241-0 published in March 1992
2. ISBN 4-592-12242-9 published in August 1992
3. ISBN 4-592-12243-7 published in December 1992
4. ISBN 4-592-12244-5 published in February 1993
5. ISBN 4-592-12245-3 published in June 1993
6. ISBN 4-592-12246-1 published in November 1993
7. ISBN 4-592-12247-X published in March 1994
8. ISBN 4-592-12248-8 published in July 1994
9. ISBN 4-592-12249-6 published in November 1994
10. ISBN 4-592-12250-X published in February 1992
11. ISBN 4-592-12821-4 published in May 1995
12. ISBN 4-592-12822-2 published in September 1995
13. ISBN 4-592-12823-0 published in January 1996
14. ISBN 4-592-12824-9 published in July 1996
15. ISBN 4-592-12825-7 published in November 1996
16. ISBN 4-592-12826-5 published in March 1997
17. ISBN 4-592-12827-3 published in June 1997
18. ISBN 4-592-12828-1 published in September 1997

== Episodes ==
No.	Title	Directed by	Written by	Storyboards	Animation director	Original release date
1	"I Hate Crybaby!!"; Transliteration: "Nakimushi wa Kirai da!!" (Japanese: 泣き虫は嫌いだ！！)	Jun Takada	Sukehiro Tomita	Takahiro Ōmori	Yūji Moriyama	July 11, 1996
Tired of Minoru's crying sound, Takuya decides to go to school.
2	"I Don't Need Mom!!"; Transliteration: "Mama Nante Iranai!!" (Japanese: ママなんていらない！！)	Masakatsu Ījima	Kenji Terada	Gō Sakamoto	Yoshihiko Takakura	July 18, 1996
3	"Gon is a Younger Brother?"; Transliteration: "Gon-chan no Otōto?" (Japanese: ゴンちゃんのおとうと？)	Hiroshi Kawashima	Yukiyoshi Ōhashi	Kazuyuki Honda	Keiko Hayashi	July 25, 1996
4	"Minoru's Mischievous Drawing"; Transliteration: "Minoru no Itazura Kaki" (Japanese: 実のいたずら書き)	Jun Takada	Shigeru Yanagawa	Jun Takada	Megumi Kadonosono	August 1, 1996
Minoru draws a mysterious picture which Takuya dislikes.
5	"Minoru Likes Someone?!"; Transliteration: "Minoru wa Dareka Suki!?" (Japanese: 実はだれが好き！？)	Masakatsu Ījima	Sukehiro Tomita	Masakatsu Ījima	Moriyasu Taniguchi	August 8, 1996
6	"The Day Everyone Went to the Sea"; Transliteration: "Minna de Umi e Itta Hi" (Japanese: みんなで海へ行った日)	Tatsuya Ishihara	Yukiyoshi Ōhashi	Tatsuya Ishihara	Kazumi Ikeda	August 15, 1996
Takuya goes to the beach alongside his family and friends.
7	"Ghost Stories: Mysterious Girl"; Transliteration: "Kaidan: Fushigi na Onna-no-ko" (Japanese: 怪談・ふしぎな女の子)	Shōichi Masuo	Kenji Terada	Hidehito Ueda (as Baku Tsuzuri)	Hiroki Takagi	August 22, 1996
8	"Fireworks Night"; Transliteration: "Hanabi no Yoru" (Japanese: 花火の夜)	Hiroshi Kawashima	Shigeru Yanagawa	Kazuyuki Honda	Keiko Hayashi	August 29, 1996
9	"Soap Laundry Squad 5!!"; Transliteration: "Sentaku Sentai Shabon 5!!" (Japanese: 洗濯戦隊 シャボン5！！)	Jun Takada	Yukiyoshi Ōhashi	Jun Takada	Yoshihiko Takakura	September 5, 1996
10	"Minoru Can Do Anything!!"; Transliteration: "Minoru de Nandemo Kirumon!!" (Japanese: 実のなんでもできるもん！！)	Masakatsu Ījima	Sukehiro Tomita	Masakatsu Ījima	Moriyasu Taniguchi	September 12, 1996
11	"Exciting Neighborhood Sports Day"; Transliteration: "Uki-uki Chōnai Undōkai" (Japanese: うきうき町内運動会)	Tatsuya Ishihara	Kenji Terada	Tatsuya Ishihara	Kazumi Ikeda	September 19, 1996
12	"Nervous!! Ghosts are Scary!"; Transliteration: "Biku-biku!! Obake Kowaī!" (Japanese: ビクビク！！お化け怖いー！)	Takuo Suzuki	Shigeru Yanagawa	Kazuyuki Honda	Keiko Hayashi	September 26, 1996
13	"Sachiko the Rabbit"; Transliteration: "Usagi no Sachiko-chan" (Japanese: うさぎのさちこちゃん)	Takahiro Ōmori	Masashi Yokoyama	Takahiro Ōmori	Hiroki Takagi	October 10, 1996
14	"Cheer Up, Teacher Enchō!"; Transliteration: "Enchō-sensei Ganbaru!" (Japanese: 園長先生がんばる！)	Shinya Sadamitsu	Yukiyoshi Ōhashi	Shinya Sadamitsu	Hiroki Takagi	October 17, 1996
15	"My Dad is My Grandpa?"; Transliteration: "Otōsan wa Ojīchan?" (Japanese: おとうさんはおじいちゃん？)	Jun Takada	Masashi Yokoyama	Jun Takada	Yoshihiko Takakura	October 12, 1996
16	"Get Well Soon, Brodie"; Transliteration: "Nī-cha, Genki ni nāre" (Japanese: にーちゃ、元気になぁれ)	Tatsuya Ishihara	Sukehiro Tomita	Tatsuya Ishihara	Kazumi Ikeda	October 31, 1996
17	"Fujii's Halloween"; Transliteration: "Harouin na Fujii-kun" (Japanese: ハロウィンな藤井君)	Takuo Suzuki	Kenji Terada	Kazuyuki Honda	Keiko Hayashi	November 7, 1996
18	"Brother Gon-chan!! A Tearful First Love"; Transliteration: "Otoko Gon-chan!! Namida no Hatsukoi" (Japanese: 男ゴンちゃん！！涙の初恋)	Masakatsu Ījima	Shigeru Yanagawa	Hidehito Ueda (as Baku Tsuzuri)	Yuri Chiaki	November 14, 1996
19	"Starving Incident"; Transliteration: "Onaka Pekopeko Jiken" (Japanese: おなかペコペコ事件)	Shin'ya Sadamitsu	Masashi Yokoyama	Shin'ya Sadamitsu	Takayuki Gotō	November 21, 1996
20	"The Day Brodie Cried"; Transliteration: "Nī-cha no Naita Hi" (Japanese: にーちゃの泣いた日)	Jun Takada	Kenji Terada	Jun Takada	Hiroki Takagi	November 28, 1996
21	"I Found Christmas"; Transliteration: "Kurisumasu Mitsuketa" (Japanese: クリスマス みつけた)	Tatsuya Ishihara	Yukiyoshi Ōhashi	Tatsuya Ishihara	Kazumi Ikeda	December 5, 1996
22	"What!? A Set-up by Daddy?"; Transliteration: "E!? Papa ga Omiai?" (Japanese: え！？パパがお見合い？)	Takuo Suzuki	Sukehiro Tomita	Kazunari Kume	Keiko Hayashi	December 12, 1996
23	"Secret Bed-making"; Transliteration: "Naisho no Onesho" (Japanese: ないしょのおねしょ)	Tatsuya Ishihara	Sukehiro Tomita	Tatsuya Ishihara	Kazumi Ikeda	December 19, 1996
24	"The Return of Dragon Son"; Transliteration: "Kaettekita Dora Musuko" (Japanese: 帰ってきたドラ息子)	Shin'ya Sadamitsu	Sukehiro Tomita	Takahiro Ōmori	Takayuki Gotō	January 8, 1997
25	"Actually, I Become an Older Brother"; Transliteration: "Jitsu, Onīchan ni naru" (Japanese: 実、おにーちゃんになる)	Jun Takada	Yukiyoshi Ōhashi	Jun Takada	Hiroki Takagi	January 15, 1997
26	"Thumping!? Sumo Tournament"; Transliteration: "Dosukoi!? Sumō Taikai" (Japanese: どすこい！？すもう大会)	Hiroshi Hara	Shigeru Yanagawa	Kazuyuki Honda	Keiko Hayashi	January 22, 1997
27	"Super Grandma Appears!!"; Transliteration: "Sūpā Obāchan Tōjō！！" (Japanese: スーパーおばあちゃん登場!!)	Yoshiko Shima	Kenji Terada	Yoshiko Shima	Kazumi Ikeda	January 29, 1997
28	"Adventures of Minoru the Hero"; Transliteration: "Yūsha Minoru no Daibōken" (Japanese: 勇者みのるの大冒険)	Masakatsu Ījima	Sukehiro Tomita	Masakatsu Ījima	Takako Ōnishi	February 5, 1997
29	"Heartwarming Valentine's Day"; Transliteration: "Kokoro Sowasowa Barentain Dē" (Japanese: 心そわそわバレンタインデー)	Shin'ya Sadamitsu	Yukiyoshi Ōhashi	Hidehito Ueda (as Baku Tsuzuri)	Yuri Chiaki	February 12, 1997
30	"Real Rad Car"; Transliteration: "Mi no Akai Jidōsha" (Japanese: 実の赤い自動車)	Yoshiko Shima	Shigeru Yanagawa	Yoshiko Shima	Kazumi Ikeda	February 19, 1997
31	"Daddy's Time Capsule"; Transliteration: "Papa no Taimu Kapuseru" (Japanese: パパのタイムカプセル)	Jun Takada	Masashi Yokoyama	Jun Takada	Masako Gotō	February 26, 1997
32	"First Drive is Heart-pounding!!"; Transliteration: "Hatsu Doraibu wa Doki-doki!!" (Japanese: 初ドライブはドキドキ！！)	Hiroshi Hara	Yukiyoshi Ōhashi	Kazuyuki Honda	Keiko Hayashi	March 5, 1997
33	"Panic Mumps!"; Transliteration: "Atafuta! Otafuku kaze" (Japanese: あたふた！おたふくかぜ)	Masakatsu Ījima	Shigeru Yanagawa	Masakatsu Ījima	Takako Ōnishi	March 12, 1997
34	"Tebradesky's Little Bird"; Transliteration: "Kotori no Teburadesukī" (Japanese: 小鳥のテブラデスキー)	Masakatsu Ījima	Shigeru Yanagawa	Hidehito Ueda (as Baku Tsuzuri)	Yuri Chiaki	March 19, 1997
35	"Alone At Night"; Transliteration: "Hitoripotchi no Orusuban" (Japanese: 一人ぽっちのおるすばん)	Shin'ya Sadamitsu	Sukehiro Tomita	Jun Takada	Rie Nishino	March 26, 1997

== Reception ==
Baby & Me won the 40th Shogakukan Manga Award in the shōjo category in 1995. As of November 2021, the manga had over 17.7 million copies in circulation.
