= Sings Salvadore Poe =

Studio album by Lisa Ekdahl
- Released: 2001
- Genre: Jazz
- Label: BMG

Lisa Ekdahl chronology
Bortom det blå (1997)	Sings Salvadore Poe (2001)

Sings Salvadore Poe is an album by Swedish singer Lisa Ekdahl, released in 2001. The music on the album is a mixture of latin jazz, easy listening and bossa nova. Salvadore Poe was Ekdahl's husband at the time and is also known for writing film music and as guitarist in 1990s hard rock band Spread Eagle.

There are several releases of this album, all from BMG, some with bonus tracks.

== Regular release track listing ==
All songs written by Salvadore Poe.

1. "Daybreak"
2. "Rivers of Love"
3. "Sunny Weather"
4. "Only You"
5. "The Color of You"
6. "How Many More Times"
7. "I Will Be Blessed"
8. "Since You've Been Gone"
9. "I've Never Seen Anything Like You"
10. "I Don't Miss You Anymore"
11. "Nightingale"
12. "The Rhythm of Our Hearts"
13. "Sun Rose"
14. "Of My Conceit"
15. "Aurore" (bonus track)

== Charts ==
Chart (2000–2001)	Peak position
Danish Albums (Hitlisten)	30
French Albums (SNEP)	41
Norwegian Albums (VG-lista)	11
Swedish Albums (Sverigetopplistan)	20
