= Bortom det blå =

Studio album by Lisa Ekdahl
- Released: March 1997
- Genre: jazz, pop
- Length: 41:07
- Label: Alicia

Lisa Ekdahl chronology
Med kroppen mot jorden (1996)	Bortom det blå (1997)	Sings Salvadore Poe (2000)

Bortom det blå is an album by Swedish singer Lisa Ekdahl. It is entirely in the Swedish language.

== Track listing ==
1. Bortom det blå
2. Gå dit ifall du minns
3. Två lyckliga dårar
4. Jag behöver inget mer
5. Vi tillhör varann
6. Sakta sakta
7. Jag vill bara vara
8. Du var inte där för mig
9. Hyenorna skrattade gamarna
10. Genom dig ser jag ljuset
11. Cirklar
12. Vill ha dig kvar
13. Tänk inte mera
14. Natten skyddar de älskande

== Charts ==
Chart (1997)	Peak position
Norwegian Albums (VG-lista)	12
Swedish Albums (Sverigetopplistan)	6
