= Jung Woon-sun =

South Korean actress (born 1983)

- Born: 10 April 1983 (age 43); South Korea
- Other name: Jung Woon-seon
- Education: Dongguk University (Bachelor of Theater)
- Occupation: Actress
- Years active: 2002–present
- Agents: Ace Factory; Mystic Story
- Known for: Happiness; Forecasting Love and Weather

Jung Woon-sun (Korean: 정운선; born April 10, 1983) is a South Korean actress. She is known for her roles in dramas such as Happiness and Forecasting Love and Weather. She also appeared movies Phone, The Case of Itaewon Homicide and The Sword with No Name.

== Biography and career ==
She was encouraged by her teacher in second year of elementary school to try acting and suggested it to her parents. She started working as a child actress in educational programs but she couldn't attend school regularly so her parents forced her to quit it and so she focus on her studies. She attended Dongguk University there she studied theatre after graduating. She signed with Ace Factory and started working in dramas, musical shows and theatre.

== Filmography ==
=== Television series ===
Year	Title	Role	Ref.
2021	Happiness	Shin So-yoon	
2022	Forecasting Love and Weather	Jin Tae-kyung	
2023	Agency	Bae Won-hee	
2023	Lies Hidden in My Garden	Oh Hae-soo	
2023	Daily Dose of Sunshine	Oh Ri-na	
2024	O'PENing: Our Beautiful Summer	Shin Yu-na	
2024	Dongjae, the Good or the Bastard	Kim Ji-hui	
2025	Resident Playbook	Oh Joo-young	

=== Film ===
Year	Title	Role	Ref.
2002	R.U Ready?	Jung-un	
2002	Phone	High School Student	
2009	The Case of Itaewon Homicide	Jung-pil's elder sister	
2009	The Sword with No Name	Ja Young's waiting lady	
2024	Dead Man	Jeon Soo-hyeon	

== Stage ==
=== Musical ===
List of Musical Work(s)
Year	Title	Korean Title	Role
2010	My Heart's Flair Season 3	내 마음의 풍금 시즌 3	Choi Hong-yeon
2010	Harmony in my heart - Jeju	내 마음의 풍금 - 제주	Choi Hong-yeon
2010	Finding Jongwook Kim - Gangnam	김종욱 찾기 - 강남	Woman looking for first love
2011	Finding Jongwook Kim - Jinju	김종욱 찾기 - 진주	Woman looking for first love
2011	Finding Jongwook Kim - Ulsan	김종욱 찾기 - 울산	Woman looking for first love
2011	Wind In My Heart	내 마음의 풍금	Choi Hong-yeon
2011	Harmony In My Heart - Busan	내 마음의 풍금 - 부산	Choi Hong-yeon
2012	Black Mary Poppins	블랙메리포핀스	Anna
2016	Hi! UFO	안녕! 유에프오	Yoo-kyung
2017	Me and Natasha and the White Donkey	나와 나타샤와 흰 당나귀	Sleepy
2019	Island: 1933–2019	섬: 1933~2019	White Suseon / Margaret
2020	Me and Natasha and the White Donkey	나와 나타샤와 흰 당나귀	Sleepy
2021	Showman_A certain Dictator's Fourth Double Actor	쇼맨_어느 독재자의 네 번째 대역배우	Sua
2021	Taeil	태일	Taeil's voice

=== Theatre ===
List of Theater Work(s)
Year	Title	Korean Title	Role
2012	Mokran's sister	목란언니	Jomokran
2012	Our Town	아워 타운	Emily
2013	Mokran's sister	목란언니	Jomokran
2014	Glass Zoo	유리동물원	Laura
2014	Lack Of a Family Name	가족이란 이름의 부족	Sylvia
2015	Glass Zoo	유리동물원	Laura
2015	Speaking in Tongues	스피킹 인 텅스	Jane / Sarah
2015	Test	시련	Abigail
2017	Kill Me Now	킬 미 나우	Twila
2017	Blind	블라인드	Number of animals
2018	Doll's House	인형의 집	Nora
2019	Pride and Prejudice	오만과 편견	A1
2020	Pride and Prejudice	오만과 편견	A1
2021	Pride and Prejudice - Uijeongbu	오만과 편견 - 의정부	A1
2021	Pride and Prejudice - Uplifting	오만과 편견 - 고양	A1

== Awards and nominations ==
Name of the award ceremony, year presented, category, nominee of the award, and the result of the nomination
Year	Award	Category	Nominee / Work	Result	Ref.
2012	49th Dong-A Theater Awards	Yoo In-chon Rookie of the Year Award	Mokran's sister	Won	
