= Those Snow White Notes =

Japanese manga series

- First volume cover

ましろのおと (Mashiro no Oto)
- Genre: Coming-of-age, drama
- Manga
- Written by: Marimo Ragawa
- Published by: Kodansha
- English publisher: NA: Kodansha USA
- Magazine: Monthly Shōnen Magazine
- Original run: December 5, 2009 – August 5, 2022
- Volumes: 31
- Anime television series
- Directed by: Hiroaki Akagi
- Written by: Kan'ichi Katō
- Studio: Shin-Ei Animation
- Licensed by: Crunchyroll; SEA: Mighty Media
- Original network: MBS, TBS, BS-TBS
- Original run: April 3, 2021 – June 19, 2021
- Episodes: 12
- icon

Those Snow White Notes (Japanese: ましろのおと, Hepburn: Mashiro no Oto) is a Japanese manga series written and illustrated by Marimo Ragawa. It was serialized in Kodansha's shōnen manga magazine Monthly Shōnen Magazine from December 2009 to August 2022, and has been collected in thirty-one tankōbon volumes. An anime television series adaptation produced by Shin-Ei Animation aired from April 3 to June 19, 2021, on the Animeism programming block.

== Characters ==
=== Tsugaru Shamisen Appreciation Club ===
Setsu Sawamura (澤村雪, Sawamura Setsu)
Voiced by: Nobunaga Shimazaki
Shuri Maeda (前田朱利, Maeda Shuri)
Voiced by: Yume Miyamoto
Yui Yamazato (山里結, Yamazato Yui)
Voiced by: Reina Kondō
Kaito Yaguchi (矢口海人, Yaguchi Kaito)
Voiced by: Nobuhiko Okamoto
Rai Nagamori (永森雷, Nagamori Rai)
Voiced by: Tatsuhisa Suzuki
Keiko Koyabu (小薮啓子, Koyabu Keiko)
Voiced by: Tomoyo Takayanagi

=== Other characters ===
Wakana Sawamura (澤村若菜, Sawamura Wakana)
Voiced by: Yoshimasa Hosoya
Umeko Sawamura (澤村梅子, Sawamura Umeko)
Voiced by: Takako Honda
Seiryū Kamiki (神木清流, Kamiki Seiryū)
Voiced by: Yūichirō Umehara
Sōichi Tanuma (田沼総一, Tanuma Sōichi)
Voiced by: Tasuku Hatanaka
Mai Tanuma (田沼舞, Tanuma Mai)
Voiced by: Shiori Mikami
Yuna Tachiki (立樹ユナ, Tachiki Yuna)
Voiced by: Rikako Aida
Ushio Arakawa (荒川潮, Arakawa Ushio)
Voiced by: Fukushi Ochiai
Takaomi Kaji (梶貴臣, Kaji Takaomi)
Voiced by: Yuki Kaji
Sakura Yamano (山野桜, Yamano Sakura)
Voiced by: Yuna Taniguchi
Matsugorō Sawamura (澤村松吾郎, Sawamura Matsugorō)
Voiced by: Tomohisa Asou
Hiroshi Ōtawara (大俵ヒロシ, Ōtawara Hiroshi)
Voiced by: Kyōya Kimura
Taketo (タケト, Taketo)
Voiced by: Tetsuya Kakihara

== Media ==
=== Manga ===
The manga is written and illustrated by Marimo Ragawa. The series was serialized in Kodansha's Monthly Shōnen Magazine from December 5, 2009, to August 5, 2022. Kodansha compiled its chapters into 31 individual tankōbon volumes. The first volume was published on October 15, 2010 and the final volume was published on October 17, 2022. An omnibus edition with the first three volumes released in Japan on March 17, 2021.

Kodansha USA has licensed the manga for digital release in North America.

==== Volumes ====
No.	Original release date	Original ISBN	English release date	English ISBN
1	October 15, 2010	978-4-06-371261-2	March 30, 2021	978-1-63-699042-2
2	December 17, 2010	978-4-06-371266-7	April 6, 2021	978-1-63-699043-9
3	April 15, 2011	978-4-06-371281-0	April 27, 2021	978-1-63-699044-6
4	September 16, 2011	978-4-06-371298-8	May 11, 2021	978-1-63-699096-5
5	January 17, 2012	978-4-06-371316-9	May 25, 2021	978-1-63-699111-5
6	June 15, 2012	978-4-06-371334-3	June 8, 2021	978-1-63-699147-4
7	November 16, 2012	978-4-06-371353-4	June 22, 2021	978-1-63-699161-0
8	April 17, 2013	978-4-06-371371-8	July 6, 2021	978-1-63-699211-2
9	October 17, 2013	978-4-06-371393-0	September 5, 2023	978-1-68-491196-7
10	February 17, 2014	978-4-06-371411-1	October 3, 2023	978-1-68-491366-4
11	June 17, 2014	978-4-06-371425-8	November 21, 2023	979-8-88-933264-0
12	October 17, 2014	978-4-06-371443-2	December 12, 2023	979-8-88-933286-2
13	April 17, 2015	978-4-06-371466-1	January 9, 2024	979-8-88-933316-6
14	August 17, 2015	978-4-06-371479-1	February 6, 2024	979-8-88-933369-2
15	February 17, 2016	978-4-06-392510-4	March 5, 2024	979-8-88-933407-1
16	October 17, 2016	978-4-06-392558-6	April 2, 2024	979-8-88-933432-3
17	March 17, 2017	978-4-06-392572-2	May 7, 2024	979-8-88-933433-0
18	July 14, 2017	978-4-06-392594-4	June 4, 2024	979-8-88-933563-4
19	November 17, 2017	978-4-06-510443-9	July 2, 2024	979-8-88-933618-1
20	April 17, 2018	978-4-06-511296-0	August 6, 2024	979-8-88-933690-7
21	October 17, 2018	978-4-06-513377-4	October 1, 2024	979-8-89-478008-5
22	February 15, 2019	978-4-06-514490-9	November 5, 2024	979-8-89-478099-3
23	July 17, 2019	978-4-06-516590-4	December 3, 2024	979-8-89-478157-0
24	November 15, 2019	978-4-06-517627-6	January 7, 2025	979-8-89-478295-9
25	May 15, 2020	978-4-06-519297-9	February 4, 2025	979-8-89-478363-5
26	November 17, 2020	978-4-06-521495-4	March 4, 2025	979-8-89-478427-4
27	March 17, 2021	978-4-06-522731-2	April 1, 2025	979-8-89-478486-1
28	July 15, 2021	978-4-06-523932-2	May 6, 2025	979-8-89-478487-8
29	December 16, 2021	978-4-06-526123-1	June 3, 2025	979-8-89-478488-5
30	July 14, 2022	978-4-06-528532-9	July 1, 2025	979-8-89-478489-2
31	October 17, 2022	978-4-06-529430-7; 978-4-06-529429-1 (SE)	August 5, 2025	979-8-89-478490-8

=== Anime ===
An anime television series adaptation was announced in the September issue of Monthly Shōnen Magazine on August 6, 2020. The series is animated by Shin-Ei Animation and directed by Hiroaki Akagi, with Kan'ichi Katō handling series composition, and Jiro Mashima designing the characters. The Yoshida Brothers will supervise the tsugaru-jamisen music in the anime. The two opening theme songs "Blizzard" and "Ginsekai" (Silver World) was performed by Burnout Syndromes, while the ending theme song "Kono Yume ga Sameru Made" (Until I Wake From Dreaming) was performed by Miliyah Kato and the Yoshida Brothers. The series aired from April 3 to June 19, 2021, on the Animeism programming block on MBS, TBS, and BS-TBS. Crunchyroll streamed the series outside of Southeast Asia. Mighty Media has licensed the series in Southeast Asian territories.

==== Episodes ====
No.	Title (Note: All English titles are taken from Crunchyroll.)	Directed by (Note: Information is taken from the ending credits of each episode.)	Written by	Original release date
1	"Desolate"; Transliteration: "Sekibaku" (Japanese: 寂寞)	Naoki Murata	Kan'ichi Katō	April 3, 2021 (Note: This episode was pre-screened on April 2, 2021, on Amazon Prime Video Japan.)
Shortly after the death of his grandfather Matsugorō Sawamura, who was an accomplished shamisen player, Setsu Sawamura leaves Aomori and moves to Tokyo having lost his passion for the shamisen. He bumps into the aspiring actress Yuna Tachiki, and after collapsing in the streets of Roppongi, he is taken to her apartment. The next day they hang out with her friend Taketo, a guitar player for a rock band. That night, Setsu plays the shamisen in the park and recalls that he stopped playing the shamisen because of his grandfather's dying wish. On the next day right before Taketo's concert, Taketo takes his anger out on Setsu, causing the attendees to become restless due to the delay in the start of his concert. Needing time for Taketo to calm down, Setsu performs the shamisen in an impromptu opening act performance, which goes viral. At the start of spring, Yuna moves out and reveals to Setsu that she was unhappy with her talent agency and left it to pursue a better career opportunity.
2	"Apple Blossoms"; Transliteration: "Ringo no Hana" (Japanese: 林檎の花)	Kyoung Soon Park	Kan'ichi Katō	April 10, 2021
Setsu's mother Umeko Sawamura drags an unconscious Setsu to his new home inside a boarding house. After Setsu wakes up, he performs the shamisen with Umeko singing, attracting an audience. However, the performance ends with Setsu accidentally breaking one of the strings and despite that, he won the approval of the neighborhood that permits him to practice his shamisen at home. The next day, Setsu begins school at Umezono Academy and makes a friend in Shuri Maeda, who is also very interested in the shamisen and also found a broken shamisen left in the music prep room. After school, Setsu is given a new shamisen case by his older brother Wakana, who is supportive of his decision to move to Tokyo. The two then perform at a local park and Setsu feels his close bond with Wakana while playing. Afterwards, Wakana gives his blessing to Setsu while preparing to return to Aomori.
3	"Sudden Downpour"; Transliteration: "Shūu" (Japanese: 驟雨)	Takuo Suzuki	Kan'ichi Katō	April 17, 2021 (Note: This episode aired at 2:40 a.m. JST, 15 minutes after the original air time.)
Shuri is then caught listening to Matsugoro's improvisation shamisen song Shungyou, leading Setsu to ask her about how she came to know that song. Shuri reveals that her grandmother first met Matsugoro back when she was a kid having evacuated to the countryside, and that she formed the Tsugaru Shamisen Appreciation Club hoping to find someone who understands the meaning of that song. However, with the song being improvised and changing with each performance, Setsu tells Shuri to give up on it. This response prompts Shuri's friends Yui Yamazoto and Kaito Yaguchi to join, with Keiko Koyabu becoming the club's advisor. Koyabu reveals that the broken shamisen found in the clubroom belonged to school alum Kousuke Ogata, known by his stage name Kamiki Seiryuu. To ask about the shamisen, the club attends one of his concerts and asks him afterwards. Seiryuu's response that he does not care about it being played again angers Setsu, and in response Seiryuu asks Setsu to play for him with Setsu giving a substandard performance. Setsu becomes lost in thought, but is convinced to play for Shuri's grandmother.
4	"Spring Dawn"; Transliteration: "Haru no Akatsuki" (Japanese: 春の暁)	Masamune Hirata	Aki Itami	April 24, 2021
Having accepted Shuri's request to perform Shungyou, Setsu scrambles to learn how to play that song, but comes to realize that he is incapable of playing it. However, Wakana tells Setsu that because Shuri and her grandmother do not realize the song's difficulty that he should focus on performing his own version. As he practices his song, he realizes the skill gap between himself and Matsugoro, but understands the importance of making the song his own. At the performance, he plays his modified version of Shungyou for Shuri's grandmother, and she reflects on the time when she first met Matsugoro when she evacuated to the countryside at age six. Despite being able to easily tell that this version is not the same version she remembers, she expresses her appreciation and explains the qualities that she remembers from meeting Matsugoro and how it was crafted into his performance, while Setsu responds by explaining why that is a difficult song to master. This performance inspires Shuri to keep the club going. Meanwhile, Umeko arranges to have Setsu enter the Matsugorou Cup, a high school shamisen competition.
5	"Playing Together"; Transliteration: "Gassō" (Japanese: 合奏)	Masahiko Watanabe	Hiroko Fukuda	May 1, 2021
Rai Nagamori, who is experienced with a different style of shamisen, joins the club as they are set to enter the Matsugorou Cup as a team. Setsu becomes the club's teacher, but frustrated by the club's inability to produce a decent sound, as well as his unwillingness to lower his standards for them, Setsu quits the role. Setsu returns home and is greeted by Umeko, who is pressuring Setsu to enter the individual competition of the Matsugorou Cup causing him to get in a heated argument. The next day, Setsu apologizes to Shuri, and Koyabu brings in Seiryuu to teach the club and give them advice. Setsu performs the song the club intends to play for the competition, Shinbushi, and Seiryuu joins in, demonstrating their abilities to play in harmony with each other. Despite not getting any advice, the club has a better understanding of how to match each other as Setsu managed to match Seiryuu's simplistic performance. Sometime later, the club is able to play in sync for the first time.
6	"Homeland"; Transliteration: "Genkyō" (Japanese: 原郷)	Masakazu Takahashi	Kan'ichi Katō	May 8, 2021
Hiroshi Odawara, the owner of a traditional Japanese instrument show, brings the club to Aomori for training camp over summer break. Shuri falls into a slump and with Setsu reminded about his own worries having returned to his hometown, he feels disinterested in helping her out. That night, Rai tells Setsu about how Kaito used to play soccer, but he retired after suffering a serious knee injury, and his father saw this as an opportunity to get him to study to become a lawyer like his father. The next day, Odawara brings the club out to the Tsugaru Strait and explain the history of the Tsugaru shamisen. Afterwards, Wakana drops by asking Setsu if he is entering the individual competition or not and responds with uncertainty. Wakana then explains that the most important part about playing the shamisen is the audience. Later that day, Setsu practices the shamisen by himself as he decides to enter the competition, and Shuri listens in on it inspiring her to keep on trying. On the day before returning to Tokyo, the club performs Shinbushi without any mistakes, and that night they attend the Nebuta festival.
7	"Wind"; Transliteration: "Kaze" (Japanese: 風)	Matsuo Asami	Hiroko Fukuda	May 15, 2021
The team competition for the Matsugorou Cup begins and among the participants is Mai Tanuma, who is Setsu's childhood friend, Yui's friend on social media, younger sister of the prodigy Souichi Tanuma, and daughter of the accomplished shamisen performer Kamiki Ryuugen. Mai gets upset when she finds out that Setsu is competing, but is unable to participate in the individual competition. Setsu walks out of the concert venue intending to skip the opening ceremony and meets Souichi, while at the venue Mai meets Yui in person for the first time. After the opening ceremony in which Umeko puts on a stage show, the competition begins. Setsu returns to the venue as Kai scolds him for walking out causing his teammates to worry. After some teams perform, the team from Osaka led by Kaji Takaomi performs. The Osaka team performs with perfect technique and synchronization that wows the audience.
8	"Tuning Fork"; Transliteration: "Onsa" (Japanese: 音叉)	Yasuaki Fujii	Aki Itami	May 22, 2021
As the Umezono shamisen club continues to wait, Yui tells Shuri that she intends to quit playing the shamisen after the competition. Meanwhile, the team from Fukuoka led by Ushio Arakawa performs, and despite the unorthodox nature of the performance, the crowd is wowed by the energy channeled into the performance. Shuri's nervousness reaches its peak and turns to Yui for support, while Yui tries to keep the club focused by acting tough. Mai's team then goes on stage and performs flawlessly with their modernized style, performing as if they were responding to a challenge. After trying to keep each other relaxed in the backstage area, the club goes on stage to perform.
9	"Snow Flurries"; Transliteration: "Kazabana" (Japanese: 風花)	Naoki Murata	Aki Itami	May 29, 2021
The Umezono shamisen club performs and after a rough start due to Setsu's play overwhelming the others, the club's sound becomes more harmonized as the song progresses, winning the approval of the crowd with their energetic performance. While the judges evaluate the performances, Mai, Kaji, and Ushio see Setsu and complements him on his team's performance. The results are then announced with Umezono finishing third, with Mai's team finishes second and Kaji's team wins in a tightly contested evaluation, while Umezono wins the judge's special award for showing the most potential in their performance.
10	"Wind From the Mountains"; Transliteration: "Yamaoroshi" (Japanese: 山颪)	Hiromichi Matano	Hiroko Fukuda	June 5, 2021
The individual competition for the Matsugorou Cup begins, and Ryuugen has come from Aomori to assess Setsu's abilities, adding more pressure for Setsu to perform. As Setsu prepares, he is informed that Souichi and Mai are both adopted and are not blood-related. Meanwhile, Umeko and Ryuugen have a heated conversation as Ryuugen wants Setsu to inherit the Kamiki school much to Umeko's disapproval. Ushio performs and despite poor posture and an unconventional playing style, the crowd feeds off his energy. Kaji then performs and after a strong start, a string on his shamisen snaps.
11	"Memories"; Transliteration: "Kioku" (Japanese: 記憶)	Kyoung Soon Park	Kan'ichi Katō	June 12, 2021
Despite a broken string, Kaji continues playing managing to delight the crowd with his improvisation using only two strings. Afterwards, the competition goes on a lunch break. Outside the venue, Souichi is approached by Seiryuu asking who he is interested in, and Souichi answers saying that he is interested in nobody. Elsewhere, Setsu is approached by Umeko, who explains that the purpose of the competition is for Setsu to revive Matsugorou's sound and make it known to the world. Setsu becomes conflicted between playing like his grandfather for Umeko and playing his own stil as requested by his teammates and competitors. Setsu goes on stage and starts off playing Matsugorou's style with lukewarm reception from the audience. Midway through the performance, he changes back to his usual playing style to the delight of the audience.
12	"Those Snow White Notes"; Transliteration: "Mashiro no Oto" (Japanese: ましろのおと)	Yoshiyuki Shirahata	Kan'ichi Katō	June 19, 2021
Setsu shows off his playing style after a change mid-performance, resulting in a huge ovation from the crowd. After a few more performances, Souichi goes on stage and performs his song flawlessly also generating a huge ovation. After the judges evaluate the performances, Setsu finishes in third while Souichi wins the competition. At the awards ceremony, Umeko presents Setsu with his trophy and drops it just before she hands it to him, breaking it, while telling him that she is disappointed with his decision not to play Matsugorou's style. As criticism continues to pile on from Ryuugen and Seiryuu, Setsu leaves the competition feeling dejected. Setsu goes on to skip the next several days of school afterwards as he reflects and debates on the playing style he wants to pursue.

== Reception ==
=== Manga ===
Those Snow White Notes was nominated for the 4th Manga Taishō, and it was ranked third in the 2012 Kono Manga ga Sugoi! Top 20 Manga for Male Readers survey. It also won the 36th Kodansha Manga Award in the shōnen category and an Excellence Award at the 16th Japan Media Arts Festival Awards. The series was nominated for the 23rd Tezuka Osamu Cultural Prize in 2019. Volume 9 has sold 70,223 copies as of October 20, 2013.

Rebecca Silverman of Anime News Network reviewed the manga's first volume in 2021, giving high praise to the opening "Track 0" chapter for its introduction of Yuna, criticized the story going downhill once she leaves for less interesting characters but felt there was potential going forward in subsequent volumes, concluding that: "There's definitely more for this series than against it at this point, and I'm looking forward to continuing to be proven wrong in my earlier assumptions about Marimo Ragawa as a creator."

=== Anime ===
Fellow ANN editor Nicholas Dupree placed Those Snow White Notes at number three on his top 5 best anime list of 2021, saying despite being "woefully incomplete", he praised the "heart-wrenching and deeply human journey" of its main character and the "excellently animated instrumentation" throughout the musical numbers, concluding that: "It desperately needs an encore, but only because a really good concert leaves you wanting more."
