= Forecasting Love and Weather =

2022 South Korean television series

- Promotional poster
- Hangul: 기상청 사람들: 사내연애 잔혹사 편
- Hanja: 氣象廳 사람들: 社內戀愛 殘酷史 篇
- Lit.: Meteorological Agency People: The Cruelty of In-House Romance
- RR: Gisangcheong saramdeul: sanaeyeonae janhoksa pyeon
- MR: Kisangch'ŏng saramdŭl: sanaeyŏnae chanhoksa p'yŏn
- Genre: Romance
- Created by: Plot Line; Kang Eun-kyung
- Written by: Seon Young
- Directed by: Cha Young-hoon
- Starring: Park Min-young; Song Kang; Yoon Park; Yura
- Music by: Gaemi (Manager Music)
- Country of origin: South Korea
- Original language: Korean
- No. of episodes: 16

Production
- Executive producers: Kim Do-kyun; Hwang Ra-kyung; Kang Ra-young
- Producers: Pyo Jong-rok; Kim Hyeong-cheol; Han Jeong-hoon; Jeong Ji-han
- Cinematography: Jang Byung-wook; Joo Myung-soo
- Editors: Shin Seung-ah; Lee Ga-young
- Running time: 70 minutes
- Production companies: Npio Entertainment; JTBC Studios

Original release
- Network: JTBC
- Release: February 12 – April 3, 2022

Forecasting Love and Weather (Korean: 기상청 사람들: 사내연애 잔혹사 편) is a 2022 South Korean drama directed by Cha Young-hoon and starring Park Min-young, Song Kang, Yoon Park and Yura. It depicts a cheerful love story of staff at the Korea Meteorological Administration who break, fall, and rise again and their daily life at work. The drama premiered on JTBC on February 12, 2022, and aired every weekend at 22:30 (KST) for 16 episodes. It is available for streaming on Netflix.

Forecasting Love and Weather featured in Global Top 10 weekly list of the most-watched international Netflix TV shows for 6 weeks in a row from February 21 to April 3.

== Synopsis ==
The drama depicts a romance between the diligent forecaster, Jin Ha-kyung, and her free-spirited co-worker, Lee Si-woo, in a national weather service.

== Cast and characters ==
=== Main ===
- Park Min-young as Jin Ha-kyung
  - Park Seo-kyung as young Jin Ha-kyung

The 35-year-old general forecaster of the 2nd Division of Korea Meteorological Administration (KMA). Han Ki-joon's ex-fiance, she is in love with Lee Si-woo.

- Song Kang as Lee Si-woo
  - Song Min-jae as young Lee Shi-woo

A 27-year-old man who is in charge of Special Reporting Division 2 of KMA. Chae Yoo-jin's ex-boyfriend, he is in love with Jin Ha-kyung.

- Yoon Park as Han Ki-joon, Jin Ha-kyung's ex fiance,

The 36-year-old informant of KMA's spokesperson's office who is married to Chae Yoo-jin.

- Yura as Chae Yoo-jin

A 25-year-old weather reporter for a daily newspaper. Lee Si-woo's ex-girlfriend, she is married Han Ki-joon.

=== Supporting ===
==== People at Meteorological Office ====
- Lee Sung-wook as Eom Dong-han

A 44-year-old senior forecaster at General 2 department.

- Moon Tae-yoo as Shin Seok-ho

General 2 department and neighborhood forecaster in early 40s.

- Yoon Sa-bong as Oh Myung-joo

Head of Analysis Team 2 of the Korean Meteorological Department in mid-40s. She is the mother of two sons with the highest levels of parenting issues.

- Chae Seo-eun as Kim Soo-jin

In late 20s, a short-term forecaster became a civil servant with excellent grades.

- Kwon Hae-hyo as Ko Bong-chan

The head of the Forecast Bureau in the Seoul Main Office in late 50s.

- Bae Myung-jin as Park Joo-moo

A policy officer who helps Go Bong-chan.

- Lee Tae-gum as local weather forecaster which is a member of the Korea Meteorological Agency.

==== People around Jin Ha-kyung ====
- Kim Mi-kyung as Bae Soo-ja

In late 60s, Jin Ha-kyung's mother

- Jung Woon-sun as Jin Tae-kyung

In early 40s, Jin Ha-kyung's older sister, a fairy tale writer.

==== People outside the Meteorological Office ====
- Jang So-yeon as Lee Hyang-rae

Eom Dong-han's wife in early 50s.

- Lee Seung-joo as Eom Bomi

Eom Dong-han's daughter in mid-teens.

- Jeon Bae-soo as Lee Myung-han, Lee Shi-woo's father

=== Special appearance ===
- Seo Jeong-yeon as Seong Mi-jin

Manager of Jeju Typhoon Center.

- Yoon Bok-in as Chae Yoo-jin's mother
- Seo Hyun-chul as Chae Yoo-jin's step father

== Episodes ==
No.	Title	Original release date
1	"Signal"	February 12, 2022
KMA meteorologist Jin Ha-kyung struggles with the hardships of her work as the agency fails to forecast a hailstorm that struck the capital area, amidst the pressure of her upcoming marriage with co-employee Han Ki-joon. Junior meteorologist Lee Shi-woo, who was one of the very few staff who saw earlier the possibility for hail, tries to convince the headquarters of a potential late afternoon rainshower. Ha-kyung discovers Ki-joon sleeping with weather journalist Chae Yoo-jin, who later breaks up with her boyfriend Shi-woo.
2	"Sensible Temperature"	February 13, 2022
Two months later, Ha-kyung is promoted upon the resignation of her predecessor, and Shi-woo is transferred to the KMA headquarters for his excellent forecasting skills; Ki-joon and Yoo-jin are married. Ha-kyung, Shi-woo and other KMA meteorologists try to pinpoint the cause of the near-freezing temperatures in the Korean peninsula amid the spring season. Ha-kyung and Ki-joon clash at work over who inherits their apartment. Later, Ha-kyung and Shi-woo have a drink and talk about the two people who messed up with both of their love lives.
3	"In Between Seasons"	February 19, 2022
After having a drunken one-night stand, Ha-kyung and Shi-woo agree to pretend nothing at all happened between them. The KMA is pressured by fisherfolks to lift the Wind Wave Warning (풍랑경보 pungnanggyeongbo) that has been in effect for two days. Ha-kyung insists extending the Warning until there is enough evidence for it to be downgraded to Wind Wave Advisory (풍랑주의보 pungnangju-uibo) or be lifted entirely. Later, Ha-kyung starts having feelings for Shi-woo, who admits that he would not ask her out if she has no feelings for him.
4	"Visibility"	February 20, 2022
Ha-kyung seemingly refuses to be involved in a new workplace romance despite she and Shi-woo admitting their feelings for each other. After a massive pile-up due to radiation fog over the peninsula, Ha-kyung and Shi-woo get tangled in an awkward argument on how to issue their fog advisories. Yoo-jin writes a news article about the lack of an official fog advisory in KMA's system of weather advisories (기상특보 gisangteukbo), which she discussed without providing proper context and puts the KMA in a bad light. Ha-kyung and Shi-woo team up in crafting a feature refuting Yoo-jin's biased article.
5	"Localized Heavy Rain"	February 26, 2022
Ki-jun finds it difficult to let go of Yu-jin's lie. Unrest grows within Ha-kyung's team, and Um Dong-han struggles to focus at work.
6	"Heat Island Phenomenon"	February 27, 2022
Ha-kyung grows wary of Si-woo's secrets after running into him at a motel. News about her mother sends her hurrying to the hospital.
7	"Ozone Warning"	March 5, 2022
After an uneasy convorsation with Yu-jin, Ki-jun seeks sage advice. While looking for a place to crash, Si-woo finds someone else in need of a home.
8	"Discomfort Index"	March 6, 2022
As temperatures boil over outside, so do emotions as another uncovered truth pushes the animosity between Si-woo and Ki-jun to new heights.
9	"Dry Changma (Rainy Season)"	March 12, 2022
Ha-kyung narrates about the uncertainty of the weather forecasting, especially when it comes to the rainy season arriving. She does not want to take anything for granted. Bothered to no end by the sight of Ha-kyung and Si-woo together, Ki-jun tails them on their day-off. Meanwhile, Yu-jin wonders where he is. When Ki-jun finally makes it home, Yu-jin is annoyed because he missed his mother's birthday. The next day in office, there is still uncertainty regarding the rain at the weather station, so they need to report on the delay. Si-woo does not think they should make a hasty announcement, but Ki-jun challenges him. The chief director asks both men to debate their theories so they can publish an appropriate statement. Yu-jin interviews Ha-kyung one-on-one about the weather miscalculation, but brings up the rumors that she is dating Si-woo afterwards. She admits he is innocent, charming, smart, and good looking. Ha-kyung asks Yu-jin why she broke up with him if he is a good person. Yu-jin tells Ha-kyung that Si-woo does not believe in marriage. Meanwhile, Ki-jun tells Si-woo that Ha-kyung does not date anyone who does not consider marriage.
10	"Tropical Night"	March 13, 2022
Ha-kyung faces intensifying pressure from her mother to get married. A pesky reporter lurks around the office in search of a good story. Eum notices that his daughter is on a field-trip to the KMA and excitedly catches up with her but Eom Dong-han's wife she is not impressed about Bo-mi going to the KMA. She wants him to tell their daughter not to go and to call off the whole event. When information about a heat spike has been mistakenly uploaded onto the online portal. Myung-joo is in charge of this and she profusely apologizes as they hurriedly work to take it down but Butcher Heo notices it flash up on the portal and inevitably starts writing up a story of his own. The next morning, the Director General is unhappy with news of the incorrect heat spike has become a public interest, as Yu-jin talks with Heo-in the cafeteria is terrible. packs up her things and decides she and Ki-Jun should take some time apart.
11	"1°C"	March 19, 2022
Ha-kyung sends Si-woo on an assignment to the Jeju island Typhoon Center. Si-woo clearly shows displeasures but then agrees with a smile. Meanwhile, Ki-jun tells Yu-jin not to leave for a "break" or it will be over between them. She sticks to her decision and leaves the apartment. Um Dong-han is happy to see his daughter Bo-mi at work while Um Dong-han's wife looks at a petition for a divorce. Later on, Bo-mi has an allergic reaction and collapses in the bathroom. She ends up at the hospital, and the wife berates Um Dong-han for giving their daughter processed meat at the cafeteria. Si-woo meets Ha-kyung, and she tells him they should try and make it work. However, the next day, Ha-kyung is devastated when she learns that Si-woo has left for Jeju island. Ha-kyung blames Ki-jun for these and believes if it was not for the wounds he created, she would not have sent Si-woo away.
12	"Variation Area"	March 20, 2022
13	"Scenario 1, 2, 3"	March 26, 2022
14	"Anticyclone"	March 27, 2022
15	"Ensemble"	April 2, 2022
16	"Tomorrow's Answers"	April 3, 2022

== Production ==
In March 2021, it was reported that Cha Young-hoon directed the series created by Gline's creative group, led by writer Kang Eun-kyung. During the same time, Park Min-young and Song Kang were considering appearing in the series as main lead actors. In May 2021, Yura and Yoon Park joined the cast of the series.

Kim Mi-kyung and Park Min-young are playing mother and daughter on-screen for the fourth time. Before this series, they appeared as mother and daughter in Running, Sungkyunkwan Scandal, and Her Private Life. They also appeared together in 2014 KBS TV series Healer.

On October 19, 2021, Park Min-young posted photos from the filming site.

On March 5, 2022, it was confirmed that actor Yoon Park had tested positive for COVID-19 as a precautionary measure. He had a self-diagnosis kit on March 4 and after being tested positive. He was given the PCR test immediately as the filming for the drama had ended. The broadcast schedule seems to be uninterrupted.

== Original soundtrack ==
=== Part 1 ===
Released on February 20, 2022
No.	Title	Lyrics	Music	Artist	Length
1.	"Melting" (사르르쿵)	Cheeze	Cheeze; Midnight	Cheeze	3:06
2.	"Melting" (사르르쿵; Inst.)		Cheeze; Midnight		3:06
Total length:					6:12

=== Part 2 ===
Released on February 27, 2022
No.	Title	Lyrics	Music	Artist	Length
1.	"Mind Warning" (마음주의보)	Gaemi; Yoda	Kim Se-jin	Onew	3:49
2.	"Mind Warning" (마음주의보; Inst.)		Kim Se-jin		3:49
Total length:					7:39

=== Part 3 ===
Released on March 6, 2022
No.	Title	Lyrics	Music	Artist	Length
1.	"Promise You"	Gaemi; Midnight	Gaemi	Kyuhyun	4:11
2.	"Promise You" (Inst.)		Gaemi		4:11
Total length:					8:22

=== Part 4 ===
Released on March 12, 2022
No.	Title	Lyrics	Music	Artist	Length
1.	"Something Precious" (사소중한 게 생겼나 봐)	Yang Jae-sun	Abe Song; Glody; Raid	Rothy	3:29
2.	"Something Precious" (사소중한 게 생겼나 봐; Inst.)		Abe Song; Glody; Raid		3:29
Total length:					6:58

=== Part 5 ===
Released on March 13, 2022
No.	Title	Lyrics	Music	Artist	Length
1.	"The Day You were Falling" (니가 내리는 날에)	Gaemi; Midnight	Gaemi	John Park	4:24
2.	"The Day You were Falling" (니가 내리는 날에; Inst.)		Gaemi		4:24
Total length:					8:48

=== Part 6 ===
Released on March 19, 2022
No.	Title	Lyrics	Music	Artist	Length
1.	"I Love You This Much" (이만큼 난 너를 사랑해)	Gadle; Gat	Gat	Punch	3:42
2.	"I Love You This Much" (이만큼 난 너를 사랑해; Inst.)		Gat		3:42
Total length:					7:24

=== Part 7 ===
Released on March 20, 2022
No.	Title	Lyrics	Music	Artist	Length
1.	"Even If It Hurts A Little More" (조금 더 아파도)	Gadle; Gat	Gat, Midnight	Kim Na-young	3:56
2.	"Even If It Hurts A Little More" (Inst.)		Gat, Midnight		3:56
Total length:					7:52

=== Part 8 ===
Released on March 27, 2022
No.	Title	Lyrics	Music	Artist	Length
1.	"Abnormal Climate" (이상기후)	Giriboy	Giriboy; Basecamp	Giriboy	4:06
2.	"Abnormal Climate" (이상기후; Inst.)		Giriboy; Basecamp		4:06
Total length:					8:12

=== Part 9 ===
Released on April 2, 2022
No.	Title	Lyrics	Music	Artist	Length
1.	"Open Your Heart"	Heo Seong-jin	Heo Seong-jin; Maria Marcus; Louise Frick Sveen	Lyn	3:45
2.	"Open Your Heart" (Inst.)		Heo Seong-jin; Maria Marcus; Louise Frick Sveen		3:45
Total length:					7:30

== Viewership ==
Forecasting Love and Weather : South Korea viewers per episode (millions)

Season	Episode number																Average
Season	1	2	3	4	5	6	7	8	9	10	11	12	13	14	15	16	Average
1	1.103	1.306	1.692	1.812	1.406	1.615	1.677	1.785	1.503	1.844	1.747	1.799	1.718	1.634	1.315	1.627	1.599

Source: Audience measurement performed nationwide by Nielsen Korea

Ep.	Original broadcast date	Average audience share (Nielsen Korea)	
Ep.	Original broadcast date	Nationwide	Seoul
1	February 12, 2022	4.514% (3rd)	5.557% (2nd)
2	February 13, 2022	5.455% (1st)	5.998% (1st)
3	February 19, 2022	6.787% (1st)	7.342% (1st)
4	February 20, 2022	7.849% (1st)	9.046% (1st)
5	February 26, 2022	6.103% (2nd)	7.333% (1st)
6	February 27, 2022	7.007% (1st)	8.120% (1st)
7	March 5, 2022	6.448% (2nd)	7.401% (1st)
8	March 6, 2022	7.514% (1st)	8.723% (1st)
9	March 12, 2022	6.421% (2nd)	7.236% (2nd)
10	March 13, 2022	7.555% (2nd)	8.805% (1st)
11	March 19, 2022	7.232% (2nd)	8.473% (2nd)
12	March 20, 2022	7.618% (2nd)	8.521% (1st)
13	March 26, 2022	7.068% (2nd)	8.203% (2nd)
14	March 27, 2022	6.828% (1st)	7.578% (1st)
15	April 2, 2022	5.650% (2nd)	6.113% (2nd)
16	April 3, 2022	7.344% (1st)	8.316% (1st)
Average		6.712%	7.673%
In the table above, the blue numbers represent the lowest ratings and the red numbers represent the highest ratings.; This series aired on a cable channel/pay TV which normally has a relatively smaller audience compared to free-to-air TV/public broadcasters (KBS, SBS, MBC, and EBS).
