= New York New York (manga) =

Japanese manga series by Marimo Ragawa

- Cover of the first tankōbon edition

ニューヨーク・ニューヨーク (Nyū Yōku Nyū Yōku)
- Genre: Drama, yaoi
- Created by: Marimo Ragawa
- Manga
- Written by: Marimo Ragawa
- Published by: Hakusensha
- English publisher: NA: Yen Press
- Imprint: Jets Comics
- Magazine: Hana to Yume
- Original run: 1995 – 1998
- Volumes: 4
- Audio drama
- Studio: Marine Entertainment
- Released: May 24, 2000
- Episodes: 2

New York New York (Japanese: ニューヨーク・ニューヨーク, Hepburn: Nyū Yōku Nyū Yōku) is a Japanese shōjo manga series written and illustrated by Marimo Ragawa. Originally serialized in the manga magazine Hana to Yume from 1995 to 1998 and adapted into an audio drama in 2000, New York New York is focused on the relationship between a police officer and a civilian.

== Synopsis ==
Cain Walker, a police officer in New York City, is gay but remains closeted. He engages in a series of one night stands in the city's gay bars until he meets Mel Fredericks, with whom he decides to pursue a relationship. The series follows their often tumultuous relationship as they confront a variety of challenges, including sexual assault, marriage, parenting, and HIV/AIDS.

== Characters ==
Cain Walker (ケイン・ウォーカー)
Voiced by: Kazuya Nakai
A 25-year-old police officer at the New York City Police Department (NYPD). Born in Newton, Massachusetts, he moved to Queens in order to work as a police officer. He is gay, but closeted.
Mel Fredericks (メル・フレデリクス)
Voiced by: Hideo Ishikawa
A 22-year-old barista born and raised in Upper Manhattan. He was raised by his aunt after his mother committed suicide, but left the home after being sexually abused by his uncle while in high school.
Daniel Howard (ダニエル・ハワード)
Voiced by: Kenji Nojima
A former colleague of Cain's who became involved in smuggling heroin.
Brian Berg (ブライアン・バーグ)
Voiced by: Tomomichi Nishimura
The chief of the NYPD, and Cain's boss.

== Media ==
=== Manga ===
The series, which was developed by author Marimo Ragawa after a visit to New York City, was serialized in the manga magazine Hana to Yume from 1995 to 1998. It was subsequently collected by Hakusensha as four tankōbon volumes in 1998, and later re-published as two bunkoban volumes in 2003, featuring essays by manga scholar Yukari Fujimoto and author Satoru Ito. An English-language translation of the series published by Yen Press was originally slated for release in October 2021. However, it was delayed until March 2022.

No.	Original release date	Original ISBN	English release date	English ISBN
1	March 1998	4-592-13178-9	March 8, 2022	978-1-9753-2535-0
2	May 1998	4-592-13342-0	March 8, 2022	978-1-9753-2535-0
3	August 1998	4-592-13343-9	July 19, 2022	978-1-9753-3814-5
4	November 1998	4-592-13344-7	July 19, 2022	978-1-9753-3814-5

=== Audio drama ===
An audio drama adaptation of New York New York was produced by Marine Entertainment (a subsidiary of Animate) and released on two compact discs on May 24, 2000.

== Reception and analysis ==
In Manga: Sixty Years of Japanese Comics, writer Paul Gravett describes New York New York as a "moving, 700-page melodrama," praising its thriller elements and its realistic depiction of gay identity. Mark McLelland of the University of Wollongong similarly notes that in contrast to "pre-political" yaoi of the 1990s that typically focused on romance to the exclusion of sexual identity, New York New York is notable as among the first yaoi manga to depict social realism in its treatment of gay identity through its portrayal of homophobia, coming out, gay bashing, sexual abuse, and rape. He commends the series for its attempt "to refer to the very real social problems in which same-sex desire is grounded," but writes that the sentimental and melodramatic nature of the story "works against a realistic interpretation of the narrative." In a separate review, McLelland qualifies his assessment of New York New York by noting that as yaoi is "not written by or for gay men," it "should not be criticised for failing to represent their concerns accurately."

McLelland further notes Cain and Mel as an archetypal example of seme and uke dynamics in yaoi. Mel assumes the role traditionally occupied by women in heterosexual romance fiction: he is physically weak, subordinated, emotional, and repeatedly the victim of crimes from which he is saved by his lover. McLelland argues that Mel consequently exists to serve as a figure of identification for the yaoi genre's largely female readership.

== See also ==
- Fake (manga)
