= Back to Earth (Lisa Ekdahl album) =

Studio album by Lisa Ekdahl
- Released: 1998 (Sweden), 1999 (USA)
- Genre: Jazz
- Label: RCA Records
- Producer: Patrik Boman, Peter Nordahl

Back to Earth is an album by Swedish singer Lisa Ekdahl, recorded with the Peter Nordahl Trio, and released in the United States by RCA Records in 1999. A special edition was also released in 1999 that had two bonus tracks.

== Track listing ==
1. "Stranger on Earth" (Sid Feller, Rick Ward)
2. "Nature Boy" (Eden Ahbez)
3. "Now or Never" (Curtis Reginald Lewis, Billie Holiday)
4. "Laziest Girl in Town" (Cole Porter)
5. "It Had to Be You" (Gus Kahn, Isham Jones)
6. "Down with Love" (Harold Arlen, Edgar Yipsel Harburg)
7. "What is This Thing Called Love?" (Cole Porter)
8. "Tea for Two" (Vincent Youmans, Lyrics: Irving Caesar)
9. "The Lonely One" (Lenny Hambro, Roberta Heller)
10. "I Get a Kick Out of You" (Cole Porter)
11. "Just For a Thrill" (Lillian Hardin Armstrong, Don Raye)
12. "Night & Day" (Cole Porter)
13. "Plaintive Rumba" (Peter Nordahl)
14. "After You Get What You Want"* (Irving Berlin)
15. "If I Were A Bell"* (Frank Loesser)

* denotes bonus track on special edition
