= Lisa Ekdahl =

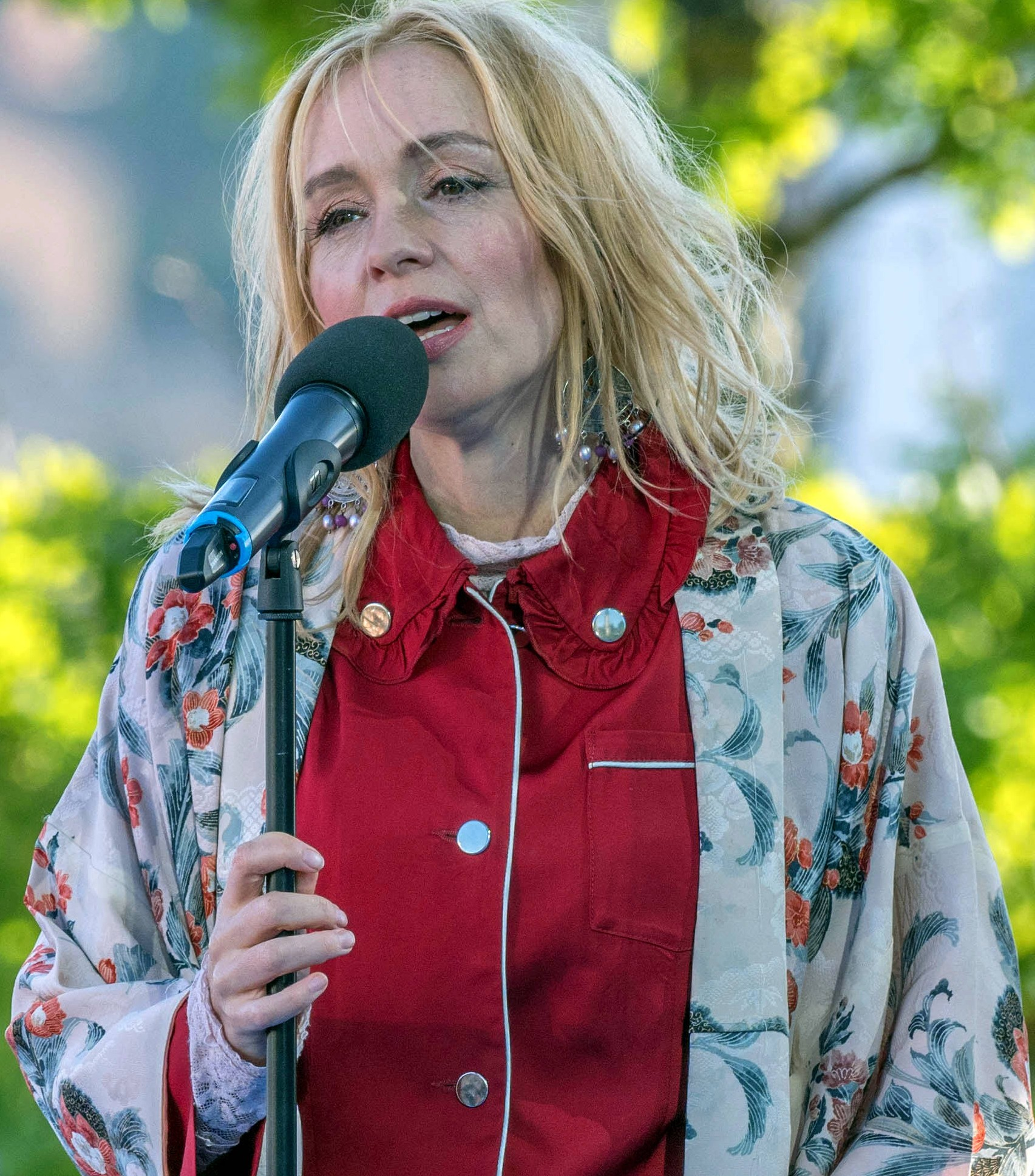

Background information
- Born: 29 July 1971 (age 55)
- Origin: Stockholm, Sweden
- Genres: Jazz, vispop
- Occupation: Singer-songwriter
- Website: www.lisaekdahl.com

Lisa Ekdahl (born 29 July 1971) is a Swedish popular music singer and songwriter. She has so far released 10 albums, most of them in Swedish, but some entirely in English. Her voice has been described as "child-like" and "soft, supple and smooth".

== Career ==
In 1994, at the age of 22, Ekdahl became famous overnight in Sweden with her self-titled debut album and the No. 1 hit single "Vem vet" ("Who Knows?"). The record sold almost 800,000 copies and she was awarded three Swedish music prizes, one of them as the nation's best artist of the year. She also enjoyed success in Denmark and Norway.

She signed with EMI Records, but later recorded two pop albums with RCA/BMG: Med kroppen mot jorden and Bortom det blå in 1996 and 1997. In 1998, she recorded the English language album When Did You Leave Heaven, which contained jazz standards. Ekdahl has been focusing on, with great success, Scandinavia and Europe (most noticeably France), leaving little mark in other countries such as the United States. Her following album, Back to Earth (1999), was again full of jazz standards and, like her jazz debut, recorded with the Peter Nordahl Trio. In France alone, it sold over 40,000 copies. She received positive reviews for her live appearances in Great Britain from The Daily Telegraph and The Guardian.

Ekdahl's sixth album, Lisa Ekdahl sings Salvadore Poe (2000), signaled a new direction and critical esteem. As the new album's title indicates, Ekdahl exclusively sings songs written by her husband, also known as Paul DiBartolo, guitarist in New York glam metal band Spread Eagle, primarily in the bossa nova style. Her fragile and childish voice seems to be made for this type of music. Their album was a great success in France and Scandinavia, where it sold over 120,000 copies by early 2001.

Her voice is variously compared to Blossom Dearie, Diana Krall, and perhaps most accurately, Astrud Gilberto. Her hit song "Vem Vet" is also in the soundtrack of the Korean drama Love Rain.

In 2016 she participated in the music show Så mycket bättre broadcast on TV4.

== Personal life ==
She was born in Hägersten, Sweden to her parents who were a nuclear physicist and kindergarten teacher. She was raised just outside Mariefred, Sweden. She has two sisters and attended school at the Tälje Musikgymnasium. Her music is published by her company Lisa Ekdahl AB.

Ekdahl has lived in New York City. In 1999, she met American composer and guitarist Salvadore Poe, former guitarist of 1990s New York sleaze rockers Spread Eagle on a flight to India. They married in 2000, and they later collaborated on an album together. They are now divorced. She was previously married to Swedish singer Bill Öhrström, with whom she has a son Milton (born 23 December 1994). She also has a daughter born in 2012.

She currently lives in the Södermalm district of Stockholm.

== Awards ==
- Rockbjörn-- "Best Female Artist" 1994
- Swedish Grammys—1994

Artist of the year, Female Pop
Rock artist of the Year
Album of the Year

- The Ulla Billquist scholarship

== Discography ==
=== Singles ===
Title	Year	Peak chart positions	Album
Title	Year	SWE	Album
"Vem vet"	1994	4	Lisa Ekdahl

=== Solo albums ===
- 1994: Lisa Ekdahl
- 1996: Med kroppen mot jorden
- 1997: Bortom det blå
- 2000: Sings Salvadore Poe
- 2004: Olyckssyster
- 2006: Pärlor av glas
- 2009: Give Me That Slow Knowing Smile
- 2014: Look to Your Own Heart
- 2016: Tolkningarna – Så mycket bättre Säsong 7
- 2017: När alla vägar leder hem
- 2018: More of the Good

=== Live albums ===
- 2011: At the Olympia Paris

=== Compilations ===
- 2002: Heaven Earth & Beyond
- 2003: En samling sånger

=== Collaborations ===
- 1995: When Did You Leave Heaven (with the Peter Nordahl trio)
- 1998: Back to Earth (with the Peter Nordahl trio)
- 2000: Duet with Henri Salvador in the song "All I Really Want Is Love" on his album Chambre Avec Vue
- 2001: Kiss & Hug: From a Happy Boy (duet with Danish singer Lars H.U.G. in the song "Backwards")
- 2003: Duet with Rod Stewart in the song "Where or When" on his album As Time Goes By: The Great American Songbook 2

== See also ==
- List of Swedes in music
