= When Did You Leave Heaven =

Studio album by Lisa Ekdahl
- Released: 1995
- Label: RCA records

When Did You Leave Heaven is a studio album by Swedish singer Lisa Ekdahl. It was released in 1995 by BMG and by RCA records, and a special edition was released through Phantom Records.

== Track listings ==
=== RCA ===
1. "When Did You Leave Heaven"
2. "But Not For Me"
3. "Cry Me A River"
4. "Love For Sale"
5. "Lush Life"
6. "You're Going to See a Lot of Me"
7. "It was Just One of Those Things"
8. "Boy Next Door"
9. "I'm a Fool to Want You"
10. "My Heart Belongs to Daddy"
11. "Blame it on My Youth"

=== Phantom ===
1. "When Did You Leave Heaven"
2. "But Not for Me"
3. "Cry Me a River"
4. "Love for Sale"
5. "Lush Life"
6. "You're Gonna See a Lot of Me"
7. "It's Oh So Quiet"*
8. "It Was Just One of Those Things"
9. "The Boy Next Door"
10. "I'm a Fool to Want You"
11. "My Heart Belongs to Daddy"
12. "Blame It on My Youth"
13. "It's Oh So Quiet"*

* denotes track not on standard edition

== Charts ==
Chart (1997–2002)	Peak position
French Albums (SNEP)	96
Norwegian Albums (VG-lista)	35
Swedish Albums (Sverigetopplistan)	25
