= Itaewon murder case =

1997 murder in Seoul, South Korea

Arthur Patterson
- Born: 1979 (age 46–47); Los Angeles, California, US
- Status: 20 years imprisonment
- Conviction: Murder

Details
- Date apprehended: September 23, 2015

The Itaewon murder took place on April 3, 1997, when 17-year-old Arthur Patterson killed 22-year-old Cho Jung-pil (Korean: 조중필; born 1974), a Hongik University student, by stabbing him at a Burger King in Itaewon, Seoul, South Korea. Patterson and his friend Edward Lee were arrested, but they were released by the Supreme Court of South Korea in 1998 due to lack of evidence, and Patterson fled to the United States. Lee was initially convicted of the murder but was later acquitted.

In October 2012, the case was reopened, and in 2015, Patterson was extradited back to South Korea. A year later, he was found guilty of the murder and sentenced to 20 years in prison.

== Murder of Cho Jung-Pil ==
Edward Lee, a Korean-American, and Arthur Patterson, the son of a US soldier stationed in South Korea, together with 20 other teenagers, were at a Burger King in Itaewon in Seoul on April 3, 1997. After the rest of the group left, Patterson and Lee went to the bathroom, where they came in contact with Cho Jung-Pil and stabbed him nine times in the neck and chest with a knife. On April 4, the United States Army Criminal Investigation Division received an anonymous report and arrested Patterson. On April 6, after seeing his son on television, Edward Lee's father confronted him, but Lee denied involvement in the crime. They later met with a lawyer, and Lee confessed to the crime on April 8.

== Convictions, acquittal, and flight ==
Following what was later said to have been a botched investigation on the part of South Korean detectives, Lee was convicted of murder, while Patterson was convicted of possession of a weapon. Lee was later acquitted by the Supreme Court of South Korea due to insufficient evidence against him, and Patterson, who had not received a travel ban, fled to the United States in 1999.

The Cho family sued the South Korean government for negligence and for preventing Patterson from leaving the country. The Supreme Court ruled in their favor.

== Reopening of the case ==
In 2009, following the release of Hong Ki-sun's feature film The Case of Itaewon Homicide, the incident attracted renewed attention, and South Korean prosecutors reopened the case, filing an extradition request with the US government for Patterson's return to South Korea, and indicting him for murder. In October 2011, it was announced that Patterson had been arrested in Los Angeles and would be sent back to South Korea, to prevent the expiration of the relevant statute of limitations, in April 2012. According to MBC News, an acquaintance of Patterson's had stated in an interview that he heard Patterson say "I killed Mr. Cho". It was also reported that Lee had written a letter of apology to Cho's mother, in which he promised to tell the truth in court if Patterson was brought to trial.

The U.S. District Attorney Andrew Brown of the Central District of California, who presided over the extradition case, asserted that he believed Patterson and Lee had been accomplices and that evidence pointed to Patterson's being the culprit in the murder. As the investigation continued, South Korean prosecutors claimed to have uncovered evidence to suggest that Lee had handed Patterson the knife and instructed him to stab Cho.

In October 2012, the U.S. District Court ruled for Patterson to be extradited to South Korea, though his lawyers subsequently submitted a petition of habeas corpus, delaying the extradition.

== Final sentencing ==
In September 2015, 18 years after the murder, Patterson was extradited to Seoul to stand trial once more. He was held at the Seoul Detention Center.

He continued to claim his innocence throughout the trial and maintained that Lee was the killer. In January 2016, Patterson was found guilty and sentenced to 20 years in prison, with the judge explaining that "the court decided on a life sentence, but in view of the defendant's age, of being under 18 at the time, the sentence will be 20 years in prison". Patterson appealed, but the court upheld the sentence.

== In media ==
- March 6, 1999 – the SBS investigative program I Want to Know broadcast an episode about the murder.
- January 27, 2003 – the MBC program Real Story Theater: Crime and Punishment aired an episode about the case.
- September 2009 – the feature film The Case of Itaewon Homicide is based on the case.
- December 19, 2009 – I Want to Know broadcast another episode about the murder.
