= The Case of Itaewon Homicide =

- Film poster
- Hangul: 이태원 살인사건
- Hanja: 梨泰院 殺人事件
- RR: Itaewon sarin sageon
- MR: It'aewŏn sarin sakŏn
- Directed by: Hong Ki-sun
- Written by: Lee Maeyu-gu
- Produced by: David Cho; Lee Jeong-hee; Jeong Seong-hun; Sin Beom-su
- Starring: Jang Keun-suk; Jung Jin-young
- Cinematography: Oh Cheng-ok
- Edited by: Kang Sung-hoon
- Music by: Park Ji-woong
- Production company: Sponge Entertainment
- Distributed by: Showbox
- Release date: September 10, 2009
- Running time: 100 minutes
- Country: South Korea
- Language: Korean
- Box office: $3.3 million

The Case of Itaewon Homicide (Korean: 이태원 살인사건) is a 2009 South Korean crime thriller film, based on the true story of the Itaewon murder case, which shocked Korea when Hongik college student Cho Jung-Pil was found dead at an Itaewon Burger King in 1997. The murder was investigated in 1997 by CID Agents J. Choi, D. Zeliff, T. Barnes and B. Crow. Two troubled U.S. teenagers—Arthur Patterson (the son of a former U.S. Army officer and Korean mother) and Edward Lee—became suspects and were convicted. Patterson was released a year later in a special amnesty and Lee was freed a year after that due to lack of evidence. The case never resulted in further convictions. It stars Jang Keun-suk as Arthur Patterson and Jung Jin-young as his lawyer. Song Joong-ki played the victim. The film had 531,068 admissions in South Korea nationwide.

== Cast ==
- Jung Jin-young as Prosecutor Park
- Jang Keun-suk as Robert J. Pearson (Arthur Patterson)
- Shin Seung-hwan as Alex "AJ" Jung (Edward Lee)
- Oh Kwang-rok as Attorney Kim Byeon
- Ko Chang-seok as Alex's father
- Song Joong-ki as Cho Jung-Pil (murder victim)
- Josh Carrott as David
- Park Soo-young as Chief Choi
- Kim Jung-ki as Judge
- Jung Woon-sun as Jung-Pil's elder sister
- Choi Il-hwa as Jung-Pil's father
- Kim Min-kyung as Jung-Pil's mother
- Song Young-chang
- Jo Seung-eun
- Park Jin-young as Attorney Jang
- Jin Kyung as Prosecutor Park's wife

== Extradition of Arthur Patterson ==
With renewed public attention after the movie release, public prosecutors in South Korea reopened the case after discovering DNA evidence purported to show Patterson as the murderer. Edward Lee had previously testified to Patterson being the murderer during the first trial. Patterson was re-arrested by U.S. authorities in May 2011 and went before a court hearing in California concerning extradition to Korea for a new trial. Arthur Patterson's extradition to South Korea was approved and culminated with his arrival at Incheon International Airport, Sep. 2015.

Murder Trial and Conviction

During the four-month trial, Patterson repeatedly claimed that he was innocent and accused Lee of having killed Cho. Lee testified as a witness saying that he clearly saw Patterson turn to Cho to stab him. In January 2016, the prosecution sought a 20-year prison term for Patterson, which under Korean law is the maximum sentence able to be handed down to suspects aged 18 or less at the time of their crime. On January 28, 2016, Patterson was found guilty of the stabbing of the victim, Cho Jung-Pil, and was sentenced to 20 years behind bars. Patterson and his lawyers have said they plan to appeal the verdict.

Appeals

On Monday, February 1, 2016, local officials in Seoul, South Korea, informed the public that Arthur Patterson lodged an appeal with a higher court. Patterson is still adamantly denying the charges and continues to blame Lee for the stabbing death of Cho Joong-Pil. The appeal will deal with issues such as evidence accepted by the court and its legitimacy, and possible mistakes in the application of law.
