= Marimo Ragawa =

Japanese manga artist

Marimo Ragawa 羅川 真里茂
- Born: September 21 Hachinohe, Aomori, Japan
- Area: Manga artist
- Notable works: Baby & Me; New York New York
- Awards: Shogakukan Manga Award (1995), Kodansha Manga Award (2012), Japan Media Arts Festival Excellence Award (2012)

Marimo Ragawa (Japanese: 羅川 真里茂, Hepburn: Ragawa Marimo; born September 21 in Hachinohe, Aomori) is a Japanese manga artist. She began submitting manga to comic magazines when she was only 12 years old, in the sixth grade of elementary school. She continued to send her manga to the same magazine for four years, but failed to receive a positive critical reception. Ragawa then decided to switch to a different magazine, Hana to Yume. Her first submission to this magazine won a prize called the "Top Prize" (トップ賞). Two years later in 1990, she succeeded in achieving her debut with her one-shot manga Time Limit (タイムリミット), published in Hana to Yume issue No. 22.

Ragawa continued to create long-running manga series such as Baby & Me, New York New York, and Itsudemo Otenki Kibun. In 1995, she won the 40th Shogakukan Manga Award in the shōjo category for Baby & Me. In 2012, she won both the 36th Kodansha Manga Award in the shōnen category and an Excellence Award at the 16th Japan Media Arts Festival for Those Snow White Notes.

== Works ==
- Time Limit (one-shot, 1990)
- Baby & Me (1991–1997)
- Itsudemo Otenki Kibun (1993–2014)
- New York New York (1995–1998)
- Shanimuni Go (1998–2009)
- Those Snow White Notes (2009–2022)
- The Vampire & His Pleasant Companions (with Narise Konohara, 2016–present)
