= Bill Öhrström =

Swedish musician, singer, actor and former model

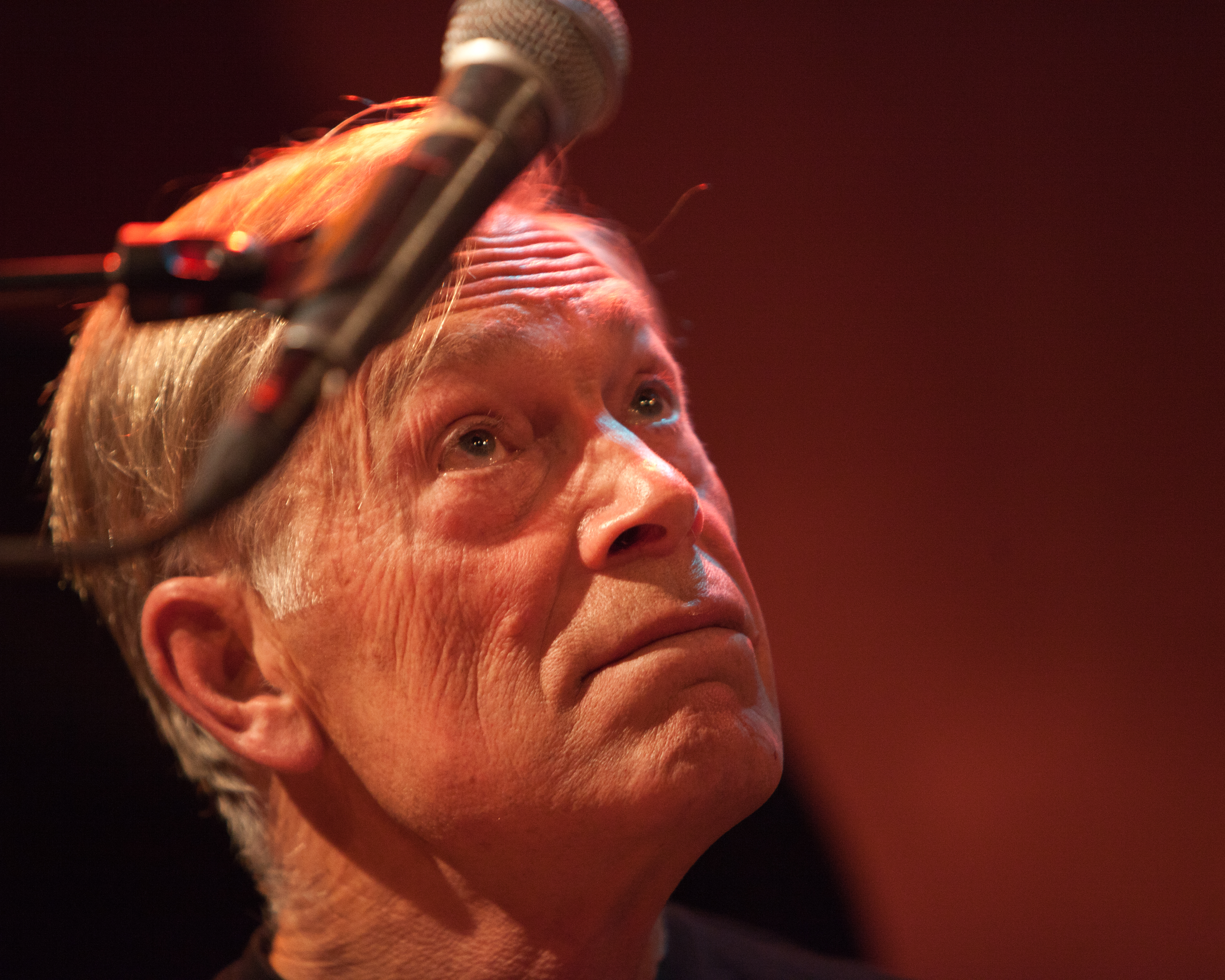
Öhrström concentrating while performing at Fasching in 2012.

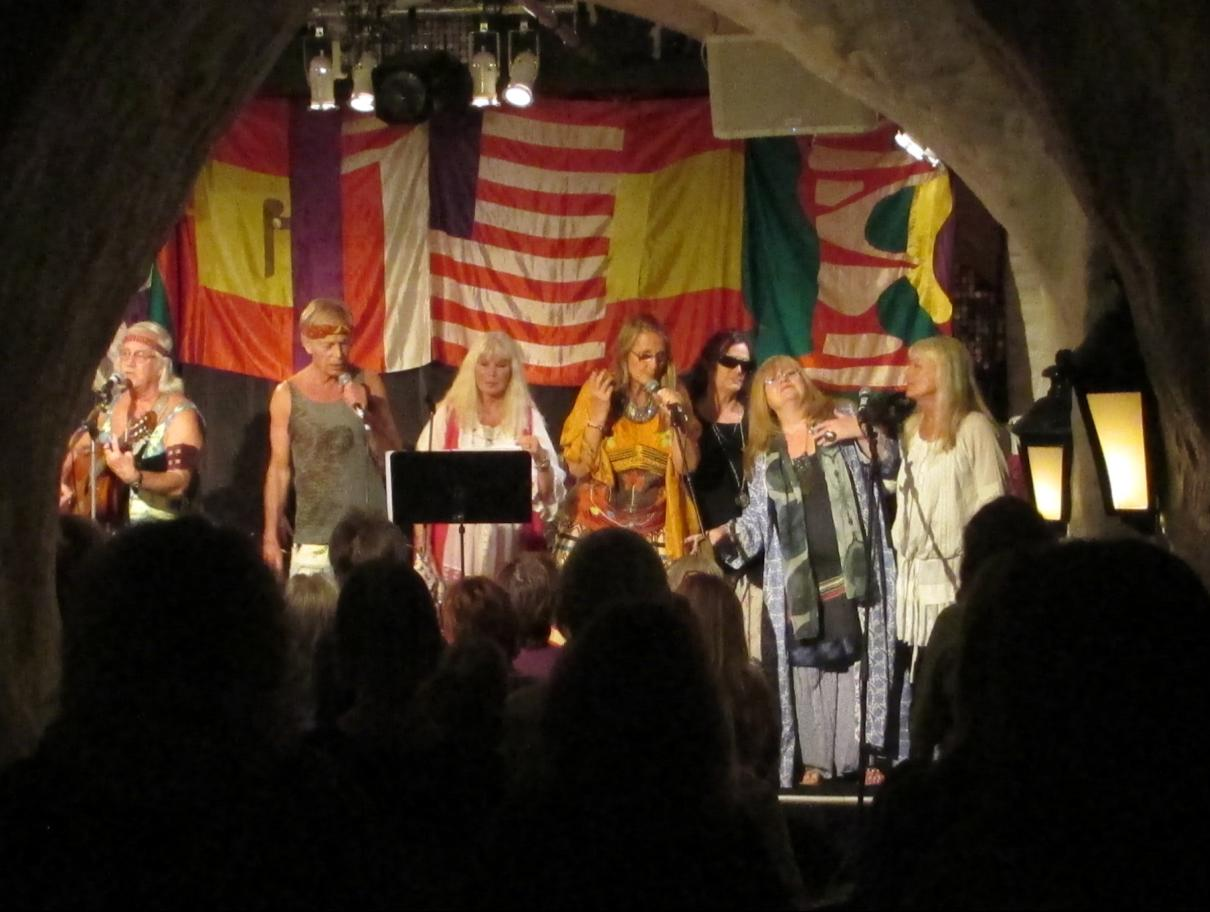
Öhrström in a 2015 Hair revival show in the Old Town of Stockholm

Bill Göran Fredrik Öhrström (born 2 April 1943) is a Swedish musician, singer, actor and former model. He has performed with Jukka Tolonen and Mikael Ramel. He started the club "Filips" in Stockholm in the 1960s, and also played the harmonica (for which he is known) in the Kent song "Kevlarsjäl".

He formed the band, Bill's Boogie Band, featuring the Finish guitarist, Jukka Tolonen, with whom he releashed, in 1987, the live album Live 'N' Lively in Helsinki. He married actress Mona Seilitz in 1977 and has also been married to singer Lisa Ekdahl with whom he has a son born in 1994.

Öhrström was a lead actor in Hår, the first European production of Hair, which opened in Stockholm on 20 September 1968 with Ulf Brunnberg in the cast, produced and directed by Pierre Fränckel and choreographed by Julie Arenal. It ran for 134 performances until March 1969, and there have been regular Stockholm revival shows since then.
