= Vem vet? =

Single by Lisa Ekdahl

from the album Lisa Ekdahl
- Released: 1994
- Genre: Jazz pop
- Length: EMI
- Songwriter: Lisa Ekdahl

"Vem vet?" (in English: "Who knows?") is a song in Swedish written and recorded by Lisa Ekdahl, and released as a single from her 1994 album, Lisa Ekdahl. The single peaked at number 4 in both Sweden and Norway. On the Eurochart Hot 100, "Vem vet?" reached number 56. The song also charted at Svensktoppen for a total of 10 weeks between 12 March-14 May 1994, topping the chart on 9 April that year. The song received significant radio airplay in Sweden, Denmark and Norway throughout the year.

== Charts ==
=== Weekly charts ===
Chart (1994)	Peak position
Europe (Eurochart Hot 100)	56
Norway (VG-lista)	4
Sweden (Sverigetopplistan)	4

=== Year-end charts ===
Chart (1994)	Position
Sweden (Sverigetopplistan)	25
