= North–South differences in the Korean language =

The Korean language has diverged between North and South Korea due to the prolonged separation and the mutual hostility between the two states.

The Korean Language Society in 1933 made the "Proposal for Unified Korean Orthography" (Korean: 한글 맞춤법 통일안; Hanja: 한글맞춤法統一案; RR: Hangeul Matchumbeop Tong-iran). But with the establishment of the Democratic People's Republic of Korea and the Republic of Korea in 1948, the two states have taken on differing policies regarding the language.

Researching language differences between North and South Korea has been challenging, and there have been reports of inaccurate results. It is hard to know how North Koreans use their standard language because North Korean defectors often speak a dialect rather than the standard language. Some scholars argue that North Korean propaganda and the South's over-interpretation of it contribute to the confusion regarding the North Korean standard language. North Korean propaganda has characterized its language as being "pure", contrary to South Korea's.

North Korea states its standard language as the language of Pyongyang. However, South Korean scholars have claimed it is more similar to the pre-divided Seoul dialect than the pre-divided Pyongyang dialect, and suggested that its pronunciation and grammar are based on the Seoul area rather than the Pyongyang area.

In some cases, South Korean schools have taught North Korean purified words that are not actually used in North Korea, leading to disputes in South Korea over whether a North Korean defector actually uses the word in North Korea. Some scholars have also doubted a study that found that the most common loan words in North Korea were not Russian loanwords but English loanwords.

== Development ==
In 1954, North Korea set out the rules for Korean orthography (Korean: 조선어 철자법; MR: Chosŏnŏ Ch'ŏlchapŏp). Although this was only a minor revision in orthography that created little difference from that used in the South, from then on, the standard languages in the North and the South gradually differed more and more from each other.

On 3 January 1964, Kim Il Sung issued his teachings on "A Number of Issues on the Development of the Korean language" (조선어를 발전시키기 위한 몇 가지 문제; Chosŏnŏrŭl Palchŏnsik'igi Wihan Myŏt Kaji Munje), and on 14 May 1966 on the topic "In Rightly Advancing the National Characteristics of the Korean language" (조선어의 민족적 특성을 옳게 살려 나갈 데 대하여; Chosŏnŏŭi Minjokchŏk T'ŭksŏngŭl Olk'e Sallyŏ Nagal Te Taehayŏ), from which the "Standard Korean Language" (조선말규범집; Chosŏnmalgyubŏmchip) rules followed in the same year, issued by the National Language Revision Committee that was directly under the control of the cabinet.

From then on, more important differences came about between the standard language in the North and the South. In 1987, North Korea revised the aforementioned rules further, and these have remained in use until today. In addition, the rules for spacing were separately laid out in the "Standard Spacing Rules in Writing Korean" (조선말 띄여쓰기규범; Chosŏnmal Ttiyŏssŭgigyubŏm) in 2000 but have since been superseded by "Rules for Spacing in Writing Korean" (띄여쓰기규정; Ttiyŏssŭgigyujŏng), issued in 2003.

South Korea continued to use the Hangeul Matchumbeop Tong-iran as defined in 1933, until its amendment "Korean Orthography" (Korean: 한글 맞춤법; RR: Hangeul Matchumbeop), together with "Standard Language Regulations" (Korean: 표준어 규정; RR: Pyojuneo Gyujeong), were issued in 1988 and amended in 2017.

As with the Korean phonology article, this article uses IPA symbols in pipes | | for morphophonemics, slashes / / for phonemes, and brackets [ ] for allophones. Pan-Korean romanized words are largely in Revised Romanization, and North Korean-specific romanized words are largely in McCune-Reischauer. For the sake of consistency, this article phonetically transcribes ㅓ as /ʌ/ for pan-Korean and South-specific phonology, and as /ɔ/ for North-specific phonology.

== Hangul / Chosŏn'gŭl ==
The same Hangul / Chosŏn'gŭl letters are used to write the language in the North and the South. However, in the North, the stroke that distinguishes ㅌ |tʰ| from ㄷ |t| is written above rather than inside the letter, as is done in the South.

In the South, the vowel digraphs and trigraphs ㅐ |ɛ|, ㅒ |jɛ|, ㅔ |e|, ㅖ |je|, ㅘ |wa|, ㅙ |wɛ|, ㅚ |ø|, ㅝ |wʌ|, ㅞ |we|, ㅟ |y|, ㅢ |ɰi|, and the consonant digraphs ㄲ |k͈|, ㄸ |t͈|, ㅃ |p͈|, ㅆ |s͈|, ㅉ |tɕ͈|, are not treated as separate letters, whereas in the North they are. Some letters and digraphs have different names in the North and in the South:

Letter	North Korean name	South Korean name
ㄱ |k|	기윽 [ki.ɯk̚]	기역 [ki.jʌk̚]
ㄷ |t|	디읃 [ti.ɯt̚]	디귿 [ti.ɡɯt̚]
ㅅ |s|	시읏 [ɕi.ɯt̚]	시옷 [ɕi.ot̚]
ㄲ |k͈|	된기윽 [tøːn.ɡi.ɯk̚]	쌍기역 [s͈aŋ.ɡi.jʌk̚]
ㄸ |t͈|	된디읃 [tøːn.di.ɯt̚]	쌍디귿 [s͈aŋ.di.ɡɯt̚]
ㅃ |p͈|	된비읍 [tøːn.bi.ɯp̚]	쌍비읍 [s͈aŋ.bi.ɯp̚]
ㅆ |s͈|	된시읏 [tøːn.ɕi.ɯt̚]	쌍시옷 [s͈aŋ.ɕi.ot̚]
ㅉ |tɕ͈|	된지읒 [tøːn.dʑi.ɯt̚]	쌍지읒 [s͈aŋ.dʑi.ɯt̚]

The names used in the South are the ones found in the Hunmongjahoe (훈몽자회, 訓蒙字會, published 1527). The names used in the North are formed mechanically with the pattern "letter + 이 + 으 + letter". Also for the tensed consonants, in the South, they are called "double" (쌍- /s͈aŋ-/) consonants, while in the North, they are called "strong" (된- /tøːn-/) consonants.

=== Sort order ===
- Initial consonants

North:	ㄱ	ㄴ	ㄷ	ㄹ	ㅁ	ㅂ	ㅅ	ㅈ	ㅊ	ㅋ	ㅌ	ㅍ	ㅎ	ㄲ	ㄸ	ㅃ	ㅆ	ㅉ	ㅇ
	[k]	[n]	[t]	[l]	[m]	[p]	[s]	[tɕ]	[tɕʰ]	[kʰ]	[tʰ]	[pʰ]	[h]	[k͈]	[t͈]	[p͈]	[s͈]	[tɕ͈]	[∅]
South:	ㄱ	ㄲ	ㄴ	ㄷ	ㄸ	ㄹ	ㅁ	ㅂ	ㅃ	ㅅ	ㅆ	ㅇ	ㅈ	ㅉ	ㅊ	ㅋ	ㅌ	ㅍ	ㅎ
	[k]	[k͈]	[n]	[t]	[t͈]	[l]	[m]	[p]	[p͈]	[s]	[s͈]	[∅]	[tɕ]	[tɕ͈]	[tɕʰ]	[kʰ]	[tʰ]	[pʰ]	[h]

- Vowels

North:	ㅏ	ㅑ	ㅓ	ㅕ	ㅗ	ㅛ	ㅜ	ㅠ	ㅡ	ㅣ	ㅐ	ㅒ	ㅔ	ㅖ	ㅚ	ㅟ	ㅢ	ㅘ	ㅝ	ㅙ	ㅞ
	[a]	[ja]	[ɔ]	[jɔ]	[o]	[jo]	[u]	[ju]	[ɯ]	[i]	[ɛ]	[jɛ]	[e]	[je]	[ø]	[y]	[ɰi]	[wa]	[wɔ]	[wɛ]	[we]
South:	ㅏ	ㅐ	ㅑ	ㅒ	ㅓ	ㅔ	ㅕ	ㅖ	ㅗ	ㅘ	ㅙ	ㅚ	ㅛ	ㅜ	ㅝ	ㅞ	ㅟ	ㅠ	ㅡ	ㅢ	ㅣ
	[a]	[ɛ]	[ja]	[jɛ]	[ʌ]	[e]	[jʌ]	[je]	[o]	[wa]	[wɛ]	[ø]	[jo]	[u]	[wʌ]	[we]	[y]	[ju]	[ɯ]	[ɰi]	[i]

- Final consonants

North:	(none)	ㄱ	ㄳ	ㄴ	ㄵ	ㄶ	ㄷ	ㄹ	ㄺ	ㄻ	ㄼ	ㄽ	ㄾ	ㄿ	ㅀ	ㅁ	ㅂ	ㅄ	ㅅ	ㅇ	ㅈ	ㅊ	ㅋ	ㅌ	ㅍ	ㅎ	ㄲ	ㅆ
South:	(none)	ㄱ	ㄲ	ㄳ	ㄴ	ㄵ	ㄶ	ㄷ	ㄹ	ㄺ	ㄻ	ㄼ	ㄽ	ㄾ	ㄿ	ㅀ	ㅁ	ㅂ	ㅄ	ㅅ	ㅆ	ㅇ	ㅈ	ㅊ	ㅋ	ㅌ	ㅍ	ㅎ

In the North, the consonant letter ㅇ (|∅| and |ŋ|) is placed between ㅅ |s| and ㅈ |tɕ| when pronounced |ŋ|, but after all consonants (i.e., after ㅉ |tɕ͈|) when used as a placeholder indicating a null initial consonant (for syllables that begin with a vowel).

== Pronunciation ==
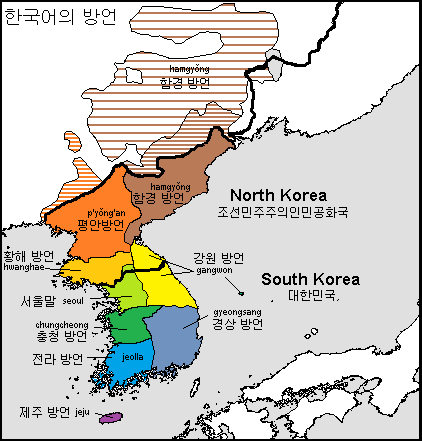
Dialects of Korean

The standard languages in the North and the South share the same types and the same number of phonemes, but there are some differences in the actual pronunciations. The South Korean standard pronunciation is based on the dialect as spoken in Seoul, and the North Korean standard pronunciation is based on the dialect as spoken in Pyongyang. However, South Korean authors have argued that the standard language of North Korea is actually not based on the Pyongyang dialect, but rather on the 1933 norms, which are based on the Seoul dialect. For example, in the view of such authors, the dialect of Pyongyang has eight monophthongs, while the standard North Korean language has 10 monophthongs, like the old Seoul dialect.

=== Consonants ===
The following differences are recognized in the consonants. In the Seoul dialect, ㅈ, ㅊ and ㅉ are typically pronounced with alveolo-palatal affricates [tɕ], [tɕʰ], [tɕ͈]. In the Pyongyang dialect, they are typically pronounced with alveolar affricates [ts], [tsʰ], [ts͈]. Also, 지 and 시 can be pronounced without palatalization as [tsi] and [si] in the Pyongyang dialect.

In the South, when ㄴ /n/ or ㄹ /l/ are at the beginning of a Sino-Korean word and are followed immediately by /i/ or /j/, they are dropped, and when ㄹ /l/ is not immediately followed by /i/ or /j/, it becomes ㄴ /n/, with this change being indicated in the orthography. But all initial ㄴ /n/ and ㄹ /l/ are written out and pronounced in the North. For instance, the common last name 이 [i] (often written out in English as Lee, staying true to the more conservative typography and pronunciation), and the word 여자 [jʌdʑa] (woman) are written and pronounced as 리 [ɾi] and 녀자 [njɔdʑa] in North Korean. Furthermore, the South Korean word 내일 [nɛiɭ], which means "tomorrow", is written and pronounced as 래일 [ɾɛiɭ] in North Korea. But this latter pronunciation was artificially crafted using older pronunciations in the 1960s, so it is common for older speakers to be unable to pronounce initial ㄴ /n/ and ㄹ /l/ properly, thus pronouncing such words in the same way as they are pronounced in the South.

In South Korea, the liquid consonant [ɾ] does not come after the nasal consonants [m] and [ŋ]. In this position, ㄹ is pronounced as [n] rather than [ɾ]. But in North Korea, ㄹ before vowels ㅑ, ㅕ, ㅛ, and ㅠ can remain [ɾ] in this context (or assimilate to [n]).

Hangul	Hanja	North	South
침략	侵略	[tsʰimnjak̚] ch'imnyak or [tsʰimɾjak̚] ch'imryak	[tɕʰimnjak̚] chimnyak
협력	協力	[hjɔmnjɔk̚] hyŏmnyŏk or [hjɔmɾjɔk̚] hyŏmryŏk	[hjʌmnjʌk̚] hyeomnyeok
식료	食料	singnyo or singryo	singnyo
청류벽	淸流壁	ch'ŏngnyubyŏk or ch'ŏngryubyŏk	cheongnyubyeok

=== Vowels ===
Some South Korean linguists argue that the vowel system in the North Korean standard is based on the Pyongyang dialect. The vowel ㅓ /ʌ/ is not as rounded in the Seoul dialect as it is in the Pyongyang dialect. If expressed in IPA, it would be [ʌ̹] or [ɔ̜] for the one in Seoul dialect and [ɔ] for the one in Pyongyang dialect. Due to this roundedness, speakers of the Seoul dialect would find that ㅓ as pronounced by speakers of the Pyongyang dialect sounds close to the vowel ㅗ /o/. Additionally, the difference between the vowels ㅐ /ɛ/ and ㅔ /e/ is slowly diminishing amongst the younger speakers of the Seoul dialect. It is not well known if this is also happening with the Pyongyang dialect.

However, other South Korean linguists have argued that North Korean linguistic texts suggest that the vowel system and articulation positions of the North Korean standard language were completely consistent with those of the South. In particular, the rules stipulated 10 monophthongs, just like the old Seoul dialect.

=== Pitch ===
The pitch patterns in the Pyongyang and Seoul dialects differ, but there has been little research in detail. On the other hand, in the Chosŏnmal Taesajŏn (조선말대사전), published in 1992, where the pitches for certain words are shown in a three-pitch system, a word such as 꾀꼬리 ([k͈øk͈oɾi] "black-naped oriole") is marked as having pitch "232" (where "2" is low and "3" is high), from which one can see some difference in pitch patterns from the Seoul dialect.

== Orthography ==
=== Inflected words ===
==== Informal non-polite suffix 어/여 ====
In words in which the word stem ends in ㅣ |i|, ㅐ |ɛ|, ㅔ |e|, ㅚ |ø|, ㅟ |y|, ㅢ |ɰi|, in forms where -어 /-ʌ/ is appended to these endings in the South, but -여 /-jɔ/ is instead appended in the North. In actual pronunciation, however, the [j] sound often accompanies the pronunciation of such words, even in the South.

Inflected word	North inflection	South inflection	Meaning
피다 [pʰida]	피여 [pʰijɔ] p'iyŏ	피어 (펴) [pʰiʌ] ([pʰjʌ]) pi-eo (pyeo)	bloom
내다 [nɛːda]	내여 [nɛjɔ] nae-yŏ	내어 (내) [nɛʌ] nae-eo(nae)	take out
세다 [seːda]	세여 [sejɔ] se-yŏ	세어 (세) [seʌ] se-eo(se)	count
되다 [tøda(tweda)]	되여 [tøjɔ] toe-yŏ	되어 (돼) [tøʌ,tweʌ],([twɛ,twe]) doe-eo (dwae)	become
뛰다 [t͈wida]	뛰여 [t͈wijɔ] ttwi-yŏ	뛰어 [t͈wiʌ] ttwi-eo	jump
희다 [çida]	희여 [çijɔ] hi-yŏ	희어 [çiʌ,çijʌ] hi-eo	white

==== Indication of tensed consonants after word endings that end with ㄹ ====
In word endings where the final consonant is ㄹ |l|, where the South spells -ㄹ까 (|-[l.k͈a]|) and -ㄹ쏘냐 (|-[l.s͈o.nja]|) to indicate the tensed consonants, in the North these are spelled -ㄹ가 |-l.ka|，-ㄹ소냐 |-l.so.nja| instead. These etymologically are formed by attaching to the adnominal form (관형사형 gwanhyeongsahyeong) that ends in ㄹ, and in the North, the tensed consonants are denoted with normal consonants. Also, the word ending -ㄹ게 |-l.ɡe| used to be spelled -ㄹ께 |-l.k͈e| in the South, but has since been changed in the Hangeul Matchumbeop of 1988, and is now spelled -ㄹ게 just like in the North.

=== Sino-Korean words ===
==== Initial sound rule ====
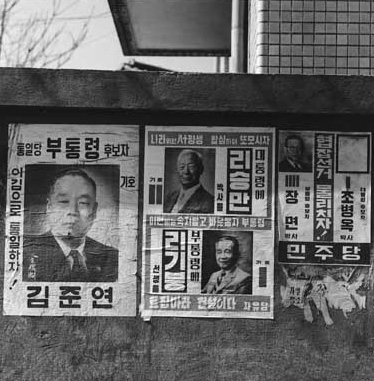
A poster of March 1960 South Korean presidential election, where candidates Syngman Rhee and Lee Ki-poong have their surnames spelled "리", not following the modern South Korean convention of spelling that surname "이".

Initial ㄴ |n| / ㄹ |l| appearing in Sino-Korean words are kept in the North. In the South, in Sino-Korean words that begin with ㄹ which is followed by the vowel sound [i] or the semivowel sound [j] (when ㄹ is followed by one of ㅣ |i|, ㅑ |ja|, ㅕ |jʌ|, ㅖ |je|, ㅛ |jo| and ㅠ |ju|), ㄹ is replaced by ㅇ |∅|; when this ㄹ is followed by other vowels it is replaced by ㄴ |n|. In the North, the initial ㄹ is kept.

North	South	Hanja	Meaning
리성계 [ɾisɔŋɡje] Ri Sŏnggye	이성계 [isʌŋɡje] I Seonggye	李成桂	Yi Seong-gye
련습 [ɾjɔːnsɯp̚] ryŏnsŭp	연습 [jʌːnsɯp̚] yeonseup	練習	practice
락하 [ɾakʰa] rak'a	낙하 [nakʰa] naka	落下	fall
랭면 [ɾɛŋ.mjɔn] raengmyŏn	냉면 [nɛŋ.mjʌn] naengmyeon	冷麵	cold noodles
로동 [ɾodoŋ] rodong	노동 [ɾʌdʌŋ] nodong	勞動	labor

Similarly, in Sino-Korean words that begin with ㄴ |n| and is followed by the vowel sound [i] or the semi-vowel sound [j] (when ㄴ is followed by one of ㅣ |i|, ㅕ |jʌ|, ㅛ |jo| and ㅠ |ju|), in the South, this ㄴ is replaced by ㅇ |∅|, but this remains unchanged in the North.

North	South	Hanja	Meaning
니승 [nisɯŋ] nisŭng	이승 [isɯŋ] iseung	尼僧	priestess
녀자 [njɔdʑa] nyŏja	여자 [jʌdʑa] yeoja	女子	woman
륙 [ɾjuk̚] ryuk	육 [juk̚] yuk	六	six
룡 [ɾjoŋ] ryong	용 [joŋ] yong	龍	dragon

These are thus pronounced as written in the North as ㄴ |n| and ㄹ |l|. However, even in the South, sometimes in order to disambiguate the surnames 유 (柳 Yu [ju]) and 임 (林 Im [im]) from 유 (兪 Yu [ju]) and 임 (任 Im [im]), the former may be written or pronounced as 류 Ryu ([ɾju]) and 림 Rim 林 ([ɾim]).

==== Hanja pronunciation ====
Where a Hanja is written 몌 |mje| or 폐 |pʰje| in the South, this is written 메 |me|, 페 |pʰe| in the North (but even in the South, these are pronounced 메 /me/, 페 /pʰe/).

North	South	Hanja	Meaning
메별 |mebjɔl| mebyŏl	몌별 |mjebjʌl| myebyeol	袂別	sad separation
페쇄 |pʰeːswɛ| p'eswae	폐쇄 |pʰjeːswɛ| pyeswae	閉鎖	closure

Some hanja characters are pronounced differently.

North	South	Hanja
거 |kɔ| kŏ	갹 |kjak̚| gyak	醵
외 |ø| oe	왜 |wɛ| wae	歪

Also in the North, the hanja 讐 is usually pronounced as 수 su [su], except in the word 怨讐/원쑤 wŏnssu ("enemy"), where it is pronounced as 쑤 ssu [s͈u]. It is thought that this is to avoid the word becoming a homonym with 元帥 ("marshal"), written as 원수 wŏnsu |wɔn.su|.

==== Word stems in compound words ====
While the general rule is to write out the word stem from which the compound word is formed in its original form, but in cases where the etymological origin is no longer remembered, this is no longer written in original form. This happens both in the North and in the South. However, whether a compound word is seen to have its etymological origin forgotten or not is seen differently by different people:

North	South	Meaning
옳바르다 |olh.pa.lɯ.ta|	올바르다 |ol.pa.lɯ.ta|	upright
벗꽃 |pɔs.k͈otɕʰ|	벚꽃 |pʌtɕ.k͈otɕʰ|	cherry blossom

In the first example, in the South, the 올 |ol| part shows that the etymological origin is forgotten, and the word is written as pronounced as 올바르다 [olbaɾɯda] olbareuda, but in the North, the first part is seen to come from 옳다 olt'a |olh.ta| and thus the whole word is written 옳바르다 olbarŭda (pronounced the same as in the South). Conversely, in the second example, the South spelling catches the word as the combination of 벚 beot and 꽃 kkot, but in the North, this is no longer recognized and thus the word is written as pronounced as 벗꽃 pŏtkkot.

== Spacing ==
In the South, the rules of spacing are not very clear-cut, but in the North, these are very precise. In general, compared to the North, the writing in the South tends to include more spacing. One likely explanation is that the North remains closer to the Sinitic orthographical heritage, where spacing is less of an issue than with a syllabary or alphabet such as Hangul. The main differences are indicated below.

=== Bound nouns ===
Before bound nouns (North: 불완전명사: purwanjŏn myŏngsa/不完全名詞 "incomplete nouns"; South: 의존 명사: uijon myeongsa/依存名詞 "dependent nouns"), a space is added in the South but not in the North. This applies to counter words also, but the space is sometimes allowed to be omitted in the South.

North	South	Meaning
내것 naegŏt	내 것 nae geot	my thing
할수 있다 halsu itta	할 수 있다 hal su ittda	to be able to do
한개 hangae	한 개 han gae	one thing (counter word)

=== Auxiliaries ===
Before auxiliaries, a space is inserted in the South but not in the North. Depending on the situation, however, the space may be omitted in the South.

North	South	Meaning
먹어보다 mŏgŏboda	먹어 보다/먹어보다 meogeo boda	to try to eat
올듯하다 oldŭt'ada	올 듯하다/올듯하다 ol deutada	to seem to come
읽고있다 ilkkoitta	읽고 있다 ilkko ittda	to be reading
자고싶다 chagosip'ta	자고 싶다 jago sipda	to want to sleep

In the above, in the rules of the South, auxiliaries coming after -아/-어 or an adnominal form allow the space before them to be omitted, but the space after -고 cannot be omitted.

=== Compound nouns ===
Compound nouns that indicate a single concept in principle are written with spaces in the South, as in English, and without spaces in the North, as in other Germanic languages like German.

North	South	Hanja	Meaning
국어사전 kugŏsajŏn	국어 사전 gugeo sajeon	國語辭典	Korean dictionary
경제부흥상황 kyŏngjepuhŭngsanghwang	경제 부흥 상황 gyeongje buheung sanghwang	經濟復興狀況	state of economic recovery
서울대학교 인문대학 Sŏultaehakkyo Inmuntaehak	서울 대학교 인문 대학／서울대학교 인문대학 Seoul Daehakgyo Inmun Daehak	서울大學校人文大學	Faculty of Humanities of Seoul National University

Note that, although spacing rules are technically standardized in the South, they are often optional, region-dependent, or simply not adhered to. Moreover, individual South Korean speakers might disagree on what counts as "a single concept" and thus space compound nouns differently.

== Morphology ==
=== Nominal Morphology ===
==== Sai siot (사이 시옷, "middle ㅅ -s") ====
When forming compound words from uninflected words, where the so-called "sai siot" (-ㅅ- interfix), originating from an Old Korean genitive suffix, is inserted in the South. This is left out in the North.

North	South	Pronunciation	Meaning
저가락 |tɕɔ.ka.lak|	젓가락 |tɕʌs.ka.lak|	젇까락 [tɕʌt̚k͈aɾak̚] chŏtkkarak/jeotkkarak or 저까락 [tɕʌk͈aɾak̚] chŏkkarak/jeokkarak	chopsticks
나무잎 |na.mu.ipʰ|	나뭇잎 |na.mus.ipʰ|	나문닙 [namunnip̚] namunnip	(tree) leaf

=== Pronominal Morphology ===
==== Second person pronoun 동무 tongmu ====
Besides the deferential second person pronoun 당신 tangsin, which is a noun in origin, there is the pronoun 동무 tongmu (plural 동무들 tongmudŭl), from a noun meaning "friend, comrade", in North Korea that may be used when speaking to peers.

==== Third person feminine pronoun ====
The third person feminine pronoun in South Korea is 그녀 geu-nyeo (plural 그녀들 geu-nyeodeul) while in North Korea it is 그 녀자 kŭ nyŏja (plural 그 녀자들 kŭ nyŏjadŭl), both literally meaning "that woman".

=== Verbal Morphology ===
==== Informal polite suffix 오 -o ====
In the South, the polite suffixes are 요 /-jo/ after a vowel and 아요/어요 /-ajo, -ʌjo/ after a consonant. In the North, the suffixes 오 /-o/ and 소 /-s͈o/ are appended after a vowel and a consonant respectively. The northern forms of the suffix are older and considered obsolete in South Korea now. However, suffixes such as 아요/어요 and 요 are not uncommon in North Korea, and are even used in the nursery rhyme "대홍단감자(Daehongdan Potato)," which is a common expression in the standard North Korean language that can be used for children.

Informal polite suffix
Inflected word	North inflection	South inflection	Meaning
가다 [kada]	가오 [kao] ka-o	가요 [kajo] ka-yo	go
먹다 [mʌk̚t͈a]	먹소 [mɔk̚s͈o] mŏk-so	먹어요 [mʌɡʌjo] meog-eoyo	eat
뛰다 [t͈wida]	뛰오 [t͈wio] ttwi-o	뛰어요 [t͈wiʌjo] ttwi-eoyo	jump

==== ㅂ p-irregular inflections ====
In the South, when the word root of a ㅂ-irregular inflected word has two or more syllables (for example, 고맙다 [komap̚t͈a] gomapda), the ㅂ is dropped and replaced with 우 in the next syllable. When conjugated to the polite speech level, the ㅂ-irregular stem resyllabifies with the 어요 -eoyo conjugation to form 워요 -woyo (as in 고맙다 gomapda → 고마우 gomau → 고마워요 gomaweoyo), appearing to ignore vowel harmony. ㅂ is not replaced with 우 in the North (as it also was in the South before the 1988 Hangeul Matchumbeop). The vowel harmony is kept in both the South and the North if the word root has only one syllable (for example, 돕다 [toːp̚t͈a] topta/dopda).

Inflected word	North inflection	South inflection	Meaning
고맙다 [komap̚t͈a]	고마와 [komawa] komawa	고마워 [komawʌ] gomawo	thankful
가깝다 [kak͈ap̚t͈a]	가까와 [kak͈awa] kakkawa	가까워 [kak͈awʌ] gakkawo	near

== Vocabulary ==
The standard language in the South (표준어/標準語 pyojuneo) is largely based on the Seoul dialect, and the standard language (문화어/文化語 munhwaŏ) in the North is largely based on the Pyongyang dialect. However, both in the North and in the South, the vocabulary and forms of the standard language come from Sajeonghan Joseoneo Pyojunmal Mo-eum/Sajŏnghan Chŏson-ŏ P'yochunmal Moŭm 사정한 조선어 표준말 모음 published by the Korean Language Society in 1936, and so there is very little difference in the basic vocabulary between the standard languages used in the North and the South. Nevertheless, due to the difference in political systems and social structure, each country is constantly adding different words to its vocabulary.

=== Differences due to the difference in political system or social structure ===
North	South	Meaning
조선 (朝鮮) Chosŏn	한국 (韓國) Hanguk	Korea (as a whole)
조선옷 (朝鮮옷) Chosŏn-ot	한복 (韓服) Hanbok	Korean clothes (Hanbok)
조선반도비무장지대 (朝鮮半島非武裝地帶) Chosŏnbandobimujangjidae	한반도 비무장 지대 (韓半島非武裝地帶) Hanbando Bimujang jidae	Korean Demilitarized Zone
조선인 (朝鮮人) Chosŏnin	한국인 (韓國人) Hangugin	Korean people
조선반도 (朝鮮半島) Chosŏnbando	한반도 (韓半島) Hanbando	Korean Peninsula
조국해방전쟁 (祖國解放戰爭) Choguk'aepangjŏnjaeng	한국 전쟁 (韓國戰爭) Hanguk jeonjaeng	Korean War
소학교 (小學校) sohakkyo	초등학교 (初等學校) chodeunghakkyo	elementary school
동무 (同務) tongmu	친구 (親舊) chingu	friend
국방성 (國防省) kukbangsŏng	국방부 (國防部) gukbangbu	Ministry of Defense
외무상 (外務相) oemusang	외교부 장관 (外交部長官) oegyobu janggwan	Minister of Foreign Affairs

The word 동무 tongmu/dongmu that is used to mean "friend" in the North was originally used across the whole of Korea, but after the division of Korea, North Korea began to use it as a translation of the Russian term товарищ (friend, comrade), and since then, the word has come to mean "comrade" in the South as well and has fallen out of use there.

Words related to bureaucracies were used differently after two Korean states were proclaimed in 1948. In the North, ministries are generally called 성 sŏng/seong, and ministers are generally called 상 sang, as in Japanese 省. In the South, ministries are called 부 bu (Chinese 部), and ministers are called 장관 janggwan (Chinese 長官).

In the North, for words relating to the country of Korea like Korea as a whole or Korean clothes, the word 조선 Chosŏn is used. This word has a Chinese origin and refers to the oldest name of the civilization of the Korean peninsula which appeared in Chinese records. North Koreans use this word to refer to their country and the country of Korea as a whole, and they refer to South Korea as 대한민국 Daehan Minguk. In South Korea, Korea is called 한국 Hanguk, which is a shortened version that came from the earlier versions Daehan Jeguk from 1897 that signified the start of the Korean Empire and Daehan Minguk which was chosen for Korea's government-in-exile in 1919.

=== Differences in words of foreign origin ===
South Korea has borrowed a lot of English words, but North Korea has borrowed from other languages, notably Russian, and there are numerous differences in words used between the two coming from these different borrowings. Even when the same English word is borrowed, how this word is transliterated into Korean may differ between the North and the South, resulting in different words being adapted into the corresponding standard languages. For names of other nations and their places, the principle is to base the transliteration on the English word in the South and to base the transliteration on the word in the original language (or sometimes Russian) in the North.

North			South			Meaning
Korean	Transliteration	Origin	Korean	Transliteration	Origin	Meaning
뜨락또르	ttŭrakttorŭ	Russian трактор (traktor)	트랙터	teuraekteo	English tractor	tractor
스토킹	sŭt'ok'ing	British English stocking	스타킹	seutaking	American English stocking	stocking
왁찐	wakjjin	German vakzine	백신	baeksin	English vaccine	vaccine
메히꼬	Mehikko	Spanish México	멕시코	Meksiko	English Mexico	Mexico
뽈스까	Ppolsŭkka	Polish Polska	폴란드	Pollandeu	English Poland	Poland
도이췰란드	Toich'wil-landŭ	German Deutschland	독일	Dog-il	Japanese 独逸 (Doitsu) (orthographic borrowing)	Germany

Other differences include Korean words from the North Korean variety that have been created during the "language purification movement". These are Korean words that were influenced by foreign languages, such as Mandarin and Japanese due to prolonged language contact. In North Korea, these words have been "purified" and now consist of only native Korean words. For example the word from the South Korean standard variety 만원 manweon, which means "packed to the limit". Man stems from the Chinese word for full. In North Korea, the word for this is 자리없음 chariŏpsŭm which literally translates to "no vacancy".

Further foreign influences are noticeable in recently developed neologisms in South Korea, especially in language used by youth. Globalization and social media have played a big role in the integration of English into the Korean language in the south, while it has very little effect on the language in the North because of restricted contact with the outside world. The English words that are used by youth are blended with the Korean language, creating hybrids that are intended for fostering peer connection, humor, and social critique. These hybrid neologisms include but are not limited to borrowing and code-switching, because they consist of creative linguistic forms and expressive tools through which global cultural currents are articulated. This type of linguistic phenomenon is reinforced in South Korea because of its emphasis on English education, digital culture, and high exposure to global media. These factors face extreme limitations in the North, leading to different linguistic outcomes. Examples of these hybrid words include: 꿀팁 kkultip (kkul means honey, conveying the idea of a sweet piece of advice) and 헬조선 heljoseon (this word is used as social commentary to compare contemporary South Korean society to the highly stratified Joseon Dynasty). Research has shown that South Korean youth uses these types of utterances without being aware of it, which proves how it has become a consistent part of youngsters' daily speech instead of it being marked borrowing.

Though there is little research on this phenomenon in the North Korean language, the government's anti-American propaganda and restrictive lifestyle in terms of media create little room for ongoing foreign influenced linguistic change. Whereas the linguistic landscape of numerous languages is constantly changing because of language contact, North Korea's closed-off society is the exception to this rule. The different relationship that the two Koreas have with the United States also plays a role in this. South Korea has close political relations with the United States, and within its society, English is viewed as a prestigious language. In North Korea, the anti-imperialist propaganda does not perceive the United States favorably, leading to less English loanwords and more loanwords from preferred countries such as Russia.

=== Differences due to linguistic purism in vocabulary ===
Since the division of the Korean peninsula, vocabulary has become one of the most visible markers of divergence between the two Koreas.

The Korean language has become a porous membrane through the adoption of English loanwords known as Konglish, which is a shorthand for modernity and internationalism at an exponential rate. In contrast, North Korea views the infiltration of foreign loanwords as a symptom of cultural erosion. Under the guidance of the state’s rigorous language policy known as Munhwaŏ, North Korean government employs a process of "purification," replacing foreign concepts with native Korean roots or descriptive Sino-Korean compounds.

The following table illustrates the stark contrast between the descriptive, purist approach of the North and the loanword-heavy vocabulary of the South.

North			South		Meaning
Korean	Transliteration	Literal meaning	Korean	Transliteration	Meaning
고기겹빵	kogigyŏppang	meat-layer bread	햄버거	haembeogeo	hamburger
얼음과자 (얼음菓子)	ŏrŭmgwaja	ice pop	아이스크림	aiseukeulim	ice cream
단물	tanmul	sweet water	주스	juseu	juice
손전화 (손電話)	sonjŏnhwa	hand phone	스마트폰	seumateupon	smartphone
전자계산기 (電子計算機)	chŏnjagyesan'gi	electronic calculator	컴퓨터	keompyuteo	computer
봉사차 (奉仕車)	pongsacha	service car	택시	taeksi	taxi

This divergence in vocabulary is not merely a matter of translation but reflects two different philosophies of language acquisition. Where a Seoulite sees 햄버거 haembeogeo, a Pyongyangite sees 고기겹빵 kogigyŏppang. One is a transliteration of a global brand; the other is a literal description of the object's physical properties.

North Korean neologisms tend to be descriptive and compound-based. For example, 고기겹빵 breaks down into 고기, 겹, and 빵. This is a linguistic strategy to make a foreign concept immediately understandable through native descriptors. Similarly, the term 단물 which literally means to "sweet water", replaced the phonetic loanword "juice." This reflects a desire to ground the language in physical properties rather than foreign brandings.

South Korean vocabulary relies heavily on Konglish. Terms like 컴퓨터 are phonetic transcriptions of English. In the South, using the English loanword often conveys a sense of modernity, professionalism, or globalism. While the North uses 전자계산기, which is technically accurate, it is perceived in the South as an antiquated term used only in formal or technical manuals from the 1970s.

Beyond simple consumer goods, the North has repurposed vocabulary to align with state goals. The term 봉사차, meaning "service car," removes the commercial connotation of a "taxi" (a word of French/English origin) and replaces it with a term emphasizing "service" to the people, framing transportation as a social utility rather than a commercial transaction.

As a result, the two dialects have drifted to a point where specific terminology can create a "linguistic gap" that can hinder communication. A visitor from Seoul to Pyongyang may find that while the basic grammar remains identical, the specialized vocabulary of daily life, requires a mental "translation" process. In the South, the influence of English is viewed as a natural evolution of a global language; in the North, it is viewed as a cultural pollutant to be filtered out through the state's linguistic identity that serves as a tool for nationalistic pride and ideological separation.

=== Other differences in vocabulary ===
These words are part of the Northern dialects and have become accepted as official words.

North		South		Meaning
Korean	Transliteration	Korean	Transliteration	Meaning
강냉이 (江냉이)	kangnaeng-i	옥수수 (玉蜀黍)	oksusu	corn
달구지	talguji	수레	sure	cow cart
게사니	kesani	거위	geowi	goose
마치	mach'i	망치	mangchi	hammer
부루	puru	상추	sangchu	lettuce
우	u	위	wi	on, above

Words like 강냉이 kangnaeng-i and 우 u are also sometimes heard in various dialects in South Korea.

There are also words that exist only in the North. The verb 마스다 masŭda (to break) and its passive form 마사지다 masajida (to be broken) have no exactly corresponding words in the South.

== Issues ==
Kim Il Sung claimed in his speech from 1966 that the Korean language spoken in Seoul used too many foreign words and has become a mixed language. He stated that loanwords from Chinese, English, and Japanese have taken over more than half of the total vocabulary of Korean language. He used this statement as a motive to create a new standard language in North Korea which he called "cultured language". Though Kim's plan was to "purify" the Korean language in the North, this standard variety still includes many loanwords from foreign languages, in particular Russian.

In 1972, South Koreans came in direct contact with North Koreans during the South-North talks and realized their languages had diverged more than they previously expected. Some terms were completely unintelligible, and some expressions turned out to have totally different semantic connotations. Though Koreans presumed that these dissimilarities were due to dialectal variations, dialectal differences in Korea have never had trouble understanding each other. These differences were mostly the result of North Korea's linguistic reforms.

In February 1987, a KBS news report showed that the spoken languages between the North Korean and South Korean people were already "divorced" under Kim Il Sung's policies, with some daily used words by North Koreans sounding strange to South Koreans, and some aggressive terms were frequently used by North Koreans.

During the 2018 Winter Olympics, the two Korean countries decided to play jointly for the Korea women's national ice hockey team. This led to issues with the South Korean athletes communicating with the North Korean athletes since the former uses English-influenced words in their postwar vocabulary, especially for hockey, while the latter uses only Korean-inspired words for their postwar vocabulary.

The language differences also pose challenges for researchers and for the tens of thousands of people who have defected from one side to the other since the Korean War. The defectors face difficulty and notably discrimination because they lack vocabulary, use differing accents, or have not culturally assimilated yet so may not understand jokes or references to pop culture. South Koreans see the North Korean accent as strange and old-fashioned, making it a constant target of mockery and further exacerbating problems with North Korean integration.

The differences among northern and southern dialects have become so significant that many North Korean defectors reportedly have had great difficulty communicating with South Koreans after having initially settled into South Korea. In response to the diverging vocabularies, an app called Univoca was designed to help North Korean defectors learn South Korean terms by translating them into North Korean ones.

Meanwhile, in South Korea, some South Korean linguists and North Korean defectors have argued that South Korean media and education overemphasize or exaggerate the differences between North Korean and South Korean languages. At the 2014 National Conference of the Korean Language and Literature Association, Yonsei University professor Hong Yun-pyo argued that language differences between North and South Korea were exaggerated in the context of the Cold War.

According to Hong, after the Korean War, words like dongmu (동무; comrade, friend) and inmin (인민; people), that had been in common use in South Korea before, had disappeared. Hong reported that if anyone used them in the South, they could be reported to the authorities, since this was important evidence of espionage. The language differences between the North and South continued to be exaggerated. The language of the North was used to promote anti-communist ideology. He even said that research on North Korean in South Korea "has not been done with actual language materials."

Journalist Joo Sung-ha, a North Korean defector, and Park No-pyeong, a North Korean defector who worked as a professor in North Korea, claimed that there are exaggerations, such as claiming that vocabulary that is unfamiliar to South Koreans but also unfamiliar to North Koreans is common in North Korea, or claiming vocabulary that is different from the North Korean standard as the standard in North Korea. For example, he said that there are rumors in South Korea that the word jeon-gu (전구; bulb) is called bural (불알; balls) in North Korea, which is not true. Most North Korean defectors spoke the dialect of their homeland, not the standard North Korean language, which has some similarities to the standard South Korean language, and it is believed that many did not even know the standard North Korean language when they arrived in South Korea.

North Korean officials and propaganda place emphasis on purity of its language and claims to have reduced the use of foreign loan words. Some North Korean officials have criticized the South Korean language as "impure". Many foreign loan words appear in North Korean dictionaries and textbooks, however. North Korean defectors say they knew that the language spoken by South Koreans contained foreign words, but they did not realize that the language they used in North Korea also contained many foreign words.

In South Korea, the idea that there are linguistic differences between the languages of North and South Korea gained traction until the mid-to-late 2010s. However, as exploration of the actual language of North Korea has progressed, it has been argued that any differences in communication between the two Koreas stem from "cultural" differences, such as economic conditions and traditional ways of expression in certain regions.

For example, North Korean defectors who have fled the country tend to have more direct communication habits that reveal their true feelings compared to South Korean language etiquette, which is prominent in defectors' hometowns but rare in other areas where defection is rare, such as Pyongyang.

Research on Korean language education for North Korean defector youth challenges the view that treats North Korean language variants as 'a foreign language' to South Korea. Studies have shown that these students sometimes outperformed South Korean students on questions requiring native speaker intuition, indicating that language abilities between North and South Korean youth are not significantly different in terms of Korean native language use. The research argues against approaching these students as multicultural learners (similar to foreigners) and recommends avoiding perspectives that overemphasize their North Korean origins as disadvantageous factors. Instead, it suggests that educational approaches should acknowledge their shared Korean linguistic heritage while recognizing the unique family backgrounds, developmental environments, and educational experiences of North Korean defector youth, rather than demanding unilateral adaptation to South Korean language learning methods.

The North Korean government has become increasingly wary of the Korean Wave and, as a result, of slang that reflects South Korean culture since 2020. In January 2023, North Korea adopted the Pyongyang Cultural Language Protection Act that could lead to public execution for excessive use of South Korean slang, which the North's government labeled as "puppet language" or "koeroemal (괴뢰말)." The word oppa (오빠, originally used by a younger sister in reference to her elder brother, but which, in South Korea, also became a way for a younger woman to refer to her male lover in a romantic relationship) was a prime example of this.

Some North Korean officials working for foreign trade in China in 2025 were reported to have pretended to be South Korean for non-state affairs such as eating at a restaurant, but 'any Chinese person could immediately discern their true origin the second they opened their mouth [due to their accent and manner of speech]'.

== See also ==
- Korean language in China
- Koryo-mar
- National Institute of Korean Language (South Korea)
- New Korean Orthography (North Korea)
- DDR German, another instance of dialectal diversion caused by post-World War II partitions
