= Korean Wave =

Global rise in popularity of Korean culture

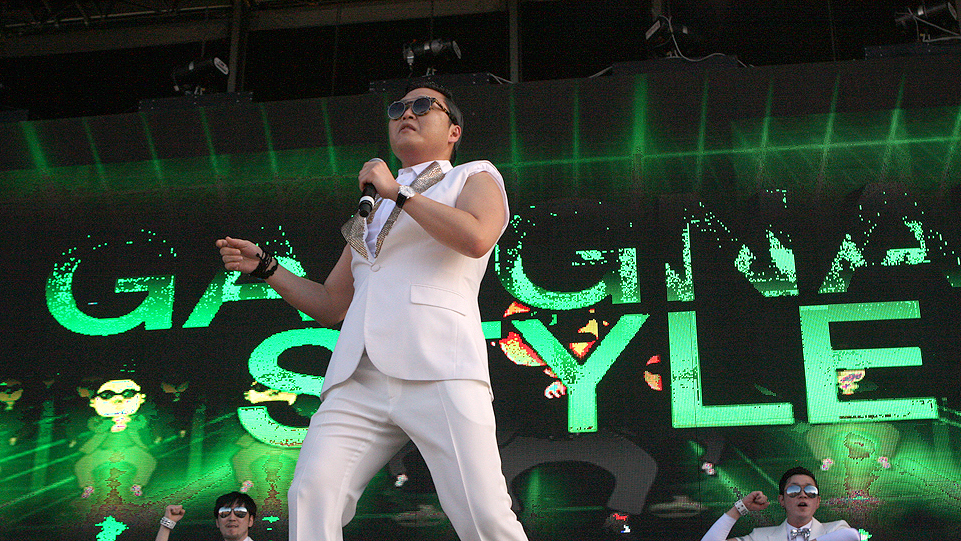
- South Korean K-pop rapper Psy performing "Gangnam Style" in Sydney in 2013

Korean name
- Hangul: 한류
- Hanja: 韓流
- RR: hallyu
- MR: hallyu
- IPA: [ˈha(ː)ʎʎu]

The Korean Wave, or hallyu (Korean: 한류; IPA: [ˈha(ː)ʎʎu]), refers to the rise in global interest in South Korean popular culture that has spread rapidly since the 1990s. It is led by the spread of K-pop, K-dramas, K-beauty, K-food, and films, with key successes including K-pop groups BTS and Blackpink, the Oscar-winning film Parasite (2019) and the Netflix television series Squid Game (2021–2025). The Korean Wave has been recognized as a form of soft power and a significant economic asset for South Korea, generating revenue through cultural exports and tourism.

Following the 1997 Asian financial crisis and the end of military censorship over the South Korean entertainment industry, the country emerged as a major exporter of popular culture. The growth of satellite media in the late 1990s helped spread K-dramas and Korean cinema across East Asia and parts of Southeast Asia. Chinese journalists coined the term "Korean Wave" (Chinese: 韩流; pinyin: hánliú) in 1999 to describe the growing popularity of South Korean cultural products. During the 2000s, hallyu expanded into Southeast Asia, South Asia, the Middle East, and Eastern Europe. By 2008, South Korea's cultural exports surpassed its cultural imports for the first time. The rise of social media and global internet platforms helped the Korean entertainment industry reach overseas audiences and gain support from the South Korean government.

== Etymology ==
The term "hallyu" (한류; 韓流) is a neologism composed of two root words: han (한; 韓), meaning "Korean", and ryu (류; 流), meaning "flow", "wave", or "trend". On 19 November 1999, Beijing Youth Daily published the first known use of the term "Korean Wave" (Chinese: 韩流; pinyin: hánliú; lit. 'Korean wave') in an article describing the "zeal of Chinese audiences for Korean TV dramas and pop songs". Other terms used at the time included "Korean tide", "Korean heat", and "Korean wind". In China, the term "Han fever" was also used, comparing the phenomenon to the avian flu pandemic in the country. The term entered common usage following the airing of the romance K-drama Winter Sonata, which was particularly successful in Japan.

Hallyu refers to the international diffusion of South Korean culture since the 1990s, following the end of military rule and the liberalization of the popular culture industry. The term primarily refers to the spread of Korean television, pop music, film, and fashion, but can also include animation, video games, technology, literature, cosmetics, and food. While the first generation of hallyu in the late 1990s to early 2000s remained confined to Asia and referred to the popularity of Korean dramas and film on the continent, the second generation, or hallyu 2.0, was driven primarily by the popularity of K-pop distributed on online platforms like YouTube. Both "hallyu" and "Korean Wave" were added to the Oxford English Dictionary in 2021.

== Background ==
Under the military dictatorship of Park Chung Hee, South Korean mass media underwent a process of rapid expansion, despite facing increasing control and censorship from the government. As part of Park's development plans, the first commercial radio and television stations opened in the early 1960s and were subject to strict censorship under the Broadcasting Ethics Committee (Korean: 방송윤리위원회). This brief expansion ended in 1972, when Park enacted the Yushin Constitution which broadly expanded his powers and codified his de facto dictatorial rule. The enactment of the Yushin Constitution coincided with a broad crackdown on the South Korean culture industry against what Park alleged was the influence of "foreign decadent culture". Following Park's death and the 1979 coup d'état of December Twelfth, the military regime of Chun Doo-hwan enacted additional restrictions over the media. In 1980, Chun forced the merger of all 29 private broadcasters into the state-owned Korean Broadcasting System (KBS) and Munhwa Broadcasting Corporation (MBC), creating a state-led media monopoly.

As a part of the decolonization process in South Korea, imports of all Japanese media were banned in 1945. Despite this ban, Japanese media was still widely distributed and pirated in South Korea, with both state broadcasters and individual bootleggers being found guilty of illegal importation. The signing of the Japan–South Korea Joint Declaration of 1998 marked the end of the ban, which was gradually lifted in four stages between 1998 and 2004. To support the South Korean cultural industry, the South Korean Ministry of Culture, Sports and Tourism received a substantial budget increase, allowing for the creation of hundreds of culture industry departments in universities nationwide. The ministry justified its financial support for hallyu by linking it to South Korea's export-driven economy, and in 2012 estimated its economic value at US$83.2 billion.

== First generation ==
The first generation of the Korean Wave, also called hallyu 1.0, was the initial rise in popularity of Korean popular culture within nearby Asian countries. The first generation began in China during the late 1990s, and consisted primarily of the spread of Korean television programming.

=== Television in the first generation ===
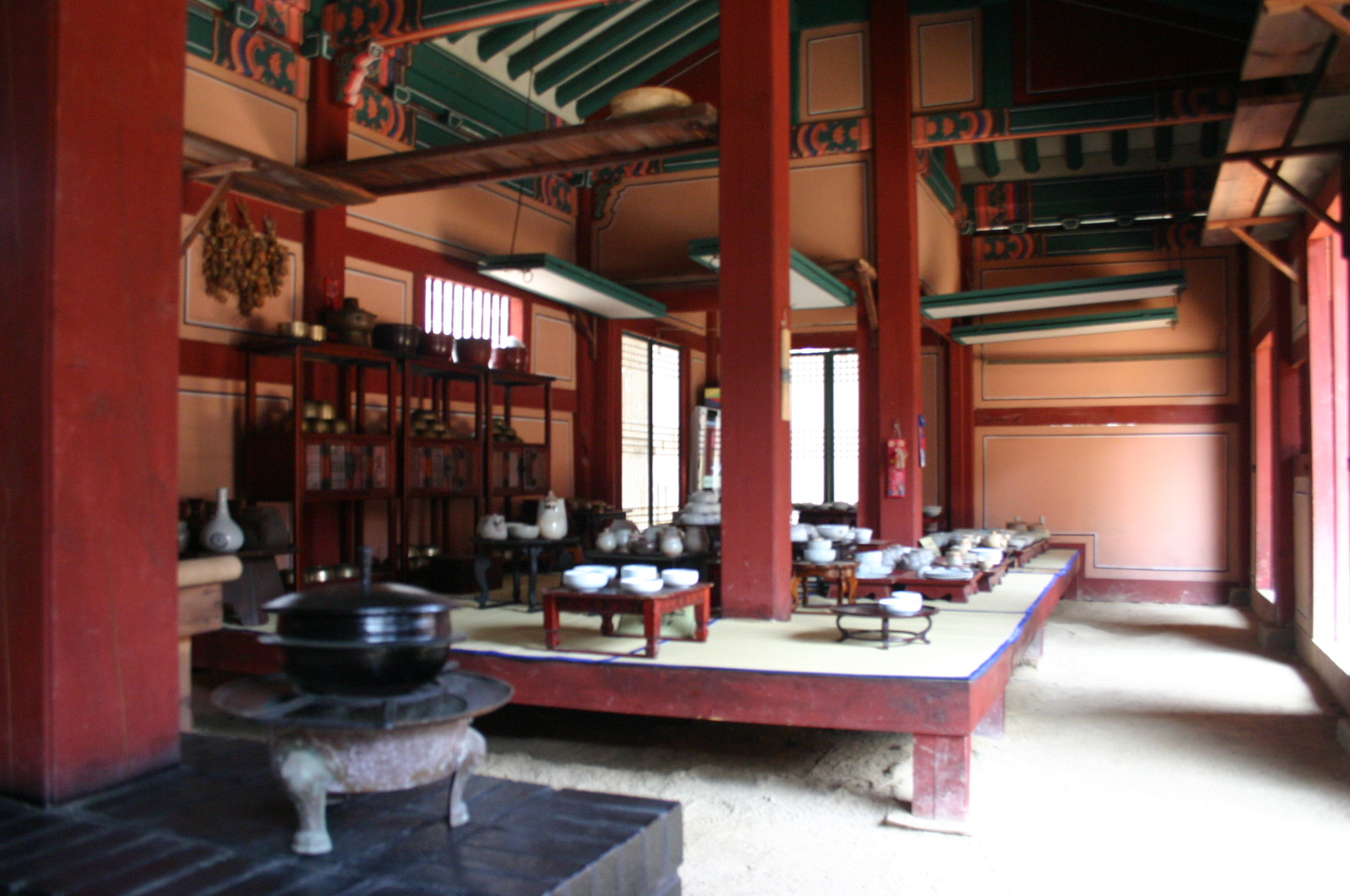
The filming location of Jewel in the Palace at Dae Jang Geum Theme Park

In 1990, the National Assembly granted a broadcasting license to the regional Seoul Broadcasting System (SBS), becoming the first private television station since the forced nationalization of private broadcasters in 1980. In December 1991, the National Assembly passed the Cable Television Act which directed the Ministry of Information to provide permits to twenty prospective cable television program providers. The providers were selected in August 1993, and cable television services began in March, 1995. With the liberalization of the South Korean television market, a greater number of Korean programs started to be exported abroad. These media exports were first exported to China, after the two countries formally established diplomatic relations in 1992. Although Jealousy (1992) was the first K-drama broadcast on China Central Television (CCTV), the 1997 broadcasts of the K-drama First Love and Star in My Heart in China are generally considered the start of the Korean Wave. Compounding the foreign interest in Korean television programs, countries throughout East Asia began opening their television markets to foreign countries in the 1980s and 1990s. In the early 1970s, imported television programs made up less than 1 percent of all airtime on CCTV, while by the late 1990s, that number would rise to 20–30 percent. In Vietnam, Korean television made up more than half of all imported programming in 1988.

The 1997 Asian financial crisis led broadcasters throughout East Asia to seek cheaper programs as an alternative to the expensive, but popular broadcasts from Japan. In 2000, K-dramas were a quarter of the price of Japanese television programs and a tenth of the price of Hong Kong television programs. K-dramas first entered the Taiwanese market during the early 1990s, but the shift to Korean television programming following the financial crisis and the successful airing of Fireworks (2000) and Autumn in My Heart (2000) marked the start of the Korean Wave in the country.

The 2003 historical K-drama Jewel in the Palace has been credited for having the greatest impact on the popularity of Korean television programs in Chinese-speaking countries, including Taiwan, Hong Kong, Singapore, and China. In May 2005, the show's final episode became the highest-rated television episode in Hong Kong history at more than 40 percent. In the years following its release, the program was exported to over 80 countries around the world. At the same time, the 2003–2004 airing of the romance K-drama Winter Sonata in Japan marked the entrance of the Korean Wave to Japan. Winter Sonata achieved a cult following in Japan among women in their 30s, particularly around the show's lead actor Bae Yong-joon. This would lead Prime Minister Junichiro Koizumi to exclaim in 2004 that "Bae Yong-joon is more popular than I am in Japan." Following the broadcast, stereotypes of Korea in Japan changed dramatically and tourism from Japan to South Korea would spike, primarily among Japanese women.

In the Indian state of Manipur, Hindi-language movies and television channels were banned in 2000 by insurgents, leading broadcasters to use Korean programming as substitutes. Korean dramas and films were also commonly smuggled into the region in the form of CDs and DVDs.

By the late 2000s, K-dramas became part of the daily programming of local television channels across East Asia and in China, Korean programs made up more than all other foreign programming combined. During the period between 1997 and 2007, television exports from South Korea would increase from $8.3 million to $151 million, mostly to other Asian markets. As the volume of Korean cultural imports rapidly increased, China's State Administration of Radio, Film, and Television responded with a decision to restrict and limit the number of Korean TV dramas shown to Chinese audiences. In Taiwan, the National Communications Commission asked cable channels to reduce the number of prime time hours allocated to Korean programming. In addition, in response to the popularity of Jewel in the Palace, director Zhang Guoli and actor Jackie Chan both called on domestic audiences to "resist Korean Wave".

=== Film in the first generation ===
In 1966, military dictator Park Chung Hee established screen quotas that restricted the number of foreign films shown in cinemas, intended to protect the Korean film industry from Hollywood blockbusters. However, in 1986, the Motion Pictures Exporters Association of America filed a complaint to the United States Senate regarding the restrictions imposed by the South Korean government. Under US pressure and despite fierce opposition from the domestic film industry, in 1988, the Korean government lifted restrictions that required foreign films to be distributed by domestic companies. In 1988, 20th Century Fox became the first American film studio to set up a distribution office in South Korea, followed by Warner Brothers in 1989, Columbia in 1990, and Disney in 1993. By 1994, domestic films reached a record low market share of just 15.4 percent, with commentators predicting the demise of the Korean film industry in the near-future. As well, negotiations for the Uruguay Round Agreements Act concluded in 1994, requiring South Korea to liberalize its communications and culture markets.

In response to these crises, the National Assembly instituted the Cultural Industry Bureau within the Ministry of Culture and Sports and passed the Motion Picture Promotion Law in 1995, providing tax incentives for film production. These incentives were successful in attracting a number of chaebols to the film industry, but these ventures were financially unsuccessful, and most disbanded following the 1997 Asian financial crisis. In January 1999, the Samsung Entertainment Group announced its dissolution and released its final film Shiri in February of that year. But despite the withdrawal of Samsung from the industry, Shiri set box office records in South Korea and achieved commercial success in Hong Kong and Japan, a rare feat for the time. Shiri had been funded partly through venture capital, and the success of the film led to a 1999 revision of the Motion Picture Promotion Law to allow individuals to finance film productions. This influx of capital would fund hundreds of Korean films and dramatically increase their budgets, with average costs per production rising from 0.9 billion won in 1995 to 42 billion won in 2004. The 2001 film My Sassy Girl achieved box office success in Hong Kong and Japan, and was the subject of multiple foreign remakes.

=== Music in the first generation ===
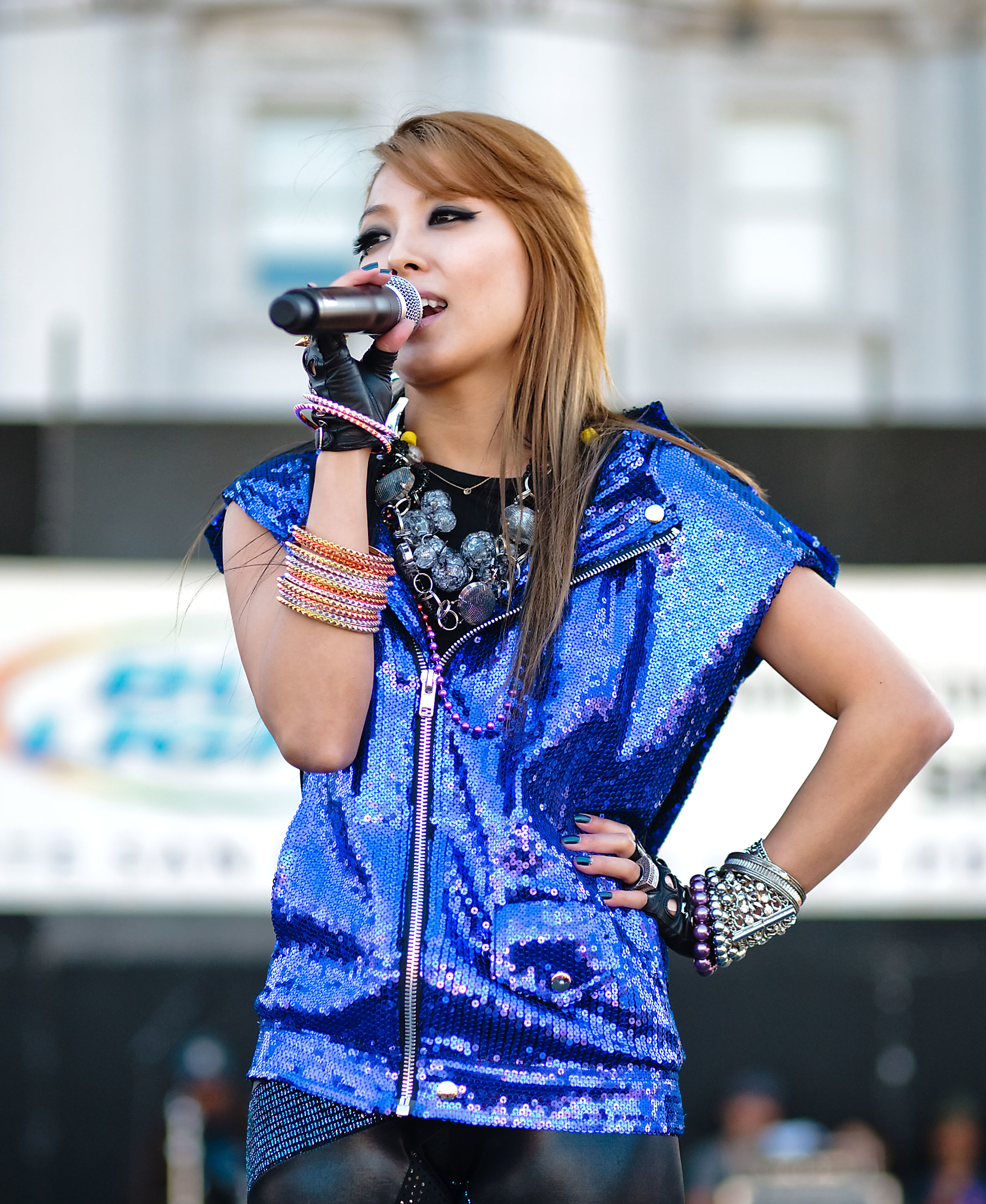
BoA performing at San Francisco Pride in June 2009

Prior to the mid-1990s, South Korean music was largely devoid of foreign interest. While SK, Daewoo, and Samsung had expanded into the South Korean music industry during the mid-1990s, under similar circumstances to the South Korean film industry, the 1997 Asian financial crisis abruptly ended these ventures. This vacuum was filled by SM Entertainment (founded by Lee Soo-man in 1995), YG Entertainment (founded by Yang Hyun-seok of Seo Taiji and Boys in 1996), and JYP Entertainment (founded by R&B singer Park Jin-young in 1997). K-pop first gained popularity in China after the 1997 radio program Seoul Music Room began broadcasting in Beijing.

The debuts of BoA in 2000, Rain in 2002, TVXQ in 2003, Super Junior in 2005, BigBang in 2006, and Wonder Girls and Girls' Generation in 2007 were major breakthroughs for K-pop in Asia. BoA became the first South Korean pop star to break into the Japanese market with the release of her album Listen to My Heart (2002), following the fall of barriers that had restricted the import and export of entertainment between the countries since the end of World War II. During the 2008 fiscal year, 68 percent of all K-pop exports from South Korea were exported to Japan.

== Second generation ==
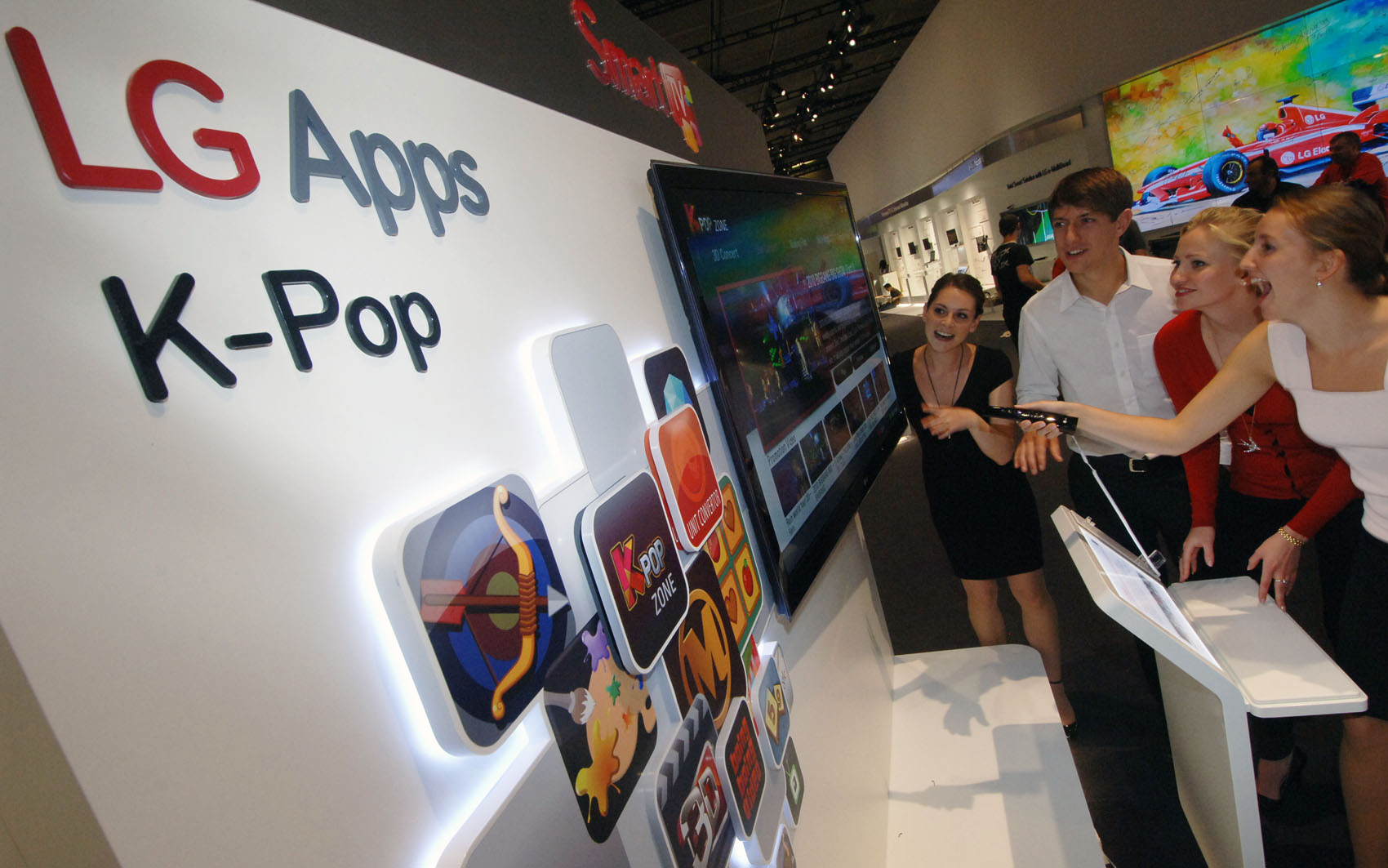
K-pop songs being played by the South Korean conglomerate LG at the IFA trade exhibition in Germany in 2011

Hallyu 2.0 or the New Korean Wave refers to the second generation of the Korean Wave, beginning in 2008. This generation is characterized by the spread of Korean popular culture through social media and the transition to K-pop as the primary South Korean cultural export. The period marked the rapid expansion of the South Korean music, animation, and online gaming industries and a shift in government policy, from indifference to enthusiastic support, under the Lee Myung-bak and Park Geun-hye administrations. The mid-2000s marked the expansion of the Korean Wave outside of East Asia into other parts of Asia, while the mid-2010s marked the Korean Wave's expansion outside of Asia into Europe, the Americas, and Africa. During this period, social media and platforms like YouTube, Netflix, Disney, and Webtoon played a key role in the dissemination of South Korean popular culture.

Since the mid-2010s, the rising success of K-pop groups abroad have become characteristic of the Korean Wave. These successes were led by the meteoric rise of the music video for Psy's "Gangnam Style". According to a poll conducted by the Ministry of Culture, Sports and Tourism during the COVID-19 pandemic, Crash Landing on You, It's Okay to Not Be Okay, and The World of the Married were the three most popular television programs internationally. In the United States, the Korean Wave spread outwards from Korean-American communities, most notably in New York City and Los Angeles.

Since September 2022, the Victoria and Albert Museum has hosted the exhibition "Hallyu! The Korean Wave", showcasing the history of the Korean Wave in fashion, music, dance, and art. Following its success in London, the exhibition travelled internationally, opening at the Museum of Fine Arts in Boston, then moving to the Asian Art Museum in San Francisco, the Museum Rietberg in Zurich, and the National Museum of Australia in Canberra. Across these venues, the exhibition received strong critical acclaim, praised for its dynamic storytelling, immersive design, and nuanced exploration of Korea's cultural influence on the world. Min Jin Lee, the author of the novel Pachinko, credited the Korean Wave for her success.

=== Government policy ===
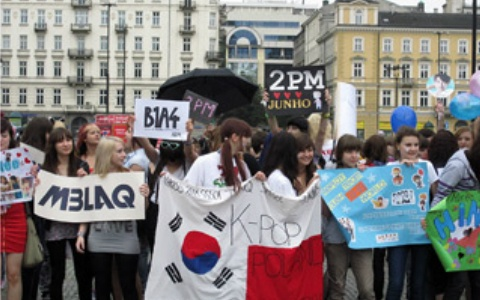
K-pop fans outside the Korean Cultural Center in Warsaw holding up a South Korean-Polish flag, as well as banners for Korean boybands MBLAQ, B1A4, and 2PM in 2011

The success of South Korean cultural products in Asia has led some governments to pass measures to protect their own cultural industries. China made specific efforts to stem the flow of Korean films and dramas into their countries, hurting their sales. This motivated the South Korean cultural industry to break into markets outside of Asia.

Prior to the 1990s, the Korean government prioritized funding traditional forms of Korean culture over contemporary Korean pop culture. However, in 1993 the government shifted to a policy of cultural commercialization, incorporating cultural products as economic exports. In 1999, the National Assembly passed the Basic Law for Promoting Cultural Industries which provided government support for Korean cultural products. The South Korean government promoted hallyu to increase its cultural soft power.

=== The Internet ===
Since the 2000s, the Korean Wave has transformed from a phenomenon driven primarily by satellite broadcasts to one driven by social media and the Internet. Foreign-language subtitles of K-dramas and real-time translations of K-pop performances on the Internet broadened the scope of Korean pop culture. YouTube has enabled fans to connect with K-pop through their own content, such as dance covers and reaction videos/channels. The creation of remakes on YouTube acted as consumer-generated advertising and helped propel the virality of "Gangnam Style".

=== Music in the second generation ===
YouTube and other online video platforms played an important role in expanding the international popularity K-pop. Asia Today, reported that global attention began in the late 2000s with groups such as Wonder Girls, followed by artists like BigBang, 2NE1, BTS, and Blackpink who went on to break multiple Billboard records, "one after another". K-pop gained further visibility in 2012 when Psy's "Gangnam Style" became the first YouTube video to reach one billion views in December of that year, marking a major turning point for Korean music abroad.

Twice performing at Allegiant Stadium in Las Vegas during their Ready to Be World Tour in 2024

In the 2010s and 2020s, groups such as BTS and Twice continued to achieve worldwide success through global tours, appearances at major award shows, and other foreign events. BTS won twelve Billboard Music Awards, eleven American Music Awards, and received five nominations at the Grammy Awards. BTS sold out four concerts at SoFi Stadium in Los Angeles in 2021. Twice became the first K-pop girl group to headline sold-out concerts at SoFi Stadium and MetLife Stadium in 2023. Blackpink's Born Pink World Tour in 2022–23 became the highest-grossing tour by an Asian act in history, and the group was the first Asian act to headline Coachella in 2023. Blackpink member Rosé earned three Grammy Award nominations and became the first K-pop act to be nominated in a Big Four category as a lead artist. Twice's This Is For World Tour in 2026 set the record for the highest overall attendance achieved by a K-pop girl group in North America, with 550,000 spectators.

Collaborations between Korean and international artists increased during this period, including BTS with Steve Aoki, Psy with Snoop Dogg, and Rosé with Bruno Mars. As K-pop's global reach expanded, success abroad no longer depended on domestic popularity, and international audiences became the largest consumers of the genre.

In today's world, K-pop continues to thrive through short-form content, TikTok challenges, and global fan engagement platforms that let fans participate in real-time streaming, voting, and album promotions. These digital tools, along with emerging technologies like virtual performances and AI-generated remixes, have helped K-pop remain influential in today's global music landscape.

=== Television in the second generation ===
Since the mid-2000s, the three major South Korean broadcast television networks, KBS, MBC, and SBS, have faced increasing competition from comprehensive television networks with integrated production teams. The second generation of the Korean Wave produced a number of innovative television programs, including the absurd romantic comedy My Love from the Star, the reality variety show Running Man, the live audition programs like Superstar K.

The 2006 historical K-drama Jumong was hugely successful in Turkey, Romania, and Iran, where it achieved nationwide ratings of 80 to 90 percent. The 2019 K-drama Kingdom was highly successful in India. During the COVID-19 pandemic in India, streaming services in India saw a dramatic rise in interest for Korean-language programming. Korean Wave also has had a significant impact on Pakistan, particularly among the youth during the COVID era.

=== Film in the second generation ===
During the first generation of the Korean Wave, Korean films that were exported abroad were primarily consumed in other Asian countries. Through online streaming services like Netflix, the South Korean entertainment industry has been able to expand outside of East Asia. The 2019 black comedy thriller film Parasite won several awards at international film festivals, including Academy Awards for Best International Film, Best Director, Best Original Screenplay, and — marking the first win in the category for a non-English-language film — Best Picture.

According to PlumResearch data presented by Omdia, in the first quarter of 2023 locally produced Korean Netflix originals accounted for nearly 68% of all hours watched for the platform's original titles in South Korea. In 2025, the American animated movie KPop Demon Hunters became the most viewed movie on Netflix and a summer pop-culture hit.

=== Manhwa ===
Manhwa, the Korean term for comics, first gained popularity outside of Korea during the early 2000s when manhwa were first became available on the Internet. The term "manhwa" is derived from the Korean word "manhwa" (만화), which can be translated to "comics" or "cartoons". It encompasses a wide range of genres and styles, similar to its Japanese counterpart, manga. During the 2010s, the format would undergo a revitalization as a result of webtoons, which provided the medium a smartphone-optimized layout and room to skirt South Korea's censorship standards. Modern Manhwa has extended its reach to many other countries. Korean companies like Naver, Kakao, and Lezhin that host webtoons have expanded globally and have begun to offer their titles in different languages. These comics have branched outside of Korea by access of Webtoons and have created an impact that has resulted in some movie and television show adaptations.

The Korean Manhwa industry has undergone significant changes from 1910 to the present, facing various challenges along the way. In the early years, the impact of Japanese colonial rule and the aftermath of the Korean War led to heavy government intervention from the 1950s to the 1970s. This intervention, driven by concerns for political stability, resulted in censorship and negative societal views, limiting the industry's growth during that period. Fast forward to the 2000s-2010s, a notable shift occurred with the rise of webtoons and educational manhwa. Webtoons, thriving on digitization and online platforms, gained international acclaim. Educational manhwa also played a positive role in children's education, reducing business risks and reshaping the industry.

Globalization and digitization further boosted success, allowing Korean animation series and webtoons to capture diverse audiences worldwide. The need for a business-friendly environment with less government intervention, coupled with a shift in societal perceptions to recognize manhwa as a dynamic and creative industry was the key to this change. Recognizing historical challenges was crucial for crafting effective policies to propel the Korean manhwa industry into a vibrant and globally competitive landscape.

== Popularity and impact ==
=== Sociocultural ===
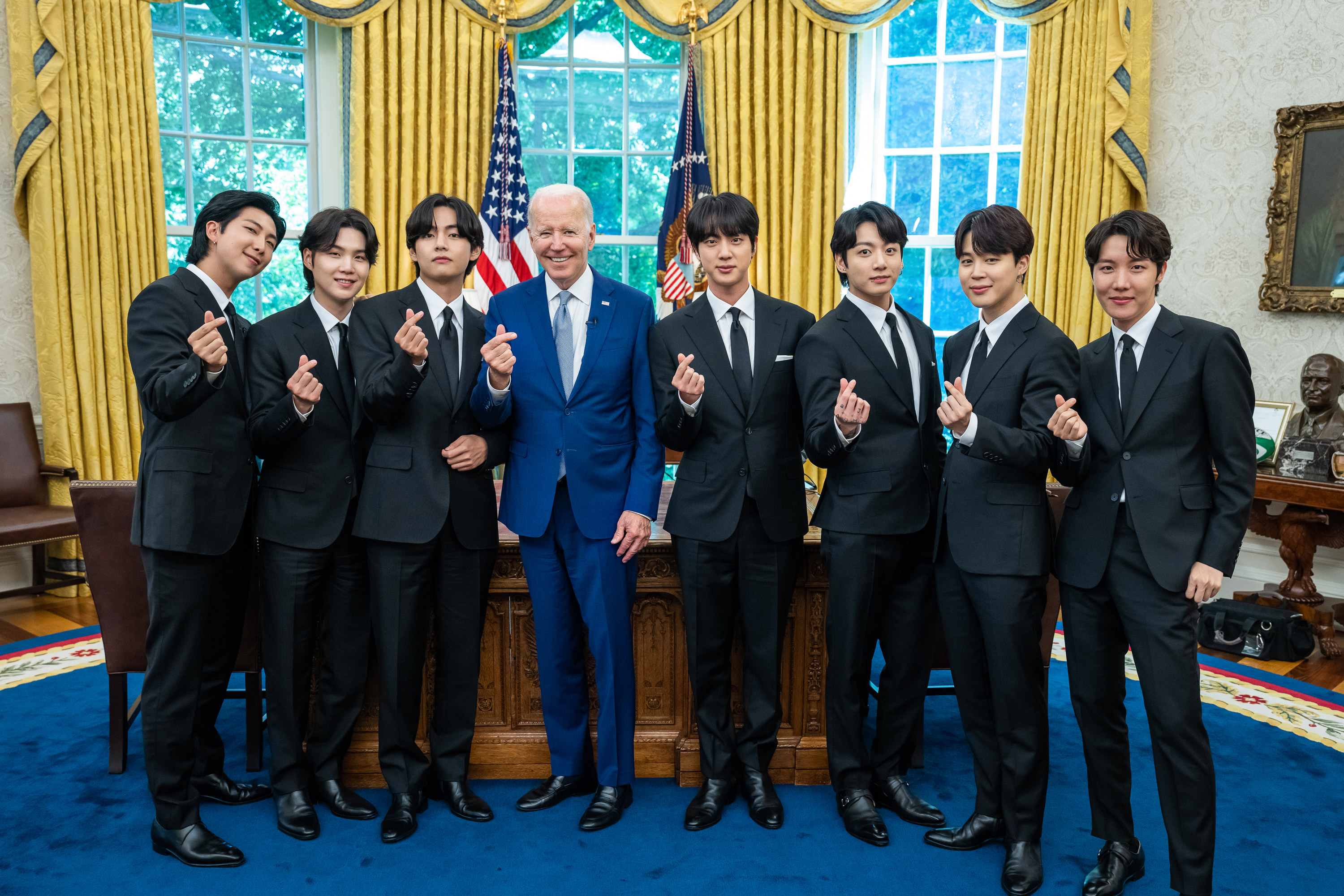
BTS and US President Joe Biden at the White House in 2022

Korean pop culture is very popular in Taiwan, and an increasing number of Taiwanese are learning the Korean language. The United States Modern Language Association reported that the number of university students learning Korean nearly doubled between 2006 and 2016, the largest increase of any language with over 1,000 enrollments. In 2020, Korean became the fastest growing foreign language in Mexico and United States. The South Korean Ministry of Education attributed this rise in interest in the Korean language as a product of the Korean Wave. The Korean Wave has influenced a large number of British university students to pursue Korean language degrees.

In India, millennials and members of Generation Z are the most interested in the Korean Wave. On May 31, 2022, BTS visited US President Joe Biden at the White House to discuss the rise in anti-Asian hate crimes.

According to the 2026 Overseas Hallyu Survey, 69.7% of respondents who had experienced Korean cultural content expressed a favorable view of it. The survey covered 27,400 people across 30 regions worldwide.

=== Impact in Canada ===
==== Impact on Asian-Canadians ====
A 2016 article was published on the Korean Wave's effect on Asian Canadians, and how they interact with it through social media. Ranging from Korean ethnic youth to Chinese, Taiwanese, Malay, and Japanese youths, through a series of interviews in two Canadian cities. The study found that the Korean Wave, specifically K-pop, allows Asian diasporic audiences to settle the differences between tradition and modernity. The Korean youth in this study used K-pop to connect to their homeland. Participants in the study also mainly engaged with others of Asian descent, in a form of racial affinity.

In a 2017 article by the same author, on the topic of cultural translation of K-pop among the same demographic (Asian-Canadians), it was found that they used K-pop to positively re-affirm their race and challenge Asian stereotypes, even if they weren't specifically Korean. This is another case of racial affinity, where the Korean content allows them to look back on their identity as a member of the Asian community.

In the most recent study by the same author in 2022, a book was released about the Korean Wave in Korean Canadian youth culture, and not the generalized Asian youth. Diasporic Korean Canadian youth played a role as early proselytizers of Hallyu, spreading it transnationally. Involvement of Korean Canadian youth in the K-pop scene has reinforced trans-Pacific connections and genre hybridization. Finding ethnic identification through Hallyu, it influences how Korean Canadians interact with Korea, as well as being a source of cultural information for Korean-Canadians who haven't been there or haven't had many chances to visit, through vlogs, Korean TV like Running Man, K-dramas and K-pop.

In a case study published in 2023, consisting of both qualitative and quantitative research done through a questionnaire survey with 240 participants focusing on 1st, 1.5 and 2nd generation Korean-Canadians, and through Zoom, using Life History Interviewing across 10 participants that were 1.5 generation Korean-Canadians. On findings relevant to the Korean Wave consistent with previous studies mentioned, it was found that Korean pop culture (K-pop, K-dramas, entertainment shows, etc.) have a positive effect on Korean-Canadians and their identity exploration. It provides precious information on culture in Korea, which can aid them in exploring social ties with their families and ethnic community. Korean pop culture can also enhance interest and motivation to explore a Korean identity, instead of just a Canadian one.

==== Impact on Canadian Communities ====
In Canada, universities like University of Toronto are seeing a big spike in enrolment for Korean language courses, leading to long waitlists. A University of Toronto professor attributes the change to K-pop leading to interests in other aspects of the Hallyu Wave, then a general interest in Korean culture.

Several K-pop dance groups have been started in Canada due to motivation from the Korean Wave, like Apricity, Convergence, Daebak, Mimyu, and Encöre Dance Crew. Small communities have also been fostered by the Korean Wave, like the establishment of YEGKpop in Edmonton.

BGM Dance Studio in Vancouver was started by a 1st generation K-pop fan. In a radio interview, the director of the studio commented on the growth in Vancouver in K-pop, from 1 to 2 active K-pop dance groups in 2013 to now 10+ K-pop dance cover groups. Most students in the studio are interested in just dancing together, but there's certain students like previous BGM student Brian Ho of Ampers&One that want to be K-pop stars. Korean entertainment companies like Modhaus, FNC and YG use BGM as a site for offline auditions.

The Korean Cultural Center of Ottawa holds courses under the name of K-Academy for anyone interested, starting in 2019. Han Lee, the PR manager for the Korean Cultural Centre Canada (KCCC) says that due to the popularity of K-pop, especially during the COVID lockdown, many Canadians now participate in the events and courses held by the Korean Cultural Centre Canada (KCCC). As well as Korean-Canadian families with children who want to learn more about their heritage visiting the center.

==== Korean-Canadians in the Hallyu Wave ====
There are several Korean-Canadians who take part in the Korean Wave like Mark of NCT, Jeon Somi, Seok Matthew of Zerobaseone, Jacob Bae and Kevin Moon of The Boyz, Keeho of P1Harmony, Junny and Yechan of 82Major. Keeho auditioned for FNC Entertainment. Junny from Vancouver started on Soundcloud and sold a song of his to a former member of Exo. He was later invited by SM Entertainment to a songwriting camp and started working for the company as a songwriter.

KPop Demon Hunters, an animated film by Sony, was made by Korean-Canadian Maggie Kang, who was born in Seoul and grew up in Toronto.

=== Economic ===
In 2004, KBS sold its K-drama Spring Waltz to eight Asian countries during its pre-production stage two years before its release.

The Korean Wave popularized Korean snacks in Kazakhstan, Pakistan, China, Vietnam, Russia, India, and the United States. The Korean Wave has resulted in the rise in popularity of Korean ramyeon overseas, with the noodles being prominently featured in K-dramas and films. Product placement, a common feature of K-dramas, has fueled interest in India into a variety of brands featured on these shows. Korean fashion, music, and television have been adopted by teenagers in Kashmir, despite concerns by older generations over the erasure of traditional Kashmiri culture.

=== Relations with North Korea ===
Per the Law on Rejecting Reactionary Ideology and Culture, effective since 2020, consuming, possessing or distributing South Korean products is illegal in North Korea, with penalties ranging from forced labour to prison camp to execution. In North Korea, the Korean Wave is called the nam-Joseon baram (Korean: 남조선 바람; lit. 'South Joseon wind'). In June 2007, the film Hwang Jin Yi, adapted from a novel by a North Korean author, became the first South Korean production to be made available for public viewing in North Korea.

A 2010 survey of 33 North Korean defectors by the Korea Institute for National Unification found that shows like Winter Sonata played a significant role in shaping the decision of the defectors to flee to the South. The institute also stated that some North Koreans near the Korean Demilitarized Zone reportedly tampered with their televisions to receive signals from South Korean stations, while on the northern border, CDs and DVDs were commonly smuggled in from China. A 2012 survey by the institute of 100 North Korean defectors reported that South Korean media was prevalent among the North Korean elite. It also re-affirmed that North Koreans living near the northern border had the highest degree of access to South Korean entertainment. Notels, a type of Chinese portable media player introduced to North Korea in 2005, have been credited for proliferating Korean media in the North.

In October 2012, Supreme Leader Kim Jong Un gave a speech to the Korean People's Army in which he vowed to "extend the fight against the enemy's ideological and cultural infiltration." A US State Department-commissioned study earlier that year concluded that North Korea was "increasingly anxious" to restrict the flow of information, but were struggling to contain the "substantial demand" for South Korean movies and television programs and the "intensely entrepreneurial" smugglers on the Chinese side of the border.

... My happiest moments when I was in North Korea were watching [South] Korean TV shows. I felt like I was living in that same world [as those actors on the show] ...
—A North Korean defector interviewed by Human Rights Watch

On 15 May 2013, the NGO Human Rights Watch found that "entertainment shows from South Korea are particularly popular and have served to undermine the North Korean government's negative portrayals of South Korea".

In 2020, North Korea passed the Law on Rejecting Reactionary Ideology and Culture, which imposes penalty ranging from forced labor to death for those that want to keep or distribute cultural materials, such as TV programs, books and songs from "hostile countries," including as South Korea.

In 2021, Kim Jong Un called K-pop a vicious cancer that serves to undermine the North Korean government. Kim further warned that South Korean entertainment was having a grave influence on young North Koreans and emphasized the necessity of stamping out "capitalist tendencies". In a leaked document obtained by Asia Press, Kim Jong Un deemed North Korean women who call their date oppa or "yobo" instead of comrade "perverted". The documents warned that those who were caught using the language would be expelled from their city. In 2023, North Korea passed the Pyongyang Cultural Language Protection Act, which criminalizes the use of South Korean-style language and expressions by North Koreans, including using oppa to refer to non-relatives, with a maximum penalty of death.

=== Other political impacts ===
K-dramas including Jewel in the Palace and Descendants of the Sun promote nationalistic themes. South Korean media discourses celebrating K-Pop reinforce nationalism among the domestic audience. South Korean researchers originated the term "pop nationalism" to analyze hallyu within nationalistic discourses and interests.

== Tourism ==
The airing of drama Winter Sonata in Japan led to a rise in tourism to South Korea and dramatically shifted the demographics of Japanese tourism to South Korea, from primarily Japanese men on kisaeng tours to young Japanese women. South Korea's tourism industry has been greatly influenced by the increasing popularity of its media. According to Korean Culture and Information Service (Kocis), yearly tourism figures have increased from 5.32 million visitors in 2000 to 11.03 million visitors in 2023.

The Korean Tourism Organization has recognized the Korean Wave as a significant pull factor for tourists, and launched a tourism campaign in 2014 entitled "Imagine your Korea" that highlighted Korean entertainment. Many fans of Korean television dramas are also motivated to travel to Korea, frequently visiting filming locations like Nami Island, featured in Winter Sonata, and Dae Jang Geum Theme Park. The majority of these tourists were women. According to the KTO, more than 100,000 Indians traveled to South Korea in 2018, with the number of Indian tourists rising steadily each year.

=== Impact of hallyu on South Korean tourism ===
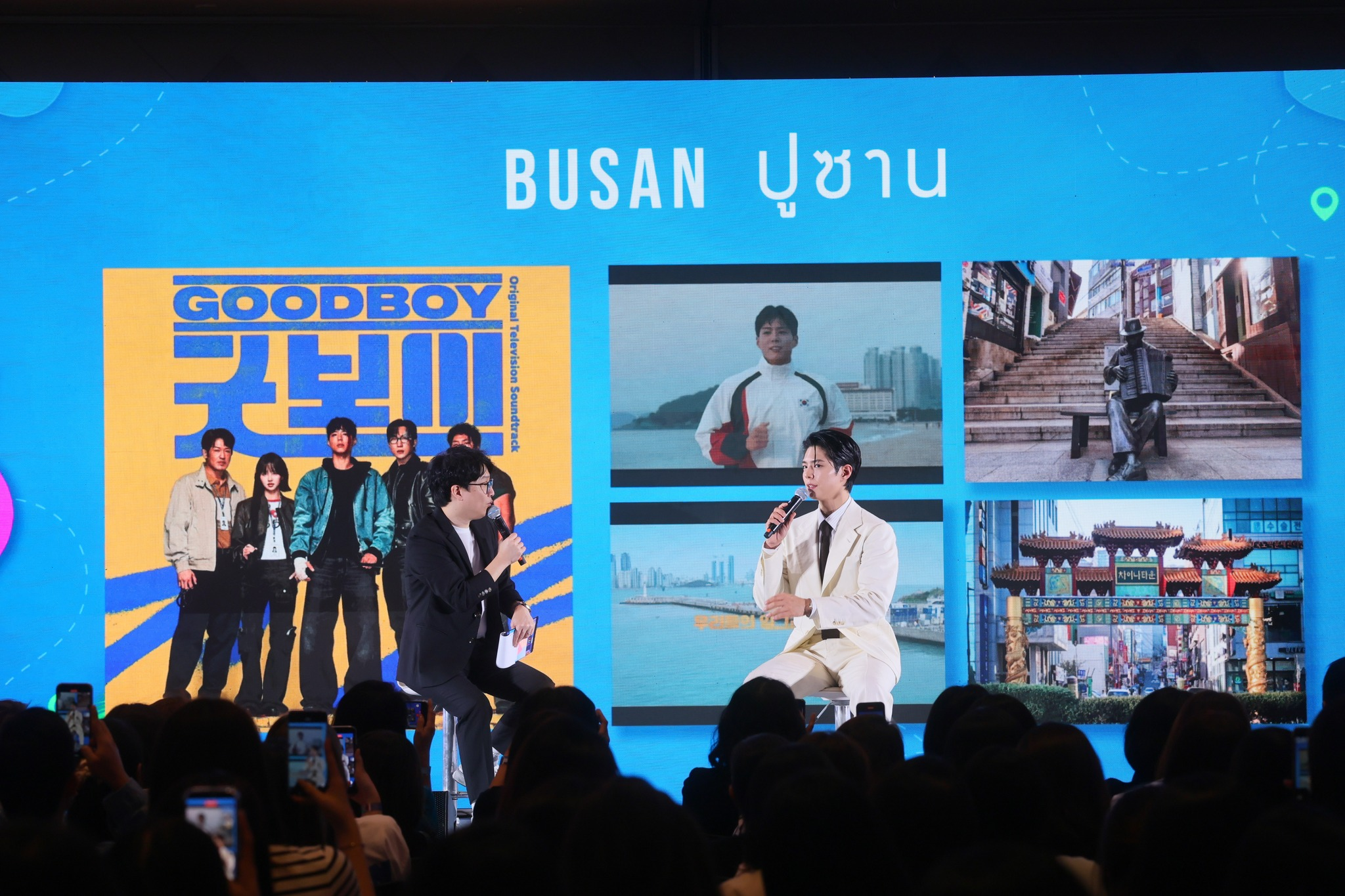
Actor and honorary ambassador of South Korean tourism Park Bo-gum (center) discussing filming locations of his K-drama Good Boy at the 2026 Thai International Travel Fair in Bangkok

The Korean Wave has significantly influenced the global popularity of South Korean culture, particularly through K-dramas and K-pop, driving increased tourism in the country. The strategic initiatives implemented by the government and tourism industry have capitalized on this trend to enhance the country's economic landscape and cultural diplomacy on the global stage. Hallyu-related sectors such as cosmetics, fashion, tourism, and education have seen substantial economic contributions, with cultural exports contributing to a 0.2% increase in South Korea's GDP in 2004, escalating remarkably to $12.3 billion by 2019. These figures underscore the profound impact of the Korean Wave on the economy, largely driven by tourism. This growth is supported by a study showing a robust correlation coefficient of 0.89 for hallyu products, significantly higher than 0.44 for non-hallyu products, indicating the strong economic influence of cultural exports.

Recognizing the global appeal of hallyu, the government launched the "Visit Korea Year 2023–2024". This initiative features a series of events and promotions to attract tourists, including K-pop concerts, cultural festivals, and significant discounts on travel and accommodations. The Korea Tourism Organization (KTO) also hosts international roadshows and eco-friendly activities to promote cultural and environmental awareness. Singer and actor Cha Eun-woo was appointed honorary ambassador for "Visit Korea Year 2023–2024". The Korea Tourism Organization selected him expecting that his positive influence as a Hallyu star would boost global interest in visiting Korea, especially among the MZ generation. Digital technologies also play a crucial role in tourism strategies. Live streaming, for example, has emerged as a strategic tool, significantly influencing viewer engagement through parasocial interactions, where viewers feel a sense of friendship and trust with streamers. This enhances viewer loyalty and encourages more visits, illustrating the shift towards digital engagement in tourism marketing.

The Ministry of Culture, Sports and Tourism together with the Korea Tourism Organization appoints globally-known South Korean figures as honorary ambassadors for their campaigns. They have included boy group BTS, actor Lee Jung-jae, and girl group NewJeans, and actor Park Bo-gum.

== Foreign relations ==
During a press conference with South Korean President Park Geun-hye in May 2013, US President Barack Obama remarked that the Korean Wave was another result of the Miracle on the Han River.

The Korean Wave has been acknowledged by various heads of state and government, including Chinese paramount leader Hu Jintao and Premier Wen Jiabao, US President Barack Obama, Indian President Ram Nath Kovind, and Australian Prime Minister Julia Gillard. The phenomenon has also been acknowledged by UN Secretary-General Ban Ki-moon, the Japanese Ministry of Foreign Affairs, US Secretary of State John Kerry, Afghan Deputy Foreign Minister Meerwais Nab, New Zealand Deputy Secretary of Foreign Affairs and Trade Andrea Smith, the French Ministry for Europe and Foreign Affairs, the German Federal Foreign Office, and UK Foreign Office Minister Hugo Swire. A 2018–2019 survey conducted by the Korean Culture and Information Service found that the Korean Wave was a key factor in global perceptions of South Korea.

=== Taiwan ===
The Korean Wave positively impacted perceptions of South Korea in Taiwan. Taiwanese people's favorable impression of South Korea continues to increase significantly, which also makes the relationship between South Korea and Taiwan very close.

=== India ===
Korean culture has become increasingly popular in India, particularly in the northeast, where people feel somewhat alienated from the rest of India and have some similarities to Koreans. Hallyu began to impact Indian pop culture trends around the beginning of the COVID-19 pandemic, according to the Korea Institute for International Economic Policy. The amount of hallyu content has increased for nearly all content types when compared to pre-pandemic times. The majority of consumers are young females. India and Korea have hosted cultural events at each other's embassies, with their leaders looking to increase cultural ties.

=== Japan ===
The Korean Wave began to gain traction in Japan around the late 1990s and early 2000s. This initial surge was largely due to efforts by Japanese Prime Minister Obuchi Keizo and Korean President Kim Dae-jung, who aimed to foster a "future-oriented relationship" between the two countries. As part of this initiative, South Korea lifted its unilateral restrictions on the import of Japanese cultural products in 1998, leading to increased cultural exchanges between the two nations. A relevant policy, the Open Door Policy implemented by South Korea from 1998 to 2004, played a significant role in facilitating the spread of hallyu in Japan. This policy aimed to liberalize South Korea's cultural industry and promote cultural exports. On November 2, 2021, data released by KOCCA, underscores a remarkable surge in the export of Korean video content to Japan. In 2021, the export value soared to $1.81 billion (approximately 2.46 trillion won), representing a substantial 50 percent increase from the previous year's figure of $1.21 billion (approximately 1.64 trillion won). This significant growth reflects the escalating popularity and demand for Korean video content within the Japanese market.

=== China ===
The Korean Wave initially found a receptive audience in China, and by the late 2000s and early 2010s, China had become its largest market. Since 2016, China has implemented a hallyu ban on Korean cultural imports as retaliation for the installation of the THAAD missile defense system, which China considers a risk to its national security. In March 2017, the China National Tourism Administration issued a ban on group tours to South Korea by Chinese travel agencies. On 31 October 2017, following the two governments' announcement of a settlement regarding the THAAD dispute, China marginally eased its restrictions on Korean content, permitting limited online consumption while allowing travel agencies to resume group tours to South Korea.

=== Middle East and North Africa ===
Since the mid-2000s, Iran, Morocco and Egypt and Algeria have emerged as major consumers of Korean culture. Following the success of Korean dramas in the Middle East & North Africa, the Korean Overseas Information Service made Winter Sonata available with Arabic subtitles and the program was broadcast on several state-run Egyptian television networks. The Korean government's support for the Korean cultural exports in the Middle East are part of greater efforts to improve the country's image in the region.

The Middle East Broadcasting Channel (MBC4) played a major role in increasing the Korean Wave's popularity in the Middle East and North Africa. Beginning in 2012, MBC4 hosted a series of Korean dramas, including Boys Over Flowers, You're Beautiful, Dream High and Coffee Prince. The imports of these programs were sometimes criticized out of the fear they would lead to Islamic youth to abandon traditional values.

=== Egypt ===
Autumn in My Heart, one of the earliest Korean dramas brought over to the Middle East, was broadcast after five months of "persistent negotiations" between the South Korean embassy and an Egyptian state-run broadcasting company. Perceptions of South Korea in Egypt, which were undermined by the country's involvement in the Iraq War, were positively impacted following the screening of Autumn in My Heart in the country.

=== Iran ===
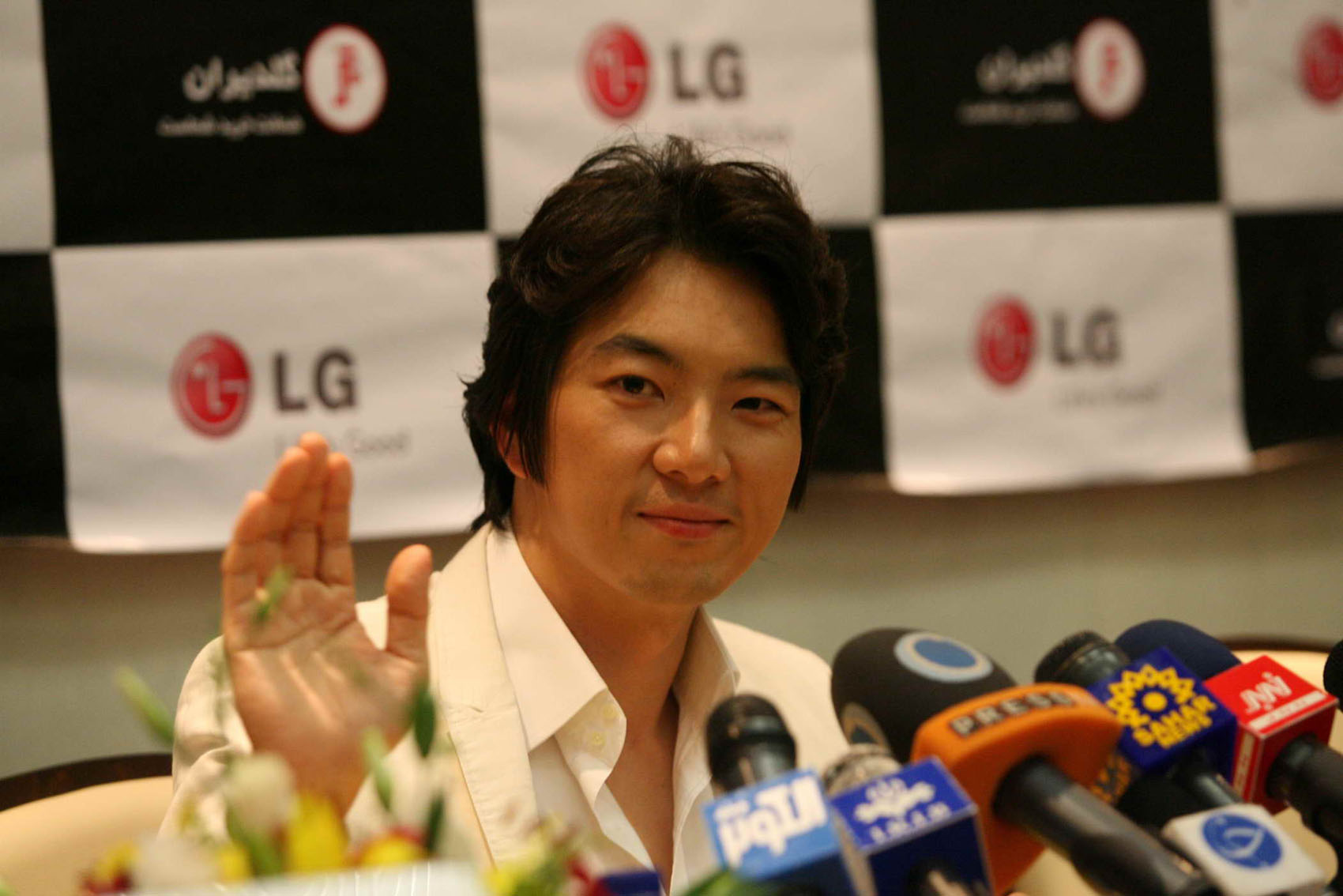
South Korean actor Song Il-gook at a press conference in Tehran on 18 August 2009

A number of K-dramas have been aired by Iran's state broadcaster, Islamic Republic of Iran Broadcasting (IRIB) in prime-time slots. Unlike Western productions, South Korean programs tend to satisfy the conservative criteria set by the Iranian Ministry of Culture and Islamic Guidance. In October 2012, representatives for the IRIB visited South Korea to visit filming locations in an effort to strengthen "cultural affinities" between the two countries and to seek avenues for further cooperation between KBS and IRIB.

=== Pakistan ===
The Korean Wave has gained popularity in Pakistan, especially among youth, through K-dramas, K-pop, and Korean beauty products. Cultural exchanges, such as K-pop competitions, film screenings, concerts organized by the South Korean embassy, have strengthened ties and sparked interest in the Korean language.

Notably, the K-pop Concert Night hosts by Korean embassy featuring the band Gaon was held at Al Hamra Art Center in Lahore on December 10, 2023, drawing significant attention from fans. In October 2025, the South Korean embassy hosted the K-Wave Festa: Beauty, Beats and Beyond. Park Jaelark, who is Charge d'Affaires of the Republic of Korea, emphasized in his opening speech the continues "efforts to strengthen cultural and people-to-people exchanges between Korea and Pakistan".

=== Israel and Palestine ===
Some commentators have hoped that the popularity of Korean culture across Israel and Palestine may serve as a bridge over the Israeli–Palestinian conflict. The Hebrew University of Jerusalem reported that some Israeli and Palestinian K-pop fans see themselves as "cultural missionaries" and actively introduce K-pop to their friends and relatives, further spreading the Korean Wave within their communities.

=== Australia ===
In Australia, the Korean Wave has spread through online media, fan networks and broadcasting, including SBS PopAsia, a nationally broadcast music television and radio programme that launched in 2011 and brought K-pop to a wider Australian audience. The Korean Wave has also intersected with bilateral cultural diplomacy. Sydney’s 2011 K-pop Music Festival coincided with the fiftieth anniversary of diplomatic relations between Australia and South Korea, and the Korean Cultural Centre Australia was established that year to promote cultural exchange and mutual understanding. Studies of Australian K-pop fans have linked engagement with K-pop to Korean language learning, travel to South Korea and wider interest in Korean culture.

== Criticism ==
In parts of China, the Korean Wave has been met with backlash and comparisons to cultural imperialism. In China, the Korean Wave has frequently been described as a "cultural invasion" and restrictions have limited the number of Korean TV dramas shown to Chinese audiences. At the Tai Ke Rock Concert in August 2005, a musician performed the racist and misogynistic rap "The Invasion of the Korean Wave" attacking actor Bae Yong-joon, female Taiwanese musicians, and the Korean Wave. In addition, backlash to K-pop is common on the internet, where it is criticized for superficiality, heteronomy, or vulgarity.

Backlash against the Korean Wave can be rooted in nationalism or historical conflicts. The K-pop industry has been criticized for its promotion of sexualized Asian stereotypes.

=== Mistreatment of artists ===
The South Korean entertainment industry has faced repeated claims of mistreatment towards its musical artists. A series of high-profile suicides by Korean actors and idols highlighted the industry's harsh working conditions.

=== Historical accuracy ===
Korean historical dramas have been increasingly scrutinized by Korean viewers for historical negationism and otherwise inaccurate portrayals of Korean history, leading to boycotts and the cancellation of shows such as Snowdrop and Joseon Exorcist.

=== Cultural and moral opposition ===
K-pop boy bands and their fans have been the targets of a variety of racist, misogynistic, and homophobic attacks purporting that the bands promote homosexuality and feminine men. In February 2021, Matthias Matuschik, a radio presenter for the German radio station Bayern 3, came under attack for declaring BTS were "some crappy virus that hopefully there will be a vaccine for soon." On 1 September 2021, a billboard of Jungkook from BTS was taken down in Pakistan after the billboard purportedly received complaints for promoting homosexuality and using the word ARMY, in conflict with the Pakistan Army. In November 2021, a group calling themselves "Team Copyright" based in Bangladesh took down a number of Twitter accounts associated with the BTS fandom through false copyright claims over allegations that the band promotes "atheism and homosexuality". K-pop and K-pop idols have been criticized for promoting unhealthy attitudes around weight in Indian adolescents.

=== Japan ===
Anti-Korean sentiment in Japan has sparked a number of far-right nationalist street protests demonstrating against the import of South Korean entertainment products. The anti-Korean comic, Manga Kenkanryu ("Hating the Korean Wave") was published on 26 July 2005 and was widely sold in Japan. According to a Korea Times article posted in February 2014, "Experts and observers in Korea and Japan say while attendance at the rallies is still small and such extreme actions are far from entering the mainstream of Japanese politics, the hostile demonstrations have grown in size and frequency in recent months."

== See also ==
- Miracle on the Han River
- Korean idol
- Tourism in South Korea
- Economy of South Korea
- Impact and popularity of K-pop
- Music of South Korea
  - Korean hip hop
  - Korean rock
  - Cultural technology
  - List of K-pop artists
  - List of South Korean idol groups
  - Traditional Korean musical instruments
  - Korean Cultural Center
  - Korean Culture and Information Service
  - Presidential Council on Nation Branding
- Korean literature
  - Literature Translation Institute of Korea
- Cinema of Korea
  - Hallyuwood
  - South Korean animation
- Korean dance
- List of Korean dramas associated with the Korean Wave
- Korean diaspora
- Korean studies
- Asian Century
- Guochao
- History of South Korea
