= Guochao =

Form of Chinese national pride

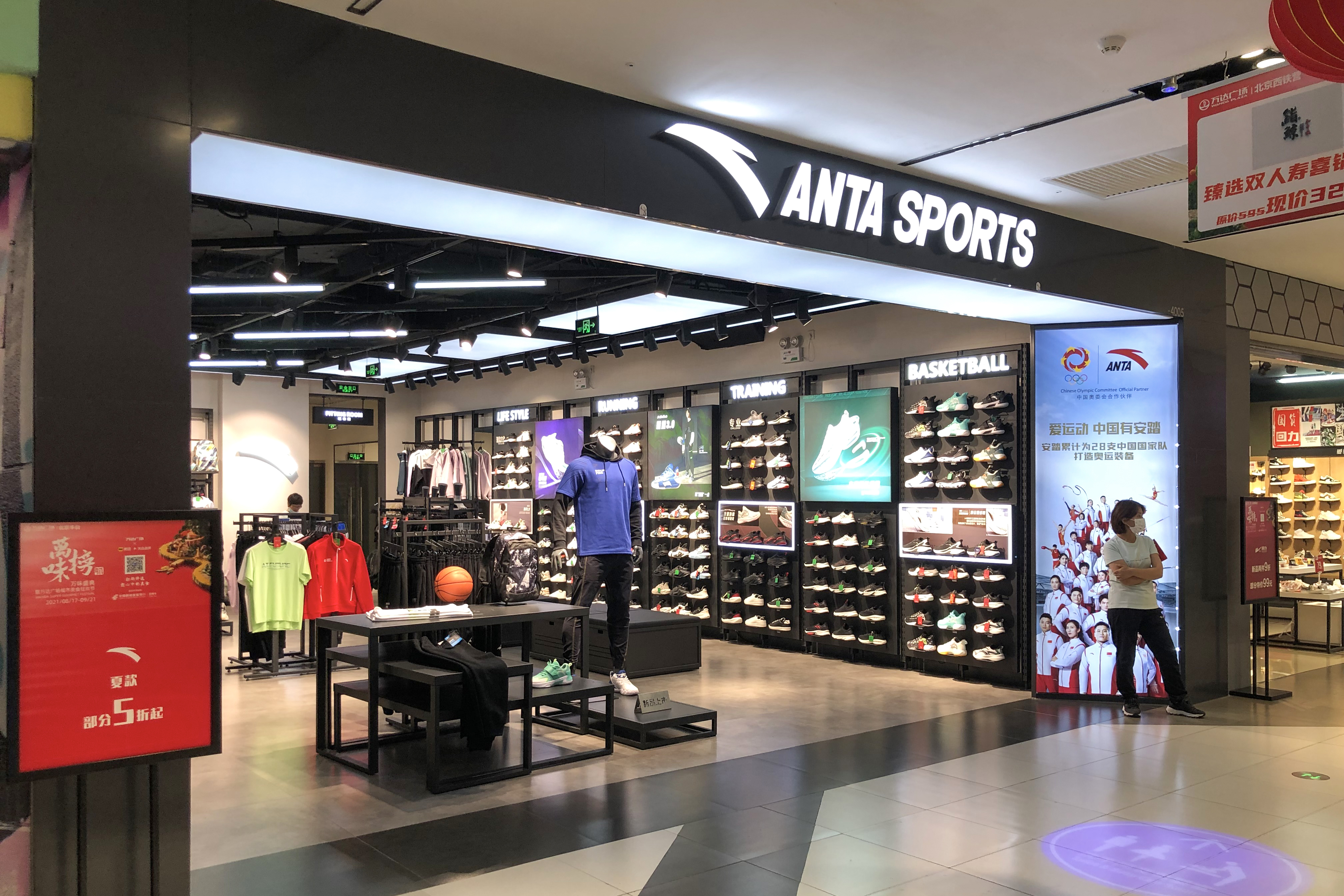
Anta Sports is a Chinese domestic brand.

Guochao (Chinese: 国潮; lit. 'national tide') is a cultural phenomenon in modern China characterized by a surge in national pride and the embrace of Chinese culture, particularly among younger generations such as Millennials and Gen Z.

This trend sees consumers favoring domestic brands and products that incorporate traditional Chinese elements, aesthetics, and cultural references, e.g. Anta Sports and Li-Ning over Adidas or Nike. It signifies a shift towards greater confidence in Chinese identity and a desire to celebrate Chinese heritage in modern contexts.

The COVID-19 pandemic increased nationalistic sentiments among Chinese consumers; the quick response by the Chinese government to stop the spread of the virus was impressive to its citizens, who could not shop internationally and purchase from established Western luxury brands during COVID lockdowns.

== See also ==
- Hallyu
- Little Pink
- Han chauvinism
- Tang ping
- Strawberry generation
- Chinese nationalism
