= List of Korean dramas associated with the Korean Wave =

Following the end of military rule in South Korea and the ensuing liberalization of the country's culture industry in the 1990s, an increasing number of Korean dramas began to be exported abroad. This marked the beginning of the Korean Wave, a broader cultural phenomenon encompassing the rise in global popularity of South Korean television, pop music, film, fashion, animation, literature, food, and cosmetics. During the 2000s, Jewel in the Palace and Winter Sonata achieved notable success within Asia, while in the following decades Squid Game achieved breakout success internationally.

== 1990s ==
=== 1991 ===
- Eyes of Dawn

=== 1992 ===
- Jealousy

=== 1996 ===
- First Love

=== 1997 ===
- Star in My Heart

=== 1999 ===
- Hur Jun

== 2000s ==
=== 2000 ===
- All About Eve
- Autumn in My Heart
- Fireworks

=== 2001 ===
- Four Sisters
- Hotelier

=== 2002 ===
- Successful Story of a Bright Girl
- Winter Sonata
- My Love Patzzi

=== 2003 ===
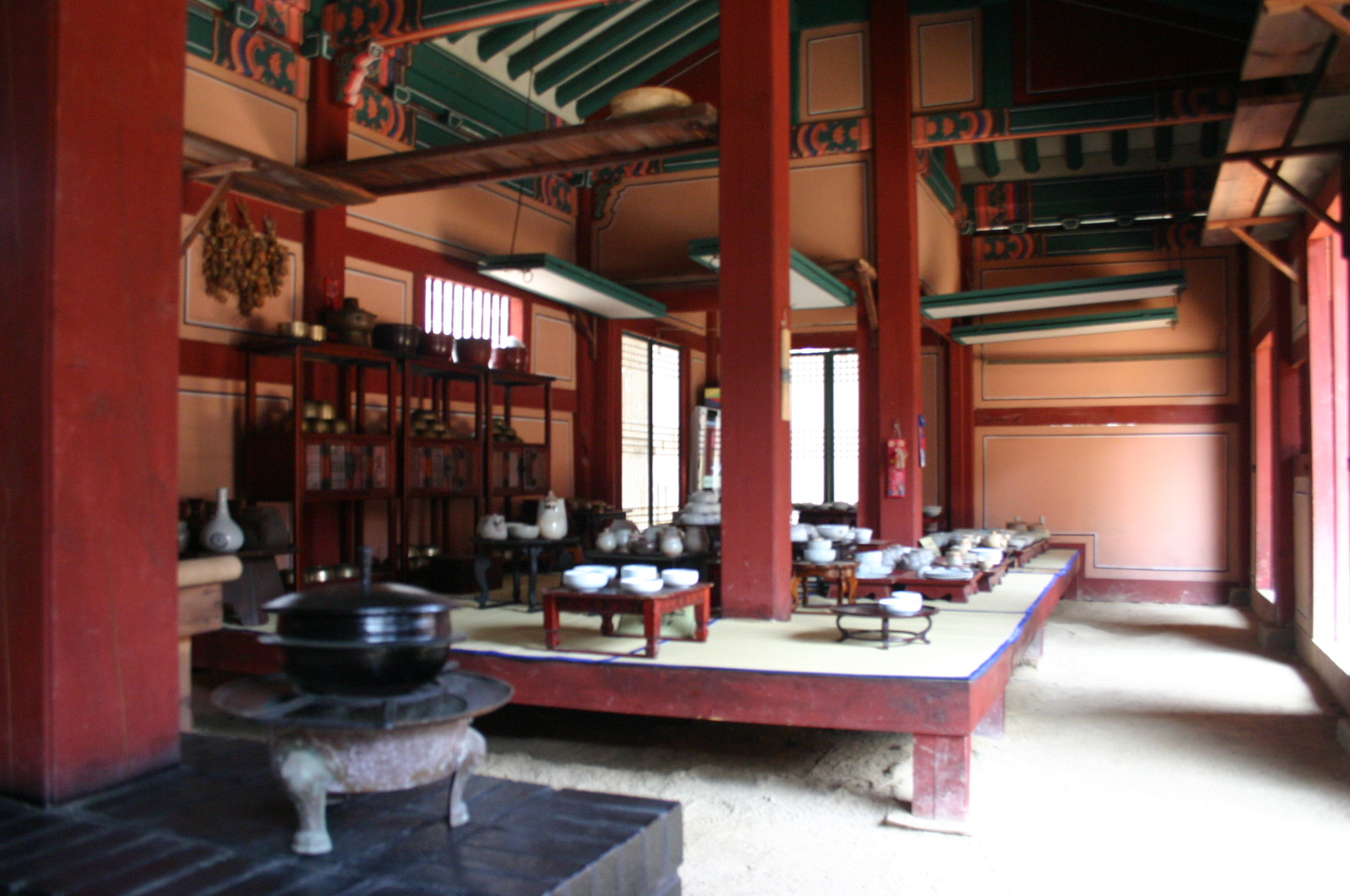
The filming location of Jewel in the Palace at Dae Jang Geum Theme Park

- All In
- Jewel in the Palace
- Damo
- Stairway to Heaven
- Summer Scent

=== 2004 ===
- Banjun Drama
- Full House
- I'm Sorry, I Love You
- Love Story in Harvard
- Lovers in Paris

=== 2005 ===
- Lovers in Prague
- My Girl
- My Lovely Sam Soon
- Sad Love Story
- Sassy Girl Chun-hyang
- Wonderful Life

=== 2006 ===
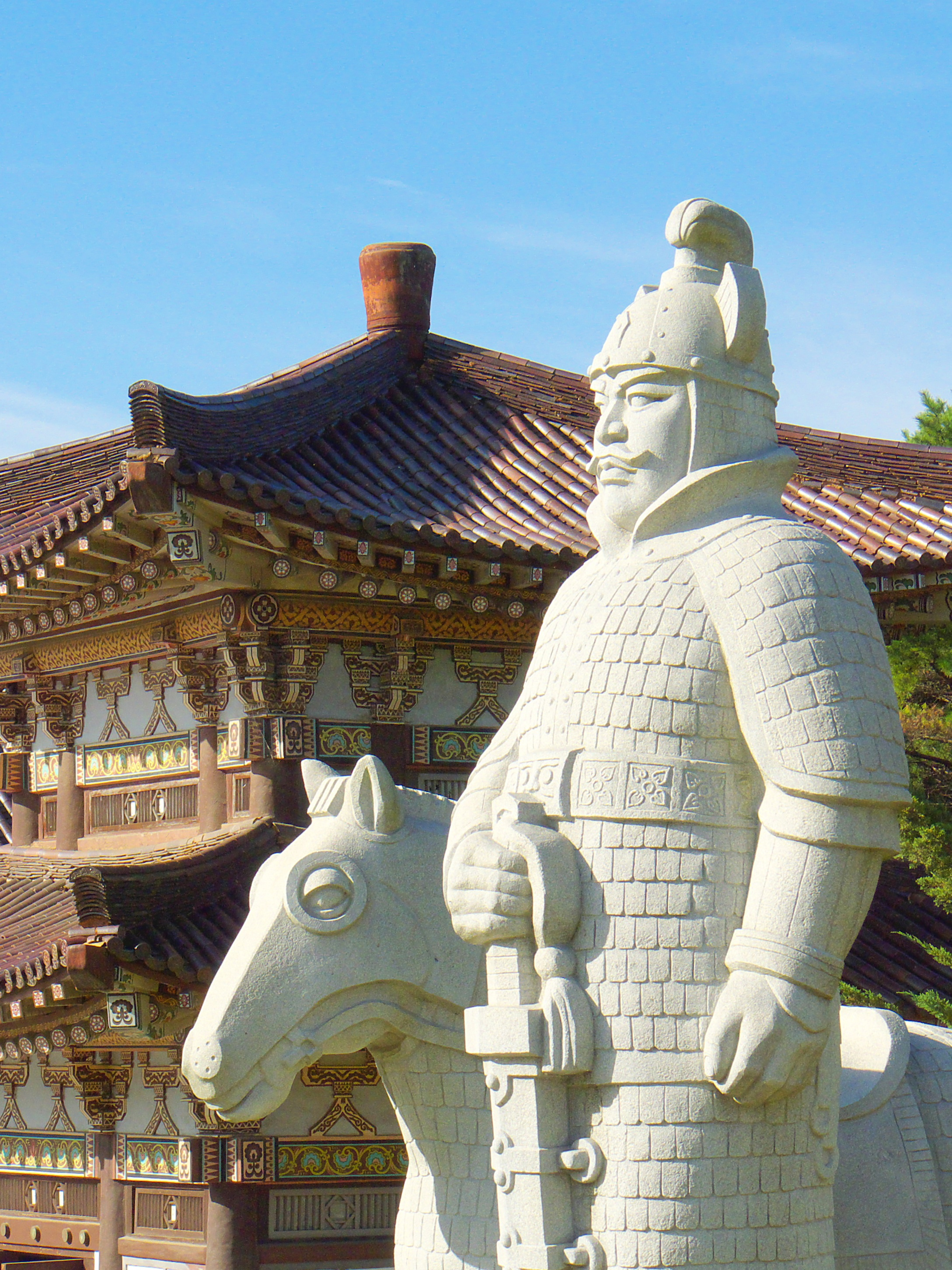
The historical K-drama Jumong depicts the life of Chumo the Holy (pictured), the founding monarch of Goguryeo.

- Infamous Seven Princesses
- Jumong
- Spring Waltz
- Queen of the Game

=== 2007 ===
- Coffee Prince
- The Legend

=== 2008 ===
- East of Eden
- The Kingdom of the Winds
- Temptation of Wife
- We Got Married

=== 2009 ===
- Boys over Flowers
- Iris
- Ja Myung Go
- Loving You a Thousand Times
- Queen Seondeok
- Smile, You
- You're Beautiful

== 2010s ==
=== 2010 ===
- The Great Merchant
- Life Is Beautiful
- My Girlfriend Is a Gumiho
- Pasta
- Playful Kiss
- Secret Garden
- The Slave Hunters
- Sungkyunkwan Scandal

=== 2011 ===
- 49 Days
- Dream High
- Manny
- My Princess
- The Greatest Love

=== 2012 ===
- Love Rain
- Reply 1997

=== 2013 ===
- Good Doctor
- The Heirs
- Monstar
- My Love from the Star
- Reply 1994

=== 2014 ===
- God's Gift: 14 Days

=== 2015 ===
- Reply 1988
- Who Are You: School 2015

=== 2016 ===
- Signal

=== 2017 ===
• Guardian: The Lonely and Great God

=== 2018 ===
- Mr. Sunshine

=== 2019 ===
- Crash Landing on You
- The Tale of Nokdu

== 2020s ==
=== 2020 ===
- Sweet Home

=== 2021 ===
- Squid Game

=== 2022 ===
- All of Us Are Dead

=== 2025 ===
- When Life Gives You Tangerines
