= Law on Rejecting Reactionary Ideology and Culture =

North Korean law

Presidium of the Supreme People's Assembly
- Passed by: Presidium of the Supreme People's Assembly
- Passed: 4 December 2020
- Status: In force

The Law on Rejecting Reactionary Ideology and Culture (Korean: 반동사상문화배격법) is a piece of North Korean legislation concerning "reactionary ideology and culture". It was passed by the Presidium of the Supreme People's Assembly on 4 December 2020 and was revised on 19 August 2022. The law sets strict limits on what it terms as "reactionary ideology and culture" from hostile forces, and prohibits the consumption and distribution of cultural content from enemy countries.

== Legislative history ==
The law was passed on 4 December 2020 during a session of the Presidium of the Supreme People’s Assembly presided by Choe Ryong-hae. The Korean Central News Agency reported that the law was aimed at "further cementing our ideological, revolutionary and class positions by thoroughly preventing the inroads and spread of the antisocialist ideology and culture and firmly maintaining our idea, spirit and culture". The law was amended in August 2022.

== Provisions ==
The law is made up of four chapters and 41 articles. Articles from 1 to 7 define and list the aims of the law. Articles from 8 to 14 mention the responsibilities of the local officials to enforce the law. Articles from 15 to 26 target the media violators of the law access and use. Articles from 27 to 40 detail the punishments to be applied to violators of the law.

Article 2 defines reactionary ideology and culture as "the rotten ideology and culture of hostile forces, including puppet [South Korean] publications that paralyze the revolutionary ideological consciousness and class consciousness of the masses and distort and degenerate society, as well as all kinds of unhealthy and exotic ideology and culture that are not of our style".

Article 27 specifies a punishment of reeducation through labor for not less than five years and not more than ten years for anyone "who has seen, heard, or kept puppet [South Korean] films, recordings, compilations, books, songs, drawings, or photographs, or who has imported or distributed puppet songs, drawings, photographs, or designs", with the penalty rising to more than ten years in serious cases.

Article 28 specifies a punishment of reeducation of labor for not more than five years for anyone "who has seen, heard, or kept enemy films, recordings, books, songs, paintings, or photographs, or who has imported or distributed enemy songs, paintings, photographs, or designs", with the penalty rising to not less than five years and not more than ten years in serious cases. Those that import or distribute "enemy films, recordings, edited materials, or books" are to be punished for reeducation through labor for more than ten years. The article also specifies a penalty of life-long reeducation through labor or death for those that "import or distribute a large quantity of enemy films, recordings, compilations, or books, or distribute them to a large number of people, or organize or encourage group viewing or reading of them".

Article 29 specifies a punishment of reeducation through labor for not less than five years and not more than ten years for anyone "who has viewed or kept a film, video, compilation, book, photograph, or drawing containing sexually explicit material or preaching obscenity or superstition", with the penalty rising to more than ten years in serious cases. It also specifies a penalty of life-long reeducation through labor for those that "create, import, or distribute films, recordings, compilations, books, photographs, or drawings that preach sexual immorality or superstition", with the penalty rising to death for those that "produce, import, distribute, distribute to a large number of people, or organize or encourages the viewing or reading of a large quantity" of such material.

Article 30 specifies a punishment of forced labor for not more than five years for those that have "seen, heard, or kept foreign films, recordings, compilations, books, songs, paintings, or photographs that run counter to socialist ideology and culture and our way of life, or who have illegally imported or distributed foreign songs, paintings, photographs, designs, or clothing". Those that "illegally import or distribute foreign films, recordings, edited materials, or books" are to be punished between five to ten years.

Article 31 specifies a punishment of forced labor for anyone that has "seen, heard, or kept recordings, compilations, photographs, or printed materials containing impure culture". Those that create and distribute such content are to be punished by reeducation through labor for up to three years.

Article 32 specifies a punishment by short-term labor for those anyone who "speaks or writes in a [South Korean] puppet-like manner, sings in a puppet-like manner, or creates printed materials in a puppet-like style", with serious offenders being punished for up to two years.

== See also ==
- Youth Education Guarantee Law
- Pyongyang Cultural Language Protection Act
