= Pyongyang Cultural Language Protection Act =

2023 North Korean law

Standing Committee of the Supreme People's Assembly
- Passed by: Standing Committee of the Supreme People's Assembly
- Passed: 18 January 2023
- Status: In force

The Pyongyang Cultural Language Protection Act (Korean: 평양문화어보호법) is a legislation concerning prohibiting South Korean-style language in North Korea. It was passed by the Standing Committee of the Supreme People's Assembly on 18 January 2023. The law criminalizes the use of South Korean-style language and expressions by North Koreans, with a maximum penalty of death.

== History ==
The law was passed on 18 January 2023.

== Provisions ==
The law is made up of five chapters and 65 articles. Article 2 describes South Korean language as "a jumbled together language that has completely lost the essentials of the Korean language due to its vocabulary, grammar and intonation becoming Westernized, Japanized and Sinicized. It is a lowly and disgusting garbage language that exists nowhere else in the world".

Article 5 states that the "nationwide struggle to completely eliminate remnants of the puppet language" as a "serious political and class struggle that affects the very fate of our socialist system and the very existence of our people and future generations".

Article 6 states that "the State shall treat anyone who imitates or spreads the puppet [South Korean] language as garbage contaminated with puppet culture and as criminals. Anyone, regardless of the seriousness of the matter, shall face serious legal sanctions, including the death penalty."

Article 19 (Ban on Imitating Puppet Style Titles) prohibits citizens from "the use of titles in the puppet style such as young people calling non-relatives oppa [elder brother] or adding nim [an honorific attached to the end of titles or names] at the end of a professional title." The article continues by saying "citizens can use the title oppa until the end of their time in the Korean Children’s Union, but starting from their time in the Socialist Patriotic Youth League, they must use the titles dongji and dongmu."

Article 22 (Ban on Imitating Puppet Style Intonation) prohibits citizens from imitating "puppet style intonation by raising and lengthening their intonation at the end of a phrase in an obsequious, lilting and nauseating way." It calls South Korean-style accent "a long drag of the tail of a horse that is servile, revealing, and disgusting".

Article 31 (Strengthening Education and Control to Eliminate the Puppet Language Style) mandates institutions, enterprises, and organizations to "strengthen education and controls over their employees and students to ensure they clearly understand that supporting the schemes of the enemies to distort our style of socialism from within is a traitorous act".

Article 33 mandates "notification and criticism of parents who fail to properly educate their children".

Article 35 (Education Through Public Struggle) mandates legal institutions, including social safety institutions to "conduct public struggles in various formats and sizes, including revelations through documentation, mass struggle meetings, public arrests, public trials, and public executions to break the spirits of those contaminated by rotten puppet culture and to awaken the masses at large".

Article 58 (The Crime of Using the Puppet Language) specifices a penalty of six years or more of reform through labor for anyone that is "found to be speaking, writing, sending messages, or exchanging emails in the puppet language or creating printed materials, video recordings, compilations, pictures, photographs, or scrolls using the puppet language’s writing style".

Article 59 (The Crime of Propagating the Puppet Language) specifices a penalty of ten years or more of reform through labor for anyone that is "found to be teaching the puppet language to others or circulating printed materials, video recordings, compilations, pictures, photographs or scrolls using the puppet language writing style", with the penalty rising to lifetime sentence of reform through labor or the death penalty in serious cases.

== See also ==
- Law on Rejecting Reactionary Ideology and Culture
- Youth Education Guarantee Law
