= Youth Education Guarantee Law =

2021 North Korean law

Supreme People's Assembly
- Passed by: Supreme People's Assembly
- Passed: 29 September 2021
- Status: In force

The Youth Education Guarantee Law (Korean: 청년교양보장법) is a legislation regarding youth education in North Korea. It was passed by the Supreme People's Assembly on 29 September 2021.

== History ==
The law was passed during the Fifth Meeting of the 14th Supreme People's Assembly on 29 September 2021.

== Provisions ==
The law is made up of five chapters and 45 articles. Article 41 contains a list of prohibited acts for youth.
