= Tarot (disambiguation) =

The tarot refers to a pack of playing cards used from the mid-15th century to play games and, later, also for cartomantic packs of cards used for divination.

Tarot may also refer to:

- Tarot card reading, a form of cartomancy
- Tarot card games, games played with Tarot decks, also known as Tarock decks
  - French Tarot, a trick-taking card game

== Comics ==
- Tarot (comics), Marvel Comics character
- Tarot: Witch of the Black Rose, American comic book
- The Tarot Café, series of manhwa comics by Sang-Sun Park

== Music ==
- Tarot (Dark Moor album), 2007
- Tarot (Æther Realm album), 2017
- Tarot (band), heavy metal band from Finland
- Tarot, LP from Walter Wegmüller
- "Tarot" (song), by Bad Bunny and Jhayco, 2022

== Film and television ==
- Tarot (TV series), a 2024 South Korean television series
- Tarot, lead character in the television series Ace of Wands
- Tarot, 1973 film directed by José María Forqué
- Tarot (1986 film), a German drama film
- Tarot (2009 film), a Filipino horror-thriller film
- Tarot (2024 American film), an American horror film
- Tarot (2024 South Korean film), a South Korean anthology horror film

== Other uses ==
- Tarout Island, an island in the Persian Gulf belonging to the Eastern Province of Saudi Arabia
- Tarot series, a trilogy of novels by Piers Anthony
- T.A.R.O.T., a fictional international criminal network in the James Bond 007 role-playing game
