= Dinner Mate =

2020 South Korean television series

- Promotional poster
- Also known as: Let's Have Dinner Together?
- Hangul: 저녁 같이 드실래요?
- Lit.: Would You Like To Have Dinner Together?
- RR: Jeonyeok gachi deusillaeyo?
- MR: Chŏnyŏk kach'i tŭsillaeyo?
- Genre: Romance
- Based on: Would You Like To Have Dinner Together? by Park Si-in
- Developed by: Park Jae-beom
- Written by: Kim Joo; Lee Ju-ha
- Directed by: Ko Jae-hyun
- Starring: Song Seung-heon; Seo Ji-hye; Lee Ji-hoon; Son Na-eun
- Opening theme: "Dinner Mate Open Title" by Jonghyuk Jeon
- Country of origin: South Korea
- Original language: Korean
- No. of episodes: 32 (2 episodes per day) (Note: In order to circumvent Korean laws that prevent commercial breaks in the middle of an episode, what would previously have been aired as single 70 minute episodes are now being repackaged as two 35 minute episodes, with two episodes being shown each night with a commercial break between the two.)

Production
- Producers: Go Jae-hyun; Park Bong-sub
- Camera setup: Single-camera
- Running time: 35 minutes
- Production company: Victory Contents

Original release
- Network: MBC TV
- Release: May 25 – July 14, 2020

Dinner Mate (Korean: 저녁 같이 드실래요?) is a 2020 South Korean television series starring Song Seung-heon, Seo Ji-hye, Lee Ji-hoon, and Son Na-eun, and based on the 2013 webtoon Would You Like To Have Dinner Together? by Park Si-in. The series is about an unexpected dinner between two strangers in a restaurant, Woo Do-hee (played by Seo Ji-hye) and Kim Hae-kyung (played by Song Seung-heon). The two happen to have dinner together at a random place and decide to become dinner partners. The drama was aired by MBC TV on Mondays and Tuesdays from May 25 to July 14, 2020. It was also available globally on iQIYI with multi-language subtitles.

== Synopsis ==
Woo Do-hee (Seo Ji-hye), a producer at a digital content company, and Kim Hae-kyung (Song Seung-heon), a psychiatrist, meet by coincidence and end up eating dinner together. Later, they meet again by coincidence and decided to become "dinner mates". With no knowledge of each other's personal details (name, occupation, etc.), they only meet up to eat dinner and talk.

== Cast ==
=== Main ===
- Song Seung-heon as Kim Hae-kyung, a psychiatrist and food psychotherapist.
- Seo Ji-hye as Woo Do-hee, a producer-director at 2N BOX.
- Lee Ji-hoon as Jeong Jae-hyeok, a medical journalist freelancer. Do-hee's first love in college.
- Son Na-eun as Jin No-eul, a fitness instructor. Hae-kyung's first love.

=== People around Hae Kyung ===
- Lee Hyun-jin as Kang Gun-woo, stylist.
- Kim Seo-kyung as Lee Byeong-jin, Hae-kyung's secretary.
- Jeon Guk-hyang as Lee Moon-jung, Hae-kyung's mother.

=== 2N BOX ===
- Ye Ji-won as Nam Ah-yeong, CEO of 2N BOX and friend of PD Woo Do-hee.
- Ko Kyu-pil as Park Jin-kyoo, planning team leader.
- Ahn Tae-hwan as Kim Jung-hwan, planning team member.
- Oh Hye-won as Im So-ra, ASMR creator.
- Kim Young-chul as Jjoda Man.

=== Do-hee's family ===
- Jung Eun-pyo as Woo In-ho, Do-hee's father.
- Yoon Bok-in as Jun Sung-ja, Do-hee's mother.

=== Others ===
- Park Ho-san as Keanu / Kim Hyun-u

=== Special appearances ===
- Kim Jung-hyun as Lee Young-dong, Do-hee's ex-boyfriend (Ep. 1–2)
- Jung Sang-hoon as ER doctor (Ep. 2)
- Kim Hyun-sook as Keun-hee (Ep. 1–2, 8)
- Lee Si-eon as food truck operator (Ep. 3)
- Sandara Park as Hae-kyung's patient (Ep. 11)
- Tae Jin-ah as himself (Ep. 4)
- Kim Won-hae as depressed widower (Ep. 7)
- Kim Jae-won
- Seo Eun-soo as flight attendant (Ep. 1–2)
- Ryu Ji-kwang as himself (Ep. 14)
- Kim Hee-jung as eating show host (Ep. 14)
- ?? as Do-hee's blind date mate (Ep. 28)

== Production ==
=== Development ===
The series is the third collaboration between director Ko Jae-hyun and actor Song Seung-heon after Black and Player.

== Original soundtrack ==
Dinner Mate OST

Soundtrack album by Various Artists
- Released: 2020
- Genre: Soundtrack
- Languages: Korean; English
- Labels: Warner Music Korea; Victory Contents

=== Part 1 ===
Released on May 25, 2020
| No. | Title | Lyrics | Music | Artist | Length |
|---|---|---|---|---|---|
| 1. | "Would You Like to Have Dinner" (저녁 같이 드실래요) | OVAN, Mr.Black | VAN.C | OVAN | 3:18 |
| 2. | "Would You Like to Have Dinner" (Inst.) | | VAN.C | | 3:18 |
| Total length: | | | | | 6:36 |

=== Special track ===
Released on May 30, 2020
| No. | Title | Lyrics | Music | Artist | Length |
|---|---|---|---|---|---|
| 1. | "The Girl Come and Go" (오다가다 그녀) | Lee Ryu | Lee Soo-ha | Tae Jin Ah | 3:32 |
| 2. | "The Girl Come and Go" (Inst.) | | | | 3:32 |
| Total length: | | | | | 7:04 |

=== Part 2 ===
Released on June 2, 2020
| No. | Title | Lyrics | Music | Artist | Length |
|---|---|---|---|---|---|
| 1. | "Yummy Yummy " (얌얌) | Lee Hyun-seung, MC Mong, Chancellor, TM | Lee Hyun-seung, TM | MC Mong | 3:33 |
| 2. | "Yummy Yummy" (Inst.) | | Lee Hyun-seung, TM | | 3:33 |
| Total length: | | | | | 7:06 |

=== Part 3 ===
Released on June 6, 2020
| No. | Title | Lyrics | Music | Artist | Length |
|---|---|---|---|---|---|
| 1. | "Dear My Star" (나의 별) | Kang Hyo-jun | Lee Hyun-seung, TM | Sondia | 3:36 |
| 2. | "Dear My Star" (Inst.) | | Lee Hyun-seung, TM | | 3:36 |
| Total length: | | | | | 7:12 |

=== Part 4 ===
Released on June 9, 2020
| No. | Title | Lyrics | Music | Artist | Length |
|---|---|---|---|---|---|
| 1. | "More Than Words" (사랑한다는 말로는) | Mr.Black | SHAUN | SHAUN | 3:17 |
| 2. | "More Than Words" (Inst.) | | SHAUN | | 3:17 |
| Total length: | | | | | 6:34 |

=== Part 5 ===
Released on June 16, 2020
| No. | Title | Lyrics | Music | Artist | Length |
|---|---|---|---|---|---|
| 1. | "Midnight Cinderella" | Mingji, Eun, EJAE | Andrew Choi, Mingji, EJAE | Eun | 3:51 |
| 2. | "Midnight Cinderella" (Inst.) | | Andrew Choi, Mingji, EJAE | | 3:51 |
| Total length: | | | | | 7:02 |

== Viewership ==
Dinner Mate : South Korea viewers per episode (thousands)

| Episodes | Episode number | | | | | | | | | | | | | | | |
| Episodes | 1 | 2 | 3 | 4 | 5 | 6 | 7 | 8 | 9 | 10 | 11 | 12 | 13 | 14 | 15 | 16 |
|---|---|---|---|---|---|---|---|---|---|---|---|---|---|---|---|---|
| 1–16 | N/A | 1065 | 901 | 919 | N/A | N/A | N/A | 825 | N/A | N/A | N/A | N/A | N/A | N/A | N/A | 738 |
| 17–32 | N/A | N/A | N/A | 802 | N/A | 895 | N/A | 793 | N/A | N/A | N/A | 770 | N/A | N/A | N/A | 759 |

Source: Audience measurement performed nationwide by Nielsen Media Research.

| Ep. | Original broadcast date | Average audience share | |
| Ep. | Original broadcast date | Nielsen Korea | |
| Ep. | Original broadcast date | Nationwide | Seoul |
|---|---|---|---|
| 1 | May 25, 2020 | 4.8% | —N/a |
| 2 | May 25, 2020 | 6.1% | 6.5% |
| 3 | May 26, 2020 | 5.7% | 6.4% |
| 4 | May 26, 2020 | 5.9% | 6.8% |
| 5 | June 1, 2020 | 4.1% | 5.2% |
| 6 | June 1, 2020 | 4.8% | —N/a |
| 7 | June 2, 2020 | 4.4% | 5.1% |
| 8 | June 2, 2020 | 4.9% | —N/a |
| 9 | June 8, 2020 | 3.5% | —N/a |
| 10 | June 8, 2020 | 4.4% | —N/a |
| 11 | June 9, 2020 | 3.4% | —N/a |
| 12 | June 9, 2020 | 3.9% | 4.3% |
| 13 | June 15, 2020 | 3.0% | —N/a |
| 14 | June 15, 2020 | 3.7% | —N/a |
| 15 | June 16, 2020 | 3.0% | —N/a |
| 16 | June 16, 2020 | 4.2% | 4.6% |
| 17 | June 22, 2020 | 3.5% | —N/a |
| 18 | June 22, 2020 | 4.9% | 5.2% |
| 19 | June 23, 2020 | 3.4% | —N/a |
| 20 | June 23, 2020 | 4.8% | 5.1% |
| 21 | June 29, 2020 | 3.3% | —N/a |
| 22 | June 29, 2020 | 4.8% | 5.0% |
| 23 | June 30, 2020 | 3.0% | —N/a |
| 24 | June 30, 2020 | 4.4% | —N/a |
| 25 | July 6, 2020 | 2.3% | —N/a |
| 26 | July 6, 2020 | 3.1% | —N/a |
| 27 | July 7, 2020 | 2.6% | —N/a |
| 28 | July 7, 2020 | 3.4% | —N/a |
| 29 | July 13, 2020 | 2.9% | —N/a |
| 30 | July 13, 2020 | 3.7% | —N/a |
| 31 | July 14, 2020 | 2.9% | —N/a |
| 32 | July 14, 2020 | 4.3% | —N/a |
| Average | | 4.0% | — (Note: Due to some ratings not recorded, the exact average rating is unknown.) |

== Awards and nominations ==
Name of the award ceremony, year presented, category, nominee of the award, and the result of the nomination
| Award ceremony | Year | Category | Nominee / Work | Result | Ref. |
|---|---|---|---|---|---|
| MBC Drama Awards | 2020 | Drama of the Year | Dinner Mate | Nominated | |
| MBC Drama Awards | 2020 | Top Excellence Award, Actor in a Monday-Tuesday Miniseries / Short Drama | Song Seung-heon | Nominated | |
| MBC Drama Awards | 2020 | Excellence Award, Actor in a Monday-Tuesday Miniseries / Short Drama | Lee Ji-hoon | Nominated | |
| MBC Drama Awards | 2020 | Best New Actress | Son Na-eun | Nominated | |
| MBC Drama Awards | 2020 | Best Couple Award | Song Seung-heon and Seo Ji-hye | Nominated | |
| Seoul International Drama Awards | 2021 | Outstanding Korean Drama | Dinner Mate | Nominated | |
