= Eun-soo =

- Hangul: 은수
- RR: Eunsu
- MR: Ŭnsu
- IPA: [ɯnsu]

Eun-soo, also spelled Eun-su or Un-soo, is a Korean given name.

People with this name include:

- Oh Eun-su (born 1993), South Korean curler
- Seo Eun-soo (born Lee Jeong-min, 1994), South Korean actress
- Shin Eun-soo (born 2002), South Korean actress
- Lim Eun-soo (born 2003), South Korean figure skater

Fictional characters with this name include:

- Eun-su, in 1993 South Korean film Kid Cop
- Eun-soo, in 2002 South Korean film Addicted
- Han Eun-soo, in 2007 South Korean television series Que Sera, Sera
- Ji Eun-soo, in 2004 South Korean television series Save the Last Dance for Me
- Lee Eun-soo, in 2007 South Korean film Hansel and Gretel
- Yoo Eun-soo, in 2012 South Korean television series Faith
- Lee Eun-soo, in 2013 South Korean television series Your Lady

== See also ==
- List of Korean given names
