= The Noisy Mansion =

2025 film by Lee Ru-da

- Theatrical release poster
- Directed by: Lee Ru-da
- Written by: Lee Ru-da
- Produced by: Ma Dong-seok; Oh Eun-young; Choi Wonki
- Starring: Kyung Soo-jin; Ko Kyu-pil; Lee Ji-hoon; Kim Joo-ryoung; Choi Yoo-jung
- Edited by: Ha Mi-ra
- Music by: Cho Seong-jin
- Production companies: EO Contents Group; Nova Film; Big Punch Pictures
- Distributed by: Plus M Entertainment
- Release dates: November 10, 2024 (London); February 26, 2025 (South Korea)
- Running time: 97 minutes
- Country: South Korea
- Language: Korean
- Box office: US$252,521

The Noisy Mansion (Korean: 백수아파트; RR: Baeksu apateu) is a 2024 South Korean mystery comedy film written and directed by Lee Ru-da. It stars Kyung Soo-jin, Ko Kyu-pil, Lee Ji-hoon, Kim Joo-ryoung and Choi Yoo-jung. The film first screened at the London Korean Film Festival on November 10, 2024 before its release on February 26, 2025.

== Synopsis ==
Geo-ul resides with her family, which includes her younger brother Doo-on. She is loud and unmarried. She resolves any grievance raised by her neighbors. She doesn't get along with her brother, so their connection is strained. She resolves to become independent after they argue one day. She moves in alone in Baeksoo Apartment. She hears sounds coming through the flooring at four in the morning on her first night in her new house. The unidentified noise keeps her from falling asleep. Geo-ul investigates the mystery of the sounds coming from the floors with her neighbors.

== Cast ==
- Kyung Soo-jin as Ahn Geo-ul
- Ko Kyu-pil as Ahn Gyeong-seok
- Lee Ji-hoon as Ahn Doo-on
- Kim Joo-ryoung as Ji-won
- Choi Yoo-jung as Saet-byeol
- Jung Hee-tae as Security guard
- Park Jeong-hak as Moo-hak
- Cha Woo-jin as Se-on
- Bae Jae-young as Dong-oh
- Park Hyun-young as Church woman

== Production ==
Principal photography began on November 14, 2023 and ended on late December 2023.

== Reception ==
As of March 24, 2025 The Noisy Mansion has grossed $252,521 with a running total of 42,561 tickets sold.
