= Lee Ji-hoon (actor, born 1988) =

South Korean actor

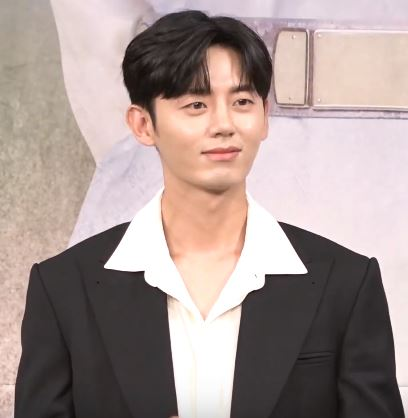
- Lee in 2019
- Born: October 29, 1988 (age 37); Namyangju, South Korea
- Other name: Ji Hoon
- Education: Hallym University
- Occupation: Actor
- Years active: 2012–present
- Agent: FN Entertainment

Korean name
- Hangul: 이지훈
- RR: I Jihun
- MR: I Chihun

Lee Ji-hoon (born October 29, 1988) is a South Korean actor. He made his acting debut in the teen series School 2013, and has played supporting roles in family dramas You Are the Best! and Golden Rainbow.

== Filmography ==
=== Film ===
Year	Title	Role	Notes/Ref.
2012	Return of the Mafia	Passerby	
2013	Jinx!!!	Lee Tae-woong	
2014	Body Rhythms	Han Oh-ki	short film
2014	A Hard Day	Officer in charge of police armory	Cameo
2016	Proof of Innocence	Young detective	
2019	Dad is pretty	Kim Hyun-woo	Cameo
2023	The Gap	Seung-jin	
2025	The Noisy Mansion	Ahn Doo-on	
TBA	Under Your Bed	Ji-hoon	

=== Television series ===
Year	Title	Role
2012	School 2013	Lee Ji-hoon
2013	You Are the Best!	Jo In-sung
2013	Golden Rainbow	Kim Yeol-won
2015	Blood	J
2015–16	Six Flying Dragons	Heo Kang / Lee Shin-juk
2016	Secret Healer	King Seonjo
2016	Gogh, The Starry Night	Hwang Ji-hoon
2016	KBS Drama Special – The Legendary Shuttle	Kang Chan
2016	The Legend of the Blue Sea	Heo Chi-hyun
2017	Whisper	young Choi Il-hwan (cameo)
2017	Band of Sisters	Seol Ki-chan
2018	The Hymn of Death	Hong Nan-pa
2018	Your House Helper	Kwon Jin-kook
2019	Rookie Historian Goo Hae-ryung	Min Woo-won
2019	Woman of 9.9 Billion	Lee Jae-hoon
2020	Dinner Mate	Jung Jae-hyuk
2021	River Where the Moon Rises	Go Geon
2022	Sponsor	Lee Seon-woo
2025	Good Boy	Lee Hoon

=== Variety shows ===
Year	Title	Notes/Ref.
2013	Mamma Mia	Panelist
2013	Fashion King Korea (Season 1)	Cast member
2013–2014	World Challenge - Here We Go	Cast member
2021	Family Register Mate	Special Cast

== Theater ==
Year	English title	Korean title	Role	Ref.
2022–2023	Clumsy People	서툰 사람들	Jang Deok-bae	

== Awards and nominations ==
Year presented, name of the award ceremony, category, nominated work, and the result of the nomination
Year	Award	Category	Nominated work	Result
2013	KBS Drama Awards	Best New Actor	You Are the Best!	Nominated
2016	KBS Drama Awards	Best Actor in a One-Act/Special/Short Drama	The Legendary Shuttle	Nominated
2016	SBS Drama Awards	Special Award, Actor in a Fantasy Drama	The Legend of the Blue Sea	Nominated
2019	MBC Drama Awards	Best Supporting Cast in a Wednesday-Thursday Miniseries	Rookie Historian Goo Hae-ryung	Won
2020	MBC Drama Awards	Excellence Award, Actor in a Monday-Tuesday Miniseries / Short Drama	Dinner Mate	Nominated
