= Song Seung-heon =

South Korean actor (born 1976)

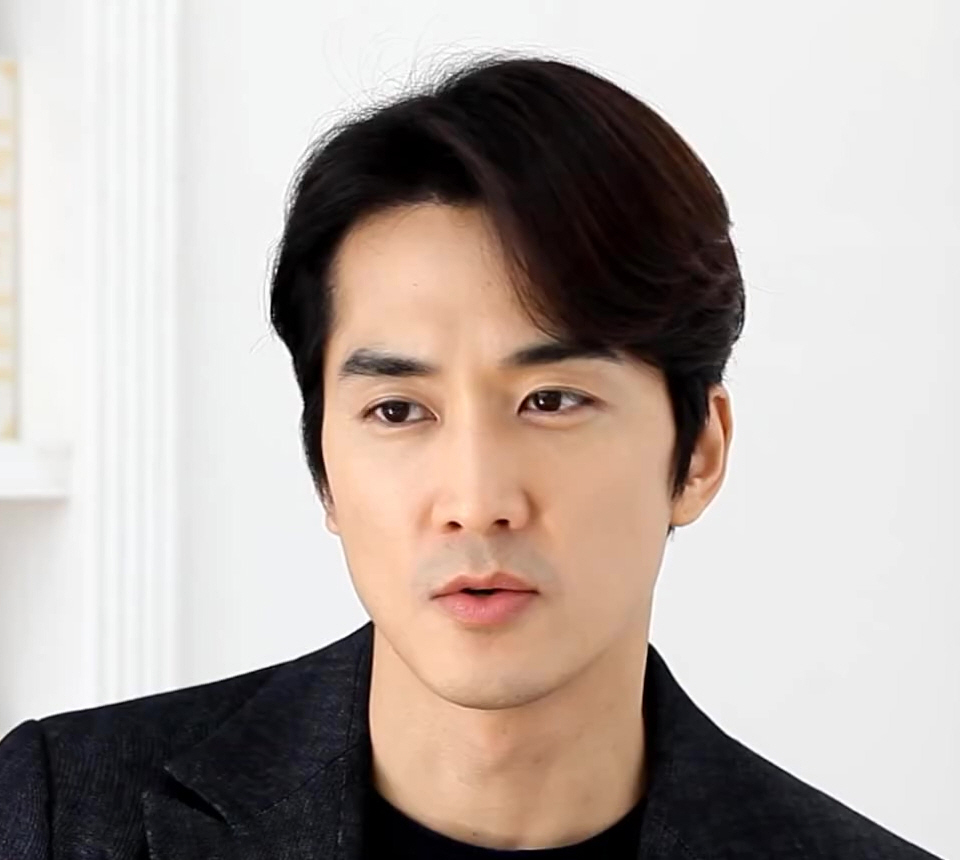
- Song in 2015
- Born: October 5, 1976 (age 50); Mia-dong, Gangbuk District, Seoul, South Korea
- Education: Hankyong National University; Kyonggi University
- Occupation: Actor
- Years active: 1995–present
- Agent: King Kong by Starship

Korean name
- Hangul: 송승헌
- Hanja: 宋承憲
- RR: Song Seungheon
- MR: Song Sŭnghŏn

Song Seung-heon (Korean: 송승헌; born October 5, 1976) is a South Korean model and actor. He has acted in various television dramas, notably Autumn in My Heart (2000), East of Eden (2008), My Princess (2011), Black (2017), Player (2018), The Great Show (2019), and Dinner Mate (2020).

== Career ==
=== 1995–2004: Beginnings and Pan-asia stardom ===
Song Seung-heon began his career in 1995 as a model for the jeans brand 292513=STORM, and first became known to viewers in the popular sitcom Three Guys, Three Girls in 1996. The following year he debuted as an actor. His feature film debut came in 1999 in the film Calla co-starring Kim Hee-sun.

True stardom came to Song in late 2000, with the broadcast of the hugely popular TV drama Autumn in My Heart. The romantic melodrama series was a ratings success, pioneering a trend in Korean melodramatic series and launching a fever that is commonly referred to as the "Korean Wave" and leading to Song becoming a Hallyu star. Since then he has been actively recruited for film roles and advertisements in Japan, Hong Kong and other Asian countries.

In 2002, Song starred in the action comedy Make It Big by director Cho Ui-seok, and also in the Hong Kong film So Close with actresses Karen Mok, Shu Qi and Zhao Wei.

Song further solidified his status as a Hallyu (Korean Wave) star in 2003 with Summer Scent, co-starring Son Ye-jin. The series is the third "season-themed" Yoon Seok-ho TV drama after Autumn in My Heart and Winter Sonata, but did not become as popular as the ones that preceded it.

In 2004, Song appeared in two films, but neither was a success: Ice Rain, shot in the Canadian Rockies, failed to enthuse viewers with its mixture of mountaineering and melodrama, while He Was Cool, based on an internet novel by Guiyeoni, was unable to compete with Harry Potter and the Prisoner of Azkaban and other films from the 2004 summer season.

=== 2005–2007: Enlistment and scandal ===
Meanwhile, in late 2004, just as he was getting ready to start shooting another high-profile TV drama Sad Love Story, it was revealed that the actor had illegally avoided his compulsory military service by submitting tainted urine samples that suggested he was suffering from certain illnesses and was thus unfit for the army. Amidst the press coverage and scandal this aroused, Song agreed to immediately serve his two-year term in the military. Song was discharged on November 15, 2006, with the rank of corporal, to much fanfare and media attention. For a time he kept a low profile, trying to gauge public opinion on his return to the entertainment world.

=== 2008–2013: Comeback ===
For his comeback, Song took on a tough image, playing aggressive and masculine roles in the 2008 drama East of Eden, which he won the "Daesang" (Grand Prize) for at the MBC Drama Awards. He also starred in the action film Fate, and the 2010 remake A Better Tomorrow.

His popularity in Japan continued, and in 2010 he starred in Ghost remake Ghost: In Your Arms Again with Matsushima Nanako.

In 2011, Song starred in My Princess opposite Kim Tae-hee, his first romantic comedy. He considers the series a turning point in his career, saying, "Previously, I took on characters living a life full of ups and downs. For me, Hae-young was the first character that was so rich, bright and cheerful. I felt much lighter while acting the character."

His 30-minute short film Lucid Dreaming, helmed by director Chang of 2008 feature Death Bell, was shot particularly for his fans in China and Japan and released on DVD in early 2012.

Based on the original comic by Motoka Murakami and previously dramatized in Japan, in 2012's Dr. Jin Song played the titular smart and cold-hearted surgeon who takes a journey back through time to the late 19th century Joseon Dynasty (1392-1910). He then played a cold-hearted loan shark and gangster who morphs into a successful businessman for his love in 2013 melodrama When a Man Falls in Love.

=== 2014–present: Mature roles ===
In 2014, Song starred in Kim Dae-woo's erotic period film Obsessed. Set in 1969 at the end of the Vietnam War, he played a high-ranking officer suffering from post-traumatic stress disorder who falls into an obsessive love affair with his subordinate's wife.

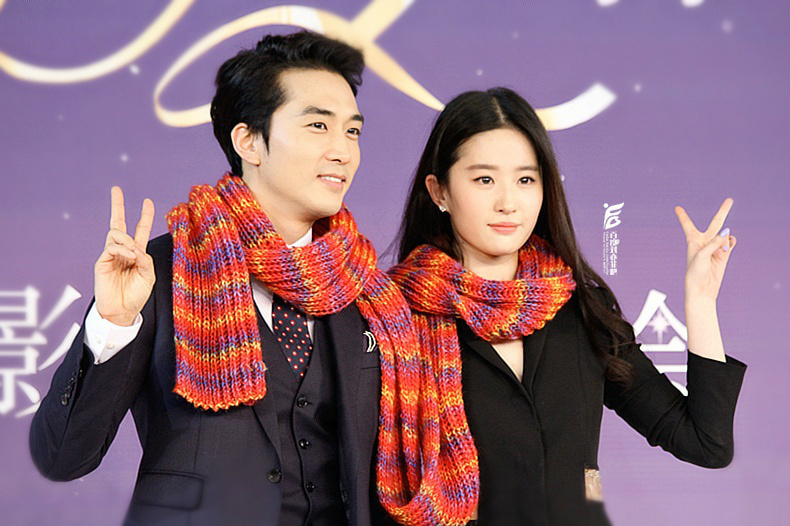
Song and Liu Yifei 2015

In 2015, he starred in the Chinese romantic melodrama The Third Way of Love, followed by family comedy Wonderful Nightmare. Song was next cast as a fighter pilot in his second Chinese project, World War II film Air Strike. He is also set to star in the film Man of Will, portraying a cruel and cold-hearted prison director.

Back on the Korean screen in 2017, Song starred opposite Lee Young-ae in period drama Saimdang, Memoir of Colors, about the Joseon artist and calligrapher Shin Saimdang; Song played a fictional character, an aristocrat and painter who has loved the heroine since childhood. The same year, he was cast in the fantasy thriller drama Black alongside Go Ara, playing the role of a grim reaper. Song reunited with Black director Ko Jae-hyun in another OCN drama Player in 2018, playing the role of a con-artist.

In 2019, Song starred in the political family comedy drama The Great Show. In April 2019, Song signed with new agency King Kong by Starship.

In 2020, Song starred in the romance drama Dinner Mate as a psychiatrist.

In 2021, Song took the role as the main lead in the fourth season of Voice.

== Other activities ==
In 2009, he founded his own management agency, Storm S Company (later renamed Better ENT, now majority-owned by KOSDAQ-listed Signal Entertainment Group). It currently manages actors Kim Min-jung, Chae Jung-an, and Goo Jae-yi. Song also owns the Sinsa-dong branch of Italian restaurant chain Blacksmith, launched by Caffe Bene.

In 2011, Song was named PR ambassador for cultural sharing by the Korea Foundation. His role was to promote Korean language, food and other cultural heritages overseas. In 2015, he was named as a promotional ambassador for the National Tax Service.

== Filmography ==
=== Film ===
Year	Title	Role	Notes	Ref.
1999	Calla	Kim Sun-woo		
2002	Make It Big	Seong-hwan		
2002	So Close	Yen	Hong Kong film	
2004	Ice Rain	Han Woo-sung		
2004	He Was Cool	Ji Eun-sung		
2008	Fate	Kim Woo-min		
2010	A Better Tomorrow	Lee Young-choon		
2010	Ghost: In Your Arms Again	Kim Jun-ho	Japanese film	
2012	Lucid Dreaming	—N/a	Short film	
2014	Obsessed	Kim Jin-pyeong		
2015	Wonderful Nightmare	Sung-hwan		
2015	The Third Way of Love	Lin Qizheng	Chinese film	
2017	Man of Will	Kang Hyung-sik		
2018	Air Strike	An Ming Xun / An Ming He	Chinese film	
2024	Hidden Face	Sung-jin		

=== Television ===
Year	Title	Role	Notes	Ref.
1996–1999	Three Guys and Three Girls	Song Seung-heon		
1997	Beautiful Lady	Lee Min-hyuk		
1997–1998	You and I	Park Min-kyu		
1998	Winners	Jung Min-soo		
1999	Happy Together	Seo Ji-suk		
1999	Love Story	Joon-sung	episode 2: "Message"	
2000	Popcorn	Lee Young-hoon		
2000	Autumn in My Heart	Yoon Joon-seo		
2001	Law Firm	Jung Young-woong		
2003	Summer Scent	Yoo Min-woo		
2008	East of Eden	Lee Dong-chul		
2011	My Princess	Park Hae-young		
2012	Dr. Jin	Jin Hyuk		
2013	When a Man Falls in Love	Han Tae-sang		
2017	Saimdang, Memoir of Colors	Lee Gyeom		
2017	Black	Han Moo-gang (Detective) / Black (Grim Reaper #444)		
2018–2024	Player	Kang Ha-ri	Season 1–2	
2019	The Great Show	Wi Dae-han		
2020	Dinner Mate	Kim Hae-kyeong		
2021	Voice	Derek Jo	Season 4	
2023	Black Knight	Ryu Seok		
2025	My Troublesome Star	Dokgo Cheol		

=== Web shows ===
Year	Title	Role	Notes	Ref.
2022	Saturday Night Live Korea	Host	Episode 1 – Season 3	

=== Music video appearances ===
Year	Song Title	Artist	Ref.
2001	"Once Upon a Day"	Kim Bum-soo	
2005	"Sad Love Story"	Yoon Gun	
2008	"I Miss You"	SG Wannabe	

== Discography ==
=== Studio albums ===
List of studio albums, with selected details, and track listing
Title	Album details	Track listing
First Album	Released: December 7, 2004; Label: ESJ Entertainment	Track listing: 1. I love you 2. 널 지울때까지; 3. 그 모든 눈물(Take 1); 4. Miss Flower; 5. 혼 6. 그 모든 눈물(Take 2); 7. 그래요, 그렇다고, 그렇게; 8. 외사랑; 9. Playin' Playin'; 10. I love you (instrumental); 11. 그 모든 눈물 (instrumental)

=== Singles ===
==== Soundtrack appearances ====
List of singles, with year, and album
Title	Year	Album
"Even After Ten Years" (십년이 지나도)	2005	Sad Love Story OST
"For You" (그대를)	2005	Sad Love Story OST
"As Time Goes By" (세월이 가면)	2008	East of Eden OST
"Last Love" (마지막 사랑)	2012	Dr. Jin OST

== Accolades ==
=== Awards and nominations ===
Name of the award ceremony, year presented, category, nominee of the award, and the result of the nomination
Award ceremony	Year	Category	Nominee / Work	Result	Ref.
Andre Kim Best Star Awards	2009	Male Star Award	Song Seung-heon	Won	
Baeksang Arts Awards	1998	Most Popular Actor – Television	You and I	Won	
Baeksang Arts Awards	2009	Best Actor – Television	East of Eden	Nominated	
Blue Dragon Film Awards	1999	Best New Actor	Calla	Nominated	
Blue Dragon Film Awards	2014	Popular Star Award	Obsessed	Won	
China Cosmopolitan Beauty Awards	2012	Asia's Most Charming Artist	Song Seung-heon	Won	
KBS Drama Awards	2000	Top Excellence Award, Actor	Autumn in My Heart	Nominated	
KBS Drama Awards	2000	Popularity Award	Autumn in My Heart	Won	
KBS Drama Awards	2000	Photogenic Award	Autumn in My Heart	Won	
KBS Drama Awards	2003	Netizen Award, Actor	Summer Scent	Nominated	
KBS Drama Awards	2003	Best Couple Award	Song Seung-heon with Son Ye-jin; Summer Scent	Nominated	
KCA Consumer Day Awards	2019	Best Drama Actor	Player	Won	
KMTV	1997	Best New Actor	Song Seung-heon	Won	
Korean Culture and Entertainment Awards	2009	Grand Prize (Daesang) in a TV Drama	East of Eden	Won	
MBC Drama Awards	2008	Grand Prize (Daesang)	East of Eden	Won	
MBC Drama Awards	2008	Top Excellence Award, Actor	East of Eden	Nominated	
MBC Drama Awards	2008	Popularity Award, Actor	East of Eden	Won	
MBC Drama Awards	2008	Best Couple Award	Song Seung-heon with Lee Yeon-hee; East of Eden	Won	
MBC Drama Awards	2011	Top Excellence Award, Actor in a Miniseries	My Princess	Nominated	
MBC Drama Awards	2011	Popularity Award, Actor	My Princess	Nominated	
MBC Drama Awards	2011	Best Couple Award	Song Seung-heon with Kim Tae-hee; My Princess	Nominated	
MBC Drama Awards	2012	Top Excellence Award, Actor in a Miniseries	Dr. Jin	Nominated	
MBC Drama Awards	2012	Popularity Award, Actor	Dr. Jin	Nominated	
MBC Drama Awards	2013	Top Excellence Award, Actor in a Miniseries	When a Man Falls in Love	Nominated	
MBC Drama Awards	2013	Popularity Award, Actor	When a Man Falls in Love	Nominated	
MBC Drama Awards	2013	Best Couple Award	Song Seung-heon with Shin Se-kyung; When a Man Falls in Love	Nominated	
MBC Drama Awards	2020	Top Excellence Award, Actor in a Monday-Tuesday Miniseries / Short Drama	Dinner Mate	Nominated	
MBC Drama Awards	2020	Best Couple Award	Song Seung-heon with Seo Ji-hye; Dinner Mate	Nominated	
Ministry of Culture, Sports and Tourism Content Industry Awards	2010	Distinguished Hallyu Entertainer Award of Merit (co-winner with Girls' Generation)	Song Seung-heon	Won	
SBS Drama Awards	1998	Popularity Award, Actor	Winners	Won	
SBS Drama Awards	1999	Netizen Popularity Award	Happy Together	Won	
SBS Drama Awards	1999	Top 10 Stars	Happy Together	Won	
SBS Drama Awards	2001	Excellence Award, Actor in a Drama Special	Law Firm	Nominated	
SBS Drama Awards	2001	Top 10 Stars	Law Firm	Won	
SBS Drama Awards	2017	Top Excellence Award, Actor in a Wednesday-Thursday Drama	Saimdang, Memoir of Colors	Nominated	
Seoul International Drama Awards	2011	Outstanding Korean Actor	My Princess	Nominated	
Seoul International Drama Awards	2021	Outstanding Korean Actor	Dinner Mate	Nominated	
Style Icon Asia	2016	Top 10 Style Icons	Song Seung-heon	Won	

=== State honors ===
Name of the organization, year presented, and the award given
Organization	Year	Award	Ref.
Taxpayers' Day	2010	Exemplary Taxpayer Citation	
Taxpayers' Day	2015	Presidential Commendation	
