= Chagirok =

Late 18th-century Korean memoir

- Hangul: 자기록
- Hanja: 自記錄
- RR: Jagirok
- MR: Chagirok

Chagirok (Korean: 자기록; Hanja: 自記錄) is a memoir written in hangul, the Korean alphabet, in the late 18th century by Lady Cho of Pungyang Cho clan (풍양 조씨, 豊壤 趙氏; 1772–1815), a noblewoman from the Joseon Dynasty. This memoir consists of a preface, which states the purpose of her writing; a body that depicts her childhood as well as her husband's fight against illness and death; an epilogue written after the death of her father and her young brother (whom she adopted as her own son); funeral orations written by relatives after her husband's death; and her elder sister's afterword on transcribing the book. Among these, the preface and body were written in 1792; the epilogue, in 1805. For other sections of the book, it is unclear when they were written.

== Authorship ==
Lady Cho was born into the Pungyang Cho clan as the second daughter of Cho Kam (조감; 趙𣊟; 1744–1804) and Lady Ha of the Jinju Ha clan (진주 하씨, 晋州 河氏), who was a daughter of Ha Myŏngsang (하명상; 河命祥). Lady Cho later married Kim Kihwa (김기화; 金基和; 1772–1791). The Pungyang Cho clan was a prestigious clan during the late Joseon Dynasty. However, her paternal grandfather was a concubine’s son, but despite that, her father Cho Kam passed a high-level military examination and served as a district magistrate. Her husband Kim Kihwa's great grandfather passed a high-level military examination and served as a district magistrate, but his grandfather and father did not hold civil posts. Thus, the clans of her father and mother were both military clans who had lived in Seoul for generations. As of Lady Cho, there is nothing known about her, except for what is written in her memoir.

== Plot ==
Chagirok describes the author’s own childhood; her marriage and the illness and death of her husband; and her life afterward. Regarding her childhood, even though she mentions her father and elder sister, she mostly talks about her mother. She depicts in great detail how her mother had become weak after a series of childbirths and eventually passed away as a result.

Her childhood story is followed by the story of her marriage, mostly the illness and death of her husband Kim Kihwa, who was of the same age with her. She illustrates the cause of his illness, his suffering and treatment, the aggravation of his illness, her attempt to prick herself and shed blood, her suicidal thoughts, her husband’s funeral, and her life afterward.

== Features and significance ==
Chagirok is significant in that it is a rare autobiography of a traditional Korean woman. Even though her stories mostly revolve around her family (e.g. mother and husband) rather than “I,” she reflects on herself through her relationships with other family members. In this regard, Chagirok is comparable with proses that record a woman's life, such as Hanjungnok (閑中錄; A Record of Sorrowful Days), and gasa (a type of poetry popular during the Joseon Dynasty) that relates women's lives.

This memoir has a unique woman's voice that is not present in biographies of exemplary women written in the late Joseon period. At the time, many male authors wrote about devoted women who hurt their body to save their husbands in times of crisis or who killed themselves following the deaths of their husbands. However, these works did not reflect women's own positions. Chagirok is an important work of literature as it clearly shows a woman's voice.

Furthermore, Chagirok serves as historical records of aristocratic family culture in Seoul during the late 18th century. The narration of her life stories naturally reveals the culture of the time, such as the marriage customs of aristocratic families and how people treated illness. In particular, this memoir provides detailed accounts of her husband's illness and treatment, thereby serving as a clinical report.

== Other ==
The Korean drama Saimdang, Memoir of Colors was inspired by Chagirok.

== Texts ==
The only surviving transcribed copy of Chagirok is housed in the National Library of Korea. It is presumed that this is not the original manuscript written by Lady Cho of the Pungyang Cho clan but a copy transcribed by her elder sister. It was first introduced to academia in 2001 by Korean classical literature scholar Park Ok-ju.
