= Trans-Siberian Pathfinders =

2019 South Korean television variety show

- Promotional poster
- Hangul: 시베리아 선발대
- Hanja: 시베리아 先發隊
- Lit.: Siberian Advance Party
- RR: Siberia seonbaldae
- MR: Siberia sŏnbaltae
- Genre: Reality show; Variety show; Adventure; Comedy; Travel documentary
- Directed by: Choe Yun-hui; Lee Chan-Hyeon; Lee Sin-ji
- Starring: (Various actors)
- Country of origin: South Korea
- Original language: Korean
- No. of episodes: 9

Production
- Producer: Jung Jong-yeon
- Production location: Russia
- Running time: 80 minutes per episode

Original release
- Network: tvN
- Release: September 26 – November 21, 2019

Trans-Siberian Pathfinders (Korean: 시베리아 선발대) is a South Korean variety show. The show broadcast from September 26 to November 21, 2019 on Thursday 11 pm (KST).

== Synopsis ==
Five actors, who are good friends, take the Trans-Siberian Railway train to travel from Vladivostok to Moscow, Russia. The train will pass through a total of 126 stations including Khabarovsk, Belogorsk, Skovorodino, Mariinsk, Chernyshevsk, Ulan-Ude, Omsk, Tyumen, Balezino and Kirov.

== Airtime ==
Airdate	Broadcast Start Time (KST)
September 26 – November 21, 2019	Thursdays at 11 pm

== Cast ==
Name	Role	Episode	Notes
Lee Sun-kyun	Captain	1 – 9	
Kim Nam-gil	Vice Captain	1 – 9	
Ko Kyu-pil	Treasurer	1 – 9	
Kim Min-sik	Member	1 – 9	
Lee Sang-yeob	Member	4 – 9	

== List of episode and ratings ==
- In this table, the blue numbers represent the lowest ratings and the red numbers represent the highest ratings.

Ep.	Original broadcast date	Title	Average audience share (AGB Nielsen)			
Ep.	Original broadcast date	Title	Nationwide	Ranking		Seoul
Ep.	Original broadcast date	Title	Nationwide	All programs	Variety show	Seoul
1	September 26, 2019	Day 1	2.102%	3	2	2.625%
2	October 3, 2019	Days 1–2	2.994%	2	1	3.110%
3	October 10, 2019	Days 3–4	2.815%	3	1	3.050%
4	October 17, 2019	Days 4–5	2.622%	2	2	3.332%
5	October 24, 2019	Days 5–7	2.173%	3	2	2.725%
6	October 31, 2019	Days 7–9	2.704%	3	2	3.383%
7	November 7, 2019	Days 9–10	2.616%	2	1	2.999%
8	November 14, 2019	Days 10–12	2.557%	3	1	3.076%
9	November 21, 2019	Day 12 — End of Journey	2.461%	1	1	2.903%
Average			2.560%			3.022%
