= Anda (singer) =

South Korean singer (born 1991)

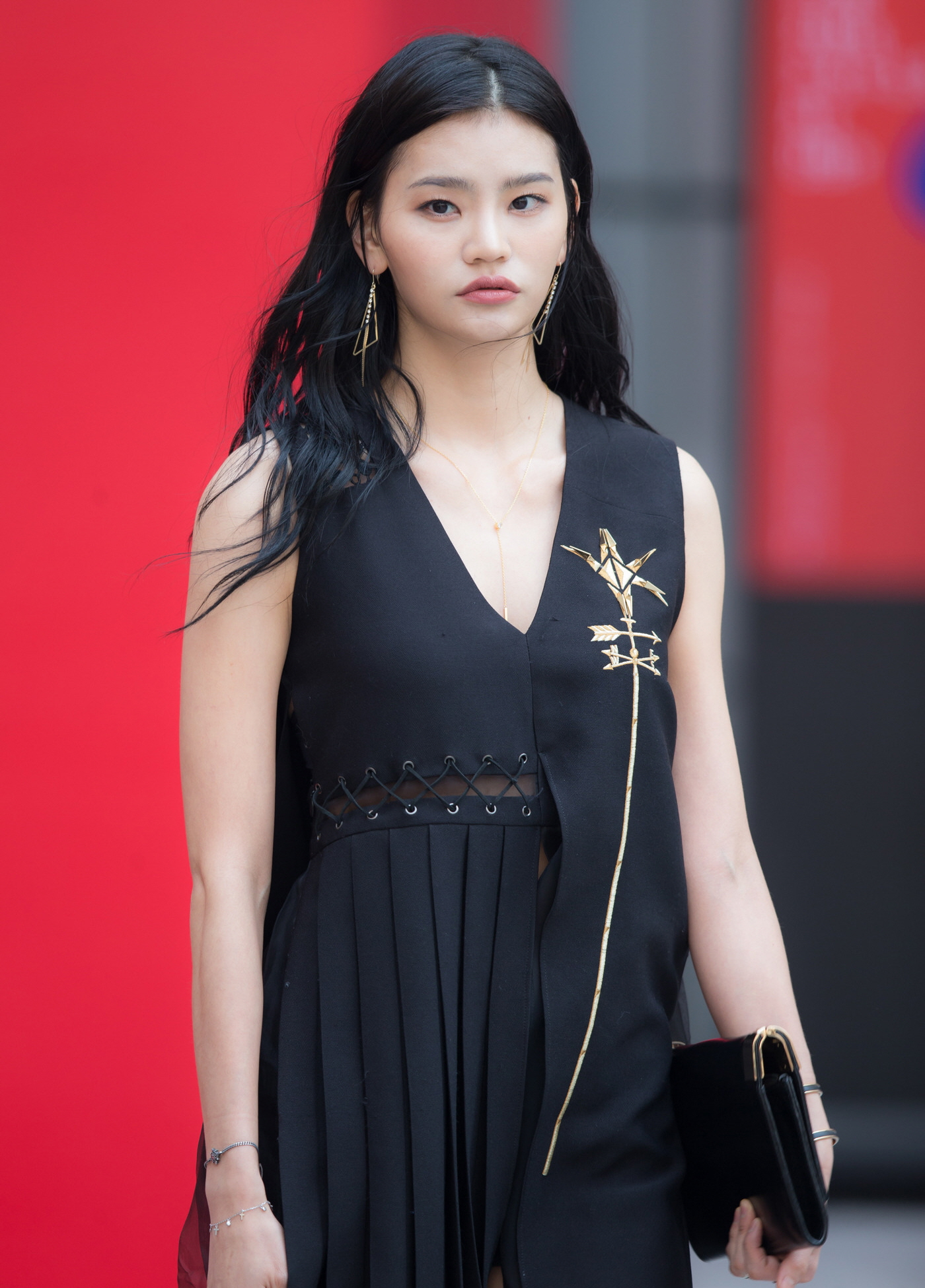
- Anda in March 2016
- Born: Won Min-ji; February 5, 1991 (age 35); Seoul, South Korea
- Other name: Andamiro
- Education: Sungkyunkwan University
- Occupations: Singer; songwriter
- Agents: ESteem; Sublime
- Spouse: Unknown (m. 2023)
- Children: 1
- Musical career
- Genre: K-pop
- Instrument: Vocals
- Years active: 2012–present
- Labels: Trophy; Amoeba Culture; YGX; THE EYE

Korean name
- Hangul: 원민지
- Hanja: 元敏智
- RR: Won Minji
- MR: Wŏn Minji

Stage name
- Hangul: 안다
- RR: Anda
- MR: Anda

Won Min-ji (Korean: 원민지; born February 5, 1991), better known by her stage name Anda (안다) and formerly Andamiro (안다미로), is a South Korean singer and songwriter. She debuted in 2012.

== Life and career ==
=== Early life ===
From a young age, Anda wanted to become a singer.

Initially, Anda failed the entrance examination for university. The following year, she tried again and passed the entrance examination for the Performing Arts Department at Sungkyunkwan University.

=== 2012: Debut ===
In 2012, Anda debuted as Andamiro under Trophy Entertainment with the dance single "Don't Ask" featuring Yang Dong-geun. It earned her the nickname, "Korea's Lady Gaga".

=== 2015: Comeback with "Mastering", "It's Goin' Down" and "Touch" ===
In 2015, Anda released a dance single called "Mastering" under Emperor Entertainment Korea. "Mastering" is a medium-tempo song with an EDM beat and an urban R&B style produced by Choi Joon-young.

"It's Goin' Down" is a hip-hop genre song and is a collaboration with The Quiett.

In June, Anda released the single "Touch" and the music video was inspired by Fiona Apple's music video for her song "Criminal".

=== 2017–present: Label changes and "What You Waiting For" ===
In August 2017, Anda signed an exclusive contract with Esteem Entertainment before eventually signing to YG Entertainment's subsidiary YGX, in July 2018.

On March 6, 2019, Anda released her first digital single and also the first single under YGX titled "What You Waiting For", on which she collaborated with YG Entertainment's producer R.Tee.

On December 31, 2021, Anda announced that she departed YG Entertainment and was planning to find a new label. A few days later, it was announced that she signed with Sublime Artist Agency.

On October 28, 2024, THE EYE Entertainment announced that Anda had joined the company.

== Personal life ==
On May 3, 2024, Anda made an announcement on Instagram, revealing she married the previous winter and was expecting a child. The singer has been out of the limelight ever since she parted ways with YG Entertainment subsidiary YGX. On June 10, 2024, Anda announced via Instagram that she gave birth to a son on June 4.

== Discography ==
=== Extended plays ===
Title	Album details	Peak positions
Title	Album details	KOR
Hypnotize	Released: September 20, 2012; Label: Trophy Entertainment; Formats: CD, digital download; Track listing: 1. Hypnotize; 2. Fever; 3. I Don't Care Feat. Dani B. & Jonathan Carey; 4. Good Luck To You; 5. Dr. Feelgood (주치의); 6. Don't Ask (말고) Feat. YDG; 7. Hypnotize (English Ver.); 8. Hypnotize (Areia Balkan Ver.); 9. Hypnotize (Club Extended Mix Ver.); 10. Hypnotize (Club Extended Mix English Ver.)	75
Do Worry Be Happy (with Primary)	Released: April 3, 2018; Label: Amoeba Culture; Formats: CD, digital download; Track listing: 1. The open boat Feat. colde 2. Zeppelin; 3. Dressroom; 4. Moonlight (월명야 月明夜) feat. Xin Seha	—
"—" denotes releases that did not chart or were not released in that region.

=== Singles ===
Title	Year	Peak positions	Album
Title	Year	KOR	Album
As lead artist
"Don't Ask" (말고) (as Andamiro) (feat. YDG)	2012	—	Hypnotize
"Hypnotize (Spanish Ver.)" (as Andamiro)	2013	—	Non-album singles
"Waiting" (as Andamiro) (feat. Double K)	2013	—	Non-album singles
"Mastering" (S대는 갔을텐데)	2015	—	Non-album singles
"It's Goin' Down" (with The Quiett)	2015	—	Non-album singles
"Touch"	2015	—	Non-album singles
"Taxi"	2016	—	Non-album singles
"Like Family" (가족같은)	2016	—	Non-album singles
"Dressroom" (with Primary)	2018	—	Do Worry Be Happy
"Zeppelin" (with Primary)	2018	—	Do Worry Be Happy
"The open boat" (with Primary) (feat. Colde)	2018	—	Do Worry Be Happy
"Moonlight" (월명야 (月明夜)) (with Primary) (feat. Xin Seha)	2018	—	Do Worry Be Happy
"What You Waiting For" (뭘기다리고있어) (with R. Tee)	2019	—	Non-album singles
"Dawn"	2024	—	Non-album singles
"—" denotes releases that did not chart or were not released in that region.

=== Soundtrack appearances ===
Title	Year	Peak chart positions		Album
Title	Year	KOR	KOR Hot.	Album
"Nobody Knows" (아무도 모르게)	2017	—	—	Saimdang, Memoir of Colors OST Part 9
"—" denotes releases that did not chart or were not released in that region.

== Filmography ==
=== Television series ===
Year	Title	Role
2017	Saimdang, Memoir of Colors	Anna

=== Television shows ===
Year	Title	Role	Notes
2022	Artistock Game	Contestant	failed to Top 20

=== Video appearances ===
Year	Title	Notes
2015	MAXIM Korea	Magazine Photoshoot
2015	Glance TV	ICONIC LIVE
