= Calla (film) =

- Film poster
- Hangul: 카라
- RR: Kara
- MR: K'ara
- Directed by: Song Hae-sung
- Written by: Lee Sun-an
- Produced by: Choi Seung-hyuk; Kim Ho-hyeon
- Starring: Song Seung-heon; Kim Hee-sun
- Cinematography: Byun Hee-sung
- Edited by: Park Gok-ji
- Music by: Chun Dong-suk
- Distributed by: 20th Century Fox
- Release date: September 18, 1999
- Running time: 105 minutes
- Country: South Korea
- Language: Korean

Calla (Korean: 카라; RR: Kara) is a 1999 South Korean romance film about a man who travels back in time to save the girl he loves from getting killed. Directed by Song Hae-sung, it stars Song Seung-heon and Kim Hee-sun.

== Plot ==
Every morning, Sun-woo receives a calla lily with a musical note attached to it, and he wants to find out who his secret admirer is. One day he meets the beautiful Ji-hee on the bus and connects her with the daily anonymous gift when he notices the same music from the musical note coming from the flower shop she works at. He falls in love with her at first sight, thinking she is the one who is sending him flowers. Wanting to confess his feelings for her, he asks her out on a date at a local hotel, and she agrees. At the hotel, though, he arrives to find Ji-hee taken hostage, and, to his horror, tragically murdered before his eyes.

Three years later, Sun-woo is soon to be married, but he is haunted by the memories of Ji-hee. His desperate wish to revive her magically comes true whereby time is turned back to the day of the fateful date at the hotel. Seeking a chance to save her life, Sun-woo is given 24 hours to turn things around. Through this process Sun-woo realizes that it was Ji-hee's friend Soo-jin and not Ji-hee who sent the calla lilies three years ago. With this, he is transported back to the present, to begin the quest for his true love, Soo-jin.

== Cast ==
- Song Seung-heon as Kim Sun-woo
- Kim Hee-sun as Kang Ji-hee
- Kim Hyun-joo as Yoon Soo-jin
- Choi Cheol-ho as Jung Min-wook
- Shin Cheol-jin as Mr. Yeong
- Go Joo-hee as Yoon Mi-ra
- Kim Ho-jin as Kim Byung-soo
- Jo Jae-gook as Deputy Ma
