= Saimdang, Memoir of Colors =

2017 South Korean television series

- Promotional poster
- Also known as: Saimdang, the Herstory
- Hangul: 사임당, 빛의 일기
- Lit.: Saimdang, Light's Diary
- RR: Saimdang, bichui ilgi
- MR: Saimdang, pich'ŭi ilgi
- Genre: Historical; Fantasy; Romance
- Created by: Lee Yong-suk (SBS)
- Written by: Park Eun-ryung
- Directed by: Yoon Sang-ho
- Starring: Lee Young-ae; Song Seung-heon
- Music by: Song Byung-joon; Ryu Young-min
- Country of origin: South Korea
- Original language: Korean
- No. of episodes: 30 (28 aired) (Note: Originally scheduled to air for 30 episodes, only 28 episodes are scheduled to air on SBS because of low ratings. The international broadcast remains at 30 episodes.)

Production
- Executive producers: Joo Dong-min; Kim Dong-hyun
- Producers: Song Byung-joon; Choi Jun-young; Song Jin-jung; Kim Young-bae
- Camera setup: Single-camera
- Running time: 60 minutes
- Production companies: Creative Leaders Group8 Inc.; Emperor Entertainment Korea Ltd.
- Budget: ₩22.5 billion

Original release
- Network: SBS TV
- Release: January 26 – May 4, 2017

Saimdang, Memoir of Colors (Korean: 사임당, 빛의 일기) is a South Korean drama starring Lee Young-ae in the title role as Shin Saimdang, a famous Joseon-era artist and calligrapher who lived in the early 16th century. It aired on SBS every Wednesday and Thursday at 22:00 (KST) starting January 26, 2017.

The series marks Lee's television comeback 14 years after her pan-Asia hit drama Dae Jang Geum (2003).

== Synopsis ==
A Korean university art history lecturer (Lee Young-ae) discovers the long-lost diary of a historical figure, unraveling the secret behind a recently uncovered, mysterious ancient painting as well as a look into the extraordinary life led by Shin Saimdang (also played by Lee), a renowned poet-artist in the Joseon era.

=== Present timeline ===
Seo Ji-yoon, a lecturer in art history at Hankuk University, seems to have everything she wants. She is about to finish her PhD, supervised by renowned professor Min Jung-hak, which would ultimately lead to a faculty position at the university. She also has a good family life, with supportive husband Jung Min-seok, a wealthy businessman, and mother-in-law Kim Jung-hae. For her PhD thesis, she is assigned to research a recently discovered painting Geumgangsando by An Gyeon, scheduled to be displayed as national treasure under the auspices of Min Jung-hak. However, Ji-yoon's discoveries seem to doubt the authenticity of the painting. At a conference, a student named Han Sang-hyun challenges her on that authenticity question, which Ji-yoon deflected, citing she needs time to ensure its authenticity.

Ji-yoon's answer casts doubt on the art world, humiliating Min Jung-hak, who opts to quickly sabotage her career path in retaliation. At a conference in Bologna, Italy, Prof. Min devises a scheme to cite her for disciplinary action, terminating her position at the university. As bad as Ji-yoon's situation is, her life continues to crumble, when her husband goes into hiding, amassing unpaid debts as a result of a competitor's illegal business maneuvers in a desperate measure for his business to survive. Reeling from her personal and professional life crises, serendipity comes into play on the roads of Italy when Ji-yoon stumbles upon a diary mentioning the Geumgangsando painting, leading her to discover the painting of Shin Saimdang by accident. The diary also sheds light about Saimdang, who not only strongly resembles Ji-yoon but seems to be intricately linked to her. Ji-yoon starts to fight an uphill battle to clear her name and prove her prowess by finding the real Geumgangsando painting, while also struggling with financial hardship and continual pressure from Min Jung-hak to prevent her from succeeding.

=== Past timeline ===
The story begins 500 years ago in the Joseon era. At that time, despite her youth, Shin Saimdang quickly gains a reputation as a talented artist yet notoriously daring girl, going as far as climbing walls to sneak into other people's houses. She is the second daughter of Shin Myung-hwa, a Confucian scholar who is loyal to King Jungjong. The King is portrayed as paranoid about losing his throne, and losing control of government to factions.

Saimdang meets and falls in love with Lee Gyeom, a member of the royal family, while enjoying the life of a commoner and an artist as well. Their love quickly blossoms, ultimately with Lee Gyeom asking Shin Myung-hwa for his daughter's hand in marriage. However, through a series of mishaps, both by the King and the main antagonists Min Chi-Hyung (a corrupt merchant) and Choi Wheiumdang (originally a jealous tavern girl, whose affections are ignored by Lee Gyeom), results in Shin Myung-hwa being executed by the King and Saimdang marrying a simple-minded scholar named Lee Won-su. Saimdang's marriage puts Lee Gyeom in despair, storming away to ultimately live a wayward life for 20 years, rejecting numerous requests of marriage from the royal family.

20 years later, Saimdang, now a mother of four (among them are Lee Mae-chang, later become a talented artist, and Lee Hyun-ryong, a child prodigy later becoming an influential scholar), moves to Hanyang with her family. However, her husband, being a gullible scholar who could not pass the national exam for 20 years, is scammed, leaving her to spend all her savings to buy a decrepit house. In Hanyang, she eventually meets her first love, Lee Gyeom, now known as Lord Uiseong. She denies her old feelings, claiming she has forgotten about them, but Gyeom has not. He finally settles in Hanyang, opening the "Bi-ikdang (Jian) Art Center", while also secretly investigating Min Chi-Hyung at the request of the King. Min Chi-Hyung is now a high-ranking, but corrupt official who married Choi Wheiumdang, now also an artist and head of the mother's organization at the prestigious Jungbu School.

To survive through financial hardship, Saimdang gathers a bunch of homeless and starving drifters to open a paper mill, with the ultimate goal of producing Goryeo paper, a famous high-quality paper whose formula has been lost. Despite having to raise a family and working tirelessly to make ends meet, Saimdang revives her dormant artistic talents, becoming a renowned painter. Eventually, Saimdang and her group of drifters are able to recreate the formula for the lost Goryeo paper, making her and the drifters wealthy. Min Chi-Hyung is exiled for his numerous crimes, with Choi Wheiumdang having to find a way to rescue her husband.

Two years later, things have gone south. Despite having amassed great wealth, Saimdang's marriage is falling apart, both from her husband having an affair and her sole focus on painting. Lee Gyeom, after travelling the world, returns to Hanyang, only to find that King Jungjong now distrusts him. After his wife stages a scheme to rescue Princess Jeongsun, Min Chi-Hyung is set free, but now winds up living a commoner's life as former officers scorn him. Things escalate when Saimdang offers to draw the King's portrait, who recognises her to be the daughter of the deceased Shin Myung-Hwa. He finally orders Min Chi-Hyung to secretly kill Saimdang and Lee Gyeom; however, Min Chi-Hyung himself is killed in the process. Lee Gyeom then confronts King Jungjong almost killing him, but chooses to flee instead. Lee Gyeom heads off to Mount Geumgang to join Saimdang as she has gone there to paint, something she has wished to do since childhood. He meets up with Saimdang, fulfilling their dream of drawing the Geumgangsando together. Saimdang finally confesses her love for Lee Gyeom, but chooses not to run away with him for the sake of not abandoning her children.

=== Meeting between Ji-yoon and Saimdang ===
Lee Gyeom finally turns himself in and accepts the death penalty. Saimdang, in despair, has a strange vision.

Meanwhile, in present timeline, Seo Ji-yoon feels strange things about the portrait of Saimdang. It seems like they are connected in some way. Finally, in an accident, Seo Ji-yoon and Saimdang meet in an undetermined world. Ji-yoon reveals to Saimdang that Lee Gyeom managed to stay alive and escaped to Italy, which encourages Saimdang to stage an assault to rescue him. En route to execution, a group of Lord Uiseong's supporters confront the royal guards, attempting to break Lee Gyeom free. The head of the royal guards, who is fond of Uiseong and disagreed with the King's execution order, lets the supporters go ahead and free him. As there could be no excuse for this action, the guard chooses to commit suicide. After a tearful farewell to Saimdang, Lee Gyeom then heads to a boat, starting a long voyage that ultimately leads him to settle in Bologna, Italy.

Lee Gyeom keeps his artistic life in Italy while living in a manor house called "Siesta di Luna" (a name inspired by one of Saimdang's quotes about the Moon). Ji-yoon once again visits Siesta di Luna, and can envision Saimdang and Lee Gyeom finally together.

== Cast ==
=== Main ===
- Lee Young-ae as Shin Saimdang / Seo Ji-Yoon
  - Park Hye-su as teen Shin Saimdang

A Joseon artist, calligrapher and philosopher

- Song Seung-heon as Lee Gyum
  - Yang Se-jong as young Lee Gyum

Saimdang's lover; an aristocrat and painter with a carefree spirit

=== Supporting ===
==== Past ====
- Oh Yoon-ah as Whieumdang Choi
  - Yoon Ye-joo as young Whieumdang Choi
- Choi Chul-ho as Min Chi-hyung, Whieumdang Choi's husband
- Choi Jong-hwan as King Jungjong
- Yoon Suk-hwa as Queen Dangyeong (known as "Deposed Queen Shin"; Jungjong's 1st Queen Consort)
- Yoon Da-hoon as Lee Won-soo, Saimdang's husband
- Shin Soo-yeon as Yi Mae-chang
- Jung Joon-won as Lee Hyun-rong, Saimdang's son
- Choi Il-hwa as Shin Myung-hwa (Saimdang's father)
- Jang Seo-kyung as Hyang-yi
- Noh Young-hak as Crown Prince Lee Ho
- Park Ji-hyun as Lee-yun
- Lee Joo-yeon as Princess Jung-soon
- Lee Kyung-jin as Lady Lee (Saimdang's mother)
- Jung Ah-in as Whieumdang Choi's helper
- Park Jung-hak as Escort warrior

==== Present ====
- Yang Se-jong as Han Sang-hyun
- Choi Jong-hwan as Min Jung-hak, Professor
- Kim Hae-sook as Kim Jung-hee, Seo Ji-yoon's mother-in-law
- Kim Dae-gon as Jung-soo
- Lee Hae-young as Jung Min-seok, Seo Ji-yoon's husband
- Shin Cheol-jin as Min-woo
- Lee Tae-woo as Jung Eun-soo, Seo Ji-yoon's son
- Park Jun-myun as Ko Hye-jung, Seo Ji-yoon's friend
- Kim Young-joon as Teacher assistant Nam
- Kim Mi-kyung as Director Seon
- Song Min-hyung as CEO Heo
- Anda as Anna

=== Extended ===
- Hong Seok-cheon as Mong Ryong
- Choi Seung-hoon as Min Ji-seong
- Seol Jung-hwan
- Song Joon-hee
- Kwak Ji-hye as Yoo Bin
- Kim Min-hee

== Production ==
According to writer Park Eun-ryung, the drama was inspired by the Joseon Dynasty book Chagirok.

The drama was first announced in March 2015 with Lee Young-ae cast in the titular role of Saimdang marking her return to acting after a 10-year hiatus since the 2005 film Sympathy for Lady Vengeance, and her first television role since the 2003 hit Dae Jang Geum. Song Seung-heon was cast as Saimdang's fictional love interest in July 2015.

The first script reading took place on August 4, 2015, at SBS Ilsan Production Center in Tanhyun, South Korea with filming beginning August 10, 2015 and finished June 4, 2016. It was originally scheduled to air simultaneously in South Korea and China in the later half of 2016, but was delayed to January 2017 due to conflict over the terminal high-altitude area defense (THAAD) system between the two countries.

== Original soundtrack ==
Saimdang, Memoir of Colors Original Soundtrack

Soundtrack album by Various Artists
- Genre: Soundtrack
- Labels: Emperor Entertainment Korea; LOEN Entertainment
- Producers: Choi Joon-young (executive); Kim Dong-wook (HowL) (co-executive)

=== Part 1 ===
No.	Title	Lyrics	Music	Artist	Length
1.	"Back in the Day" (그때 그날 우리)	Kim Dong-wook (HowL); Park Geun-chul	Kim Dong-wook (HowL); Park Geun-chul; Jung Soo-min	Hyemi (Fiestar)	4:50
2.	"Back in the Day (Inst.)" (그때 그날 우리)		Kim Dong-wook (HowL); Park Geun-chul; Jung Soo-min		4:50
Total length:					9:40

=== Part 2 ===
No.	Title	Lyrics	Music	Artist	Length
1.	"Kite" (연)	Kim Yoon-ah	Song Byung-jun; Ryu Young-min; CLUMSY; Kim Ji-soo	Kim Yoon-ah (Jaurim)	3:58
2.	"Kite (Inst.)" (연)		Song Byung-jun; Ryu Young-min; CLUMSY; Kim Ji-soo		3:58
Total length:					7:56

=== Part 3 ===
No.	Title	Lyrics	Music	Artist	Length
1.	"Close To You" (너에게 간다)	Kim Dong-wook (HowL); Park Geun-chul; Jung Soo-min	Kim Dong-wook (HowL); Park Geun-chul; Jung Soo-min	The One	4:23
2.	"Close To You (Inst.)" (너에게 간다)		Kim Dong-wook (HowL); Park Geun-chul; Jung Soo-min		4:23
Total length:					8:46

=== Part 4 ===
No.	Title	Lyrics	Music	Artist	Length
1.	"Whenever, Wherever" (언제든, 어디라도)	Kim Dong-wook (HowL)	Ha Jung-ho; Han Tae-soo	LYn	4:29
2.	"Whenever, Wherever (Inst.)" (언제든, 어디라도)		Ha Jung-ho; Han Tae-soo		4:29
Total length:					8:58

=== Part 5 ===
No.	Title	Lyrics	Music	Artist	Length
1.	"Why" (왜 그댈)	Kim Dong-wook (HowL)	Kim Ji-soo	Zia	4:13
2.	"Why (Inst.)" (왜 그댈)		Kim Ji-soo		4:13
Total length:					8:26

=== Part 6 ===
No.	Title	Lyrics	Music	Artist	Length
1.	"Everlasting Love" (단 한 번의 사랑)	Kim Dong-wook (HowL)	Ha Jung-ho; Go Young-hwan	Lee Soo (MC The Max)	3:43
2.	"Everlasting Love (Inst.)" (단 한 번의 사랑)		Ha Jung-ho; Go Young-hwan		3:43
Total length:					7:26

=== Part 7 ===
No.	Title	Lyrics	Music	Artist	Length
1.	"Amnesia" (기억상실증)	Im Dong-kyun	Kim Young-sung; Im Dong-kyun; Eo Han-jung	Kim Bum-soo	3:48
2.	"Amnesia (Inst.)" (기억상실증)		Kim Young-sung; Im Dong-kyun; Eo Han-jung		3:48
Total length:					7:36

=== Part 8 ===
No.	Title	Lyrics	Music	Artist	Length
1.	"The Song Of The Star" (별의 노래)	Kim Dong-wook (HowL)	Ha Jung-ho; Go Young-hwan	Melody Day	3:39
2.	"The Song Of The Star (Inst.)" (별의 노래)		Ha Jung-ho; Go Young-hwan		3:39
Total length:					7:18

=== Part 9 ===
No.	Title	Lyrics	Music	Artist	Length
1.	"Nobody Knows" (아무도 모르게)	Shin Jae-hong	Shin Jae-hong; Shin Hyung	Anda	4:10
2.	"Nobody Knows (Inst.)" (아무도 모르게)		Shin Jae-hong; Shin Hyung		4:08
Total length:					8:08

=== Part 10 ===
No.	Title	Lyrics	Music	Artist	Length
1.	"Half"	Kim Dong-wook (HowL)	Go Young-hwan; Ha Jung-ho	Moon Hyung-seo (Kevin Moon)	3:58
2.	"Half (Inst.)"		Go Young-hwan; Ha Jung-ho		3:58
Total length:					7:56

== Reception ==
Prior to its broadcast, the series received much attention due to it being a comeback for Lee Young-ae, whose last appearance on the small screen was 14 years ago in the pan-Asia drama hit Jewel in the Palace (2003). Boasting a budget of 22.5 billion won ($20 million), Chinese rights of the series were sold to the Hong Kong-based Emperor Entertainment Korea for $267,000 per episode, surpassing the previous record set by the 2016 hit drama Descendants of the Sun. Rights have also been sold to US-based Netflix for $20,000 per episode, and in Japan for $90,000 per episode.

Despite its initial hype, extensive publicity and huge budget, Saimdang failed to capture viewers and was ultimately surpassed by its competitor in the same time slot. Factors such as its lack of fresh elements, slow plot and illogical storyline were cited as reasons for its failure. Additionally, both Lee Young-ae and Park Hye-su were criticized for their acting performance. The series was ultimately cut by two episodes due to its low ratings.

Nonetheless, the series managed to earn a net profit thanks to strong performance overseas. According to its production company, it earned 17 billion won (US$15 million) via distribution in seven countries, including in China, Japan and Taiwan. The series is the most viewed program on Taiwan's GTV, and also maintained the No. 1 and No. 2 positions on various platforms in Hong Kong, Japan, Singapore and Malaysia.

== Ratings ==
- In the table below, the blue numbers represent the lowest ratings and the red numbers represent the highest ratings.
- NR denotes that the drama did not rank in the top 20 daily programs on that date.

Ep.	Broadcast date	Average audience share			
Ep.	Broadcast date	TNmS		AGB Nielsen	
Ep.	Broadcast date	Nationwide	Seoul	Nationwide	Seoul
1	January 26, 2017	13.9% (4th)	16.0% (3rd)	16.3% (4th)	16.6% (3rd)
2	January 26, 2017	11.8% (7th)	13.4% (5th)	15.6% (5th)	16.6% (3rd)
3	February 1, 2017	10.6% (10th)	12.2% (5th)	13.0% (4th)	13.5% (4th)
4	February 2, 2017	10.2% (11th)	11.5% (6th)	12.3% (5th)	12.6% (5th)
5	February 8, 2017	8.6% (15th)	9.9% (6th)	10.7% (6th)	11.0% (5th)
6	February 9, 2017	8.7% (13th)	10.3% (7th)	12.0% (7th)	12.5% (5th)
7	February 15, 2017	7.0% (17th)	8.7% (12th)	9.7% (9th)	10.2% (5th)
8	February 16, 2017	7.8% (16th)	9.0% (14th)	10.3% (9th)	10.9% (6th)
9	February 22, 2017	7.6% (16th)	8.6% (9th)	9.8% (8th)	10.4% (5th)
10	February 23, 2017	8.3% (13th)	9.9% (7th)	10.1% (10th)	10.7% (6th)
11	March 1, 2017	7.7% (16th)	9.1% (8th)	9.6% (9th)	9.7% (8th)
12	March 2, 2017	8.4% (17th)	9.4% (8th)	10.3% (8th)	10.3% (6th)
13	March 8, 2017	7.8% (13th)	8.7% (9th)	10.3% (8th)	10.3% (6th)
14	March 9, 2017	8.4% (12th)	9.1% (8th)	10.5% (8th)	10.7% (7th)
15	March 15, 2017	8.4% (13th)	9.0% (8th)	10.4% (7th)	10.8% (5th)
16	March 16, 2017	9.3% (11th)	10.5% (6th)	10.2% (9th)	10.2% (7th)
17	March 22, 2017	8.3% (16th)	9.0% (10th)	9.4% (8th)	9.1% (6th)
18	March 23, 2017	9.0% (10th)	10.4% (5th)	10.0% (7th)	9.9% (7th)
19	March 29, 2017	8.1% (17th)	9.7% (8th)	9.0% (9th)	9.3% (7th)
20	March 30, 2017	8.2% (17th)	9.4% (9th)	9.3% (9th)	9.3% (8th)
21	April 5, 2017	8.6% (16th)	10.0% (7th)	9.4% (9th)	8.8% (10th)
22	April 6, 2017	8.7% (15th)	9.3% (11th)	9.6% (9th)	9.3% (8th)
23	April 12, 2017	7.4% (19th)	8.4% (12th)	8.5% (11th)	8.4% (10th)
24	April 19, 2017	6.0% (NR)	6.2% (NR)	6.1% (20th)	5.9% (NR)
25	April 20, 2017	7.2% (18th)	7.9% (18th)	8.3% (12th)	8.8% (11th)
26	April 26, 2017	6.4% (NR)	6.9% (18th)	7.8% (11th)	7.7% (11th)
27	April 27, 2017	7.4% (16th)	7.8% (15th)	8.4% (10th)	8.5% (9th)
28	May 4, 2017	6.8% (18th)	7.5% (12th)	8.2% (9th)	8.8% (7th)
Average		8.5%	9.6%	10.2%	10.4%

- Episode 24 was originally scheduled on April 13, 2017; however, it was pushed back due to 2017 Korean Presidential Debate.

== Awards and nominations ==
Year	Award	Category	Nominee	Result
2017	25th SBS Drama Awards	Top Excellence Award, Actor in a Wednesday–Thursday Drama	Song Seung-heon	Nominated
2017	25th SBS Drama Awards	Top Excellence Award, Actress in a Wednesday–Thursday Drama	Lee Young-ae	Nominated
2017	25th SBS Drama Awards	Excellence Award, Actress in a Wednesday–Thursday Drama	Oh Yoon-ah	Nominated
