= Ko Kyu-pil =

South Korean actor

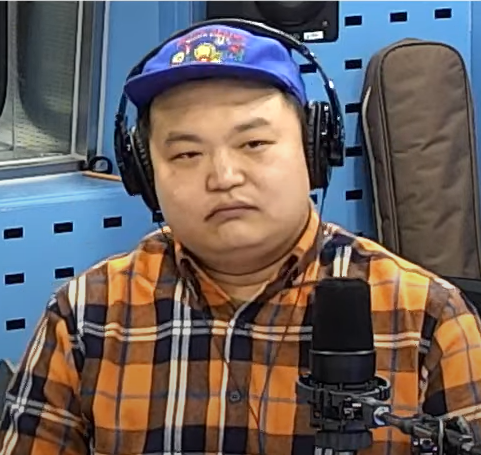
- Ko in 2019
- Born: May 2, 1982 (age 44); South Korea
- Education: Chung-Ang University; Baekje College of Arts
- Occupation: Actor
- Years active: 1993–present
- Agent: Big Boss Entertainment

Korean name
- Hangul: 고규필
- Hanja: 高圭弼
- RR: Go Gyupil
- MR: Ko Kyup'il

Ko Kyu-pil (born May 2, 1982) is a South Korean actor. He debuted in the 1993 South Korean children's film Kid Cop and has thus appeared in notable television series and films in a supporting role.

== Personal life ==
On June 16, 2023, it was confirmed that Ko is in a relationship with singer-songwriter Min Soo-yeon. On September 6, 2023, it was announced that they will marry on November 12, after nine years of dating.

== Filmography ==
=== Film ===
Year	Title	Role	Notes/Ref.
1993	Kid Cop	Sang-hoon	Main role
2003	Once Upon a Time in a Battlefield	Prince of Baekje	
2006	Gangster High	Na Sang-shik	
2008	Baby and I	Ki-seok	
2009	Mother	Ddong-ddong	
2013	Fasten Your Seatbelt	Ma Joon-gyu's manager	
2014	My Love, My Bride	Jung-jin	
2017	Real		Support role
2017	Marionette	Detective Moon	
2018	On Your Wedding Day	Gu Gong-ja	
2018	The Soul Mate	Bong-goo	
2021	The Cursed: Dead Man's Prey		
2022	Stella	Cheol-gu	Special appearance
2023	Count	Man-deok	
2023	The Roundup: No Way Out	Cho Rong-i	
2024	Tarot	Kyeong Rae	
2024	Idiot Girls and School Ghost: School Anniversary	Science Teacher	Cameo
2025	The Noisy Mansion	Ahn Gyeong-seok	
2025	The First Ride	Tai Park	Support role
TBA	Mismatch	Man-su	

=== Television series ===
Year	Title	Role	Notes/Ref.
2004	Full House		Support role
2004	Immortal Admiral Yi Sun Shin	Dol-soe	
2006	Seoul 1945	Park Chang-joo	
2007	Mackerel Run	Jang Dong-geon	
2008	The Painter of the Wind	Painter	Guest role
2014	Marriage, Not Dating		guest role, episode 13
2015	Hello Monster	Park So-young	
2015	D-Day	Yoo Myung-hyun	
2016	Moorim School: Saga of the Brave		Support role
2016	Another Miss Oh		guest role, episode 3
2016	Squad 38	Jung Ja-wang	
2016	One More Time		Guest role
2016	The Legend of the Blue Sea		Guest role, episode 9
2016	7 First Kisses		guest role, episode 7
2018–2019	Partners for Justice	Jung Sung-joo	Season 1 and 2
2018	Life on Mars	Mr. Yang	
2018	The Beauty Inside		Guest role, episode 1–2
2019	The Fiery Priest	Oh Yo-han	
2019	Mother of Mine		Guest role, episode 1
2019	Vagabond	Park Gwang-duk	
2019	Crash Landing on You	Hong Chang Shik (team manager)	
2020	The Cursed	Tak Jung-hoon	
2020	Dinner Mate	Park Jin-gyu	
2020	Backstreet Rookie		Guest role, episode 1–2
2021	Lovers of the Red Sky	Cheong Ji-gi	
2021	The King's Affection	Hong Nae-gwan	
2022	Crazy Love	Joo Jun-pal	
2022	From Now On, Showtime!	Ma Dong-cheol	
2022	Rose Mansion	Obom	
2022	Adamas	Gong Dae-chul	Cameo
2022	May It Please the Court	Do Young-soo	
2022–2023	Shadow Detective	Jang Su-saeng	Season 1–2
2023	Heartbeat	Park Dong-seop	
2024	Queen of Tears		Cameo (ep. 1–2)
2024	Tarot	Kyung-rae	
2024	Frankly Speaking (TV series)	Yoon Ji-hu	
2025	Twelve	Donyi	
2025	Heroes Next Door	Lee Yong-hee	
TBA	Knock-Off		

=== Television show ===
Year	Title	Notes
2019	Trans-Siberian Pathfinders	Cast member
2020	K-Ocean Pathfinders	Cast member
2023	Great Guide	Tour customers

=== Web series ===
Year	Title	Role	Notes	Ref.
2023	Song of the Bandits	Han Tae-ju	Netflix	
2025	Genie, Make a Wish	Sayyid	Netflix	

== Accolades ==
=== Awards and nominations ===
Year	Award	Category	Nominated work	Result	Ref.
2019	38th MBC Drama Awards	Best Supporting Cast	Partners for Justice (S2)	Nominated	
2019	27th SBS Drama Awards	Best Supporting Team	The Fiery Priest	Won	
2020	39th MBC Drama Awards	Best Supporting Actor	Kairos	Nominated	
2022	Baekje Arts University	Baekje Artists Grand Prize	—N/a	Won	
2023	Buil Film Awards	Best Supporting Actor	The Roundup: No Way Out	Nominated	
2023	Korea Drama Awards	Hot Star Award	Heartbeat	Won	
2023	Grand Bell Awards	Best Supporting Actor	The Roundup: No Way Out	Nominated	
2025	APAN Star Awards	Excellence Acting Award, actor	Genie, Make a Wish, Twelve	Won	

=== Listicles ===
Name of publisher, year listed, name of listicle, and placement
Publisher	Year	Listicle	Placement	Ref.
Joy News 24	2023	Rising Star Film Actor of the Year	3rd	
