= Kid Cop =

- Film poster
- Directed by: Lee Joon-ik
- Written by: Heo Gyeong-jin
- Produced by: Lee Joon-ik
- Starring: Kim Min-jung; Jung Tae-woo
- Cinematography: Shin Ok-hyun
- Edited by: Park Sun-duk
- Music by: Kang In-gu
- Production company: Cine World
- Release date: July 17, 1993
- Running time: 75 minutes
- Country: South Korea
- Language: Korean

Kid Cop (Korean: 키드 캅) is a 1993 South Korean children's film directed by Lee Joon-ik, starring Kim Min-jung and Jung Tae-woo. Kid Cop is sometimes referred to as the "Korean Home Alone" due to the bigger emphasis of children's roles in both movies.

== Plot ==
Junho plans to give a present to his favorite female friend, Eunsu. However, Junho's plan failed due to Hyungtae's advancement towards Eunsu. This has prompted Junho to go to a shopping mall, where Eunsu's favorite singer holds a fan meeting. The kids meet together and disturbed the shopping mall. A security guard eventually catches them. On the other hand, the robbers are planning to take over the shopping mall. while this is happening the kids are punished by the security guard, who makes the kids kneel and raise their hands. The children try to ask the security guard to let Eunsu go because she doesn’t deserve punishment. The security guard responds by yelling at them and telling them to shut up. While this is happening the robbers cover up the security camera in the mall parking garage to hide their activities, then they drive in as the gate closes. One of the security guards on duty for the cameras gets suspicious of one of the cameras and calls the security guard currently with the kids and asks him to check it out. The security guard instructs the kids to stay put saying that he will return. Once the security guard exits he encounters the robber boss and attempts to intimidate him by demanding to know what his name is. In response the robber boss beats up the security guard and has his lackey finish the job. Afterwards the robbers arrive at the elevator and tells 2 robbers to go through the stairs as it would take to long to wait for the elevator, they agree and go their separate ways. The scene then cuts to a security guard checking the premises and getting hit and chocked out by one of the robber, another security guard gets knocked out similarly by another robber, then he is sprayed with sleeping spray to keep him knocked out. Another security guard walks up a flight of stairs then is cornered by one of the robbers and is sprayed with the sleeping spray. One last security guard lingers by the vending machine and is also knocked out by a sweeping kick and a throat pin by one of the robbers. Meanwhile the kids are still in the same spot. Junho blames his father for his situation saying that he should have been there. Junho also says he loves eunsu thinking that his dad would do the same. In response eunsu asks if Junho is crazy slapping him. Junho wonders if what his dad said is wrong. Some of the kids notice that there is nobody in the halls while one of the kids begs the others to get back into their positions worried that they will be punished further. A security guard calls into the guard office containing the children getting no answer. Meanwhile the children sneak out of the office and witness a security guard being knocked out. They hurry away to another hall. One of the robbers goes across the hallway carrying the body of the security guard into the guard’s office. The elevator opens to 3 of the robbers coming out. A security hears some noise by the elevator and comes to investigate, He is then knocked out by one of the robbers. The robbers then make it to the office of the ceo and break into it. The robber boss remarks on how tasteful the ceo is. The scene cuts to a security guard reading the news in the bathroom then losing some toilet paper and having to retrieve it from the outside. The main security personnel wonders why no security guards are responding to their radios. A security guard walks into the room with a security guard’s body. He soon finds the body and asks if he is ok. When his fellow security guard doesn’t respond he try’s to call into for help. The main security personnel gets a knock at the door so he responds only to get knocked out by one of the robbers. then while the security guard in the other office attempts to get help he is also knocked out. then the robber steals a police radio and radios into the main security officer and establishes that the dirty work is finished. the robber in the main security room instructs the other robber to hurry up. The robber then makes it into a circuit room and knocks out an electrician present there, then the robber assembles a chainsaw and destroys the wires to the main circuit cutting some power specifically to the alarms. Meanwhile the kids make it into the payphone room and try’s to call the police but fails due to the outage from the destruction of wires. The kids continue to calls the police to no avail. While that is happening one of the robbers gives the green light to break open the vault. The female robber does so by blowtorching the outer layer of the door. While that is happening the kids crawl away from one of the robbers who tells the other robbers by walkie talkies that the power had been cut out. The female robber continues to blow torch the first layer of the safe open. The scene cuts back to one of the kids asking another kid if he is really thinking about eating right now the other kid says that it’s past dinner time and that he has a right to be hungry. They all bicker and eunsu asks what they are doing there and that they should find a way to escape instead. They all agree and decide to go but Junho interrupts by saying that there is a back exit they can find beyond some stairs and they decide to go that way. Meanwhile the female robber finishes breaking into the first layer of the safe. The robber boss and female robber discover that there are two layers to the safe and the female robber says that the heist may take much longer. The robber boss says that it won’t be a problem and decides to proceed. Meanwhile the kids make it up the stairs into the hallways towards the exit and unexpectedly there is a robber guarding the hall. One of the kids finally arrive and burp when he gets there alerting the robber. The kids then make it to a break room and Junho finds a vent in which the kids climb into. Meanwhile the robber gets suspicious and searches the rooms around eventually going into the break room, he then hears noises and looks around eventually looking up at the vents, then walks away. the kids then crawl away in the vents. Meanwhile the robber woman has set an electronic wired security bypass to find out the combination to the inner safe. The kids make it to the ventilation above the safe and find out the reasons the robbers are here and decides to stop them. One of the kids records the robber and whispers that he saw what they are doing and sees them. the kids the. Make it out into the break room and create a plan. Junho and eunsu are tasked to create traps in the toy section of the mall while the rest of the kids prevent the elevators from being used. Junho borrows one of the kid’s camera and puts the plan onto motion by setting up the cam in the toys area as well as other traps with eunsu. Meanwhile the female robber gets the safe open and the robber boss instructs another robber to put the money into the suitcase. Meanwhile Junho and eunsu finish setting up the traps. the suitcase is filled and is taken by the robber boss to the elevator. The female robber instructs the robber in the main security office to prepare for escape by opening the gate. Meanwhile the kids jam the elevators with a soda can and toys. The robber boss meanwhile gets impatient and presses the button multiple times to no avail. The female robber calls in to one of the robbers to check the elevators and he goes to check the elevator and finds the soda can jammed into the elevator doors and attempts to take it out. While he tries to do that the kids jam his head into the elevator doors and closes the doors on his head multiple times. Eventually they push the robber down the elevator around 5 stories to the bottom. The kids celebrate their first victory. The mob boss and robbers upstairs get impatient and decide to go to the escalator, the female robber calls into the walkie talkie to request a turn on of the escalators. The kids reground down at the toys section and prepare for battle. The robbers go down the escalator and find a remote controlled car spinning in circles and gets started by it. The mob boss demands one of the robbers to chase the controlled car. While that happens Junho points the camera at one of the kids and the kid makes fun of the robbers. The robbers get even more frightened and attempt to find and turn of the camera. The screens go blank and one of the robbers stumbles across a moving doll controlled by the kids that sings about knowing his wrongdoings. Then all of a sudden Mozart booms out of the speaks right next to him startling him. he is then started by multiple speakers playing music and all of a sudden the kids pop out and attack him with toy weapons like slingshots and toy guns. The robber boss and female robber chase after the kids but then has to split. Junho acquires a frying pan and when one of the robbers trip Junho hits the robber with a frying pan until the robber passes out. The female robber chases a different kid and demands the kid to stop. Then the kid gives the signal and another kid throws toys to the ground slipping both the female robber and the kid then the kid wraps both the robber and kid in rope, realizes his mistake and unties them. They then are chased by the female robber until one of the kids sprays the female robber with water. Another kid comes in with a bike and blocks her while she is still sprayed. Then another kid from behind sneaks up with a bat and knocks the female robber out. The robber boss catches up with Junho and eunsu and block them until the robber boss captures eunsu, then Junho climbs up a pile of toys and does a jump and headbutts the robber boss in the face. Junho and eunsu steal the suitcase and escape down the escalator. Junho then makes it to the clothing department while the robber boss still chases him. He attempts to sneak away from the robber boss but then hits a mannequin and alerts the robber boss resulting in another chase down more escalators as the female robber joins the chase. Junho then throws the suitcase at one of the robbers downstairs and rams into him. Junho then picks the suitcase back up and runs into the grocery department of the mall and continues the chase. the chase continues as the kids pass the suitcase among each other eventually making it to the emergency exit where Junho and other kid split up and run. The female robber catches up and splits up from the other robber. The robber goes into a gym area of the mall and searches. All of a sudden 2 fumbles roll from both his sides and one of the kids spray him with Pepsi. While the robber is distracted they knock him off his feet and he lands his head on a workout machine and the kids trap him while he is stuck on the machine. One of the kids takes a dumbbell and knocks him out. The kids celebrate but are soon captured by the robber boss. Meanwhile the female robber makes it to the showers of a pool room and is suddenly bombarded with showers turned on by Junho she chases Junho to the pool room and Junho throws the suitcase into the water. The female robber jumps in retraining the suitcase but is then attacked by a remote controlled boat. Then Junho throws multiple paddles boats hitting the female robber multiple times. Then eunsu jumps in and helps fasten a life preserver on the female robber who is then pulled to the side of the pool and his hit with a pool chair multiple times until she is knocked out. Junho and eunsu retrieve the suitcase shortly after. Meanwhile the robber boss is punishing the kids and interrogating them for answers on where the suitcase is. The kids are then made fun of and one of this kids has his hair ripped out by the robber boss. The police call upon mall security but there is no response so patrol cars are sent to the mall to investigate. Meanwhile Junho and eunsu make it to the theatre of the mall and hide out in the theatre because eunsu is exhausted. While they are hiding Junho gives the fish in his bag to eunsu as a gift and says that he wanted to give the gift when class ended but couldn’t. The robber boss appears and Junho and eunsu attempt to escape but are caught and thrown to the side either the robber boss attempts to get the suitcase tossed on stage. Before he is able to Junho and eunsu bite his butt and rip his pants. Junho tells eunsu to go to the upper floor and Junho shoves the robber boss away from the suitcase and grabs it for himself. They commence in a standoff and the robber boss is able to grab Junho by his legs and spins him and beats him. Eunsu makes it to the control panels and turns on lights and sounds. While she is doing that Junho rams into the robber boss’s crotch. Eunsu presses more buttons while Junho bites the robber boss’s ear. Junho is then flung off and stomped on by the robber boss. The robber boss grabs the suitcase and flees. Eunsu goes to Junho’s side and helps him up. The kids in the gym wonder how they can get out. Meanwhile the patrol car arrives and the police officer steps out and looks into the mall and sees a body inside, alarmed he goes back to his patrol car and calls for backup. Junho makes it to the parking garage just as the robber boss attempts to drive away. Junho chases the car and blocks it off with a road blocker and pushes a car while the robber boss try’s to escape resulting in the robber boss crashing into boxes. The robber boss reverses and chases Junho while he crashes another cart into his car. The robber boss crashes into another car attempting to get Junho. Junho throws a cone at the robber boss’s car but then is chased again. The crash crashes again into a sign and almost hits Junho but Misses. The. Juno runs and grabs a fire extinguisher and sprays the car windshield blinding the robber boss. The robber boss reverses and hits a car. He goes forward and hits another car. Junho then climbs onto the car the robber boss crashed into and rams the extinguisher into the windshield of the car containing the robber boss breaking the windshield which gives the robber boss a concussion finally knocking him out. The scene cuts to the outside where ambulances and police are waiting as well as the parents of the children and other people. The children come out and reunite with their parents and other relatives and they drink water from a watergun. Soon after the robbers come out broken, bruised, and battered. The female robber tells the kids she forgives them and one of the kids commands cheer. The movie ends with Junho and eunsu smiling at the camera.

== Cast ==
- Lee Jae-suk as Joon-ho
- Kim Min-jung as Eun-soo
- Jung Tae-woo as Seung-woo
- Jang Young-chul as Hyung-tae
- Ko Kyu-pil as Sang-hoon
- Dokgo Young-jae as the robber boss
- Jang Se-jin as the robber
