= Tarot (TV series) =

2024 South Korean television series

- Promotional poster
- Hangul: 타로: 일곱 장의 이야기
- Lit.: Tarot: Stories of Seven Cards
- RR: Taro: ilgop jangui iyagi
- MR: T'aro: ilgop changŭi iyagi
- Genre: Horror; Mystery; Thriller
- Written by: Kyung Min-sun
- Directed by: Choi Byung-gil
- Starring: Cho Yeo-jeong; Park Ha-sun; Kim Jin-young; Ko Kyu-pil; Seo Ji-hoon; Hahm Eun-jung; Oh Yu-jin
- Country of origin: South Korea
- Original language: Korean
- No. of episodes: 7

Production
- Production companies: Studio X+U; Woosang Film; Studio Changchang

Original release
- Network: U+ Mobile TV
- Release: July 15 – August 5, 2024

Related
- Tarot (film)

Tarot (Korean: 타로: 일곱 장의 이야기) is a 2024 South Korean horror mystery thriller television series written by Kyung Min-sun, directed by Choi Byung-gil, and starring Cho Yeo-jeong, Park Ha-sun, Kim Jin-young, Ko Kyu-pil, Seo Ji-hoon, Hahm Eun-jung, and Oh Yu-jin. The series deals with seven mystery thriller stories after receiving different tarot cards. It was released on U+ Mobile TV from July 15, to August 5, 2024, every Monday and Tuesday. It is also available for streaming on Viu in selected regions.

Tarot was the first South Korean series that officially invited to the 2024 Canneseries. Among the episodes of the series, "Santa's Visit" starring Cho was selected for the Short Form Competition.

== Synopsis ==
Tarot is about a cruel fate mystery where people who were living in reality are trapped by the curse of a twisted tarot card due to a momentary choice.

== Cast and characters ==
=== Main ===
- Cho Yeo-jeong as Ji-woo

A working mother who is raising her daughter alone.

- Park Ha-sun as Young-ji's mother

She is called "rental mom" by other parents because she lives in a rental apartment.

- Kim Jin-young as Dong-in

A veteran rider called Delivery King.

- Ko Kyu-pil as Kyung-rae

A passenger who takes a taxi late at night.

- Seo Ji-hoon as Jae-yoon

A handsome young man that has never been in a serious relationship.

- Hahm Eun-jung as Eun-mi

She is about to marry her boyfriend but is wavering.

- Oh Yu-jin as Ssunja

A famous BJ who does not hesitate to do dangerous broadcasts.

=== Supporting ===
- Lee Joo-bin as Ji-oh

She communicates with Jae-yoon through a storage box.

- Kim Seong-tae as Min-chan

A person who is gripped by anxiety that his girlfriend might leave him.

== Production ==
On January 12, 2024, Kim Jin-young was reportedly cast as the male lead for the series. Three days after, Cho Yeo-jeong was reported to appear on the series. On January 16, Studio X+U confirmed the casting lineup namely Cho and Dex together with Park Ha-sun, Ko Kyu-pil, Seo Ji-hoon, Lee Joo-bin, Kim Seong-tae, Ham Eun-jeong, and Oh Yu-jin.

== Release ==
Studio X+U confirmed that the series would premiere on July 15, 2024. It ran from July 15, to August 5, 2024, every Monday and Tuesday. It is also available to stream on Viu in selected regions.

== Reception ==
=== Critical reception ===
The series received generally positive reviews. Among the 7 episodes, the "Couple Manager" episode starring Hahm Eun-jung and Seo Ji-hoon was featured on a special episode of SBS's Access Movie World on July 13, 2024. It was also included on The Economic Times list of Korean OTT series to not miss.

=== Awards and nominations ===
Name of the award ceremony, year presented, category, nominee of the award, and the result of the nomination
Award ceremony	Year	Category	Nominee / Work	Result	Ref.
Cannes International Series Festival	2024	Short Form Competition	"Santa's Visit"	Nominated	

== Tarot film ==
Ahead of the series' release, the three episodes—"Santa's Visit", "Abandon Me", and "Going Home"—was combined to produce a single movie with the same title which was released at CGV Cinemas on June 14, 2024.
