= Tarot (2024 South Korean film) =

2024 film by Choi Byung-gil

- Theatrical release poster
- Directed by: Choi Byung-Gil (Ashbun)
- Screenplay by: Kyung Min Sun
- Starring: Cho Yeo-jeong; Dex (Kim Jin-young); Ko Kyu-pil
- Production companies: Next Entertainment World; Studio X+U; Woosang Film; Studio Changchang
- Distributed by: CJ CGV
- Release date: June 14, 2024
- Running time: 94 minutes
- Country: South Korea
- Language: Korean
- Box office: $92,700

Tarot (Korean: 타로) is a 2024 South Korean horror anthology drama mystery film written by Kyung Min Sun directed by Ashbun. It stars Cho Yeo-jeong, Park Ha-sun, Dex (Kim Jin-young), Ko Kyu-pil and Seo Ji-hoon. The film is about a story of people who being trapped in the curse of tarot cards twisted by a moment's choice. The film is a combination of the three short stories in Tarot TV series.

== Plot ==
=== Santa's Visit ===
Ji-woo, a single mother, is compelled to work a night shift at a convenience store on Christmas Eve, leaving her young daughter alone at home. Before departing, she discovers the Wheel of Fortune tarot card, symbolizing change and destiny.

As the night progresses, Ji-woo receives unsettling messages and video calls from her daughter, who reports hearing noises and seeing shadows moving in the house. The situation escalates when Ji-woo witnesses, through a video call, a shadowy figure lurking behind her daughter.

Desperate, Ji-woo rushes home, only to find the house in disarray and her daughter missing. Clues lead her to the attic, where she confronts a monstrous entity resembling a twisted version of Santa Claus, representing the dark side of the holiday spirit. The creature embodies the consequences of neglect and the perversion of joy into horror.

In a climactic struggle, Ji-woo confronts the entity, facing her deepest fears and guilt. She manages to rescue her daughter, but the experience leaves them both traumatized, highlighting the thin line between everyday life and lurking horror.

=== Going Home ===
Kyung-rae, a businessman entangled in an extramarital affair, finds himself in a taxi late at night after a heated argument with his mistress. He discovers the Fool tarot card in the taxi, symbolizing new beginnings and naivety.

The taxi ride takes a sinister turn as the driver deviates from the usual route, leading Kyung-rae into a desolate area. The atmosphere becomes increasingly tense, with the driver making cryptic comments and the radio emitting distorted voices.

Paranoia grips Kyung-rae, and he becomes convinced that the driver is a serial killer. In a panic, he attacks and kills the driver, only to realize that the man was innocent. This act sets off a chain of hallucinations and encounters with ghostly apparitions, including his mistress and the taxi driver, who haunt him relentlessly.

As reality blurs, Kyung-rae is forced to confront his guilt and the consequences of his actions. The Fool card's symbolism plays out as his reckless decisions lead him into a descent of madness, questioning the nature of reality and morality.

=== Please Throw It Away ===
Dong-in, a seasoned delivery driver, stumbles upon the High Priestess tarot card during a routine delivery. The card, representing intuition and hidden knowledge, marks the beginning of a series of bizarre and terrifying events.

Dong-in starts experiencing time loops, delivering packages to the same address repeatedly, each time encountering increasingly disturbing scenarios. The recipient, a woman with an unsettling demeanor, hints at knowing personal details about Dong-in's life, blurring the lines between customer and predator.

As the deliveries continue, Dong-in's reality unravels. He witnesses grotesque transformations, with the woman morphing into a monstrous entity. The environment becomes hostile, with inanimate objects moving on their own and the walls bleeding.

In a desperate attempt to escape the cycle, Dong-in tries to discard the High Priestess card, only to find it reappearing in his possession. The narrative culminates in a harrowing confrontation where Dong-in must face the embodiment of his suppressed fears and desires, questioning his own identity and sanity.

== Cast ==
- Cho Yeo-jeong as Ji-woo
- Park Ha-sun
- Dex as Dong-in
- Ko Kyu-pil as Kyung-rae
- Seo Ji-hoon as Jae-yoon
- Lee Joo-bin as Ji-oh
- Lee Moon-sik as a taxi driver
- Hahm Eun-jung as Eun-mi
- Kim Sung-tae as Min-chan

== Production ==
Tarot is one of the two Korean Series that competed in the short film section at the Canneseries 2024 and release as a movie before coming out as a series. On January 16, 2024, production company LG U+ STUDIO announced in South Korean news outlet iMBC that DEX (Kim Jin-young), has been cast in K-drama series, Tarot.

== Release ==
CJ CGV first released the Tarot movie on June 14, 2024 while the Tarot TV series was released in July 15, 2024 on U+ Mobile TV.

== Reception ==
=== Box office ===
The film was sold to several distributors across 25 foreign countries on the eve of the Cannes market. According to Screen International, It was picked up by Taiwan (Long Shong), Mongolia (Filmbridge), Indonesia (PT Prima) and Vietnam (CJ CGV Vietnam). It made $92,700 on its first three days finishing ninth place.

=== Critical response ===
Jayanty Nada Shofa of Jakarta Globe gave the film a mixed reviews and wrote:

Each episode usually ends with a brief explanation on a reversed tarot card, which pretty much explains why the characters end up being the way they are. However, "Tarot" still feels like a disjointed work. Bad luck and random tarot cards are not enough to tie the three stories together.

== See also ==
- Tarot (TV series)
