= Black (South Korean TV series) =

2017 South Korean TV series

- Promotional poster
- Also known as: Beullaek , Beulraek , Блэк
- Hangul: 블랙
- RR: Beullaek
- MR: Pŭllaek
- Genre: Romance; Fantasy; Thriller; Comedy
- Created by: Studio Dragon
- Written by: Choi Ran
- Directed by: Kim Hong-sun
- Starring: Song Seung-heon; Go Ara; Lee El; Kim Dong-jun
- Composer: Nam Hye-seung
- Country of origin: South Korea
- Original language: Korean
- No. of episodes: 18

Production
- Executive producers: Kim Jong-sik; Song Jae-joon
- Producers: Kim Ryun-hee; Kim Jong-sik; Song Jae-jun
- Running time: 80 minutes
- Production company: iWill Media

Original release
- Network: OCN
- Release: October 14 – December 10, 2017

Black (Korean: 블랙) is a 2017 fantasy-thriller South Korean television series starring Song Seung-heon, Go Ara, Lee El, and Kim Dong-jun. It aired on OCN from October 14 to December 10, 2017, every Saturday and Sunday at 22:20 (KST).

== Synopsis ==
Black is the story of a grim reaper who is forced to track down his fugitive partner. In the process, he uncovers the truth about a series of cold case murders from 20 years ago. Investigating the murders complicates the reaper's primary role of guiding the deceased to their respective afterlife, especially after he falls in love with a mortal woman - which leads him to break supernatural rules against involvement in human affairs.

== Cast ==
=== Main ===
- Song Seung-heon as Han Moo-gang / Black (Grim Reaper #444) / Kim Joon
  - Choi Seung-hoon as young Han Moo-gang

Han Moo-Gang newly joins the detective team of the Regional Crime Unit in order to find out the truth of a case that happened 20 years before. After his death, he is possessed by the messenger of hell, No.444. When Han Moo-Gang dies unexpectedly, the bracelet Kang Ha-ram gave to Kim Joon appears on his hand, so Kang Ha-ram mistakes him for her childhood first love, "Joon Oppa".

- Go Ara as Kang Ha-ram
  - Ok Ye-rin as child Kang Ha-ram
  - Choi Myung-bin as young Kang Ha-ram

A woman who can foresee death as a dark shadow looming over someone which turns out to be a grim reaper following them to their moment of death.

- Lee El as Yoon Soo-wan/ Kim Sun Young
  - Song Soo-hyun as young Yoon Soo-wan/ Kim Sun Young

A doctor who is in love with Han Moo-gang. She was adopted by Kim Joon's family decades prior to the main storyline, and was the victim of several filmed sexual assaults by the perpetrators of the serial murders.

- Kim Dong-jun as Oh Man-soo
  - Lee Seung-woo as child Oh Man-soo
  - Lee Geon-ha as young Oh Man-soo

A second generation chaebol.

=== Supporting ===
==== People around Han Moo-gang ====
- Kim Won-hae as Na Gwang-gyun / Crazy Dog
- Jung Suk-yong as Bong Man-shik
- Lee Chul-min as Oh Soo-tae
- Huh Jae-ho as Park Gwi-nam
- Ji Su-won as Seo Young-hwa, Han Moo-gang's mother and Kim Joon's adoptive mother who is a cardiologist.

==== People around Kang Ha-ram ====
- Kim Jung-young as Choi Soon-jung, Ha-ram's mother.
  - Lee Si-won as young Choi Soon-jung
- Kim Hyung-min as Kang Soo-hyuk, Ha-ram's father.
- Go Seung-bo as Hoon-seok, Ha-ram's stepbrother.
- Park Jung-hak as Ha-ram's stepfather

==== Grim Reapers ====
- Kim Tae-Woo as Grim Reaper #444
- Park Doo-shik as Je Soo-dong / Grim Reaper #419
- Jo Jae-yoon as Grim Reaper #007
- Lee Kyu-bok as Grim Reaper #416
  - Jung Joon-won as Jang Hyun-soo / Grim Reaper #416 (real form), a friend of Kim Joon who was killed in the Mujin Time Mart incident.

==== People around Man-soo ====
- Lee Do-kyung as Oh Chun-soo, Man-soo's father.
- Choi Min-chul as Oh Man-ho, Man-soo's half-brother.
- Choi Won-hong as Oh Sang-min, Man-ho's son.
- Kim Jae-young as Leo / Kim Woo-shik, a K-pop star
  - Jeon Jin-seo as young Kim Woo-shik
- Oh Cho-hee as Tiffany / Lee Young-hee
- Kim Young-sun as Man-soo's mother

==== Others ====
- Lee Hae-young as Min Jae-hong
- Woo Hyun as Wang Yong-chun, a man with spider tattoo.
- Kim Bo-yoon as Soo-jin
- Lee Kwan-hoon as Chen (man with missing finger)
- Bae Jung-hwa as Han Jin-sook
- Lee Hyo-je as Kim Joon / Han Moo-chan, Han Moo-gang's older brother who is renamed as Han Moo-chan after being adopted by Moo-gang's mother.
- No Tae-yeop as Steven Yoo
- Lee Joon-seo as Park Seung-chul
- Song Min-hyung as Woo Byung-sik
- Cha Chung-hwa as Clara
- Yeon Jae-wook as Lee Byung-tae

== Production ==
- The script reading of the cast was held on July 24, 2017.
- The series was under negotiation with Netflix for a simultaneous streaming deal. It is not available at this time on Netflix.

== Original soundtrack ==
Black Original soundtrack

Soundtrack album by Various Artists
- Recorded: 2017
- Genre: Soundtrack
- Languages: Korean; English
- Labels: Universal Music Korea; EL Wide

=== Part 1 ===
No.	Title	Artist	Length
1.	"Take Me Out"	Nam Tae-hyun	4:31
2.	"Take Me Out" (Inst.)	Nam Tae-hyun	4:31
Total length:			9:02

=== Part 2 ===
No.	Title	Artist	Length
1.	"Like a Film"	leeSA (리싸)	3:37
2.	"Like a Film" (Inst.)	leeSA (리싸)	3:41
Total length:			7:18

=== Part 3 ===
No.	Title	Artist	Length
1.	"Another Me"	Han Min-chae (민채)	4:35
2.	"Another Me" (Inst.)	Han Min-chae (민채)	4:41
Total length:			9:16

== Ratings ==
Ep.	Original broadcast date	Average audience share		
Ep.	Original broadcast date	Nielsen Korea		TNmS
Ep.	Original broadcast date	Nationwide	Seoul	Nationwide
1	October 14, 2017	2.141%	2.416%	2.0%
2	October 15, 2017	3.876%	4.170%	3.0%
3	October 21, 2017	3.963%	4.715%	2.7%
4	October 22, 2017	4.318%	5.080%	3.7%
5	October 28, 2017	3.595%	4.229%	2.9%
6	October 29, 2017	4.087%	4.714%	3.6%
7	November 4, 2017	3.580%	4.427%	3.0%
8	November 5, 2017	3.247%	3.727%	2.6%
9	November 11, 2017	2.966%	3.636%	2.3%
10	November 12, 2017	3.409%	4.245%	3.6%
11	November 18, 2017	2.535%	2.795%	2.1%
12	November 19, 2017	3.074%	3.613%	2.9%
13	November 25, 2017	2.532%	2.707%	2.4%
14	November 26, 2017	3.038%	3.234%	2.8%
15	December 2, 2017	2.453%	2.395%	2.0%
16	December 3, 2017	3.470%	3.810%	2.6%
17	December 9, 2017	3.085%	3.403%	2.2%
18	December 10, 2017	4.181%	4.518%	3.7%
Average		3.308%	3.769%	2.8%
In the table above, the blue numbers represent the lowest ratings and the red numbers represent the highest ratings.; This series aired on a cable channel/pay TV which normally has a relatively smaller audience compared to free-to-air TV/public broadcasters (KBS, SBS, MBC and EBS).

== Remake ==
The series was adapted into a Malay-language web series [ms] which was released on Viu for two seasons. The Malaysian adaptation replaced the concept of grim reaper with Orang bunian, a supernatural being in Malay folklore.
