= Korean Cultural Centre UK =

Cultural organization in London

The Korean Cultural Centre UK (KCCUK) is a branch of the South Korean Korean Cultural Centers that first opened on 31 January 2008 just off London's Trafalgar Square.

== Exhibitions ==
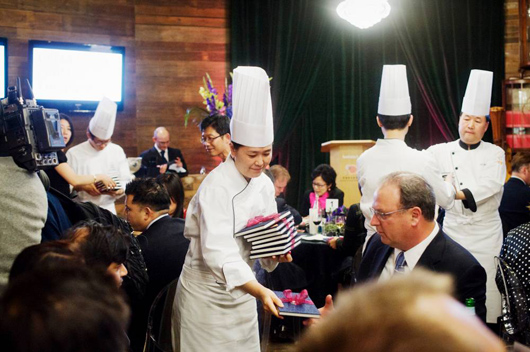
Korean Cultural Center in London

The KCCUK holds regular exhibitions at its centre throughout the year, as well as the annual UK-based Korean Artists Exhibition each December. In 2011, the KCCUK, in partnership with the KCCNY produced their first joint-exhibition with another Cultural Centre, named NyLon and in 2010; the KCCUK's Exhibition ‘Present from the Past’ raised over £20,000 for the British veterans of the Korean War.

== Performances and Events ==
The KCCUK holds events throughout the year. At the KCC there are regular concerts and K-pop Nights as well as talks, lectures, workshops and gallery tours. Offsite, the KCCUK produces the annual ‘London Korean Film Festival’ as well as frequently participating in the Mayor's Thames Festival and the Edinburgh International Festival.

== Korean Language Courses ==
The Sejong Institute at the Korean Cultural Centre UK is the Korean language course that offers a social education programme. Upon completing the course students are able to express themselves in Korean on a vast range of topics.

== Film Club ==
For larger groups, the KCCUK operates a Film Club, where 5 or more guests can watch Korean Films in the Main hall or Video Rooms.
